= 2012–13 Aris Thessaloniki F.C. season =

Aris Thessaloniki
- Chairman: Giannis Psifidis
- Manager: Soulis Papadopoulos
- Stadium: Kleanthis Vikelidis Stadium
- Super League: 13th
- Greek Cup: Round of 32
- Top goalscorer: League: David Aganzo (9); All: David Aganzo (9)
Home colours	Away colours	Third colours

Aris Thessaloniki competes in the Greek topflight. They started their Greek campaign after finishing ninth in last season's league and will enter the Greek Football Cup in the fourth round.

After many financial difficulties during the past season, a new chairman, Antonis Zambetas, was elected by the Aris Members' Society. The new Board of directors announced a 78% budget cut and most of the players including Nery Castillo, Michalis Sifakis, Ricardo Faty, Neto were released. Under manager Makis Katsavakis, Aris will largely depend on players from the club's youth team and free agents.

== First-team squad ==
#	Name	Nationality	Position(s)	Date of birth (age)	Signed from
Goalkeepers
1	Markos Vellidis	(Greece)	GK	4 April 1987 (aged 26)	(Greece) Diagoras Rodou
13	Sokratis Dioudis	(Greece)	GK	3 February 1993 (aged 20)	Club's Academy
32	Marios Gelis	(Greece)	GK	9 October 1994 (aged 18)	(Greece) Panserraikos
Defenders
3	Michalis Giannitsis	(Greece)	CB / RB	6 February 1992 (aged 21)	Club's Academy
4	Grigoris Papazaharias (captain)	(Greece)	LB / RB / DM	20 March 1985 (aged 28)	(Greece) Iraklis
6	Charalampos Oikonomopoulos	(Greece)	CB / DM	9 January 1991 (aged 22)	Club's Academy
19	Rubén Pulido (vice-captain)	(Spain)	CB	2 February 1979 (aged 34)	(Greece) Asteras Tripolis
21	Giorgos Margaritis	(Greece)	LB	20 June 1991 (aged 21)	(Greece) Agrotikos Asteras
31	Giannis Zaradoukas	(Greece)	LB / DM	12 December 1985 (aged 27)	(Greece) Olympiacos
35	Stelios Tsoukanis	(Greece)	LB / LW	27 February 1990 (aged 23)	(Greece) Anagennisi Epanomi
36	Nikos Psychogios	(Greece)	RB	25 February 1989 (aged 24)	(Greece) Doxa Drama
44	Andreas Iraklis	(Greece)	CB / RB / DM	16 May 1989 (aged 24)	(Greece) Kallithea
Midfielders
7	Konstantinos Kaznaferis	(Greece)	DM / RB / LB	22 June 1987 (aged 25)	(Greece) PAS Giannina
8	Vassilis Triantafyllakos	(Greece)	CM / DM / AM	16 July 1991 (aged 21)	(Greece) Odysseas Anagennisis
10	Andreas Tatos	(Greece)	CM / AM	11 May 1989 (aged 24)	(Greece) Olympiacos
12	Kostas Kotsaridis	(Greece)	CM / DM	12 June 1992 (aged 20)	(Greece) AEK Athens
17	Manolis Papasterianos	(Greece)	CM / DM	15 August 1987 (aged 25)	(Greece) Iraklis
24	Dimitris Sounas	(Greece)	CM / AM	12 August 1994 (aged 18)	Club's Academy
27	Pantelis Antoniadis	(Greece)	DM / CM	23 March 1994 (aged 19)	Club's Academy
30	Erotokritos Damarlis	(Greece)	DM / CB	13 May 1992 (aged 21)	Club's Academy
66	Nuno Coelho	(Portugal)	DM / CM / CB	23 November 1987 (aged 25)	(Portugal) Benfica
Forwards
9	David Aganzo	(Spain)	ST	10 January 1981 (aged 32)	(Spain) Hércules
11	Nikos Angeloudis	(Greece)	ST	14 May 1991 (aged 22)	(Greece) Iraklis
20	Giannis Gianniotas	(Greece)	RW / LW / SS	29 April 1993 (aged 20)	Club's Academy
26	Alexandros Karagiannis	(Greece)	LW / RW	25 October 1993 (aged 19)	Club's Academy
28	Andi Renja	(Albania) / (Greece)	RW	6 January 1993 (aged 20)	Club's Academy
33	Dimitrios Diamantakos	(Greece)	ST / LW / RW	5 March 1993 (aged 20)	(Greece) Olympiacos

== Transfers and loans ==
=== Transfers in ===
Entry date	Position	No.	Player	From club	Fee	Ref.
July 2012	FW	14	(Greece) Giannis Gesios	(Greece) Anagennisi Epanomi	Free	
July 2012	DF	5	(Greece) Nikos Pantidos	(Greece) Ethnikos Asteras	Free	
July 2012	DF	44	(Greece) Andreas Iraklis	(Greece) Kallithea	Free	
July 2012	DF	21	(Greece) Giorgos Margaritis	(Greece) Agrotikos Asteras	Free	
July 2012	MF	2	(Greece) Dimitris Aslanidis	(Greece) Anagennisi Epanomi	Free	
July 2012	DF	19	(Spain) Rubén Pulido	(Greece) Asteras Tripolis	Free	
August 2012	DF	36	(Greece) Nikos Psychogios	(Greece) Doxa Drama	Free	
August 2012	GK	91	(Georgia (country)) / (Greece) Petr Gusev	(Greece) Ethnikos Asteras	Free	
September 2012	FW	9	(Spain) David Aganzo	(Spain) Hércules	Free	
January 2013	MF	12	(Greece) Kostas Kotsaridis	(Greece) AEK Athens	Free	
January 2013	GK	32	(Greece) Marios Gelis	(Greece) Panserraikos	Free	

=== Transfers out ===
Exit date	Position	No.	Player	To club	Fee	Ref.
June 2012	DF	24	(Greece) Nikos Lazaridis	(Greece) Atromitos	Released	
June 2012	MF	14	(Senegal) / (France) Ricardo Faty	(France) Ajaccio	Released	
July 2012	GK	13	(Greece) Michalis Sifakis	Free Agent	Released	
July 2012	FW	10	(Mexico) / (Uruguay) Nery Castillo	Free Agent	Released	
August 2012	MF	8	(Colombia) Juan Toja	Free Agent	Released	
July 2012	DF	6	(Brazil) / (Italy) Michel Pereira	Free Agent	Released	
July 2012	DF	16	(Ghana) / (Denmark) Francis Dickoh	Free Agent	Released	
July 2012	MF	88	(Bolivia) Nacho García	Free Agent	Released	
July 2012	MF	33	(Argentina) Javier Umbides	(Turkey) Orduspor	Released	
July 2012	GK	84	(Switzerland) / (Bosnia and Herzegovina) Eldin Jakupović	(England) Hull City	Released	
July 2012	FW	77	(Spain) Noé Acosta	(Greece) Levadiakos	Released	
July 2012	DF	2	(Brazil) Darcy Dolce Neto	(Brazil) Bahia	Released	
July 2012	DF	19	(Senegal) Khalifa Sankaré	(Greece) Asteras Tripolis	Released	
July 2012	FW	7	(Algeria) / (France) Karim Soltani	(Algeria) ES Sétif	Released	
August 2012	MF	55	(Greece) Sakis Prittas	(Greece) Panthrakikos	Released	
August 2012	MF	12	(Greece) Giorgos Katidis	(Greece) AEK Athens	100.000 €	
January 2013	FW	14	(Greece) Giannis Gesios	Free Agent	Released	
January 2013	FW	22	(Greece) Thanasis Kanoulas	(Greece) OFI	Released	
January 2013	MF	2	(Greece) Dimitris Aslanidis	(Greece) Panionios	Released	
January 2013	DF	5	(Greece) Nikos Pantidos	Free Agent	Released	
January 2013	DF	15	(Greece) Dimitris Kotsonis	(Greece) Ergotelis	Released	
January 2013	MF	10	(Greece) Kostas Kapetanos	Free Agent	Released	
January 2013	GK	91	(Georgia (country)) Petr Gusev	Free Agent	Released	

=== Loans in ===
Start date	End date	Position	No.	Player	From club	Fee	Ref.
August 2012	End of season	MF	66	(Portugal) Nuno Coelho	(Portugal) Benfica	None	
January 2013	End of season	FW	33	(Greece) Dimitrios Diamantakos	(Greece) Olympiacos	None	
January 2013	End of season	DF	31	(Greece) Giannis Zaradoukas	(Greece) Olympiacos	None	
January 2013	End of season	MF	10	(Greece) Andreas Tatos	(Greece) Olympiacos	None	

== Friendly matches ==
27 July 2012	Siena	1 – 0	Aris Thessaloniki	San Vito di Cadore
18:30	Michele Paolucci 35'	https://www.gazzetta.gr/aris/article/312307-kalos-kai-me-baria-podia (in Greek)

29 July 2012	Como	0 – 0 (45 min) (3 - 4 p)	Aris Thessaloniki	San Vito di Cadore
18:00

29 July 2012	Palermo	1 – 0 (45 min)	Aris Thessaloniki	San Vito di Cadore
20:00	Miccoli 8' (pen.)

2 August 2012	Kayserispor	0 – 0	Aris Thessaloniki	Prato Allo Stelvio
18:30

5 August 2012	Fiorentina	2 – 1	Aris Thessaloniki	Prato Allo Stelvio
18:30	Rômulo 31'; Adem Ljajić 57'	https://www.contra.gr/podosfairo/fiorentina-aris.6911137.html (in Greek)	Vassilis Triantafyllakos 14'

10 August 2012	Aris Thessaloniki	0 – 0	PAS Giannina	Thessaloniki
20:00				Stadium: Kleanthis Vikelidis Stadium

13 August 2012	Aris Thessaloniki	1 – 1	Veria	Thessaloniki
18:30	Dimitris Sounas 54'	https://www.gazzetta.gr/aris/article/317289-epeigontos-metagrafes (in Greek)	Damian Bellón 31'	Stadium: Kleanthis Vikelidis Stadium

19 August 2012	Roma	3 – 0	Aris Thessaloniki	Rome
18:30	Dani Osvaldo 25'; Michael Bradley 71'; Mattia Destro 86'	https://www.gazzetta.gr/aris/article/318545-ax-ayta-ta-lathivids (in Greek)		Stadium: Stadio Olimpico

9 September 2012	Aris Thessaloniki	0 – 1	Benfica B	Thessaloniki
21:00		http://www.contra.gr/Soccer/Hellas/Superleague/aris/arhs-mpenfika.1922047.html (in Greek)	Miguel Rosa 51'	Stadium: Kleanthis Vikelidis Stadium

12 September 2012	Kilkisiakos	1 – 1	Aris Thessaloniki	Kilkis
20:30	Konstantinos Dountoukis 45'	https://www.sport24.gr/football/kilkisiakos-aris-1-1.8035017.html (in Greek)	Stelios Tsoukanis 25'	Stadium: Municipal Stadium of Kilkis

== Competitions ==
=== Overall ===
Competition	Started round	Current position / round	Final position / round	First match	Last match
Super League	Matchday 1	—	13th	27 August 2012	21 April 2013
Greek Cup	Round of 32	—	Round of 32	12 December 2012	23 December 2012

Updated to match played 21 April 2013
Source: Competitions

=== Overview ===
Competition	Record							
Competition	G	W	D	L	GF	GA	GD	Win %
Super League	30	7	12	11	32	40	−8	23.33
Greek Cup	2	1	0	1	3	4	−1	50.00
Total	32	8	12	12	35	44	−9	25.00

Updated to match played 21 April 2013
Source: Competitions

=== Super League ===
==== League table ====
Pos	Team	Pld	W	D	L	GF	GA	GD	Pts	Qualification or relegation
11	Levadiakos	30	9	7	14	21	35	−14	34	
12	Veria	30	8	9	13	30	35	−5	33 (Note: Head-to-head points (goal difference): Veria 3 (+1), Aris 3 (-1).)	
13	Aris	30	7	12	11	32	40	−8	33	
14	OFI	30	8	8	14	33	46	−13	32	
15	AEK Athens (Note: AEK Athens were deducted 3 points because of severe crowd violence during their home match against Panthrakikos this year. They were also voluntarily relegated to the third division in order to enter the liquidation process and remove a big number of debts to the club.) (R)	30	8	6	16	21	36	−15	27	Relegation to Gamma Ethniki

Source: Super League Greece
Rules for classification: 1) Points; 2) Head-to-head points; 3) Head-to-head goal difference.
If in current league table there are tied teams after applying criteria 1 to 3, they are considered to share places and listed in Greek language alphabetic order.
If in final league table there are still tied teams after applying criteria 1 to 3, a decision match (or matches if they are more than two) are to be played but only in three cases: to determine the champion, to fill spots in the play-off or to determine the teams to be relegated. In any other case, the final standings of tied teams are determined with a public draw
(R) Relegated

==== Results summary ====
Overall								Home						Away					
Pld	W	D	L	GF	GA	GD	Pts	W	D	L	GF	GA	GD	W	D	L	GF	GA	GD
30	7	12	11	32	40	−8	33	6	7	2	22	13	+9	1	5	9	10	27	−17

Last updated: 21 August 2012.
Source: Competitive matches

==== Results by round ====
Round	1	2	3	4	5	6	7	8	9	10	11	12	13	14	15	16	17	18	19	20	21	22	23	24	25	26	27	28	29	30
Ground	A	H	A	H	A	H	A	H	H	A	H	A	H	A	H	H	A	H	A	H	A	H	A	A	H	A	H	A	H	A
Result	L	D	D	W	L	L	D	D	W	L	L	L	D	D	D	W	L	D	D	D	L	W	L	L	W	L	D	W	W	D
Position	12	11	11	7	9	11	12	12	8	11	14	13	13	13	14	13	13	13	13	13	15	14	15	15	14	15	15	14	14	13

Source: Aris at Super League Greece official site Aris at soccerway.com
A = Away; H = Home; W = Win; D = Draw; L = Loss

==== Matches ====
27 August 2012 1	Panionios	1 – 0	Aris Thessaloniki	Athens
20:30	Vasilis Lampropoulos 14'	Report		Stadium: Nea Smyrni Stadium; Attendance: 2,091; Referee: Ilias Spathas

2 September 2012 2	Aris Thessaloniki	0 – 0	OFI	Thessaloniki
18:15		Report		Stadium: Kleanthis Vikelidis Stadium; Attendance: 8,370; Referee: Charalambos Kalogeropoulos

16 September 2012 3	AEK Athens	1 – 1	Aris Thessaloniki	Athens
20:30	Yago Fernández 58'	Report	David Aganzo 74'	Stadium: Athens Olympic Stadium; Attendance: 12,145; Referee: Dimitrios Kominis

23 September 2012 4	Aris Thessaloniki	1 – 0	Kerkyra	Thessaloniki
18:15	David Aganzo 57'	Report		Stadium: Kleanthis Vikelidis Stadium; Attendance: 7,010; Referee: Giorgos Kyzas

30 September 2012 Matchday 5	PAOK	4 – 1	Aris Thessaloniki	Toumba Stadium
20:30	Lawrence 12'; Katsikas 23'; Fotakis 30'; Athanasiadis 43'		Aganzo 39'	Attendance: 24,000; Referee: Anastassios Kakkos

7 October 2012 Matchday 6	Aris Thessaloniki	0 – 2	Platanias	Thessaloniki
18:15			Kalajdžić 38'; Udoji 66'	Stadium: Kleanthis Vikelidis Stadium; Attendance: 10,000; Referee: Giannis Delfakis

21 October 2012 Matchday 7	Panathinaikos	1 – 1	Aris Thessaloniki	Olympic Stadium (Athens)
20:30	Christodoulopoulos 76' (pen.)		Gianniotas 88'	Attendance: 5,000; Referee: Charalambos Kalogeropoulos

29 October 2012 Matchday 8	Aris	2 – 2	Olympiacos	Thessaloniki
19:30	Papasterianos 3'; Aganzo 79'		Abdoun 9' (pen.); Holebas 82'	Stadium: Kleanthis Vikelidis Stadium; Attendance: 17,000; Referee: Alexandros Aretopoulos

5 November 2012 Matchday 9	Aris	2 – 1	Veria	Kleanthis Vikelidis Stadium
19:30	Aganzo 56'; Gesios 70'		Kaltsas 2'	Attendance: 10,000; Referee: Michail Koukoulakis

10 November 2012 Matchday 10	Levadeiakos	2 – 1	Aris	Levadia Municipal Stadium
19:30	Zisopoulos 22'; Vasileiou 44'		Kanoulas 40'	Attendance: 2,500; Referee: Stavros Mantalos

17 November 2012 Matchday 11	Aris	1 – 2	PAS Giannina	Kleanthis Vikelidis Stadium
17:15	Gianniotas 54'		Ilić 12'; Psychogios 27' (o.g.)	Attendance: 8,500; Referee: Ioannis Delfakis

26 November 2012 Matchday 12	Panthrakikos	4 – 0	Aris	Komotini Municipal Stadium
19:30	Papadopoulos 1', 54'; Baykara 44'; Lucero 75'			Attendance: 3,500; Referee: Ilias Spathas

1 December 2012 Matchday 13	Aris	1 – 1	Atromitos	Kleanthis Vikelidis Stadium
17:15	Sounas 15'		Skondras 89'	Attendance: 8,000; Referee: Georgios Daskalopoulos

9 December 2012 Matchday 14	Asteras Tripolis	1 – 1	Aris	Asteras Tripolis Stadium
17:15	Giannitsis 78' (o.g.)		Gianniotas 23'	Attendance: 4,000; Referee: Dimitrios Thanos

16 November 2012 Matchday 15	Aris	0 – 0	Skoda Xanthi	Kleanthis Vikelidis Stadium
15:00				Attendance: 6,000; Referee: Dimitrios Styliaras

6 January 2013 Matchday 16	Aris	2 – 1	Panionios	Kleanthis Vikelidis Stadium
15:00	Aggeloudis 29'; Aganzo 79'		Dounis 42'	Attendance: 6,700; Referee: Athanasios Giachos

13 January 2013 Matchday 17	OFI	2 – 0	Aris	Theodoros Vardinogiannis Stadium
17:15	Perogamvrakis 29'; Papazoglou 79'			Attendance: 4,000; Referee: Ilias Spathas

20 January 2013 Matchday 18	Aris	1 – 1	AEK Athens	Kleanthis Vikelidis Stadium
19:30	Aganzo 84'		Petropoulos 90+'	Attendance: 13,000; Referee: Anastassios Kakos

28 January 2013 Matchday 19	Kerkyra	2 – 2	Aris	Kerkyra Stadium
19:30	Kyvelidis 24', 53'		Giannitsis 17'; Karagiannis 79'	Attendance: 3,000; Referee: Anastasios Sidiropoulos

3 February 2013 Matchday 20	Aris	2 – 2	PAOK	Kleanthis Vikelidis Stadium
19:30	Aganzo 5', 71'		Athanasiadis 2'; Camara 26'	Attendance: 19,000; Referee: Michail Voskakis

11 February 2013 Matchday 21	Platanias	2 – 0	Aris	Perivolia Municipal Stadium
19:30	Nazlidis 45'; Anastasakos 63'			Attendance: 4,000; Referee: Stavros Mantalos

17 February 2013 Matchday 22	Aris	1 – 0	Panathinaikos	Kleanthis Vikelidis Stadium
19:30	Coelho 89'			Attendance: 15,500; Referee: Dimitrios Styliaras

24 February 2013 Matchday 23	Olympiacos	2 – 1	Aris	Karaiskakis Stadium
19:30	Djebbour 9'; Maniatis 37'		Aggeloudis 65'	Attendance: 20,000; Referee: Anastasios Sidiropoulos

4 March 2013 Matchday 24	Veria	3 – 1	Aris	Veria Stadium
19:30	Kaltsas 65', 90'; Olaitan 90'		Aggeloudis 49'	Attendance: 8,500; Referee: Andreas Pappas

10 March 2013 Matchday 25	Aris	4 – 0	Levadeiakos	Kleanthis Vikelidis Stadium
17:15	Coelho 2'; Gianniotas 48', 64'; Tatos 80'			Attendance: 12,000; Referee: Dimitrios Kominis

16 March 2013 Matchday 26	PAS Giannina	2 – 0	Aris	Zosimades Stadium
17:15	Ilić 24'; Korovesis 64'			Attendance: 4,500; Referee: Ilias Spathas

30 March 2013 Matchday 27	Aris	0 – 0	Panthrakikos	Kleanthis Vikelidis Stadium
17:15				Attendance: 16,000; Referee: Stavros Mantalos

6 April 2013 Matchday 28	Atromitos	0 – 1	Aris	Peristeri Stadium
19:30			Tatos 82'	Attendance: 6,000; Referee: Dimitrios Styliaras

14 April 2013 Matchday 29	Aris	5 – 1	Asteras Tripolis	Kleanthis Vikelidis Stadium
19:00	Triantafyllakos 7'; Tatos 29', 79' (pen.), 88'; Aggeloudis 46'		Caffa 58'	Attendance: 23,000; Referee: Anastasios Sidiropoulos

21 April 2013 Matchday 30	Skoda Xanthi	0 – 0	Aris	Skoda Xanthi Arena
19:00				Attendance: 4,000; Referee: Dimitrios Kominis

=== Greek Football Cup ===
==== Round of 32 ====
12 December 2012 First leg	Kallithea	3 – 1	Aris Thessaloniki	Athens
18:30	Alexandre D'Acol 18', 57'; Fillip Da Silva 76'	Report	Giannis Gianniotas 79'	Stadium: Grigoris Lambrakis Stadium; Referee: Spyros Selimos

23 December 2012 Second leg	Aris Thessaloniki	2 – 1 (3–4 agg.)	Kallithea	Thessaloniki
20:00	Dimitris Sounas 29'; Rubén Pulido 82'	Report	Alexandre D'Acol 56'	Stadium: Kleanthis Vikelidis Stadium; Referee: Gerasimos Ditsos

== Player statistics ==
=== Appearances ===
As of match played 21 April 2013

#	Position	Nat.	Player	Super League		Greek Cup		Total	
#	Position	Nat.	Player	Apps	Starts	Apps	Starts	Apps	Starts
1	GK	(Greece)	Markos Vellidis	18	18	1	1	19	19
3	DF	(Greece)	Michalis Giannitsis	13	12	1	1	14	13
4	DF	(Greece)	Grigoris Papazaharias	24	22	1	1	25	23
6	DF	(Greece)	Charalampos Oikonomopoulos	17	11	2	2	19	13
7	MF	(Greece)	Konstantinos Kaznaferis	25	25	2	1	27	26
8	MF	(Greece)	Vassilis Triantafyllakos	19	9	2	1	21	10
9	FW	(Spain)	David Aganzo	21	19	0	0	21	19
10	MF	(Greece)	Andreas Tatos	11	11	0	0	11	11
11	FW	(Greece)	Nikos Angeloudis	12	4	2	1	14	5
12	MF	(Greece)	Kostas Kotsaridis	4	2	0	0	4	2
13	GK	(Greece)	Sokratis Dioudis	12	12	1	1	13	13
17	MG	(Greece)	Manolis Papasterianos	24	22	0	0	24	22
19	DF	(Spain)	Rubén Pulido	20	20	1	1	21	21
20	FW	(Greece)	Giannis Gianniotas	26	26	2	1	28	27
21	DF	(Greece)	Giorgos Margaritis	20	14	1	1	21	15
24	MF	(Greece)	Dimitris Sounas	18	11	2	2	20	13
26	FW	(Greece)	Alexandros Karagiannis	6	4	2	2	8	6
27	MF	(Greece)	Pantelis Antoniadis	1	0	0	0	1	0
28	FW	(Albania) / (Greece)	Andi Renja	1	0	0	0	1	0
30	MF	(Greece)	Erotokritos Damarlis	11	6	0	0	11	6
31	DF	(Greece)	Giannis Zaradoukas	12	11	0	0	12	11
32	GK	(Greece)	Marios Gelis	0	0	0	0	0	0
33	FW	(Greece)	Dimitrios Diamantakos	13	9	0	0	13	9
35	DF	(Greece)	Stelios Tsoukanis	5	1	1	1	6	2
36	DF	(Greece)	Nikos Psychogios	13	12	1	1	14	13
44	DF	(Greece)	Andreas Iraklis	5	2	0	0	5	2
66	MF	(Portugal)	Nuno Coelho	25	25	2	2	27	27
Players who left the club during this season
	FW	(Greece)	Giannis Gesios	8	3	0	0	8	3
	MF	(Greece)	Kostas Kapetanos	11	8	0	0	11	8
	FW	(Greece)	Thanasis Kanoulas	6	1	1	1	7	2
	DF	(Greece)	Dimitris Aslanidis	7	3	0	0	7	3
	DF	(Greece)	Nikos Pantidos	11	7	0	0	11	7
	DF	(Greece)	Dimitris Kotsonis	0	0	1	1	1	1
Total				30		2		32	

=== Goals ===
As of match played 21 April 2013

Ranking	Position	Nat.	Player	Super League	Greek Cup	Total
1	FW	(Spain)	David Aganzo	9	0	9
2	FW	(Greece)	Giannis Gianniotas	5	1	6
3	MF	(Greece)	Andreas Tatos	5	0	5
4	MF	(Greece)	Nikos Aggeloudis	4	0	4
5	DF	(Portugal)	Nuno Coelho	2	0	2
5	MF	(Greece)	Dimitris Sounas	1	1	2
7	MF	(Greece)	Manolis Papasterianos	1	0	1
7	FW	(Greece)	Giannis Gesios	1	0	1
7	FW	(Greece)	Thanasis Kanoulas	1	0	1
7	DF	(Greece)	Michalis Giannitsis	1	0	1
7	MF	(Greece)	Alexandros Karagiannis	1	0	1
7	MF	(Greece)	Vasilis Triantafyllakos	1	0	1
7	DF	(Spain)	Rubén Pulido	0	1	1
Own Goals				0	0	0
Total				32	3	35

== Kit ==
Supplier: Under Armour
Sponsor(s): Kino

Home; Colours	Away; Colours	Third; Colours	Goalkeeper's Home Colours	Goalkeeper's Away Colours
