= 2011–12 Aris Thessaloniki F.C. season =

Aris Thessaloniki
- President: Thanasis Athanasiadis
- Manager: Sakis Tsiolis (until 31 October 2011); Michał Probierz (from 4 November 2011 until 5 January 2012); Giannis Michalitsos (from 6 January 2012 until 15 January 2012); Manuel Machado (from 16 January 2012)
- Stadium: Kleanthis Vikelidis Stadium
- Super League: 6th
- Greek Cup: Fifth Round
- Top goalscorer: League: Nery Castillo (6); All: Nery Castillo (7)
- Highest home attendance: 12.320 (vs PAOK)
- Lowest home attendance: 6.584 (vs Levadiakos)
| Home colours | Away colours | Third colours |

Aris Thessaloniki finished in the 9th place of Super League and did not qualifie the Play-offs. In Greek Cup Aris Thessaloniki eliminated in fifth round by Atromitos.

The club changed its manager three times. The season started with Sakis Tsiolis but he left the club on October. Michał Probierz was the next manager until January 2012 when Giannis Michalitsos hired as caretaker. Aris Thessaloniki finished the season with Manuel Machado as manager.

== First-team squad ==
| # | Name | Nationality | Position(s) | Date of birth (age) | Signed from |
Goalkeepers
| 1 | Markos Vellidis | (Greece) | GK | 4 April 1987 (aged 25) | (Greece) Diagoras Rodou |
| 13 | Michalis Sifakis (captain) | (Greece) | GK | 9 September 1984 (aged 27) | (Greece) OFI Crete |
| 25 | Sokratis Dioudis | (Greece) | GK | 3 February 1993 (aged 19) | Club's Academy |
| 84 | Eldin Jakupović | (Switzerland) / (Bosnia and Herzegovina) | GK | 2 October 1984 (aged 27) | (Greece) Olympiacos Volos |
Defenders
| 2 | Darcy Dolce Neto | (Brazil) | RB / RW | 7 February 1981 (aged 31) | (Brazil) Santos |
| 4 | Grigoris Papazaharias | (Greece) | LB / RB / DM | 20 March 1985 (aged 27) | (Greece) Iraklis |
| 6 | Michel Pereira | (Brazil) / (Italy) | LB / DM | 9 June 1981 (aged 30) | (Brazil) Vila Nova |
| 15 | Michalis Giannitsis | (Greece) | CB / RB | 6 February 1992 (aged 20) | Club's Academy |
| 16 | Francis Dickoh | (Ghana) / (Denmark) | CB | 13 December 1982 (aged 29) | (Scotland) Hibernian |
| 19 | Khalifa Sankaré | (Senegal) | CB | 15 August 1984 (aged 27) | (Greece) Olympiacos Volos |
| 24 | Nikos Lazaridis (vice-captain) | (Greece) | CB | 12 July 1979 (aged 32) | (Greece) Asteras Tripolis |
| 30 | Dimitris Kotsonis | (Greece) | CB / RB / DM | 25 January 1989 (aged 23) | (Greece) Paniliakos |
| 35 | Stelios Tsoukanis | (Greece) | LB / LW | 27 February 1990 (aged 22) | (Greece) Anagennisi Epanomi |
Midfielders
| 5 | Manolis Papasterianos | (Greece) | CM / DM | 15 August 1987 (aged 24) | (Greece) Iraklis |
| 8 | Juan Carlos Toja | (Colombia) | AM / CM | 24 May 1985 (aged 27) | (Romania) Steaua București |
| 12 | Giorgos Katidis | (Greece) | AM / CM | 12 February 1993 (aged 19) | Club's Academy |
| 14 | Ricardo Faty | (Senegal) / (France) | DM / CM | 4 August 1986 (aged 25) | (Italy) Roma |
| 17 | Konstantinos Kaznaferis | (Greece) | DM / RB / LB | 22 June 1987 (aged 24) | (Greece) PAS Giannina |
| 21 | Kostas Kapetanos | (Greece) | LM / CM / AM | 27 October 1984 (aged 27) | (Greece) Olympiacos Volos |
| 28 | Vassilis Triantafyllakos | (Greece) | CM / DM / AM | 16 July 1991 (aged 20) | (Greece) Odysseas Anagennisi |
| 33 | Javier Umbides | (Argentina) | CM / DM / AM | 9 February 1982 (aged 30) | (Greece) Olympiacos Volos |
| 55 | Sakis Prittas | (Greece) | CM / DM | 9 January 1979 (aged 33) | (Greece) Iraklis |
| 88 | Nacho García | (Bolivia) | CM / DM | 17 December 1980 (aged 31) | (Bolivia) Oriente Petrolero |
Forwards
| 7 | Karim Soltani | (Algeria) / (France) | RW / LW / ST | 29 August 1984 (aged 27) | (Greece) Iraklis |
| 10 | Nery Castillo | (Mexico) / (Uruguay) | RW / LW / ST | 13 June 1984 (aged 27) | (Ukraine) Shakhtar Donetsk |
| 20 | Giannis Gianniotas | (Greece) | RW / LW / SS | 29 April 1993 (aged 19) | Club's Academy |
| 22 | Thanasis Kanoulas | (Greece) | ST | 19 February 1992 (aged 20) | (Greece) Anagennisi Epanomi |
| 77 | Noé Acosta | (Spain) | LW / AM | 10 December 1983 (aged 28) | (Greece) Olympiacos Volos |

== Transfers and loans ==
=== Transfers in ===
| Entry date | Position | No. | Player | From club | Fee | Ref. |
|---|---|---|---|---|---|---|
| June 2011 | FW | 22 | (Greece) Thanasis Kanoulas | (Greece) Anagennisi Epanomi | Free | |
| June 2011 | FW | 7 | (Algeria) / (France) Karim Soltani | (Greece) Iraklis | Free | |
| June 2011 | FW | 10 | (Mexico) / (Uruguay) Nery Castillo | (Ukraine) Shakhtar Donetsk | Free | |
| July 2011 | DF | 30 | (Greece) Dimitris Kotsonis | (Greece) Paniliakos | Free | |
| July 2011 | MF | 21 | (Greece) Kostas Kapetanos | (Greece) Olympiacos Volos | Free | |
| July 2011 | MF | 28 | (Greece) Vasilis Triantafyllakos | (Greece) Odysseas Anagennisi | Free | |
| July 2011 | MF | 5 | (Greece) Manolis Papasterianos | (Greece) Iraklis | Free | |
| July 2011 | DF | 35 | (Greece) Stelios Tsoukanis | (Greece) Anagennisi Epanomi | Free | |
| August 2011 | DF | 16 | (Ghana) / (Denmark) Francis Dickoh | (Scotland) Hibernian | Free | |
| August 2011 | FW | 29 | (Romania) Victoraș Iacob | (Greece) Iraklis | Free | |
| September 2011 | MF | 11 | (Croatia) Jurica Vranješ | (Germany) Werder Bremen | Free | |
| September 2011 | DF | 19 | (Senegal) Khalifa Sankaré | (Greece) Olympiacos Volos | Free | |
| September 2011 | MF | 33 | (Argentina) Javier Umbides | (Greece) Olympiacos Volos | Free | |
| September 2011 | GK | 84 | (Switzerland) / (Bosnia and Herzegovina) Eldin Jakupović | (Greece) Olympiacos Volos | Free | |
| September 2011 | FW | 77 | (Spain) Noé Acosta | (Greece) Olympiacos Volos | Free | |

=== Transfers out ===
| Exit date | Position | No. | Player | To club | Fee | Ref. |
|---|---|---|---|---|---|---|
| June 2010 | DF | 5 | (Brazil) / (Portugal) Ronaldo Guiaro | Retired | | |
| June 2011 | DF | 47 | (Greece) Mavroudis Bougaidis | (Greece) AEK Athens | Released | |
| July 2011 | GK | 25 | (Spain) Juanma Barrero | (Spain) Cartagena | Released | |
| July 2011 | DF | 3 | (Spain) Oriol Lozano | Free agent | Released | |
| July 2011 | DF | 33 | (Lithuania) Deividas Česnauskis | Free agent | Released | |
| July 2011 | FW | 7 | (Spain) Toni Calvo | (Bulgaria) Levski Sofia | Released | |
| July 2011 | MF | 19 | (Greece) Kostas Mendrinos | Free agent | Released | |
| July 2011 | DF | 22 | (Greece) Thomas Grekos | (Greece) A.P.S. Zakynthos | Released | |
| August 2011 | FW | 88 | (Japan) Daisuke Sakata | Free agent | Released | |
| August 2011 | DF | 32 | (Albania) Kristi Vangjeli | (Ukraine) Chornomorets Odesa | €300.000 | |
| August 2011 | FW | 23 | (Greece) Christos Aravidis | Free agent | Released | |
| December 2011 | FW | 29 | (Romania) Victoraș Iacob | Free agent | Released | |
| January 2012 | MF | 11 | (Croatia) Jurica Vranješ | Free agent | Released | |
| January 2012 | MF | 18 | (Spain) Cristian Portilla | Free agent | Released | |
| January 2012 | FW | 9 | (Croatia) Danijel Cesarec | Free agent | Released | |
| January 2012 | DF | 3 | (Greece) Giannis Agtzidis | Free agent | Released | |
| January 2012 | DF | 44 | (Greece) Efthymis Kouloucheris | Free agent | Released | |
| March 2012 | FW | 34 | (Greece) Thanasis Topouzis | Free agent | Released | |

=== Loans Out ===
| Start date | End date | Position | No. | Player | To club | Fee | Ref. |
|---|---|---|---|---|---|---|---|
| November 2011 | End of season | FW | 99 | (Greece) Nikos Angeloudis | (Greece) Doxa Drama | None | |
| January 2012 | End of season | DF | 27 | (Greece) Charalampos Oikonomopoulos | (Greece) Vyzas Megara | None | |

== Friendlies ==
| 15 July 2011 | Aris | 1 – 0 | Atromitos | Karpenisi |
| 18:50 | Karim Soltani 11' |

| 19 July 2011 | Aris | 1 – 1 | Kerkyra | Karpenisi |
| 19:00 EEST | Castillo 21' | | Giantsis 25' |

| 21 July 2011 | Aris | 3 – 1 | Panetolikos | Karpenisi |
| 18:50 EEST | Castillo 7'; Aggeloudis 84'; Toja 86' (pen.) | | Rocha 26' (pen.) |

| 26 July 2011 | Aris | 1 – 2 | Peñarol | Kleanthis Vikelidis, Thessaloniki |
| 21:30 EEST | Soltani 40' | | Pérez 21'; Corujo 71' (pen.) | Referee: Christos Mitsios |

| 31 July 2011 | Aris | 4 – 1 | PAS Giannina | Seefeld |
| 19:00 EEST | Sakata 41'; Soltani 48'; Topouzis 68'; Neto 71' (pen.) | | Cuevas 64' (pen.) |

| 2 August 2011 | Aris | 0 – 1 | EN Paralimni | Wörgl |
| 19:00 EEST | | | Roushias 89' |

| 4 August 2011 | Aris | 2 – 3 | Al-Hilal | Garmisch-Partenkirchen |
| 18:00 EEST | Cesarec 45'; Soltani 84' | | Yoo 31'; Qahtani 70'; Shafi 80' |

| 7 August 2011 | Lazio | 2 – 0 | Aris | Rieti |
| 22:00 EEST | Rocchi 21'; Cissé 33' |

| 9 August 2011 | Cagliari | 1 – 1 | Aris | Stadio Bruno Nespoli, Olbia |
| 21:30 EEST | Ariaudo 19' | | Soltani 49' |

| 17 August 2011 | Pierikos | 0 – 0 | Aris | Municipal Stadium of Katerini, Katerini |
| 20:00 EEST |

| 20 August 2011 | Kerkyra | 1 – 1 | Aris | Kerkyra Stadium, Corfu |
| 20:30 EEST | Kalantzis 33' | | Neto 51' |

| 3 September 2011 | Aris | 1 – 1 | Doxa Drama | Kleanthis Vikelidis, Thessaloniki |
| 18:20 EEST | Kapetanos 88' | | Vertzos 24' |

| 4 September 2011 | Anagennisi Epanomi | 2 – 1 | Aris | Kalamaria Stadium, Thessaloniki |
| 17:30 EEST | Georgiadis 69'; Deinopapas 83' | | Cesarec 64' |

| 21 September 2011 | Apollon Kalamarias | 0 – 2 | Aris | Kalamaria Stadium, Thessaloniki |
| 17:00 EEST | | | Gianniotas 43'; Kapetanos 56' |

| 25 February 2012 | Aris | 1 – 1 | Lovech | Kleanthis Vikelidis, Thessaloniki |
| 15:00 EEST | Lazaridis 39' | | Ivanov 23' |

== Competitions ==
=== Overall ===
| Competition | Started round | Current position / round | Final position / round | First match | Last match |
|---|---|---|---|---|---|
| Super League | Matchday 1 | — | 9th | 27 August 2011 | 22 April 2012 |
| Greek Cup | Fourth Round | — | Fifth Round | 22 December 2011 | 12 January 2012 |

Updated to match played 22 April 2012
Source: Competitions

=== Overview ===
| Competition | Record | | | | | | | |
| Competition | G | W | D | L | GF | GA | GD | Win % |
|---|---|---|---|---|---|---|---|---|
| Super League 1 | 30 | 10 | 10 | 10 | 29 | 33 | −4 | 33.33 (Note: It is included the home game against Asteras Tripolis which Aris Thessaloniki lost 0-3 with w/o) |
| Greek Cup | 2 | 1 | 0 | 1 | 3 | 3 | +0 | 50.00 |
| Total | 32 | 11 | 10 | 11 | 32 | 36 | −4 | 34.38 |

Updated to match played 22 April 2012
Source: Competitions

==== Managers' overview ====
===== Sakis Tsiolis =====
| Competition | Record | | | | | | | |
| Competition | G | W | D | L | GF | GA | GD | Win % |
|---|---|---|---|---|---|---|---|---|
| Super League 1 | 6 | 0 | 4 | 2 | 2 | 6 | −4 | 0.00 |
| Greek Cup | 0 | 0 | 0 | 0 | 0 | 0 | +0 | — |
| Total | 6 | 0 | 4 | 2 | 2 | 6 | −4 | 0.00 |

Updated to match played 31 October 2011
Source: Competitions

===== Michał Probierz =====
| Competition | Record | | | | | | | |
| Competition | G | W | D | L | GF | GA | GD | Win % |
|---|---|---|---|---|---|---|---|---|
| Super League 1 | 8 | 3 | 1 | 4 | 9 | 8 | +1 | 37.50 |
| Greek Cup | 1 | 1 | 0 | 0 | 2 | 1 | +1 | 100.00 |
| Total | 9 | 4 | 1 | 4 | 11 | 9 | +2 | 44.44 |

Updated to match played 5 January 2012
Source: Competitions

===== Giannis Michalitsos =====
| Competition | Record | | | | | | | |
| Competition | G | W | D | L | GF | GA | GD | Win % |
|---|---|---|---|---|---|---|---|---|
| Super League 1 | 2 | 1 | 1 | 0 | 1 | 0 | +1 | 50.00 |
| Greek Cup | 1 | 0 | 0 | 1 | 1 | 2 | −1 | 0.00 |
| Total | 3 | 1 | 1 | 1 | 2 | 2 | +0 | 33.33 |

Updated to match played 15 January 2012
Source: Competitions

===== Manuel Machado =====
| Competition | Record | | | | | | | |
| Competition | G | W | D | L | GF | GA | GD | Win % |
|---|---|---|---|---|---|---|---|---|
| Super League 1 | 14 | 6 | 4 | 4 | 17 | 19 | −2 | 42.86 (Note: It is included the home game against Asteras Tripolis which Aris Thessaloniki lost 0-3 with w/o) |
| Greek Cup | 0 | 0 | 0 | 0 | 0 | 0 | +0 | — |
| Total | 14 | 6 | 4 | 4 | 17 | 19 | −2 | 42.86 |

Updated to match played 22 April 2012
Source: Competitions

=== Super League ===
==== Regular season ====
===== League table =====
| Pos | Team | Pld | W | D | L | GF | GA | GD | Pts |
|---|---|---|---|---|---|---|---|---|---|
| 7 | Levadiakos | 30 | 11 | 6 | 13 | 33 | 42 | −9 | 39 |
| 8 | PAS Giannina | 30 | 10 | 8 | 12 | 30 | 35 | −5 | 38 |
| 9 | Aris (Note: Aris was docked three points following an object thrown into the field during a match against Asteras Tripolis and lost the game 0–3.) | 30 | 10 | 10 | 10 | 29 | 33 | −4 | 37 (Note: Head-to-head points: Aris 6, OFI 0.) |
| 10 | OFI | 30 | 10 | 7 | 13 | 27 | 32 | −5 | 37 |
| 11 | Skoda Xanthi | 30 | 10 | 6 | 14 | 31 | 35 | −4 | 36 |

Source: Super League Greece
Rules for classification: 1) Points, 2) Head-to-head points, 3) Head-to-head goal difference.
If in current league table there are tied teams after applying criteria 1 to 3, they are considered to share places and listed in Greek language alphabetic order.
If in final league table there are still tied teams after applying criteria 1 to 3, a decision match (or matches if they are more than two) are to be played but only in three cases: to determine the champion, to fill spots in the play-off or to determine the teams to be relegated. In any other case, the final standings of tied teams are determined with a public draw

===== Results summary =====
| Overall | | | | | | | | Home | | | | | | Away | | | | | |
| Pld | W | D | L | GF | GA | GD | Pts | W | D | L | GF | GA | GD | W | D | L | GF | GA | GD |
|---|---|---|---|---|---|---|---|---|---|---|---|---|---|---|---|---|---|---|---|
| 30 | 10 | 10 | 10 | 29 | 33 | −4 | 40 | 7 | 5 | 3 | 19 | 14 | +5 | 3 | 5 | 7 | 10 | 19 | −9 |

(Note: The club finished with 37 points because it was docked three points and lost 0–3 the home game against Asteras Tripolis with w/o)

Last updated: 22 April 2012.
Source: Super League

===== Matches =====
| 27 August 2011 1 | PAS Giannina | 0 – 0 | Aris Thessaloniki | Ioannina |
| 21:30 | | Report | | Stadium: Zosimades Stadium; Attendance: 3.578; Referee: Stavros Tritsonis |

| 11 September 2011 2 | Aris Thessaloniki | 0 – 1 | Atromitos | Thessaloniki |
| 18:15 | | Report | Kostas Mitroglou 19' | Stadium: Kleanthis Vikelidis Stadium; Attendance: 8.551; Referee: Ilias Spathas |

| 2 October 2011 5 | Aris Thessaloniki | 0 – 0 | Skoda Xanthi | Thessaloniki |
| 16:00 | | Report | | Stadium: Kleanthis Vikelidis Stadium; Attendance: 9.322; Referee: Dimitrios Styliaras |

| 16 October 2011 6 | Ergotelis | 1 – 1 | Aris Thessaloniki | Heraklion |
| 18:15 | Mario Budimir 90+3' | Report | Khalifa Sankaré 45+1' | Stadium: Pankritio Stadium; Attendance: 789; Referee: Dimitrios Thanos |

| 23 October 2011 7 | Aris Thessaloniki | 1 – 1 | PAOK | Thessaloniki |
| 20:30 | Nikos Lazaridis 3' | Report | Thanasis Papazoglou 48' | Stadium: Kleanthis Vikelidis Stadium; Attendance: 12.320; Referee: Athanasios Giahos |

| 30 October 2011 8 | AEK Athens | 3 – 0 | Aris Thessaloniki | Athens |
| 17:15 | Nikos Lazaridis 10' (o.g.); Nikos Liberopoulos 39'; Juan Cala 78' | Report | | Stadium: Athens Olympic Stadium; Attendance: 6.379; Referee: Anastasios Kakos |

| 5 November 2011 9 | Aris Thessaloniki | 2 – 3 | Olympiacos | Thessaloniki |
| 19:30 | Juan Carlos Toja 77'; Ricardo Faty 85' | Report | Rafik Djebbour 7'; Francois Modesto 28'; Jean Makoun 83' | Stadium: Kleanthis Vikelidis Stadium; Attendance: 7.776; Referee: Anastasios Sidiropoulos |

| 20 November 2011 10 | OFI Crete | 0 – 1 | Aris Thessaloniki | Heraklion |
| 17:15 | | Report | Giannis Gianniotas 31' | Stadium: Theodoros Vardinogiannis Stadium; Attendance: 3.586; Referee: Christos Mitsios |

| 27 November 2011 11 | Panionios | 2 – 1 | Aris Thessaloniki | Athens |
| 17:15 | André Schembri 39'; Njazi Kuqi 58' | Report | Danijel Cesarec 73' | Stadium: Nea Smyrni Stadium; Attendance: 1.684; Referee: Stavros Tritsonis |

| 4 December 2011 12 | Aris Thessaloniki | 3 – 1 | Panathinaikos | Thessaloniki |
| 19:30 | Danijel Cesarec 12'; Francis Dickoh 44'; Darcy Dolce Neto 48' | Report | Jean-Alain Boumsong 38' | Stadium: Kleanthis Vikelidis Stadium; Attendance: 8.954; Referee: Ilias Spathas |

| 11 December 2011 13 | Asteras Tripolis | 1 – 0 | Aris Thessaloniki | Tripoli |
| 15:00 | Fernando Usero 31' | Report | | Stadium: Theodoros Kolokotronis Stadium; Attendance: 1.684; Referee: Dimitrios Thanos |

| 18 December 2011 14 | Aris Thessaloniki | 0 – 0 | Panetolikos | Thessaloniki |
| 17:15 | | Report | | Stadium: Kleanthis Vikelidis Stadium; Attendance: 7.362; Referee: Mihail Koukoulakis |

| 28 December 2011 3 | Aris Thessaloniki | 2 – 0 | Doxa Drama | Thessaloniki |
| 17:15 | Javier Umbides 13'; Kostas Kapetanos 79' | Report | | Stadium: Kleanthis Vikelidis Stadium; Attendance: 6.901; Referee: Mihail Voskakis |

| 4 January 2012 15 | Kerkyra | 1 – 0 | Aris Thessaloniki | Kerkyra |
| 15:00 | Juan Eduardo Martín 48' | Report | | Stadium: Kerkyra Stadium; Attendance: 1.067; Referee: Dimitrios Styliaras |

| 8 January 2012 16 | Aris Thessaloniki | 1 – 0 | PAS Giannina | Thessaloniki |
| 15:00 | Nery Castillo 12' | Report | | Stadium: Kleanthis Vikelidis Stadium; Attendance: 6.742; Referee: Haralambos Kalogeropoulos |

| 15 January 2012 17 | Atromitos | 0 – 0 | Aris Thessaloniki | Athens |
| 15:00 | | Report | | Stadium: Peristeri Stadium; Attendance: 1.541; Referee: Mihail Koukoulakis |

| 18 January 2012 4 | Levadiakos | 1 – 1 | Aris Thessaloniki | Livadeia |
| 17:15 | Lucas Favalli 54' | Report | Giannis Gianniotas 35' | Stadium: Levadia Municipal Stadium; Attendance: 589; Referee: Georgios Kominis |

| 22 January 2012 18 | Doxa Drama | 1 – 3 | Aris Thessaloniki | Thessaloniki |
| 15:00 | Amvrosios Papadopoulos 19' | Report | Noé Acosta 20'; Nery Castillo 31', 86' | Stadium: Kaftanzoglio Stadium; Attendance: 1.165; Referee: Anastasios Kakos |

| 29 January 2012 19 | Aris Thessaloniki | 2 – 1 | Levadiakos | Thessaloniki |
| 17:15 | Nery Castillo 50', 89' | Report | Chumbinho 5' | Stadium: Kleanthis Vikelidis Stadium; Attendance: 6.584; Referee: Dimitrios Thanos |

| 5 February 2012 20 | Skoda Xanthi | 0 – 2 | Aris Thessaloniki | Xanthi |
| 19:30 | | Report | Javier Umbides 59'; Nery Castillo 67' | Stadium: Xanthi FC Arena; Attendance: 1.218; Referee: Haralambos Kalogeropoulos |

| 12 February 2012 21 | Aris Thessaloniki | 1 – 1 | Ergotelis | Thessaloniki |
| 17:15 | Noé Acosta 14' | Report | Nikos Katsikokeris 31' | Stadium: Kleanthis Vikelidis Stadium; Attendance: 6.748; Referee: Georgios Daskalopoulos |

| 19 February 2012 22 | PAOK | 0 – 0 | Aris Thessaloniki | Thessaloniki |
| 19:30 | | Report | | Stadium: Toumba Stadium; Attendance: 16.041; Referee: Anastasios Sidiropoulos |

| 3 March 2012 23 | Aris Thessaloniki | 1 – 0 | AEK Athens | Thessaloniki |
| 19:30 | Nikos Lazaridis 79' | Report | | Stadium: Kleanthis Vikelidis Stadium; Attendance: 8.641; Referee: Anastasios Kakos |

| 11 March 2012 24 | Olympiacos | 3 – 0 | Aris Thessaloniki | Piraeus |
| 17:15 | Iván Marcano 18'; José Holebas 45+3' (pen.); Kevin Mirallas 69' | Report | | Stadium: Karaiskakis Stadium; Attendance: 21.221; Referee: Athanasios Giahos |

| 17 March 2012 25 | Aris Thessaloniki | 1 – 0 | OFI Crete | Thessaloniki |
| 17:15 | Nikos Lazaridis 73' | Report | | Stadium: Kleanthis Vikelidis Stadium; Attendance: 6.985; Referee: Dimitrios Styliaras |

| 24 March 2012 26 | Aris Thessaloniki | 4 – 2 | Panionios | Thessaloniki |
| 17:15 | Ricardo Faty 33'; Javier Umbides 72'; Vasilis Triantafyllakos 76'; Darcy Dolce Neto 78' | Report | Njazi Kuqi 39', 63' | Stadium: Kleanthis Vikelidis Stadium; Attendance: 7.295; Referee: Anastasios Kakos |

| 1 April 2012 27 | Panathinaikos | 1 – 0 | Aris Thessaloniki | Athens |
| 19:00 | Gergely Rudolf 82' | Report | | Stadium: Athens Olympic Stadium; Attendance: 0 Referee: Anastasios Sidiropoulos |

| 8 April 2012 28 | Aris Thessaloniki | 0 – 3 w/o | Asteras Tripolis | Thessaloniki |
| 19:00 | | , (in Greek) | | Stadium: Kleanthis Vikelidis Stadium; Attendance: 8.293; Referee: Stavros Tritsonis |

| 18 April 2012 29 | Panetolikos | 5 – 1 | Aris Thessaloniki | Agrinio |
| 19:00 | Giannis Pasas 11'; Henri Camara 45+1'; Angelos Charisteas 47'; Khalifa Sankaré 53' (o.g.); Ricardo Fernandes 76' | Report | Giannis Gianniotas 74' | Stadium: Panetolikos Stadium; Attendance: 3.014; Referee: Mihail Voskakis |

| 22 April 2012 30 | Aris Thessaloniki | 1 – 1 | Kerkyra | Thessaloniki |
| 19:00 | Noé Acosta 37' | Report | Ilias Ioannou 24' (pen.) | Stadium: Kleanthis Vikelidis Stadium; Attendance: 0 Referee: Andreas Pappas |

=== Greek Cup ===
Aris Thessaloniki entered in fourth round like all teams of Super League

==== Fourth Round ====
| 22 December 2011 Fourth Round | Panthrakikos | 1 – 2 | Aris Thessaloniki | Komotini |
| 19:00 | Balu 32' | Report | Karim Soltani 49'; Michel Pereira 74' | Stadium: Komotini Municipal Stadium; Referee: Andreas Pappas |

==== Fifth Round ====
| 12 January 2012 Fifth Round | Atromitos | 2 – 1 | Aris Thessaloniki | Athens |
| 20:00 | Sokratis Fyntanidis 79'; Kostas Mitroglou 90' | Report | Nery Castillo 46' | Stadium: Peristeri Stadium; Referee: Anastasios Sidiropoulos |

== Squad statistics ==
=== Appearances ===
As of match played 22 April 2012

| # | Position | Nat. | Player | Super League | | Greek Cup | | Total | |
| # | Position | Nat. | Player | Apps | Starts | Apps | Starts | Apps | Starts |
|---|---|---|---|---|---|---|---|---|---|
| 1 | GK | (Greece) | Markos Vellidis | 26 | 25 | 2 | 2 | 28 | 27 |
| 2 | DF | (Brazil) | Darcy Dolce Neto | 26 | 21 | 2 | 2 | 28 | 23 |
| 4 | DF | (Greece) | Grigoris Papazaharias | 14 | 10 | 1 | 0 | 15 | 10 |
| 5 | MG | (Greece) | Manolis Papasterianos | 9 | 8 | 1 | 1 | 10 | 9 |
| 6 | DF | (Brazil) / (Portugal) | Michel Pereira | 27 | 26 | 2 | 2 | 29 | 28 |
| 7 | FW | (Algeria) / (France) | Karim Soltani | 15 | 11 | 2 | 0 | 17 | 11 |
| 8 | MF | (Colombia) | Juan Carlos Toja | 13 | 10 | 1 | 1 | 14 | 11 |
| 10 | FW | (Mexico) / (Uruguay) | Nery Castillo | 20 | 18 | 1 | 1 | 21 | 19 |
| 12 | MF | (Greece) | Giorgos Katidis | 12 | 12 | 1 | 1 | 13 | 13 |
| 13 | GK | (Greece) | Michalis Sifakis | 4 | 4 | 0 | 0 | 4 | 4 |
| 14 | MF | (Senegal) / (France) | Ricardo Faty | 26 | 24 | 1 | 1 | 27 | 25 |
| 15 | DF | (Greece) | Michalis Giannitsis | 0 | 0 | 0 | 0 | 0 | 0 |
| 16 | DF | (Ghana) / (Denmark) | Francis Dickoh | 15 | 15 | 2 | 2 | 17 | 17 |
| 17 | MF | (Greece) | Konstantinos Kaznaferis | 19 | 18 | 2 | 2 | 21 | 20 |
| 19 | DF | (Senegal) | Khalifa Sankaré | 23 | 22 | 0 | 0 | 23 | 22 |
| 20 | FW | (Greece) | Giannis Gianniotas | 19 | 10 | 1 | 1 | 20 | 11 |
| 21 | MF | (Greece) | Kostas Kapetanos | 23 | 15 | 1 | 0 | 24 | 15 |
| 22 | FW | (Greece) | Thanasis Kanoulas | 5 | 1 | 0 | 0 | 5 | 1 |
| 24 | DF | (Greece) | Nikos Lazaridis | 24 | 22 | 2 | 1 | 26 | 23 |
| 25 | GK | (Greece) | Sokratis Dioudis | 0 | 0 | 0 | 0 | 0 | 0 |
| 28 | MF | (Greece) | Vassilis Triantafyllakos | 13 | 5 | 0 | 0 | 13 | 5 |
| 30 | DF | (Greece) | Dimitris Kotsonis | 1 | 1 | 0 | 0 | 1 | 1 |
| 33 | MF | (Argentina) | Javier Umbides | 25 | 25 | 2 | 2 | 27 | 27 |
| 35 | DF | (Greece) | Stelios Tsoukanis | 6 | 4 | 0 | 0 | 6 | 4 |
| 55 | MF | (Greece) | Sakis Prittas | 10 | 6 | 1 | 0 | 11 | 6 |
| 77 | FW | (Spain) | Noé Acosta | 19 | 13 | 0 | 0 | 19 | 13 |
| 84 | GK | (Switzerland) / (Bosnia and Herzegovina) | Eldin Jakupović | 1 | 1 | 0 | 0 | 1 | 1 |
| 88 | MF | (Bolivia) | Nacho García | 0 | 0 | 0 | 0 | 0 | 0 |
Players who left the club during this season
| | DF | (Albania) | Kristi Vangjeli | 1 | 1 | 0 | 0 | 1 | 1 |
| | FW | (Greece) | Nikos Angeloudis | 1 | 0 | 0 | 0 | 1 | 0 |
| | FW | (Romania) | Victoraș Iacob | 8 | 4 | 0 | 0 | 8 | 4 |
| | MF | (Croatia) | Jurica Vranješ | 2 | 1 | 0 | 0 | 2 | 1 |
| | MF | (Spain) | Cristian Portilla | 1 | 0 | 0 | 0 | 1 | 0 |
| | FW | (Croatia) | Danijel Cesarec | 8 | 7 | 1 | 1 | 9 | 8 |
| | DF | (Greece) | Charalampos Oikonomopoulos | 0 | 0 | 1 | 1 | 1 | 1 |
| | FW | (Greece) | Thanasis Topouzis | 1 | 0 | 0 | 0 | 1 | 0 |
| Total | | | | 30 | | 2 | | 32 | |

=== Goals ===
As of match played 22 April 2012

| Ranking | Position | Nat. | Player | Super League | Greek Cup | Total |
|---|---|---|---|---|---|---|
| 1 | FW | (Mexico) / (Italy) | Nery Castillo | 6 | 1 | 7 |
| 2 | DF | (Greece) | Nikos Lazaridis | 3 | 0 | 3 |
| 2 | MF | (Argentina) | Javier Umbides | 3 | 0 | 3 |
| 2 | FW | (Spain) | Noé Acosta | 3 | 0 | 3 |
| 2 | FW | (Greece) | Giannis Gianniotas | 3 | 0 | 3 |
| 6 | FW | (Croatia) | Danijel Cesarec | 2 | 0 | 2 |
| 6 | MF | (Senegal) / (France) | Ricardo Faty | 2 | 0 | 2 |
| 6 | DF | (Brazil) | Darcy Dolce Neto | 2 | 0 | 2 |
| 9 | MF | (Colombia) | Juan Toja | 1 | 0 | 1 |
| 9 | MF | (Greece) | Kostas Kapetanos | 1 | 0 | 1 |
| 9 | DF | (Ghana) / (Denmark) | Francis Dickoh | 1 | 0 | 1 |
| 9 | DF | (Senegal) | Khalifa Sankaré | 1 | 0 | 1 |
| 9 | MF | (Greece) | Vasilis Triantafyllakos | 1 | 0 | 1 |
| 9 | FW | (Algeria) / (France) | Karim Soltani | 0 | 1 | 1 |
| 9 | DF | (Brazil) / (Italy) | Michel Pereira | 0 | 1 | 1 |
| Own Goals | | | | 0 | 0 | 0 |
| Total | | | | 29 | 3 | 32 |

=== Clean sheets ===
If a goalkeeper was substituted and he did not conceded a goal while he was in the game but the team conceded a goal after him, the goalkeeper would not claim the clean sheet.

As of match played 22 April 2012

| # | Nat. | Player | Super League 1 | Greek Cup | Total |
|---|---|---|---|---|---|
| 1 | (Greece) | Markos Vellidis | 10 | 0 | 10 |
| 13 | (Greece) | Michalis Sifakis | 1 | 0 | 1 |
| Total | | | 11 | 0 | 11 |

== Kit ==
Supplier: Under Armour
Sponsor(s): Kino

| Home; Colours | Away; Colours | Third; Colours | Goalkeeper's Home Colours | Goalkeeper's Away Colours |

Source: arisfc.gr
