= Carlos Matallanas =

Spanish sports journalist and writer (1981–2021)

- Born: 18 April 1981; Madrid, Spain
- Died: 9 March 2021 (aged 39); Seville, Spain
- Occupation: Sports Journalist

Carlos Matallanas (18 April 1981 – 9 March 2021) was a Spanish sports journalist and writer. A former soccer player, his analyses mostly focused on that sport.

== Biography ==
In summer 2013, Matallanas began suffering from amyotrophic lateral sclerosis (ALS), although he was not diagnosed for another year, when he retired from playing football. He also left all of his recently begun coaching roles. In 2014, he entered journalism, contributing to El Confidencial with articles about his everyday life suffering from ALS. He also worked with Diario AS in a blog called "Silencio, se juega" and had a book published titled La vida es un juego. Estrategia para Mario y Blanca. The book was written as he was already bedridden and tetraplegic.

In 2015, before his tetraplegia worsened, he received the Bronze Medal of the Royal Order of Sports Merit, presented by Miguel Cardenal, for his fight against ALS and uplifting of sportsman values. In 2018, the Association of Spanish Footballers created the Premio Carlos Matallanas for short novels, bringing together his passions for literature and football.

At the end of 2014, Matallanas organized a friendly match at Estadio Fernando Torres to raise money and awareness for ALS patients. It was the last time he ever was able to play in a football match.

By 2016, Matallanas was unable to speak. In a documentary interview titled "Fútbol y Vida" that year, his brother, Gonzalo, read his texts. These texts ended up becoming published as a book José Antonio Martín titled ¿Quién dijo rendirse?.

In 2017, Matallanas' former coach at Racing Club Portuense, Mere, hired him as an analyst. He was then hired by CF Fuenlabrada and helped the club rise to the Segunda División and ended up the league's champion in 2019. He left the club midway through the next season along with the dismissal of their coach. In summer 2020, he signed with AD Alcorcón.

Carlos Matallanas died of complications from ALS in Seville on 9 March 2021 at the age of 39.
