= Kapetanos =

Kapetanos (Greek: Καπετάνος) is a Greek surname. Notable people with the surname include:

- Kostas Kapetanos (born 1984), Greek football midfielder, brother of Pantelis
- Pantelis Kapetanos (born 1983), Greek football striker
