= Eldin Jakupović =

Bosnian-Swiss footballer (born 1984)

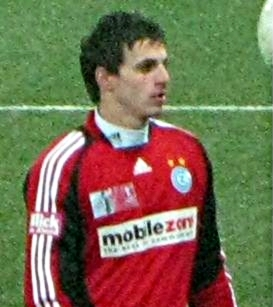
- Jakupović with Grasshoppers in 2009

Personal information
- Full name: Eldin Jakupović
- Date of birth: 2 October 1984 (age 42)
- Place of birth: Kozarac, SR Bosnia and Herzegovina, Yugoslavia
- Height: 1.91 m (6 ft 3 in)
- Position: Goalkeeper

Team information
- Current team: Chattanooga FC
- Number: 1

Youth career
- –2004: Grasshoppers

Senior career*
Years	Team	Apps	(Gls)
2004–2005	Grasshoppers	13	(0)
2005–2006	FC Thun	22	(0)
2006–2009	Lokomotiv Moscow	20	(0)
2007–2009	→ Grasshoppers (loan)	57	(1)
2010–2011	Olympiakos Volos	33	(0)
2011–2012	Aris	1	(0)
2012–2017	Hull City	33	(0)
2014	→ Leyton Orient (loan)	4	(0)
2014	→ Leyton Orient (loan)	9	(0)
2017–2022	Leicester City	2	(0)
2022–2023	Everton	0	(0)
2023	Los Angeles FC	2	(0)
2024–	Chattanooga FC	28	(0)

International career
2005	Bosnia and Herzegovina U21	2	(0)
2006	Switzerland U21	1	(0)
2008	Switzerland	1	(0)
- * Club domestic league appearances and goals as of 20:26, 17 October 2025 (UTC)

Eldin Jakupović (Bosnian pronunciation: [jakǔːpoʋitɕ]; born 2 October 1984) is a professional footballer who plays as a goalkeeper for MLS Next Pro club Chattanooga FC.

He started his professional career at Grasshopper Club Zürich in 2004, then moved to FC Thun a year later. After success there, Jakupović joined FC Lokomotiv Moscow in March 2006. He returned to Grasshoppers on loan spending two seasons there. In 2010, he moved to Greece joining Olympiacos Volos. In September 2011, after one season at Olympiacos Volos, he joined Aris. In 2012, he moved to Hull City. In 2017, he left Hull City after their relegation back to the EFL Championship to join Premier League side Leicester City. After leaving Leicester City, he joined fellow Premier League team Everton on a free transfer in September 2022.

Having played at under-21 level for both Bosnia and Switzerland, he earned his only senior cap for the latter in 2008, and was part of their squad at UEFA Euro 2008.

== Club career ==
=== Early career ===
Jakupović was born in Kozarac, SFR Yugoslavia, present-day Bosnia and Herzegovina. He moved to Switzerland at a young age due to the Bosnian War and started his professional career at Grasshopper Club Zürich in 2004. He then moved to FC Thun in 2005. After a successful spell at FC Thun, Jakupović joined FC Lokomotiv Moscow in March 2006.

=== Grasshoppers ===
Jakupović returned to former club to Grasshopper Club Zürich on a year-long loan on 30 August 2007. He scored a 94th-minute equaliser against BSC Young Boys in his third match for the club, earning Grasshoppers a 3–3 draw. During the season Jakupović forced Fabio Coltorti to the bench as his backup. At the end of the 2007–08 season, Jakupović extended his loan at Grasshoppers for another year, which meant new signing goalkeeper Massimo Colomba was benched.

=== Lokomotiv return ===
On 31 August 2009, Jakupović was confirmed as part of the Lokomotiv Moscow squad, with Ivan Pelizzoli leaving on loan to join AlbinoLeffe. Due to the number of foreigners in the Lokomotiv squad, Jakupović was asked to go out on loan again. In December, Jakupović went on trial at Tottenham Hotspur and had a successful week. However, due to various reasons a deal could not be completed with Lokomotiv Moscow. After a turbulent time with the Lokomotiv management, Jakupović was allowed to be released.

=== Olympiacos Volos ===
Jakupović had a fine season with Olympiacos Volos. After they were relegated to the Delta Ethniki, Jakupović left the team.

=== Aris ===
On 30 September 2011, Jakupović joined Aris, with three other ex-teammates, Noe Acosta, Javier Umbides and Khalifa Sankare. He made his debut on 5 November 2011, against Olympiacos, which finished 2–3.

=== Hull City ===
On 20 March 2012, Jakupović joined English Championship club Hull City on trial, and after impressing in training and a friendly match Hull manager Nick Barmby expressed a desire to sign Jakupović on a permanent contract. Following the sacking of Nick Barmby, Jakupović had trials with Ipswich Town. On 9 July 2012, Jakupović signed for Hull City on a two-year contract, becoming Steve Bruce's first full signing as manager. He officially joined the team on their pre-season training session in Portugal. He made his debut in a 3–1 friendly win against North Ferriby United on 16 July 2012. His first Championship match for The Tigers came on 21 December 2012 at Derby County, when he played in a 2–1 victory as Hull moved into second place in the Championship table. This was followed up by three more league appearances, all of which consisted of clean sheets.

In January 2014 Jakupović joined Leyton Orient on loan until 8 February. On 29 January 2014, Jakupović was recalled to parent club Hull City. On 13 February 2014, Jakupović re-joined Leyton Orient until 17 May 2014, but was again recalled on 27 March 2014.

On 9 July 2014, Jakupović signed a new two-year contract with Hull City, and began their Premier League campaign as third-choice goalkeeper behind Allan McGregor and Steven Harper. He made his first appearance of the season on 18 October away to Arsenal as a substitute when Harper injured his arm before half-time, and did not concede until Danny Welbeck equalised for 2–2 in added time. A week later he started for the first time in the division, keeping a clean sheet in a goalless draw against Liverpool.

Jakupović started for Hull against Arsenal in the FA Cup fifth round on 20 February 2016, at the Emirates Stadium. He made 12 saves to earn his side a 0–0 draw, which led to a replay at the KC Stadium.

On 24 June 2016, Jakupović signed a new two-year deal with Hull City. Since McGregor was out with a back injury that ruled him out for about six months, Jakupović started off the 2016–17 season against Premier League Champions, Leicester City and helped earn the Tigers a 2–1 victory on opening day.

=== Leicester City ===
In July 2017, following Hull City's relegation back to the second tier of English football, Jakupović signed a three-year deal with Premier League side Leicester City. He made his debut in the FA Cup third round match against Fleetwood Town. He signed a one-year contract extension in June 2020.

On 10 June 2022, it was announced that Jakupović would be released from Leicester City upon expiry of his contract at the end of the month.

=== Everton ===
Jakupović's Leicester contract expired in June 2022. Two months later he signed for Everton until the end of the year as a back-up keeper, following injuries to first and third choices Jordan Pickford and Andy Lonergan.

=== Los Angeles FC ===
On 9 January 2023, Jakupović signed a one-year contract with Los Angeles FC. On 8 April 2023, Jakupović made his debut and kept a clean sheet against Austin FC, which Los Angeles FC won 3–0.

== International career ==
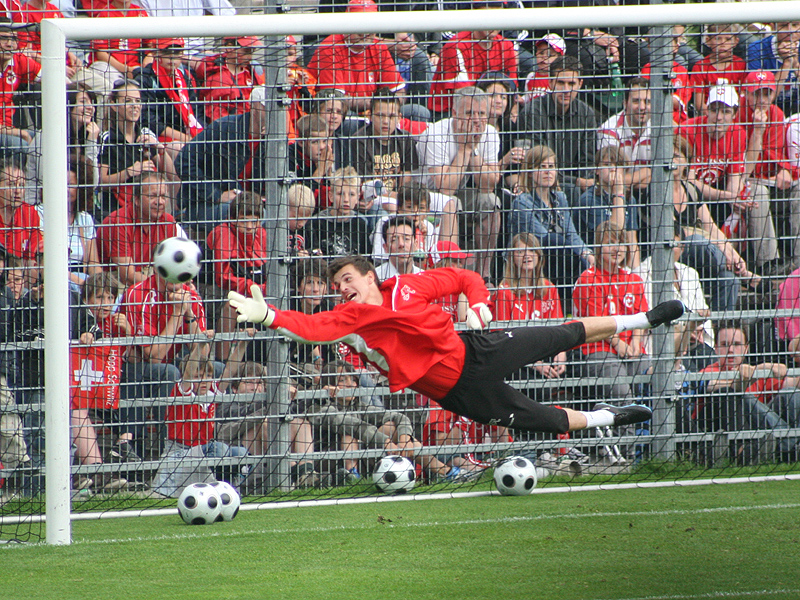
Jakupović in training for the Swiss national team in June 2008

Jakupović has dual citizenship, both Bosnian and Swiss, and has represented both at under-21 level.

He has played for Bosnia and Herzegovina U21 for two competitive matches, and a friendly match against Austria U21 for Switzerland on 1 March 2006.

In August 2005, Jakupović received his first call-up to the Bosnia and Herzegovina national squad which was a match against Belgium and Lithuania, however he did not accept the call up. In March 2007, Jakupović was asked again to play for the senior Bosnia and Herzegovina against Norway, but declined the offer.

Jakupović was included in the Swiss UEFA Euro 2008 squad as one of the two substitutes for Diego Benaglio, the first-choice goalkeeper at the time. He made his debut on 20 August 2008, in a friendly match against Cyprus. He was called up for the first two matches of 2010 FIFA World Cup qualification, but was an unused substitute.

In October 2008, Jakupović said that he would not play again for the Swiss national team due to family reasons.

== Career statistics ==
=== Club ===
As of match played 18 May 2023

Appearances and goals by club, season and competition
Club	Season	League			National cup		League cup		Europe		Other		Total	
Club	Season	Division	Apps	Goals	Apps	Goals	Apps	Goals	Apps	Goals	Apps	Goals	Apps	Goals
Grasshoppers	2003–04	Swiss Super League	0	0	0	0	—		0	0	—		0	0
Grasshoppers	2004–05	Swiss Super League	13	0	0	0	—		0	0	—		13	0
Grasshoppers	Total		13	0	0	0	—		0	0	—		13	0
FC Thun	2005–06	Swiss Super League	22	0	0	0	—		10 (Note: Appearances in UEFA Champions League)	0	—		32	0
Lokomotiv Moscow	2006	Russian Premier League	5	0	0	0	—		0	0	—		5	0
Lokomotiv Moscow	2007	Russian Premier League	15	0	0	0	—		0	0	—		15	0
Lokomotiv Moscow	Total		20	0	0	0	—		10	0	—		20	0
Grasshoppers (loan)	2007–08	Swiss Super League	23	1	0	0	—		—		—		23	1
Grasshoppers (loan)	2008–09	Swiss Super League	34	0	0	0	—		2 (Note: Appearances in UEFA Europa League)	0	—		36	0
Grasshoppers (loan)	Total		57	1	0	0	—		2	0	—		59	1
Olympiacos Volos	2010–11	Super League Greece	33	0	3	0	—		—		—		36	0
Olympiacos Volos	2011–12	Super League Greece	—		—		—		3	0	—		3	0
Olympiacos Volos	Total		33	0	3	0	—		3	0	—		39	0
Aris	2011–12	Super League Greece	1	0	0	0	—		—		—		1	0
Hull City	2012–13	Championship	5	0	3	0	0	0	—		—		8	0
Hull City	2013–14	Premier League	1	0	0	0	1	0	—		—		2	0
Hull City	2014–15	Premier League	3	0	0	0	0	0	—		—		3	0
Hull City	2015–16	Championship	2	0	4	0	5	0	—		3 (Note: Appearances in EFL Championship play-offs)	0	14	0
Hull City	2016–17	Premier League	22	0	2	0	2	0	—		—		26	0
Hull City	Total		33	0	9	0	8	0	—		3	0	53	0
Leyton Orient (loan)	2013–14	League One	13	0	—		—		—		—		13	0
Leicester City	2017–18	Premier League	2	0	2	0	0	0	—		—		4	0
Leicester City	2018–19	Premier League	0	0	0	0	0	0	—		—		0	0
Leicester City	2019–20	Premier League	0	0	0	0	0	0	—		—		0	0
Leicester City	2020–21	Premier League	0	0	0	0	0	0	0	0	—		0	0
Leicester City	2021–22	Premier League	0	0	0	0	0	0	0	0	—		0	0
Leicester City	Total		2	0	2	0	0	0	0	0	—		4	0
Everton	2022–23	Premier League	0	0	0	0	0	0	—		—		0	0
Los Angeles FC	2023	Major League Soccer	2	0	2	0	—		0	0	—		4	0
Career total			196	1	16	0	8	0	15	0	3	0	238	1

=== International ===
As of 20 August 2008

Appearances and goals by national team and year
National team	Year	Apps	Goals
Switzerland	2008	1	0
Total		1	0

== Honours ==
Hull City

- Football League Championship play-offs: 2016
- Custom Athletics Cup: 2024
