= Luis Basagaña =

Andorran footballer

Personal information
- Full name: Luis Basagaña Soto
- Date of birth: 9 August 1963
- Place of birth: Andorra la Vella, Andorra
- Position: Midfielder

Senior career*
Years	Team	Apps	(Gls)
- CF Damm
–1984	Unió Esportiva Canovelles		
1984–1985	RCD Espanyol	1	(0)
- * Club domestic league appearances and goals

Luis Basagaña Soto or Lluís (born 9 August 1963 in Andorra la Vella, Andorra) is an Andorran former footballer who last played for RCD Espanyol of the Spanish Primera División for the 1984–85 season. He is the first Andorran to have played in La Liga.

== RCD Espanyol ==
Switching to RCD Espanyol of the Spanish top division for the 1984-85 season, Basagaña made his first-team debut on 9 September 1984, a 1–5 defeat to Valencia CF; that same day, the Association of Spanish Footballers went on striker and remonstrated against the Spanish Football Federation for various reasons.

He also featured in the Copa del Rey through his time with the club.
