= Tobi Adeleke =

Nigerian footballer (born 2003)

Personal information
- Full name: Adeleke Oluwatobi Babatunde
- Date of birth: 10 March 2003 (age 23)
- Place of birth: Ijoko, Nigeria
- Height: 1.81 m (5 ft 11 in)
- Position: Midfielder

Team information
- Current team: Makedonikos
- Number: 14

Youth career
- –2020: Prince Kazeem Academy
- 2020–2021: Chabab Mohammédia

Senior career*
Years	Team	Apps	(Gls)
2021–2023	Chabab Mohammédia	1	(0)
2023	KTP	0	(0)
2023	→ MP (loan)	22	(1)
2024–2025	Varnsdorf	18	(1)
2025	Baník Most	16	(2)
2025–	Makedonikos	11	(0)

International career^{‡}
2018	Nigeria U16	3	(0)
- * Club domestic league appearances and goals as of 20 April 2026 ‡ National team caps and goals as of 9 March 2024

Adeleke Oluwatobi Babatunde (born 10 March 2003), better known as Tobi Adeleke, is a Nigerian professional footballer who plays for Super League Greece 2 club Makedonikos as a midfielder.

== Club career ==
Babatunde made his senior debut with Moroccan club Chabab Mohammédia in top-tier Botola Pro in 2021.

On 31 January 2023, he signed with newly promoted Veikkausliiga club Kotkan Työväen Palloilijat (KTP) in Finland. However, on 28 February 2023, he was loaned out to Mikkelin Palloilijat (MP) in second-tier Ykkönen.

On 23 February 2024, Babatunde moved to Czech Republic after signing with FK Varnsdorf in the second-tier Czech National Football League (FNL).

== Career statistics ==
As of 2 April 2025

Appearances and goals by club, season and competition
Club	Season	League			National cup (Note: Includes Suomen Cup and Czech Cup)		League cup (Note: Includes Ykköscup)		Continental		Total	
Club	Season	Division	Apps	Goals	Apps	Goals	Apps	Goals	Apps	Goals	Apps	Goals
Chabab Mohammédia	2021–22	Botola Pro	1	0	0	0	–		–		1	0
KTP	2023	Veikkausliiga	0	0	0	0	0	0	–		0	0
MP (loan)	2023	Ykkösliiga	22	1	2	1	1	0	–		25	2
MP II (loan)	2023	Kolmonen	1	0	–		–		–		1	0
Varnsdorf	2023–24	Czech National Football League	8	0	0	0	–		–		8	0
Varnsdorf	2024–25	FNL	10	1	2	0	–		–		12	1
Varnsdorf	Total		18	1	2	0	0	0	0	0	20	1
Baník Most	2024–25	Bohemian Football League	5	1	–		–		–		5	1
Career total			47	3	4	1	1	0	0	0	52	4
