= Andi Renja =

Albanian footballer

Andi Renjadi Victorenja
Personal information
- Date of birth: 6 January 1993 (age 33)
- Place of birth: Korçë, Albania
- Height: 1.78 m (5 ft 10 in)
- Position: Winger

Team information
- Current team: FC Thalwil

Senior career*
Years	Team	Apps	(Gls)
2010–2014	Aris	16	(2)
2015	Chania	4	(0)
2016	Panegialios		
2016–2017	Diagoras Sevasti		
2017	Levski Karlovo	8	(1)
2017–2018	Pirin Blagoevgrad	17	(2)
2018	Vitosha Bistritsa	5	(0)
2019-2020	Luftëtari	10	(0)
2021–2024	FC Kosova Zurich	52	(6)
2024–	FC Thalwil	4	(1)
- * Club domestic league appearances and goals as of 27 April 2024

Andi Renja (born 1 June 1993) is an Albanian footballer who plays as a winger for Swiss fifth-tier 2. Liga club FC Thalwil.

== Club career ==
=== Aris ===
He started his career in youth teams of Aris. During the 2012–2013 season, he was promoted him to the first team by manager Lucas Alcaraz.

=== Pirin ===
After spending a half season in Levski Karlovo in the Bulgarian Second League, he joined Pirin Blagoevgrad's summer camp on trials and later signed with the club from Bulgarian First League. At the end of the season the club had to release him to carry out regular military service.

=== Vitosha ===
On 17 July 2018, Renja signed with Vitosha Bistritsa.

== Career statistics ==
Club	Season	SuperLeague		Football League		Gamma Ethniki		Greek Cup		Gamma Ethniki Cup		Total	
Club	Season	Apps	Goals	Apps	Goals	Apps	Goals	Apps	Goals	Apps	Goals	Apps	Goals
Aris Thessaloniki	2012–13	1	0	0	0	0	0	0	0	0	0	1	0
Aris Thessaloniki	2013–14	3	0	0	0	0	0	0	0	0	0	3	0
Aris Thessaloniki	2014–15	0	0	0	0	11	0	0	0	3	1	14	1
Aris Thessaloniki	Total	4	0	0	0	11	0	0	0	3	1	18	1
AO Chania	2014–15	0	0	4	0	0	0	1	0	0	0	5	0
AO Chania	Total	0	0	4	0	0	0	1	0	0	0	5	0
Career total		4	0	4	0	11	0	1	0	3	1	23	1
