= Amvrosios Papadopoulos =

Greek footballer (born 1989)

Personal information
- Date of birth: 10 January 1989 (age 37)
- Place of birth: Kavala, Greece
- Height: 1.84 m (6 ft 1/2 in)
- Position: Midfielder

Senior career*
Years	Team	Apps	(Gls)
2007–2010	Skoda Xanthi	4	(0)
2010	→ Thrasyvoulos (loan)	0	(0)
2010	Makedonikos	10	(0)
2011	Kozani	3	(0)
2011	Orfeas Eleftheroupoli	12	(1)
2012–2014	Doxa Drama	14	(1)
2014–2015	Kavala	0	(0)
2016	Apollon Pontus	0	(0)
2017	Triglia	0	(0)
2017–2018	Stratoni	0	(0)
2018	Thermaikos	0	(0)
2018	Agrotikos Asteras		
2021–2022	Akrites Sykies		

International career^{‡}
2005	Greece U17	3	(0)
- * Club domestic league appearances and goals as of 22 January 2012 ‡ National team caps and goals as of 7 January 2011

Amvrosios Papadopoulos (Greek: Αμβρόσιος Παπαδόπουλος, born 10 January 1989) is a professional Greek footballer.

== Club career ==
He started his professional career with Skoda Xanthi in 2007. In January 2010, he moved to Beta Ethniki side Thrasyvoulos on loan, but left after 4 months on 23 April 2010. He subsequently joined Makedonikos, Kozani and Delta Ethniki side Orfeas Eleftheroupoli. He moved to current club Doxa Drama on 16 January 2012, where he scored on his debut.

== International career ==
Amvrosios was a former Greece U17 international. He made his debut in a UEFA European U-17 Championship qualifier against Bosnia & Herzegovina.
