= Thanasis Topouzis =

Greek basketball player

Personal information
- Full name: Athanasios Topouzis
- Date of birth: 28 March 1992 (age 34)
- Place of birth: Thessaloniki, Greece
- Height: 1.86 m (6 ft 1 in)
- Position: Striker

Team information
- Current team: AO Chanioti

Youth career
- –2010: Iraklis
- 2010–2011: Aris

Senior career*
Years	Team	Apps	(Gls)
2011–2012	Aris	1	(0)
2012–2014	Salernitana	11	(1)
2014	→ Ascoli (loan)	5	(0)
2014–2015	Evros Soufli	0	(0)
2015–2016	Agrotikos Asteras	27	(0)
2016–2018	Ermis Zoniana	0	(0)
2018	OFI	2	(0)
2018–2019	Ierapetra		
2019–2021	Almyros Gaziou		
2021	Poseidon Michaniona		
2021–2022	Makedonikos		
2022–	AO Chanioti		
- * Club domestic league appearances and goals as of 23 October 2023

Thanasis Topouzis (Greek: Θανάσης Τοπούζης, born 28 March 1992) is a Greek professional footballer who plays as a striker.

== Club career ==
=== Youth career ===
He started his career in the youth teams of Iraklis, and was transferred to Aris in December 2010. He was a member, and second top scorer, of the team who won the U20 championship for Aris in 2011.

=== Senior career ===
He made his debut in the Super League Greece during a home game against Atromitos, where he came as a substitute in the 78th minute. He moved in August 2012 to Lega Pro Seconda Divisione club Salernitana.
