= Pantelis Antoniadis =

Greek footballer (born 1994)

Personal information
- Full name: Panteleimon Antoniadis
- Date of birth: 23 March 1994 (age 32)
- Place of birth: Thessaloniki, Greece
- Height: 1.75 m (5 ft 9 in)
- Position: Central midfielder

Youth career
- 2010–2011: Aris

Senior career*
Years	Team	Apps	(Gls)
2012–2014	Aris	1	(0)
2014	→ Kampaniakos (loan)	11	(0)
2014–2015	Kampaniakos	0	(0)
2015–2016	Aiginiakos	1	(0)
2016	Kissamikos	1	(0)
2017–2018	Aiginiakos	29	(0)
2018–	Kalamata	0	(0)

International career
2012–	Greece U19	2	(0)
- * Club domestic league appearances and goals as of 8 July 2018

Pantelis Antoniadis (Greek: Παντελής Αντωνιάδης; born 23 March 1994) is a Greek midfielder currently playing for Kalamata. He plays as a midfielder and came up through the club's youth ranks.

== Club career ==
=== Aris ===
He started his career in youth teams of Aris. During the 2012–2013 season, head coach Makis Katsavakis promoted him to the first team, being a member of Greece U19 team.
