= Thomas Karaberis =

Greek footballer

Personal information
- Date of birth: 29 January 2002 (age 24)
- Place of birth: Thessaloniki, Greece
- Height: 1.86 m (6 ft 1 in)
- Position: Defensive midfielder

Team information
- Current team: Apollon Kalamarias
- Number: 10

Youth career
- 2012–2021: PAOK

Senior career*
| Years | Team | Apps | (Gls) |
| 2021–2023 | Panserraikos | 20 | (0) |
| 2023–2024 | Kaiserslautern II | 19 | (5) |
| 2024–2025 | Doxa Katokopias | 9 | (0) |
| 2025 | Ethnikos Neo Keramidi | 3 | (0) |
| 2025–2026 | Makedonikos | 21 | (0) |
| 2026– | Apollon Kalamarias | 0 | (0) |

International career^{‡}
| 2018–2019 | Greece U17 | 11 | (0) |
| 2022–2023 | Greece U21 | 5 | (0) |
- * Club domestic league appearances and goals as of 20 April 2026 ‡ National team caps and goals as of 31 January 2024

Thomas Karaberis (Greek: Θωμάς Καραμπέρης; born 29 January 2002) is a Greek professional footballer who plays as a midfielder for Super League 2 club Apollon Kalamarias.
