= Stergios Paraskevas =

Greek footballer

Personal information
- Date of birth: 11 February 2001 (age 25)
- Place of birth: Drama, Greece
- Height: 1.70 m (5 ft 7 in)
- Position: Right-back

Team information
- Current team: Makedonikos
- Number: 32

Youth career
- 2008–2018: Doxa Drama

Senior career*
Years	Team	Apps	(Gls)
2018–2021	Doxa Drama	31	(0)
2021–2023	Almopos Aridea	52	(1)
2023–2024	AEL	1	(0)
2024–2025	Diagoras	22	(1)
2026–	Makedonikos	12	(0)
- * Club domestic league appearances and goals as of 26 April 2026

Stergios Paraskevas (Greek: Στέργιος Παρασκευάς; born 11 February 2001) is a Greek professional footballer who plays as a right-back for Super League 2 club Makedonikos.
