= Haris Stamboulidis =

Association football player

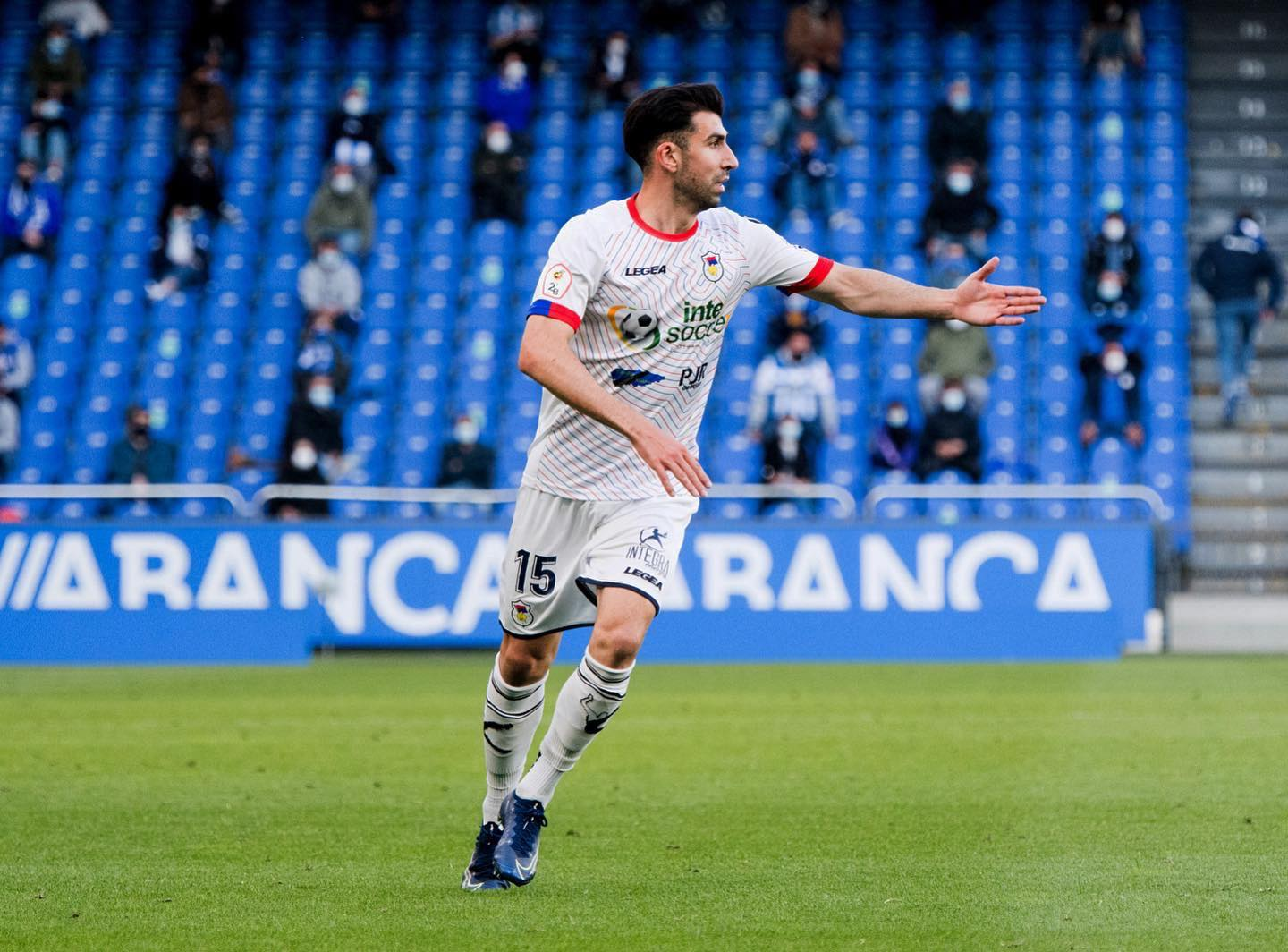
- Stamboulidis playing for UP Langreo in 2021

Personal information
- Full name: Charalampos Stamboulidis
- Date of birth: 22 June 1996 (age 30)
- Place of birth: Melbourne, Victoria, Australia
- Height: 1.86 m (6 ft 1 in)
- Positions: Defender; midfielder

Youth career
- 2005–2006: Diego Forlan Academy
- Heidelberg United
- Essendon Royals
- Northcote City
- Heidelberg United
- 2014–2015: Melbourne City
- 2016: New York Red Bulls

College career
Years	Team	Apps	(Gls)
2015–2017	Columbia Lions	40	(0)

Senior career*
Years	Team	Apps	(Gls)
2013–2014	Heidelberg United	14	(0)
2014-2015	Melbourne City NPL	11	(0)
2017–2018	Colorado Rapids U-23	14	(0)
2018–2019	Aris	0	(0)
2019–2020	Extremadura	0	(0)
2020–2021	Langreo	6	(0)
2021–2022	Almopos Aridea	2	(0)
2022	Irodotos	5	(0)
2022–2024	Veria	0	(0)
2024–2025	Sabah	7	(0)
2025–2026	Makedonikos	9	(0)

International career
2014	Australia U19 Schoolboys	10	(0)
2015	Greece U19	2	(0)
- * Club domestic league appearances and goals as of 20 April 2026

Charalampos "Haris" Stamboulidis (Greek: Χαράλαμπος Σταμπουλίδης; born 22 June 1996) is a professional footballer who plays as a defender or midfielder.

Born in Australia, Stamboulidis represented Greece internationally at under-19 level.

== Early life ==
Born in Melbourne, Victoria, Stamboulidis lived for an extended period in Uruguay in 2005/2006 between the age of 9 to 10, where he trained at Diego Forlán's football academy in Montevideo. Upon returning to Australia, he progressed through the youth systems of Heidelberg United, Essendon Royals, Northcote City, before returning to Heidelberg.

== Club career ==
=== Early career ===
Stamboulidis captained the U13 and U14 Victorian State teams and earned a spot in the U13 Qantas Socceroos 30-man squad. In 2007, he won the Victorian State School Championship amongst a participation of 1,600 schools with Ivanhoe East Primary School.

In 2013, aged 16, Stamboulidis was part of the senior squad at Heidelberg United FC which won the year's Victorian State League 1. In 2014, he joined A-League side Melbourne City FC, and was a part of both their National Youth League Premiership team (NYL) and their senior National Premier Leagues Victoria 2 team (NPL).

=== College career ===
In 2015, after graduating high school, Stamboulidis enrolled at Columbia University, and played three seasons with Columbia Lions men's soccer team. In 2016, he helped Columbia win their first Ivy League title since 1993. He also trained with New York Red Bulls' under-23 team for a brief period in 2015.

Stamboulidis spent three-and-a-half-years at Columbia University, graduating from the prestigious Ivy League University with a degree in Economics and playing 40 matches for the Lions.

=== Colorado Rapids ===
In 2017, Stamboulidis joined Colorado Rapids U-23 in the Premier Development League, playing ten matches in 2017 and another four matches in the 2018 season.

=== Aris ===
On 25 July 2018, Super League Greece side Aris Thessaloniki announced the signing of Stamboulidis on a one-year contract, after Paco Herrera trialled Stamboulidis during preseason in Greece and the club's preseason tour in the Netherlands. Despite featuring for the Greek giants in preseason friendlies in the Netherlands against Den Haag and Willem II, Stamboulidis only featured twice as an unused substitute in January 2019.

=== Extremadura ===
On 8 August 2019, Stamboulidis signed a one-year deal with Spanish Segunda División side Extremadura UD, being the first Australian player of the club's history. However, he spent the campaign unregistered, being unable to feature for the first team or the reserve team.

=== Langreo ===
On 8 October 2020, after a successful trial at Cultural Leonesa, terms could not be agreed upon and Stamboulidis signed for Segunda División B side UP Langreo. He featured in a total of six matches for the side before departing.

=== Almopos Aridea ===
On 26 August 2021, Almopos Aridea announced the signing of Stamboulidis. He made his debut with the newly promoted team on 28 November, replacing Dimitris Aslabaloglou in a 2–0 away loss against Xanthi for the Super League Greece 2 championship.

=== Irodotos ===
On 21 January 2022, Stamboulidis moved to fellow-second division side Irodotos.

=== Makedonikos ===
In September 2025 Stamboulidis joined Super League Greece 2 team Makedonikos on a contract until June 2026.

== International career ==
Born in Australia, Stamboulidis is of Greek descent; he is eligible to play for both Australia and Greece.

=== Australia ===
Subsequent to a successful national championship with the Victorian State Team in 2009, Stamboulidis was selected to form the 30 man squad for the U13 Qantas Socceroos.

In 2015, Stamboulidis played for the Australia U19 Schoolboys.

During a youth game between Melbourne City FC and Melbourne Victory FC, Stamboulidis was identified by Paul Okon, the Australia U20 coach, during his scouting visit to the Melbourne Derby. Josep Gombau in his role as Australia U23 coach, also had discussions with Stamboulidis regarding him joining the Olyroos.

=== Greece ===
In March 2015, Stamboulidis was invited to take part in the Greece national under-19 team national team, following his tour with the Australia U19 Schoolboys tour in the United Kingdom in January. Late in the month, he featured in two friendlies against Ukraine U19 in Tripoli, Greece.

While preparing for the Greece national U19 team friendlies against Ukraine, Stamboulidis trained with U20 AEK and was asked to join them by Stelios Manolas. Stamboulidis however decided to accept a scholarship offered to him by Columbia University in New York City.

In June 2015, Stamboulidis noted he wanted to play for Australia.

== Style of play ==
A versatile player, he plays as either a central defender, a full-back on either side or a defensive midfielder.

== Personal life ==
Stamboulidis' younger brother George is also a footballer and student-athlete at Yale University.
