= Alexandros Karagiannis =

Greek footballer

Personal information
- Date of birth: 25 October 1993 (age 32)
- Place of birth: Grevena, Greece
- Height: 1.73 m (5 ft 8 in)
- Position: Winger

Team information
- Current team: Kozani
- Number: 88

Youth career
- 2009–2010: Pyrsos Grevena
- 2010–2012: Aris

Senior career*
| Years | Team | Apps | (Gls) |
| 2012–2014 | Aris | 10 | (1) |
| 2014–2015 | Chania | 17 | (3) |
| 2015–2018 | Lamia | 64 | (14) |
| 2018–2019 | AO Chania Kissamikos | 15 | (2) |
| 2019–2020 | Lamia | 0 | (0) |
| 2020–2021 | Veria | 24 | (2) |
| 2021– | Kozani | 43 | (5) |
- * Club domestic league appearances and goals as of 14 November 2022

Alexandros Karagiannis (Greek: Αλέξανδρος Καραγιάννης; born 25 October 1993) is a Greek professional footballer who plays as a winger for Super League 2 club Kozani.

== Career ==
=== Aris ===
He started his career in Pyrsos Grevena, In July 2010 he transferred to Aris Thessaloniki's U18 team. During the 2012–2013 season, then head coach Makis Katsavakis promoted him to the first team, though he made his debut in December 2012 in a match against Skoda Xanthi, after Lucas Alcaraz was appointed as manager.

=== Chania ===
On 25 July 2014, he signed a year contract with Chania.

=== Lamia ===
On 11 August 2015, he signed with Lamia for an undisclosed fee. In the 2016–17 season he celebrated promotion to the Super League. On 27 June 2017 he extended his contract for an additional season. On 21 January 2018 Karagiannis scored in a crucial 1–0 home win against Asteras Tripolis, the first after 3 months.

=== AO Chania Kissamikos ===
On 12 July 2018 he signed a one-year contract with Football League side AO Chania Kissamikos on a free transfer.

=== Return to Lamia ===
On 3 July 2019, he returned to Lamia on a one-year contract.

== Career statistics ==
=== Club ===
As of 6 May 2019

| Club | Season | League | | Cup | | Continental^{[A]} | | Others^{[B]} | | Total | |
| Club | Season | Apps | Goals | Apps | Goals | Apps | Goals | Apps | Goals | Apps | Goals |
|---|---|---|---|---|---|---|---|---|---|---|---|
| Aris | 2012–13 | 6 | 1 | 2 | 0 | – | – | – | – | 8 | 1 |
| Aris | 2013–14 | 4 | 0 | 1 | 0 | – | – | – | – | 5 | 0 |
| Aris | Total | 10 | 1 | 3 | 0 | 0 | 0 | 0 | 0 | 13 | 1 |
| Chania | 2014–15 | 17 | 3 | 6 | 1 | – | – | – | – | 23 | 4 |
| Chania | Total | 17 | 3 | 6 | 1 | 0 | 0 | 0 | 0 | 23 | 4 |
| Lamia | 2015–16 | 25 | 5 | 1 | 0 | – | – | – | – | 26 | 5 |
| Lamia | 2016–17 | 27 | 8 | 3 | 0 | – | – | – | – | 30 | 8 |
| Lamia | 2017–18 | 12 | 1 | 6 | 1 | – | – | – | – | 18 | 2 |
| Lamia | Total | 64 | 14 | 10 | 1 | 0 | 0 | 0 | 0 | 74 | 15 |
| Chania | 2018–19 | 15 | 2 | 3 | 0 | – | – | – | – | 18 | 2 |
| Chania | Total | 15 | 2 | 3 | 0 | 0 | 0 | 0 | 0 | 18 | 2 |
| Career total | | 106 | 20 | 22 | 2 | 0 | 0 | 0 | 0 | 128 | 22 |
