= Sokratis Dioudis =

Greek footballer

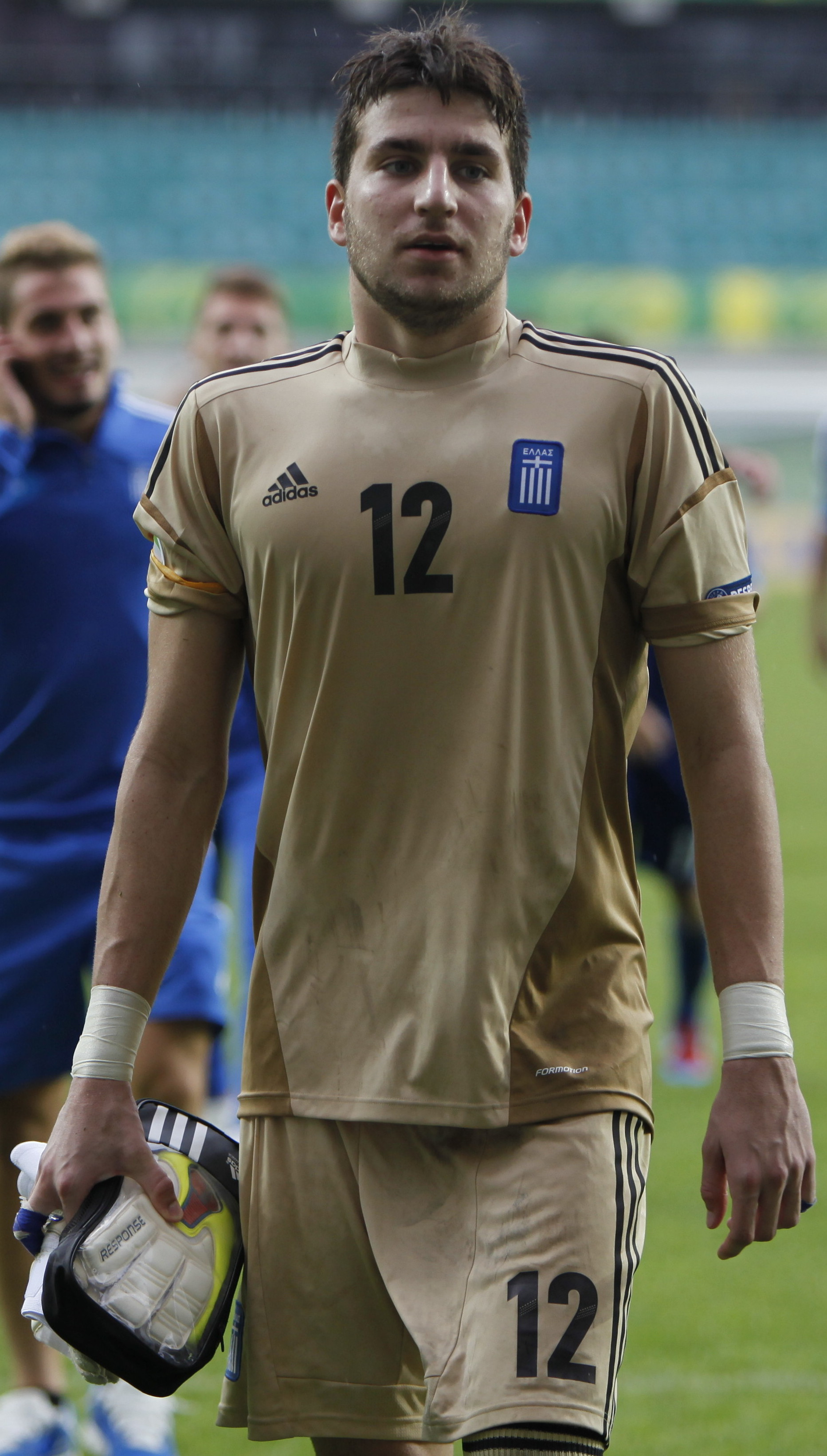
- Dioudis with Greece U19 in 2012

Personal information
- Full name: Sokratis Dioudis
- Date of birth: 3 February 1993 (age 33)
- Place of birth: Thessaloniki, Greece
- Height: 1.89 m (6 ft 2 in)
- Position: Goalkeeper

Team information
- Current team: Aris
- Number: 1

Youth career
- 2008–2011: Aris

Senior career*
Years	Team	Apps	(Gls)
2011–2014	Aris	44	(0)
2014–2016	Club Brugge	0	(0)
2015–2016	→ Panionios (loan)	21	(0)
2016–2017	Aris	31	(0)
2017–2023	Panathinaikos	108	(0)
2023–2024	Zagłębie Lubin	35	(0)
2024–2025	Gaziantep	21	(0)
2025–	Aris	12	(0)

International career^{‡}
2009–2011	Greece U17	1	(0)
2011–2012	Greece U19	8	(0)
2013	Greece U20	2	(0)
2012–2014	Greece U21	12	(0)
2020–2021	Greece	2	(0)
Medal record
Men's football
Representing Greece
UEFA European Under-19 Championship
Runner-up	2012 Estonia
- * Club domestic league appearances and goals as of 22 February 2026 ‡ National team caps and goals as of 28 March 2021

Sokratis Dioudis (Greek: Σωκράτης Διούδης; born 3 February 1993) is a Greek professional footballer who plays as a goalkeeper for Super League club Aris.

== Club career ==
=== Aris ===
Dioudis was promoted to the senior Aris Thessaloniki team in May 2011 while Sakis Tsiolis was coach. In his first professional season (2011–12), he did not play any match, being behind Michalis Sifakis and Markos Vellidis. In 2012–13 season, being the second-choice goalkeeper of Aris because of the departure with Sifakis, Dioudis started in only the second matchday, against OFI in the Kleanthis Vikelidis Stadium, because of an argue between the first goalkeeper of the squad, Markos Vellidis and the coach Makis Katsavakis. The match ended 0–0.

=== Club Brugge ===
On 22 July 2014, Dioudis made a transfer to Belgian giant Club Brugge on a two-years' contract, with an option for an additional season. He became second goalkeeper after the Australian international Mathew Ryan. Aris gets €200,000 with the transfer of their goalie.

==== Loan to Panionios ====
On 25 June 2015, following a season in which Dioudis did not play and was only the reserve goalkeeper behind Mathew Ryan, he joined Greek side Panionios on loan for the 2015–16 season, returning to the Super League Greece. On 28 November 2015, he made his debut with the club in the Super League in a 2–0 home win against PAS Giannina. On 12 December 2015, in a 1–1 home draw against AEK Athens for the Super League reached 50 appearances in his professional career in all competitions. At the end of a successful 2015–16 season, the officials of the club are more than happy with the international goalie's performances and they will do everything in their power to keep him in the club, while Greek giants Olympiacos and Panathinaikos also monitored him for the summer transfer window.

=== Return to Aris ===
On 25 March 2016, after solved his contract with Club Brugge, Dioudis returned to Aris on a 3-year contract. He stated that despite receiving offers from Olympiacos, Panathinaikos and AEK Athens he wanted to return to his "home".

On 25 July 2017, after only a year with Aris, the talented Greek goalkeeper will most likely continue his career at Panathinaikos, since the two clubs agreed terms. The Greens will pay an estimated amount of €150,000 in order to complete the purchase of 24-year-old international, who is expected to sign three-season contract with manager Marinos Ouzounidis' team and replace experienced Englishman Luke Steele.

=== Panathinaikos ===
On 8 August 2017, Panathinaikos have announced the signing of goalkeeper Sokratis Dioudis, ahead of the 2017–18 season. The 24-year-old international was the sixth player that moves to the Greens this summer. On 25 November 2017, he made his debut with the club in the Super League, in an away game against Atromitos. At the end of the 2017–18 season, many were worried with him as the first choice this season following the departure of Odysseas Vlachodimos to Benfica, but Dioudis has proved to be an outstanding replacement and credit is given to Panathinaikos' coach Georgios Donis for turning the player from last season's inconsistent displays to a keeper who commands his area well and makes extraordinary saves.

On 11 November 2018, Dioudis in a 1–1 away derby with rivals Olympiacos suffered a face injury in a strong aerial challenge from Bibras Natcho. The Israeli midfielder earned a yellow card and Panathinaikos were forced to replace the injured Dioudis with Konstantinos Kotsaris. It was a scary moment for Dioudis as he swallowed his tongue. In a touching moment of the derby, the home fans clapped for the injured Panathinaikos keeper as he was carried off in a stretcher.

On 31 January 2020, Dioudis has agreed to extend his Panathinaikos contract through to 2023. Dioudis, has conceded 21 Super League appearances in the 2019–20 season, gaining seven clean sheets along the way. At the end of the 2019–20 regular season, the 27-year-old is now considered one of the best goalkeepers in Greece. Dioudis played at the same high level throughout the entire regular season, recording an impressive total of 11 clean sheets while conceding 22 goals in 25 games. The last time when Dioudis conceded more than one goal in a match was in November 2019 as Panathinaikos defeated AEK Athens 3–2.

=== Zagłębie Lubin ===
On 27 January 2023, Dioudis signed for Ekstraklasa club Zagłębie Lubin on a contract until the end of the season.

=== Gaziantep ===
On 14 July 2024, two days after terminating his contract with Zagłębie, Dioudis joined Süper Lig club Gaziantep.

=== Return to Aris ===
On 8 September 2025, after solved his contract with Gaziantep, Dioudis returned to Aris on a 2-year contract.

== International career ==
Dioudis was member of Greece U-19. In this level, Dioudis has 9 appearances. The most important matches in his international career are the semi-final and final of 2012 UEFA European Under-19 Football Championship, against England and Spain, making very good appearances. In October 2012 he was called in the Greece's U-21 team and got 12 appearances. Two years later, in October 2014, he was called in the Greece National Football Team by Claudio Ranieri without taking any appearances yet. After a 6-year absence from the national team, on 7 October 2020, he made his first appearance in the friendly 1–2 away loss match against Austria.

== Career statistics ==
=== Club ===
As of 12 April 2026

Appearances and goals by club, season and competition
Club	Season	League			National cup (Note: Includes Greek Cup, Polish Cup, Turkish Cup)		Continental		Other		Total	
Club	Season	Division	Apps	Goals	Apps	Goals	Apps	Goals	Apps	Goals	Apps	Goals
Aris	2011–12	Super League Greece	0	0	0	0	—		—		0	0
Aris	2012–13	Super League Greece	12	0	1	0	—		—		13	0
Aris	2013–14	Super League Greece	32	0	1	0	—		—		33	0
Aris	Total		44	0	2	0	—		—		46	0
Club Brugge	2014–15	Belgian First Division A	0	0	0	0	—		—		0	0
Panionios	2015–16	Super League Greece	21	0	3	0	—		—		24	0
Aris	2016–17	Football League Greece	31	0	3	0	—		—		34	0
Panathinaikos	2017–18	Super League Greece	5	0	3	0	—		—		8	0
Panathinaikos	2018–19	Super League Greece	26	0	3	0	—		—		29	0
Panathinaikos	2019–20	Super League Greece	32	0	6	0	—		—		38	0
Panathinaikos	2020–21	Super League Greece	34	0	1	0	—		—		35	0
Panathinaikos	2021–22	Super League Greece	11	0	4	0	—		—		15	0
Panathinaikos	Total		108	0	17	0	—		—		125	0
Zagłębie Lubin	2022–23	Ekstraklasa	14	0	—		—		—		14	0
Zagłębie Lubin	2023–24	Ekstraklasa	21	0	1	0	—		—		22	0
Zagłębie Lubin	Total		35	0	1	0	—		—		36	0
Gaziantep	2024–25	Süper Lig	20	0	1	0	—		—		21	0
Gaziantep	2025–26	Süper Lig	1	0	0	0	—		—		1	0
Gaziantep	Total		22	0	1	0	—		—		23	0
Aris	2025–26	Super League Greece	12	0	0	0	—		—		12	0
Career Total			271	0	27	0	0	0	0	0	299	0

=== International ===
As of match played 28 March 2021

Appearances and goals by national team and year
National team	Year	Apps	Goals
Greece
Greece	2020	1	0
Greece	2021	1	0
Total		2	0

== Honours ==
Club Brugge

- Belgian Cup: 2014–15

Panathinaikos

- Greek Cup: 2021–22

Greece U19

- UEFA European Under-19 Championship runner-up: 2012

Individual

- UEFA European Under-19 Championship Team of the Tournament: 2012
- Super League Greece 2 Goalkeeper of the Season: 2016–17
- Super League Greece Goalkeeper of the Season: 2020–21
- Super League Greece Team of the Season: 2020–21
- Panathinaikos Player of the Season: 2020–21
