= David Aganzo =

Spanish footballer (born 1981)

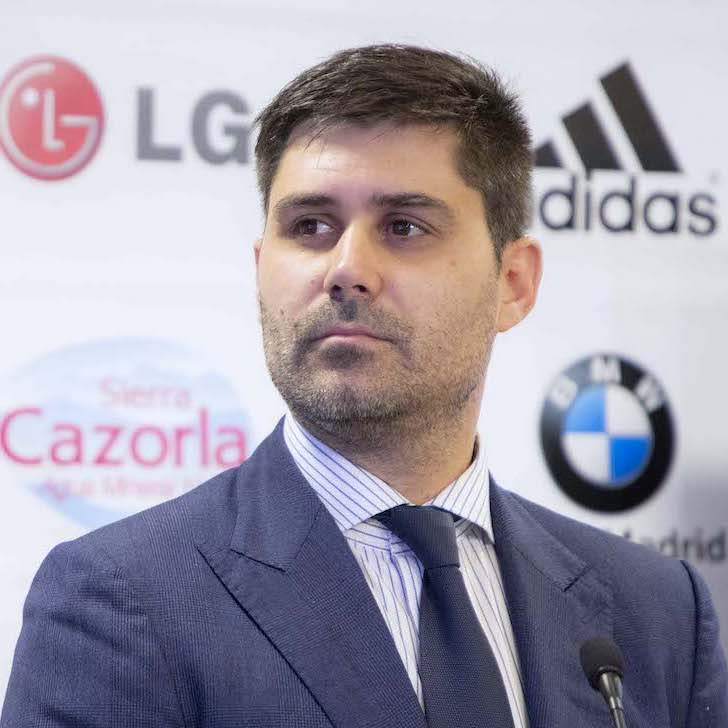
- Aganzo in 2019

Personal information
- Full name: David Aganzo Méndez
- Date of birth: 10 January 1981 (age 45)
- Place of birth: Madrid, Spain
- Height: 1.77 m (5 ft 10 in)
- Position: Striker

Youth career
- Real Madrid

Senior career*
Years	Team	Apps	(Gls)
1999–2000	Real Madrid C		
2000–2004	Real Madrid	4	(0)
2000–2001	→ Extremadura (loan)	16	(5)
2001–2002	→ Espanyol (loan)	11	(0)
2002–2003	→ Valladolid (loan)	30	(9)
2003–2004	→ Levante (loan)	33	(9)
2004–2007	Racing Santander	49	(10)
2006	→ Beitar Jerusalem (loan)	12	(3)
2007–2008	Alavés	30	(11)
2008–2011	Rayo Vallecano	72	(28)
2011–2012	Hércules	21	(2)
2012–2014	Aris	38	(12)
2014–2015	Lugo	11	(3)
Total		327	(92)

International career
1997–1998	Spain U16	11	(5)
1998–1999	Spain U17	8	(6)
1999–2000	Spain U18	7	(2)
1999–2001	Spain U20	4	(0)
2000–2003	Spain U21	13	(3)
Medal record
Representing Spain
Men's football
FIFA World Youth Championship
Winner	1999 Nigeria
- * Club domestic league appearances and goals

David Aganzo Méndez (born 10 January 1981) is a Spanish former professional footballer who played as a striker.

He amassed La Liga totals of 94 matches and 19 goals over six seasons, appearing in the competition for Real Madrid, Espanyol, Valladolid and Racing de Santander. He added 181 games and 58 goals in the Segunda División, and also played in Israel and Greece.

== Club career ==
Born in Madrid, Aganzo was a product of Real Madrid's youth system, and made his debut with the first team on 20 February 2000 in a 1–1 draw away to Valencia. Never a part of the club's plans, he went on to serve four consecutive loans: Extremadura, Espanyol, Real Valladolid and Levante; however, after appearing against Rosenborg in the 1999–2000 UEFA Champions League, he earned a winner's medal.

In the 2004–05 season, Aganzo signed for Racing de Santander in La Liga, where he was rarely used except in his first year. In January 2006, he had a small loan stint at Beitar Jerusalem.

Aganzo moved to Alavés for 2007–08, contributing eleven goals to help the Basques to narrowly avoid relegation to Segunda División. He was released at the end of the campaign, joining another side in that tier, Rayo Vallecano who had just promoted, on a free transfer. He scored a career-best 12 goals in his first year as the team easily retained their status, being regularly used over three years and leaving the Campo de Fútbol de Vallecas in July 2011.

In early September 2012, Aganzo signed with Aris Thessaloniki of the Super League Greece from Hércules, on a one-year contract. He returned to his country two years later, joining second-tier Lugo.

Aganzo retired at the age of 34. In November 2017, he replaced Luis Rubiales at the helm of the Association of Spanish Footballers.

== International career ==
Aganzo represented Spain at the 1999 FIFA World Youth Championship, playing three games as the nation won the tournament in Nigeria.

== Personal life ==
Aganzo's wife, Brazilian footballer Milene Domingues, played in Spain from 2002 to 2009 (including two years in the ladies' team of Rayo Vallecano).

== Honours ==
Real Madrid

- UEFA Champions League: 1999–2000

Levante

- Segunda División: 2003–04

Spain U20

- FIFA World Youth Championship: 1999
