= Athanasios Kanoulas =

Greek footballer

Thanasis Kanoulas
Personal information
- Full name: Athanasios Kanoulas
- Date of birth: 19 February 1992 (age 34)
- Place of birth: Thessaloniki, Greece
- Height: 1.89 m (6 ft 2 1/2 in)
- Position: Forward

Team information
- Current team: Poseidon Nea Michaniona

Senior career*
Years	Team	Apps	(Gls)
2008–2011	Anagennisi Epanomi	19	(6)
2011–2012	Aris	11	(1)
2013–2014	OFI	5	(0)
2014–2015	Kavala	26	(13)
2015	Apollon Kalamarias	12	(4)
2016–2017	Panserraikos	23	(3)
2017	Makedonikos	0	(0)
2018	Apollon Larissa	20	(7)
2018–2020	Veria	43	(21)
2020–2021	Santorini	16	(6)
2021	Apollon Larissa	6	(1)
2022	Pierikos	18	(7)
2022–2024	Kozani	46	(21)
2024	Nea Artaki		
2025	Apollon Paralimnio		
2025–2026	Thermaikos		
2026–	Poseidon Nea Michaniona		
- * Club domestic league appearances and goals as of 31 December 2025

Athanasios 'Thanasis' Kanoulas (Greek: Αθανάσιος 'Θανάσης' Κανούλας; born 19 February 1992) is a Greek professional footballer who plays as a forward for Gamma Ethniki club Poseidon Nea Michaniona.

== Career ==
Kanoulas started his career in Anagennisi Epanomi, for which he made 19 league appearances and scored 6 goals. On 16 June 2011, he signed for Superleague side Aris. He made his professional debut against Doxa Dramas.

== Honours ==
Veria

- Gamma Ethniki: 2018–19
- Imathia Cup: 2018–19

Kozani

- Gamma Ethniki: 2022–23
- Kozani Cup: 2022–23
