= Giannis Gesios =

Greek footballer

Personal information
- Full name: Ioannis Gesios
- Date of birth: 3 August 1988 (age 38)
- Place of birth: Edessa, Greece
- Height: 1.83 m (6 ft 0 in)
- Position: Striker

Team information
- Current team: Almopos Aridea
- Number: 23

Youth career
- 2006–2007: Aris

Senior career*
Years	Team	Apps	(Gls)
2005–2006	Edessaikos	22	(18)
2007–2008	Aris	0	(0)
2008–2009	→ P.A.O.N.E.	25	(8)
2009–2010	→ Rodos	5	(0)
2010	→ Veria (loan)	10	(5)
2010–2011	Rodos	3	(0)
2011–2012	Anagennisi Epanomi	35	(12)
2012–2013	Aris	8	(1)
2013	Kerkyra	12	(3)
2013	Olympiacos Volos	4	(0)
2014–2015	Aiginiakos	24	(5)
2015–2016	Chania	25	(7)
2016–2017	Agrotikos Asteras	30	(7)
2017	Panachaiki	1	(0)
2018	Ethnikos Piraeus	0	(0)
2018–2020	Thyella Sarakinoi		
2020–	Almopos Aridea		

International career
2005–2006	Greece U19	5	(0)
- * Club domestic league appearances and goals as of 12 December 2017

Giannis Gesios (Greek: Γιάννης Γκέσιος; born 3 August 1988) is a Greek professional footballer who plays as a striker.

== Club career ==
Gesios started his career in Edessaikos during 2005 before being transferred to Aris Thessaloniki and his participation in Greece's U-19 team, however he was released in 2008 signing to P.A.O.N.E. where he helped the team to reach Greece's second division in 2009, afterwards he spend two years to Rodos, during which he was loaned to Veria for six months. In 2011-2012 he played for Anagennisi Epanomi scoring 12 goals, before returning to Aris Thessaloniki in the summer of 2012.
