= Stelios Tsoukanis =

Greek footballer

Personal information
- Full name: Stylianos Tsoukanis
- Date of birth: 27 February 1990 (age 36)
- Place of birth: Thessaloniki, Greece
- Height: 1.81 m (5 ft 11 1/2 in)
- Position: Left-back

Team information
- Current team: Makedonikos
- Number: 23

Senior career*
Years	Team	Apps	(Gls)
–2011	Anagennisi Epanomi	0	(0)
2011–2014	Aris	14	(0)
2014–2015	Niki Volos	9	(0)
2015	OFI	0	(0)
2015–2016	Kissamikos	2	(0)
2016	Apollon Pontus	0	(0)
2016–2017	Chania	31	(3)
2017–	Makedonikos	106	(9)
- * Club domestic league appearances and goals as of 26 April 2026

Stelios Tsoukanis (Greek: Στέλιος Τσουκάνης, born 27 February 1990) is a Greek professional footballer who plays as a left-back for Super League 2 club Makedonikos.

== Career ==
Tsoukanis started his career in youth teams of Anagennisi Epanomi, and in summer 2011, after a trial, he joined Aris after a recommendation of then-coach Sakis Tsiolis. He played 6 matches in his first season to Aris, due to an injury of first-choice left back Michel Garbini Pereira. He played very good and earned congratulations, despite some mistakes that he made due to inexperience.
