= Michalis Giannitsis =

Greek footballer

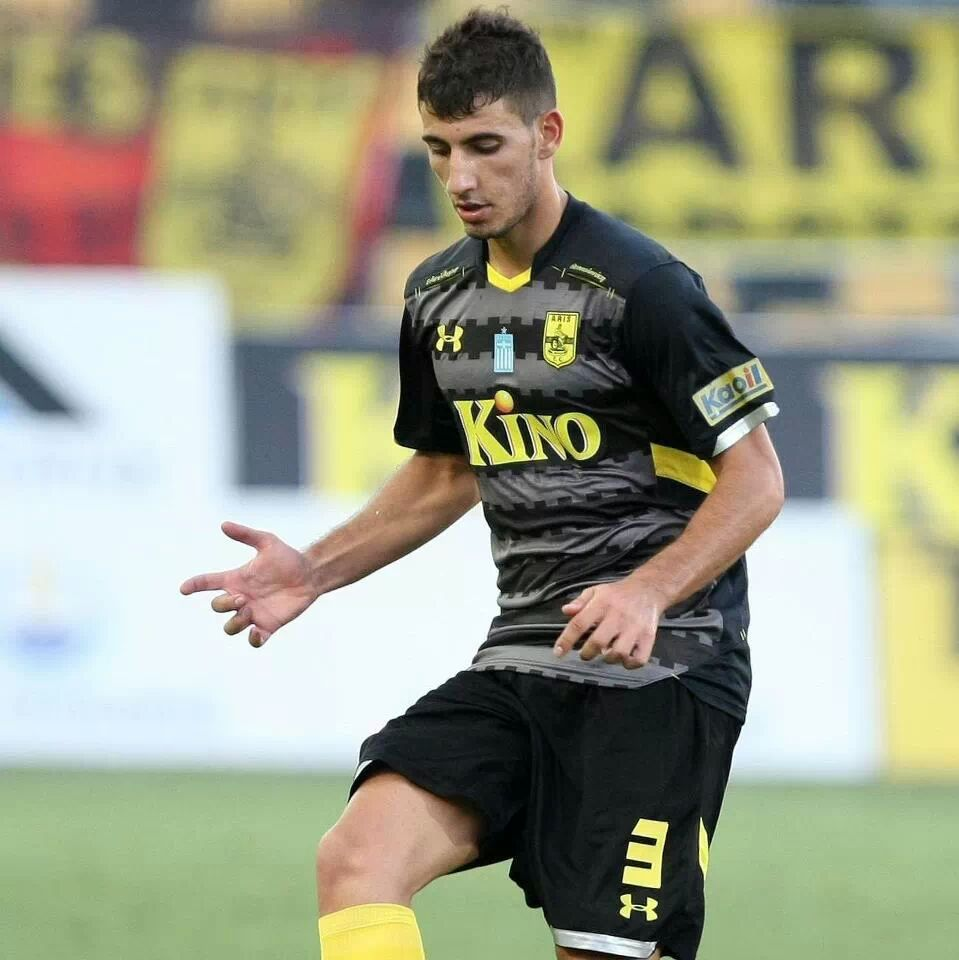
- Giannitsis playing for Aris in 2014

Personal information
- Full name: Michail Giannitsis
- Date of birth: 6 February 1992 (age 34)
- Place of birth: Thessaloniki, Greece
- Height: 1.89 m (6 ft 2 1/2 in)
- Position: Defender

Team information
- Current team: Foinikas Polichni

Youth career
- 2009–2012: Aris

Senior career*
Years	Team	Apps	(Gls)
2012–2015	Aris	29	(1)
2015	Kallithea	21	(2)
2015–2016	Kissamikos	28	(1)
2016–2017	Sparta	30	(1)
2017	Trikala	4	(0)
2018–2019	Iraklis	14	(0)
2019–2020	Trikala	20	(0)
2020–2021	Olympiacos Volos	15	(2)
2021–2023	Apollon Larissa	36	(3)
2023	Iraklis Larissa	13	(0)
2023–2024	Ethnikos Neo Keramidi	16	(0)
2024	Niki Volos	10	(0)
2024–2025	Olympiacos Volos	25	(2)
2025–	Foinikas Polichni	0	(0)
- * Club domestic league appearances and goals as of 10 June 2023

Michalis Giannitsis (Greek: Μιχάλης Γιαννίτσης; born 6 February 1992) is a Greek professional footballer who plays as a defender.

== Career ==
=== Aris ===
He started his career in youth teams of Aris. In 2011, head coach Sakis Tsiolis promoted him to the first team, and he made his professional debut on 26 August 2012, in a Supeleague game against Panionios.

=== Trikala ===
On 12 July 2017, he joined Trikala of the Football League.

=== Iraklis ===
On 2 January 2018, Iraklis officially announced the signing of Giannitsis on a free transfer. At the end of the season he celebrated promotion to the Football League.
