= Association of Spanish Footballers =

AFE
- Spanish Footballers' Association
- Asociación de Futbolistas Españoles
- Founded: 23 January 1978
- Headquarters: Madrid, Spain
- Location: Spain
- President: David Aganzo
- Affiliations: FIFPro
- Website: www.afe-futbol.com

The Spanish Footballers' Association (Spanish: Asociación de Futbolistas Españoles, AFE) is the association for professional footballers in Spain. Currently its president is David Aganzo.
