= Khalifa Sankaré =

Senegalese footballer

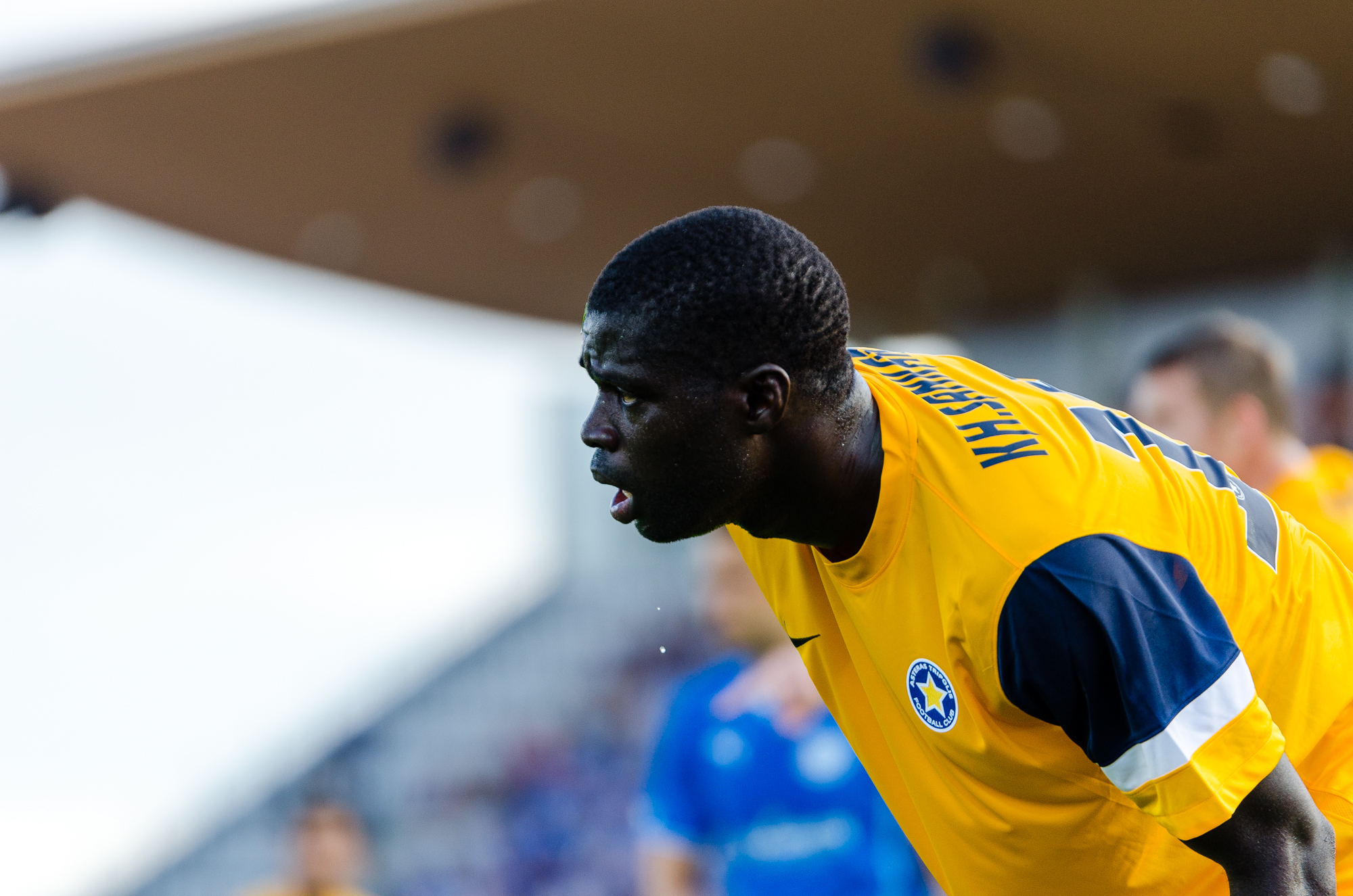
- Sankaré with Asteras Tripolis in 2014

Personal information
- Full name: Papa Khalifa Sankaré
- Date of birth: 15 August 1984 (age 42)
- Place of birth: Dakar, Senegal
- Height: 1.90 m (6 ft 3 in)
- Position: Centre back

Youth career
- 2001–2003: AS Douanes
- 2003–2005: Boulogne

Senior career*
Years	Team	Apps	(Gls)
2005–2007	Boulogne	32	(2)
2007–2010	Zulte Waregem	9	(2)
2008–2009	→ Oostende (loan)	29	(7)
2009–2010	→ Mons (loan)	39	(3)
2010–2011	Olympiacos Volos	30	(3)
2011–2012	Aris	23	(1)
2012–2016	Asteras Tripolis	95	(9)
2013	→ Al-Arabi (loan)	2	(0)
2016–2018	Cádiz	34	(3)
- * Club domestic league appearances and goals as of 18 June 2017

Papa Khalifa Sankaré (born 15 August 1984) is a Senegalese former professional footballer who plays as a central defender.

== Club career ==
=== Early career ===
Sankaré was born in Dakar, Senegal. He started his football career at AS Douanes but moved to French team US Boulogne in 2003, and appeared with the latter's first team during the 2005–06 and 2006–07 seasons. In July 2007 he was transferred to Belgian club S.V. Zulte Waregem, but spent the majority of his spell on loan at K.V. Oostende and R.A.E.C. Mons.

=== Greece ===
In July 2010, Sankaré transferred to Greek team Olympiacos Volos. He made his debut for the club on 28 August, starting in a 1–0 away win against Panionios, and subsequently established himself as a regular starter at the club.

In the 2011 summer, after Olympiacos' relegation due to a match-fixing scandal, Sankaré was released by the club and joined Aris in the same division. He scored his first goal for Aris on his debut, netting the first in a 1–1 draw at Ergotelis.

Sankaré joined Super League side Asteras Tripolis from Aris on a free transfer in July 2012. He reached fan acclaim by scoring a stunning bicycle kick in the play-off match against PAS Giannina on 15 May 2013.

=== Kuwait / Asteras Tripolis return ===
In May 2013, Sankaré joined Kuwaitian club Al-Arabi. In January of the following year, after being rarely used, he returned to his former club Asteras Tripolis, becoming an immediate first-choice.

Sankaré was also an undisputed starter for Asteras during the 2014–15 UEFA Europa League run, which saw the club reach the group stage for the first time in their history. He also scored a goal in a 1–1 away draw against Finnish club RoPS on 17 July 2014.

=== Cádiz ===
On 13 August 2016, Sankaré signed a one-year contract with Spanish Segunda División club Cádiz CF.

== Honours ==
=== Club ===
Asteras Tripoli

- Greek Cup runner-up: 2012–13
