= Makedonikos F.C. =

Men's association football team in Greece

Makedonikos
- Full name: Makedonikos Football Club
- Nickname: Πράσινοι (Greens)
- Founded: 1928; 98 years ago
- Ground: Makedonikos Stadium
- Capacity: 7,500
- Owner: Pavlos Andronis
- Chairman: Marianna Konstantinidou
- Manager: Andreas Pantziaras
- League: Gamma Ethniki
- 2025–26: Super League Greece 2 (North Group), 10th (relegated)
- Website: www.makedonikos.gr
Home colours	Away colours

Makedonikos Football Club (Greek: Μακεδονικός) is a Greek professional football club based in Efkarpia and most of its fans come from this area, though the club is famous in all westside areas of Thessaloniki.

== History ==
The association was founded in 1928, and the name means 'Macedonian'. At the time of its formation, the club's original name was Prosfygiki Enosis (Refugees Union - the founders were Greek refugees who came from Turkey after the 1922 war disaster) but they were forced to change it in 1936 after the Metaxas government suggestion. The team's name inspired many regional teams. As a result, there are more than twenty Macedonian teams who also use it (Olympiacos and PAOK are also common names for Greek football clubs).

The club's best moments were in the 1940s when the team was struggling for the Greek Championship (1947) but didn't make it and in the 1980s when Makedonikos took part in the Super League (1st Division Championship) (1982–83) and was relegated after a play-out match against Panionios (3–2 final score). Makedonikos still stands out as the only Greek team who managed not to be beaten by Olympiacos (0–0 in Efkarpia and 1–1 in Karaiskakis Stadium). They also managed not to lose a game in Efkarpia against PAOK (0–0), Aris (1–0), Iraklis (1–0), AEK Athens (1–0), Panathinaikos (3–0), the most famous clubs of the Greek League. They also made it to the 1980 Greek Cup semi-final, where they were eliminated by Kastoria F.C., who finally won the Cup. Makedonikos F.C. was also one of the strongest clubs in the 2nd Division from the late 1970s to the early 1990s. In 2008, they ascended to the national league after fourteen years of absence with Marcelo Zuleta as technical director. In 2016, the club won the EPSM Cup by winning 2–1 in the final at Toumba Stadium and were also champions of the EPSM A1 Division, having lost only twice. In the play-off match against Apollon Paralimnio (which was crucial for both teams' promotion), chairman Pavlos Andronis withdrew the team due to bad arbitration, so the team lost their chance to be promoted. However, during the 2016–17 season, Makedonikos finished on top of the league and was promoted to the Third National Division (Gamma Ethniki), having won the play-off match against Olympiacos Kimina (3–1).

The club remained steadily in Gamma Ethniki for 5 seasons. In the 2021–2022 season, although Makedonikos finished second on the pitch, they filed an appeal following their final match against A.E. Lefkimmi regarding the illegal participation of a player from the Corfu team. This development directly affected their title rival, Kozani. Following intense legal disputes that reached the Court of Arbitration for Sport (CAS), the Hellenic Football Federation eventually cleared Makedonikos to participate in the promotion play-offs. The club finished in 4th place, securing promotion to the second division after 31 years.

In the 2025–26 season, Makedonikos finished in last place in the Northern Group and was relegated to Gamma Ethniki, after 4 years in Super League 2.

== Crest and colours ==
The official club colours of Makedonikos are green and white.

The club's crest features a vertical split-shield design framed by a silver border. The left side is black and displays a stylized depiction of the White Tower of Thessaloniki, representing the club's regional origins. The right side is green and features the Vergina Sun, symbolising the region of Macedonia. The club's name is displayed along the top arc, while its founding year, 1928, is centered at the bottom.

== Stadium ==
The home ground of Makedonikos is its Makedonikos Stadium in Nea Efkarpia, which has a capacity of 7,500. It was built in 1968 and officially opened on 25 March 1969.

== Players ==
=== Current squad ===
As of 14 April 2026

Note: Flags indicate national team as defined under FIFA eligibility rules; some limited exceptions apply. Players may hold more than one non-FIFA nationality.

No.	Pos.	Nation	Player
1	GK	GRE	Stefanos Gounaridis
2	DF	ESP	Dani Morer
3	DF	ALB	Denis Thomaj
4	DF	AUS	Haris Stamboulidis
5	DF	GRE	Spyros Saragiotis
7	MF	GRE	Georgios Kalaitzis
8	MF	GRE	Thomas Karaberis
11	FW	GRE	Nikolaos Nikos
13	FW	GRE	Anastasios Konstantinidis
14	MF	NGR	Tobi Adeleke
17	MF	CAN	Noah Verhoeven

No.	Pos.	Nation	Player
19	MF	HAI	Mikaël Cantave
21	DF	GRE	Nikos Karastergios
23	DF	GRE	Stelios Tsoukanis (captain)
28	GK	GRE	Angelos Syritoudis
30	MF	GRE	Anastasios Amanatidis (on loan from AEK Athens U19)
31	MF	NGR	Lawal Sulaimon
32	DF	GRE	Stergios Paraskevas
34	FW	GRE	Georgios Kotsoglou
45	DF	GRE	Nikolas Kotelis
88	GK	GRE	Stelios Kazelis

=== Out on loan ===
Note: Flags indicate national team as defined under FIFA eligibility rules; some limited exceptions apply. Players may hold more than one non-FIFA nationality.

No.	Pos.	Nation	Player
—	MF	GRE	Vasilios Savvidis (at Apollon Krya Vrysi until 30 June 2026)

=== Records and statistics ===
Information correct as of the match played on 4 May 2025. Bold denotes an active player for the club.
The tables refer to Makedonikos'players in Second Division Greece, Greek Football Cup and Third Division Greece.

==== Top 5 Most Capped Players ====
Rank	Player	Years	App
1	(Greece) Stelios Tsoukanis	2017–2025	88
2	(Greece) Konstantinos Panagiotoudis	2022–2025	84
3	(Greece) Spyros Saragiotis	2021–2025	77
4	(Greece) Thanasis Leonidopoulos	2022–2025	72
5	(Albania) Alberto Simoni	2022–2024, 2024–2025	68

==== Top 5 Goalscorers ====
Rank	Player	Years	Goals
1	(Albania) Alberto Simoni	2022–2024, 2024–2025	22
2	(Greece) Alexandros Zafirakis (Greece) Stelios Tsoukanis	2022–2025; 2017–2025	9
3	(Greece) Petros Giakoumakis	2024–2025	7
4	(Greece) Michalis Kouiroukidis (Colombia) Santiago Montoya	2024–2025; 2023–2025	5
5	(Greece) Michalis Klokidis	2008–2009	4

== Honours ==
Historic crest

- Second Division: 1
  - 1981–82
- Third Division: 2
  - 1987–88, 2021–22
- Fourth Division: 1
  - 2007–08
- Greek FCA Winners' Championship: 1
  - 1976–77

Regional

- Macedonia FCA Championship: 9
  - 1946–47, 1960–61, 1961–62, 1976–76, 1976–77, 1997–98, 2001–02, 2015–16, 2016–17
- Macedonia FCA Cup: 1
  - 2015–16
