= Kostas Kapetanos =

Greek footballer

Personal information
- Full name: Kostas Kapetanos
- Date of birth: 27 October 1984 (age 42)
- Place of birth: Ptolemaida, Greece
- Height: 1.76 m (5 ft 9 1/2 in)
- Positions: Midfielder; winger

Youth career
- 2000-2003: Kozani

Senior career*
Years	Team	Apps	(Gls)
2003–2007	Iraklis	61	(5)
2007–2008	Panionios	19	(1)
2008–2009	Kerkyra	14	(2)
2009–2010	Panthrakikos	7	(0)
2010–2011	Olympiacos Volos	23	(3)
2011–2013	Aris	34	(1)
2013–2014	Olympiacos Volos	42	(8)
2014–2015	Apollon Kalamarias	16	(1)
2015–2016	A.E. Karaiskakis	14	(2)
2016	Kozani	10	(2)
2016–2017	Naoussa	22	(2)
2017–2018	Elpis Skoutari	20	(2)
- * Club domestic league appearances and goals as of 5 August 2018

Kostas Kapetanos (Greek: Κώστας Καπετάνος; born 27 October 1984) is a Greek former footballer who played as an attacking midfielder.

== Career ==
Kapetanos began his senior career at Iraklis In Thessaloniki, he made 61 league appearances, scoring 5 goals. He played for Iraklis from 2003 to 2007. In 2007–2008 season, Kapetanos played for Panionios, with giving 19 performances scoring 1 goal. Then, he transferred to Kerkyra, and there made 14 appearances and scored 2 goals. After that, went to Panthrakikos, playing in 7 matches. 2010-2011 was his best season, giving 23 performances for Olympiacos Volos and scored 3 fine goals. He prized with a joining to Aris

After several hardships that put him out of the team, he managed to be back and on 28 December, scored a goal against Doxa Drama.

On 24 January 2013, he returned to Olympiacos Volos. He played for a year and then he joined Apollon Kalamarias playing in Football League.

== Personal life ==
He is the younger brother of Pantelis Kapetanos.
