= Javier Umbides =

Argentine footballer

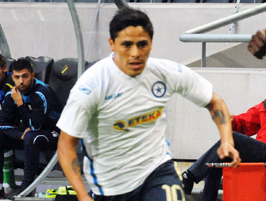

Personal information
- Full name: Javier Horacio Umbides
- Date of birth: 9 February 1982 (age 44)
- Place of birth: Santiago del Estero, Argentina
- Height: 1.73 m (5 ft 8 in)
- Positions: Winger; attacking midfielder

Senior career*
Years	Team	Apps	(Gls)
2003–2007	Estudiantes de Buenos Aires	22	(1)
2004–2005	→ Defensores de Belgrano (loan)	11	(0)
2007–2008	Defensa y Justicia	34	(4)
2008–2009	All Boys	36	(5)
2009–2011	Olympiacos Volos	49	(11)
2011–2012	Aris	25	(3)
2012–2013	Orduspor	31	(2)
2013–2021	Atromitos	228	(29)
- * Club domestic league appearances and goals as of 15 May 2021

Javier Horacio Umbides (born 9 February 1982) is an Argentine former professional footballer who mostly played as an attacking midfielder.

== Career ==
Born in Monte Quemado, Santiago del Estero, Umbides began playing professional football for All Boys from 1999 to 2000. He then moved to Argentinos Juniors where he played only one season until moving to Estudiantes (BA). After two years at Estudiantes (BA), he moved on loan to Defensores de Belgrano where he played for 11 matches in Primera B Nacional without scoring a goal. He returned to Estudiantes (BA) for two more seasons until moving to Defensa y Justicia for 2007-08 year. On 2008 he returned to All Boys after eight years.

=== Greece ===
In 2009, the 27-year-old moved to Greece to sign with Olympiacos Volos where he played 49 matches, scoring 11 goals. In September 2011 he moved to Aris FC on a free transfer, because a scandal which burst out in Greek football and punished Olympiacos Volos and Kavala by relegation to semi-professional League Delta Ethniki. Umbides played his first match for Aris F.C. at 2 October 2011, against Skoda Xanthi at home, 3 days after his sign.

After providing several assists and also being the man of the matchday 12, Umbides scored his first goal with Aris shirt on 28 December in the home-win against Doxa Drama. He scored the second one with yellow jersey against Skoda Xanthi, in a 0–2 win for Aris. He already was the leader of the team and fans love him.

In 2012, he moved to Orduspor. He scored his first goal against Kastamonuspor in a Turkish Cup match. He also scored a wonderful goal against Gençlerbirliği S.K. in a 2–1 home win.

After the end of the season, moved back to Greece to sign for Atromitos, on 26 June 2013. Atromitos midfielder was on the radar of several Greek clubs according to reports in the Greek press. The Argentine midfielder impresses for the 2014-15 season with his displays and according to rumours a club from Salonika, seemingly PAOK or Iraklis, has expressed an interest in signing him. On 16 May 2017, Atromitos announced the extension of his contract until the summer of 2018, and it was extended for a further year in May 2018. At the age of 37, Umbides renewed his contract at Atromitos till the summer of 2020, which would be his seventh season in the Peristeri team. On 25 July 2019, he scored his second goal in UEFA competitions, as he opened the scoring after 21 minutes with a tremendous half volley effort, helping his club towards the third qualifying round of the Europa League after beating Dunajská Streda 2–1 in Slovakia.

On 15 May 2021, he officially announced his retirement from professional football, and with a penalty kick was the only scorer in a 1–0 home win game against Volos The Argentinian made a change shortly before the end of the match with standing ovation and applause from those present on the field and with him not holding back his tears.

== Career statistics in Europe ==
=== Club ===
As of 15 May 2021.

Club	Season	League			Cup		Europe		Total	
Club	Season	Division	Apps	Goals	Apps	Goals	Apps	Goals	Apps	Goals
Olympiacos Volos	2009–10	Beta Ethniki	25	5	3	2	-	-	28	7
Olympiacos Volos	2010–11	Super League Greece	24	6	4	0	1	0	29	6
Aris	2011–12	Super League Greece	25	3	2	0	-	-	27	3
Orduspor	2012–13	Süper Lig	31	2	2	1	-	-	33	3
Atromitos	2013–14	Super League Greece	39	8	5	0	2	0	46	8
Atromitos	2014–15	Super League Greece	36	7	3	0	0	0	39	7
Atromitos	2015–16	Super League Greece	25	2	7	0	4	1	36	3
Atromitos	2016–17	Super League Greece	27	5	7	0	0	0	34	5
Atromitos	2017–18	Super League Greece	27	1	7	0	0	0	34	1
Atromitos	2018–19	Super League Greece	23	0	5	1	1	0	29	1
Atromitos	2019–20	Super League Greece	25	2	3	0	4	1	32	3
Atromitos	2020–21	Super League Greece	26	1	2	0	0	0	28	1
Atromitos	Total		228	26	39	1	11	2	278	29
Career total			333	42	50	4	12	2	395	48

== Honours ==
=== Individual ===
- Super League Greece Top assist provider: 2013–14
- Super League Greece Team of the Season: 2013–14
