= Makis Katsavakis =

Greek footballer and manager (born in 1953)

Personal information
- Full name: Thomas Katsavakis
- Date of birth: 26 December 1953 (age 72)
- Place of birth: Peponia, Serres, Greece
- Position: Defender

Senior career*
Years	Team	Apps	(Gls)
1969–1977	Panserraikos	144	
1977–1981	Olympiacos	59	(2)
1981–1982	Korinthos	22	(1)

Managerial career
- 1987–1989: Niki Volos
- 1992–1993: Edessaikos
- 1996–1997: Veria
- 1999–2000: Panionios
- 2004–2005: Levadiakos
- 2005–2006: Veria
- 2007–2008: Apollon Kalamarias
- 2008: AEK Larnaca
- 2008–2009: Iraklis
- 2009: Pierikos
- 2011: Olympiacos Volos
- 2011–2012: Doxa Drama
- 2012: Aris
- 2013–2014: Ethnikos Gazoros
- 2015: Panserraikos
- 2017–2018: Kilkisiakos
- 2018–2019: Alexandros Kilkis
- 2019–2021: Agrotikos Asteras
- 2021: Doxa Drama
- * Club domestic league appearances and goals

Makis Katsavakis (Greek: Μάκης Κατσαβάκης; born 26 December 1953) is a Greek professional football manager and former player.

== Playing career ==
Born in Peponia, Serres, Katsavakis began playing football as a defender for local Alpha Ethniki side Panserraikos In 1977 he Olympiacos in 1977. He finished his career with Korinthos in 1982.

== Managerial career ==
After he retired from playing, Katsavakis became a football coach. He was appointed manager by Edessaikos in 1992. He managed several Greek clubs over the following years, including Veria, PAS Giannina, Panionios, Paniliakos, Olympiacos Volos, Panserraikos, Aris, Levadiakos, Apollon Kalamarias, Iraklis and Doxa Drama. He also managed Cypriot side AEK Larnaca.
