= Stergios =

Stergios is a given name. Notable people with the given name include:

- Stergios Bilas (born 2001), Greek swimmer
- Stergios Boussios, Greek oncologist, researcher, and academic doctor
- Stergios Daoutis, Greek military leader of the Macedonian Struggle and the Balkan Wars
- Stergios Dimopoulos (born 1990), Greek footballer
- Stergios Felegakis (born 1986), Greek football player
- Stergios Goutas, Greek chieftain of the Macedonian Struggle
- Stergios Logothetidis (born 1953), Greek physicist
- Stergios Misios, Greek headman in the Macedonian Struggle
- Stergios Papachristos (born 1989), Greek rower
- Stergios Paraskevas (born 2001), Greek footballer
- Stergios Pappos (born 1972), Greek snowboarder
- Stergios Psianos (born 1989), Greek footballer
- Stergios Roumeliotis, American electrical engineer
- Stergios Tsimikas (born 1994), Greek footballer
- Stergios Tsoukas (born 1936), Greek weightlifter
- Stergios Vlachveis, Greek chieftain of the Macedonian Struggle
