= Stergios Boussios =

Greek oncologist, researcher and academic

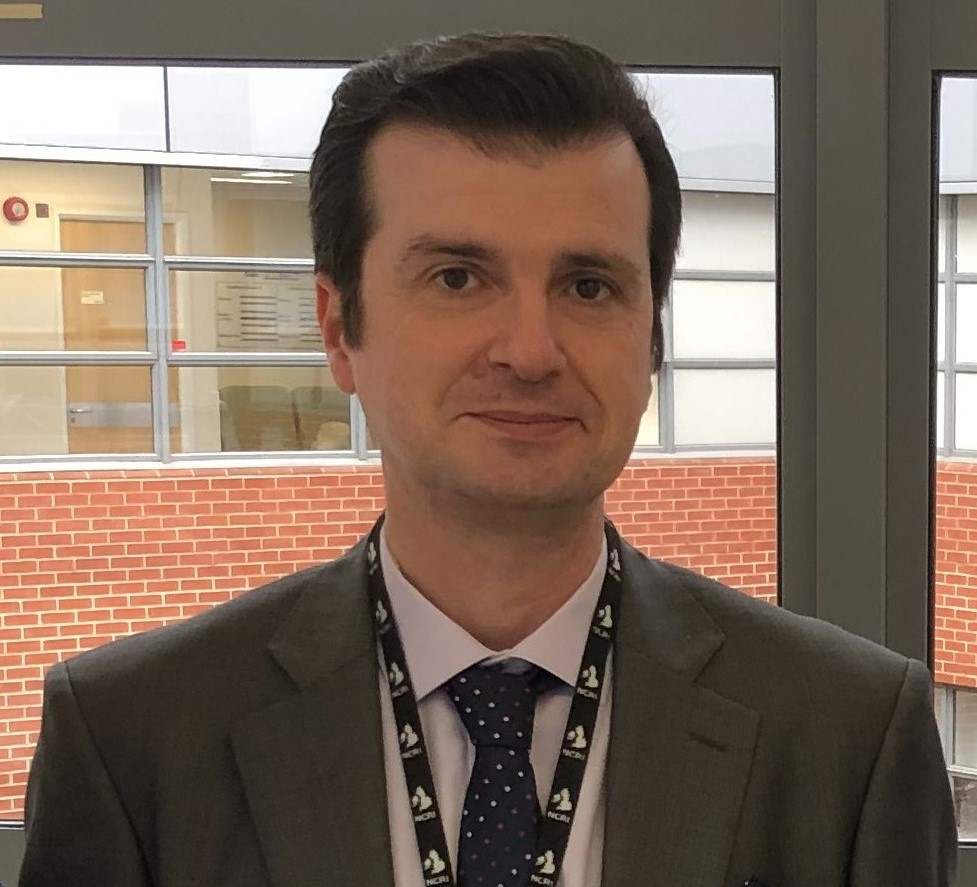
- Occupations: Oncologist, researcher, academic
- Employer: University of Ioannina
- Known for: Research on gynecological cancers and cancer of unknown primary
- Title: Associate Professor, Head of Medical Oncology

Stergios Boussios is a Greek oncologist, researcher and academic doctor specializing in gynaecological and urological cancers, and cancer of unknown primary.

He has served as a Consultant Medical Oncologist at Medway NHS Foundation Trust. In 2025, He joined the Medical School faculty at the University of Ioannina, as an Associate Professor and became Head of the Department of Medical Oncology at the affiliated University Hospital.

== Early life and career ==
Boussios specialized in Medical Oncology at the Oncology Department of Ioannina University Hospital, Greece from 2010 to 2013. Boussios was awarded fellowships from the European School of Oncology and the Hellenic Society of Medical Oncology (HeSMO) for clinical and laboratory research at the Royal Marsden Hospital from 2014 to 2015. In 2016, he defended his PhD thesis at the University of Ioannina. His research focused on the role of circulating cancer cells and cancer cells with a blastic phenotype and epithelial-mesenchymal transition in the peripheral blood of patients with CUP. In 2017, Boussios was selected by the European Society for Medical Oncology (ESMO) Fellowship and Award Committee to participate in the ESMO Leaders Generation Programme.

At Medway NHS Foundation Trust, he held the position of Clinical Director of the Department of Research & Innovation. Boussios holds teaching roles at different institutions, including School of Cancer and Pharmaceutical Sciences at King's College London, Kent and Medway Medical School at the University of Kent, School of Medicine, Health and Social Care at Canterbury Christ Church University, and Ioannina Medical School. Boussios has co-authored 140 peer-reviewed papers in leading scientific journals, achieving a Scopus H-index of 42 with approximately 4,000 citations.

== Research contributions ==
Boussios is involved in clinical trials and translational research. His current research interests focus on the individualization of patient treatment and targeted therapies in gynecological cancers, including rare malignancies. Boussios is the Principal Investigator for several international clinical trials, including LITESPARK-005, STAMPEDE, and STAR.

He has collaborated internationally with Professor V.V. Sumbayev on the intracellular and extracellular activities of V-domain Ig-containing suppressor of T cell activation, modulated by immunosuppressive factors within the tumor microenvironment.

Additionally, he has worked with Professor Saak Ovsepian on an orthogonal approach for analyzing underivatized steroid hormones using ultrahigh-performance supercritical fluid chromatography-mass spectrometry.

Boussios has conducted research on exosomal liquid biopsies in prostate and kidney cancers in collaboration with the University of Greenwich.

== Awards and recognitions ==
- 2025: Honorary attachment as a Professor Medical Oncologist and Medical Director for Research & Innovation at Medway NHS Foundation Trust, Kent
- 2023: Designated as a Visiting Professor within the Faculty of Medicine, Health and Social Care at Canterbury Christ Church University, UK, following a decision by the university's Professorship Committee
- 2020: Appointed as a Senior Lecturer in the Centre for Education, Faculty of Life Sciences and Medicine, at King's College London, London, UK, by the Faculty of Life Sciences and Medicine Management Group
- 2021–Present: Fellow of the Royal College of Physicians of London (FRCP)
- 2017: Selected by the ESMO Fellowship & Awards Committee, based on the CV's strength, to participate in the ESMO Leaders Generation Programme 2017
- 2016: Awarded Second Prize for the oral presentation titled "Research on Circulating Cancer Cells and Cancer Cells with Blastic Phenotype and Epithelial-Mesenchymal Transition in Peripheral Blood of Patients with Carcinomas of Unknown Primary Site" at the 3rd Annual Greek Conference of Clinical Oncology (21–23 April 2016, Ioannina, Greece)
- 2015: Research Fellowship awarded by the HeSMO at the Royal Marsden Hospital, London, UK
- 2014–2015: Research Fellowship awarded by the European School of Oncology at the Royal Marsden Hospital, London, UK
