= Virtual Reality in the Schools =

VR in the Schools is a peer-reviewed journal of the Virtual Reality and Education Laboratory (VREL), published by East Carolina University. VR in the Schools addresses issues of incorporating virtual reality into the education system. The journal started out as a printed quarterly but changed to an online-only publishing format starting with volume 3 and was described by its editors in 2011 as an occasional publication.

VR in the Schools is available free of charge. The current co-editors are Dr. Veronica S. Pantelidis and Mr. David C. Vinciguerra.

== Staff ==
- Dr. Veronica Pantelidis - Co-Editor
- Mr. David C. Vinciguerra - Co-Editor
- Dr. Lawrence Auld - Co-Editor emeritus
- Dr. Tassos Mikropoulos - editorial advisor, Department of Primary Education, University of Ioannina, Ioannina, Greece
- Dr. Melissa M. Selverian - editorial advisor, Temple University, Philadelphia, Pennsylvania, USA
- Ms. Debra S. Pylypiw - editorial advisor, Art Educator, White Oak High School, Jacksonville, North Carolina, USA
