= Virtual Reality and Education Laboratory =

Virtual reality organization

The Virtual Reality and Education Laboratory (VREL) at East Carolina University is dedicated to finding ways to use virtual reality in education. Recognizing the need for a laboratory to study the implications of virtual reality on K-12 education, Larry Auld and Veronica S. Pantelidis established the Virtual Reality and Education Laboratory at East Carolina University in 1992. The current co-directors are Veronica S. Pantelidis and David C. Vinciguerra.

== People ==
Dr. Veronica Pantelidis – Professor/Co-director VREL
Mr. David C. Vinciguerra – VR Instructor/Co-director VREL/Department Instructional Technology Consultant
Dr. Lawrence Auld – Associate Professor/Co-director VREL Emeritus

== Publication ==
VR in the Schools, a peer-reviewed publication of the Virtual Reality and Education Laboratory, has been distributed in both print and electronic versions. Permission is granted to reproduce and/or electronically distribute this journal in its entirety and without cost. Currently, VR in the Schools is an occasional publication, usually published only in electronic form.

The co-editors of VR in the Schools are: Dr. Veronica S. Pantelidis and Mr. David Vinciguerra. Dr. Lawrence Auld is co-editor emeritus.

The editorial advisors are: Dr. Tassos Mikropoulos, Department of Primary Education, University of Ioannina, Ioannina, Greece; Dr. Melissa M. Selverian, Temple University, Philadelphia, Pennsylvania, USA; Ms. Debra S. Pylypiw, Art Educator, White Oak High School, Jacksonville, North Carolina, USA.

== Graduate degree ==
VREL offers a graduate degree – Virtual Reality Concentration in MAEd Program (24 semester hours). A concentration in virtual reality is offered in the Master of Arts in Education, Instructional Technology degree program, at East Carolina University. The concentration, intended for students who are interested in using virtual reality in education and training settings, includes four VR courses: Virtual Reality: Principles and Applications; Building and Using Graphics-Based Virtual Environments for Education; Building and Using Text-Based Virtual Reality Environments for Education; and Seminar on Virtual Reality and Education.

== Certificates ==
The educational objectives of the Certificate in Virtual Reality in Education and Training are to provide interested persons an opportunity to learn to use basic virtual reality software and to apply that knowledge in educational and training settings.
