= Nebria macedonica =

Scientific classification
- Domain: Eukaryota
- Kingdom: Animalia
- Phylum: Arthropoda
- Class: Insecta
- Order: Coleoptera
- Suborder: Adephaga
- Family: Carabidae
- Genus: Nebria
- Species: N. macedonica

Binomial name
- Nebria macedonica Maran, 1938

Species of beetle

Nebria macedonica is a species of ground beetle in the Nebriinae subfamily that can be found in Varnous province of Greece and on Baba Mountain of North Macedonia.
