= Stergios Misios =

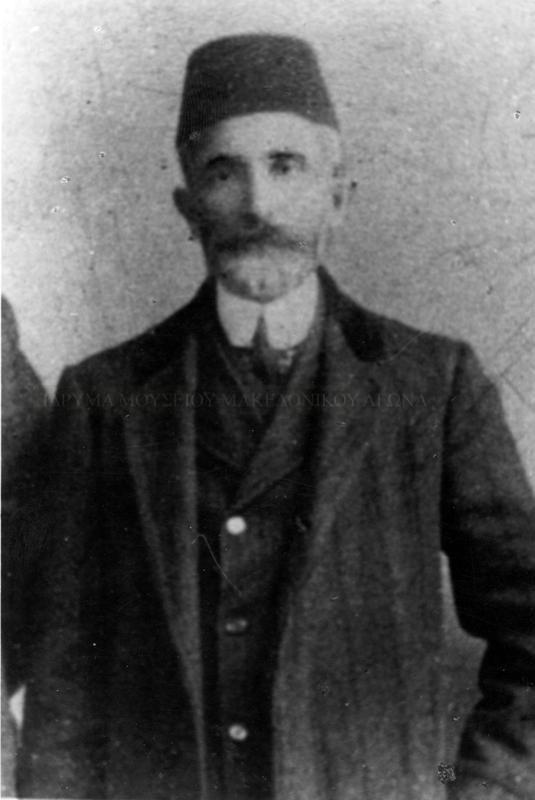
The headman Stergios Misios

Stergios Misios acted as a headman during the Macedonian struggle in Greece. He was born in Agios Germanos in north Greece.

== Biography ==
He was born at the end of the 19th century in Agios Germanos. He participated from the very beginning to the Macedonian Struggle as a head of local army in order to protect his territory from Bulgarian and Ottoman attacks. He fought in several places in northern Greece, especially in the vicinity of lake Prespa, Korestia and Peristeri.
