= Agios Germanos =

Village in Western Macedonia, Greece

Agios Germanos Άγιος Γερμανός
- Community
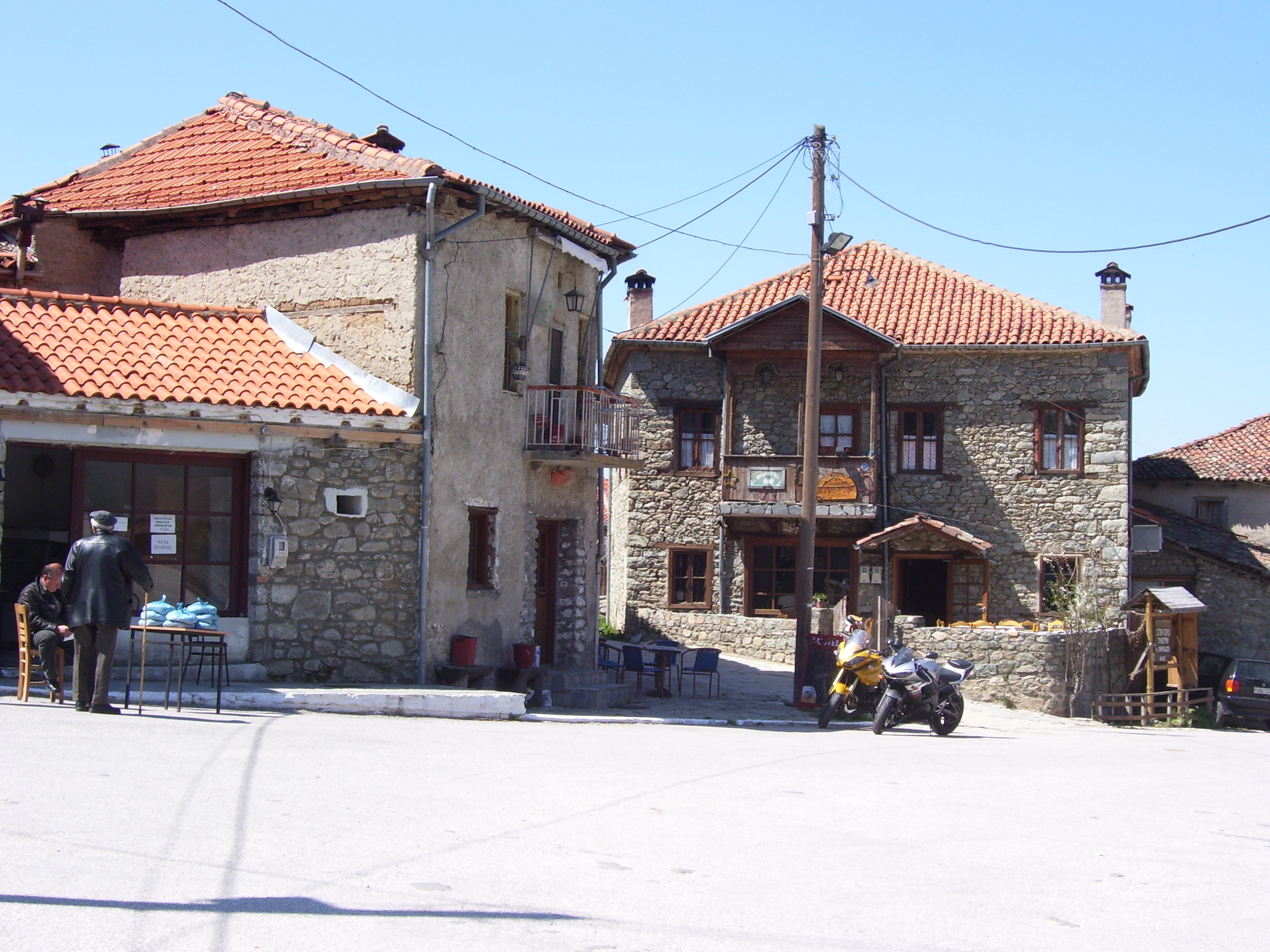
- Village square

- Location within Greece
- Coordinates: 40°50.18′N 21°09.32′E
- Country: Greece
- Administrative region: Western Macedonia
- Regional unit: Florina
- Municipality: Prespes
- Municipal unit: Prespes
- Elevation: 1,050 m (3,440 ft)

Population (2021)
  - Community: 161
- Time zone: UTC+2 (EET)
  - Summer (DST): UTC+3 (EEST)

Agios Germanos (Greek: Άγιος Γερμανός) is a village in the Prespes Municipality in Western Macedonia, Greece. The village has traditional architecture of stone houses, Byzantine churches and forests. Agios Germanos is close to both Prespa Lakes and located in a valley at the base of the Varnous Mountains, near the border with North Macedonia. Agios Germanos has a kindergarten, primary school (built in 1922) and police station.

== Name ==
Until 1926, the village was known as German (Greek: Γέρμαν). Named after the old village church Sveti German (Saint Germanus), the settlement is known as Герман, German in Macedonian and Bulgarian. In Albanian, the village is called Gjerman. The modern Greek name Agios Germanos is also derived from the village church.

== Geography ==
Agios Germanos as a municipal unit is 60,500 acres and its largest community is the village of the same name. The village is located on the western part of a valley at the lower end of the Varnous Mountains and is close to the border with North Macedonia. Agios Germanos is at an altitude of approximately 1,050 m (3,440 ft) and is 7 kilometers (4.3 mi) from the Prespa lakes. It lies 54 km (34 mi) from Kastoria and 45 km (28 mi) from Florina.

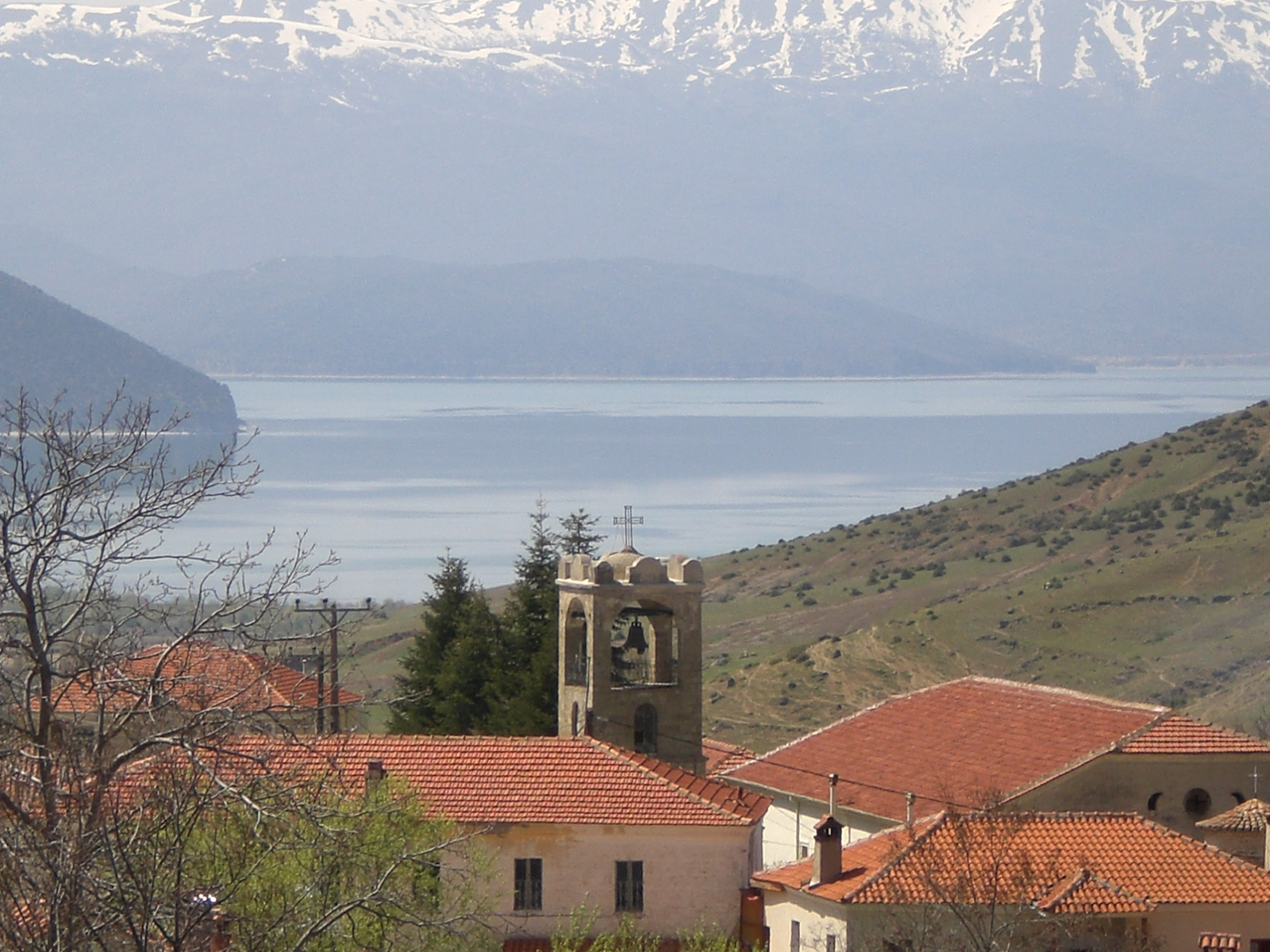
Agios Germanos with Small Prespa Lake in the background

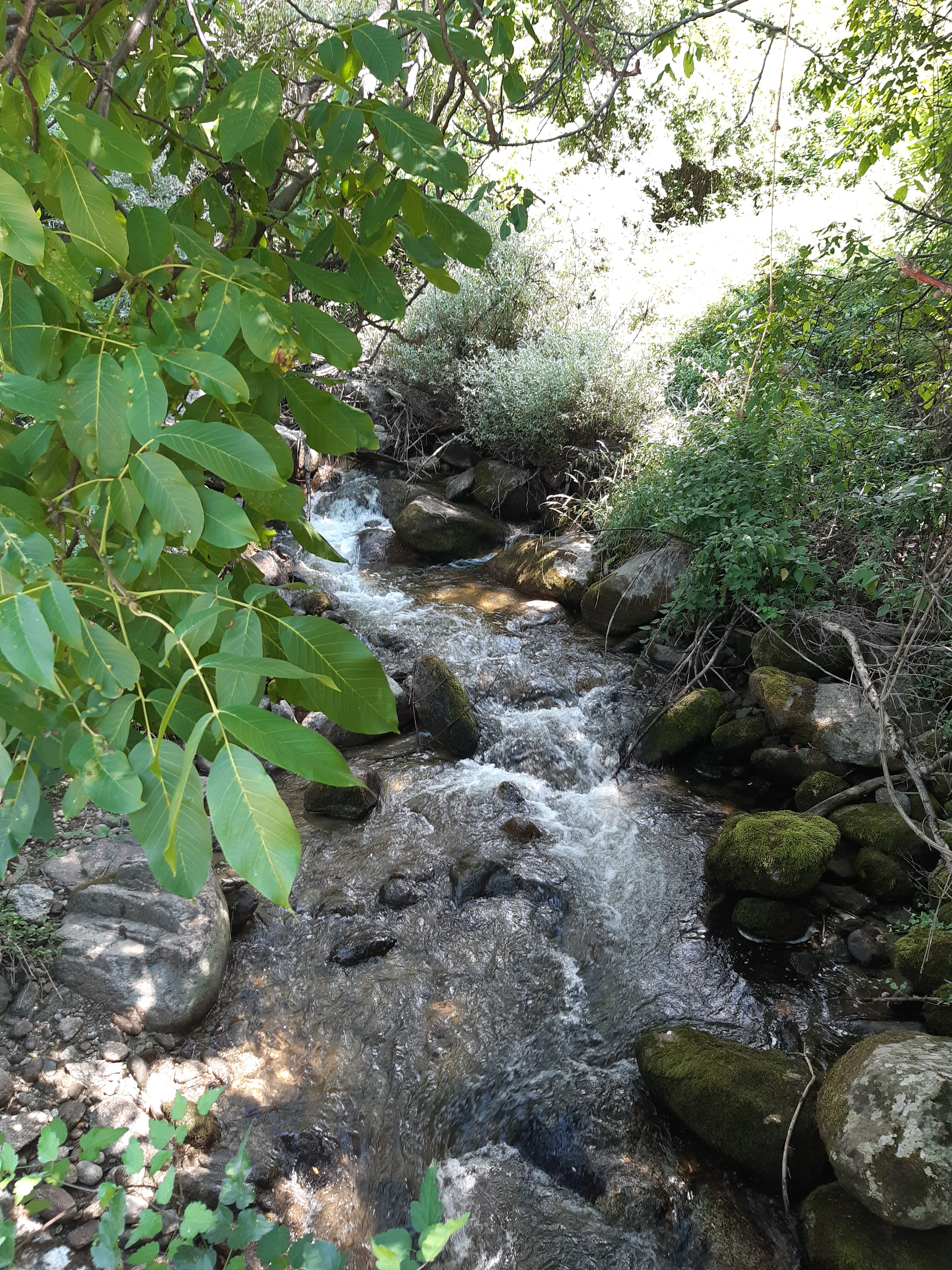
Stara river

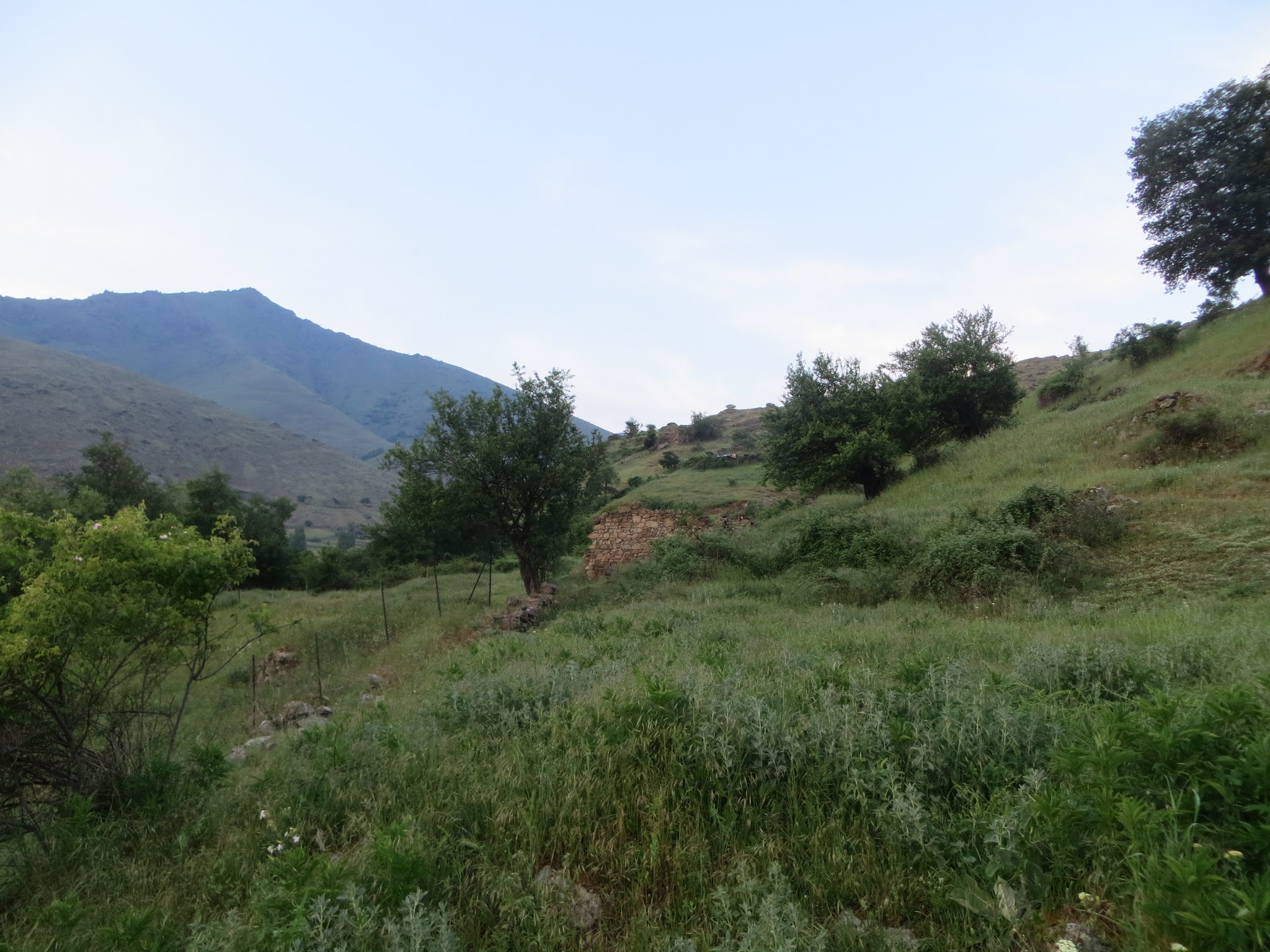
Grasslands of Agios Germanos

The total land area of the village Agios Germanos is 5,995 hectares, split almost between forest and grasslands, followed by use for agriculture and the small remainder for dwellings and other uses. The soils in the surrounding hills of Agios Germanos have undergone extensive soil erosion, due to agricultural and grazing over use. Woodland flora in the area are oak and beech trees.

The village stream, the Stara river (or Agios Germanos river) is one of four major tributaries and catchment systems delivering water flows to Lake Prespa. Previously, the river flowed into Small Prespa Lake until the 1930s when it was diverted to the larger Prespa Lake and later into a local irrigation scheme in the Greek Prespa area. The endangered species of Prespa trout live in the Agios Germanos river.

== History ==
In the 1870s villagers of German were religiously split between supporters of the Patriarchate and Exarchate. According to exiled villagers in Yugoslav Macedonia from the 1970s, Macedonian identity in German also began to emerge in this period. In 1888, a commemorative Bulgarian Cyrillic inscription on a marble stone (c. 993) from Tsar Samuel honouring his family was unearthed in German.

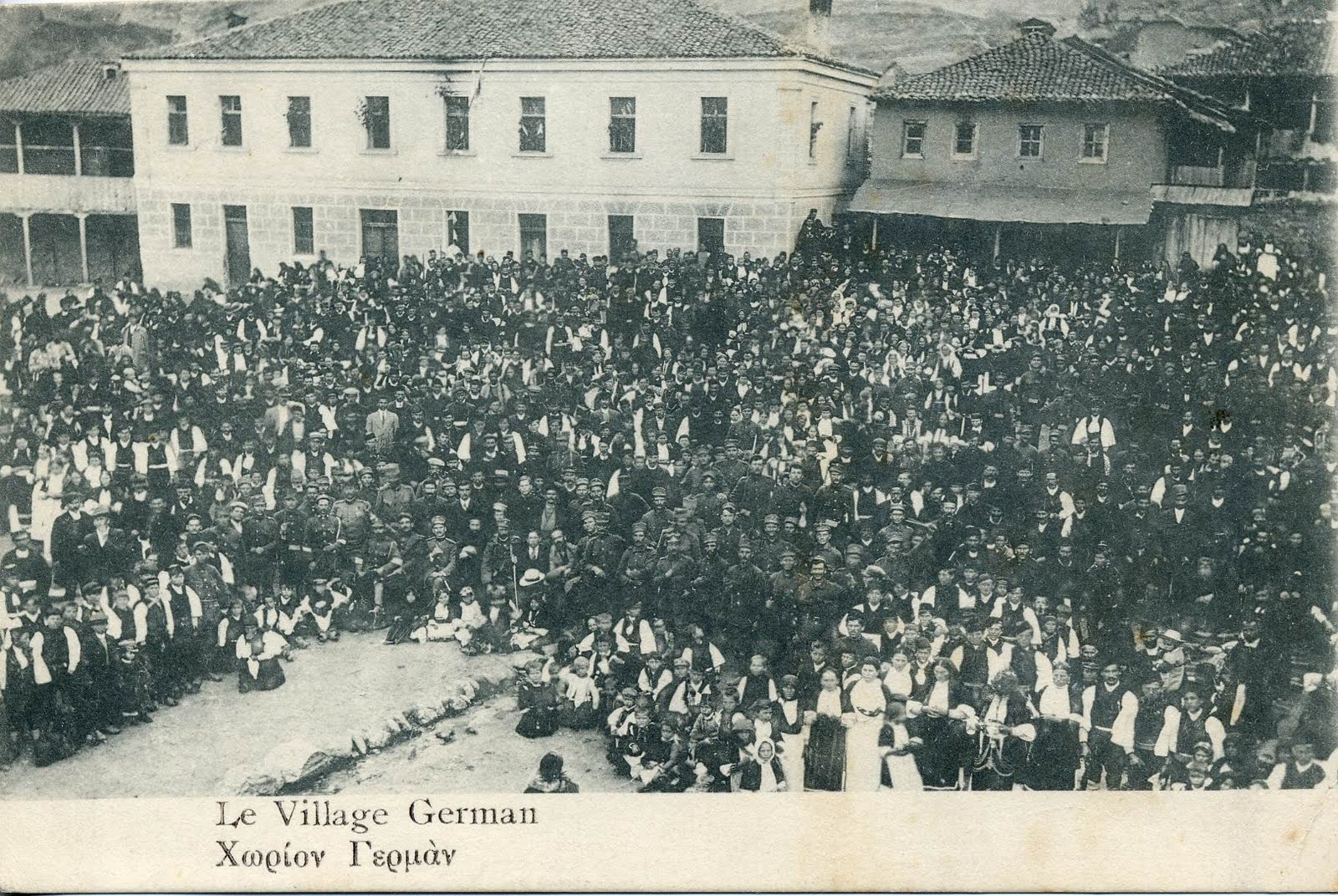
German, 1917

The Ilinden Uprising (1903) occurred and later German was part of Greece, with the villagers disappointed in the state for not implementing promised linguistic rights like use of the language primer Abecedar. In the First World War, German sheltered refugees from the villages of Arvati, Krani and Nakolec, while high rates of malaria were present due to the effects of conflict. German was impacted by the Greek–Turkish population exchange (1923) as its Muslim Albanian population left and the village received Greek refugees. The village was pro–Bulgarian.

Under Ioannis Metaxas, the interwar Greek Prime Minister, assimilationist policies were pursued and many local villagers were fined for using their language, possessing progressive literature or for supporting the Communist Party of Greece. The state also punished villagers for using their language through internment and other oppressive measures. A combination of these factors led the inhabitants of Agios Germanos to support Communism and its advocacy of self determination. A majority of villagers had anti–Greek or fluid sentiments until the Greek Civil War. In the Second World War, Agios Germanos was under the Italian occupation zone in Greece. Several villagers collaborated with Italian forces.

Agios Germanos was occupied by the Democratic Army of Greece (DAG) and was one of its important centres and used for logisitics, close to the Yugoslav border in the Greek Civil War. A Slavic Macedonian school was established in the village. In Agios Germanos, of the 288 inhabitants who fought throughout the civil war, 92 died in the conflict. During the period of the right–wing White Terror in Greece, 13 young communist men from the village were arrested and executed. In the civil war, DAG forces (either with or without parental permission) prepared to evacuate the children and the Greek Air Force bombed the village resulting in numerous casualties and razed buildings. Refugees, including children without their parents fled to the border and later into Eastern Europe.

The destroyed village became depopulated as most communist supporting inhabitants went to Skopje and Prague, many prompted forcefully by DAG and its communist leaders while others through their own choice. Some villagers later returned. Pontian Greeks and pro–Greek Aromanians were resettled by the Greek government in the village. From the 1950s onward, the village population of youth left for the cities and it led to a decline in knowledge of past customs and skills such as repairing stone houses in traditional ways. In Yugoslav Macedonia, exiled Slavophone inhabitants from the village published a book in 1979 titled Monograph with Memories: Album about the Village of German composed of research and oral testimonies by villagers.

After Greece became a member of the European Community (now European Union) in 1981, living conditions improved over time in the village due to monetary assistance from the organisation for agriculture. People who have origins from the village and live abroad in Australia, Canada, the Czech Republic and Hungary return to Agios Germanos in August for summer holidays.

== Demographics ==
The Slavophone villagers belong to the ethnographic group of Brsjaks. According to Bosnian ethnographer Stefan Verković, in 1889 the village had 213 households and a population of 1016 Bulgarians. In 1900, 680 Slavonic speaking Christians and 125 Albanian Muslims lived in the village. According to D.M. Brancoff, in 1905 the population had gone up to 1250 with 90 of them being Arnauts (Albanians) and the rest – Bulgarians. The village population had 1,450 Christians and 130 Muslims in 1912. During World War I, a French army survey team in the Prespa basin wrote the village was populated by Macedonian Slavs, Albanians and Romani.

The 1920 Greek census recorded 1,549 people in the village, and 135 inhabitants (17 families) were Muslim in 1923. The Muslim Albanian village population left in 1924 and in 1926 Greek refugees (prosfiges) settled in the village, due to the Greek–Turkish population exchange. A separate neighbourhood of the village named Shaoftsi (Macedonian: Шаофци) was inhabited by Muslims and later repopulated by Greek refugees. In 1926, 909 Greek refugee families in the village were from Asia Minor. The 1928 Greek census recorded 1,622 village inhabitants. People abandoned the village and fled to Yugoslavia and other Eastern Bloc countries in 1949. From 1940 to 1951, the population of Agios Germanos went from 2,177 inhabitants to 439, a reduction of 80 percent due in particular to the Greek Civil War. In 1951 the village was uninhabited, later evacuees returned.

After the civil war, the Macedonian speaking population decreased and in their place the Greek government resettled Pontian Greeks and pro–Greek Aromanians in the village. The Aromanians originated from Giannitsa and the region of Greek Epirus. The population was 689 in 1961. In the early 1970s, some 20 Christian Macedonian speaking families resided in the village. Agios Germanos had 237 inhabitants in 1981.

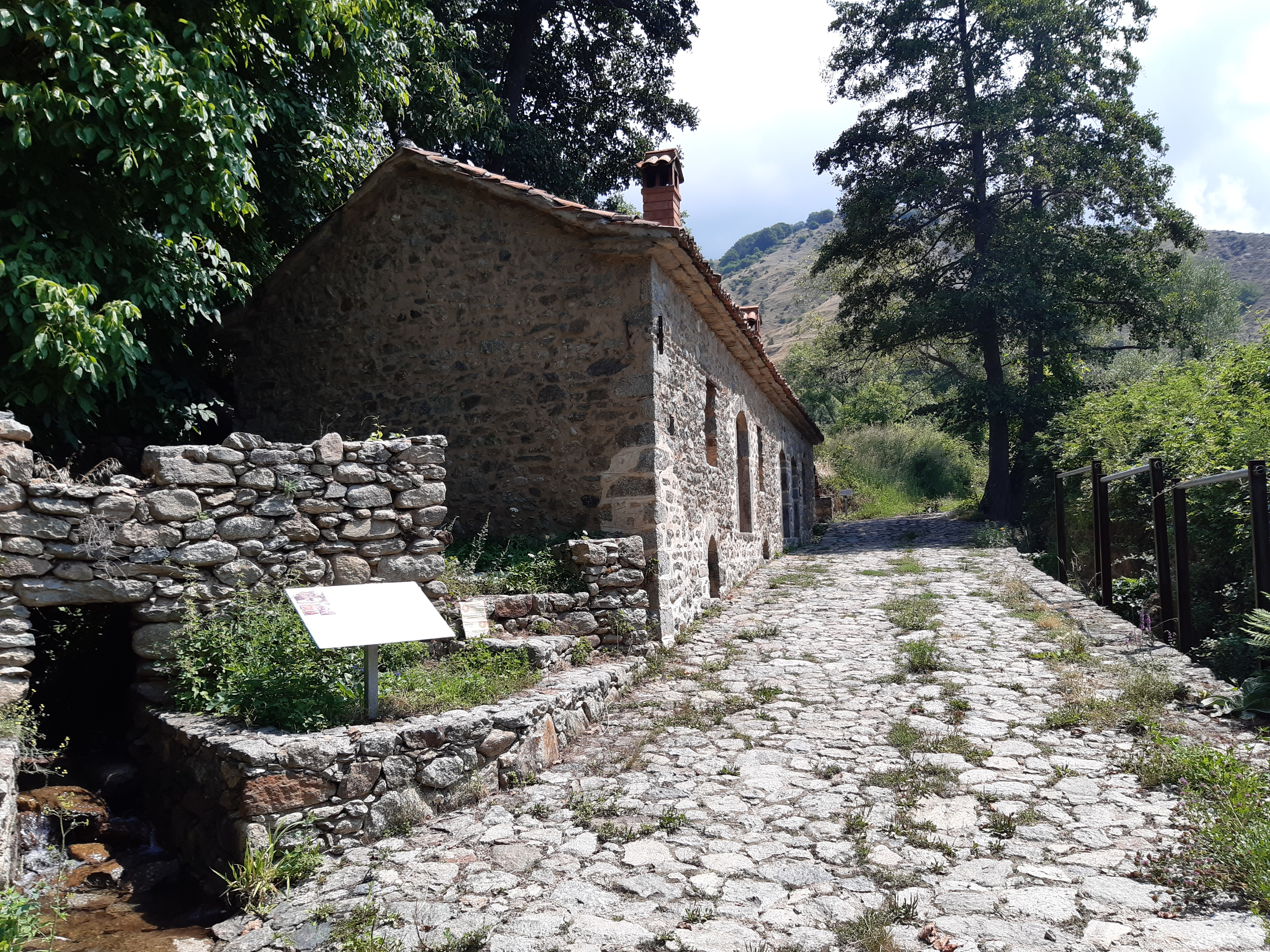
Old water mill

In fieldwork done by anthropologist Riki Van Boeschoten in late 1993, Agios Germanos was populated by Aromanians, Slavophones and a Greek population descended from Anatolian Greek refugees who arrived during the Greek–Turkish population exchange. The Macedonian language was used by people of all ages, both in public and private settings, and as the main language for interpersonal relationships. Some elderly villagers had little knowledge of Greek. The Aromanian language was spoken in the village by people over 30 in public and private settings. Children understood the language, but mostly did not use it. In 2011, Agios Germanos was populated by 182 people. The modern village population is small and in decline.

== Economy ==
During the interwar period, Agios Germanos was the prominent village of the Greek Prespa area, being large and prosperous. Until the 1960s, 9 village water mills operated along the river, one was a sawmill, the rest used for grinding grain. Later all disused and abandoned, several have been restored in the early 21st century for heritage preservation. The modern village economy is based on livestock, lumbering and tourism. The main agricultural crop grown in the village are beans.

== Attractions ==
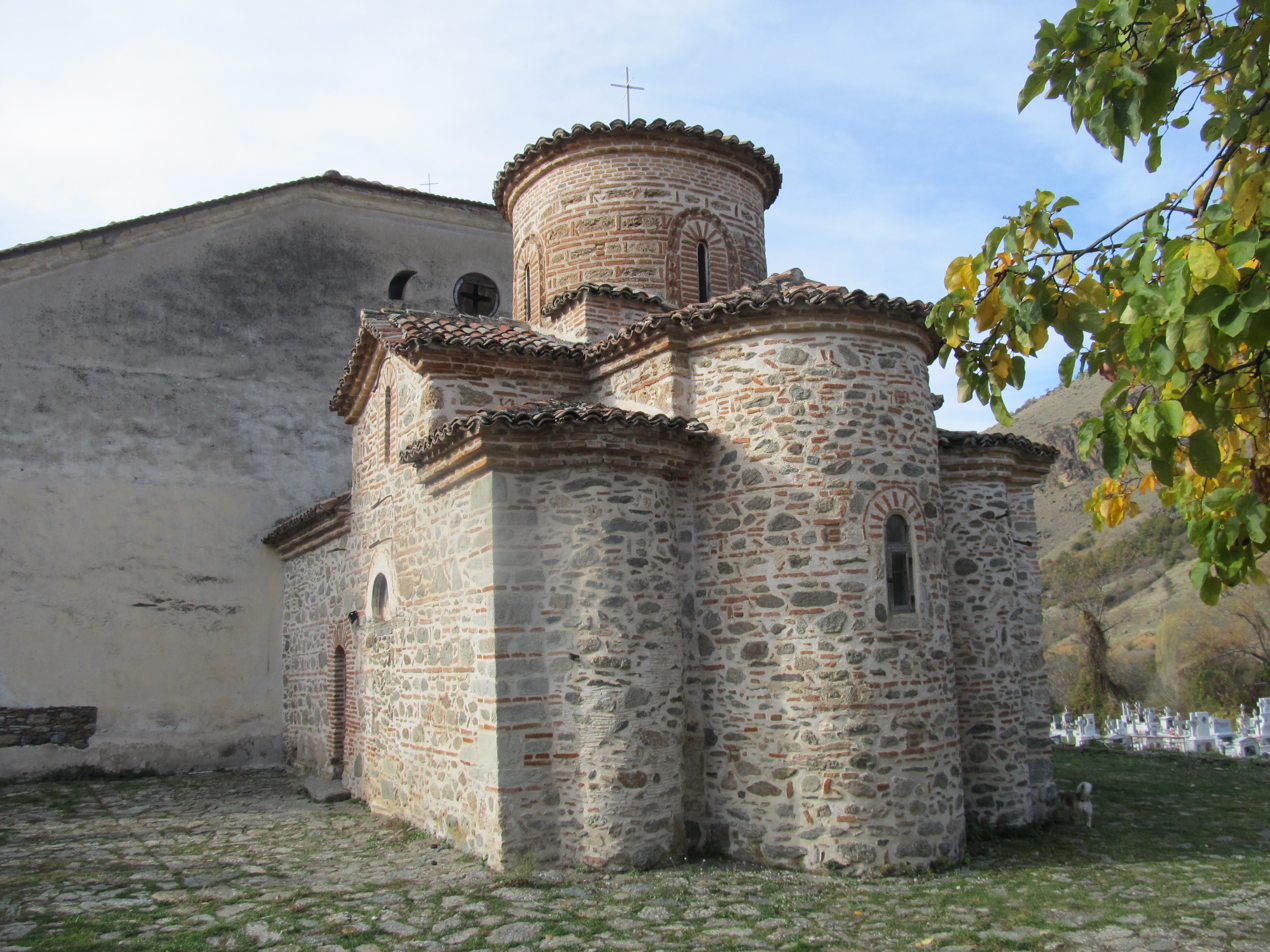
Agios Germanos church

A traditional village, the architecture of Agios Germanos consists mainly of old stone houses, some which have become abandoned over time. The Byzantine church of Agios Germanos dates from the 11th century and has important frescos. Near the village, the Byzantine Interpretative Centre is based in a building from the Ottoman period. The village is visited by tourists for bird watching, in particular the Dalmatian pelican, for forest walks or to see the Byzantine frescos in the rocky cliffs.

The Society for the Protection of Prespa (SPP), a local organisation devoted to safeguarding the environment of Lake Prespa was founded in Agios Germanos during 1990 and is based in the village. The Prespa Park Visitor Centre is an information centre located at the SPP premises. In 2000, Albania, North Macedonia and Greece, three countries sharing Lake Prespa signed a multilateral treaty in Agios Germanos covering protection and development along with creating a proposed pan–National Lake Prespa Park. Implementation of the initiative has been slow and stalled over the years.
