= Saak Ovsepian =

Armenian-Irish neuroscientist

Professor Saak Ovsepian
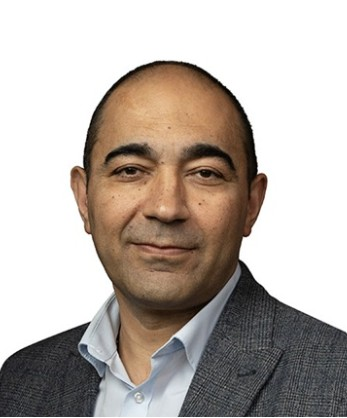
- Born: Saak Victor Ovsepian; August 14, 1972 (age 54); Georgia
- Citizenship: Irish, Armenian
- Education: YSU, IEBP St. Petersburg (PhD)
- Known for: Neurobiology Molecular Imaging, Biomarkers of Disease
- Spouse: Valerie B. O’Leary (died 2024)
- Medical career
- Institutions: University of Greenwich, Tbilisi State University

Saak Victor Ovsepian (Armenian: Սահակ Վիկտորի Հովսեփյան) is a neuroscientist best known for his research in neurobiology, neurotherapeutics and translational biosciences.

== Education and career ==
Ovsepian started his education in Heshtia, Republic of Georgia followed by studies of medicine at the Medical College in Tyumen. During this period, he worked as a physician assistant at a local psychiatric asylum. After completing his medical training, he served as a conscript in Eastern Germany, working as a military physician. In 1994, Ovsepian enrolled in Omsk State Pedagogical University to study biology, psychology and philosophy. In 1996, he moved to Yerevan, where he graduated from the State University with an MSc in Biology - Human Physiology in 1999. From 2017, he served as a professor, Director of the Experimental Neurobiology Program, Head of the Department of Experimental Neurosciences at the National Institute of Mental Health (NIMH) Klecany, and the 3rd Faculty of Medicine Charles University of Prague. He also worked as a Research Director of Neuroimaging at Dublin City University. He was a professor in Biosciences and the Lead of Applied Molecular Biology at the University of Greenwich, where he provided leadership in research, education and strategic development before pursuing senior advisory and consulting appointments across higher education and the life sciences sector.

== Research career ==
Ovsepian has written papers on synaptic biology and pathobiology, translational neuroscience, neurotherapeutics, molecular imaging, and disease biomarkers. In 2014, he proposed the adaptive hypothesis of the origin of the chemical synapse, suggesting that the key molecular scaffolds of synapses evolved independently of neurons. In 2016, he formulated the homeostatic hypothesis of the basal forebrain cholinergic system, which highlights the role of basal-cortical projections in the clearance of amyloid β peptide in the healthy and diseased brain. In 2019, he put forward the brain's dark matter hypothesis, which advocates for a substantial redundancy of neurons in the mammalian brain, maintained in a dormant state. His current research focuses on the molecular and cellular mechanisms underlying normal brain function, neurodegenerative and neuropsychiatric diseases, and biomarkers of brain diseases. He employs advanced imaging and neurophysiology techniques in cell cultures and preclinical models to investigate a wide range of basic and translational biology questions.

Ovsepian's journey in neuroscience began as a research assistant at the Orbeli Institute of Physiology (1998-2000), where he pursued electrophysiology research. He then completed his PhD studies in the laboratory of Synaptic Evolution at the Sechenov Institute of Physiology, with a thesis on the evolution of presynaptic regulatory mechanisms. Following the completion of his doctoral studies, he joined Trinity College Dublin in 2003 as a Research Associate. In 2005, Ovsepian moved to Case Western Reserve University. Later, he joined the Centre for Molecular and Behavioural Neurosciences at the State University of Rutgers, New Jersey. In 2009, he became the Head of Neuroimaging and Drug Screening at the International Centre for Neurotherapeutics, Dublin City University. From 2013 to 2017, Ovsepian served as the Head of Electrophysiology at the German Centre for Neurodegenerative Disease (DZNE) Munich and Chair of Biological Imaging at Munich - Technical University. From 2017 he served as the Director of the Experimental Neurobiology Program at the NIMH Prague. From 2020, he is a professor in Biosciences at the University of Greenwich, London.

== Awards and honors ==
Saak Ovsepian has received awards and recognitions for his contributions to the field of neuroscience. He was granted the Innovation Fund Award, Rolf-Becker-Prize (joint with collaborators from DZNE), the Award for Neurotherapeutics Research, and the first prize at the International Congress for Neurology. In 2021 he received a JPND European Union Joint Program – Neurodegenerative Disease Research Award to lead the REMOPD consortium in Parkinson's Disease research. In 2022, he was elected as a Fellow of the British Royal Society of Biology.

== Editorships ==
Ovsepian holds several scientific editorial positions in the field of neuroscience. He serves as an Associate Editor for the Journal of Brain Structure and Function and is a member of the editorial board of the Journal of Evolutionary Biochemistry and Physiology. Ovsepian also serves as a Section Editor of the Brain Sciences journal. He is a reviewer of many journals including Brain, Journal of Neuroscience, Nature Communications, Neuron, Alzheimer's and Dementia, Neurotherapeutics, and others.

== Selected publications ==
- Saak V Ovsepian, Stephen Waxman. “Gene therapy for chronic pain: emerging opportunities in target-rich peripheral nociceptors”. Nat Rev Neurosci.
- Pascal Jorratt, Cyril Hoschl, Saak V Ovsepian. “Endogenous antagonists of N-methyl-d-aspartate receptor in schizophrenia”. Alzheimers Dement.
- Saak V Ovsepian SV. “The dark matter of the brain”. Brain Struct Funct.
- Saak V Ovsepian, Valerie B O'Leary, Laszlo Zaborszky, Vasilis Ntziachristos, J Oliver Dolly. "Synaptic vesicle cycle and amyloid β: Biting the hand that feeds". Alzheimer's & Dementia.
- Saak V Ovsepian, Ivan Olefir, Gil Westmeyer, Daniel Razansky, Vasilis Ntziachristos. "Pushing the boundaries of neuroimaging with optoacoustics". Neuron.
- Saak V Ovsepian, Marie LeBerre, Volker Steuber, Valerie B O'Leary, Christian Leibold, J Oliver Dolly. "Distinctive role of KV1.1 subunit in the biology and functions of low threshold K+ channels with implications for neurological disease". Pharmacology & therapeutics.
