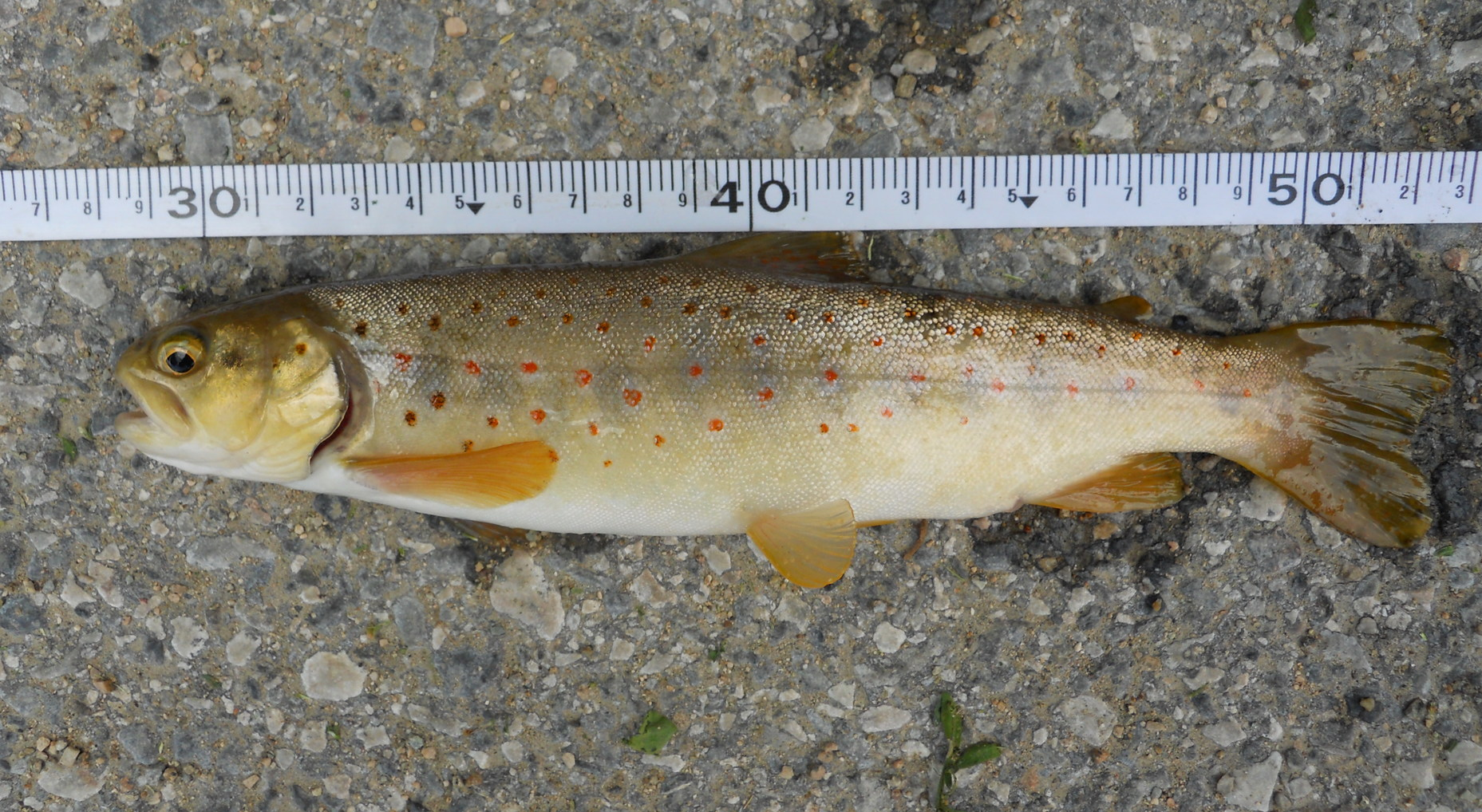
- Salmo peristericus in Greece

Conservation status
- Endangered (IUCN 3.1)

Scientific classification
- Kingdom: Animalia
- Phylum: Chordata
- Class: Actinopterygii
- Order: Salmoniformes
- Family: Salmonidae
- Genus: Salmo
- Species: S. peristericus

Binomial name
- Salmo peristericus S. L. Karaman, 1938

= Salmo peristericus =

Species of fish

Salmo peristericus, or the Prespa trout is a variety of trout, a freshwater fish in the family Salmonidae. It is endemic to the Lake Prespa watershed at the border area of Greece and North Macedonia.

Four populations are known: one in the Agios Germanos stream in northwestern Greece, and the others in the Brajcinska and Kranska rivers and the Leva Reka stream of North Macedonia.

The Prespa trout is morphologically difficult to separate from other trouts of the region. Genetic data show it is close to and derived from the Adriatic lineage of brown trout, and do not support a distinct species status. Nevertheless, its protection as an Evolutionary Significant Unit is justified regardless of the taxonomic status.
