= Varnous =

Mountain in Greece

- Location within Greece

Highest point
- Elevation: 2,334 m (7,657 ft)
- Coordinates: 40°52′26″N 21°14′35″E

Geography
- Location: northern Florina regional unit, Greece

Varnous or Varnoundas (Greek: Βαρνούντας, also called Peristeri) is a mountain in northern Florina regional unit, Greece, situated between the town of Florina and Lake Prespa, and just south of the border with North Macedonia. Its highest peak, named Gkarvani, is 2,334 m. It is part of the same massif that continues northwards into the Baba mountains in North Macedonia with Mount Pelister (2,601 m) as its highest peak.

Other mountaintops includes Belavoda (Μπελαβόδα - meaning 'white water' in the local Slavic language) at 2,179 m, Kirko (Κίρκο) at 2,155 m, Kotsyfa or Potistres (Κότσυφα or Ποτίστρες) at 2,065 m and more.

== Trails ==
The E6 European long distance path passes over the Varnous mountain, leading through Agios Germanos and Vigla Pisoderiou.

== Ecology ==
The mountain is largely forested with spruce, it has an upper alpine vegetation in the highest points of the mountain. It features large animals including bears, wolves, roebucks, wild boars and wild goats. The western part of the mountain is part of Prespa Park.
