= Ioannina Medical School =

Medical school in Greece

Ioannina Medical School is one of the seven medical schools in Greece. It is located in the University of Ioannina campus in Ioannina, Greece.

== History ==
It was founded in 1977, together with the medical schools at the University of Patras and the Democritus University of Thrace. Its evolvement is considered impressive, considering its achievements and reputation, within such a short time period. The medical education program lasts at least 6 years, with 200 students entering the Medical School via National-wide exams every year. There also several postgraduate and Ph.D. programs.

== Structure ==
It has an increasing number of faculty members (177 in 2011, consisting of 47 Professors, 46 Associate Professors, 53 Assistant Professors and 31 Lecturers), aiming to serve its missions in education, clinical practice and research. In addition the permanent staff includes Administrative Staff and Specialized Technical Personnel. The School of Medicine is subdivided into seven (7) Sections:

Section of Clinical and Basic Functional Sciences, Section of Morphological and Clinical-Laboratory Sciences, Section of Social Medicine and Mental Health, Section of Surgery, Section of Child Health, Section of Internal Medicine and Section of Neural System and Sensory Organs.
