= Stergios Felegakis =

Greek footballer

Personal information
- Full name: Asterios Felegakis
- Date of birth: 24 April 1986 (age 40)
- Place of birth: Rhodes, Greece
- Height: 1.80 m (5 ft 11 in)
- Position: Defender

Youth career
- Panathinaikos

Senior career*
Years	Team	Apps	(Gls)
2005–2007	Koropi		
2007–2009	Panetolikos	14	(0)
2009–2010	Aittitos Spata		
2010–2013	Triglia Rafina F.C.		
2013–2014	Almyros		
2014–	Fivos Kremasti		
- * Club domestic league appearances and goals

Stergios Felegakis (Greek: Στέργιος Φελεγκάκης; born 24 April 1986 in Rhodes, Greece) is a professional football defender. Felegakis started his career from the Panathinaikos academy. After one year on loan at Koropi F.C., he was transferred to Panetolikos, where he played for two years in the Greek third division.

In the summer of 2009, Felegakis transferred to Aittitos Spata.

== See also ==
- Football in Greece
- List of football clubs in Greece
