= Arvati =

Arvati Арвати Arvat
- Village
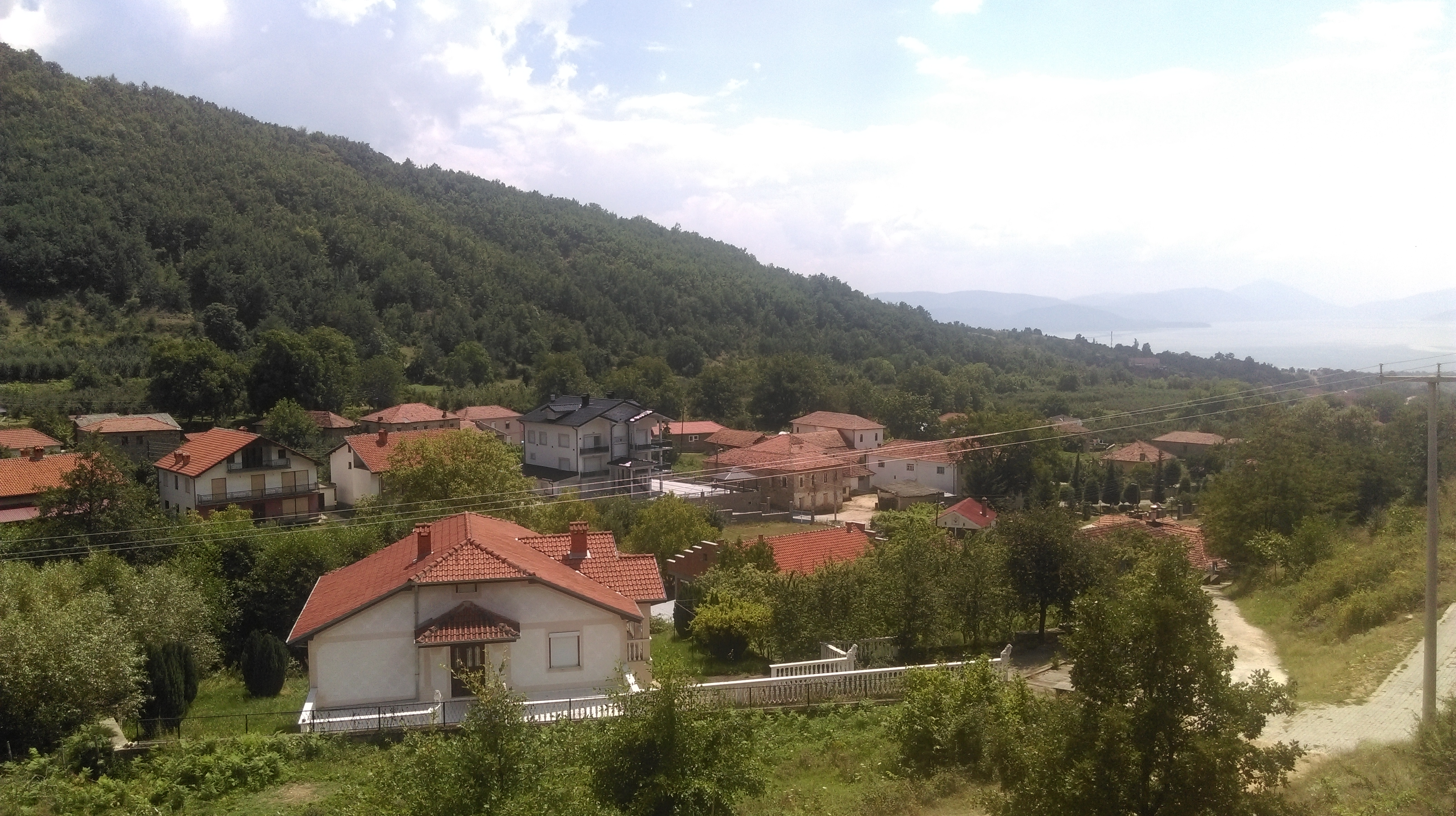
- Panoramic view of the village Arvati

- Location within North Macedonia
- Coordinates: 40°56′37″N 21°06′47″E
- Country: North Macedonia
- Region: Pelagonia
- Municipality: Resen

Population (2021)
  - Total: 119
- Time zone: UTC+1 (CET)
  - Summer (DST): UTC+2 (CEST)
- Area code: +389
- Car plates: RE

Arvati (Macedonian: Арвати; Albanian: Arvat) is a village in the Resen Municipality of North Macedonia. Located 18.5 kilometres (11.5 mi) from the municipal centre of Resen, the village has 137 residents. It is situated east of Lake Prespa, at the foot of Baba Mountain.

== History ==
In the 19th century, Arvati was part of the Manastir Sanjak, a subdivision of the Manastir Vilayet of the Ottoman Empire.

== Demographics ==
The demographics of Arvati are written in several Macedonian sources. According to Yordan Iliev Yordanov, Arvati in 1873 had 45 households and 136 male inhabitants (80 Macedonian and 56 Muslims). In 1905, Dimitar Mishev (D.M Brancoff) wrote Arvati's population consisted of Macedonians and 186 Albanians. In the early twentieth century, Vasil Kanchov wrote Arvati had 325 people composed of 160 Christian Macedonians, 100 Muslim Albanians and 65 Romani.

From the mid twentieth century onward, Arvati's population has consisted of Orthodox Macedonians and Sunni Muslim Albanians, with the latter forming a majority.

Ethnic group	census 1961		census 1971		census 1981		census 1991		census 1994		census 2002		census 2021	
Ethnic group	Number	%	Number	%	Number	%	Number	%	Number	%	Number	%	Number	%
Macedonians	179	36.5	150	28.0	160	31.6	149	28.9	54	29.5	51	37.2	37	31.1
Albanians	310	63.3	383	71.5	344	67.9	366	71.1	129	70.5	85	62.0	82	68.9
others	1	0.2	3	0.6	3	0.6	0	0.0	0	0.0	1	0.5	0	0.0
Total	490		536		507		515		183		137		119	

The mothers tongues of the residents, much like the ethnic affiliations, include 51 native Macedonian speakers, 84 Albanian speakers, and two with a different mother tongue.

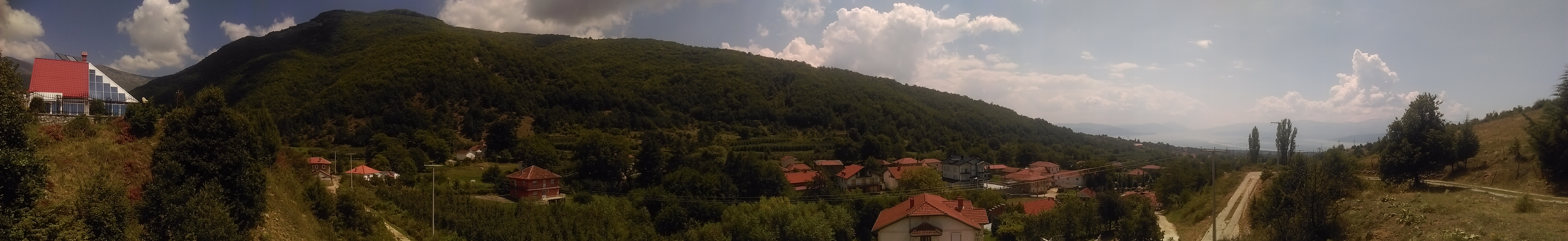
Panorama of Arvati showing extensions of the Baba mountains and Lake Prespa to far east

=== Religion ===
The religious affiliations of the village's residents also followed ethnic lines, with 51 identifying as Orthodox Christians, 85 as Muslims, and one as something else, as of the 2002 census.

Arvati is home to four churches dedicated to St Nicholas, Sts Constantine and Elena, St Archangel Michael, and the Ascension of the Virgin Mary.

== Gallery ==
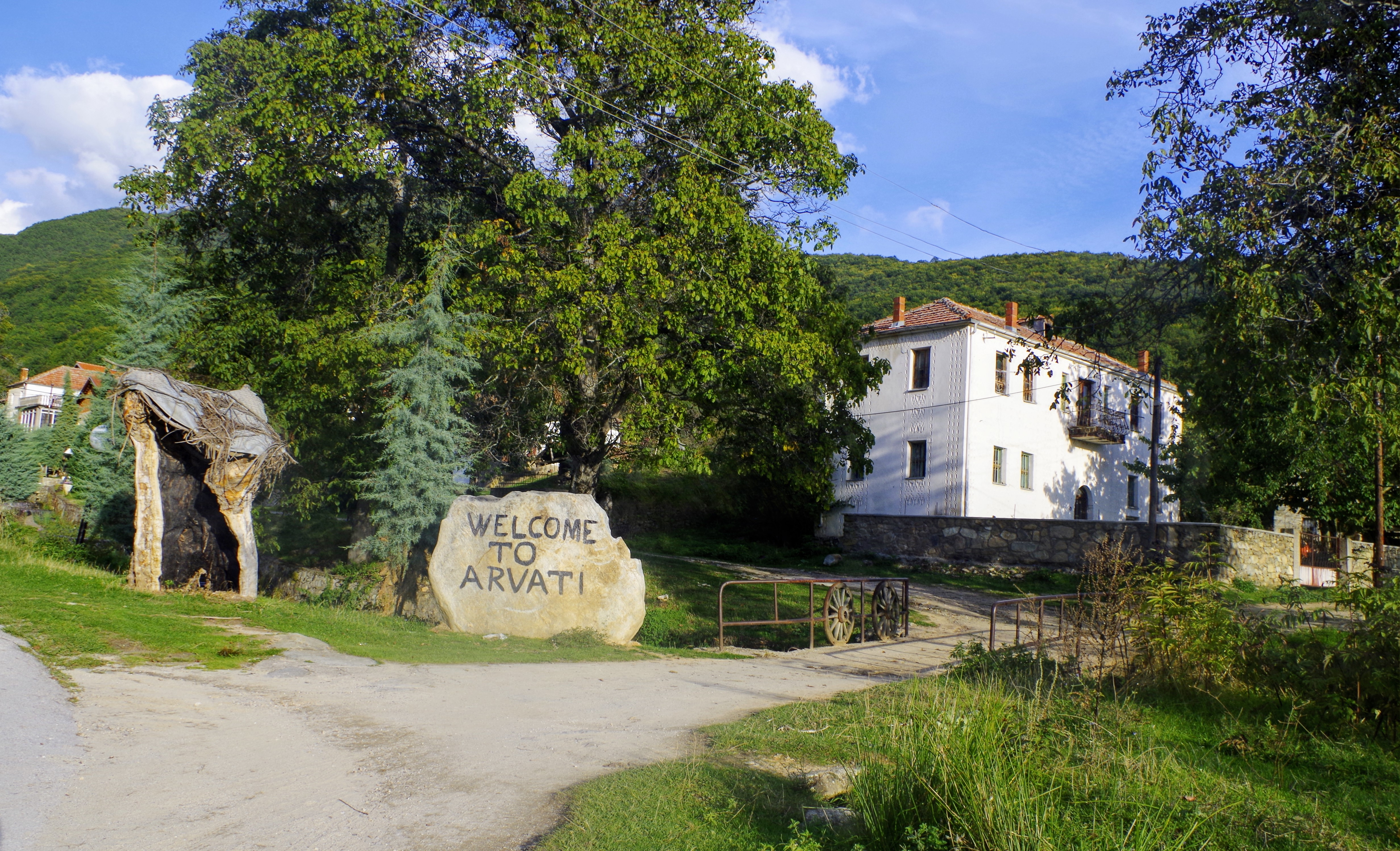
Centre of Arvati with a welcome greeting written on a big stone

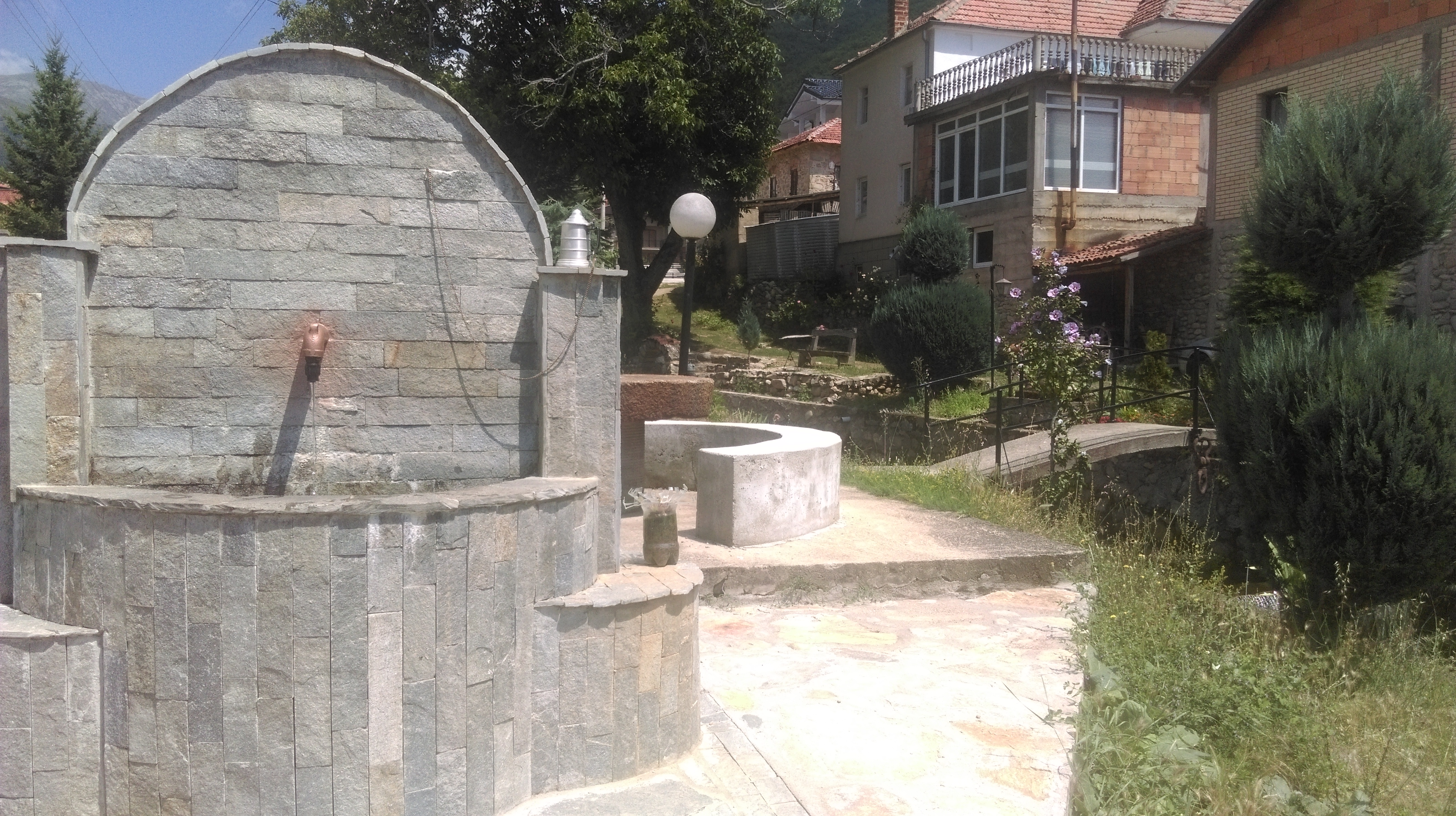
Village water fountain, Arvati centre

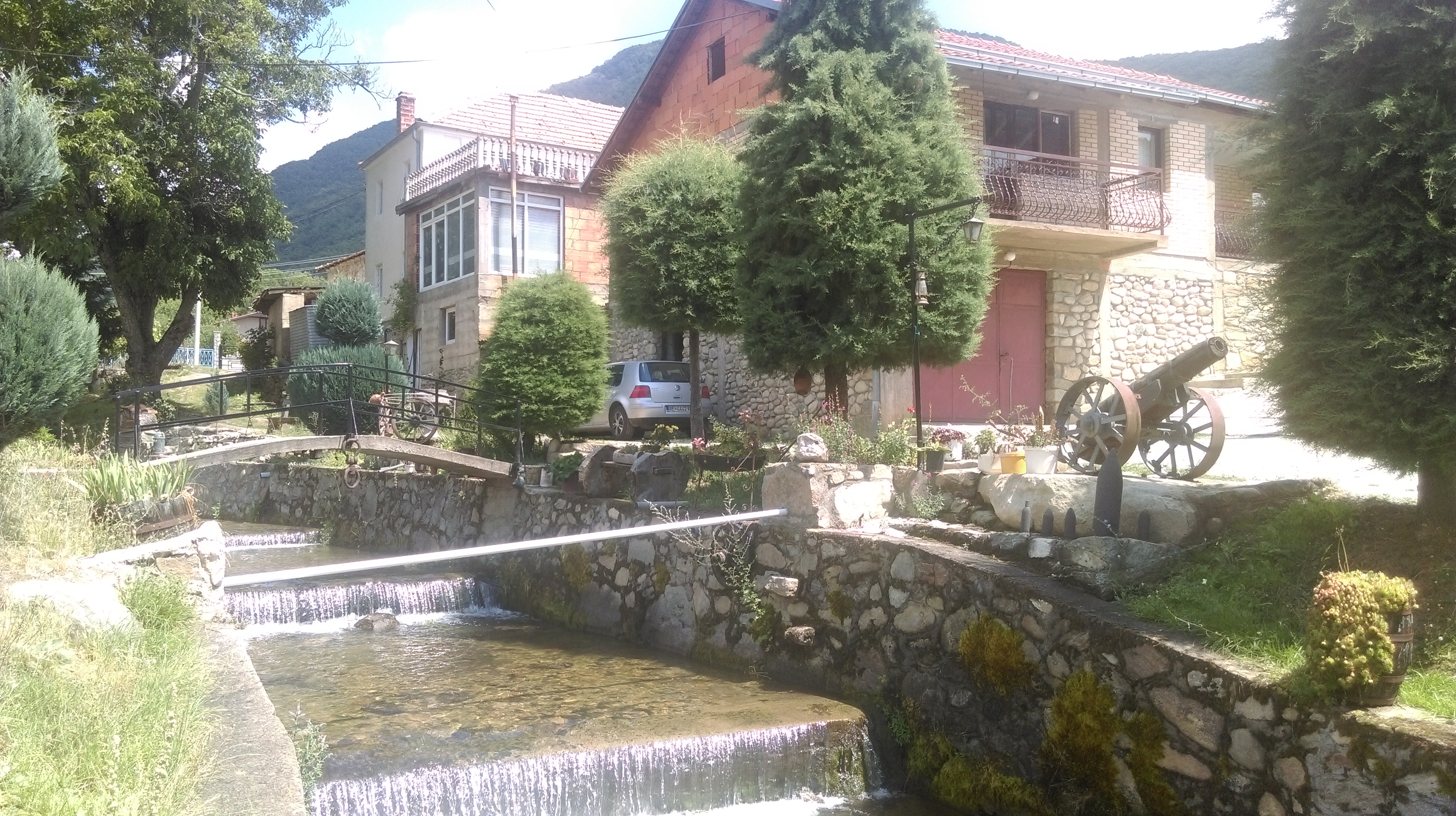
Krani river and traditional architecture of Arvati

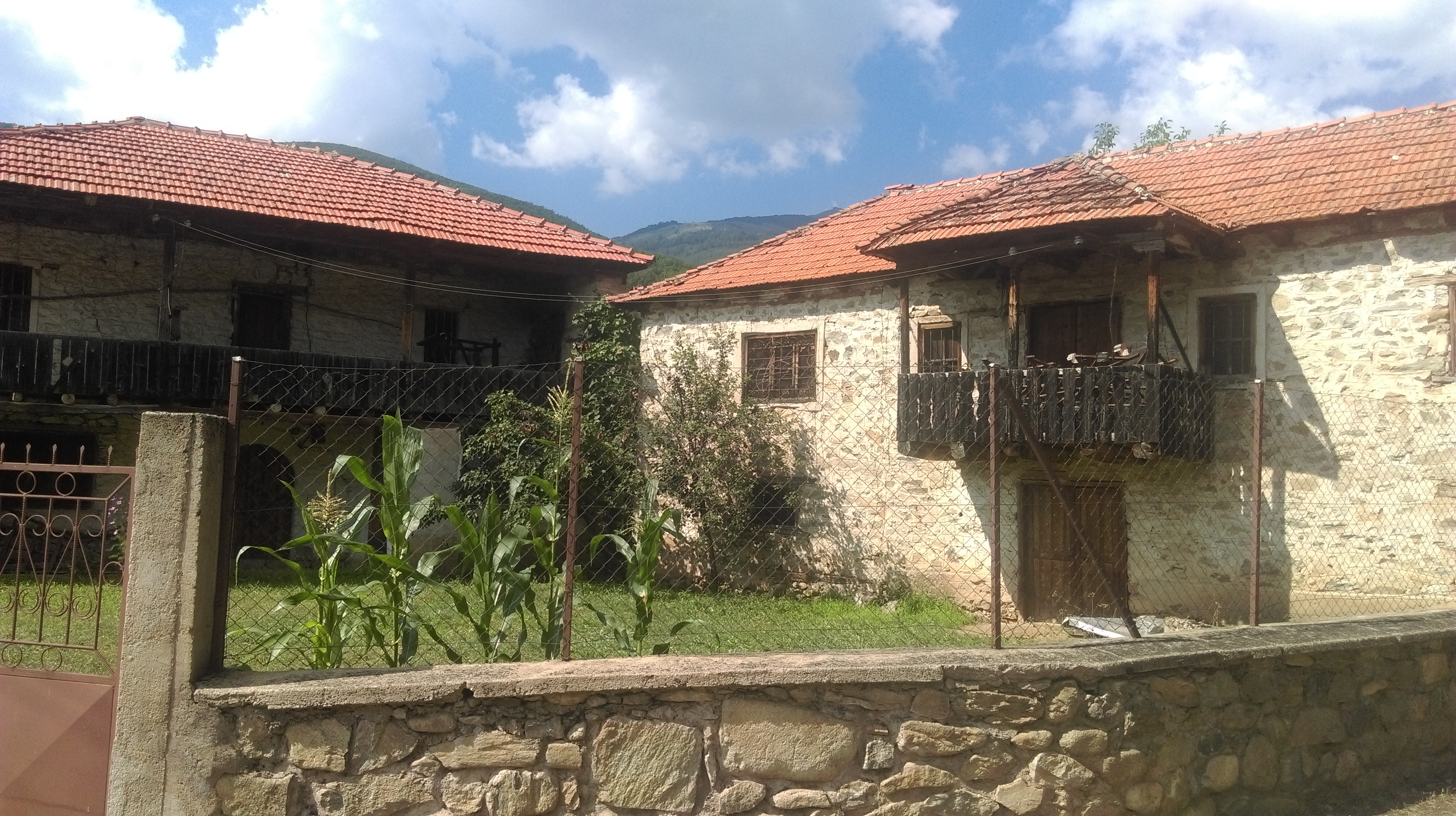
Traditional architecture of Arvati

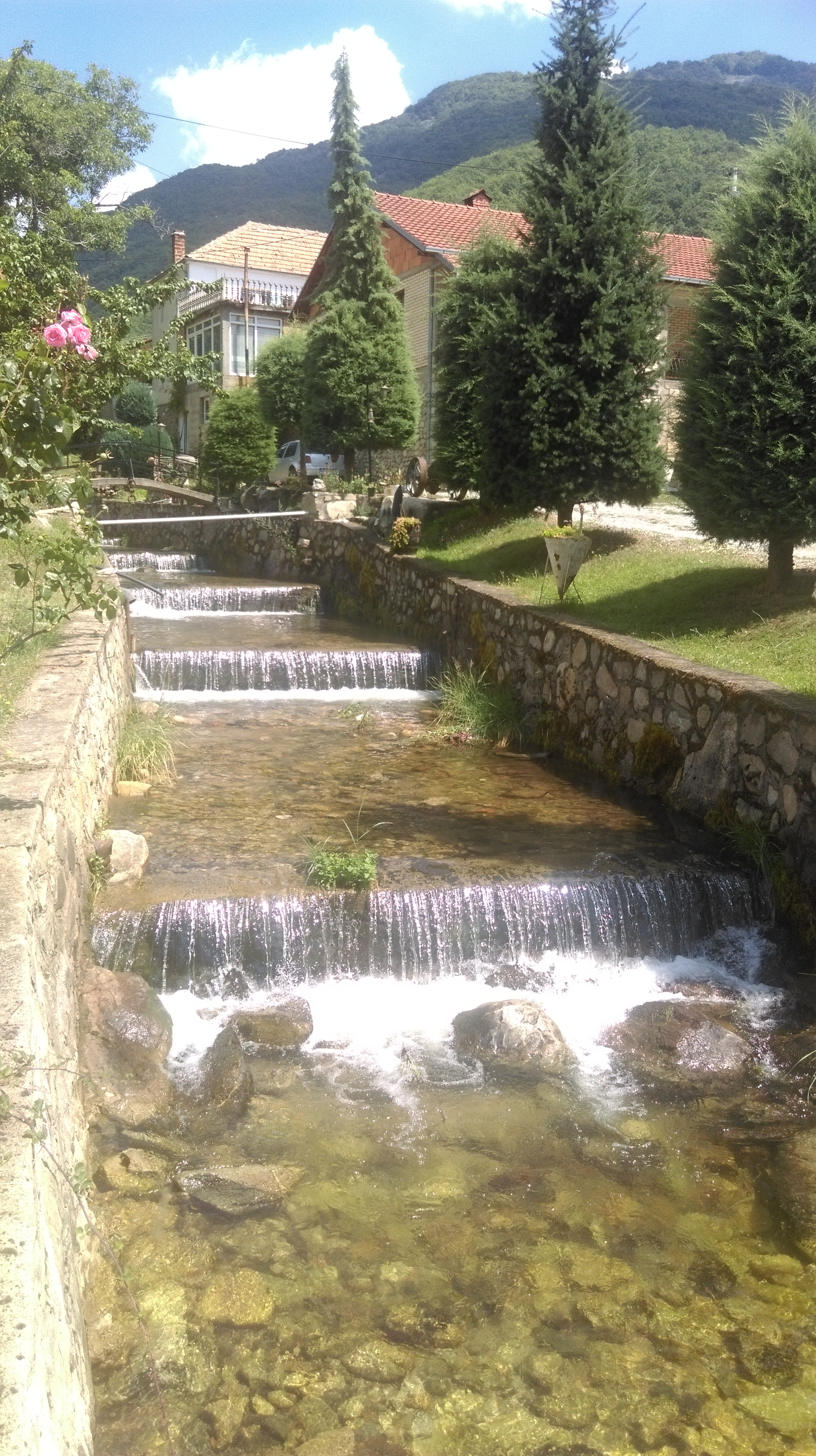
Krani river in Arvati

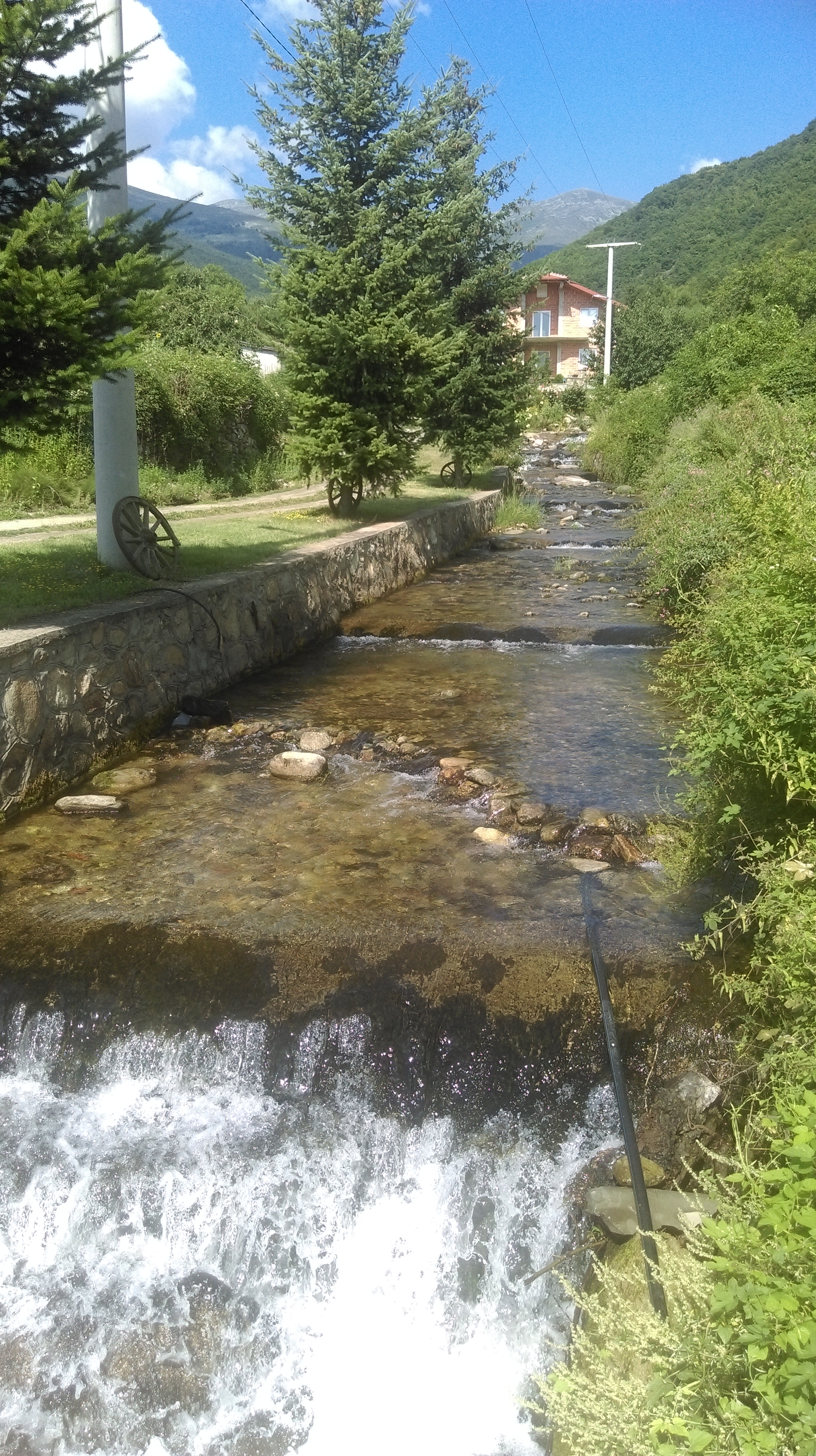
Krani river in Arvati

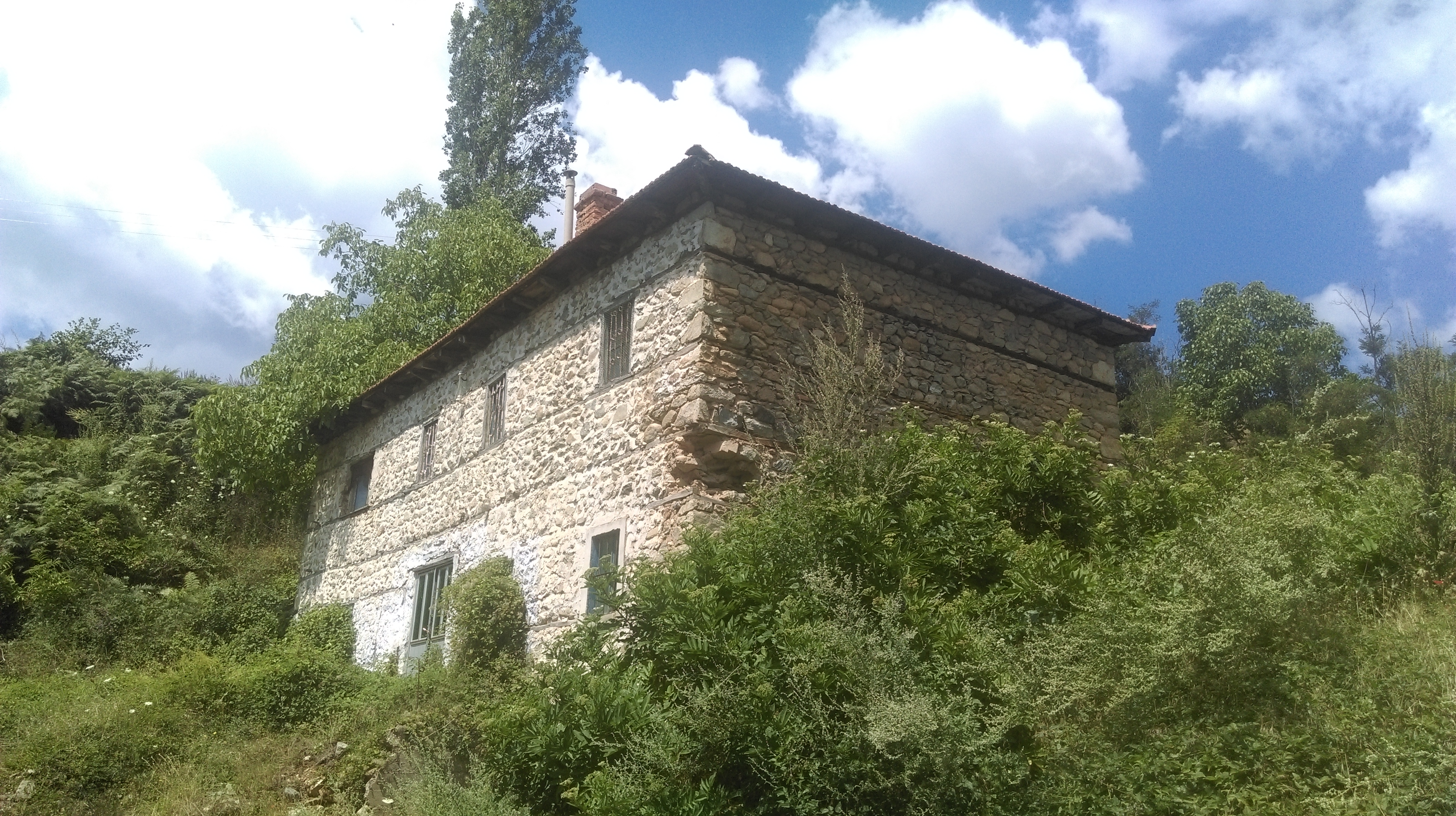
Traditional architecture of Arvati

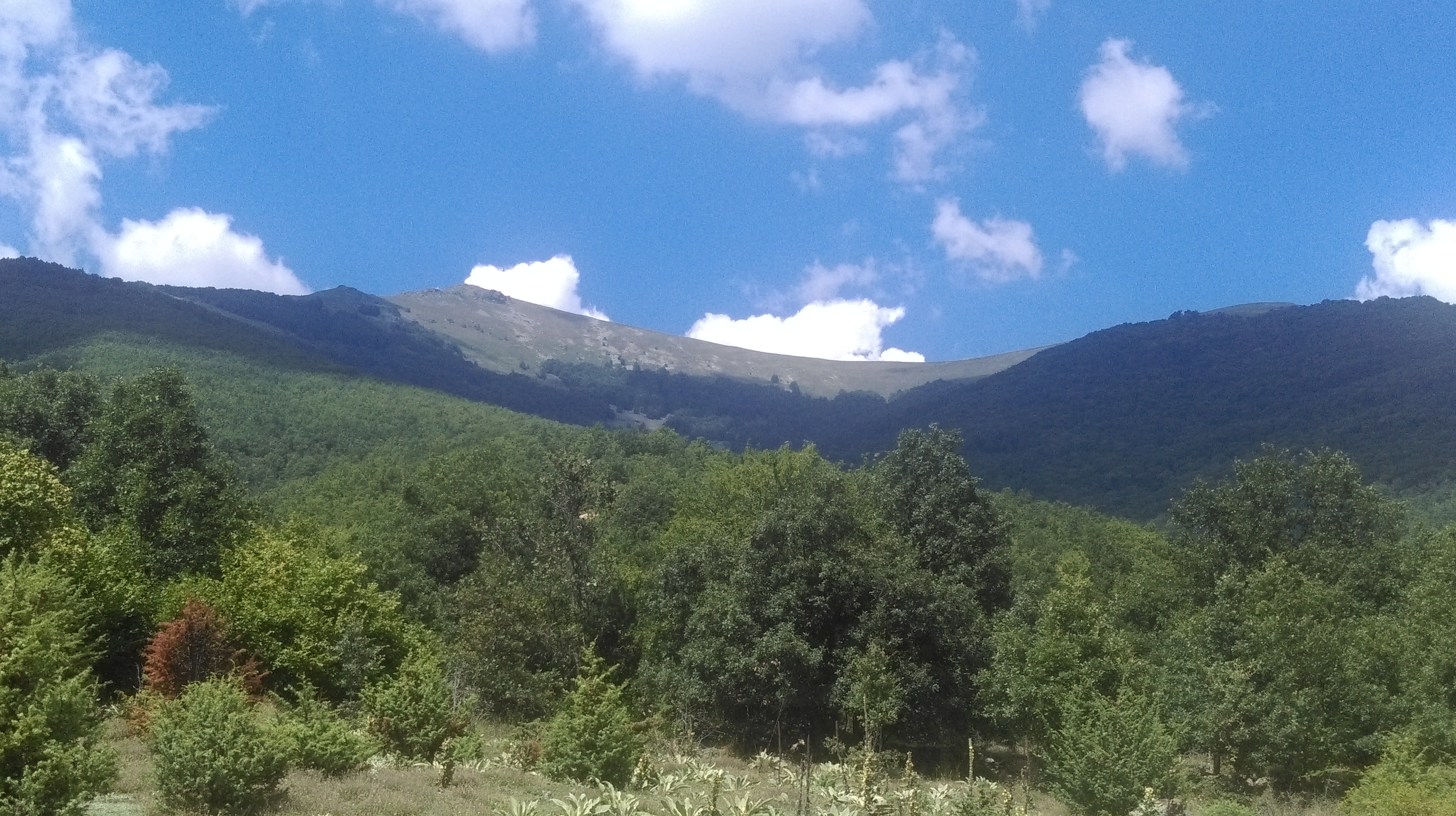
In the fields of Arvati looking out toward Mt Pelister

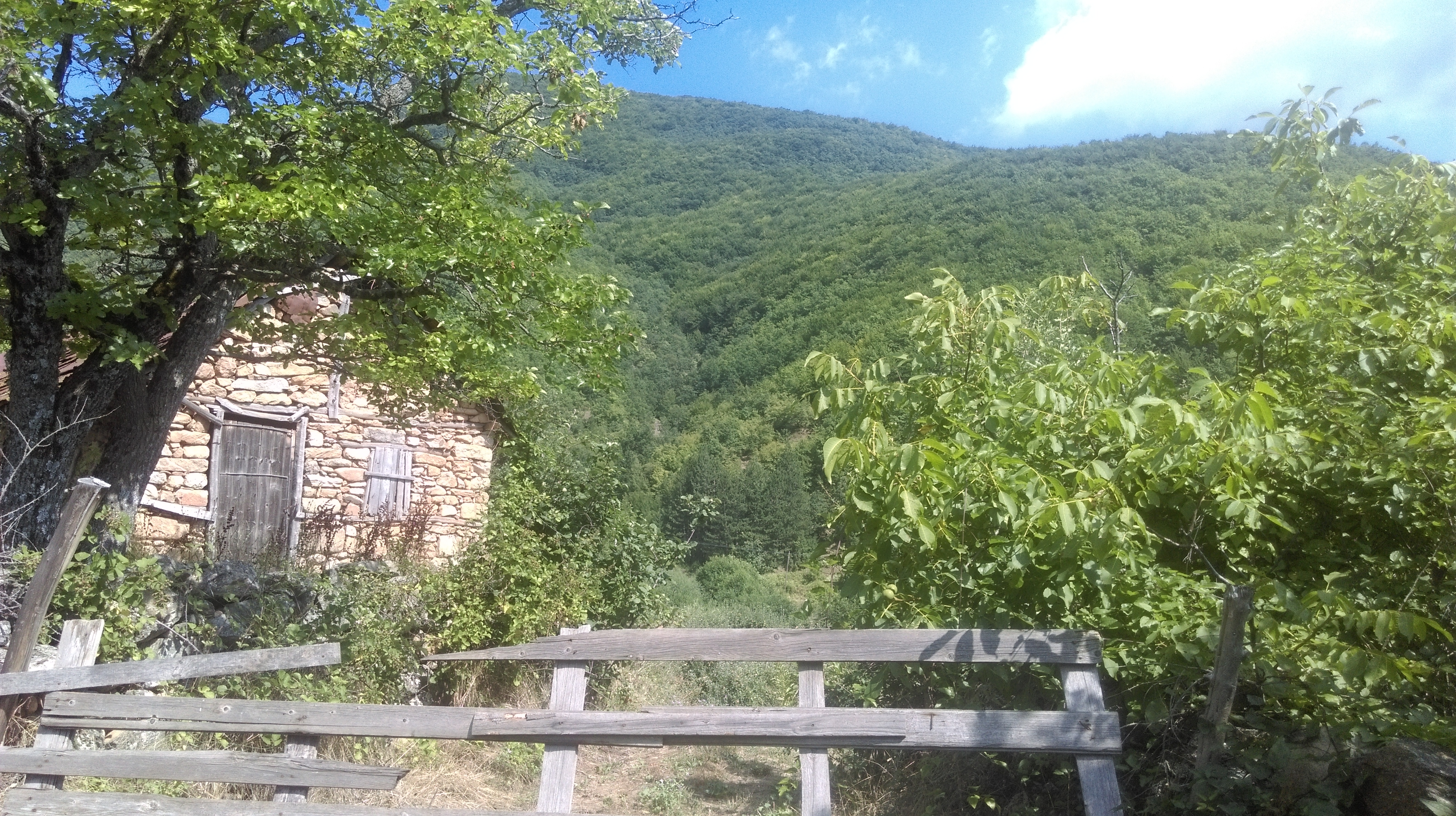
Traditional architecture of Arvati

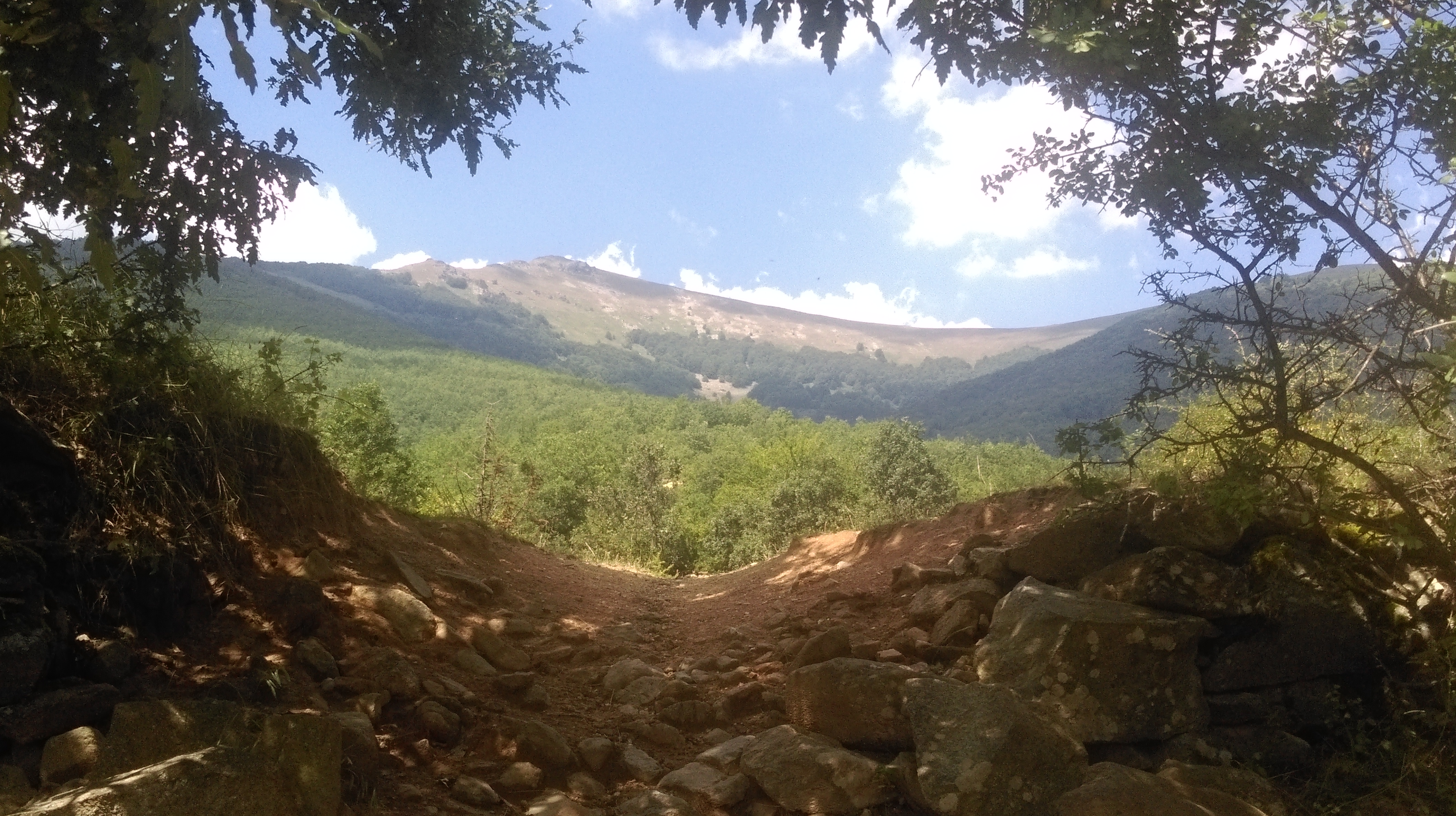
In the fields of Arvati looking out toward Mt Pelister

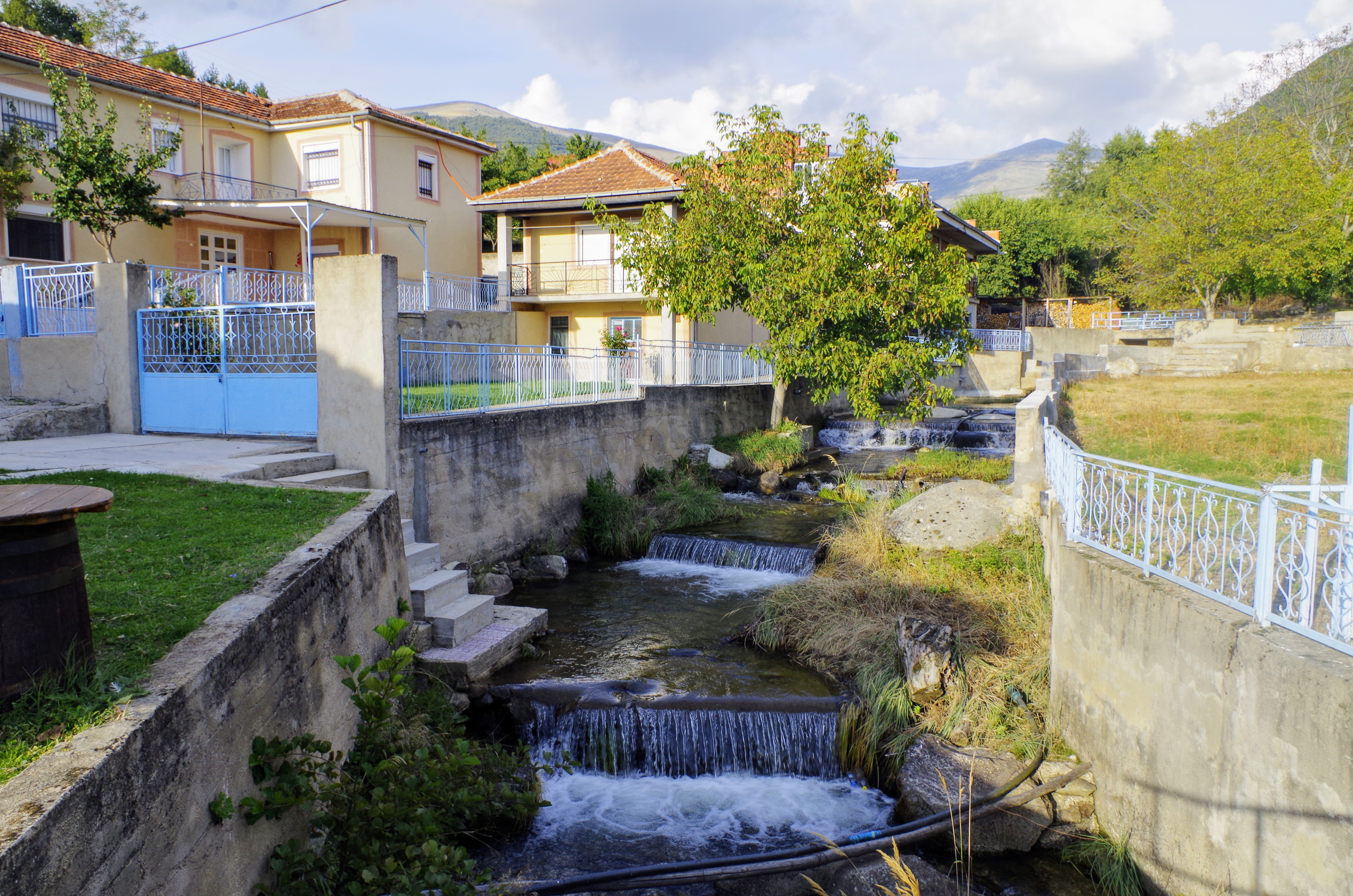
Architecture of Arvati and Krani river

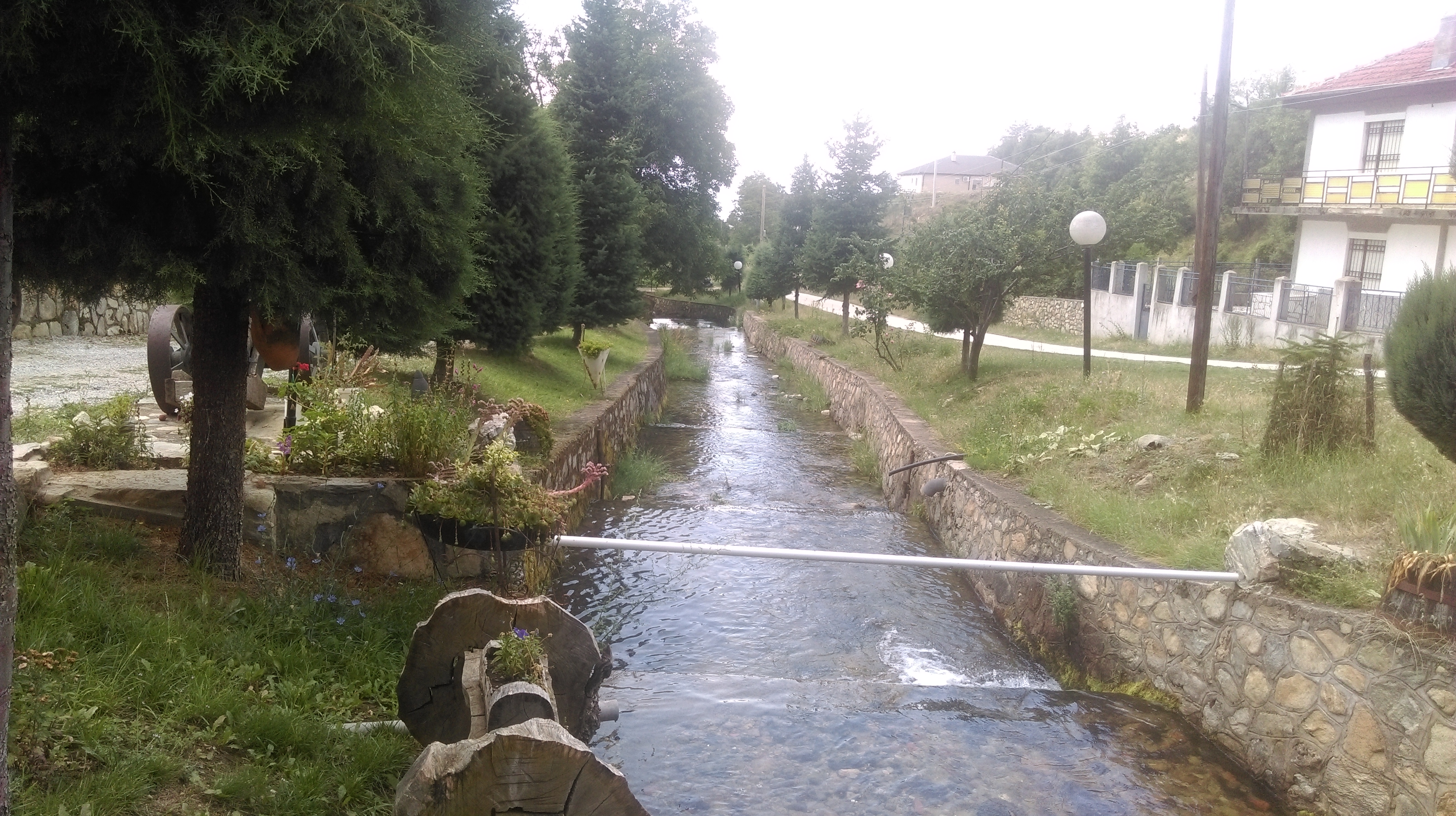
Krani river in Arvati

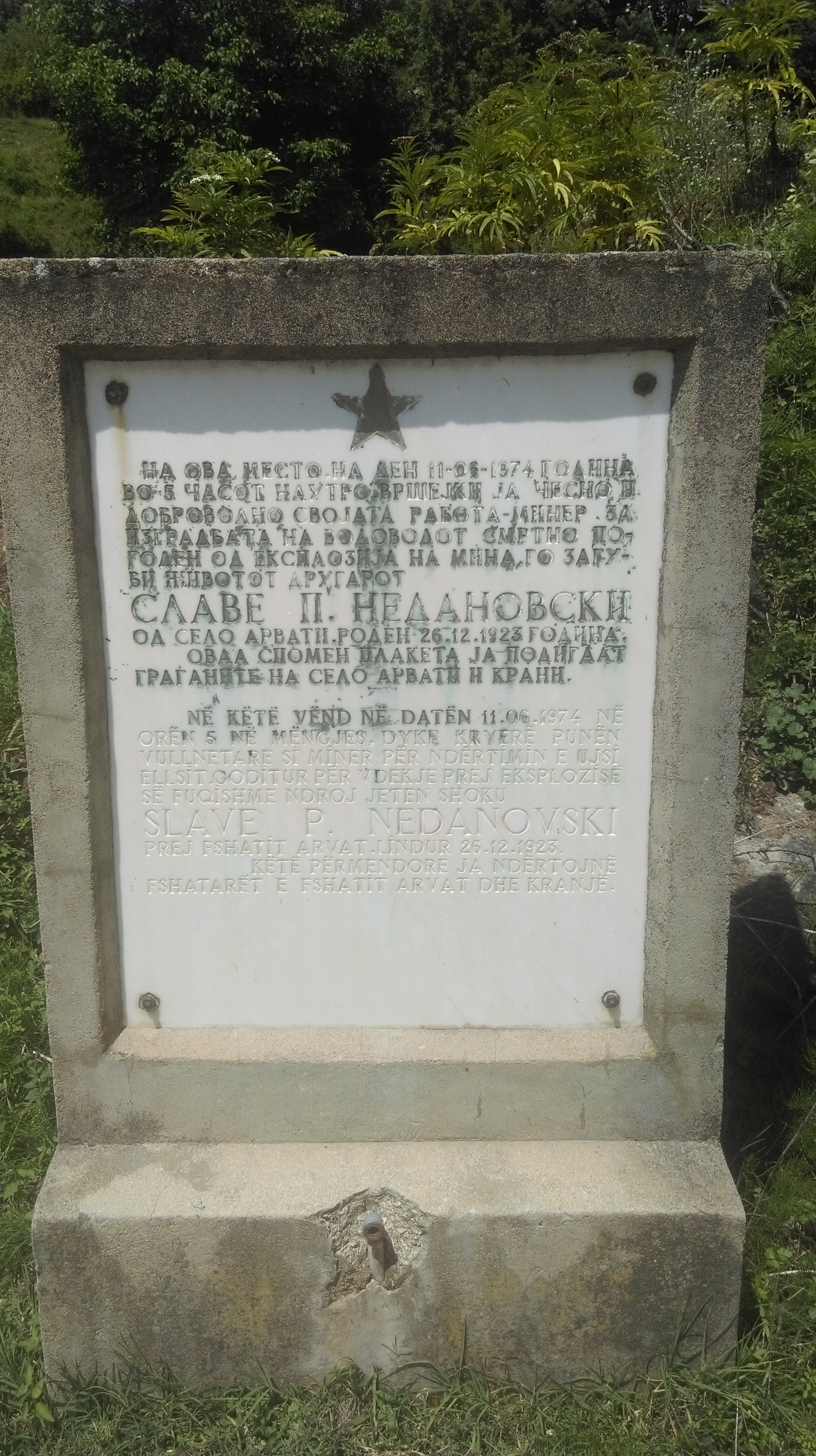
Bilingual Yugoslav era monument to fallen partisan

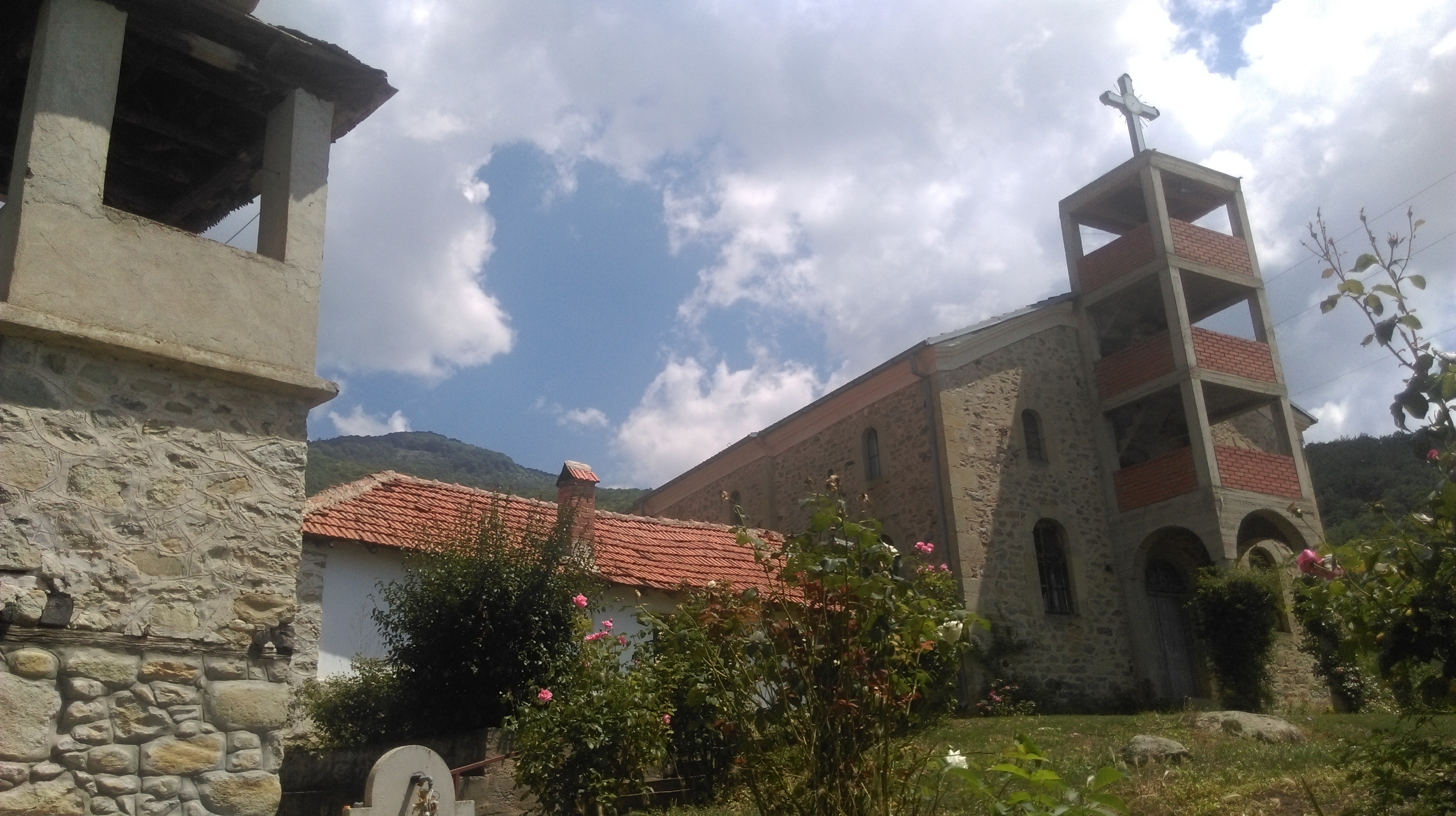
Main Orthodox church of Arvati

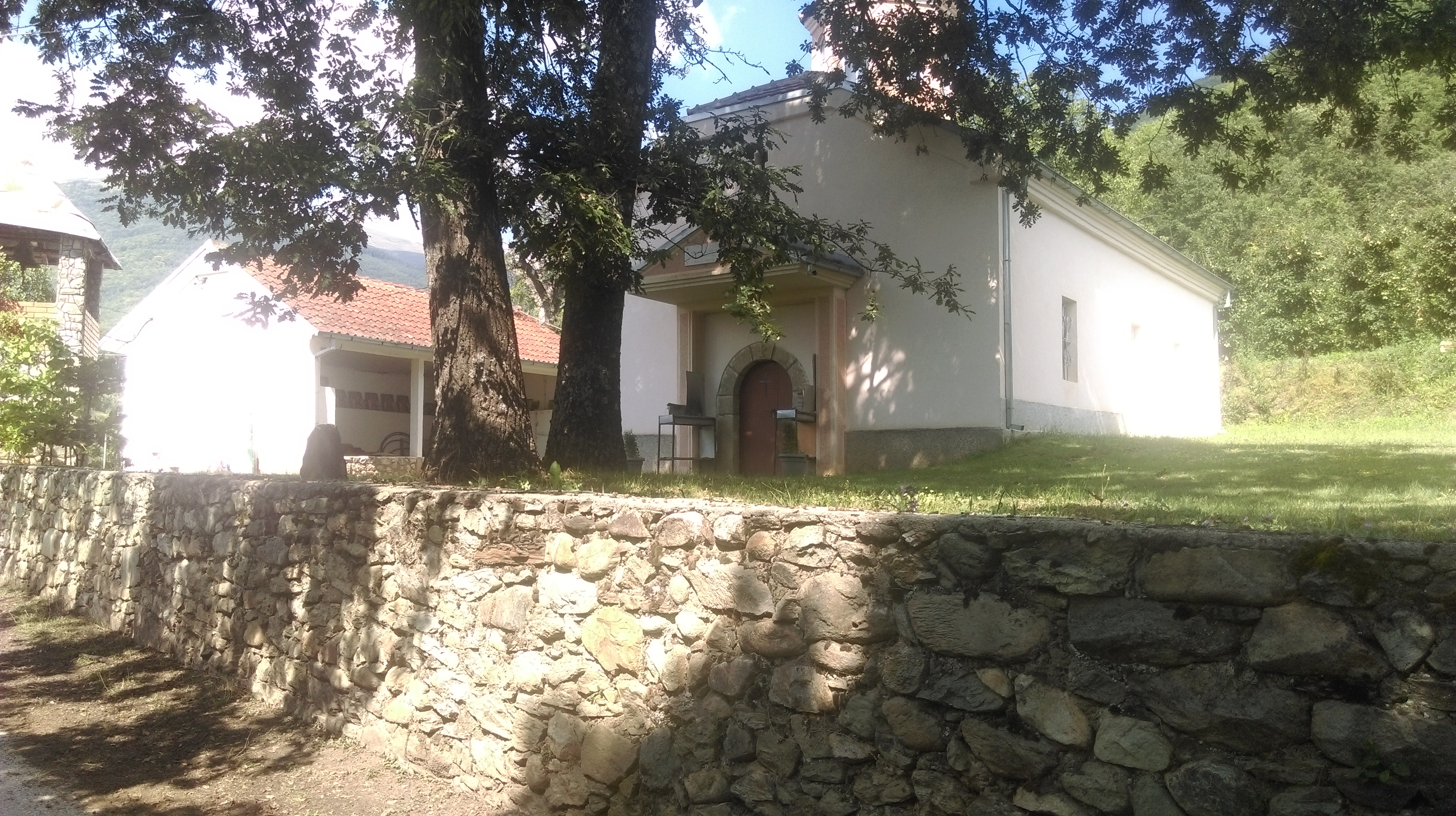
Small Orthodox church in Arvati

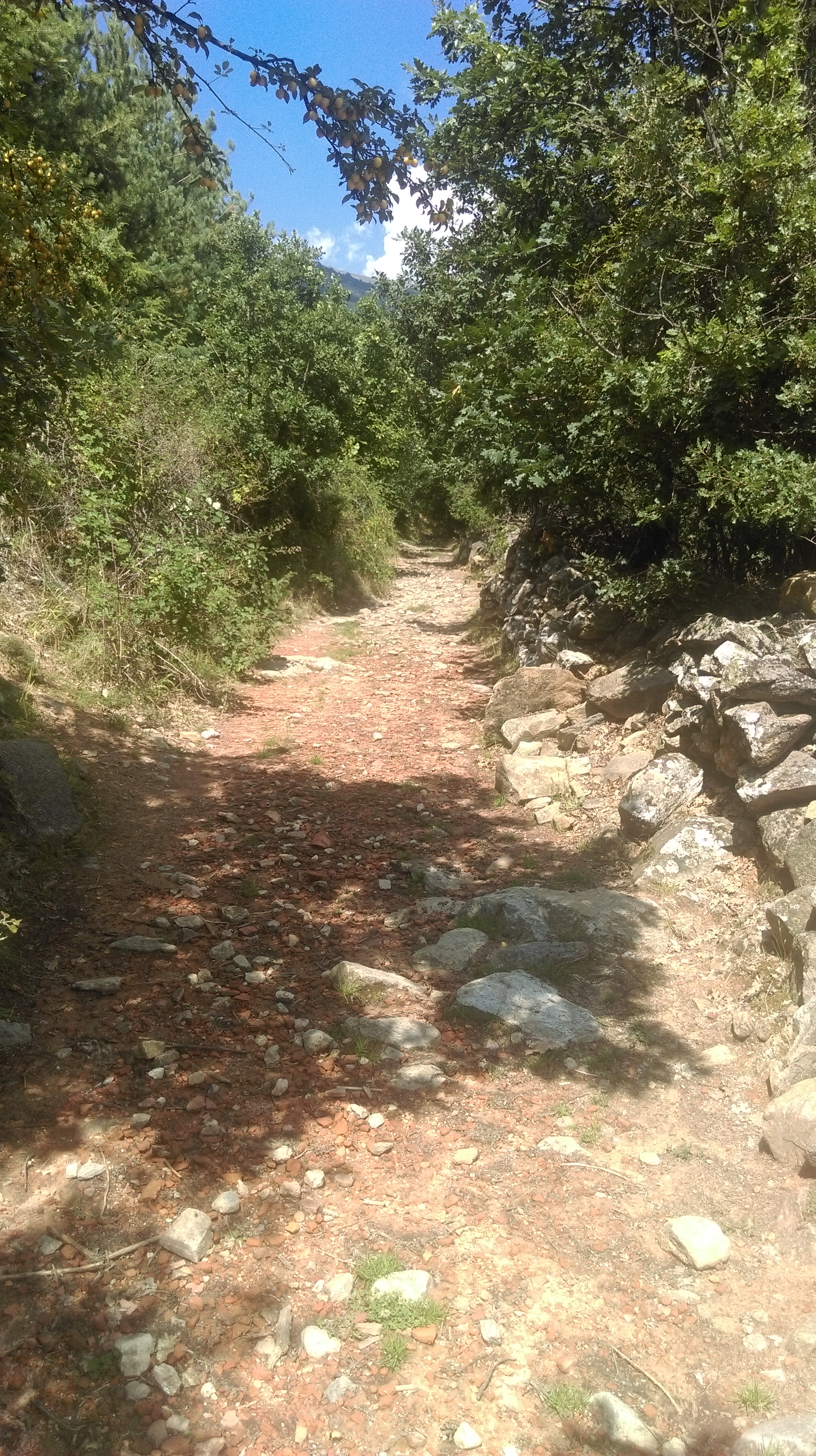
Stony path heading toward fields of Arvati

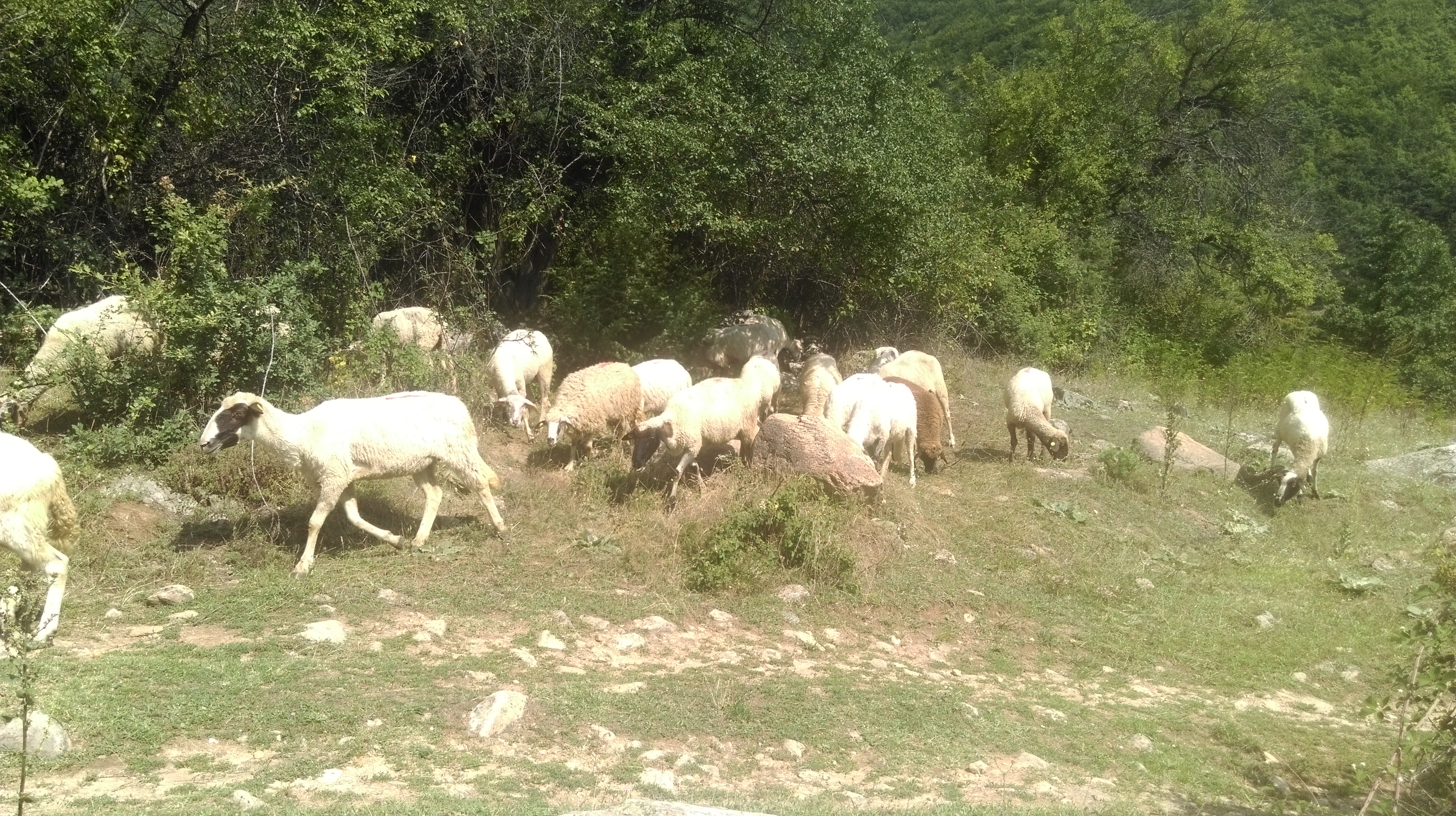
Sheep in Arvati
