= Neurotherapeutics =

Peer-reviewed medical journal

- Discipline: Neurology
- Language: English
- Edited by: Maral Mouradian

Publication details
- History: 2004-present
- Publisher: Elsevier Inc. on behalf of the American Society for Experimental NeuroTherapeutics
- Frequency: Quarterly
- Impact factor: 5.6 (2020)

Standard abbreviations
- ISO 4: Neurotherapeutics

Indexing
- ISSN: 1933-7213 (print); 1878-7479 (web)
- LCCN: 2006215616
- OCLC no.: 82448136

Links
- Journal homepage; Online archive

Neurotherapeutics is a quarterly peer-reviewed medical journal covering research on experimental treatments of neurological disorders. It was established in 2004 and is published by Elsevier Inc. on behalf of the American Society for Experimental NeuroTherapeutics. The editor-in-chief is Maral Mouradian (Robert Wood Johnson Medical School). The founding editor-in-chief was Alan I. Faden (University of Maryland School of Medicine).

== Abstracting and indexing ==
The journal is abstracted and indexed in:

- Science Citation Index Expanded
- Index Medicus/PubMed/MEDLINE
- Scopus
- PsycINFO
- EMBASE
- Chemical Abstracts Service
- EBSCO databases
- Academic OneFile
- Current Contents/Life Sciences
- Current Contents/Clinical Medicine

According to the Journal Citation Reports, the journal has a 2020 impact factor of 7.620.
