= University of Ioannina =

Public university in Greece

Coordinates: 39°37′03″N 20°50′27″E

- Πανεπιστήμιο Ιωαννίνων
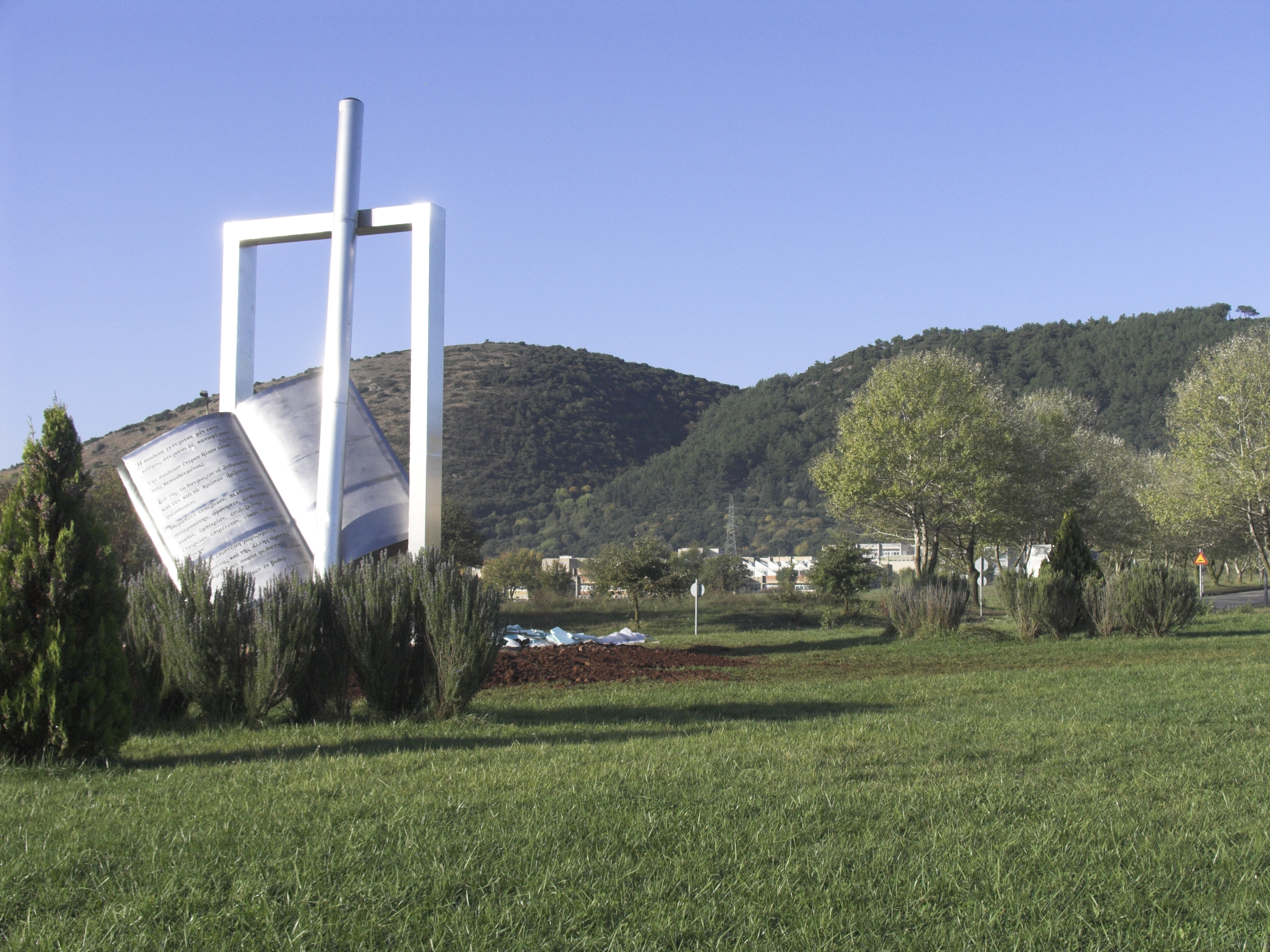
- Seal of the University of Ioannina
- Type: Public higher education institution
- Established: 1964; 62 years ago School of Philosophy; 1970; 56 years ago became independent from the Aristotle University
- Affiliations: Balkan Universities Network EASN
- Chancellor: Batistatou K. Anna
- Vice-Chancellor: Leonardos Ioannis Kanti Panagiota Matikas Theodoros Bitsikas Xenophon
- Total staff: 997
- Students: ~ 33,381 (active)
- Undergraduates: 30,401 (active)
- Postgraduates: 1,328
- Doctoral students: 1,652
- Location: Ioannina, Epirus, Greece
- Campus: 3.4 km²
- Website: uoi.gr/en/

The University of Ioannina (UoI; Greek: Πανεπιστήμιο Ιωαννίνων, Panepistimio Ioanninon) is a public university located in Ioannina, Greece. The university was founded in 1964, as a charter of the Aristotle University of Thessaloniki and became an independent university in 1970.

As of 2017, there is a student population of 25,000 enrolled at the university (21,900 at the undergraduate level and 3,200 at the postgraduate level) and 580 faculty members, while teaching is further supplemented by 171 Teaching Fellows and 132 Technical Laboratory staff. The university Administrative Services are staffed with 420 employees.

== History ==
The efforts for the establishment of a University in Ioannina and in the wider area were apparent in the last years before the revolution. At that time, prominent Epirote intellectuals had attempted to establish University Schools in the Epirus region. Since the 1950s there was a great need for the establishment of a university in the area that would validate the region's cultural significance and history. In 1962 a committee was established in Athens under the name "Central Committee for the establishment of a University in Ioannina" that fought for the particular goal. In a proclamation that they published in July 1962, they called for every citizen in the region to also fight for the cause.

The change of government, which took place in 1964, passed a new law that changed the organization and administration of the faculties of the University of Ioannina. Within the framework of the educational reform, on May 8, 1964, the establishment of a Department of Philosophy in Ioannina was announced by the daily press, as a branch of the Aristotle University of Thessaloniki. The department was founded and started its operation in the academic year 1964-65 with two hundred students.

== Campus ==
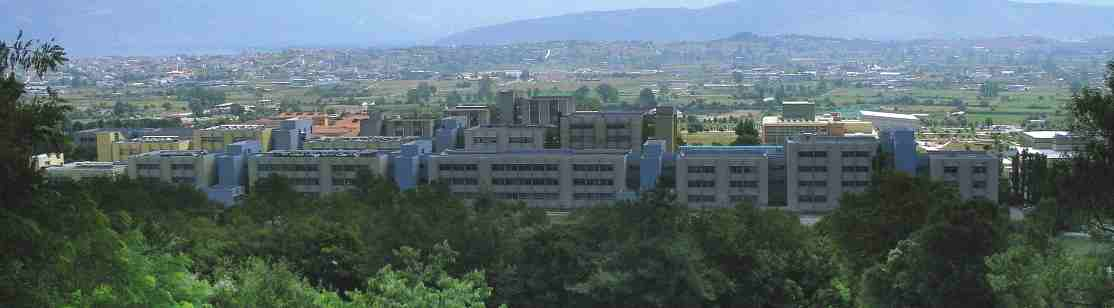
Buildings of the university

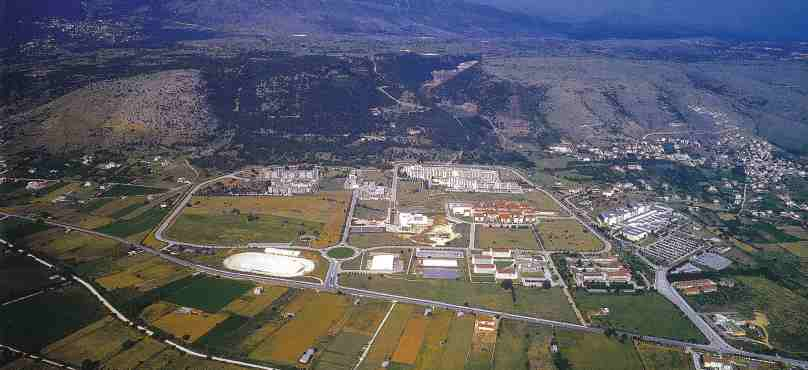
Aerial view of the campus

The campus is located 6 km (3.7 mi) from the centre of Ioannina and is one of the largest university campuses in Greece. It is linked to the town by Greek National Road 5 and can be reached from the city either by public transport or by car.

It covers an area of almost 850 acres (3.4 km^{2}) with many open green spaces which surround the four main building complexes.

The buildings cover an area of 170,000 m^{2} (1,800,000 sq ft), consisting of lecture halls, offices, laboratories, libraries, amphitheaters, etc. Large classes are held in auditoriums, while scientific meetings and exhibitions are held in the Conference Centre located in the Medical Sciences complex.

Two buildings, the Student Residence Halls, accommodate students. Both buildings are close to the Student Union building, a multi-purpose building that houses the student restaurant and a large Hall of Ceremonies together with "Phegos", a restaurant where academics and visitors can dine or celebrate on special occasions, such as graduation day.

One of the buildings on campus is the Monastery of Dourouti, an 18th-century building, which is currently being renovated to serve as a guest house for visitors to the university.

== Schools and departments ==
As of 2017, the University of Ioannina consists of seven schools and fifteen departments.

Schools	Departments
School of Philosophy (founded 1964)	Department of Philology (founded 1984); Department of History and Archaeology (founded 1984); Department of Philosophy (founded 1984)
School of Sciences (founded 1983)	Department of Mathematics (founded 1966); Department of Physics (founded 1971); Department of Chemistry (founded 1977)
School of Health Sciences (founded 2013)	Department of Medicine (founded 1977); Department of Biological Applications and Technology (founded 2000); Department of Nursing (founded 1984); Department of Speech and Language Therapy (founded 2018)
School of Engineering (founded 2017)	Department of Computer Science and Engineering (founded 1993); Department of Architecture (founded 2015); Department of Materials Science and Engineering (founded 1999)
School of Education (founded 1995)	Department of Primary Education (founded 1984); Department of Early Childhood Education (founded 1987)
School of Economics and Administrative Sciences (founded 2018)	Department of Economics (founded 1998); Department of Accounting and Finance (founded 2013)
School of Fine Arts (founded 2013)	Department of Fine Arts and Art Sciences (founded 2000)
School of Social Sciences (founded 2018)	Department of Psychology (founded 2019); Department of Early Years Learning & Care (founded 2018)
School of Agricultural Technology (founded 2018)	Department of Agriculture (founded 2018)
School of Music Studies (founded 2018)	Department of Music Studies (founded 2018)
School of Informatics and Telecommunications (founded 2018)	Department of Informatics and Telecommunications (founded 2018)

== Academic rankings ==
The University is ranked 501st-600th in The Times Higher Education (THE) annual list.

According to the 2017 Leiden rankings the University of Ioannina is ranked #2 overall in Greece.

According to the 2014 Leiden ranking of Greek Universities, the University of Ioannina is ranked #1 in Medicine and Life Sciences, #2 in Physics, #2 in Mathematics, #2 in Computer Science, #3 in Earth Sciences and #2 overall.

According to 2010 rankings published in Springer's journal Scientometrics, the Physics department at the University of Ioannina is ranked #2 in Greece, the Material Science department #3, and the Chemistry department #4.

== Research institutes ==
Research indicators refer to any work published by the University of Ioannina on all scientific disciplines and to research projects launched through the UoI Special Research Fund.

=== Ioannina Biomedical Research Institute ===
The Biomedical Research Institute (BRI) was founded in 1998. It operated as an autonomous institute until 2001, under the name Ioannina Biomedical Research Institute (IBRI).

From September 2001, the institute was merged with the Foundation for Research and Technology-Hellas (FORTH), and its new name is Foundation for Research and Technology-Hellas/Biomedical Research Institute.

BRI has three research directions: Molecular Medicine, Biomedical Technology, and Molecular Epidemiology. In order to fulfill the research aims the institute has established collaborations with the Medical School of the University of Ioannina, as well as with other departments of the university, the University Hospital, and the other institutes of FORTH.

=== Institute of Transportation & Telecommunications ===
The University of Ioannina has allied with the regional local authorities and industrial partners to establish an Institute of Transportation & Telecommunication in Igoumenitsa.

== University Library and Information Centre ==
The University of Ioannina has the largest, in terms of effective surface area (14,500 sq. m. divided into six storeys), single library in Greece, which has been named the University of Ioannina Library and Information Centre.

The equipment of the library includes 31 workstations, 504 reading stations, a 120-seat auditorium, an Art Gallery Exhibition Room, a Seminar Room with a seating capacity of 20 people, and 12 carrels.

Library users include all members of the academic community of the university and the public.

The library covers the fields of: Medicine, Chemistry, Physics, Biological Applications and Technologies, Materials Science and Engineering, Economics, Computer Science, Plastic Arts and Art Sciences, Primary and Pre-School Education, Philosophy, Education, and Psychology.

== Student life ==
The university numbers today more than 25,000 students. Among them, there are approximately 21,900 undergraduate students. A number of organised postgraduate study programmes are on offer that combine taught and research elements both at Master's and Doctoral level. Approximately 1,500 students are involved in full-time study mode progressing to a master's degree, while more than 1,700 students are pursuing their studies at Doctoral level.

=== Catering ===
The Student Refectory provides meals to all undergraduate and postgraduate students on a full-board (breakfast, lunch, dinner) daily basis. The refectory is located on campus and covers an area of 4,500 sq. m.

=== Accommodation ===
The Halls house almost 650 students on two sites, while a number of rooms have been adapted for disabled students. All accommodation is mixed, with a number of standard rooms (with shared bathroom facilities) or en suite rooms. The majority of rooms are single study-bedrooms although there are some shared rooms (two or three people).

Certain residences are reserved mainly for exchange students (i.e. Erasmus).

== Erasmus programme ==
The University of Ioannina has exchange agreements with universities in mainland Europe through the Erasmus+ programme of the European Commission. The University of Ioannina welcomes foreign students who wish to expand their academic horizons by spending a semester or a year studying in Ioannina.

== See also ==
- List of universities in Greece
- Aristotle University of Thessaloniki
- Balkan Universities Network
