= 2012 UEFA European Under-19 Championship squads =

Player listings in youth football competition

This article will display the squads for the 2012 UEFA European Under-19 Championship. Only players born on or after 1 January 1993 are eligible to play.

Every team had to submit a list of 18 players. Two of them must be goalkeepers.

Age, caps and goals are as of the start of the tournament, 3 July 2012.

Players in bold have later been capped at full international level.

== Group A ==
=== Estonia ===
Head coach: Arno Pijpers

Arno Pijpers named his final 18-man squad on 30 June 2012.

No.	Pos.	Player	Date of birth (age)	Caps	Goals	Club
1	GK	Vadim Gurnik	25 April 1993 (aged 19)	8	0	(Estonian Football Association) Flora
2	DF	Johannes Kukebal	19 July 1993 (aged 18)	12	0	(Estonian Football Association) Kalev Tallinn
3	DF	Kevin Ingermann	6 July 1993 (aged 18)	14	0	(Estonian Football Association) Levadia
4	DF	**Karol Mets**	16 May 1993 (aged 19)	28	0	(Estonian Football Association) Flora
5	DF	**Artur Pikk**	5 March 1993 (aged 19)	11	0	(Estonian Football Association) Levadia
6	MF	Bert Klemmer	15 October 1993 (aged 18)	22	0	(Estonian Football Association) Viljandi
7	FW	**Hannes Anier**	16 January 1993 (aged 19)	10	4	(Danish Football Association) OB
8	MF	**Andreas Raudsepp**	13 December 1993 (aged 18)	25	0	(Estonian Football Association) Levadia
9	FW	Artur Rättel	8 February 1993 (aged 19)	17	3	(Estonian Football Association) Levadia
10	MF	**Brent Lepistu**	26 March 1993 (aged 19)	9	0	(Estonian Football Association) Flora
11	MF	Karl-Eerik Luigend	15 January 1993 (aged 19)	28	2	(Estonian Football Association) Flora
12	GK	Riido Reiman	19 February 1994 (aged 18)	4	0	(Estonian Football Association) Sörve
14	DF	Martin Kase	2 September 1993 (aged 18)	5	1	(Estonian Football Association) Kalev Tallinn
15	DF	Märten Pajunurm	29 April 1993 (aged 19)	10	0	(Estonian Football Association) Kuressaare
16	DF	Mikk Metsa	19 March 1993 (aged 19)	13	0	(Estonian Football Association) Viljandi
17	FW	Juri Gavrilov	11 May 1993 (aged 19)	10	1	(Estonian Football Association) Flora
18	MF	Martin Ustaal	6 February 1993 (aged 19)	22	0	(Estonian Football Association) Levadia
20	MF	Nikita Martõnov	4 September 1993 (aged 18)	7	0	(Estonian Football Association) Levadia

=== Greece ===
Head coach: Kostas Tsanas

Kostas Tsanas named his final 18-man squad on 21 June 2012.

No.	Pos.	Player	Date of birth (age)	Caps	Goals	Club
1	GK	**Stefanos Kapino**	18 March 1994 (aged 18)			(Hellenic Football Federation) Panathinaikos
2	DF	Nikos Marinakis	12 September 1993 (aged 18)			(Hellenic Football Federation) Panathinaikos
3	DF	**Kostas Stafylidis**	2 December 1993 (aged 18)			(Hellenic Football Federation) PAOK
4	DF	Mavroudis Bougaidis	1 June 1993 (aged 19)			(Hellenic Football Federation) AEK Athens
5	DF	Kostas Triantafyllopoulos	3 April 1993 (aged 19)			(Hellenic Football Federation) Panathinaikos
6	MF	Panagiotis Ballas	6 September 1993 (aged 18)			(Hellenic Football Federation) Atromitos
7	MF	**Charalampos Mavrias**	21 February 1994 (aged 18)			(Hellenic Football Federation) Panathinaikos
8	MF	Spyros Fourlanos	19 November 1993 (aged 18)			(Hellenic Football Federation) Panathinaikos
9	FW	**Dimitrios Diamantakos**	5 March 1993 (aged 19)			(Hellenic Football Federation) Olympiacos
10	MF	Giorgos Katidis	12 February 1993 (aged 19)			(Hellenic Football Federation) Aris
11	FW	**Giannis Gianniotas**	4 May 1993 (aged 19)			(Hellenic Football Federation) Aris
12	GK	Sokratis Dioudis	3 February 1993 (aged 19)			(Hellenic Football Federation) Aris
13	MF	Konstantinos Rougalas	13 October 1993 (aged 18)			(Hellenic Football Federation) Olympiacos
14	DF	**Charis Lykogiannis**	22 October 1993 (aged 18)			(Hellenic Football Federation) Olympiacos
15	MF	**Dimitrios Kourbelis**	2 November 1993 (aged 18)			(Hellenic Football Federation) Asteras Tripolis
16	MF	Vasilis Bouzas	30 June 1993 (aged 19)			(Hellenic Football Federation) Panionios
17	FW	**Anastasios Bakasetas**	28 June 1993 (aged 19)			(Hellenic Football Federation) Asteras Tripolis
18	MF	**Andreas Bouchalakis**	5 April 1993 (aged 19)			(Hellenic Football Federation) Ergotelis

=== Portugal ===
Head coach: Edgar Borges

Edgar Borges named his final 18-man squad on 11 June 2012. On 17 June, André Teixeira replaced Edgar Ié after Ié fractured his fifth metatarsal on his left foot.

No.	Pos.	Player	Date of birth (age)	Caps	Goals	Club
1	GK	Rafael Veloso	3 November 1993 (aged 18)	11	0	(Portuguese Football Federation) Sporting CP
2	DF	Pedro Almeida	5 April 1993 (aged 19)	9	0	(Portuguese Football Federation) União de Leiria
3	DF	Tiago Ferreira	10 July 1993 (aged 18)	15	2	(Portuguese Football Federation) Porto
4	DF	Tiago Ilori	26 February 1993 (aged 19)	12	1	(Portuguese Football Federation) Sporting CP
5	DF	Daniel Martins	23 June 1993 (aged 19)	14	0	(Portuguese Football Federation) Benfica
6	MF	Agostinho Cá	24 July 1993 (aged 18)	19	2	(Portuguese Football Federation) Sporting CP
7	FW	**Bruma**	24 October 1994 (aged 17)	24	4	(Portuguese Football Federation) Sporting CP
8	MF	**João Mário**	19 January 1993 (aged 19)	14	1	(Portuguese Football Federation) Sporting CP
9	FW	Betinho	21 July 1993 (aged 18)	17	12	(Portuguese Football Federation) Sporting CP
10	DF	Ricardo Esgaio	16 May 1993 (aged 19)	26	5	(Portuguese Football Federation) Sporting CP
11	FW	**Ivan Cavaleiro**	18 October 1993 (aged 18)	19	5	(Portuguese Football Federation) Benfica
12	GK	Bruno Varela	4 November 1994 (aged 17)	1	0	(Portuguese Football Federation) Benfica
13	DF	**João Cancelo**	27 May 1994 (aged 18)	8	0	(Portuguese Football Federation) Benfica
14	DF	André Teixeira	14 August 1993 (aged 18)	9	0	(Portuguese Football Federation) Porto
15	MF	**André Gomes**	30 July 1993 (aged 18)	6	1	(Portuguese Football Federation) Benfica
16	MF	Ricardo Alves	25 March 1993 (aged 19)	11	3	(Portuguese Football Federation) Porto
17	MF	Tozé	14 January 1993 (aged 19)	14	4	(Portuguese Football Federation) Porto
18	FW	Cafú	26 February 1993 (aged 19)	12	5	(Portuguese Football Federation) Benfica

=== Spain ===
Head coach: Julen Lopetegui

Julen Lopetegui named his final 18-man squad on 28 June 2012.

No.	Pos.	Player	Date of birth (age)	Caps	Goals	Club
1	GK	**Kepa Arrizabalaga**	3 October 1994 (aged 17)	2	0	(Royal Spanish Football Federation) Athletic Bilbao
2	DF	Javier Manquillo	5 May 1994 (aged 18)	2	0	(Royal Spanish Football Federation) Atlético Madrid
3	DF	**Álex Grimaldo**	20 September 1995 (aged 16)	2	0	(Royal Spanish Football Federation) Barcelona
4	MF	**Jonás Ramalho**	10 June 1993 (aged 19)	7	0	(Royal Spanish Football Federation) Athletic Bilbao
5	DF	Derik	21 February 1993 (aged 19)	4	0	(Royal Spanish Football Federation) Real Madrid
6	MF	**José Campaña**	31 May 1993 (aged 19)	9	1	(Royal Spanish Football Federation) Sevilla
7	FW	**Juanmi** (captain)	20 May 1993 (aged 19)	15	8	(Royal Spanish Football Federation) Málaga
8	FW	**Suso**	19 November 1993 (aged 18)	4	1	(The Football Association) Liverpool
9	FW	**Paco Alcácer**	30 August 1993 (aged 18)	12	5	(Royal Spanish Football Federation) Valencia
10	FW	Jesé	26 February 1993 (aged 19)	7	1	(Royal Spanish Football Federation) Real Madrid
11	MF	**Juan Bernat**	1 March 1993 (aged 19)	3	0	(Royal Spanish Football Federation) Valencia
12	DF	**Jonny**	3 March 1994 (aged 18)	4	0	(Royal Spanish Football Federation) Celta Vigo
13	GK	Adrián Ortolá	20 August 1993 (aged 18)	3	0	(Royal Spanish Football Federation) Villarreal
14	DF	Pablo Insua	9 September 1993 (aged 18)	4	0	(Royal Spanish Football Federation) Deportivo La Coruña
15	MF	**Saúl**	21 November 1994 (aged 17)	6	0	(Royal Spanish Football Federation) Atlético Madrid
16	MF	Óliver Torres	10 November 1994 (aged 17)	5	0	(Royal Spanish Football Federation) Atlético Madrid
17	FW	**Gerard Deulofeu**	13 March 1994 (aged 18)	14	3	(Royal Spanish Football Federation) Barcelona
18	MF	**Denis Suárez**	6 January 1994 (aged 18)	4	2	(The Football Association) Manchester City
19	DF	Salva Ruiz^{1}	17 May 1995 (aged 17)	0	0	(Royal Spanish Football Federation) Valencia
20	MF	Nono^{2}	30 March 1993 (aged 19)	6	0	(Royal Spanish Football Federation) Betis

1. Salva Ruiz was called up during the tournament due to an injury to Javier Manquillo.
2. Nono was called up during the tournament due to an injury to Saúl.

== Group B ==
=== Croatia ===
Head coach: Dinko Jeličić

No.	Pos.	Player	Date of birth (age)	Caps	Goals	Club
1	GK	Oliver Zelenika	14 March 1993 (aged 19)	7	0	(Croatian Football Federation) Dinamo Zagreb
2	DF	Toni Gorupec	4 July 1993 (aged 18)	20	0	(Croatian Football Federation) Radnik Sesvete
3	DF	Ivan Aleksić	6 March 1993 (aged 19)	11	0	(Croatian Football Federation) Osijek
4	MF	Filip Mrzljak (c)	16 April 1993 (aged 19)	14	0	(Croatian Football Federation) Lokomotiva
5	DF	**Matej Mitrović**	4 February 1993 (aged 19)	5	1	(Croatian Football Federation) Cibalia
6	DF	Josip Čalušić	11 October 1993 (aged 18)	13	0	(Croatian Football Federation) Radnik Sesvete
7	MF	Marko Pajač	11 May 1993 (aged 19)	10	4	(Croatian Football Federation) Lokomotiva
8	MF	**Ivan Močinić**	30 April 1993 (aged 19)	8	0	(Croatian Football Federation) Rijeka
9	MF	Marko Dugandžić	7 April 1994 (aged 18)	4	5	(Croatian Football Federation) Osijek
10	DF	Domagoj Pavičić	9 March 1994 (aged 18)	2	0	(Croatian Football Federation) Dinamo Zagreb
11	FW	Dejan Čabraja	22 August 1993 (aged 18)	0	0	(Croatian Football Federation) Dinamo Zagreb
12	GK	Simon Sluga	17 March 1993 (aged 19)	6	0	(Croatian Football Federation) Rijeka
13	DF	**Toni Datković**	6 November 1993 (aged 18)	2	0	(Croatian Football Federation) Rijeka
14	FW	**Mato Miloš**	30 June 1993 (aged 19)	5	0	(Croatian Football Federation) Rijeka
15	FW	Danijel Miškić	11 October 1993 (aged 18)	10	1	(Croatian Football Federation) Radnik Sesvete
16	MF	**Hrvoje Miličević**	30 April 1993 (aged 19)	5	0	(Football Association of Bosnia and Herzegovina) Zrinjski Mostar
17	MF	**Antonio-Mirko Čolak**	17 September 1993 (aged 18)	11	6	(German Football Association) 1. FC Nürnberg
18	FW	Mihael Pongračić	24 August 1993 (aged 18)	0	0	(Croatian Football Federation) Osijek
21	GK	Marko Malenica^{1}	8 February 1994 (aged 18)	2	0	(Croatian Football Federation) Osijek

1. Marko Malenica was called up during the tournament due to a knee ligament injury to Oliver Zelenika sustained during a training session.

=== England ===
Head coach: Noel Blake

Noel Blake named his final 18-man squad on 20 June 2012. Tom Thorpe was named the captain for the tournament.

No.	Pos.	Player	Date of birth (age)	Caps	Goals	Club
1	GK	**Sam Johnstone**	25 March 1993 (aged 19)	9	0	(The Football Association) Manchester United
2	DF	**Eric Dier**	15 January 1994 (aged 18)	3	0	(Portuguese Football Federation) Sporting CP
3	DF	Jack Robinson	1 September 1993 (aged 18)	8	1	(The Football Association) Liverpool
4	MF	**Conor Coady**	25 February 1993 (aged 19)	9	0	(The Football Association) Liverpool
5	DF	**Michael Keane**	11 January 1993 (aged 19)	3	0	(The Football Association) Manchester United
6	DF	Tom Thorpe (captain)	13 January 1993 (aged 19)	5	1	(The Football Association) Manchester United
7	MF	**Ross Barkley**	5 December 1993 (aged 18)	9	0	(The Football Association) Everton
8	MF	**Nathaniel Chalobah**	12 December 1994 (aged 17)	8	1	(The Football Association) Chelsea
9	FW	**Saido Berahino**	4 August 1993 (aged 18)	8	3	(The Football Association) West Bromwich Albion
10	MF	**Harry Kane**	28 July 1993 (aged 18)	11	5	(The Football Association) Tottenham Hotspur
11	MF	**Nathan Redmond**	6 March 1994 (aged 18)	1	0	(The Football Association) Birmingham City
12	FW	Robert Hall	20 October 1993 (aged 18)	1	1	(The Football Association) West Ham United
13	GK	Connor Ripley	13 February 1993 (aged 19)	4	0	(The Football Association) Middlesbrough
14	MF	George Thorne	4 January 1993 (aged 19)	16	1	(The Football Association) West Bromwich Albion
15	FW	**Hallam Hope**	17 March 1994 (aged 18)	0	0	(The Football Association) Everton
16	DF	Luke Garbutt	21 May 1993 (aged 19)	3	0	(The Football Association) Everton
17	FW	**Benik Afobe**	12 February 1993 (aged 19)	7	5	(The Football Association) Arsenal
18	MF	John Lundstram	18 February 1994 (aged 18)	2	0	(The Football Association) Everton

=== France ===
Head coach: Pierre Mankowski

No.	Pos.	Player	Date of birth (age)	Caps	Goals	Club
1	GK	**Alphonse Areola**	16 April 1993 (aged 19)	5	0	(French Football Federation) Paris Saint-Germain
2	DF	**Dimitri Foulquier**	23 March 1993 (aged 19)	6	0	(French Football Federation) Rennes
3	DF	Jérôme Phojo	15 April 1993 (aged 19)	7	0	(French Football Federation) Monaco
4	DF	Richard-Quentin Samnick	23 January 1993 (aged 19)	1	0	(French Football Federation) Paris Saint-Germain
5	DF	**Samuel Umtiti**	13 November 1993 (aged 18)	9	0	(French Football Federation) Lyon
6	MF	**Paul Pogba** (captain)	15 March 1993 (aged 19)	9	2	(Italian Football Federation) Juventus
7	MF	**El Hadji Ba**	5 March 1993 (aged 19)	5	0	(French Football Federation) Le Havre
8	MF	**Geoffrey Kondogbia**	15 February 1993 (aged 19)	8	1	(French Football Federation) Lens
9	FW	Thibaut Vion	11 December 1993 (aged 18)	8	2	(Portuguese Football Federation) Porto
10	MF	Axel Ngando	13 July 1993 (aged 18)	11	1	(French Football Federation) Rennes
11	FW	Jean-Christophe Bahebeck	1 May 1993 (aged 19)	8	5	(French Football Federation) Paris Saint-Germain
12	DF	**Lucas Digne**	20 July 1993 (aged 18)	9	1	(French Football Federation) Lille
13	DF	Vincent Di Stefano	4 March 1993 (aged 19)	5	0	(French Football Federation) Montpellier
14	FW	**Alassane Pléa**	10 March 1993 (aged 19)	11	2	(French Football Federation) Lyon
15	FW	Alexy Bosetti	23 April 1993 (aged 19)	3	3	(French Football Federation) Nice
16	GK	Jonathan Millieras	19 May 1993 (aged 19)	6	0	(French Football Federation) Châteauroux
17	MF	**Jordan Veretout**	1 March 1993 (aged 19)	8	0	(French Football Federation) Nantes
18	MF	**Kévin Mayi**	14 January 1993 (aged 19)	1	0	(French Football Federation) Saint-Étienne

=== Serbia ===
Head coach: Zoran Marić

No.	Pos.	Player	Date of birth (age)	Caps	Goals	Club
1	GK	Filip Pajović	30 July 1993 (aged 18)	5	0	(Hungarian Football Federation) Videoton
2	DF	**Filip Stojković**	22 January 1993 (aged 19)	4	0	(Football Association of Serbia) Red Star
3	MF	Ivan Petrović	3 July 1993 (aged 19)	3	0	(Football Association of Serbia) Radnički Kragujevac
4	MF	**Srđan Mijailović**	10 November 1993 (aged 18)	4	0	(Football Association of Serbia) Red Star
5	DF	**Uroš Spajić**	13 February 1993 (aged 19)	4	0	(Football Association of Serbia) Red Star
6	DF	Lazar Rosić	29 June 1993 (aged 19)	0	0	(Football Association of Serbia) Radnički Kragujevac
7	FW	Stefan Dimić	1 May 1993 (aged 19)	5	0	(Football Association of Serbia) Rad
8	MF	**Marko Poletanović**	20 July 1993 (aged 18)	5	0	(Football Association of Serbia) Vojvodina
9	MF	**Uroš Đurđević**	2 March 1994 (aged 18)	2	0	(Football Association of Serbia) Rad
10	FW	Marko Pavlovski	7 February 1994 (aged 18)	3	0	(Football Association of Serbia) OFK Beograd
11	DF	Nikola Ninković	19 December 1994 (aged 17)	2	1	(Football Association of Serbia) Partizan
12	GK	Miroslav Grujičić	17 June 1994 (aged 18)	0	0	(Football Association of Serbia) BSK Borča
13	DF	Boris Varga	14 August 1993 (aged 18)	0	0	(Football Association of Serbia) Hajduk Kula
14	FW	**Aleksandar Mitrović**	16 September 1994 (aged 17)	5	2	(Football Association of Serbia) Partizan
15	DF	**Nemanja Radoja**	6 February 1993 (aged 19)	5	0	(Football Association of Serbia) Vojvodina
16	MF	Saša Ivković	13 May 1993 (aged 19)	4	0	(Football Association of Serbia) Teleoptik
17	FW	Aleksandar Čavrić	18 May 1994 (aged 18)	5	0	(Football Association of Serbia) OFK Beograd
18	MF	Đorđe Radovanović	6 May 1993 (aged 19)	2	0	(Portuguese Football Federation) Nacional

== Player representation ==
=== By club ===
Players	Clubs
8	(Portugal) Sporting CP
6	(Portugal) Benfica
5	(Estonia) Flora, (Estonia) Levadia, (Greece) Panathinaikos, (Portugal) Porto
4	(England) Everton, (Croatia) Rijeka
3	(Greece) Aris, (Spain) Atlético Madrid, (Croatia) Dinamo Zagreb, (England) Liverpool, (Greece) Olympiacos, (Croatia) Osijek, (France) Paris Saint-Germain, (England) Manchester United, (Serbia) Red Star, (Croatia) Radnik Sesvete
2	(Greece) Asteras Tripolis, (Spain) Athletic Bilbao, (Spain) Barcelona, (Serbia) OFK Beograd, (Estonia) Kalev Tallinn, (Croatia) Lokomotiva, (France) Lyon, (Serbia) Partizan, (Serbia) Rad, (Serbia) Radnički Kragujevac, (Spain) Real Madrid, (France) Rennes, (Spain) Valencia, (Estonia) Viljandi, (Serbia) Vojvodina, (England) West Bromwich Albion
1	(Greece) AEK Athens, (England) Arsenal, (Greece) Atromitos, (England) Birmingham City, (Serbia) Borča, (Spain) Celta Vigo, (France) Châteauroux, (England) Chelsea, (Croatia) Cibalia, (Spain) Deportivo La Coruña, (Greece) Ergotelis, (Serbia) Hajduk Kula, (Italy) Juventus (Estonia) Kuressaare, (France) Le Havre, (Portugal) União de Leiria, (France) Lens, (France) Lille, (Spain) Málaga, (England) Manchester City, (England) Middlesbrough, (France) Monaco, (France) Montpellier, (Portugal) Nacional, (Germany) 1. FC Nürnberg, (France) Nantes, (France) Nice, (Denmark) OB, (Greece) Panionios, (Greece) PAOK, (France) Saint-Étienne, (Spain) Sevilla, (Estonia) Sörve, (Estonia) Tammeka, (Serbia) Teleoptik (England) Tottenham Hotspur, (Hungary) Videoton, (Spain) Villareal, (England) West Ham United, (Bosnia and Herzegovina) Zrinjski Mostar

=== By club nationality ===
Players	Clubs
21	Portugal
19	England
18	Greece
17	Estonia
16	Croatia, France, Serbia, Spain
1	Bosnia and Herzegovina, Denmark, Germany, Hungary, Italy

Nations in italics are not represented by their national teams in the finals.
