= Haapsalu linnastaadion =

Multi-purpose stadium in Haapsalu, Estonia

Coordinates: 58°56′11.01″N 23°32′24.15″E

- Interactive map of Haapsalu linnastaadion
- Location: Haapsalu, Estonia
- Operator: Haapsalu Linna Spordibaasid
- Capacity: 1,080
- Surface: Grass
- Field size: 105 m × 65 m (344 ft × 213 ft)

Construction
- Renovated: 1996, 2009

Tenant
- Läänemaa JK

Haapsalu linnastaadion (English: Haapsalu City Stadium) is a multi-purpose stadium in Haapsalu, Estonia. The stadium holds 1,080 seating places of which 376 are under the roof. The address of the stadium is Lihula mnt 10, 90507 Haapsalu.

== Background ==
Although a small stadium, the Haapsalu linnastaadion has hosted some significant matches including:

- 2012 UEFA European Under-19 Football Championship - 3 matches
- 2012 UEFA Women's U-19 Championship First qualifying round - 3 matches
- UEFA Women's Euro 2013 qualifying round - Estonia v Slovakia

== 2012 UEFA European U19 Championship matches ==
Haapsalu linnastaadion hosted three group stage matches of the 2012 UEFA European Under-19 Football Championship and saw notable and later world-famous players such as Paul Pogba, João Cancelo, Kepa Arrizabalaga and many others all running onto the Haapsalu field.

2012 UEFA European Under-19 Championship
3 July 2012
17:30
Group A

Greece	1–2	Spain
Diamantakos 66'	Report	Jesé 30'; Derik 40'

Attendance: 1,350
Referee: Vadims Direktorenko (Latvia)
6 July 2012
16:30
Group B

France	1–0	Croatia
Foulquier 79'	Report

Attendance: 1,182
Referee: Vadims Direktorenko (Latvia)
9 July 2012
17:00
Group A

Portugal	2–3	Greece
Gomes 19'; Betinho 90+6'	Report	Gianniotas 18'; Katidis 42', 69'

Attendance: 1,193
Referee: Alain Bieri (Switzerland)
