= 2012 UEFA European Under-19 Championship elite qualification =

2012 UEFA European Under-19 Championship (Elite Round) was the second round of qualifications for the final tournament of 2012 UEFA European Under-19 Championship. The 25 teams that advanced from the qualifying round plus three teams who received byes to the elite round were distributed into seven groups of four teams each, with each group played in a round-robin format, with one of the four teams hosting all six group matches. The seven group-winning teams qualified automatically for the final tournament in Estonia.

== Seeds ==
The draw for the elite round was held on 29 November 2011 in Nyon, with matches scheduled between 23 and 31 May 2012. A total of 28 participating teams were divided in four draw pots based on the coefficient ranking list established by taking into account only the results of the qualifying round. England, France and Spain received byes to the elite round and were seeded in the first pot.

Pot A	Pot B	Pot C	Pot D
England; France; Spain; Bosnia and Herzegovina; Portugal; Greece; Hungary	Germany; Croatia; Belgium; Ukraine; Switzerland; Netherlands; Denmark	Georgia; Romania; Slovenia; Republic of Ireland; Armenia; Czech Republic; Turkey	Austria; Norway; Cyprus; Israel; Italy; Serbia; Montenegro

The hosts of the seven one-venue mini-tournament groups are indicated below in italics.

== Tiebreakers ==
If two or more teams are equal on points on completion of the group matches, the following criteria are applied to determine the rankings.

1. Higher number of points obtained in the group matches played among the teams in question
2. Superior goal difference from the group matches played among the teams in question
3. Higher number of goals scored in the group matches played among the teams in question
4. If, after applying criteria 1) to 3) to several teams, two teams still have an equal ranking, the criteria 1) to 3) will be reapplied to determine the ranking of these teams. If this procedure does not lead to a decision, criteria 5) and 6) will apply
5. Results of all group matches:
  1. Superior goal difference
  2. Higher number of goals scored
6. Drawing of lots

Additionally, if two teams which have the same number of points and the same number of goals scored and conceded play their last group match against each other and are still equal at the end of that match, their final rankings are determined by the penalty shoot-out and not by the criteria listed above. This procedure is applicable only if a ranking of the teams is required to determine the group winner.

== Group 1 ==
Team	Pld	W	D	L	GF	GA	GD	Pts
France	3	3	0	0	11	2	+9	9
Netherlands	3	2	0	1	5	7	−2	6
Norway	3	1	0	2	3	5	−2	3
Czech Republic	3	0	0	3	1	6	−5	0

25 May 2012
17:00

France	2–1	Czech Republic
Bahebeck 48'; Vion 58'	Report	Lutonský 19'

Stadion SC Horní Počernice, Prague
Referee: Felix Zwayer (Germany)

25 May 2012
17:00

Netherlands	2–1	Norway
Locadia 37', 43'	Report	Valsvik 49'

Městský stadion SK Slaný, Slaný
Referee: Radu Petrescu (Romania)

27 May 2012
17:00

France	3–1	Norway
Bahebeck 30'; Bosetti 67' (pen.), 71'	Report	Skogsrud 36'

Stadion SC Horní Počernice, Prague
Referee: Anatoliy Abdula (Ukraine)

27 May 2012
17:00

Czech Republic	0–3	Netherlands
	Report	Locadia 36'; Depay 76'; Achahbar 90+2'

Stadion FK Bohemians Praha, Prague
Referee: Radu Petrescu (Romania)

30 May 2012
17:00

Netherlands	0–6	France
	Report	Kondogbia 5'; Digne 23'; Bahebeck 56'; Bosetti 58'; Pogba 61'; Vion 83'

Stadion FK Bohemians Praha, Prague
Referee: Felix Zwayer (Germany)

30 May 2012
17:00

Norway	1–0	Czech Republic
Nielsen 27'	Report

Městský stadion SK Slaný, Slaný
Referee: Anatoliy Abdula (Ukraine)

== Group 2 ==
Team	Pld	W	D	L	GF	GA	GD	Pts
England	3	2	1	0	7	1	+6	7
Montenegro	3	1	1	1	4	2	+2	4
Switzerland	3	1	0	2	2	4	−2	3
Slovenia	3	1	0	2	1	7	−6	3

25 May 2012
16:00

Switzerland	0–3	Montenegro
	Report	Đorđević 23', 68'; Vukčević 53'

Spotland Stadium, Rochdale
Referee: Eitan Shemeulevitch (Israel)

25 May 2012
20:30

England	5–0	Slovenia
Chalobah 48'; Thorpe 54'; W. Keane 82', 90+3'; T. Kane 88'	Report

Deepdale, Preston
Referee: Peter Královič (Slovakia)

27 May 2012
16:00

Slovenia	0–2	Switzerland
	Report	Kleiber 11'; Schmid 42'

Deepdale, Preston
Referee: Athanasios Giachos (Greece)

27 May 2012
20:30

England	1–1	Montenegro
Afobe 85'	Report	Vukčević 25'

Spotland Stadium, Rochdale
Referee: Eitan Shemeulevitch (Israel)

30 May 2012
20:30

Switzerland	0–1	England
	Report	Berahino 90+4'

Deepdale, Preston
Referee: Athanasios Giachos (Greece)

30 May 2012
20:30

Montenegro	0–1	Slovenia
	Report	Kovjenič 81' (pen.)

Spotland Stadium, Rochdale
Referee: Peter Královič (Slovakia)

== Group 3 ==
Team	Pld	W	D	L	GF	GA	GD	Pts
Serbia	3	2	1	0	6	2	+4	7
Germany	3	1	2	0	6	3	+3	5
Romania	3	1	1	1	5	4	+1	4
Hungary	3	0	0	3	0	8	−8	0

25 May 2012
16:30

Hungary	0–4	Romania
	Report	Gavra 11'; Manole 37'; Stanciu 55'; Ioniță 81'

Stadion Slana Bara, Novi Sad
Referee: John Beaton (Scotland)

25 May 2012
19:00

Germany	2–2	Serbia
Hofmann 48'; Schulz 84'	Report	Aksentijević 20'; Mitrović 60'

Stadion Karađorđe, Novi Sad
Referee: Stephan Klossner (Switzerland)

27 May 2012
16:30

Romania	1–1	Germany
Puțanu 90'	Report	Rüdiger 87'

Stadion Slana Bara, Novi Sad
Referee: Denis Scherbakov (Belarus)

27 May 2012
19:00

Hungary	0–1	Serbia
	Report	Ninković 86'

Stadion Karađorđe, Novi Sad
Referee: John Beaton (Scotland)

30 May 2012
17:00

Germany	3–0	Hungary
Schulz 42'; Ranković 44'; Füllkrug 88'	Report

Stadion Slana Bara, Novi Sad
Referee: Denis Scherbakov (Belarus)

30 May 2012
17:00

Serbia	3–0	Romania
Mitrović 41' (pen.), 77' (pen.); Ninković 45+3'	Report

Stadion Karađorđe, Novi Sad
Referee: Stephan Klossner (Switzerland)

== Group 4 ==
Team	Pld	W	D	L	GF	GA	GD	Pts
Portugal	3	3	0	0	11	1	+10	9
Ukraine	3	2	0	1	5	3	+2	6
Republic of Ireland	3	0	1	2	1	5	−4	1
Israel	3	0	1	2	2	10	−8	1

26 May 2012
17:00

Ukraine	2–0	Israel
Kulach 18'; Polyulyakh 71'	Report

Estádio Municipal Bela Vista, Parchal
Referee: Danilo Grujić (Serbia)

26 May 2012
19:00

Portugal	1–0	Republic of Ireland
Barker 87' (o.g.)	Report

Estádio José Arcanjo, Olhão
Referee: Alexandre Boucaut (Belgium)

28 May 2012
17:00

Republic of Ireland	0–3	Ukraine
	Report	Taschy 53'; Churko 56'; Bratkov 66' (pen.)

Estádio Municipal Bela Vista, Parchal
Referee: Adrien Jaccottet (Switzerland)

28 May 2012
19:00

Portugal	7–1	Israel
Ié 8'; João Mário 43' (pen.); Esgaio 44'; Gomes 47'; Betinho 75', 81'; Cavaleiro 77'	Report	Atar 59'

Estádio da Nora, Ferreiras
Referee: Alexandre Boucaut (Belgium)

31 May 2012
19:00

Ukraine	0–3	Portugal
	Report	Cá 35'; Betinho 58'; Bruma 61' (pen.)

Estádio Algarve, Faro
Referee: Adrien Jaccottet (Switzerland)

31 May 2012
19:00

Israel	1–1	Republic of Ireland
Hirsh 89'	Report	O'Brien 50'

Estádio da Nora, Ferreiras
Referee: Danilo Grujić (Serbia)

== Group 5 ==
Team	Pld	W	D	L	GF	GA	GD	Pts
Greece	3	3	0	0	8	0	+8	9
Denmark	3	2	0	1	9	5	+4	6
Turkey	3	1	0	2	6	6	0	3
Cyprus	3	0	0	3	2	14	−12	0

23 May 2012
12:30

Greece	3–0	Turkey
Diamantakos 66', 75'; Mavrias 90+3'	Report

Ballerup, Ballerup
Referee: Marco Fritz (Germany)

23 May 2012
16:30

Denmark	6–2	Cyprus
Helstrup 6', 66'; Bech 42'; Brock-Madsen 53'; Fischer 78', 90+2'	Report	Sotiriou 50', 58' (pen.)

Gladsaxe Stadium, Søborg
Referee: Mikhail Vilkov (Russia)

25 May 2012
15:00

Greece	3–0	Cyprus
Diamantakos 6'; Stafylidis 43', 88'	Report

Gentofte Stadion, Gentofte
Referee: Robert Rogers (Ireland)

25 May 2012
18:00

Turkey	1–3	Denmark
Çalhanoğlu 87'	Report	Brock-Madsen 33'; Olsen 63'; Pedersen 90+5' (pen.)

Brøndby Stadium, Brøndby
Referee: Mikhail Vilkov (Russia)

28 May 2012
14:00

Denmark	0–2	Greece
	Report	Gianniotas 47'; Mavrias 57'

Gentofte Stadion, Gentofte
Referee: Marco Fritz (Germany)

28 May 2012
14:00

Cyprus	0–5	Turkey
	Report	Deniz 18', 88'; Başıbüyük 45+1'; Türk 53'; Ataseven 81'

Brøndby Stadium, Brøndby
Referee: Robert Rogers (Ireland)

== Group 6 ==
Team	Pld	W	D	L	GF	GA	GD	Pts
Croatia	3	2	1	0	7	3	+4	7
Georgia	3	2	0	1	7	6	+1	6
Austria	3	1	1	1	5	4	+1	4
Bosnia and Herzegovina	3	0	0	3	2	8	−6	0

25 May 2012
16:30

Bosnia and Herzegovina	2–4	Georgia
Maletić 20', 43' (pen.)	Report	Kazaishvili 24'; Chanturia 35'; Skhirtladze 39', 61'

Stadion Sv. Josip Radnik, Sesvete
Referee: Michael Tykgaard (Denmark)

25 May 2012
16:30

Croatia	2–2	Austria
Dugandžić 8', 89'	Report	Vastić 48'; Murg 74'

Stadion ŠRC Zaprešić, Zaprešić
Referee: Serdar Gözübüyük (Netherlands)

27 May 2012
16:30

Bosnia and Herzegovina	0–2	Austria
	Report	Murg 59' (pen.); Vastić 84'

Stadion Lučko, Zagreb
Referee: Adam Lyczmański (Poland)

27 May 2012
16:30

Georgia	1–3	Croatia
Gagnidze 90+3'	Report	Pajač 25'; Dugandžić 58'; Rebić 67'

Stadion NŠC Stjepan Spajić, Zagreb
Referee: Michael Tykgaard (Denmark)

30 May 2012
16:30

Croatia	2–0	Bosnia and Herzegovina
Rebić 25'; Čolak 72'	Report

Stadion Lučko, Zagreb
Referee: Serdar Gözübüyük (Netherlands)

30 May 2012
16:30

Austria	1–2	Georgia
Vastić 51'	Report	Chanturia 40' (pen.), 68'

Stadion ŠRC Velika Gorica, Velika Gorica
Referee: Adam Lyczmański (Poland)

== Group 7 ==
Team	Pld	W	D	L	GF	GA	GD	Pts
Spain	3	3	0	0	6	3	+3	9
Italy	3	2	0	1	7	4	+3	6
Belgium	3	0	1	2	3	5	−2	1
Armenia	3	0	1	2	3	7	−4	1

23 May 2012
15:00

Spain	2–1	Armenia
Suso 65'; Juanmi 90+4'	Report	Hakobyan 72'

Misano Adriatico Nuovo, Misano Adriatico
Referee: Ivaylo Stoyanov (Bulgaria)

23 May 2012
15:00

Belgium	1–2	Italy
Carrasco 63'	Report	Improta 16'; Schiavone 45+1' (pen.)

Stadio Giorgio Calbi, Cattolica
Referee: Alexander Harkam (Austria)

25 May 2012
15:00

Spain	2–1	Italy
Campaña 72'; Jesé 82'	Report	Improta 11'

Misano Adriatico Nuovo, Misano Adriatico
Referee: Michael Oliver (England)

25 May 2012
15:00

Armenia	1–1	Belgium
Hovhannisyan 88'	Report	Van der Bruggen 36'

Stadio Giorgio Calbi, Cattolica
Referee: Ivaylo Stoyanov (Bulgaria)

28 May 2012
15:00

Belgium	1–2	Spain
Bruno 86'	Report	Deulofeu 10'; Suárez 67'

Stadio Giorgio Calbi, Cattolica
Referee: Michael Oliver (England)

28 May 2012
15:00

Italy	4–1	Armenia
Valoti 2'; Belotti 14'; Beltrame 83'; Busellato 89'	Report	Papikyan 18'

Misano Adriatico Nuovo, Misano Adriatico
Referee: Alexander Harkam (Austria)

== Qualified nations ==
Country	Qualified as	Previous appearances in tournament^{1}
Estonia	Hosts	**0** (debut)
France	Group 1 winner	**5** (2003, **2005**, 2007, 2009, **2010**)
England	Group 2 winner	**6** (2002, 2003, 2005, 2008, 2009, 2010)
Serbia	Group 3 winner	**4** (2005, 2007, 2009, 2011)
Portugal	Group 4 winner	**4** (2003, 2006, 2007, 2010)
Greece	Group 5 winner	**4** (2005, 2007, 2008, 2011)
Croatia	Group 6 winner	**1** (2010)
Spain	Group 7 winner	**8** (**2002**, **2004**, **2006**, **2007**, 2008, 2009, 2010, **2011**)

^{1} Only counted appearances for under-19 era (bold indicates champion for that year, while italic indicates hosts)
