= Greece national under-19 football team =

National association football team

Greece Under-19
- Nickname(s): Εθνική Νέων ("Youth National Team")
- Association: Hellenic Football Federation
- Head coach: Apostolos Papavasiliou
- Captain: Dimitrios Bataoulas
- Most caps: Sotiris Liberopoulos (32)
- Top scorer: Kostas Mitroglou (12)
First colours	Second colours

First international
- Czechoslovakia 2–0 Greece (Hungary; 29 March 1956)

Biggest win
- Greece 10–0 Andorra (Greece; 21 October 2011)

Biggest defeat
- Belgium 7–1 Greece (Belgium; 21 May 1977)

UEFA U-19 Championship
- Appearances: 7 (first in 2005)
- Best result: Runners-up (2007, 2012)

FIFA U-20 World Cup
- Appearances: 1 (first in 2013)
- Best result: Round of 16 (2013)

The Greece national under-19 football team is the national football team of Greece and is controlled by the Hellenic Football Federation. In July 2007 the Under-20/19 Football Team finished second in the 2007 UEFA European Under-19 Football Championship in Linz, Austria. They also reached the final of the 2012 UEFA European Under-19 Football Championship.

== History ==
=== First and early years ===
The Youth National Team of Greece (U-18) was first set up in 1956 for their participation in the UEFA European Under-18 Championship, which was held in Hungary. Since then, they have been continuously participating in European Youth Leagues, formerly as U-18 and since 2002 as U-19. They have qualified several times in the final stage and has played twice in the final of the event: in 2007 and 2012 and three times in the final: 1974 and 1999 (defeated) and 1995 (who beat and took third place).

=== The road to Austria ===
Greece Under-19 Team started the campaign leading to the 2007 UEFA European Under-19 Football Championship in October 2006. During the first qualifying round the team was seeded in the Group 1, with Bulgaria (hostess), Ukraine and Kazakhstan being the other participants in the group. Greece finished at the top of the Group 1, after two wins against the hosts Bulgarians (2–0 on October 20, goals by Lampropoulos and Vallianos) and Ukraine (2–1 on October 25, goals by Vasilis Pliatsikas and Lampropoulos). The team also lost 4–2 to Kazakhstan (October 22, goals by Kostas Mitroglou and Pliatsikas).

Greece hosted the next phase, called Elite Round, facing now stronger opponents. Against Croatia on June 1 of 2007, Greece was held to 2–2 by a late equaliser despite two goals from the Greek promising attacker Kostas Mitroglou. Two days later, Mitroglou stroke against and lead the team to a 2–0 win against Italy, Siovas scoring the other goal. Finally, on June 6, Greece crushed Sweden 4–0, with goals from Papadopoulos, Mitroglou, Ath. Papazoglou and a late own-goal from the Swedish team. Again, Greece U-19 Team sealed the first place of the group.

=== 2007 European Under-19 Championship in Austria ===
Greece was seeded in the Group A with Austria, Portugal and Spain. The team started with a precious victory against Portugal (16 July 2007), in a close encounter with many opportunities from both sides. Sotiris Ninis and Kostas Mitroglou were a constant danger and finally the second scored on the 52nd minute. Two days later, Greece faced the hosting Austria team and also the crowd that filled the stadium in Pasching. Ninis showed great vision breaking the Austrian defense with a through ball that brought Mitroglou alone against the opponent goalkeeper. Mitroglou scored again but the hosts scored a second half goal from penalty and the match ended 1–1. On July 21 Greece faced holders and favourites Spain. Both teams qualified after a goalless draw, despite a good second half performance from the Greek side and a lost penalty by Mitroglou.

The semifinal against Germany was held on July 24 in Steyr. The German side included promising stars with experience in the Bundesliga, such as Sebastian Tyrala, Jerome Boateng, and Anis Ben-Hatira. The Germans, who had finished first in Group B, started strongly and piled up pressure until they scored on the 25th minute with Ben-Hatira. Greece responded almost immediately with shots from Papadopoulos, Vasilis Pliatsikas and Mitroglou and it was Sotiris Ninis, Greece's wonderkid who unlocked the German defense on the 40th minute to score a deserved equaliser. Greece seemed vivid in the start of the second half and had some chances until Ninis with a clever header found Mitroglou in the area 58 minutes after the start of the game. The Greek striker scored his third goal of the tournament and Greece was now ahead 2–1. On the 61st minute Vasilis Pliatsikas was shown a second yellow card and the team now is left with ten. Germany started its counterattack and was given a controversial penalty four minutes later, taken successfully from Ben-Hatira for the 2–2. Despite playing with ten men the Greek side managed to overcome the German pressure and tried to hit back. It was the 90th minute when Ninis took a corner from left, aimed Lambropoulos at the near post and the young forward beat the German goalkeeper to give a dramatic and memorable 3–2 win to the Greek side.

Greece faced Spain on July 27 in Linz. The Spanish coach, Juan Santisteban and his side were the holders and the first to reach successive U-19 finals. Players from giants Real Madrid, Valencia, Barcelona were among the Spanish players. The Greek team, on the other side was very confident and inspired by the coaching of Nikos Nioplias who pushed a ten-men team forward in the game against Germany. However Greece had two experienced players out. Vasilis Pliatsikas had faced a red card in the semifinal and the captain, central defender Sokratis Papastathopoulos picked a second yellow in the tournament when Germany was awarded a controversial penalty in the semifinal. It is said that the referee has acknowledged his mistake to Papastathopoulos after the game.

The game started with long shots from the Spanish team in the first ten minutes and the Greek team was also dangerous with Mitroglou and Ninis. Unfortunately Greece paid for the missed chances when Daniel Parejo scored a free-kick from a wide position on the 38 minute, after the best Spanish player, Aaron had won a foul from Siakas. Greece showed an impressive fight to come back with chances missed from Moniakis, Siovas, Mitroglou and Papadopoulos but the Spanish defence held during the second half. The Spanish team won the final but the Greek team deserved more with its display after the 1–0. Nikos Nioplias expressed his pride in the team after the game and the Spanish coach referred to a "great Greek side". Sotiris Ninis and Sokratis Papastathopoulos were included by UEFA in the "name-to-note" list after the end of the tournament. Kostas Mitroglou, with 3 goals in 5 games, shared the first scorer title with highly rated Ben-Hatira (Germany) and Monnet-Paquet (France).

=== 2012 European Under-19 Championship in Estonia ===
Only three countries (Greece, Serbia and the defending champions, Spain) had been at the 2011 finals in Romania. The 2012 final tournament in Estonia served as a qualifying event for the forthcoming FIFA Under-20 World Cup, with Croatia, England, France, Greece, Portugal and Spain earning places at the final tournament to be played in Turkey from 21 June to 13 July 2013. The Spaniards started the tournament as the only country to have successfully defended the Under-19 title and, during the first half of their opening game against Greece, Julen Lopetegui's side produced trademark patient, possession-based combination play with Gerard Deulofeu, in particular, creating danger with his skill on either flank. His run on the right provided Spain's first goal but, after the second, they struggled with the higher pressing by the Greek team and needed resilience to hang on for a 2–1 win.

Against Greece, Estonia started well. But Greece took the lead through Giorgos Katidis and, improving in the second half, scored two magnificent goals. Karl-Eerik Luigend scored Estonia's only goal of the tournament but Greece had the last word with a fourth goal. With Spain into the semi-finals and the hosts eliminated, the Portugal v Greece match in Rakvere took on must-win dimensions for the latter, whereas Edgar Borges' team needed only a point. After a cautious start, the game burst into life in the 16th minute when Giannis Gianniotas cut in from the right and rounded off a fine individual effort with a left-footed finish. Within 60 seconds, André Gomes collected the ball outside the box, beat three defenders and levelled with a powerful shot. When Daniel Martins was shown a red card for violent conduct, Greece sensed their opportunity and, a few minutes later, captain Katidis scored the first of his two goals. Even when the Greeks were also reduced to ten in the second half, they continued to dominate, even though substitute Betinho set up a nail-biting finish by making it 3–2 with a late goal.

The first was marked by the dismissal of Greek keeper Stefanos Kapino during added time at the end of the first half, when his team were leading 1–0. But the first action by reserve keeper Sokratis Dioudis was to save the ensuing penalty. England took the upper hand after equalising in the 56th minute but failed to beat Dioudis and were beaten by a counterattack in the 18th minute of extra-time.

In the final, against Spain both sides displayed admirable speed in transitions both from defence into attack and vice versa. While Spain's No. 17, Gerard Deulofeu, operating on the right wing after the break, was a constant menace with his incisive dribbling movements, the Greeks, meanwhile, threatened with inswinging corners and free kicks from Kostas Stafylidis and Giannis Gianniotas respectively. Ten minutes before the end of the game, Gerard Deulofeu went to the byline and forced a save from the Greek keeper, Sokratis Dioudis, with a dangerous cutback. One minute later, and the decisive moment of the match arrived. With great tenacity, Spanish full-back Jonny stole the ball from the Greeks just inside their own half. Within the blink of an eye, the ball was transferred to right-wing partner Gerard Deulofeu. The latter ran to the heart of the Greek defence and slid a perfectly weighted, subtle through pass to his fellow winger, Jesé who scored the only goal.

=== UEFA European Under-19 Championship ===
UEFA European Under-19 Championship record										Qualification record						
Year	Round	Position	Pld	W	D	L	GF	GA	GD	Pld	W	D	L	GF	GA	GD
(Norway) 2002	did not qualify									5	2	0	3	11	10	+1
(Liechtenstein) 2003	did not qualify									3	0	1	2	3	6	−3
(Switzerland) 2004	did not qualify									3	0	2	1	2	3	−1
(Northern Ireland) 2005	Group stage	6th	3	1	0	2	1	6	−5	6	4	1	1	11	3	+8
(Poland) 2006	did not qualify									3	1	0	2	6	7	−1
(Austria) 2007	Final	Runners-up	5	2	2	1	5	4	+1	6	4	1	1	14	7	+7
(Czech Republic) 2008	Group stage	7th	3	0	2	1	1	4	−3	6	4	1	1	14	7	+7
(Ukraine) 2009	did not qualify									6	2	0	4	5	6	−1
(France) 2010	did not qualify									6	4	1	1	7	2	+5
(Romania) 2011	Group stage	6th	3	1	0	2	2	3	−1	6	4	1	1	7	4	+3
(Estonia) 2012	Final	Runners-up	5	3	0	2	10	7	+3	6	5	1	0	21	2	+19
(Lithuania) 2013	did not qualify									6	1	3	2	5	6	−1
(Hungary) 2014	did not qualify									6	1	2	3	7	14	−7
(Greece) 2015	Semi-finals	3rd/4th	4	1	1	2	2	6	−4	Qualified as hosts						
(Germany) 2016	did not qualify									6	3	1	2	6	9	−3
(Georgia (country)) 2017	did not qualify									6	3	1	2	11	5	+6
(Finland) 2018	did not qualify									6	3	0	3	12	10	+2
(Armenia) 2019	did not qualify									6	4	1	1	17	9	+8
(Northern Ireland) ~~2020~~	Cancelled									3	1	0	2	7	7	0
(Romania) ~~2021~~	Cancelled									Cancelled						
(Slovakia) 2022	did not qualify									3	0	2	1	1	2	−1
(Malta) 2023	Group stage	7th	3	0	1	2	4	10	−6	6	4	2	0	11	2	+9
(Northern Ireland) 2024	did not qualify									6	1	1	4	7	10	−3
(Romania) 2025	did not qualify									3	1	0	2	5	6	−1
(Wales) 2026	did not qualify									6	2	2	2	14	6	+8
(Czech Republic) 2027	to be determined (Round 2)									3	1	1	1	4	3	+1
Total	0 titles	7/21	26	8	6	12	25	40	−15	119	54	25	40	203	139	+63

== Honours ==
Greece national under-19 football team honours
Type	Competition	Titles	Winners	Runners-up	Third place	Ref.
International	UEFA European Under-19 Championship	0		2007, 2012	2015	

- record
- ^{S} Shared record

== Results and schedule ==
The following is a list of match results from the previous 12 months, as well as any future matches that have been scheduled.

=== 2026 ===
10 February 2026 Friendly tournament	Turkey	0–0	Greece	Rijeka, Croatia
16:00		Report		Stadium: Stadion Rujevica

12 February 2026 Friendly tournament	Croatia	2–0	Greece	Poreč, Croatia
16:00	Rados 24'; Godec 88'	Report		Stadium: Zelena Laguna Football Camp

25 March 2026 2026 UEFA European Under-19 Championship qualification – Elite Round	Greece	1–1	Austria	Frankfurt, Germany
13:00	Tsigkas 3'	Report	Adejenughure 27'	Stadium: DFB–Campus; Referee: Bulat Sariyev (Kazakhstan)

28 March 2026 2026 UEFA European Under-19 Championship qualification – Elite Round	Germany	1–0	Greece	Dreieich, Germany
19:00	Onyeka 84'	Report		Stadium: Sportpark Dreieich; Referee: Bulat Sariyev (Kazakhstan)

31 March 2026 2026 UEFA European Under-19 Championship qualification – Elite Round	Sweden	2–2	Greece	Frankfurt, Germany
19:00	Arrhov 12'; Öhman 65'	Report	Mythou 36', 73'	Stadium: DFB–Campus; Referee: Antoni Bandić (Bosnia and Herzegovina)

27 May 2026 Friendly	Cyprus	0–2	Greece	Achna, Cyprus
10:00		Report	Sidiropoulos 6' (pen.); Tsiokos 10'	Stadium: Dasaki Stadium; Referee: Giorgos Psevdiotis (Cyprus

28 May 2026 Friendly	Greece	1–2	England	Achna, Cyprus
12:30	Berdos 36'	Report	Benamar 29'; Monga 77'	Stadium: Dasaki Stadium

3 June 2026 2027 UEFA European Under-19 Championship qualification	Greece	0–1	Serbia	Thessaloniki, Greece
18:00		Report	Millwood 90+4'	Stadium: Toumba Stadium; Referee: Kamal Umudlu (Azerbaijan)

6 June 2026 2027 UEFA European Under-19 Championship qualification	Portugal	0–0	Greece	Thessaloniki, Greece
18:00		Report		Stadium: Toumba Stadium; Referee: Romain Lissorgue (France)

9 June 2026 2027 UEFA European Under-19 Championship qualification	Kazakhstan	2–4	Greece	Thessaloniki, Greece
18:00	Bekbolat 77'; Smakov 84'	Report	Avramoulis 32'; Berdos 41', 52'; Toursounidis 50'	Stadium: Toumba Stadium; Referee: Romain Lissorgue (France)

11 November 2026 2027 UEFA European Under-19 Championship qualification – Round 2	Republic of Ireland	2–0	Greece	Plaintel, France
16:00	Noonan 58'; O'Neill 58'	Report		Stadium: Espace Oceane; Referee: Mihály Káprály (Hungary)

14 November 2026 2027 UEFA European Under-19 Championship qualification – Round 2	Greece	0–0	Norway	Plaintel, France
16:00		Report		Stadium: Espace Oceane; Referee: Klym Zabroda (Ukraine)

17 November 2026 2027 UEFA European Under-19 Championship qualification – Round 2	Greece	1–2	France	Pabu, France
16:00	Aretis 46'	Report	Assab 2'; Valero 9'	Stadium: EAG Akedemi; Referee: Mateo Busquets Ferrer (Spain)

== Euro Under-19 Championship qualification ==
=== 2027 UEFA European U-19 Championship qualification ===
==== Group A1 ====
Pos	Team	Pld	W	D	L	GF	GA	GD	Pts	Transfer or relegation
1	France (H)	3	2	1	0	10	3	+7	7	Transferred to Round 3 League A
2	Republic of Ireland	3	1	2	0	6	4	+2	5	Transferred to Round 3 League A
3	Norway	3	0	2	1	2	8	−6	2	Transferred to Round 3 League A
4	Greece	3	0	1	2	1	4	−3	1	Relegated to Round 3 League B

Updated to match(es) played on 17 November 2026. Source: UEFA
Rules for classification: Qualification tiebreakers
(H) Hosts

== Players ==
=== Current squad ===
The following 21 players were called up for the 2027 UEFA European Under-19 Championship qualification matches, to be played in France between 11 and 17 November 2026.

Caps and goals correct as of 17 November 2026, after the match against France.

No.	Pos.	Player	Date of birth (age)	Caps	Goals	Club
1	GK	Giannis Kriaras	18 June 2008 (age 18)	7	0	(Hellenic Football Federation) Asteras Tripolis U19
12	GK	Loukas Stamellos	28 March 2008 (age 18)	2	0	(Hellenic Football Federation) Kifisia
13	GK	Vasilios Ioannou	9 June 2008 (age 18)	0	0	(Hellenic Football Federation) AEK U19
2	DF	Dimitrios Kyriazidis	13 July 2008 (age 18)	8	0	(Hellenic Football Federation) PAOK U19
3	DF	Pavlos Kenourgiakis	6 March 2008 (age 18)	10	0	(Hellenic Football Federation) OFI
4	DF	Angelos Vyntra	26 February 2008 (age 18)	5	0	(Cyprus Football Association) Omonia 29M
5	DF	Nikolaos Avramoulis	6 August 2008 (age 18)	8	1	(Hellenic Football Federation) Olympiacos B
15	DF	Charalampos Avgitidis	23 February 2008 (age 18)	7	0	(Hellenic Football Federation) PAOK U19
16	DF	Athanasios Christopoulos	5 January 2008 (age 18)	7	0	(Hellenic Football Federation) Olympiacos U19
18	DF	Theodoros Venetis	21 April 2008 (age 18)	6	0	(Hellenic Football Federation) Olympiacos B
6	MF	Evagjelos Gjoka	26 July 2008 (age 18)	8	0	(Hellenic Football Federation) PAOK B
7	MF	Christos Kapellas	25 October 2008 (age 18)	8	0	(Hellenic Football Federation) Olympiacos B
8	MF	Konstantinos Theocharis	21 May 2008 (age 18)	8	0	(Hellenic Football Federation) Panathinaikos U19
14	MF	Dimitrios Kanios	17 March 2008 (age 18)	1	0	(Hellenic Football Federation) PAOK U19
17	MF	Stavros Ioannou	22 February 2008 (age 18)	7	0	(Hellenic Football Federation) Panathinaikos U19
9	FW	Georgios Krommydas	10 July 2008 (age 18)	3	0	(Hellenic Football Federation) PAOK U19
10	FW	Dimitrios Berdos (captain)	27 May 2008 (age 18)	11	3	(Hellenic Football Federation) PAOK B
11	FW	Antonios Aretis	25 August 2008 (age 18)	8	1	(Hellenic Football Federation) PAOK U19
19	FW	Anastasios Amanatidis	30 June 2008 (age 18)	2	0	(Hellenic Football Federation) AEK U19
20	FW	Leonidas Ilias Tsiokos	10 December 2008 (age 17)	8	1	(German Football Association) Eintracht Frankfurt U19
21	FW	Athanasios Sitmalidis	18 May 2008 (age 18)	7	0	(Hellenic Football Federation) OFI

=== Recent call-ups ===
Following are listed players called up in the previous twelve months who are still eligible to represent the under-19 team.

Pos.	Player	Date of birth (age)	Caps	Goals	Club	Latest call-up
GK	Ioannis Kechlimparis	23 May 2008 (age 18)	1	0	(Poland) Legia Warsaw U19	v.Kazakhstan, 9 June 2026
GK	Efstathios Beleris	5 March 2007 (age 19)	12	0	(Greece) PAOK B	v.Sweden, 31 March 2026
GK	Theofilos Kakadiaris	17 January 2007 (age 19)	5	0	(Greece) Asteras Tripolis	v.Sweden, 31 March 2026
GK	Vasilios Kaltsas	25 May 2007 (age 19)	3	0	(Slovakia) ŠTK Šamorín	v.Sweden, 31 March 2026
DF	Antonios Dimakopoulos	7 October 2008 (age 18)	2	0	(Greece) Panathinaikos U19	v.Kazakhstan, 9 June 2026
DF	Konstantinos Lagoudakis	15 January 2008 (age 18)	2	0	(Greece) OFI	v.Kazakhstan, 9 June 2026
DF	Pavlos Tsiotas	6 January 2007 (age 19)	13	0	(Greece) PAOK B	v.Sweden, 31 March 2026
DF	Bedri Dunga	27 March 2007 (age 19)	13	1	(Greece) PAOK B	v.Sweden, 31 March 2026
DF	Dimitrios Bataoulas	29 May 2007 (age 19)	18	1	(Greece) PAOK	v.Sweden, 31 March 2026
DF	Georgios Kosidis	13 June 2007 (age 19)	16	2	(Greece) PAOK	v.Sweden, 31 March 2026
DF	Rayan Oyebade	30 April 2007 (age 19)	4	0	(England) Southend United	v.Sweden, 31 March 2026
DF	Stavros Psyropoulos	21 March 2007 (age 19)	6	0	(Greece) AEK U19	v.Sweden, 31 March 2026
DF	Nektarios Kaloskamis	10 January 2008 (age 18)	6	0	(Greece) Kifisia	v.Sweden, 31 March 2026
DF	Vasilios Karkatsalis	10 April 2007 (age 19)	3	0	(Greece) Olympiacos B	v.Croatia, 12 February 2026
MF	Konstantinos Toursounidis	13 April 2008 (age 18)	6	1	(Greece) PAOK B	v.Kazakhstan, 9 June 2026
MF	Manos Chnaris	24 March 2008 (age 18)	3	0	(Greece) OFI	v.Kazakhstan, 9 June 2026
MF	Giannis Sarris	20 March 2007 (age 19)	10	0	(Greece) PAOK B	v.Sweden, 31 March 2026
MF	Vasilios Eleftheriadis	2 June 2007 (age 19)	9	0	(Greece) PAOK B	v.Sweden, 31 March 2026
MF	Rushit Zeka	28 February 2007 (age 19)	10	0	(Cyprus) Omonia 29M	v.Sweden, 31 March 2026
MF	Christos Filis	25 June 2007 (age 19)	7	0	(Greece) Olympiacos	v.Sweden, 31 March 2026
FW	Anastasios Sidiropoulos	12 June 2008 (age 18)	4	1	(Spain) Mallorca U19	v.Kazakhstan, 9 June 2026
FW	Philippos Chapipis	9 September 2008 (age 18)	2	0	(Greece) PAOK U19	v.Kazakhstan, 9 June 2026
FW	Anestis Mythou	22 May 2007 (age 19)	17	8	(Greece) PAOK	v.Sweden, 31 March 2026
FW	Mattheos Tsigkas	4 June 2007 (age 19)	10	3	(Netherlands) VVV-Venlo	v.Sweden, 31 March 2026
FW	Petros Kolokotronis	21 December 2007 (age 18)	11	0	(Greece) Olympiacos B	v.Sweden, 31 March 2026
FW	Georgios Sokos	25 January 2007 (age 19)	12	3	(Cyprus) Omonia 29M	v.Sweden, 31 March 2026
FW	Athanasios Papanikopoulos	6 June 2007 (age 19)	8	2	(Greece) PAOK B	v.Sweden, 31 March 2026
FW	Konstantinos Charoupas	21 September 2007 (age 19)	13	2	(Greece) Aris	v.Sweden, 31 March 2026
FW	Giannis Bokos	3 February 2007 (age 19)	4	0	(Greece) Panathinaikos	v.Sweden, 31 March 2026
FW	Angelos Chaminta	21 March 2007 (age 19)	2	0	(Norway) Kongsvinger	v.Sweden, 31 March 2026
FW	Erik Hamza	24 August 2007 (age 19)	11	0	(Greece) Kalamata	v.Sweden, 31 March 2026
FW	Christian Koutroulis	14 October 2007 (age 19)	1	0	(Netherlands) Roda JC U21	v.Croatia, 12 February 2026
FW	Giannis Tsifoutis	21 August 2007 (age 19)	3	0	(Greece) PAOK B	v.Croatia, 12 February 2026
FW	Panagiotis Santis	21 February 2007 (age 19)	7	0	(Greece) Olympiacos B	v.Croatia, 12 February 2026
^{INJ} Withdrew due to injury^{PRE} Included in preliminary roster

== Player records ==
=== Top appearances ===
Rank	Player	Club(s)	Year(s)	U-19 Caps
1	Sotiris Liberopoulos	Erani Filiatra, Kalamata	1994–1996	32
2	Georgios Katidis	Aris	2010–2012	30
3	Panagiotis Deligiannidis	PAOK	2013–2015	26
4	Nikos Barboudis	Ilisiakos, AEK Athens, Fostiras, Apollon Kalamarias	2006–2008	24
4	Nikos Marinakis	Panathinaikos	2010–2012	24
5	Dimitrios Diamantakos	Olympiacos	2010–2012	22
5	Efthymis Koulouris	PAOK	2013–2015	22
6	Kostas Stafylidis	PAOK	2010–2012	21
7	Mavroudis Bougaidis	Aris, AEK Athens	2010–2012	20
7	Vasilios Pliatsikas	AEK Athens	2005–2007	20
7	Nikos Karelis	Ergotelis	2008–2011	20
7	Dimitrios Meliopoulos	Xanthi, PAOK	2017–2019	20
7	Albert Roussos	Juventus	2013–2015	20

=== Top goalscorers ===
Rank	Player	Club(s)	Year(s)	U-19 Goals
1	Kostas Mitroglou	Borussia Mönchengladbach II, Olympiacos	2005–2007	12
2	Dimitrios Diamantakos	Olympiacos	2010–2012	10
2	Michalis Pavlis	AEK Athens	2006–2008	10
3	Georgios Katidis	Aris	2010–2012	9
3	Apostolos Vellios	Iraklis, Everton	2010–2011	9
4	Anestis Mythou	PAOK, PAOK B	2024–	8
4	Dimitrios Emmanouilidis	Panathinaikos	2017–2019	8
4	Anastasios Douvikas	Asteras Tripolis	2017–2018	8
5	Stefanos Tzimas	PAOK	2023	7
6	Argyris Kampetsis	Olympiacos, Borussia Dortmund II	2017–2018	6
6	Lefteris Matsoukas	Olympiacos, Egaleo, Ethnikos Asteras, Werder Bremen II	2007–2009	6

== Former squads ==
- 2023 UEFA European Under-19 Championship squads – Greece
- 2015 UEFA European Under-19 Championship squads – Greece
- 2012 UEFA European Under-19 Championship squads – Greece
- 2011 UEFA European Under-19 Championship squads – Greece
- 2008 UEFA European Under-19 Championship squads – Greece
- 2007 UEFA European Under-19 Championship squads – Greece
- 2005 UEFA European Under-19 Championship squads – Greece

== See also ==
- Greece national football team
- Greece national under-23 football team
- Greece national under-21 football team
- Greece national under-20 football team
- Greece national under-17 football team
