= 2012 UEFA European Under-19 Championship =

2012. aasta U-19 Euroopa meistrivõistlused jalgpallis

Tournament details
- Host country: Estonia
- Dates: 3–15 July
- Teams: 8 (from 1 confederation)
- Venues: 4 (in 3 host cities)

Final positions
- Champions: Spain (9th title)
- Runners-up: Greece

Tournament statistics
- Matches played: 15
- Goals scored: 49 (3.27 per match)
- Attendance: 46,022 (3,068 per match)
- Top scorer: (Spain) Jesé (5 goals)
- Best player: (Spain) Gerard Deulofeu

The 2012 UEFA European Under-19 Championship was the 61st edition of UEFA's European Under-19 Championship (the eleventh since the age competition change to an Under-19 level) and took place in Estonia from 3 to 15 July. Spain were the defending champions. This competition also acted as a qualifying competition for the 2013 FIFA U-20 World Cup, as six sides from Europe qualify.

Players born after 1 January 1993 were eligible to participate in this competition.

== Qualification ==
Qualification for the final tournament occurred in two stages: a qualifying round and an elite round. During these rounds, 51 national teams competed to determine the seven teams that would join the automatically qualified host nation Estonia.

The qualifying round was played between 21 September and 16 November 2011. Liechtenstein did not enter and England, France and Spain received a bye to the elite round as a result of their UEFA ranking coefficient. The remaining 48 teams were divided into 12 groups of four teams, with each group being contested as a mini-tournament hosted by one of the group's teams. After all matches were played, the 12 group winners, 12 group runners-up and the best third-placed team advanced to the elite round.

The elite round was played between 23 and 31 May 2012. The 28 teams entering this phase were split into seven groups of four teams for a further round of mini-tournaments. The seven group winners qualified for the final tournament.

=== Qualified teams ===
The following eight teams qualified for the final tournament:

Country	Qualified as	Previous appearances in final tournament^{1} only U-19 era (since 2002)
Estonia	Hosts	0 (debut)
France	Winner of Group 1	5 (2003, **2005**, 2007, 2009, **2010**)
England	Winner of Group 2	6 (2002, 2003, 2005, 2008, 2009, 2010)
Serbia	Winner of Group 3	4 (2005^{2}, 2007, 2009, 2011)
Portugal	Winner of Group 4	4 (2003, 2006, 2007, 2010)
Greece	Winner of Group 5	4 (2005, 2007, 2008, 2011)
Croatia	Winner of Group 6	1 (2010)
Spain	Winner of Group 7	8 (**2002**, **2004**, **2006**, **2007**, 2008, 2009, 2010, **2011**)

^{1} Bold indicates champion for that year. Italic indicates host for that year.
^{2} As Serbia and Montenegro

== Venues ==
The host cities in Estonia.

Stadium	Location	Capacity	Notes
A. Le Coq Arena	Tallinn	9,692	Three group games, semifinals and the final
Haapsalu linnastaadion	Haapsalu	869	Three group matches
Kadrioru staadion	Tallinn	5,000	Three group matches
Rakvere linnastaadion	Rakvere	2,500	Three group matches

== Match officials ==
UEFA named six referees and eight assistant referees for the tournament on 18 June 2012, all who are young and upcoming top referees in Europe. Additionally two Estonian referees were chosen as fourth officials for the group stage matches.

Country	Referee
Denmark	Kenn Hansen
Italy	Paolo Valeri
Latvia	Vadims Direktorenko
Netherlands	Danny Makkelie
Northern Ireland	Arnold Hunter
Switzerland	Alain Bieri

== Results ==
2012 UEFA European Under-19 Championship teams and final classification

=== Group stage ===
The draw was held on 6 June 2012 in Tallinn, Estonia.

Each group winner and runner-up advanced to the semifinals. The top three teams in each group also qualified for the 2013 FIFA U-20 World Cup.

If two or more teams are equal on points on completion of the group matches, the following criteria are applied to determine the rankings.

1. Higher number of points obtained in the group matches played among the teams in question
2. Superior goal difference from the group matches played among the teams in question
3. Higher number of goals scored in the group matches played among the teams in question
4. If, after applying criteria 1) to 3) to several teams, two teams still have an equal ranking, the criteria 1) to 3) will be reapplied to determine the ranking of these teams. If this procedure does not lead to a decision, criteria 5) and 7) will apply
5. Results of all group matches:
  1. Superior goal difference
  2. Higher number of goals scored
6. Respect Fair Play ranking of the teams in question
7. Drawing of lots

Additionally, if two teams which have the same number of points and the same number of goals scored and conceded play their last group match against each other and are still equal at the end of that match, their final rankings are determined by the penalty shoot-out and not by the criteria listed above. This procedure is applicable only if a ranking of the teams is required to determine the group winner and the runner-up.

Legend
Advanced to semifinals and qualified for the 2013 U-20 World Cup
Qualified for the 2013 U-20 World Cup

All times are Eastern European Summer Time (UTC+3)

==== Group A ====
Team	Pld	W	D	L	GF	GA	GD	Pts
Spain	3	2	1	0	7	4	+3	7
Greece	3	2	0	1	8	5	+3	6
Portugal	3	1	1	1	8	6	+2	4
Estonia	3	0	0	3	1	9	−8	0

3 July 2012
17:30

Greece	1–2	Spain
Diamantakos 66'	Report	Jesé 30'; Derik 40'

Haapsalu Stadium, Haapsalu
Attendance: 1,350
Referee: Vadims Direktorenko (Latvia)
3 July 2012
20:45

Estonia	0–3	Portugal
	Report	Pikk 5' (o.g.); Betinho 25'; Martins 72'

Lilleküla Stadium, Tallinn
Attendance: 6,691
Referee: Kenn Hansen (Denmark)

6 July 2012
17:00

Estonia	1–4	Greece
Luigend 90'	Report	Katidis 43'; Fourlanos 55'; Diamantakos 85', 90+2'

Kadriorg Stadium, Tallinn
Attendance: 3,345
Referee: Danny Makkelie (Netherlands)
6 July 2012
20:00

Portugal	3–3	Spain
Bruma 11'; Gomes 39'; João Mário 90+1' (pen.)	Report	Jesé 8', 28', 48'

Lilleküla Stadium, Tallinn
Attendance: 3,780
Referee: Paolo Valeri (Italy)

9 July 2012
17:00

Spain	2–0	Estonia
Suárez 39'; Alcácer 86'	Report

Lilleküla Stadium, Tallinn
Attendance: 3,877
Referee: Arnold Hunter (Northern Ireland)
9 July 2012
17:00

Portugal	2–3	Greece
Gomes 19'; Betinho 90+6'	Report	Gianniotas 18'; Katidis 42', 69'

Haapsalu Stadium, Haapsalu
Attendance: 1,193
Referee: Alain Bieri (Switzerland)

==== Group B ====
Team	Pld	W	D	L	GF	GA	GD	Pts
England	3	2	1	0	5	3	+2	7
France	3	2	0	1	5	2	+3	6
Croatia	3	1	1	1	4	2	+2	4
Serbia	3	0	0	3	1	8	−7	0

3 July 2012
17:30

England	1–1	Croatia
Chalobah 60'	Report	Pavičić 57'

Kadriorg Stadium, Tallinn
Attendance: 1,270
Referee: Alain Bieri (Switzerland)
3 July 2012
18:45

Serbia	0–3	France
	Report	Samnick 17'; Pogba 26' (pen.); Vion 32'

Rakvere Stadium, Rakvere
Attendance: 1,827
Referee: Arnold Hunter (Northern Ireland)

6 July 2012
16:30

France	1–0	Croatia
Foulquier 79'	Report

Haapsalu Stadium, Haapsalu
Attendance: 1,182
Referee: Vadims Direktorenko (Latvia)
6 July 2012
17:30

Serbia	1–2	England
Ninković 70'	Report	Afobe 6'; Redmond 63'

Rakvere Stadium, Rakvere
Attendance: 1,712
Referee: Kenn Hansen (Denmark)

9 July 2012
20:00

Croatia	3–0	Serbia
Pavičić 2'; Pongračić 49', 57'	Report

Rakvere Stadium, Rakvere
Attendance: 1,647
Referee: Paolo Valeri (Italy)
9 July 2012
20:00

France	1–2	England
Veretout 31'	Report	Lundstram 16'; Kane 39'

Kadriorg Stadium, Tallinn
Attendance: 3,234
Referee: Danny Makkelie (Netherlands)

=== Knockout stage ===
==== Bracket ====
Semi-finals
12 July – Tallinn
Spain	3 (4)
France	3 (2)
12 July – Tallinn
England	1
Greece	2

Final
15 July – Tallinn
Spain	1
Greece	0

==== Semi-finals ====
12 July 2012
16:45

England	1–2 (a.e.t.)	Greece
Afobe 56'	Report	Bougaidis 38'; Lykogiannis 108'

Lilleküla Stadium, Tallinn
Attendance: 3,115
Referee: Kenn Hansen (Denmark)

12 July 2012
20:00

Spain	3–3 (a.e.t.)	France
Deulofeu 62', 112'; Alcácer 78'	Report	Umtiti 26', 90+1'; Pogba 117'
Penalties
Campaña (penalty missed); Suárez (penalty scored); Jesé (penalty scored); Alcácer (penalty scored); Deulofeu (penalty scored)	4–2	(penalty scored) Pogba; (penalty scored) Pléa; (penalty missed) Umtiti; (penalty missed) Kondogbia

Lilleküla Stadium, Tallinn
Attendance: 4,325
Referee: Arnold Hunter (Northern Ireland)

==== Final ====
15 July 2012
21:30

Spain	1–0	Greece
Jesé 80'	Report

Lilleküla Stadium, Tallinn
Attendance: 7,864
Referee: Danny Makkelie (Netherlands)

Spain
GK	1	Kepa Arrizabalaga (yellow card) 90+2'
DF	3	Álex Grimaldo
DF	4	Jonás Ramalho
DF	5	Derik
MF	6	José Campaña (c)
MF	8	Suso (substituted off) 71'
MF	9	Paco Alcácer
FW	10	Jesé (yellow card) 90' (substituted off) 90+1'
DF	12	Jonny
MF	16	Óliver
FW	14	Gerard Deulofeu (substituted off) 84'
Substitutes
GK	17	Adrián Ortolá
FW	7	Juanmi (substituted on) 84'
MF	11	Juan Bernat (substituted on) 90+1'
DF	14	Pablo Insúa
MF	18	Denis Suárez (substituted on) 71'
DF	19	Salva Ruiz
FW	20	Nono
Manager
(Spain) Julen Lopetegui

Greece
GK	12	Sokratis Dioudis
DF	2	Nikos Marinakis
DF	3	Kostas Stafylidis
DF	4	Mavroudis Bougaidis
MF	6	Panagiotis Ballas
FW	7	Charis Mavrias
MF	8	Spyros Fourlanos (substituted off) 85'
FW	9	Dimitrios Diamantakos (substituted off) 67'
MF	10	Giorgos Katidis (c) (yellow card) 78' (substituted off) 90'
DF	11	Giannis Gianniotas
MF	15	Dimitrios Kourbelis
Substitutes
GK	19	Panagiotis Tsintotas
DF	5	Konstantinos Triantafyllopoulos
MF	13	Konstantinos Rougalas
DF	14	Charalambos Lykogiannis
FW	17	Anastasios Bakasetas
MF	18	Andreas Bouchalakis
Manager
(Greece) Kostas Tsanas

2012 UEFA U-19 European champions

Spain
9th title

== Goalscorers ==
5 goals

- (Spain) Jesé

3 goals

- (Greece) Dimitrios Diamantakos
- (Greece) Giorgos Katidis

2 goals

- (England) Benik Afobe
- (Croatia) Domagoj Pavičić
- (Croatia) Mihael Pongračić
- (France) Paul Pogba
- (France) Samuel Umtiti
- (Portugal) Betinho
- (Portugal) André Gomes
- (Spain) Paco Alcácer
- (Spain) Gerard Deulofeu

1 goal

- (Estonia) Karl-Eerik Luigend
- (England) Nathaniel Chalobah
- (England) Harry Kane
- (England) John Lundstram
- (England) Nathan Redmond
- (France) Dimitri Foulquier
- (France) Richard-Quentin Samnick
- (France) Jordan Veretout
- (France) Thibaut Vion
- (Greece) Mavroudis Bougaidis
- (Greece) Spyros Fourlanos
- (Greece) Giannis Gianniotas
- (Greece) Charalambos Lykogiannis
- (Portugal) Bruma
- (Portugal) João Mário
- (Portugal) Daniel Martins
- (Serbia) Nikola Ninković
- (Spain) Derik
- (Spain) Denis Suárez

1 own goal

- (Estonia) Artur Pikk (against Portugal)

== Team of the tournament ==
After the final, the UEFA technical team selected 23 players to integrate the "team of the tournament".

Goalkeepers

- (Croatia) Simon Sluga
- (France) Alphonse Areola
- (Greece) Sokratis Dioudis

Defenders

- (England) Nathaniel Chalobah
- (France) Samuel Umtiti
- (France) Dimitri Foulquier
- (Greece) Mavroudis Bougaidis
- (Greece) Kostas Stafylidis
- (Spain) Álex Grimaldo
- (Spain) Derik Osede

Midfielders

- (Croatia) Domagoj Pavičić
- (France) Paul Pogba
- (Greece) Giorgos Katidis
- (Portugal) André Gomes
- (Spain) José Campaña
- (Spain) Saúl
- (Spain) Suso
- (Spain) Óliver Torres

Forwards

- (England) Benik Afobe
- (Greece) Dimitrios Diamantakos
- (Greece) Giannis Gianniotas
- (Spain) Paco Alcácer
- (Spain) Gerard Deulofeu
- (Spain) Jesé
