= Toni Vastić =

Austrian footballer

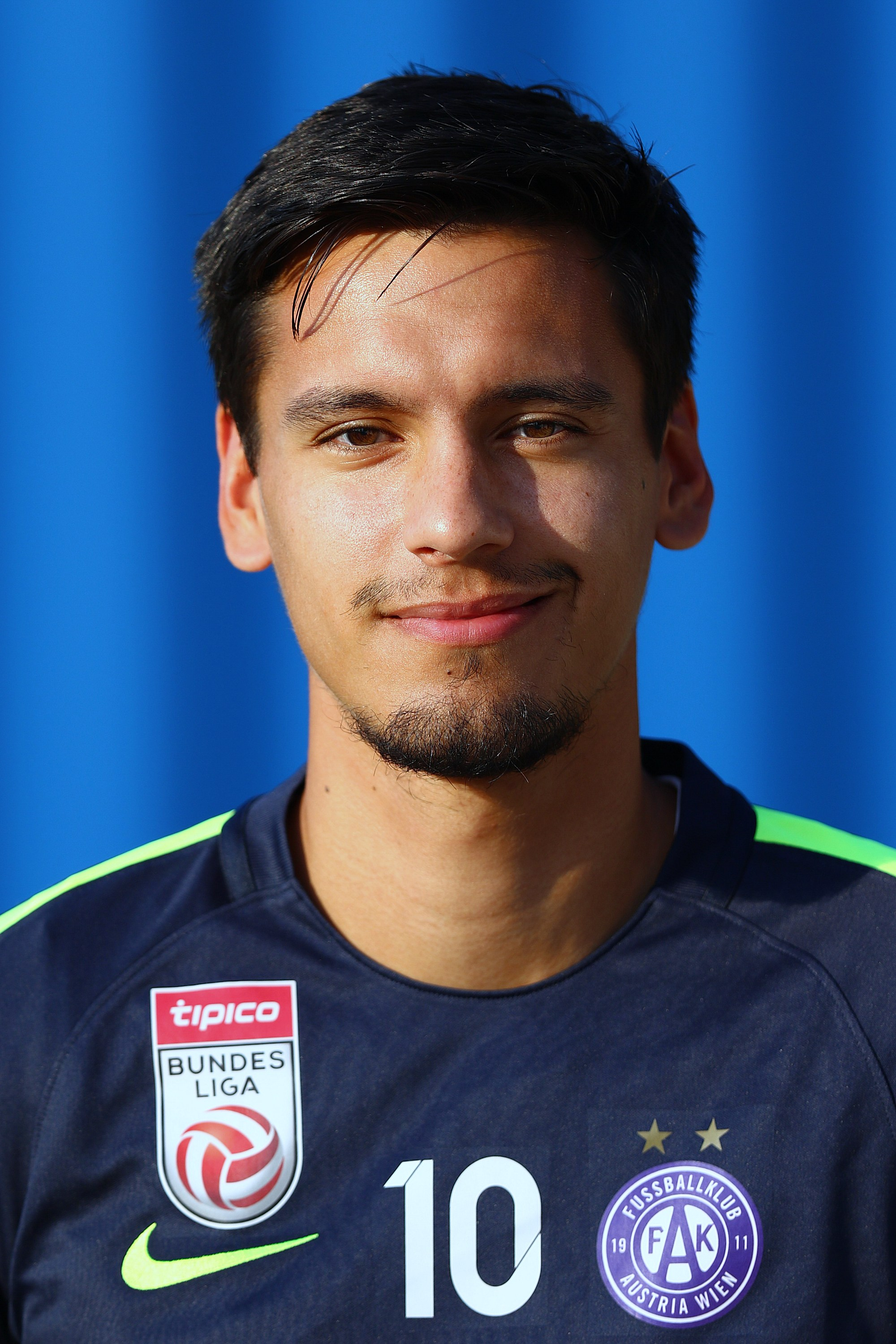

Personal information
- Full name: Toni Vastić
- Date of birth: 17 January 1993 (age 33)
- Place of birth: Vienna, Austria
- Height: 1.90 m (6 ft 3 in)
- Position: Forward

Team information
- Current team: VfR Aalen
- Number: 9

Youth career
- 2000–2003: Sturm Graz
- 2003–2005: Austria Wien
- 2005–2009: Fußballakademie Linz
- 2009–2011: Blackburn Rovers

Senior career*
Years	Team	Apps	(Gls)
2011–2013	Bayern Munich II	28	(5)
2013–2015	SV Ried	45	(5)
2015–2017	Admira Wacker	18	(3)
2017–2019	Austria Wien II	23	(9)
2018	Austria Wien	4	(0)
2019–	VfR Aalen	23	(7)

International career
2008	Austria U16	1	(0)
2009–2010	Austria U17	8	(1)
2011	Austria U18	8	(1)
2012	Austria U19	5	(3)
2012–2014	Austria U21	10	(4)
- * Club domestic league appearances and goals as of 12:37, 30 December 2020 (UTC)

Toni Vastić (German pronunciation: [ˈtoːni ˈvastɪtʃ]; born 17 January 1993) is an Austrian football forward who plays currently for VfR Aalen. He has previously played for Bayern Munich and Blackburn Rovers.

== Club career ==
In January 2015, after two years with SV Ried, Vastić returned close to his native Vienna and joined Admira Wacker on a free transfer. He signed a contract until 31 May 2016.

== Personal life ==
He is the son of former Austrian international Ivica Vastić. His younger brother Tin plays for Admira Wacker's U14 team.
