= Richard Samnick =

French footballer (born 1993)

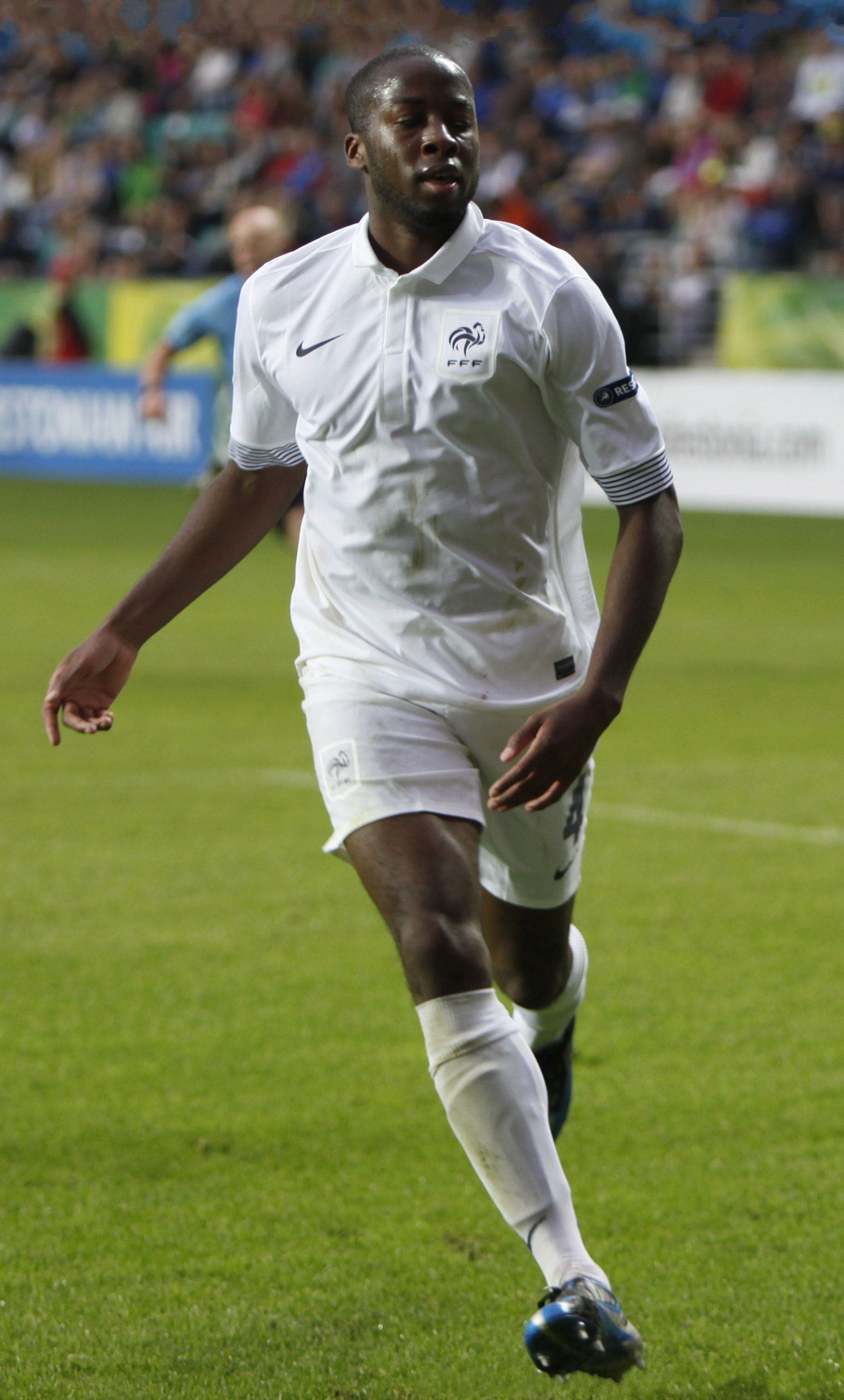
- Samnick with France U19 in 2012

Personal information
- Full name: Richard-Quentin Samnick
- Date of birth: 23 January 1993 (age 33)
- Place of birth: Noisy-le-Grand, France
- Height: 1.90 m (6 ft 3 in)
- Position: Defender

Youth career
- 2007–2011: Paris Saint-Germain

Senior career*
Years	Team	Apps	(Gls)
2011–2013	Paris Saint-Germain B	27	(0)
2013–2015	Bari	9	(0)
2014–2015	→ Martina Franca (loan)	18	(0)
2015–2018	Châteauroux	56	(1)
2018–2020	Quevilly-Rouen	38	(2)
Total		148	(3)

International career
2011–2012	France U19	4	(1)
2012	France U20	3	(0)
- * Club domestic league appearances and goals

Richard-Quentin Samnick (born 23 January 1993) is a French former professional footballer who played for as a defender. A youth product of Paris Saint-Germain, he played senior football in Italy for Bari and Martina Franca and in France for Châteauroux and Quevilly-Rouen.

== Club career ==
After finishing his youth formation with Paris Saint-Germain, Samnick was assigned to the club's reserve squad in the 2011–12 season. After failing to feature regularly with the side, he joined Italian Serie B side Bari, signing a four-year deal with the Biancorossi.

On 23 August 2013 Samnick made his professional debut, starting in a 0–0 draw at Reggina. He spent the 2014–15 season on loan with Martina Franca in the Lega Pro. At the end of the season he terminated his contract with Bari two years early, and returned to France, signing for Châteauroux.

After three seasons at Châteauroux, the last being in Ligue 2, Samnick signed for Quevilly-Rouen on 21 June 2018. He was subsequently released by the club after two seasons. It proved to be the final club of Samnick's playing career, retiring at the age of 28.

== Personal life ==
Samnick's wife is from Châteauroux. As of January 2022, the couple have a daughter.

In December 2021, Samnick opened a gym in Châteauroux.

== Career statistics ==
Appearances and goals by club, season and competition
Club	Season	League			National Cup (Note: Includes the Coppa Italia and the Coupe de France)		Other		Total	
Club	Season	Division	Apps	Goals	Apps	Goals	Apps	Goals	Apps	Goals
Paris Saint-Germain B	2010–11	CFA	3	0	—		—		3	0
Paris Saint-Germain B	2011–12	CFA	11	0	—		—		11	0
Paris Saint-Germain B	2012–13	CFA	13	0	—		—		13	0
Paris Saint-Germain B	Total		27	0	—		—		27	0
Bari	2013–14	Serie B	9	0	2	0	—		11	0
Martina Franca (loan)	2014–15	Lega Pro	18	0	0	0	—		18	0
Châteauroux	2015–16	National	23	0	0	0	0	0	23	0
Châteauroux	2016–17	National	9	0	2	0	2 (Note: Appearance(s) in the Coupe de la Ligue)	0	13	0
Châteauroux	2017–18	Ligue 2	24	1	3	0	0	0	27	1
Châteauroux	Total		56	1	5	0	2	0	63	1
Quevilly-Rouen	2018–19	National	27	2	0	0	0	0	27	2
Quevilly-Rouen	2019–20	National	11	0	1	0	1	0	13	0
Quevilly-Rouen	Total		38	2	1	0	1	0	40	2
Career total			148	3	8	0	3	0	159	3

== Honours ==
Paris Saint-Germain U19

- Championnat National U19: 2010–11
