= Georgios Katidis =

Greek footballer (born 1993)

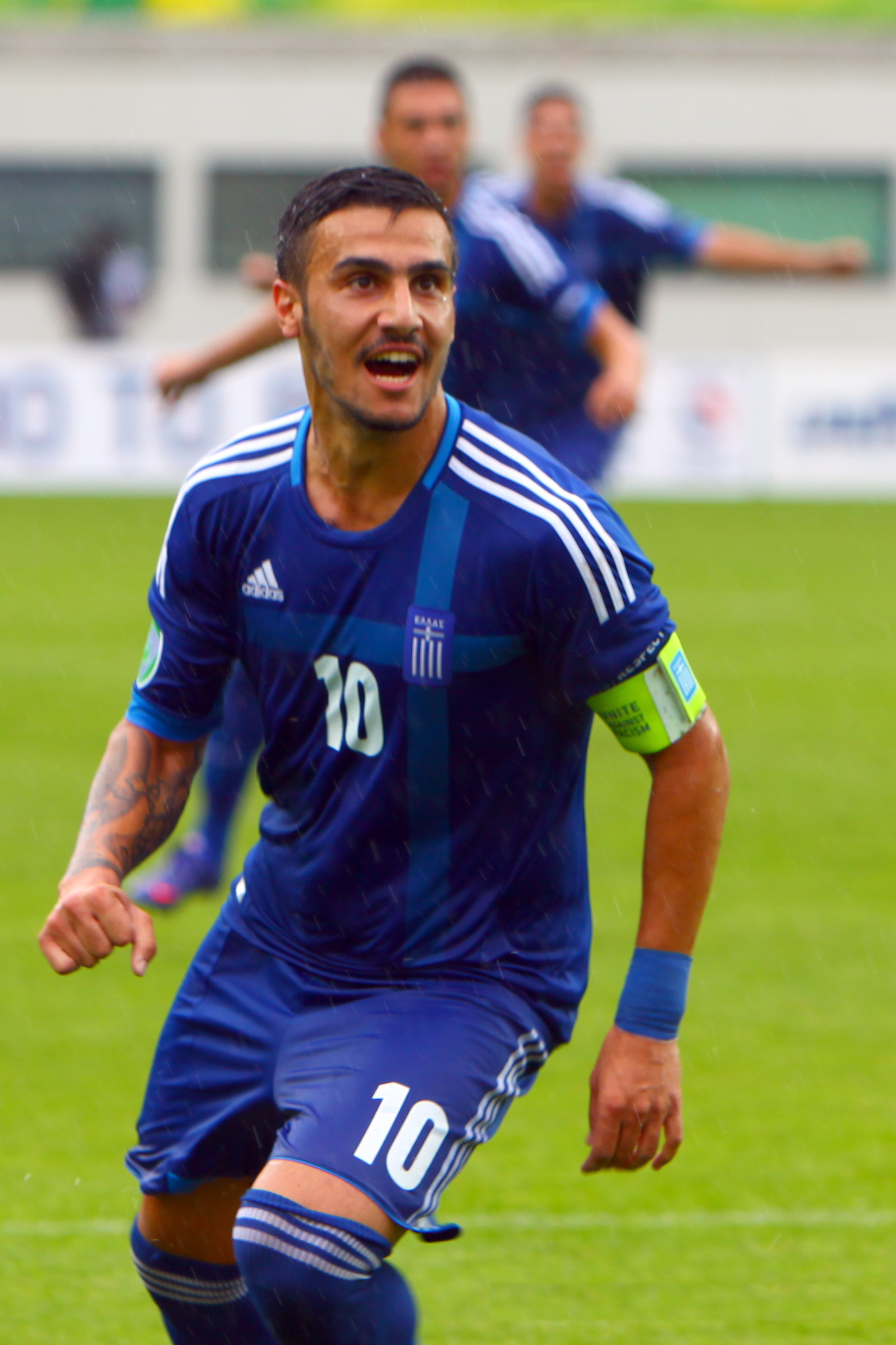
- Katidis with Greece in 2012 UEFA Euro U19

Personal information
- Full name: Georgios Katidis
- Date of birth: 12 February 1993 (age 33)
- Place of birth: Thessaloniki, Greece
- Height: 1.75 m (5 ft 9 in)
- Position: Attacking midfielder

Youth career
- 2008–2010: Aris

Senior career*
Years	Team	Apps	(Gls)
2010–2012	Aris	16	(0)
2012–2013	AEK Athens	21	(2)
2013–2014	Novara	10	(0)
2014–2015	Veria	6	(0)
2015	Levadiakos	9	(1)
2016–2017	Panegialios	14	(0)
2017	FF Jaro	15	(7)
2017–2018	FK Olympia Prague	22	(8)
2018	FK Příbram	10	(0)
2021–2022	Irodotos	11	(0)
2022	Proodeftiki	0	(0)
2022	Panelefsiniakos	1	(0)
2022–2023	Atromitos Piraeus	0	(0)
2023	AE Moschatou	0	(0)
Total		159	(25)

International career^{‡}
2009–2011	Greece U17	8	(2)
2011–2012	Greece U19	37	(13)
2012–2013	Greece U21	6	(1)
Medal record
Men's football
Representing Greece
UEFA European Under-19 Championship
Runner-up	2012 Estonia
- * Club domestic league appearances and goals as of 2 November 2026 ‡ National team caps and goals as of 2 November 2026

Georgios Katidis (Greek: Γεώργιος Κατίδης; born 12 February 1993) is a Greek professional footballer who plays as an attacking midfielder. He is best known for performing a Nazi salute after scoring a game-winning goal in 2013, which led to his permanent suspension from every level of the Greece national team and his suspension from AEK Athens for the remainder of the 2013 season.

== Club career ==
=== Aris ===
Katidis rose through the youth ranks at Aris and managed to make his debut for the team at 16 years old.

=== AEK Athens ===
On 27 August 2012, Katidis signed a four-year contract with AEK Athens which would keep him at the club until 2016. AEK Athens and his former club Aris agreed on a €100,000 transfer fee.

Katidis created an international controversy on 16 March 2013, when he gave a Nazi salute after scoring the winning goal against Veria. His action drew condemnation from politicians, fans and the media. He later told the public he was unaware of the gesture's connotations, stating that he just wanted to dedicate the goal to a colleague in the stands. AEK coach Ewald Lienen remarked that Katidis "doesn't have an idea about politics". As a result of the salute, the Hellenic Football Federation voted unanimously to give Katidis a lifetime ban from all Greece national teams and he was fined €50,000. He was furthermore suspended by AEK for the rest of the season.

=== Novara Calcio ===
On 29 June 2013, Italian Serie B side Novara signed Katidis. Novara's owner Massimo de Salvo said that they would not be 'playing down' the incident. "We don't have the intention to play down his gesture," he said. "It was disrespectful to the millions of people that suffered and paid with their lives for those who believed in false ideals and myths." De Salvo also said Katidis' remorse was a key factor in beginning negotiations with the 20-year-old. "We want to give him another chance, because we believe that making such a mistake is serious, but acknowledging it is worthy." The Italian media have dubbed Katidis the 'Greek Di Canio', referring to the former Lazio striker Paolo di Canio, who caused controversy by giving a Nazi salute whilst celebrating a goal. Eventually Katidis signed a 1+1 year contract with the club.

On 31 July 2014, Novara announced the end of cooperation with the player.

=== Veria ===
After being away from Greece for a year, Katidis returned to his home country by signing a two-year contract with Veria. Giorgos made his official debut on 20 September 2014 in an away loss against Olympiacos in Pireaus. He made his second appearance against Ermionida in the Greek Cup. He made his third appearance as a substitute as he replaced Sotiris Balafas against PAS Giannina. On 26 January 2015, Katidis was released by the club as he didn't impress with his performances.

=== Levadiakos ===
On 29 January 2015, Katidis penned a 2 1/2-year deal with fellow Super League Greece side Levadiakos. He made his last appearance with the club in a 1–0 away loss against PAOK.

=== Panegialios ===
On 10 January 2016 Katidis signed a year contract with Football League club Panegialios.

=== FF Jaro ===
On 30 January 2017, Katidis signed a season contract with the Finnish club FF Jaro. On 4 February 2017, in his first match with the club, Katidis was involved in FF Jaro goals by giving the two assists in a 2–1 Suomen Cup win against SJK. Two weeks later, he scored a brace in an 8–1 away win against SJK Akatemia for the Suomen Cup. On 4 March 2017, he scored a brace in a 6–1 home win against FC Jazz for the Suomen Cup. On 6 May 2017, he made his debut in the League with the club scoring in a 2–0 away win against EIF.

=== FK Olympia Prague ===
On 7 August 2017, Katidis left FF Jaro, signing a two-year contract with FK Olympia Prague of the Czech National Football League. On 12 August 2017, he made his debut with the club in a FNL 2–2 home draw against FK Viktoria Žižkov. On 27 August he netted the only goal in a 1–0 away win against Vlašim.

=== FK Příbram ===
On 11 July 2018, Katidis signed a two-year contract with 1. FK Příbram of the Czech First League .

=== Irodotos ===
On 18 September 2021, George Katidis returned to professional football after almost three years, signing for Super League 2 club Irodotos.

== International career ==
Katidis quickly became under 17, under 19 and then under 21 captain of Greece due to excellent performances while he was still playing for Aris FC. He was the captain of the under-19 team that lost in the final to Spain in the 2012 European Championship in Estonia. Scoring in a game on 16 March 2013, Katidis controversially celebrated the goal by giving the crowd a Nazi salute. Katidis later apologized. The Hellenic Football Federation imposed a lifetime ban on Katidis, banning him from participating in all Greek national teams.

== Honours ==
=== International ===
Greece U19

- UEFA European Under-19 Championship runner-up: 2012

=== Individual ===
- UEFA European Under-19 Championship Team of the Tournament: 2012
