= Daniel Martins (Portuguese footballer) =

Portuguese footballer

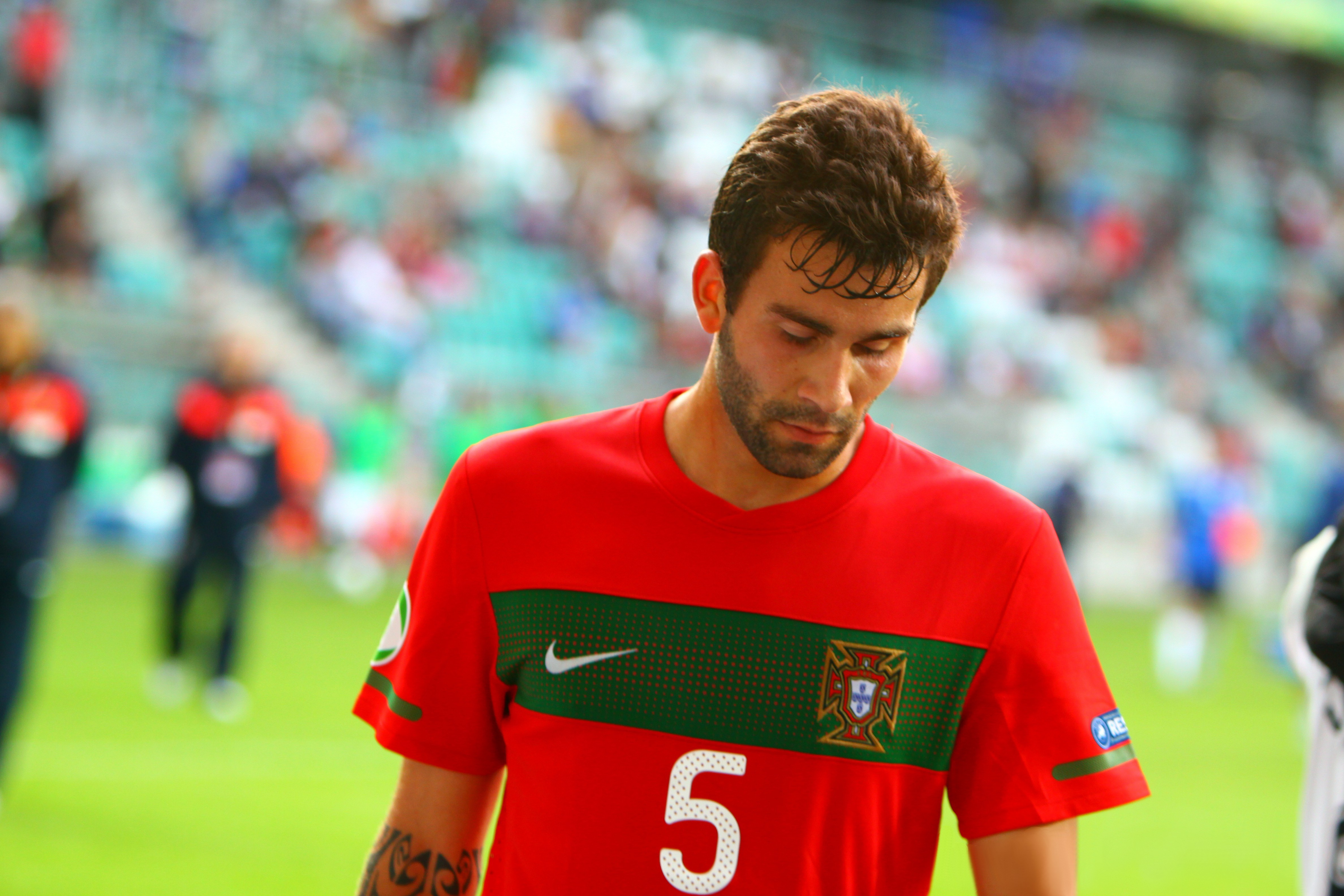
- Martins playing for Portugal U19

Personal information
- Full name: Daniel Santos Martins
- Date of birth: 23 June 1993 (age 33)
- Place of birth: Torres Vedras, Portugal
- Height: 1.87 m (6 ft 2 in)
- Position: Left back

Youth career
- 2006–2007: Torreense
- 2007–2012: Benfica

Senior career*
Years	Team	Apps	(Gls)
2012–2013	Benfica B	4	(0)
2013–2015	Belenenses	2	(0)
2013–2014	→ Beira-Mar (loan)	36	(0)
2015	→ Universitatea Cluj (loan)	2	(0)
2015–2019	Penafiel	81	(0)
2019–2020	Covilhã	16	(0)
2020	Créteil	6	(0)

International career
2009	Portugal U16	2	(0)
2009–2010	Portugal U17	15	(1)
2011	Portugal U18	6	(0)
2011–2012	Portugal U19	17	(1)
2012	Portugal U20	6	(0)
2013	Portugal U21	1	(0)
- * Club domestic league appearances and goals as of 12:28, 10 December 2020 (UTC)

Daniel Santos Martins (born 23 June 1993) is a Portuguese professional footballer who most recently played for French Championnat National club Créteil as a left defender.

== Club career ==
Martins was born in Torres Vedras, Portugal. On 30 January 2013, Martins signed with Belenenses.

Martins signed with Créteil in the French Championnat National in the summer of 2020. After a half-time incident in the Coupe de France match against JS Suresnes on 18 October 2020, in which it is reported that Martins physically attacked a staff member, he was suspended by the club on grounds of serious misconduct. On 12 November 2020 his contract was terminated.

== International career ==
He represented Portugal U19 in the 2012 UEFA European Under-19 Football Championship, where he played in all three of Portugal's group fixtures, scoring against Estonia in the opening game.
