= Dimitrios Diamantakos =

Greek footballer (born 1993)

Dimitris Diamantakos
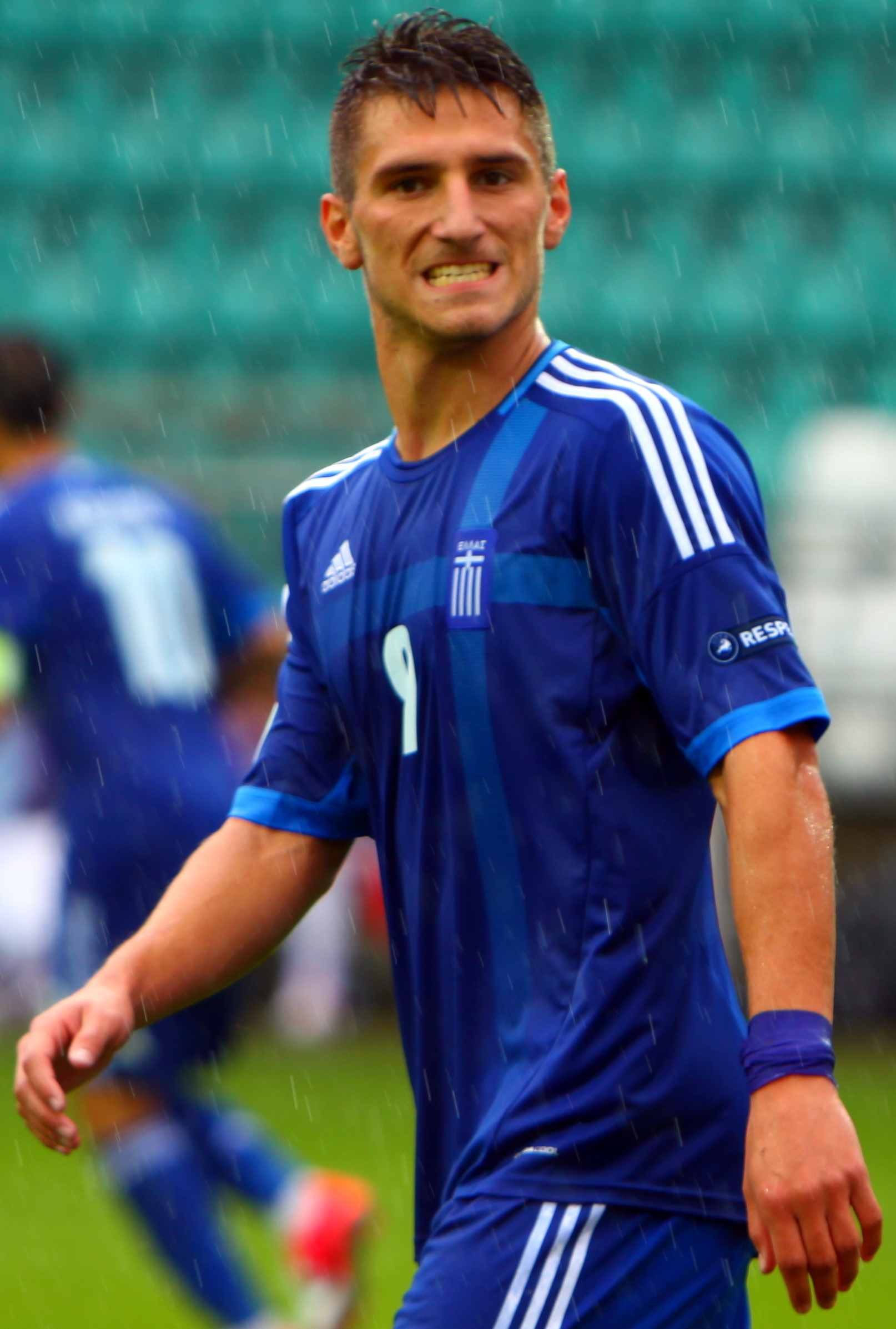
- Diamantakos with Greece U19 in 2012

Personal information
- Full name: Dimitrios Diamantakos
- Date of birth: 5 March 1993 (age 33)
- Place of birth: Piraeus, Greece
- Height: 1.82 m (6 ft 0 in)
- Position: Striker

Team information
- Current team: Anagennisi Karditsa
- Number: 16

Youth career
- –2009: Atromitos Piraeus
- 2009–2012: Olympiacos

Senior career*
Years	Team	Apps	(Gls)
2012–2015	Olympiacos	8	(2)
2012	→ Panionios (loan)	8	(0)
2013	→ Aris (loan)	13	(0)
2013–2014	→ Ergotelis (loan)	25	(9)
2015–2017	Karlsruher SC	50	(13)
2017–2018	VfL Bochum	9	(2)
2018–2020	St. Pauli	49	(19)
2020–2022	Hajduk Split	24	(2)
2022	→ Ashdod (loan)	9	(1)
2022–2024	Kerala Blasters	38	(23)
2024–2025	East Bengal	31	(12)
2025–2026	APOEL	18	(1)
2026–	Anagennisi Karditsa	5	(1)

International career^{‡}
2009–2010	Greece U17	12	(8)
2010–2012	Greece U19	24	(11)
2013	Greece U20	7	(2)
2012–2014	Greece U21	11	(5)
2014–2017	Greece	5	(0)
- * Club domestic league appearances and goals as of 21 February 2026 ‡ National team caps and goals as of 31 August 2017

Dimitrios Diamantakos (Greek: Δημήτριος Διαμαντάκος; born 5 March 1993) is a Greek professional footballer who plays as a striker for Super League Greece 2 club Anagennisi Karditsa.

== Club career ==
=== Olympiacos ===
Diamantakos started his career at Atromitos Piraeus, from which he moved to the youth teams of Olympiacos in 2009.

==== Loan spells ====
In 2012, he moved to Super League side Panionios on loan. In January 2013 he joined Aris on loan. He made 13 appearances without scoring any goal. In June 2013 he joined Ergotelis on loan. He had his best season so far by scoring 10 goals in 27 appearances in the league and in the cup.

=== Return to Olympiacos ===
Following his loan spell at Ergotelis, Olympiacos decided to keep him for the 2014–15 season. Diamantakos made his debut on 23 August 2014 with Olympiacos in the Super League on a home game against Niki Volos and managed to score his first goal in the 28th minute with a close range strike. In February 2015, according to Russian reports, Arsenal Tula was close to signing Dimitris Diamantakos. With the Russian transfer window still open the striker reportedly was in the club's shortlist.

Overall, he had little playing time in his first season with Olympiacos, having to settle for a role mainly on the bench. He scored 4 goals in 17 appearances across all competitions helping his club on its route to winning the Greek Cup.

==== Loan to Karlsruher SC ====
In August 2015, Diamantakos joined Karlsruher SC for the season, again on loan. On 6 November 2015, in his fourth appearance he scored his first goal for the club scoring in a 3–0 home win against VfL Bochum. On 12 December 2015, he scored his third goal in the league, helping his club return to winning ways against SpVgg Greuther Fürth. On 18 December 2015, Diamantakos scored for the third time in a row, sealing Karlsruhe's win away to FC St. Pauli.

=== Karlsruher SC ===
On 18 February 2016, Karlsruhe completed the permanent signing of the Greek striker for a reported transfer fee of €1 million. The transfer took immediate effect as the loan contract with Olympiacos was cancelled. On 20 February 2016, he scored the second goal helping his club to escape with a 2–2 home draw against Eintracht Braunschweig after teammate Ylli Sallahi had been sent off. On 3 April 2016, he scored in a 3–1 home win game against 1860 Munich. On 2 May 2016, Diamantakos scored twice as Karlsruher SC beat neighbours SV Sandhausen 3–0 to record a third successive home win.

Diamantakos scored his first goal of the 2016–17 season on the second matchday, in a 1–1 draw against VfL Bochum. On 18 September 2016, he scored the equalising goal in a 1–1 draw against FC St. Pauli. On 19 November 2016, he scored the leading goal for Karlsruhe, as they dominated in the first half of the game, but lacked the force and determination in the attack, facing an unexpected 1–3 loss from SV Sandhausen. On 2 December 2016, was the fateful player as he scored to a penalty kick reducing the score, and missed the decisive penalty and the chance to tie up the game in a 2–1 home loss against Greuther Fürth. On 4 March 2017, he scored with a penalty kick sealing a 2–0 win home for his club against Hannover 96 in his club effort to avoid relegation.

=== VfL Bochum ===
On 10 June 2017, after the relegation of Karlsruher SC, VfL Bochum announced signing Diamantakos for the 2017–18 season.

=== FC St. Pauli ===
On 25 January 2018, it was announced Diamantakos would sign with another 2. Bundesliga club FC St. Pauli on a 2 1/2-year contract until summer 2020, re-joining his former coach at Karlsruhe, Markus Kauczinski. He had been unable to secure a regular spot in the first-team lineup at Bochum. On 28 April 2018, he scored his first goal with the club in a 3–0 home win game against Greuther Fürth in his club's effort to avoid relegation. He started the 2018–19 season as a starter, in his club effort to be promoted to Bundesliga, but gradually lost his place in the starting XI, playing only few minutes as a late substitute. On 22 December 2018, he scored a brace as a substitute in a 4–1 home win game against 1. FC Magdeburg. On 27 April 2019, he scored in a 4–3 home win game against Jahn Regensburg. On 19 May 2019, he scored in a 2–1 away loss against Greuther Fürth after an assist from Finn Ole Becker. On 2 August 2019, he scored his first goal for the 2019–20 season in a 3–1 home loss against Greuther Fürth. On 31 August 2019, he scored a brace in the first half, in a 3–3 away draw against Dynamo Dresden. On 16 September 2019, he scored with a header after a cross from Mats Møller Dæhli and Marvin Knoll's failure to score as the ball hit the left post, and the Greek international got the rebound in a 2–0 home win game against Hamburger SV. On 2 November 2019, Diamantakos scored with two penalty kicks giving a two goals-lead in a frustrated 2–2 home draw game against Karlsruher SC. On 20 November 2019, he suffered a torn muscle fibre and will return to action after a period of two months. On 1 March 2020, he netted with a crisp drive after an assist from Marvin Knoll in a 3–2 home win game against VfL Osnabrück. A week later, he cutting inside before smacking a shot into the roof of the net, scoring a late goal after Borys Tashchy sealing a 2–2 away draw game against SV Sandhausen. On 30 May 2020, Diamantakos scored with a left footed shot from outside the box to the bottom right corner after Bjarne Thoelke's assist in a 1–1 away draw against his ex-club Karlsruher SC. On 21 June 2020, Diamantakos used a jumble in the Jahn Regensburg's defense to score his eleventh goal of the season, in a final 1–1 draw.

=== Hajduk Split ===
On 6 July 2020, free agent Diamantakos signed a three-year contract with Croatian club Hajduk Split.

==== Loan to Ashdod ====
On 6 January 2022, Diamantakos moved to Israeli side Ashdod on loan until summer 2022.

=== Kerala Blasters ===
==== 2022–23: Debut season ====
On 25 August 2022, Diamantakos completed a move to the Indian Super League club Kerala Blasters after terminating contract with his former club Hajduk Split. His Indian Super League debut with the Blasters came on 7 October 2022 in a 3–1 win against East Bengal on the opening day of the 2022–24 season. On 5 November, he scored his debut goal for the Blasters in a 3–0 win against NorthEast United FC in the 56th minute. Diamantakos' next goal came in their next match versus FC Goa on 13 November, where he netted a penalty in the closing moments of the first half as the Blasters won 3–1 against the Goan side. His goalscoring-spree continued as Diamantakos netted his third and fourth goal in the next two matches against Hyderabad FC and Jamshedpur FC on 19 November and 4 December respectively, where he scored the only goals for the Blasters as they won both the games 0–1 away from home. On 11 December, he scored his fifth consecutive goal of the season in a 3–2 win against the southern rivals Bengaluru FC and became the first ever player to score in five consecutive matches for the Blasters. He also assisted for Apostolos Giannou's goal in the 70th minute and won the Hero of the Match Award. His seventh goal for the Blasters came in the returning fixture against FC Goa on 22 January 2023, where he scored the only goal for the latter in the 51st minute but the Blasters lost the match 3–1 at full-time. On 18 February, Diamantakos became the second player in the Blasters' history to score ten goals, when he scored in the Blasters 2–1 defeat against ATK Mohun Bagan FC. He was then included in the Blasters' squad for the 2023 Indian Super Cup, and on 8 April, Diamantakos captained the club in first game of the tournament against RoundGlass Punjab FC in the absence of Jessel Carneiro and Adrian Luna. He scored the opening goal through a penalty kick in the 41st minute, as the Blasters won the match by the score of 3–1. Diamantakos scored his last goal of the tournament and the last goal of the season in their last Super Cup group stage match on 16 April against Bengaluru FC, where he scored a header in the 77th minute for the Blasters, as it helped them to avoid a defeat and the match ended in a 1–1 draw.

==== 2023–24: Becoming the club's all-time top scorer ====
After an impressive debut season with 12 goals in 24 matches, on 4 May 2023, Kerala Blasters announced that they have extended the contract of Diamantakos till 2024. He was included in the Blasters squad for the 2023 Durand Cup, but missed the entire tournament due to an injury. Diamantakos returned to the field on 1 October, in the second league game against Jamshedpur at home, by coming as a substitute in the 60th minute, in which he assisted for Adrian Luna's goal and helped the Blasters to win the match by the score of 1–0. He scored his first goal of the season against Odisha FC on 27 October, where he came in as a substitute for Rahul K. P. and scored the equalizer for the Blasters in the 66th minute, as the Blasters would go on to win the match 2–1 at full-time. On 4 November, in the away match against East Bengal, Diamantakos was shown a second yellow card, and was thus sent-off in the 89th minute, for removing his shirt after scoring the second goal of the Blasters that sealed them a 1–2 victory. On 29 November, Diamantakos scored a brace in a 3–3 draw against Chennaiyin FC. With this, he brought his goal tally to 16 and surpassed Adrián Luna and Bartholomew Ogbeche to become the all-time top-scorer for the club across all competitions. He would score his next goal against the newly promoted side, Punjab FC on 15 December, where he successfully converted a penalty, as it secured the Blasters a 0–1 win. On 24 December, Diamantakos scored a goal and provided an assist to Peprah in a 2–0 win against Mumbai City FC. During the match, he also surpassed Ogbeche's record to become the all-time top-scorer for the club in Indian Super League. Diamantakos' goal in the next match against Mohun Bagan Super Giant on 27 December helped the Blasters to defeat Mohun Bagan for the first-time in their history, and he also subsequently became the top-scorer of the league season just before the new year. Diamantakos would score three goals in three matches for the Blasters in the 2024 Indian Super Cup, where he scored two penalties against Jamshedpur FC on 15 January 2024 and his last goal against NorthEast United FC on 21 January, but they lost both matches 2–3 and 1–4 respectively before they crashed out of the tournament. His scoring spree would continue as he scored in the next league match after the international break on 2 February against Odisha in the 11th minute, but they lost the match 2–1. He was awarded with the golden boot for the season after scoring 13 goals for the Blasters, tying with Odisha FC's Roy Krishna but clinched the Golden Boot due to a superior goals-to-minutes ratio.

=== East Bengal ===
In May 2024, East Bengal announced the signing of Diamantakos after successful two seasons with Kerala Blasters. On 18 August 2025, he scored a brace in the Kolkata Derby against Mohun Bagan to seal a victory for the Torch Bearers.

On 1 September 2025, East Bengal announced they had mutually parted ways with Diamantakos.

=== APOEL ===
On 9 September 2025, Cypriot First Division club APOEL announced the signing of Diamantakos on a one-year contract.

=== Anagennisi Karditsa ===
On 25 September 2026, Diamantakos signed for Super League Greece 2 club Anagennisi Karditsa on a free transfer.

== International career ==
Diamantakos was a member of the Greek under-19 squad that earned second place in the 2012 UEFA European Under-19 Championship. He made his international debut for Greece on 7 September 2014 against Romania.

== Career statistics ==
=== Club ===
As of match played 12 April 2026

Appearances and goals by club, season and competition
Club	Season	League			Cup (Note: Includes Greek Cup, DFB-Pokal, Croatian Cup, Super Cup, Durand Cup)		Continental		Total	
Club	Season	Division	Apps	Goals	Apps	Goals	Apps	Goals	Apps	Goals
Olympiacos	2011–12	Super League Greece	0	0	0	0	0	0	0	0
Olympiacos	2014–15	Super League Greece	8	2	7	2	2 (Note: Appearance(s) in UEFA Champions League)	0	17	4
Olympiacos	Total		8	2	7	2	2	0	17	4
Panionios (loan)	2012–13	Super League Greece	8	0	1	0	—		9	0
Aris (loan)	2012–13	Super League Greece	13	0	0	0	—		13	0
Ergotelis (loan)	2013–14	Super League Greece	25	9	2	1	—		27	10
Karlsruher SC	2015–16	2. Bundesliga	24	8	0	0	—		24	8
Karlsruher SC	2016–17	2. Bundesliga	26	5	1	1	—		27	6
Karlsruher SC	Total		50	13	1	1	0	0	51	14
VfL Bochum	2017–18	2. Bundesliga	9	2	1	0	—		10	2
FC St. Pauli	2017–18	2. Bundesliga	10	1	0	0	—		10	1
FC St. Pauli	2018–19	2. Bundesliga	18	7	1	0	—		19	7
FC St. Pauli	2019–20	2. Bundesliga	21	11	1	1	—		24	12
FC St. Pauli	Total		49	19	2	1	0	0	51	20
Hajduk Split	2020–21	Prva HNL	19	2	1	0	2 (Note: Appearance(s) in UEFA Europa League)	0	22	2
Hajduk Split	2021–22	Prva HNL	5	0	1	0	2 (Note: Appearance(s) in UEFA Conference League)	0	8	0
Hajduk Split	Total		24	2	2	0	4	0	30	2
Ashdod (loan)	2021–22	Israeli Premier League	9	1	0	0	0	0	9	1
Kerala Blasters	2022–23	Indian Super League	21	10	3	2	—		24	12
Kerala Blasters	2023–24	Indian Super League	17	13	3	3	—		20	16
Kerala Blasters	Total		38	23	6	5	—		44	28
East Bengal	2024–25	Indian Super League	19	4	3	1	6 (Note: One appearance and one goal AFC Champions League Two, four appearances and four goals in AFC Challenge League)	4	28	9
East Bengal	2025–26	Indian Super League	—		4	3	—		4	3
East Bengal	Total		19	4	7	4	6	4	32	12
APOEL	2025–26	Cypriot First Division	18	1	2	0	—		20	1
Anagennisi Karditsa	2026–27	Super League Greece 2	0	0	0	0	—		0	0
Career total			252	75	29	14	12	4	313	94

=== International ===
Appearances and goals by national team and year
National team	Year	Apps	Goals
Greece	2014	1	0
Greece	2015	0	0
Greece	2016	3	0
Greece	2017	1	0
Total		5	0

== Honours ==
Olympiacos

- Super League Greece: 2014–15

Greece U19

- UEFA European Under-19 Championship runner-up: 2012

Individual

- Indian Super League Golden Boot: 2023–24
