= Giannis Gianniotas =

Greek footballer (born 1993)

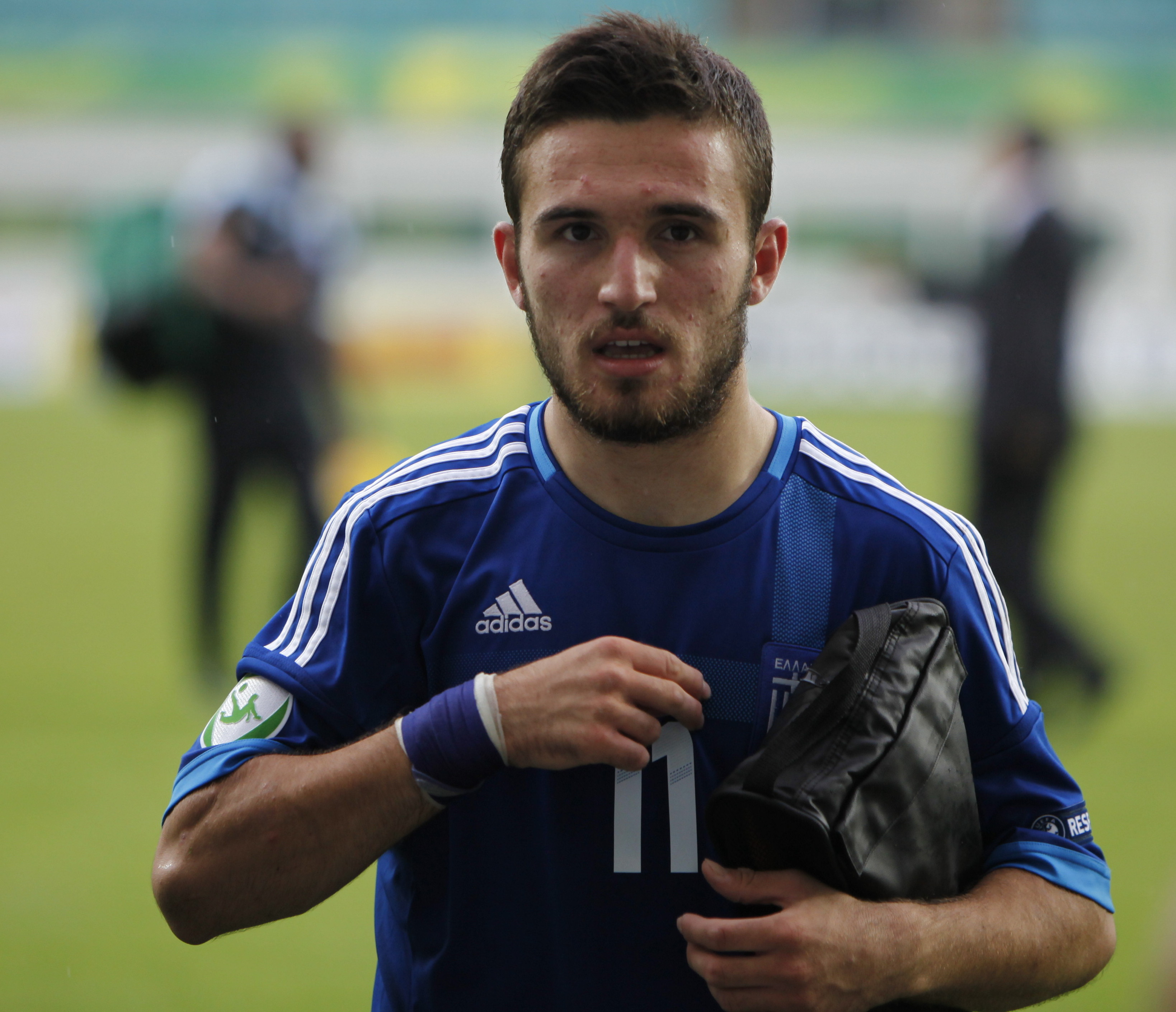
- Gianniotas with Greece U19 in 2012

Personal information
- Full name: Ioannis Gianniotas
- Date of birth: 29 April 1993 (age 33)
- Place of birth: Neochori, Chalkidiki, Greece
- Height: 1.74 m (5 ft 9 in)
- Position: Winger

Team information
- Current team: Aris
- Number: 70

Youth career
- 2008–2011: Aris

Senior career*
Years	Team	Apps	(Gls)
2011–2013	Aris	45	(8)
2013–2015	Fortuna Düsseldorf	8	(1)
2014–2015	→ Asteras Tripolis (loan)	28	(7)
2015–2018	Olympiacos	0	(0)
2015–2017	→ APOEL (loan)	46	(10)
2017–2018	→ Real Valladolid (loan)	29	(2)
2018–2019	AEK Athens	7	(0)
2019–2021	Apollon Limassol	43	(6)
2022	Apollon Smyrnis	13	(0)
2022–2025	Levadiakos	66	(10)
2025–	Aris	28	(1)

International career^{‡}
2009–2011	Greece U17	3	(0)
2011–2013	Greece U19	8	(2)
2013	Greece U20	6	(0)
2012–2015	Greece U21	12	(3)
2015–2018	Greece	9	(2)
- * Club domestic league appearances and goals as of 19 September 2026 ‡ National team caps and goals as of 28 March 2018

Giannis Gianniotas (Greek: Γιάννης Γιαννιώτας; born 29 April 1993) is a Greek professional footballer who plays as a winger for Super League club Aris.

== Club career ==
=== Aris ===
==== 2011–12 season ====
Born in Neochori, Greece, Gianniotas started his career in youth teams of Aris. In 2011, new head coach Michał Probierz promoted him to the first team, and he made his debut on 5 November 2011, in a game against Olympiacos. He scored his first goal for Aris only during his second appearance for the team, in a game against OFI. For that performance, he was named MVP of matchday 10 in the Greek Super League. He scored another goal against Levadeiakos, and this one was named the best for the matchday 4. He also scored against Panetolikos in a 5–1 away loss. In total he scored three goals and he made 19 appearances.

==== 2012–13 season ====
His first goal for this season came against Panathinaikos in a 1–1 away draw. His next goal came against PAS Giannina in a 1–2 home loss. He also scored against Asteras Tripolis in a 1–1 away draw. He managed to score in a Greek Cup match against Kallithea in a 3–1 away loss.

=== Fortuna Düsseldorf ===
In June 2013, he was transferred to Fortuna Düsseldorf. His previous club Aris received 450,000 euros for the transfer. He chose the jersey with the number "22" on the back, and signed a contract until 2016. "The people of Fortuna are keen for this transfer, I came to a great club with a great stadium", said the former Aris forward. "I always wanted to play in Germany," he said and concluded: "I hope that I can help Fortuna Düsseldorf to return in Bundesliga". On 30 August 2014 the Rhinelander agreed with the Greek first division Asteras Tripolis on a lending transaction until 30 June 2015.

==== Asteras Tripolis ====
On 22 March 2015 after a remarkable season with the club, Giannis Gianniotas became the 1st player of Asteras Tripolis that was called to play for the Greece national team.

On 23 March 2015, Gianotas alleged to have verbally agreed to Greek champions Olympiacos and seems that Fortuna Düsseldorf which has the player's rights contents to this transfer. Giannotas has another year contract with the German club. Fortuna Düsseldorf, which is trying for a rise to Bundesliga has no problem to release the Greek footballer, without being known if will claim an amount for transcription. It is noted that the situation should be clarified in the coming days. On 5 June 2015, Olympiacos reached an agreement with Fortuna Düsseldorf for the transfer of Giannis Gianniotas. The Greek international signed a 4-year contract worth €400,000 per year with the Greek champions, that will be pay Fortuna Düsseldorf €500,000 as a transfer fee.

=== Olympiacos ===
On 17 June, Olympiacos officially announced the transfer of Giannis Gianniotas from Fortuna Düsseldorf, adding another high-caliber Greek talent to their squad.

==== APOEL ====
On 31 December 2015, Gianniotas joined Cypriot club APOEL on a six-months loan deal, until the end of the 2015–16 season. He made his debut on 10 January 2016, starting the match and playing for 65 minutes in APOEL's 2–1 away victory against Aris Limassol for the Cypriot First Division. He scored his first official goal for APOEL on 17 January 2016, in his team's 3–0 home win against Enosis Neon Paralimni for the Cypriot First Division. On 28 April 2016, Gianniotas scored with a penalty kick against title rivals AEK Larnaca, and sealed the victory which secured his team's fourth consecutive Cypriot First Division title and the first title of his career.

On 12 July 2016, APOEL agreed with Olympiacos to extend Gianniotas loan for one more year, until the end of the 2016–17 season. On 2 August 2016, he scored the opening goal in APOEL's 3–0 home victory against Rosenborg BK for the third qualifying round of the UEFA Champions League, to help his team overturn a 2–1 loss in Norway and reach the play-off round of the competition. On 16 February 2017, he scored APOEL's second goal one minute before the end, in his team's 3–2 defeat from Athletic Bilbao at San Mamés, for the first leg of the UEFA Europa League round of 32. One week later, he scored again from the penalty spot, as APOEL beat Athletic Bilbao 2–0 at home and advanced to the last 16 of the UEFA Europa League for the first time in their history.

==== Real Valladolid ====
On 25 August 2017 Gianniotas joined Real Valladolid on a season-long loan. On 16 September 2017, in his debut with the club he scored with a right footed shot from the centre of the box to the bottom right corner, after an assist from Míchel, giving a lead of two goals in a 2–1 home win game against Granada. On 12 October 2017, just a couple of days after his international goal against Gilbraltar, few minutes after his entrance in the match, Gianniotas left his imprint with a solo goal, which sealed a 4–0 home win against Alcorcón. According to reports from Spain, Real Valladolid after Gianniotas solid performances with the club want to make the loan move of right winger from Olympiacos permanent in the summer. The current contract of 25-year-old international winger with the Reds expires in the summer of 2019 and it will not be extended. He had an excellent season, helping the club to be promoted in La Liga.

=== AEK Athens ===
On 29 August 2018, Gianniotas joined AEK Athens as a free transfer on a three-year contract for an undisclosed fee. On 31 October 2018, Alef calmly slid the ball into the left corner after collecting Stratos Svarnas’ accurate pass and Gianniotas’ scored his first goal with the club, to double AEK's lead in a 4–0 away Greek Cup win.

=== Apollon Limassol ===
On 27 June 2019, Apollon Limassol signed him for the next two years and caught all the Greeks clubs that had expressed interest along with Aris and Atromitos.

=== Apollon Smyrnis ===
On 4 January 2022, Greek side Apollon Smyrnis, via his official website, informed about the acquisition of Giannotas from Apollon Limassol on a free transfer. The winger, after passing the medical tests, signed a contract with the Greek club valid until June 30, 2023.

=== Levadiakos ===
On 30 September 2022, Gianniotas joined Levadiakos.

=== Aris ===
On 25 June 2025, Gianniotas joined again Aris.

== International career ==
Gianniotas made his international debut on 29 March 2015, in Greece's 0–0 away draw against Hungary for the UEFA Euro 2016 qualifiers. On 1 September 2016, he scored the winner in Greece's friendly 2–1 away win against Netherlands, pouncing on a rebound that Dutch keeper Jeroen Zoet let spill into a dangerous area. On 9 June 2017, after the final whistle in a 0–0 away draw for 2018 FIFA World Cup qualifiers against Bosnia, Gianniotas had a tooth knocked out by one of Bosnia Herzegovina’s assistant coaches (French national Stéphane Gilli) as tempers flared. It remains to be seen what action FIFA or UEFA will take against Bosnia, but on the video evidence, which clearly shows Gianniotas attacking first with a kick and then the punch from Stéphane Gilli which did the damage knocking out a tooth, both associations could be sanctioned. Since the incident Bosnian football association has issued an apology. Stéphane Gilli has expressed regret in aftermath. A Bosnian former player and current chief director at AEK Athens Dušan Bajević, has said "This is a slap in the face for Bosnia".

== Career statistics ==
=== Club ===
As of 26 June 2025

Appearances and goals by club, season and competition
Club	Season	League			Cup		Continental		Other		Total	
Club	Season	Division	Apps	Goals	Apps	Goals	Apps	Goals	Apps	Goals	Apps	Goals
Aris	2011–12	Super League Greece	19	3	1	0	—		—		20	3
Aris	2012–13	Super League Greece	26	5	2	1	—		—		28	6
Aris	Total		45	8	3	1	—		—		48	9
Fortuna Düsseldorf	2013–14	2. Bundesliga	8	1	0	0	—		—		8	1
Asteras Tripolis (loan)	2014–15	Super League Greece	28	4	3	2	5 (Note: Appearances in UEFA Europa League)	0	—		36	6
Olympiacos	2015–16	Super League Greece	0	0	1	0	0 (Note: Appearances in UEFA Champions League)	0	—		1	0
APOEL (loan)	2015–16	Cypriot First Division	17	5	3	0	—		—		20	5
APOEL (loan)	2016–17	Cypriot First Division	29	5	5	0	14 (Note: Appearances in UEFA Champions League and UEFA Europa League)	3	1 (Note: Appearances in Cypriot Super Cup)	0	49	8
APOEL (loan)	Total		46	10	8	0	14	3	1	0	69	13
Valladolid (loan)	2017–18	Segunda División	29	2	3	1	—		—		32	3
AEK Athens	2018–19	Super League Greece	7	0	4	1	2	0	—		13	1
Apollon Limassol	2019–20	Cypriot First Division	16	3	3	0	7	1	—		26	4
Apollon Limassol	2020–21	Cypriot First Division	27	3	1	0	3	1	—		31	4
Apollon Limassol	Total		43	6	4	0	10	2	—		57	8
Apollon Smyrnis	2021–22	Super League Greece	13	0	0	0	—		—		13	0
Levadiakos	2022–23	Super League Greece	16	2	1	0	—		—		17	2
Levadiakos	2023–24	Super League Greece 2	27	5	3	0	—		—		30	5
Levadiakos	2024–25	Super League Greece	23	3	1	1	—		—		24	4
Levadiakos	Total		66	10	5	1	0	0	0	0	71	11
Total			285	31	31	6	31	5	1	0	337	52

=== International ===
As of 28 March 2018

Greece
Year	Apps	Goals
2015	1	0
2016	5	1
2017	1	1
2018	2	0
Total	9	2

==== International goals ====
Scores and results list Greece's goal tally first.

#	Date	Venue	Opponent	Score	Result	Competition
1.	1 September 2016	Philips Stadion, Eindhoven, Netherlands	Netherlands	2–1	2–1	Friendly
2.	10 October 2017	Karaiskakis Stadium, Piraeus, Greece	Gibraltar	4–0	4–0	2018 FIFA World Cup qualification

== Honours ==
APOEL

- Cypriot First Division: 2015–16, 2016–17

=== International ===
Greece U19

- UEFA European Under-19 Championship runner-up: 2012

=== Individual ===
- UEFA European Under-19 Championship Team of the Tournament: 2012
