= Betinho (footballer, born 1993) =

Portuguese footballer

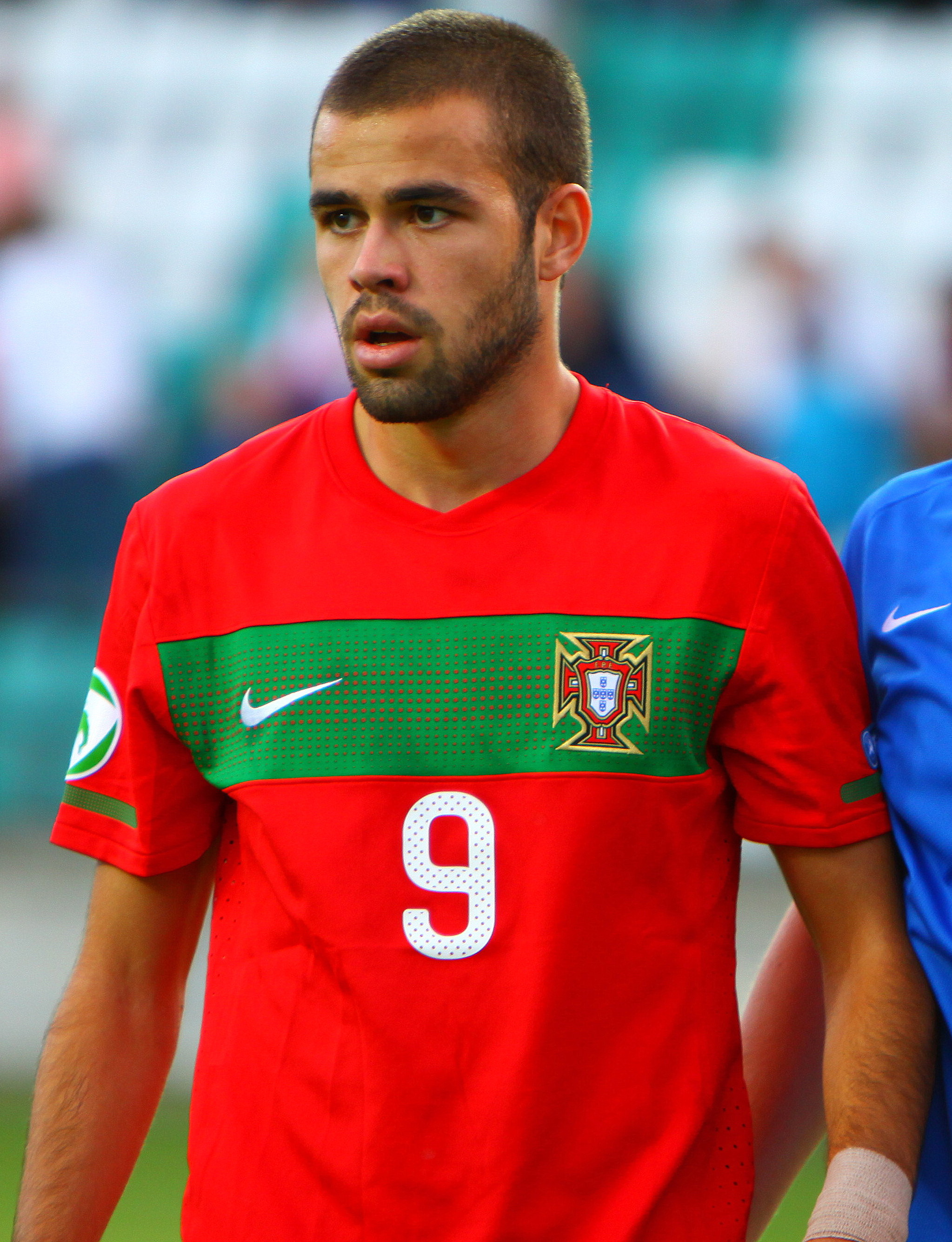
- Betinho with Portugal U19 in 2012

Personal information
- Full name: Alberto Alves Coelho
- Date of birth: 21 July 1993 (age 33)
- Place of birth: Santa Maria de Lamas, Portugal
- Height: 1.79 m (5 ft 10 in)
- Position: Striker

Youth career
- 2002–2004: União Lamas
- 2004–2012: Sporting CP

Senior career*
Years	Team	Apps	(Gls)
2011–2015	Sporting CP	3	(0)
2012–2015	Sporting CP B	50	(16)
2014	→ Vitória Setúbal (loan)	8	(0)
2014–2015	→ Brentford (loan)	1	(0)
2015–2019	Belenenses	5	(0)
2016	→ Sporting CP B (loan)	16	(4)
2017–2018	→ União Madeira (loan)	18	(5)
2018–2019	→ Lusitânia (loan)	8	(4)
2019–2023	Espinho	57	(19)
2023–2024	Dragões Sandinenses		
Total		166	(48)

International career
2007–2008	Portugal U15	3	(1)
2008–2009	Portugal U16	9	(7)
2009–2010	Portugal U17	12	(2)
2010–2012	Portugal U19	20	(14)
2012–2013	Portugal U20	9	(0)
2013	Portugal U21	4	(2)
- * Club domestic league appearances and goals

Alberto Alves Coelho (born 21 July 1993), known as Betinho, is a Portuguese former professional footballer who played as a striker.

== Club career ==
=== Sporting CP ===
Born in Santa Maria de Lamas, Aveiro District, Betinho signed for Sporting CP at the age of 11, from local C.F. União de Lamas. He then proceeded to play for every youth side at the club.

On 14 December 2011, Betinho was called for a UEFA Europa League group stage game away against S.S. Lazio, alongside youth graduates Ricardo Esgaio, Tiago Ilori, João Carlos and João Mário, as the Lions had already secured the first place in their group. He remained an unused substitute in the 2–0 loss.

Betinho started the 2012–13 season with Sporting's reserves, in the Segunda Liga. He made his debut as a professional on 18 August by playing three minutes in a 1–0 home win against Vitória S.C. B, and scored his first goal in the competition four days later in the 2–1 home victory over S.C. Covilhã. Late into the following month he made his first Primeira Liga appearance, replacing André Carrillo in the 74th minute of an eventual 2–2 home draw with G.D. Estoril Praia.

Betinho was part of the under-19 side that finished third at the 2012–13 NextGen Series. During the first part of the 2013–14 campaign, he scored nine second-division goals for Sporting B.

In January 2014, Betinho joined Vitória F.C. of the top flight on loan until June. He played just four minutes in his first match, a 1–0 defeat at Gil Vicente F.C. on 2 March.

On 1 September 2014, Betinho moved to English Championship side Brentford on a season-long loan, to cover for the injured Scott Hogan; manager Mark Warburton had previously been impressed by his performances in the NextGen Series, a competition he helped organise, and described the player as "quick, strong and technically gifted". International clearance problems meant he was only included in the squad for the match against Norwich City on 16 September, and he made his debut in the 0–3 home loss by replacing Stuart Dallas after 77 minutes.

After remaining on the bench through most first-team games in late September, October and then being left out of the squad entirely, Warburton explained in early November that Betinho was working to adapt to the English game. Ultimately, he failed to win a call before the end of the season and instead spent time in the development squad, scoring three goals in six appearances.

=== Belenenses ===
Betinho signed a four-year contract with C.F. Os Belenenses on 12 August 2015, with Sporting retaining 60% of his economic rights. Having played only 350 minutes, he was loaned back to his former club five months later; this was his only possible destination having already represented them in the first game of the season.

On 11 August 2017, after having featured just three times in the preceding campaign, Betinho was lent to another second-tier team, C.F. União. Sixteen days later, he scored on his debut in a 2–2 home draw with Sporting B, having been put on at half-time by manager Paulo Alves.

Betinho left the Estádio do Restelo temporarily again in July 2018, for Lusitânia F.C. in his hometown.

=== Espinho ===
After reaching an agreement with Sporting and Belenenses, S.C. Espinho signed Betinho on 23 July 2019.

== International career ==
Betinho represented Portugal from under-15 to under-21 level. He had a prolific spell with the under-19 side, scoring 14 goals in 20 games and topping the 2012 UEFA European Under-19 Championship qualification chart at ten. He scored twice in the finals, with the national team exiting in the group stage.

Betinho was part of the squad that competed in the 2013 Toulon Tournament, helping the team to a fourth-place finish in spite of failing to score in three appearances. He made his debut for the under-21s on 5 September of that year, starting and netting in a 5–1 home rout of Norway in the 2015 European Under-21 Championship qualifiers.
