= 2013–14 Aris Thessaloniki F.C. season =

Aris Thessaloniki
- President: Lampros Skordas
- Manager: Giannis Chatzinikolaou (until 3 September 2013); Zoran Milinković (from 9 September 2013 until 20 December 2013); Soulis Papadopoulos (from 21 December 2013 until 26 March 2014); Foris Kakoglou (from 27 March 2014)
- Stadium: Kleanthis Vikelidis Stadium
- Super League Greece: 18th
- Greek Football Cup: Round of 32
- Top goalscorer: League: Michalis Manias (7); All: Michalis Manias (7)
Home colours	Away colours	Third colours

Aris Thessaloniki competed in the Super League. They started their Greek campaign after finishing 13th in last season's league and will enter the Greek Football Cup in the fourth round.

After the elections in Aris Members' Society, a new chairman, Dimitris Iliadis was appointed with the hope to face club's serious financial problems. Due to lack of appropriate licence from the Hellenic Football Federation Aris for the 2013–14 season could only sign three players being above 24 years old. Dimitris Iliadis resigned in December after the rumors that there was interest from an investor. Old president Lampros Skordas returned temporarily as president and eventually stayed until the end of the season.

About the manager, Aris Thessaloniki started the season with Giannis Chatzinikolaou. After the three defeats in the first three league games Giannis Chatzinikolaou left and was replaced by serbian Zoran Milinković. Along with the change of president, the team also changed its manager. Soulis Papadopoulos arrived in December. With confirmation of relegation Soulis Papadopoulos resigned. The season finished with Foris Kakoglou as manager and Giorgos Foiros, Dimitris Bougiouklis and Nikos Papadopoulos as assistants

== First-team squad ==
#	Name	Nationality	Position(s)	Date of birth (age)	Signed from
Goalkeepers
13	Sokratis Dioudis	(Greece)	GK	3 February 1993 (aged 21)	Club's Academy
32	Marios Gelis	(Greece)	GK	9 October 1994 (aged 19)	(Greece) Panserraikos
99	Stefanos Gounaridis	(Greece)	GK	15 June 1990 (aged 23)	Free Agent
Defenders
2	Michalis Kyrgias	(Greece)	CB	14 October 1989 (23)	(Greece) Apollon Smyrnis
3	Michalis Giannitsis	(Greece)	CB / RB	6 February 1992 (21)	Club's Academy
5	Rubén Pulido	(Spain)	CB / D	2 February 1979 (34)	(Greece) Asteras Tripolis
6	Charalampos Oikonomopoulos	(Greece)	CB / DM	9 January 1991 (22)	Club's Academy
14	Nikos Golias	(Greece)	CB / DM	29 July 1993 (19)	(Greece) A.O. Karditsa
18	Nikos Tsoumanis	(Greece)	LB	8 June 1990 (24)	(Greece) Kerkyra
21	Giorgos Margaritis	(Greece)	LB	20 June 1991 (22)	(Greece) Agrotikos Asteras
24	Kaloudis Lemonis	(Greece)	RB	11 November 1995 (17)	Club's Academy
32	Kristi Vangjeli	(Albania)	LB	5 September 1985 (28)	(Ukraine) FC Chornomorets Odesa
36	Nikos Psychogios	(Greece)	RB	25 February 1989 (24)	(Greece) Doxa Dramas
37	Valentinos Vlachos	(Greece)	RB	14 February 1992 (aged 22)	(Belgium) Club Brugge
44	Andreas Iraklis	(Greece)	CB / RB	16 May 1989 (24)	(Greece) Kallithea
47	Mavroudis Bougaidis	(Greece)	CB	1 June 1993 (aged 20)	(Spain) Granada B
Midfielders
4	Vasilios Karagounis	(Greece)	CM	18 January 1994 (aged 20)	(Greece) Olympiacos
7	Dimitris Sounas	(Greece)	CM / AM	12 August 1994 (18)	Club's Academy
8	Vassilis Triantafyllakos	(Greece)	CM / AM	16 July 1991 (22)	(Greece) Odysseas Anagennisis
10	Andreas Tatos	(Greece)	CM / AM	11 May 1989 (24)	(Greece) Olympiacos
12	Kostas Kotsaridis	(Greece)	CM	18 August 1992 (21)	(Greece) AEK Athens
19	Giannis Papadopoulos	(Greece)	CM	9 March 1989 (24)	(Germany) Dynamo Dresden
28	Petros Kaminiotis	(Greece)	CM	13 May 1989 (aged 25)	(Greece) Glyfada
30	Erotokritos Damarlis	(Greece)	DM	13 May 1992 (21)	Club's Academy
80	Antonis Tsiaras	(Greece)	DM	7 September 1993 (aged 20)	Free Agent
Forwards
9	David Aganzo	(Spain)	ST	10 January 1981 (32)	(Spain) Hércules
11	Nikos Angeloudis	(Greece)	ST	14 May 1991 (22)	Club's Academy
25	Tasos Bakasetas	(Greece)	SS	28 June 1993 (aged 20)	(Greece) Asteras Tripolis
29	Ilias Stavropoulos	(Greece)	RW / LW / SS	6 April 1995 (18)	Club's Academy
33	Michalis Manias	(Greece)	ST	20 February 1990 (23)	(Greece) Apollon Smyrnis
35	Nikos Kousidis	(Greece)	RW / LW	3 January 1993 (aged 21)	(Greece) Panathinaikos
77	Andi Renja	(Albania) / (Greece)	RW	1 June 1993 (20)	Club's Academy
93	Alexandros Karagiannis	(Greece)	LW	25 October 1993 (19)	Club's Academy

== Transfers and loans ==
=== Transfers in ===
Entry date	Position	No.	Player	From club	Fee	Ref.
June 2013	DF	2	(Greece) Michalis Kyrgias	(Greece) Apollon Smyrnis	Free	
June 2013	MF	19	(Greece) Giannis Papadopoulos	(Germany) Dynamo Dresden	Free	
June 2013	MF	86	(Slovenia) / (France) Rok Elsner	(Poland) Śląsk Wrocław	Free	
June 2013	GK	1	(Australia) / (Greece) Dean Bouzanis	(England) Oldham Athletic	Free	
June 2013	FW	33	(Greece) Michalis Manias	(Greece) Apollon Smyrnis	Free	
July 2013	DF	14	(Greece) Nikos Golias	(Greece) Anagennisi Karditsa	Free	
July 2013	FW	15	(Bulgaria) / (Nigeria) Chigozie Udoji	(Greece) Atromitos	Free	
July 2013	DF	18	(Greece) Nikos Tsoumanis	(Greece) Kerkyra	Free	
July 2013	FW	26	(Nigeria) / (Spain) John Ibeh	(Romania) Pandurii Târgu Jiu	Free	
August 2013	DF	22	(Greece) Aristotelis Karasalidis	(Greece) Panserraikos	Free	
January 2014	GK	99	(Greece) Stefanos Gounaridis	Free Agent	Free	
January 2014	FW	35	(Greece) Nikos Kousidis	(Greece) Panathinaikos	Free	
January 2014	MF	28	(Greece) Petros Kaminiotis	(Greece) Glyfada	Free	
January 2014	DF	31	(Albania) Kristi Vangjeli	(Ukraine) Chornomorets Odesa	Free	
January 2014	MF	80	(Greece) Antonis Tsiaras	Free Agent	Free	

=== Transfers out ===
Exit date	Position	No.	Player	To club	Fee	Ref.
June 2013	FW	20	(Greece) Giannis Gianniotas	(Germany) Fortuna Düsseldorf	500.000 €	
July 2013	GK	1	(Greece) Markos Vellidis	(Greece) PAS Giannina	Released	
August 2013	DF	4	(Greece) Grigoris Papazaharias	(Greece) Apollon Smyrnis	Released	
August 2013	MF	7	(Greece) Konstantinos Kaznaferis	(Bulgaria) Lokomotiv Plovdiv	Released	
September 2013	MF	17	(Greece) Manolis Papasterianos	(Romania) Concordia Chiajna	Released	
December 2013	FW	15	(Bulgaria) / (Nigeria) Chigozie Udoji	Free Agent	Released	
December 2013	FW	26	(Nigeria) / (Spain) John Ibeh	Free Agent	Released	
January 2014	MF	86	(Slovenia) / (France) Rok Elsner	Free Agent	Released	
January 2014	DF	20	(Greece) Stelios Tsoukanis	Free Agent	Released	
January 2014	GK	1	(Australia) / (Greece) Dean Bouzanis	Free Agent	Released	
January 2014	DF	22	(Greece) Aristotelis Karasalidis	(Greece) Paniliakos	Released	

=== Loans in ===
Start date	End date	Position	No.	Player	From club	Fee	Ref.
July 2013	End of season	MF	10	(Greece) Andreas Tatos	(Greece) Olympiacos	None	
August 2013	End of season	MF	4	(Greece) Vasilios Karagounis	(Greece) Olympiacos	None	
January 2014	End of season	DF	37	(Greece) Valentinos Vlachos	(Belgium) Club Brugge	None	
January 2014	End of season	DF	47	(Greece) Mavroudis Bougaidis	(Spain) Granada B	None	
January 2014	End of season	FW	25	(Greece) Tasos Bakasetas	(Greece) Asteras Tripolis	None	

== Staff ==
Position	Staff
Manager	(Greece) Foris Kakoglou
Assistant Coach	(Greece) Giorgos Foiros
Assistant Coach	(Greece) Dimitris Bougiouklis
Assistant Coach	(Greece) Nikos Papadopoulos
Fitness Coach	(Greece) Stavros Pantelidis
Fitness Coach	(Serbia) Radivoje Radakovic
Goalkeeping Coach	(Greece) Theodoros Kantas
Team manager	(Greece) Konstantinos Drampis
General manager	(Greece) Georgios Koltsidas
Head doctor	(Greece) Vaggelis Pantazis
Physio	(Greece) Giannis Gioris
Physio	(Greece) Giannis Mpontas
Youth team General manager	(Greece) Konstantinos Economidis
Scout	(Greece) Leonidas Vosdou

Last updated: 26 March 2013

== Competitions ==
=== Overall ===
Competition	Started round	Current position / round	Final position / round	First match	Last match
Super League	Matchday 1	—	18th	18 August 2013	13 April 2014
Greek Football Cup	Round of 32	—	Round of 32	26 September 2013	31 October 2013

Updated to match played 13 April 2014
Source: Competitions

=== Overview ===
Competition	Record							
Competition	G	W	D	L	GF	GA	GD	Win %
Super League	34	3	13	18	26	53	−27	8.82
Greek Football Cup	2	0	1	1	0	1	−1	0.00
Total	36	3	14	19	26	54	−28	8.33

Updated to match played 13 April 2014
Source: Competitions

=== Friendly matches ===
10 July 2013	Pirin	0–4	Aris Thessaloniki	Pravets
18:30			Michalis Manias 19', 29'; Nikos Angeloudis 55'; Robert Stambolziev 72'

13 July 2013	Litex Lovech	0–0	Aris Thessaloniki	Lovech Stadium
19:00

16 July 2013	Botev Vratsa	0–3	Aris Thessaloniki	Pravets
18:00			Nikos Angeloudis 1'; Andi Renja 69'; Stelios Tsoukanis 75'

21 July 2013	Ethnikos Gazorou	1–3	Aris Thessaloniki	Serres
18.00 UTC			Chigozie Udoji 60', 66', 77'

26 July 2013	Aris Thessaloniki	1–2	Roma	Thessaloniki
21:00	Chigozie Udoji 17'	https://www.gazzetta.gr/football/article/528114/deigma-thetiko-gia-ari (in Greek)	Dani Osvaldo 70'; Federico Balzaretti 80'	Stadium: Kleanthis Vikelidis Stadium

31 July 2013	Aris Thessaloniki	2–0	PAS Giannina	Thessaloniki
20:00 UTC				Stadium: Kleanthis Vikelidis Stadium

5 August 2013	Aris Thessaloniki	0–0	Veria	Thessaloniki
20.30 UTC +2				Stadium: Kleanthis Vikelidis Stadium

7 August 2013	Aris Thessaloniki	3–1	Episkopi	Thessaloniki
18.00 UTC +2				Stadium: Kleanthis Vikelidis Stadium

=== Super League ===
==== League table ====
Pos	Team	Pld	W	D	L	GF	GA	GD	Pts	Qualification or relegation
14	Platanias	34	10	8	16	39	48	−9	38 (Note: Head-to-head points: Platanias 8, Veria 5, Skoda Xanthi 3.)	
15	Veria	34	9	11	14	31	51	−20	38	
16	Skoda Xanthi	34	11	5	18	44	54	−10	38	Qualification for the Relegation play-off
17	Apollon Smyrnis (R)	34	9	9	16	43	54	−11	36	Relegation to Football League
18	Aris (R)	34	3	13	18	26	53	−27	22	Relegation to Gamma Ethniki (Note: Aris withdrew from the Football League due to financial reasons, hence they were relegated to Gamma Ethniki for the 14/15 season.)

Source: Super League Greece
Rules for classification: 1) Points; 2) Head-to-head points; 3) Head-to-head goal difference; 4) Goals scored; 5) Goals against; 6) Play-offs (neutral ground).
(Note: Criteria 6 is only used if needed to decide champion, teams for relegation or teams for UEFA competitions).
If in final league table there are still tied teams after applying criteria 1 to 5, a decision match (or matches if they are more than two) are to be played but only in three cases: to determine the champion, to fill spots in the play-off or to determine the teams to be relegated. In any other case, the final standings of tied teams are determined with a public draw.
(R) Relegated

==== Results summary ====
Overall								Home						Away					
Pld	W	D	L	GF	GA	GD	Pts	W	D	L	GF	GA	GD	W	D	L	GF	GA	GD
34	3	13	18	26	53	−27	22	1	10	6	8	18	−10	2	3	12	18	35	−17

Last updated: 13 April 2014.
Source: Super League

==== Results by matchday ====
Matchday	1	2	3	4	5	6	7	8	9	10	11	12	13	14	15	16	17	18	19	20	21	22	23	24	25	26	27	28	29	30	31	32	33	34
Ground	A	H	A	H	A	H	A	A	H	A	H	A	H	A	H	H	A	H	A	H	A	H	A	H	H	A	H	A	H	A	H	A	A	H
Result	L	L	L	D	L	D	W	W	L	L	L	L	D	D	L	D	L	L	L	D	L	D	D	W	D	L	D	L	D	L	L	L	D	D
Position	15	18	18	18	18	18	17	13	14	17	17	17	18	17	18	18	18	18	18	18	18	18	18	18	18	18	18	18	18	18	18	18	18	18

Updated to match(es) played on 13 April 2014. Source: Super League
A = Away; H = Home; W = Win; D = Draw; L = Loss; P = Postponed

==== Matches ====
18 August 2013 1	Apollon Smyrnis	2–1	Aris Thessaloniki	Athens
19:15	Panagiotis Korbos 13'; Antonis Petropoulos 63'	Report	Nikos Angeloudis 67'	Stadium: Georgios Kamaras Stadium; Attendance: 1,506; Referee: Georgios Kominis

25 August 2013 2	Aris Thessaloniki	0–2	AEL Kalloni	Thessaloniki
19:15		Report	Anestis Anastasiadis 11'; Jonan García 90+3'	Stadium: Kleanthis Vikelidis Stadium; Attendance: 7,926; Referee: Dimitrios Thanos

2 September 2013 3	Atromitos	2–0	Aris Thessaloniki	Athens
19:15	Chigozie Udoji 22' (o.g.); Stefano Napoleoni 38'	Report		Stadium: Peristeri Stadium; Attendance: 1,128; Referee: Konstantinos Ioannidis

15 September 2013 4	Aris Thessaloniki	1–1	Levadiakos	Thessaloniki
16:00	Tsoumanis (yellow card) 29'; Elsner (yellow card) 46'; Udoji 58'; Triantafyllakos (yellow card) 59'; Ilias Stavropoulos (yellow card) 84'	Summary	Ioannidis (yellow card) 25'; Manuel Martínez Lara (yellow card) 45'; Kapo 53'; Koné (red card) 74'; Mantzios (yellow card) 84'	Stadium: Kleanthis Vikelidis Stadium; Attendance: 7,379; Referee: Ilias Spathas

23 September 2013 5	Skoda Xanthi	2–0	Aris Thessaloniki	Skoda Xanthi Arena
19:30	Mantalos 23'; Solari 62'; Fliskas (yellow card) 73'	Summary	Iraklis (yellow card) 35'; Elsner (yellow card) 50'	Attendance: 1,541; Referee: Stefanos Mandakis

29 September 2013 6	Aris Thessaloniki	0–0	Panetolikos	Kleanthis Vikelidis Stadium
16:00	David Aganzo (yellow card) 89'	Summary	Rafael Bracalli (yellow card) 80'	Attendance: 7,241; Referee: Ioannis Topouzis

5 October 2013 7	Panionios	1–2	Aris Thessaloniki	Nea Smyrni Stadium
20:30	Kampantais (yellow card) 8' (goal) 58'; Mitropoulos (yellow card) 48'; Kolovos (yellow card) 57'; Nikos Giannakopoulos (yellow card) 60'; Kouros (yellow card) 90+4'	Summary	David Aganzo 62'; Udoji 88'	Referee: D.Styliaras

20 October 2013 8	Veria	0–1	Aris	Veria Stadium
16:00	Kaltsas (yellow card) 37'; Siontis (yellow card) 43'; Ostojić (yellow card) 48'; Georgiadis (yellow card) 80'; Anastasopoulos (yellow card) 90+3'	Summary	Iraklis (yellow card) 10'; Tatos (yellow card) 13'; Economopoulos (yellow card) 13' (yellow-red card); Udoji 61'; Kyrgias (yellow card) 73'; Elsner (yellow card) 77'; Rubén Pulido (yellow card) 77' (yellow-red card); David Aganzo (yellow card) 80' (yellow-red card)	Attendance: 1,845; Referee: (Greece) Mihail Voskakis

27 October 2013 9	Aris Thessaloniki	1–2	Platanias	Kleanthis Vikelidis Stadium
15:00	Udoji 72' (yellow card) 82'	Summary	Vasco Faísca (yellow card) 14'; Toni Moral (yellow card) 18'; David Torres 43'; Dimitris (yellow card) 61'; Stoller (yellow card) 75'; Goundoulakis 83'; Emídio Rafael (yellow card) 88'; Georgallides (yellow card) 90+2'	Attendance: 8,205; Referee: Aristomenis Koutsiaftis

3 November 2013 10	OFI	2–0	Aris Thessaloniki	Theodoros Vardinogiannis Stadium
19:30	Kalajdžić (yellow card) 14'; Carlos Milhazes (yellow card) 47'; Koutsianikoulis 53'; Ibeh 71' (o.g.)	Summary	Elsner (red card) 3'; Rubén Pulido (yellow card) 55'; Dioudis (yellow card) 56'	Attendance: 4,497; Referee: Ilias Spathas

9 November 2013 11	Aris Thessaloniki	0–2	Panathinaikos	Kleanthis Vikelidis Stadium
19:30	Stavropoulos (yellow card) 25'; Margaritis (yellow card) 53'; Kyrgias (yellow card) 77'; Psychogios (yellow card) 83'	summary	Abeid (yellow card) 9'; Klonaridis 43', 69' (yellow card) 72' (yellow-red card); Koutroumpis (yellow card) 90+1'	Attendance: 9,041; Referee: Anastasios Kakos

24 November 2013 12	PAOK	3–1	Aris Thessaloniki	Toumba Stadium
19:30	Kitsiou (yellow card) 41'; Salpingidis (yellow card) 42'; Tzavellas (yellow card) 54'; Lucas 72'; Athanasiadis 80'; Vukić 90'	Summary	Udoji (yellow card) 18' (goal) 59'; Damarlis (yellow card) 45+2'; Iraklis (yellow card) 54'	Attendance: 19,440; Referee: A.Sidiropoulos

1 December 2013 13	Aris Thessaloniki	2–2	Panthrakikos	Kleanthis Vikelidis Stadium
15:00	Manias 23'; Economopoulos (yellow card) 32'; Tsoumanis 62' (yellow card) 73'	Summary	José María Cases 6', 27'; Tzanis (yellow card) 30'; Jordão Diogo (yellow card) 84'; Seremet (yellow card) 90+3'	Attendance: 5,859; Referee: Georgios Kominis

7 December 2013 14	Ergotelis	3–3	Aris Thessaloniki	Pankritio Stadium
15:00	Chrysovalantis Kozoronis (yellow card) 58'; Badibanga 62', 90+5' (yellow card) 63'; Pelé 65' (yellow card) 87'	Summary	Kyrgias (yellow card) 64'; Tatos 69', 80' (yellow card) 87'; Damarlis 71'; Iraklis (yellow card) 73'	Attendance: 1,396; Referee: Stavros Tritsonis

15 December 2013 15	Aris Thessaloniki	0–2	Olympiacos	Kleanthis Vikelidis Stadium
19:30	Economopoulos (yellow card) 17'	Summary	Domínguez 6'; Siovas (yellow card) 23'; Weiss 27' (yellow card) 41'	Attendance: 7,692; Referee: Andreas Pappas

19 December 2013 16	Aris Thessaloniki	1–1	Asteras Tripolis	Kleanthis Vikelidis Stadium
19:30	David Aganzo 65'; Kyrgias (yellow card) 77'	Summary	Setti 27'; Kontoes (yellow card) 60'; Pol (yellow card) 73'; Juanma (yellow card) 89'	Attendance: 5,868; Referee: Stavros Mantalos

23 December 2013 17	PAS Giannina	2–1	Aris Thessaloniki	Zosimades Stadium
19:30	De Vincenti (yellow card) 23' (goal) 51' (pen.); Dasios (red card) 44'; Lila 73'	Summary	Tatos (red card) 44'; David Aganzo (yellow card) 45'; Papadopoulos (yellow card) 50'; Iraklis (yellow card) 50'; Manias (yellow card) 53' (goal) 56'; Dioudis (yellow card) 90+4'	Attendance: 1,999; Referee: Anastasios Sidiropoulos

6 January 2014 18	Aris Thessaloniki	0–2	Apollon Smyrnis	Kleanthis Vikelidis Stadium
19:30	Karagounis (yellow card) 80'	Summary	Christos Mingas 2'; Chatzizisis (yellow card) 20'; Athanasios Panteliadis (yellow card) 28'; Petropoulos 59'; Alvarez (yellow card) 61'; Barkoglou (yellow card) 90+4'	Attendance: 6,919; Referee: Alexander Aretopoulos

13 January 2014 19	AEL Kalloni	3–1	Aris Thessaloniki	Olympic Stadium
19:30	Zakuani 34'; Manousos 49'; Marcelo Goianira (yellow card) 86'; Leozinho 87'	Summary	Iraklis (yellow card) 5'; Manias 14'; Tatos (yellow card) 35'; Rubén Pulido (yellow card) 85'	Attendance: 413; Referee: Ioannis Kabaxis

19 January 2014 20	Aris Thessaloniki	0–0	Atromitos	Kleanthis Vikelidis Stadium
15:00	Iraklis (yellow card) 51'; Sounas (yellow card) 65'; Tsoumanis (yellow card) 85'	Summary	Karamanos (yellow card) 30'; Giannoulis (yellow card) 55'; Tavlaridis (yellow card) 58'; Nastos (yellow card) 90+1'; Ballas (yellow card) 90+2'	Attendance: 6,398; Referee: Michael Koukoulakis

26 January 2014 21	Levadiakos	4–3	Aris Thessaloniki	Levadia Municipal Stadium
15:00	Rogério (yellow card) 32'; Kotsios 64', 86'; Kapo (yellow card) 67'; Pedro Sass (yellow card) 79'; Intzidis 84'; Varela 90+5'	Summary	Bougaidis (yellow card) 13' (yellow-red card); David Aganzo (yellow card) 24'; Bakasetas 30', 48'; Giannitsis (yellow card) 51'; Sounas (yellow card) 69'; Vlachos (yellow card) 70'; Manias 82' (yellow card) 83'; Stefanos Gounaridis (yellow card) 90+3'	Attendance: 1,257; Referee: Konstantinos Ioannidis

1 February 2014 22	Aris Thessaloniki	1–1	Skoda Xanthi	Kleanthis Vikelidis Stadium
17:15	Vlachos (yellow card) 42'; Tsoumanis (yellow card) 55'; Bakasetas 68'	Summary	García (yellow card) 29'; Soltani (yellow card) 42'; Mantalos 52'; Josemi (yellow card) 65'	Attendance: 8,136; Referee: Anastasios Kakos

6 February 2014 23	Panetolikos	0–0	Aris Thessaloniki	Panetolikos Stadium
19:30	Júnior (yellow card) 90+5'	Summary	Vangjeli (yellow card) 26'; Giannitsis (yellow card) 62'; Kyrgias (yellow card) 90'; Sounas (yellow card) 90+2'	Attendance: 1,533; Referee: Athanasios Giachos

10 February 2014 24	Aris Thessaloniki	1–0	Panionios	Kleanthis Vikelidis Stadium
19:30	Tsiaras (yellow card) 54'; Aganzo 58'; Stefanos Gounaridis (yellow card) 67'; Economopoulos (yellow card) 85'	Summary		Attendance: 7,937; Referee: Ioannis Topouzis

16 February 2014 25	Aris Thessaloniki	0–0	Veria	Kleanthis Vikelidis Stadium
17:15	Tsiaras (yellow card) 65'; Aganzo (yellow card) 68'	Summary	Ostojić (yellow card) 58'; Siontis (yellow card) 90'	Attendance: 11,429; Referee: Christos Mitsios

23 February 2014 26	Platanias	2–1	Aris Thessaloniki	Perivolia Municipal Stadium
17:15	David Arenas Torres 45+1'; Faísca 77'	Summary	Aganzo (yellow card) 48'; Manias 68'; Vangjeli (yellow card) 72'; Dioudis (yellow card) 83'; Bougaidis (red card) 83'; Tatos (yellow card) 83'; Bakasetas (red card) 83'; Papadopoulos (yellow card) 88'	Attendance: 1,806; Referee: Stavros Mantalos

1 March 2014 27	Aris Thessaloniki	0–0	OFI	Kleanthis Vikelidis Stadium
19:30	Kousidis (yellow card) 77'; Vangjeli (yellow card) 90+1'	Summary	Zé Eduardo (yellow card) 63'; Stathis (yellow card) 68'; Zoro (yellow card) 73'; Konstantinos Banousis (yellow card) 90+2'	Attendance: 6,038; Referee: Dimitrios Styliaras

8 March 2014 28	Panathinaikos	4–1	Aris Thessaloniki	Leoforos Alexandras Stadium
19:30	Berg 26' (yellow card) 37' (goal) 56' 74'; Klonaridis 45'	Summary	Tsiaras (yellow card) 39'; Manias 40'; Vlachos (yellow card) 43'; Tatos (yellow card) 52'; Kygrias (yellow card) 70'	Attendance: 11,187; Referee: Dimitrios Thanos

16 March 2014 29	Aris Thessaloniki	1–1	PAOK	Kleanthis Vikelidis Stadium
19:30	Petros Kaminiotis (yellow card) 13'; Tatos 23' (yellow card) 24'; Economopoulos (yellow card) 45+8'; David Aganzo (yellow card) 45+8' (yellow-red card); Vangjeli (yellow card) 72'; Aggeloudis (yellow card) 81'	Summary	Economopoulos 45' (o.g.); Athanasiadis (yellow card) 45+8'; Kaçe (red card) 45+8'; Natcho (yellow card) 51'; Tzavellas (yellow card) 52'; Glykos (yellow card) 70'	Attendance: 10,154; Referee: Georgios Kominis

22 March 2014 30	Panthrakikos	2–1	Aris Thessaloniki	Komotini Municipal Stadium
17:15	Romeu (yellow card) 13'; Ladakis (yellow card) 38'; Sergio Molina Rivero 72'; Igor 90'	Summary	Tsiaras (yellow card) 15'; Kyrgias 36'; Manias (yellow card) 64'; Iraklis (yellow card) 69'	Attendance: 1,494; Referee: Ioannis Delfakis

26 March 2014 31	Aris Thessaloniki	0–2	Ergotelis	Kleanthis Vikelidis Stadium
17:15		Summary	Bouchalakis (yellow card) 6'; Sarris 28'; Diamantakos 30'; Tzankakis (yellow card) 32'; Stojković (red card) 87'	Attendance: 2,731; Referee: Dimitrios Thanos

30 March 2014 32	Olympiacos	1–0	Aris Thessaloniki	Karaiskakis Stadium
19:30	Papadopoulos (yellow card) 81'; Valdez 84'	Summary	Sounas (yellow card) 30'; Dioudis (yellow card) 62'; Iraklis (red card) 85'	Attendance: 12,194; Referee: Ioannis Delfakis

6 April 2014 33	Asteras Tripolis	2–2	Aris Thessaloniki	Theodoros Kolokotronis Stadium
19:00	Carrasco 21' (red card) 52'; N'Daw 73'	Summary	Vasilios Triantafyllakos 53' (pen.); Manias 68'; Tsiaras (yellow card) 78'	Attendance: 1,097; Referee: Aristomenis Koutsiaftis

13 April 2014 34	Aris Thessaloniki	0–0	PAS Giannina	Kleanthis Vikelidis Stadium
19:00	Vlachos (yellow card) 87'	Summary	Berios (yellow card) 35'	Attendance: 3,336; Referee: Apostolos Amparkiolis

=== Greek Football Cup ===
All the 18 teams of Super League entered in the Round of 32

==== Round of 32 ====
26 September 2013 First leg	Olympiacos Volou	1–0	Aris Thessaloniki	Volos
18:00	Giannis Katsikis 74'	Report	Charalampos Oikonomopoulos (yellow card) 12'; Rubén Pulido (yellow card) 29'; John Ibeh (yellow card) 53'	Stadium: Volos Municipal Stadium; Referee: Alexandros Aretopoulos

31 October 2013 Second leg	Aris Thessaloniki	0–0 (0–1 agg.)	Olympiacos Volou	Thessaloniki
20:30	Rok Elsner (yellow card) 37'; Dimitris Sounas (yellow card) 53'; Michalis Manias (yellow card) 82'; Charalampos Oikonomopoulos (red card) 90'	Report	Yannick Yenga (yellow card) 86'	Stadium: Kleanthis Vikelidis Stadium; Referee: Anastasios Sidiropoulos

== Player statistics ==
=== Appearances ===
As of match played 13 April 2014

#	Position	Nat.	Player	Super League		Greek Cup		Total	
#	Position	Nat.	Player	Apps	Starts	Apps	Starts	Apps	Starts
2	DF	(Greece)	Michalis Kyrgias	23	18	0	0	23	18
3	DF	(Greece)	Michalis Giannitsis	16	15	0	0	16	15
4	MF	(Greece)	Vasilios Karagounis	12	9	1	1	13	10
5	DF	(Spain)	Rubén Pulido	15	14	2	2	17	16
6	DF	(Greece)	Charalampos Oikonomopoulos	21	17	2	2	23	19
7	MF	(Greece)	Dimitris Sounas	18	6	2	2	20	8
8	MF	(Greece)	Vasilis Triantafyllakos	12	10	1	1	13	11
9	FW	(Spain)	David Aganzo	17	15	2	1	19	16
10	MF	(Greece)	Andreas Tatos	30	28	1	1	31	29
11	FW	(Greece)	Nikos Angeloudis	17	6	2	1	19	7
12	MF	(Greece)	Kostas Kotsaridis	4	0	0	0	4	0
13	GK	(Greece)	Sokratis Dioudis	32	32	1	1	33	33
14	DF	(Greece)	Nikos Golias	2	2	0	0	2	2
18	DF	(Greece)	Nikos Tsoumanis	23	23	1	1	24	24
19	MF	(Greece)	Giannis Papadopoulos	16	13	0	0	16	13
21	DF	(Greece)	Giorgos Margaritis	11	8	1	1	12	9
22	DF	(Greece)	Aristotelis Karasalidis	2	0	0	0	2	0
25	FW	(Greece)	Tasos Bakasetas	10	10	0	0	10	10
28	MF	(Greece)	Petros Kaminiotis	10	9	0	0	10	9
29	FW	(Greece)	Ilias Stavropoulos	17	9	1	1	18	10
30	MF	(Greece)	Erotokritos Damarlis	13	8	2	0	15	8
31	DF	(Albania)	Kristi Vangjeli	11	11	0	0	11	11
32	GK	(Greece)	Marios Gelis	0	0	0	0	0	0
33	FW	(Greece)	Michalis Manias	31	25	2	0	33	25
35	FW	(Greece)	Nikos Kousidis	4	1	0	0	4	1
36	DF	(Greece)	Nikos Psychogios	12	11	1	1	13	12
37	DF	(Greece)	Valentinos Vlachos	8	8	0	0	8	8
44	DF	(Greece)	Andreas Iraklis	20	15	1	1	21	16
47	DF	(Greece)	Mavroudis Bougaidis	9	9	0	0	9	9
77	FW	(Albania) / (Greece)	Andi Renja	3	0	0	0	3	0
80	MF	(Greece)	Antonis Tsiaras	9	8	0	0	9	8
93	FW	(Greece)	Alexandros Karagiannis	4	0	1	1	5	1
99	GK	(Greece)	Stefanos Gounaridis	1	1	0	0	1	1
Players who left the club during this season
	FW	(Bulgaria) / (Nigeria)	Chigozie Udoji	13	13	0	0	13	13
	FW	(Nigeria) / (Spain)	John Ibeh	8	6	1	1	9	7
	MF	(Slovenia) / (France)	Rok Elsner	13	13	2	2	15	15
	DF	(Greece)	Stelios Tsoukanis	3	0	0	0	3	0
	GK	(Australia) / (Greece)	Dean Bouzanis	1	1	1	1	2	2
Total				34		2		36	

=== Goals ===
As of match played 13 April 2014

Ranking	Position	Nat.	Player	Super League	Greek Cup	Total
1	FW	(Greece)	Michalis Manias	7	0	7
2	FW	(Bulgaria) / (Nigeria)	Chigozie Udoji	5	0	5
3	MF	(Greece)	Andreas Tatos	3	0	3
3	FW	(Spain)	David Aganzo	3	0	3
3	FW	(Greece)	Tasos Bakasetas	3	0	3
6	FW	(Greece)	Nikos Angeloudis	1	0	1
6	DF	(Greece)	Michalis Kyrgias	1	0	1
6	MF	(Greece)	Erotokritos Damarlis	1	0	1
6	DF	(Greece)	Nikos Tsoumanis	1	0	1
6	MF	(Greece)	Vasilis Triantafyllakos	1	0	1
Own Goals				0	0	0
Total				26	0	26

=== Assists ===
As of match played 13 April 2014

Ranking	Position	Nat.	Player	Super League	Greek Cup	Total
1	MF	(Greece)	Andreas Tatos	9	0	9
2	FW	(Bulgaria) / (Nigeria)	Chigozie Udoji	2	0	2
3	FW	(Greece)	Michalis Manias	1	0	1
3	FW	(Greece)	Nikos Angeloudis	1	0	1
3	MF	(Greece)	Petros Kaminiotis	1	0	1
3	DF	(Greece)	Mavroudis Bougaidis	1	0	1
3	FW	(Spain)	David Aganzo	1	0	1
Total				16	0	16

== Kit ==
Supplier: Under Armour
Sponsor(s): Kino

Home; Colours	Away; Colours	Third; Colours	Goalkeeper's Home Colours	Goalkeeper's Away Colours
