= 2013–14 Atromitos F.C. season =

Atromitos
2013–14 season
- Chairman: Georgios Spanos
- Manager: Georgios Paraschos
- Stadium: Peristeri Stadium (Capacity: 10,200)
- Super League Greece: 3rd
- Greek Cup: Quarter-finals
- Europa League: Play-off round
- Top goalscorer: League: Dimitrios Papadopoulos (14); All: Dimitrios Papadopoulos (16)
Home colours	Away colours	Third colours

The 2013–14 season of Atromitos is the 91st in the club's history and the second consecutive season that the club will be participating in the UEFA Europa League. It will also be the sixth consecutive season that the club will be competing in Super League Greece.

== Events ==
=== Squad changes ===
- 8 June: A termination of contract with Manolo occurs, since the player couldn't live up to the expectations of the club.
- 10 June: Papadopoulos signs a two-year contract with the club.
- 15 June: Fotis Georgiou signs a three-year contract with the club.
- 17 June: Chigozie Udoji leaves the club, since his contract doesn't get renewed, despite the fact that he was in the starting eleven a lot of games last season.
- 19 June: Socrates Fytanidis renews his contract with the club for four years.
- 26 June: Javier Umbides signs a two-year contract with the club.
- 27 June: Pitu Garcia renews his contract with the club for one more year.
- 30 June: Christos Arkoudas signs a one-year contract with the club.
- 1 July: The first training of the club for the new year took place, and every member of the club, not only the players, was sanctificated, with 1,000 fans present at the stadium.
- 3 July: Michalis Sifakis signs a one-year contract with the club, with an option of a one-year renewal.
- 7 July: Luigi Cennamo signs a one-year contract with the club, with a one-year renewal option.
- 8 August: Njazi Kuqi signs a mutual consent termination of his contract with the club.

=== Important Moments ===
- 29 August: Atromitos achieve their first win in European matches, as well as their first away win in Europe, beating AZ Alkmaar 0–2. Unfortunately, this win was insufficient to give them the ticket for the group stage, since Atromitos had lost the first leg at home 1–3, with Alkmaar proceeding on away goals.

== Club ==
=== Athletic staff ===
Position	Staff
Head coach	Georgios Paraschos
Coach assistant	Panayiotis Gungides
Goalkeeping coach	Slobodan Sujica
Fitness coach	Sotirios Kakaryias
Technical Director	Ioannis Aggelopoulos
General Director	Spyridon Sofianos
Scouter	Apostolos Apostolou
Medical Director	Nikolaos Piskopakis
Doctor	Petros Kapralos
Physiotherapist	Panayiotis Ambeliotis
Physiotherapist	Nikolaos Zafiropoulos
Caregiver	Nikolaos Katsikas
Exercise Physio	Georgios Ziogas
Bus driver	Angelos Verikakis

Last updated: 2 July 2013
Source: Atromitos F.C.

=== Other information ===
President & CEO	Georgios Spanos
Vice President	Evangelos Batayiannis
Vice CEO	Ekaterini Koxenoglou
Ground Manager	Panayiotis Michaletos
Press Director	Pavlos Katonis
Marketing Director	Spyridon Boulousis
Security Director	Georgios Petrou
Information Director	Roberto Panayos
Accountants Director	Vasilios Karakatsanis
Club Lawyer	Argirios Livas
Secretary Director	Christina Moschona
Tickets Director	Marios Panayos
Ground (capacity and dimensions)	Peristeri Stadium (10,200 / 102x65 metres)

Last updated: 2 July 2013
Source: Atromitos F.C.

== Players ==
=== Squad statistics ===
No.	Pos.	Name	Age	League			Cup			Europa League			Total			Discipline	
No.	Pos.	Name	Age	Apps	Goals	Start	Apps	Goals	Start	Apps	Goals	Start	Apps	Goals	Start	Yellow card	Red card
Goalkeepers
1	GK	(Italy) Luigi Cennamo	33	0	0	0	0	0	0	0	0	0	0	0	0	0	0
30	GK	(Greece) Michalis Sifakis	29	1	0	1	0	0	0	1	0	1	2	0	2	0	0
35	GK	(Greece) Vasilis Barkas	19	2	0	2	0	0	0	1	0	1	3	0	3	0	0
Defenders
2	DF	(Greece) Theodoros Papoutsoyiannopoulos	19	1	0	0	0	0	0	1	0	1	2	0	1	0	0
3	DF	(Ghana) Arango Jamal	20	0	0	0	0	0	0	0	0	0	0	0	0	0	0
4	DF	(Greece) Stathis Tavlaridis	33	2	0	2	0	0	0	1	0	1	3	0	3	2	0
6	DF	(Greece) Sokratis Fytanidis	29	3	0	3	0	0	0	2	0	2	5	0	5	1	0
13	DF	(Greece) Evangelos Nastos	33	1	0	2	0	0	0	1	0	1	2	0	3	0	0
18	DF	(Greece) Kostas Giannoulis	26	3	0	3	0	0	0	2	0	1	5	0	4	1	0
24	DF	(Greece) Nikolaos Lazaridis	34	3	0	3	0	0	0	2	0	2	5	0	5	1	0
35	DF	(Greece) Christos Gromitsaris	22	0	0	0	0	0	0	0	0	0	0	0	0	0	0
36	DF	(Greece) Christos Arkoudas	23	0	0	0	0	0	0	0	0	0	0	0	0	0	0
Midfielders
7	MF	(Brazil) Eduardo Brito	31	3	0	3	0	0	0	1	0	1	4	0	4	1	0
8	MF	(Greece) Fotis Georgiou	28	0	0	0	0	0	0	0	0	0	0	0	0	0	0
10	MF	(Greece) Thanasis Karagounis	22	1	0	2	0	0	0	2	1	2	3	1	4	0	0
14	MF	(Greece) Manolis Kallergis	23	0	0	0	0	0	0	0	0	0	0	0	0	0	0
16	MF	(Greece) Panayiotis Ballas	20	1	0	1	0	0	0	1	0	1	2	0	2	0	0
17	MF	(Argentina) Walter Iglesias	28	1	0	1	0	0	0	1	0	1	2	0	2	1	0
21	MF	(Greece) Elini Dimoutsos	25	2	0	3	0	0	0	1	0	1	3	0	4	2	0
23	MF	(Argentina) Javier Umbides	31	3	1	3	0	0	0	2	0	2	5	1	5	1	0
26	MF	(Argentina) Pitu García	29	3	0	3	0	0	0	2	0	2	5	0	5	2	0
Forwards
9	FW	(Italy) Stefano Napoleoni	32	3	1	2	0	0	0	2	2	2	5	3	4	1	0
11	FW	(Greece) Dimitrios Papadopoulos	27	3	2	2	0	0	0	2	0	1	5	2	3	0	0
20	FW	(Greece) Anastasios Karamanos	25	0	0	0	0	0	0	0	0	0	0	0	0	0	0
40	FW	(Portugal) Fábio Moreira Tavares	23	2	0	0	0	0	0	1	0	0	3	0	0	0	0

=== International players ===
Player Infos		Activity	
National team	Player	Active	Non-A.
Greece	Michalis Sifakis	✔	
Greece	Kostas Giannoulis	✔	
Greece	Sokratis Fytanidis	✔	
Greece	Efstathios Tavlaridis		✔
Greece U21	Thanasis Karagounis	✔	
Greece U20	Panagiotis Ballas	✔	
Greece	Elini Dimoutsos	✔	
Greece	Dimitrios Papadopoulos	✔	

=== Transfers ===
==== Summer ====
===== In =====
Date	Pos.	Name	From	Fee
10 June 2013	FW	(Greece) Dimitrios Papadopoulos	Panthrakikos	Free
15 June 2013	MF	(Greece) Fotis Georgiou	PAS Giannina	Free
26 June 2013	MF	(Argentina) Javier Umbides	(Turkey) Orduspor	Free
30 June 2013	DF	(Greece) Christos Arkoudas	AEK Athens	Free
3 July 2013	GK	(Greece) Michalis Sifakis	(Belgium) Charleroi	Free
7 July 2013	GK	(Italy) Luigi Cennamo	(Israel) Maccabi Netanya	Free

===== Out =====
Date	Pos.	Name	To	Fee
2 June 2013	FW	(Greece) Vangelis Mantzios	Levadiakos	Free
8 June 2013	GK	(Spain) Manolo	(Spain) Gimnàstic	Free
17 June 2013	MF	(Nigeria) Chigozie Udoji	Aris FC	Free
21 June 2013	DF	(Greece) Ioannis Skondras	PAOK	€300.000
1 July 2013	MF	(Brazil) Chumbinho	Olympiacos	Loan return
3 July 2013	GK	(Croatia) Velimir Radman	Expiration of contract	
3 July 2013	GK	(Greece) Fotis Karagiolidis	AEK Athens	Free
8 August 2013	FW	(Finland) Njazi Kuqi	Mutual consent	

===== Loaned out =====
Date	Pos.	Name	To
11 August 2013	FW	(Greece) Fotis Kaimakamoudis	Mandraikos
13 August 2013	DF	(Greece) Anastasios Kantoutsis	Kalamata

== Competitions ==
=== Overall ===
Competition	Started round	Current position / round	Final position / round	First match	Last match
Super League Greece	1	4th (Alpha Order)	—	17 August	
Greek Football Cup	Round of 32	Quarter-Finals	Quarter-Finals	26 September	12 February
Europa League	Play-off round	Play-off round	Play-off round	22 August	29 August

Last updated: 7 March 2014

=== Super League Greece ===
==== League table ====
Pos	Team	Pld	W	D	L	GF	GA	GD	Pts	Qualification or relegation
1	Olympiacos (C)	34	28	2	4	88	19	+69	86	Qualification for the Champions League group stage
2	PAOK	34	21	6	7	68	37	+31	69	Qualification for the Play-offs
3	Atromitos	34	19	9	6	54	25	+29	66 (Note: Head-to-head points: Atromitos 4, Panathinaikos 1.)	Qualification for the Play-offs
4	Panathinaikos	34	20	6	8	57	28	+29	66	Qualification for the Play-offs
5	Asteras Tripolis	34	16	10	8	46	35	+11	58	Qualification for the Play-offs

Source: Super League Greece
Rules for classification: 1) Points; 2) Head-to-head points; 3) Head-to-head goal difference; 4) Goals scored; 5) Goals against; 6) Play-offs (neutral ground).
(Note: Criteria 6 is only used if needed to decide champion, teams for relegation or teams for UEFA competitions).
If in final league table there are still tied teams after applying criteria 1 to 5, a decision match (or matches if they are more than two) are to be played but only in three cases: to determine the champion, to fill spots in the play-off or to determine the teams to be relegated. In any other case, the final standings of tied teams are determined with a public draw.
(C) Champions

==== Results summary ====
Overall								Home						Away					
Pld	W	D	L	GF	GA	GD	Pts	W	D	L	GF	GA	GD	W	D	L	GF	GA	GD
34	19	9	6	54	25	+29	66	12	5	0	33	6	+27	7	4	6	21	19	+2

Last updated: 7 March 2014.
Source: Superleague Greece

==== Results by round ====
Round	1	2	3	4	5	6	7	8	9	10	11	12	13	14	15	16	17	18	19	20	21	22	23	24	25	26	27	28	29	30	31	32	33	34
Ground	H	A	H	A	H	A	A	H	A	H	A	H	A	H	A	H	H	A	H	A	H	A	H	H	A	H	A	H	A	H	A	H	A	A
Result	D	L	W	L	W	W	D	W	W	D	L	W	D	W	W	D	W	W	D	D	W	W	W	W	L	W	W	W	D	W	L	D	L	W
Position	7	14	7	11	10	6	4	3	3	3	3	3	3	3	3	3	3	3	3	3	3	3	3	3	3	3	2	3	3	3	3	3	4	3

Source: Super League
A = Away; H = Home; W = Win; D = Draw; L = Loss

== Matches ==
=== Friendlies ===
22 July 2013 Friendly	(England) Wigan Athletic	2–1	(Greece) Atromitos	Leigh, Greater Manchester
21.30 UTC	Gómez 6' (pen.); Fortuné 34'	Report	Karamanos 76'	Stadium: Leigh Sports Village

26 July 2013 Friendly	(England) Sheffield United	2–2	(Greece) Atromitos	Sheffield
21.30 UTC	Porter 2'; Taylor 90'	Report	Napoleoni 10', 25'	Stadium: Bramall Lane; Attendance: 3,331

29 July 2013 Friendly	(England) West Bromwich Albion	3–1	(Greece) Atromitos	Shrewsbury
21.30 UTC +2	Anelka 55'; Berahino 75'; Rosenberg 87'	Report	T. Karagounis 12'	Stadium: New Meadow; Attendance: High; Referee: Stuart Attwell

6 August 2013 Friendly	(Greece) Levadiakos	1–2	(Greece) Atromitos	Livadeia
19.00 UTC +2	Manolas 44'	Report	Umbides 53'; Karamanos 90+1'	Stadium: Levadia Municipal Stadium

10 August 2013 Friendly	(Greece) Atromitos	3–1	(Greece) Apollon Smyrnis	Peristeri
20.00 UTC +2	Karagounis 3'; Brito 27'; D. Papadopoulos 39'	Report	Petropoulos 11'	Stadium: Peristeri Stadium

4 September 2013 Friendly	(Greece) Ionikos Nikaias	0–1	(Greece) Atromitos	Nikaia, Attica
20.00 UTC +2		Report	Karagounis 52'	Stadium: Neapolis Public Stadium

=== Super League Greece ===
17 August 2013 1	Atromitos	2–2	Ergotelis	Peristeri
19.15 UTC +2	D. Papadopoulos (yellow card) 18' (goal) 87'; Umbides 25'; Dimoutsos (yellow card) 28'	Report	Badibanga 8' (yellow card) 63'; Anastasakos 36' (yellow card) 81'; Chanti (yellow card) 48'; Jovanović (yellow card) 58' (yellow-red card) 74'; Bouchalakis (yellow card) 59'	Stadium: Peristeri Stadium; Referee: Aristomenis Koutsiaftis

25 August 2013 2	Olympiacos Piraeus	2–1	Atromitos	Piraeus
21.30 UTC +2	Samaris (yellow card) 32'; Fuster 51'; Saviola 54'	Report	Lazaridis (yellow card) 30'; Brito (yellow card) 34'; Napoleoni 47'; Tavlaridis (yellow card) 48'; Dimoutsos (yellow card) 50'; Umbides (yellow card) 55'	Stadium: Georgios Karaiskakis Stadium; Referee: Elias Spathas

2 September 2013 3	Atromitos	2–0	Aris	Peristeri
19.15 UTC +2	Udoji 22' (o); Tavlaridis (yellow card) 35'; Napoleoni 38'	Report	Ikonomopoulos (yellow card) 30'; Kyrgias (yellow card) 33'; Tsoumanis (yellow card) 49'; Tatos (yellow card) 67'	Stadium: Peristeri Stadium; Referee: Konstantinos Ioannidis

17 September 2013 4	PAS Giannina	1–0	Atromitos	Ioannina
19:30 (UTC+2)	Tsoukalas 67'			Stadium: Zosimades Stadium; Referee: Ioannis Kampaxis

21 September 2013 5	Atromitos	2–0	Apollon Smyrnis	Peristeri
18:15 (UTC+2)				Stadium: Peristeri Stadium; Referee: Praxiteles Zaxariades

28 September 2013 6	AEL Kalloni	0–1	Atromitos	Attica
16:00 (UTC+2)				Stadium: Olympic Stadium (Athens); Referee: Anastasios Kakos

5 October 2013 7	Asteras Tripoli	2–2	Atromitos	Tripoli
16:00 (UTC+2)				Stadium: Theodoros Kolokotronis Stadium; Referee: Georgios Kominis

19 October 2013 8	Atromitos	3–0	Levadiakos	Peristeri
16:00 (UTC+2)				Stadium: Peristeri Stadium; Referee: Georgios Kyzas

26 October 2013 9	Skoda Xanthi	0–2	Atromitos	Xanthi
15:00 (UTC+2)				Stadium: Skoda Xanthi Arena; Referee: Praxiteles Zaxariades

4 November 2013 10	Atromitos	1–1	Panetolikos	Peristeri
19:30 (UTC+2)				Stadium: Peristeri Stadium; Referee: Christos Mitsios

10 November 2013 11	Panionios	2–1	Atromitos	Nea Smyrni
15:00 (UTC+2)				Stadium: Nea Smyrni Stadium; Referee: Georgios Daskalopoulos

23 November 2013 12	Atromitos	1–0	Veria	Peristeri
17:15 (UTC+2)				Stadium: Peristeri Stadium; Referee: Markos Lampropoulos

30 November 2013 13	Platanias	1–1	Atromitos	Chania
17:15 (UTC+2)				Stadium: Perivolia Municipal Stadium; Referee: Dimitris Styliaras

8 December 2013 14	Atromitos	3–0	OFI	Peristeri
17:15 (UTC+2)				Stadium: Peristeri Stadium; Referee: Ioannes Topouzis

14 December 2013 15	Panathinaikos	1–2	Atromitos	Athens
19:30 (UTC+2)				Stadium: Leoforos Alexandras Stadium; Referee: Anastasios Papapetrou

18 December 2013 16	Atromitos	1–1	PAOK	Peristeri
17:15 (UTC+2)				Stadium: Peristeri Stadium; Referee: Anastasios Kakos

21 December 2013 17	Atromitos	3–1	Panthrakikos	Peristeri
17:15 (UTC+2)				Stadium: Peristeri Stadium; Referee: Anastasios Giaxos

TBA 18	Ergotelis	v	Atromitos	Heraklion
TBA				Stadium: Pankritio Stadium; Referee: TBA

TBA 19	Atromitos	v	Olympiacos	Peristeri
TBA				Stadium: Peristeri Stadium; Referee: TBA

TBA 20	Aris	v	Atromitos	Thessaloniki
TBA				Stadium: Kleanthis Vikelidis Stadium; Referee: TBA

TBA 21	Atromitos	v	PAS Giannina	Peristeri
TBA				Stadium: Peristeri Stadium; Referee: TBA

TBA 22	Apollon Smyrnis	v	Atromitos	Rizoupoli
TBA				Stadium: Georgios Kamaras Stadium; Referee: TBA

TBA 23	Atromitos	v	AEL Kalloni	Peristeri
TBA				Stadium: Peristeri Stadium; Referee: TBA

TBA 24	Atromitos	v	Asteras Tripoli	Peristeri
TBA				Stadium: Peristeri Stadium; Referee: TBA

TBA 25	Levadiakos	v	Atromitos	Levadia
TBA				Stadium: Levadia Municipal Stadium; Referee: TBA

TBA 26	Atromitos	v	Skoda Xanthi	Peristeri
TBA				Stadium: Peristeri Stadium; Referee: TBA

TBA 27	Panetolikos	v	Atromitos	Agrinio
TBA				Stadium: Panetolikos Stadium; Referee: TBA

TBA 28	Atromitos	v	Panionios	Peristeri
TBA				Stadium: Peristeri Stadium; Referee: TBA

TBA 29	Veria	v	Atromitos	TBD
TBA				Stadium: TBD; Referee: TBA

TBA 30	Atromitos	v	Platanias	Peristeri
TBA				Stadium: Peristeri Stadium; Referee: TBA

TBA 31	OFI	v	Atromitos	Herakleion
TBA				Stadium: Theodoros Vardinogiannis Stadium; Referee: TBA

TBA 32	Atromitos	v	Panathinaikos	Peristeri
TBA				Stadium: Peristeri Stadium; Referee: TBA

TBA 33	PAOK	v	Atromitos	Thessaloniki
TBA				Stadium: Toumba Stadium; Referee: TBA

TBA 34	Panthrakikos	v	Atromitos	Komotini
TBA				Stadium: Komotini Municipal Stadium; Referee: TBA

=== Cup ===
25 September 2013 1/16 Final 1st leg	Fostiras	0–1	Atromitos	TBD
TBA	Kampasis (yellow card) 90'		Iglesias (yellow card) 33'; Papoutsogiannopoulos (yellow card) 75'; Karamanos 76'	Stadium: TBD; Referee: TBA

30 or 31 October 2013 1/16 Final 2nd leg	Atromitos	7–0	Fostiras	Peristeri
TBA	Georgiou 6'; Kaaramanos 16' 30'; Iglesias 41'; T. Karagounis 63'; Tavlaridis 70'		Kampasis 34' (o.g.)	Stadium: Peristeri Stadium; Referee: TBA

=== Europa League ===
22 August 2013 Play-off round 1st leg	(Greece) Atromitos	1–3	(Netherlands) AZ	Peristeri
19.30 UTC +2	Fytanidis (yellow card) 46'; Giannoulis (yellow card) 65'; D. Papadopoulos 76' (pen.)	Report	Viergever (yellow card) 7'; Guðmunsson 51', 90+3'; Jóhnannsson 73'; Alvarado (yellow card) 76'; Overtoom (yellow card) 89'	Stadium: Peristeri Stadium; Attendance: 5,000; Referee: (Spain) David Fernández Borbalán

29 August 2013 and 30 August 2013 Play-off round 2nd leg	(Netherlands) AZ	0–2	(Greece) Atromitos	Alkmaar
19.00 UTC +1 (Until 56:29) and 11.00 UTC +1 (From 56:30), because of a fire caused from the restaurant of AZ.	Henriksen (red card) 2'; Alvarado (yellow card) 19'; Gouweleew (yellow card) 55'	Report	Dimoutsos (yellow card) 22'; D. Papadopoulos 53'; Karagounis 75'; Iglesias (yellow card) 76'; Pitu Garcia (yellow card) 84'	Stadium: AFAS Stadion; Referee: (France) Antony Gautier
