= Karagounis (surname) =

Karagounis is a surname. Notable people with the surname include:

- Giorgos Karagounis (born 1977), Greek footballer
- Helen Karagounis, British athlete
- Vasilios Karagounis (born in 1994), Greek footballer
- Thanasis Karagounis (born 1991), Greek footballer
