= Ikonomopoulos =

Ikonomopoulos (Greek: Οικονομόπουλος) is a Greek surname. Notable people with the surname include:

- Antonis Ikonomopoulos (born 1998), Greek footballer
- Charalampos Ikonomopoulos (born 1991), Greek footballer
- Spyros Ikonomopoulos (born 1959), Greek footballer
- Takis Ikonomopoulos (1943–2025), Greek footballer

== See also ==
- Oikonomopoulos
