= Giannis Andreou =

Greek footballer

Personal information
- Full name: Ioannis Andreou
- Date of birth: 8 October 1997 (age 29)
- Place of birth: Larissa, Greece
- Height: 1.92 m (6 ft 4 in)
- Position: Centre-back

Team information
- Current team: Ethnikos Asteras

Youth career
- 2015–2017: Panathinaikos

Senior career*
Years	Team	Apps	(Gls)
2017–2018	Apollon Larissa	11	(0)
2018–2019	P.A.O. Koufalia	15	(1)
2019	Irodotos	15	(0)
2019–2020	Makedonikos	22	(0)
2020–2021	Episkopi	18	(1)
2021	Anagennisi Karditsa	0	(0)
2022	Egaleo	7	(0)
2022–2023	Ilioupoli	25	(1)
2023–2024	Tilikratis Leukadas	13	(0)
2024–2025	Aris Petroupolis	28	(0)
2025–	Ethnikos Asteras	0	(0)
- * Club domestic league appearances and goals as of 11 July 2025

Giannis Andreou (Greek: Γιάννης Ανδρέου; born 8 October 1997) is a Greek professional footballer who plays as a centre-back for Gamma Ethniki club Aris Petroupolis.
