= Sokratis Fytanidis =

Greek footballer (born 1984)

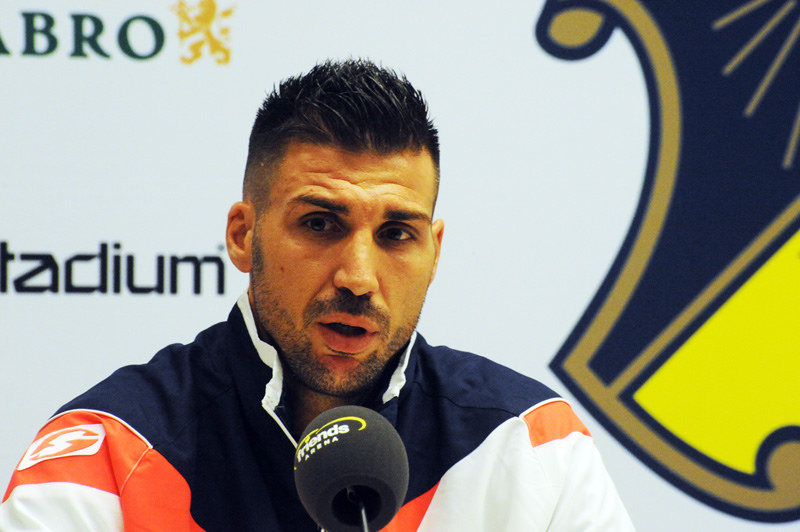

Personal information
- Date of birth: 25 May 1984 (age 42)
- Place of birth: Koufalia, Greece
- Height: 1.85 m (6 ft 1 in)
- Position: Centre-back

Youth career
- PAO Koufalia

Senior career*
Years	Team	Apps	(Gls)
2002–2007	Apollon Kalamarias	121	(2)
2007–2011	Asteras Tripolis	81	(1)
2011–2017	Atromitos	177	(9)
2018	Gaz Metan Mediaș	9	(0)
2019	Enosis Neon Paralimni	12	(2)
2019–2020	Levadiakos	5	(0)
2020–2021	Iraklis	6	(0)

International career
2004–2005	Greece U21	13	(1)

Managerial career
- 2020: Enosis Neon Paralimni (sporting director)
- 2025–: Polykastro
- * Club domestic league appearances and goals

Sokratis Fytanidis (Greek: Σωκράτης Φυτανίδης; born 25 May 1984) is a retired Greek professional footballer. Fytanidis was a right-back who could play with ease as a center-back or as a defensive midfielder if the need occurred. He had great work rate, discipline and leadership qualities. His playing style was discriminant about the right timing of his jumps and he seldom lost a header. More defending qualities include coordination of the defensive line, goal line saves and locking his personal opponent out of the game.

== Club career ==
Fytanidis joined Asteras from Apollon Kalamarias in January 2008. and in 2011 arrived at Atromitos on a free-transfer. In the 2010/11 season, he had 24 league and 2 cup appearances and he was the captain of Asteras Tripolis.

On 27 August 2011,he make his debut with Atromitos on a 1–1 away draw against OFI and scored his first goal on 12 February 2012 in a 3–1 home win against Kerkyra. In the summer of 2013, Atromitos announced the re-signing of Fytanidis to a new 4-year contract just days after transfer speculation had the Greek midfielder on his way to Super League rivals PAOK. Fytanidis' new deal means he will remain at the club until the end of the 2016–17 Super League Greece season. The club announced the re-signing of the 29-year-old via the club's official website, "Atromitos are pleased to announce the renewal of its partnership with Sokratis Fytanidis", the statement read. The club's statement referred to Fytanidis as the "rock" of the club's defense, a label Fytanidis has earned thanks to his solid partnership alongside Nikolaos Lazaridis and Efstathios Tavlaridis in the Atromitos back-line. Fytanidis with his defensive awareness immediately helped the club to reach back-to-back Greek Cup finals in 2011 and 2012. Fytanidis' success with Atromitos also earned him a call-up to the national team.

According to transfer reports, Fytanidis was rumored to be joining Panathinaikos on a free transfer until it was revealed that new PAOK owner Ivan Savvidis was keen to bring Fytanidis to Thessaloniki. Fytanidis commented on his decision to remain an Atromitos player and his hopes for future success with the club. "I am happy to continue my career Atromitos. I could not do so at another club after the support from the [club president] Mr. George Spanos and the high standard that has been set by the club and the fans", Fytanidis stated. "Besides, through my discussions with Mr. Yiannis Angelopoulos, I know that the team has no ceiling for its aspirations. So I will work very hard to make sure we achieve the goals we have set".

On 25 June 2015, he renewed his contract with the club for three more years, till the summer of 2018, for an undisclosed fee. On 19 May 2017, Konyaspor are monitoring the case of experienced central defender and captain of Atromitos, ahead of 2017–18 season. On 6 July 2017, Fytanidis filed an appeal against Atromitos for payment delay. The Greek international in his appeal, he claims for an amount that covers his compensation during his career in the club. On 29 December 2017, the committee of the Hellenic Football Federation's financial disputes had given the football player the amount of €237,565.

On 23 February 2018, after his trial with Atromitos Fytanidis signed a six months contract with Romanian Liga I Betano club Gaz Metan for an undisclosed fee.

On 10 January 2019, he signed a contract with Enosis Neon Paralimni until the summer of 2020. On 30 August 2019, he signed a two years contract with Super League 2 club Levadiakos for an undisclosed fee. At the end of the season he announced his retirement.

=== Later career ===
On 10 June 2020, Enosis Neon Paralimni confirmed that they had hired Fytanidis as sporting director. However, only 20 days later, it was reported that he had left the position again.

On 2 October 2020, it was announced that the experienced defender is coming out of retirement to sign for Iraklis in order to help the team return to the professional categories.

== International career ==
He was 59 times capped with the U-21, U-19, and U-17 Greece national teams. On 1 February 2013, Fernando Santos the coach of Greece has called the Peristeri defender for the first time in national team for a friendly match against Switzerland.

== Honours ==
=== Club ===
Atromitos

- Greek Cup: runner-up 2011–12
