= Mavroudis Bougaidis =

Greek footballer (born 1993)

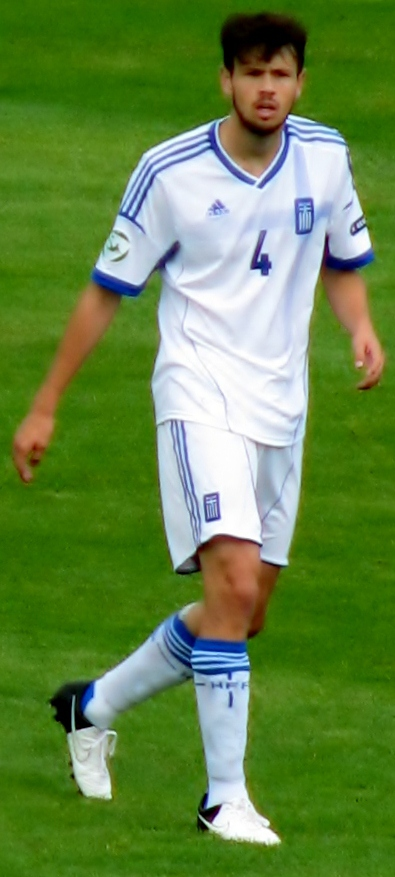
- Bougaidis playing for Greece U19

Personal information
- Full name: Mavroudis Bougaidis
- Date of birth: 1 June 1993 (age 33)
- Place of birth: Koufalia, Greece
- Height: 1.90 m (6 ft 3 in)
- Position: Centre-back

Team information
- Current team: Agios Dimitrios

Youth career
- 2008–2009: Aris

Senior career*
Years	Team	Apps	(Gls)
2011–2013	AEK Athens	27	(0)
2013–2015	Granada B	15	(0)
2014	→ Aris (loan)	9	(0)
2014–2015	→ Lechia Gdańsk (loan)	12	(0)
2014–2015	→ Lechia Gdańsk II (loan)	6	(1)
2015–2017	Panthrakikos	23	(0)
2017	Kissamikos	14	(0)
2017	GAIS	10	(1)
2018–2019	Podbeskidzie	28	(1)
2019–2020	PAO Koufalia	7	(0)
2021–2025	Chrobry Głogów	114	(4)
2025–2026	Ilioupoli	19	(0)
2026–	Agios Dimitrios		

International career
2009–2010	Greece U17	7	(0)
2010–2012	Greece U19	14	(3)
2013	Greece U20	4	(0)
2012–2014	Greece U21	8	(0)
Medal record
Men's football
Representing Greece
UEFA European Under-19 Championship
Runner-up	2012 Estonia
- * Club domestic league appearances and goals as of 25 April 2026

Mavroudis Bougaidis (Greek: Μαυρουδής Μπουγαΐδης, born 1 June 1993) is a Greek professional footballer who plays as a centre-back for Athens FCA First Division club Agios Dimitrios.

== Club career ==
=== Early years ===
Aris academies found a talented defender and the club signed with him a contract for two years. Many clubs in Greece were interested in signing Bougaidis, as he was very good with the youth team of Aris and with the Greece U19 team, too. Four clubs from Europe approached him, but he chose to play for AEK Athens.

=== AEK Athens ===
On 16 May 2011, Mavroudis Bougaidis signed a three-year deal with Greek giants AEK Athens. He made his UEFA Europa League debut against Anderlecht as a substitution. He also played against Sturm Graz in the Europa League and impressed in Greek Super League matches at the end of 2011–12 season. In July 2012 AEK Athens rejected a €1.1 million bid for Bougaidis from Everton F.C. For the 2012–13 season Bougaidis achieved 14 appierances for the Super League Greece in a disappointing season for AEK Athens as it failed to stay in the first division of the league. He also scored an own goal against Panthrakikos at the 87th minute of the penultimate fixture. The game interrupted after the invasion of AEK' fans.

=== Granada ===
On 30 July 2013, Bougaidis signed a three-year deal with La Liga team Granada CF. Initially expected to join Hércules CF on loan, the deal later collapsed and he was assigned to B-team in Segunda División B. On 1 January 2014, Bougaidis was loaned to Aris Thessaloniki, his first professional team until the end of the 2013–14 season. On 4 July 2014, he was loaned to Lechia Gdańsk for the 2014–15 season, playing in Polish Ekstraklasa. He made his debut on 14 September 2014 against GKS Bełchatów (1-1).

=== Return to Greece ===
In summer 2015, after playing in Spain and Poland, Bougaidis returned to Greece to play for Panthrakikos. In January 2017, he signed a six-month contract with Kissamikos.

=== GAIS ===
On 5 August 2017, Bougaidis signed a one-year and a half contract with Swedish Superettan club GAIS, for an undisclosed fee. On 4 November, he scored his first goal with the club came as a substitute in a 3–0 home win game against Varberg. He left the club again at the end of the 2017 season.

=== Podbeskidzie Bielsko-Biała ===
Bougaidis signed for Polish club Podbeskidzie Bielsko-Biała on 23 January 2018. On 17 March, he scored his first goal with the club came in a 2–0 away win game against Ruch Chorzów.

=== PAO Koufalia ===
Ahead of the 2019–20 season, Bougaidis returned to Greece and joined PAO Koufalia on 20 September 2019.

=== Chrobry Głogów ===
On 26 January 2021, Bougaidis signed a year-and-a-half contract with Polish club Chrobry Głogów.

=== Ilioupolis ===
On 1 August 2025, Bougaidis moved to Super League Greece 2 side Ilioupolis.

== International career ==
Bougaidis has 20 appearances for Greece U-19 National team with 4 goals. On 15 July 2012, he participated in the Final of Euro Under 19 against Spain in a 1–0 defeat. He played the whole match as a central defender next to his good friend Dimitrios Kourbelis. In June 2013 Bougaidis participated on the World Cup U20 with Greece getting eliminated in the round of 16.

== Career statistics ==
As of match played 19 May 2025

Appearances and goals by club season, and competition
Club	Season	League			National cup (Note: Includes Greek Cup, Svenska Cupen, Polish Cup)		Continental		Total	
Club	Season	Division	Apps	Goals	Apps	Goals	Apps	Goals	Apps	Goals
AEK Athens	2011–12	Super League Greece	9	0	1	0	2 (Note: Appearances in UEFA Europa League)	0	12	0
AEK Athens	2012–13	Super League Greece	18	0	2	0	—		20	0
AEK Athens	Total		27	0	3	0	2	0	32	0
Granada B	2013–14	Segunda División B	15	0	—		—		15	0
Aris (loan)	2013–14	Super League Greece	9	0	0	0	—		9	0
Lechia Gdańsk (loan)	2014–15	Ekstraklasa	12	0	0	0	—		12	0
Lechia Gdańsk II (loan)	2014–15	III liga	6	1	—		—		6	1
Panthrakikos	2015–16	Super League Greece	14	0	3	0	—		17	0
Panthrakikos	2016–17	Football League	9	0	1	0	—		10	0
Panthrakikos	Total		23	0	4	0	0	0	27	0
Kissamikos	2016–17	Football League	14	0	0	0	—		14	0
GAIS	2017	Superettan	10	1	1	0	—		11	1
Podbeskidzie	2017–18	I liga	14	1	0	0	—		14	1
Podbeskidzie	2018–19	I liga	14	0	0	0	—		14	0
Podbeskidzie	Total		28	1	0	0	0	0	28	1
PAO Koufalia	2019–20	MFCA	7	0	—		—		7	0
Chrobry Głogów	2020–21	I liga	15	2	1	0	—		16	2
Chrobry Głogów	2021–22	I liga	29	1	0	0	—		30	1
Chrobry Głogów	2022–23	I liga	23	0	1	0	—		23	0
Chrobry Głogów	2023–24	I liga	26	1	1	0	—		27	1
Chrobry Głogów	2024–25	I liga	21	0	1	0	—		22	0
Chrobry Głogów	Total		114	4	4	0	0	0	118	4
Career total			265	7	12	0	2	0	279	7
