= Oikonomopoulos =

(Greek: Οικονομόπουλος) is a Greek surname. It is often also rendered as Ikonomopoulos or Economopoulos. The feminine form is Oikonomopoulou (Οικονομοπούλου). It may refer to:

- Aikaterini Oikonomopoulou (born 1978), Greek water polo player
- Charalambos Economopoulos (born 1991), Greek football player
- Costaki Economopoulos (born 1969), Greek-American stand-up comedian
- Eleni Oikonomopoulou (1912–1999), Greek artist
- Nikos Oikonomopoulos (born 1984), Greek singer
- Nikos Economopoulos (born 1953), Greek photographer

== See also ==
- Ikonomopoulos
