= Antonis Tsiaras =

Greek footballer

Personal information
- Full name: Antonios Tsiaras
- Date of birth: 7 September 1993 (age 33)
- Place of birth: Larissa, Greece
- Height: 1.73 m (5 ft 8 in)
- Position: Defensive midfielder

Team information
- Current team: Ayia Napa
- Number: 18

Youth career
- 2008–2012: AEL

Senior career*
Years	Team	Apps	(Gls)
2012–2013	AEL	35	(2)
2013–2014	Skoda Xanthi	0	(0)
2014	Aris	9	(0)
2014–2015	Pierikos	24	(1)
2015–2016	Olympiacos Volos	13	(2)
2016	Panthrakikos	9	(0)
2016–2017	Apollon Smyrnis	17	(0)
2017–2019	Trikala	48	(0)
2019–2020	Olympiacos Volos	19	(3)
2020–2022	Ayia Napa	25	(4)
2022–2023	Panachaiki	17	(0)
2023–	Ayia Napa	77	(5)

International career^{‡}
2013	Greece U21	1	(0)
- * Club domestic league appearances and goals as of 3 May 2026 ‡ National team caps and goals as of 30 May 2013

Antonis Tsiaras (Greek: Αντώνης Τσιάρας; born 7 September 1993) is a Greek professional footballer who plays as a defensive midfielder for Cypriot Second Division club Ayia Napa.

== Career ==
Tsiaras started his career from the AEL's youth academies in 2008, in the age of 14. In January 2012 he caught the attention of Bozidar Bandovic, who by that time was the team's head coach and was impressed by the young player's talent and decided to promote him. Eventually on 22 January 2012 Tsiaras signed a 5-year professional contract and moved to the first squad.

== Club statistics ==
As of 25 June 2019

Club	Season	League			Cup		Other		Total	
Club	Season	Division	Apps	Goals	Apps	Goals	Apps	Goals	Apps	Goals
AEL	2011–12	Football League	3	1	0	0	—		3	1
AEL	2012–13	Football League	32	1	1	0	—		33	1
AEL	Total		35	2	1	0	0	0	36	2
Aris	2013–14	Super League Greece	9	0	0	0	—		9	0
Pierikos	2014–15	Football League	24	1	1	0	—		25	1
Olympiacos Volos	2015–16	Football League	13	2	1	0	—		14	2
Panthrakikos	2015–16	Super League Greece	9	0	0	0	—		9	0
Apollon Smyrnis	2016–17	Football League	17	0	3	0	—		20	0
Trikala	2017–18	Football League	24	0	4	0	—		28	0
Trikala	2018–19	Football League	24	0	3	0	—		27	0
Trikala	Total		48	0	7	0	0	0	55	0
Career total			155	5	13	0	0	0	168	5
