= Andreas Iraklis =

Greek footballer

Personal information
- Date of birth: 16 May 1989 (age 37)
- Place of birth: Thessaloniki, Greece
- Height: 1.81 m (5 ft 11 1/2 in)
- Positions: Right back; defensive midfielder

Youth career
- 2005–2006: Ajax Tavros

Senior career*
Years	Team	Apps	(Gls)
2007–2008	Panionios	0	(0)
2008–2009	Koropi	13	(0)
2009–2012	Kallithea	67	(2)
2012–2014	Aris	25	(0)
2014–2015	Apollon Smyrnis	19	(0)
2015–2016	Chania	4	(0)
2016	Panargiakos	0	(0)
2016–2017	Chania	23	(0)
2017–2019	Aittitos Spata	24	(0)
2019–2020	Ilisiakos		
2020	Marko		
2021	AE Moschato		
2021–2022	Ajax Tavros	17	(0)
2022–2023	Acharnaikos		
2023–2024	P.A.O. Rouf		
- * Club domestic league appearances and goals as of 23 August 2025

Andreas Iraklis (Greek: Ανδρέας Ηρακλής; born 16 May 1989) is a Greek footballer.

== Club career ==
Iraklis started his career in Ajax Tavros during 2005 before being transferred to Panionios in 2007, he was loaned to Koropi before signing for Kallithea where he spent three years earning 67 caps. In 2012, he was transferred to Aris Thessaloniki.
