= Ilias Stavropoulos =

Greek footballer

Personal information
- Date of birth: 6 May 1995 (age 31)
- Place of birth: Thessaloniki, Greece
- Height: 1.74 m (5 ft 8 1/2 in)
- Position: Right winger

Youth career
- 2011–2012: Aris

Senior career*
Years	Team	Apps	(Gls)
2013–2015	Aris	17	(0)
2015–2016	Episkopi	0	(0)
2016	Kampaniakos	0	(0)
2017–2018	Omonia Aradippou	26	(1)
2018–2019	Triglia		
2019–2020	Olympiakos Kymina		

International career
2013	Greece U-19	1	(0)
- * Club domestic league appearances and goals

Ilias Stavropoulos (Greek: Ηλίας Σταυρόπουλος; born on 6 April 1995) is a Greek professional footballer who plays as a winger.

== Club career ==
=== Aris ===
He started his career in youth teams of Aris. During the 2013–2014 season, he was promoted him to the first team, by manager Zoran Milinković. As of October 2013 he is member of Greece's U19 national team after he was chosen from Kostas Tsanas, head of the U19 team.

=== Olympiakos Kymina ===
Ahead of the 2019–20 season, Stavropoulos joined Olympiakos Kymina.
