= Erotokritos Damarlis =

Greek footballer

Personal information
- Date of birth: 13 May 1992 (age 34)
- Place of birth: Thessaloniki, Greece
- Height: 1.85 m (6 ft 1 in)
- Position: Defensive midfielder

Team information
- Current team: Α.O. Sarti 1982

Youth career
- 2009–2011: Aris

Senior career*
Years	Team	Apps	(Gls)
2012–2014	Aris	24	(1)
2014–2015	Agrotikos Asteras	1	(0)
2014–2015	Episkopi F.C.	1	(0)
2015–2016	A.E. Ermionida F.C.	12	(1)
2015–2016	Apollon Kalamarias	10	(1)
2016–	A.O. Sarti 1982		

International career
2012	Greece U21	2	(0)
- * Club domestic league appearances and goals

Erotokritos Damarlis (Greek: Ερωτόκριτος Νταμαρλής; born on 13 May 1992) is a Greek midfielder currently playing for Α.O. Sarti 1982.

== Club career ==
=== Aris ===
He started his career in youth teams of Aris. In 2012, new head coach Makis Katsavakis promoted him to the first team, and he made his professional debut on 26 August 2012, in a Supeleague game against Panionios.
