= Stefano Napoleoni =

Italian footballer

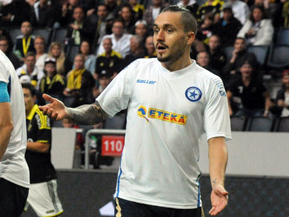

Personal information
- Full name: Stefano Napoleoni
- Date of birth: 26 June 1986 (age 40)
- Place of birth: Rome, Italy
- Height: 1.78 m (5 ft 10 in)
- Position: Forward

Team information
- Current team: Real Monterotondo

Youth career
- 2005–2006: U.S. Tor di Quinto

Senior career*
Years	Team	Apps	(Gls)
2006–2009	Widzew Łódź	61	(11)
2009–2013	Levadiakos	94	(26)
2013–2016	Atromitos	81	(24)
2016–2019	Başakşehir	71	(11)
2019–2021	Göztepe	44	(7)
2021–2022	Ümraniyespor	13	(3)
2022–2023	Roma City	9	(0)
2023–	Real Monterotondo	29	(8)
- * Club domestic league appearances and goals as of 31 May 2024

Stefano Napoleoni (born 26 June 1986) is an Italian professional footballer who plays as a forward for Serie D club Real Monterotondo.

== Club career ==
=== Widzew Łódź ===
In 2006, Napoleoni was spotted by Zbigniew Boniek during a Promozione amateur game in Rome, where he scored three goals; he was signed by Widzew Łódź shortly afterwards, thus becoming the first Italian footballer to ever play in the Polish Ekstraklasa league. Later that season, he was also joined by fellow Italian player Joseph Dayo Oshadogan. He moved to Levadiakos after Widzew Łódź were relegated at the end of 2008.

=== Levadiakos ===
In January 2009, he signed for Greek club Levadiakos after APOEL FC had withdrawn its interest in signing him player. Throughout the years, he became an idol for Levadiakos' fans. In July 2012, six months before his contract with Levadiakos expired, Napoleoni was attracting interest from West Bromwich Albion. He left Levadiakos in December 2012 at the end of his contract. Overall, Napoleoni played 98 games, scored 28 goals and made 11 assists while at the club.

=== Atromitos F.C. ===
In January 2013 he signed for Greek club Atromitos F.C.

In April 2015, as his contract was soon to expire, he was gathering interest from AEK, Sassuolo and PAOK.

On 3 May 2015, Atromitos played against Panionios, which would decide whether Atromitos would enter the playoffs. Napoleoni scored his second career hat-trick and lead his team to a 3-1 victory, promoting his club to the Greek playoffs. Being one of the most stable and most valuable players of Atromitos F.C. during the last seasons, he cashed his offer with a new four-year contract (2 + 2 years), which would have tied him with the club until mid-2019.

=== İstanbul Başakşehir ===
On 31 January 2016, Napoleoni signed a one-and-a-half-year contract with Super Lig side İstanbul Başakşehir for a fee of €400,000. He spoke to club's official website about his decision to continue his career in Turkey with İstanbul Başakşehir, after three years at the club: "I need more than a thousand words to describe my feelings right now, I am happy but also sad for leaving after three years, which I will never forget. I want to thank my teammates, all the managers I worked with, the president, Mr. Spanos, the Technical Manager, Mr. Angelopoulos and especially the fans who supported me during good and difficult times. I would have never made this career step without all of them; they helped me improve as a player and as a person, so I am sure that in the future I will wear Atromitos' shirt again".

=== Göztepe ===
On 2 September 2019, Napoleoni moved to another Super Lig club Göztepe for an undisclosed fee, on a one-year deal (with an option of another year).

=== Ümraniyespor ===
On 7 September 2021, Napoleoni signed for TFF First League side Ümraniyespor.

=== Later years in Italy ===
In November 2022, Napoleoni returned to his native Italy to join Serie D club Roma City. After making only nine appearances with Roma City in a lacklustre season ended with relegation, in August 2023 Napoleoni switched sides, joining Serie D club Real Monterotondo.

== Personal life ==
Napoleoni is a fan of AS Roma. In 2013, he said, "I dream of playing in Roma with the phenomenon Francesco Totti. I was on the field against PAOK, I scored two goals, and we won. In the locker room, my teammates told me the result of Roma vs Lazio and, for me, it was a total massacre. If Rudi Garcia called me, I could go to Rome on foot."

== Career statistics ==
As of match played 5 May 2024

Appearances and goals by club, season and competition
Club	Season	League			National cup		Continental		Other		Total	
Club	Season	Division	Apps	Goals	Apps	Goals	Apps	Goals	Apps	Goals	Apps	Goals
Widzew Łódź	2006–07	Ekstraklasa	17	4	0	0	—		—		17	4
Widzew Łódź	2007–08	Ekstraklasa	27	7	0	0	—		—		27	7
Widzew Łódź	2008–09	I liga	17	0	1	0	—		—		18	0
Widzew Łódź	Total		61	11	1	0	0	0	0	0	62	11
Levadiakos	2008–09	Super League Greece	8	3	0	0	—		—		8	3
Levadiakos	2009–10	Super League Greece	26	7	1	0	—		—		27	7
Levadiakos	2010–11	Football League Greece	32	8	1	0	—		3	0	36	8
Levadiakos	2011–12	Super League Greece	18	8	0	0	—		—		18	8
Levadiakos	2012–13	Super League Greece	10	0	0	0	—		—		10	0
Levadiakos	Total		94	26	2	0	0	0	3	0	99	26
Atromitos	2012–13	Super League Greece	10	1	0	0	—		6	4	16	5
Atromitos	2013–14	Super League Greece	24	7	3	0	2	0	5	3	34	10
Atromitos	2014–15	Super League Greece	30	13	1	0	2	0	6	0	39	13
Atromitos	2015–16	Super League Greece	17	3	5	4	4	1	—		26	8
Atromitos	Total		81	24	9	4	8	1	17	7	115	36
Başakşehir	2015–16	Süper Lig	11	2	1	0	—		—		12	2
Başakşehir	2016–17	Süper Lig	16	4	9	4	—		—		25	8
Başakşehir	2017–18	Süper Lig	18	2	2	1	9	1	—		29	4
Başakşehir	2018–19	Süper Lig	26	3	2	0	2	0	—		30	3
Başakşehir	Total		71	11	14	5	11	1	0	0	96	17
Göztepe	2019–20	Süper Lig	29	6	0	0	—		—		29	6
Göztepe	2020–21	Süper Lig	15	1	2	0	—		—		17	1
Göztepe	Total		44	7	2	0	—		—		46	7
Ümraniyespor	2021–22	TFF First League	13	3	1	1	—		—		14	4
ASD Roma City FC	2022–23	Serie D	9	0	—		—		0	0	9	0
Real Monterotondo	2023–24	Serie D	29	8	—		—		1	0	30	8
Career total			402	90	29	10	19	2	21	7	471	109

== Honours ==
Widzew Łódź

- I liga: 2008–09
