= Theodoros Papoutsogiannopoulos =

Greek footballer

Personal information
- Date of birth: 5 July 1994 (age 32)
- Place of birth: Athens, Greece
- Height: 1.80 m (5 ft 11 in)
- Position: Right back

Team information
- Current team: Egaleo
- Number: 13

Youth career
- Atromitos

Senior career*
| Years | Team | Apps | (Gls) |
| 2013–2015 | Atromitos | 1 | (0) |
| 2014 | → Niki Volos (loan) | 1 | (0) |
| 2015 | → AO Chania (loan) | 3 | (0) |
| 2015–2016 | Pierikos | 0 | (0) |
| 2016–2017 | Aiginiakos | 26 | (0) |
| 2017 | Slavia Sofia | 4 | (0) |
| 2017–2018 | Kalamata | 0 | (0) |
| 2018–2019 | Olympiacos Volos | 0 | (0) |
| 2019–2020 | Ionikos | 13 | (0) |
| 2020– | Egaleo | 0 | (0) |

International career
| 2011–2012 | Greece U17 | 1 | (0) |
| 2012 | Greece U18 | 3 | (0) |
| 2013–2014 | Greece U19 | 5 | (0) |
| 2015 | Greece U21 | 2 | (0) |
- * Club domestic league appearances and goals as of 31 August 2020

Theodoros Papoutsogiannopoulos (Greek: Θεόδωρος Παπουτσογιαννόπουλος, born 5 July 1994) is a Greek professional footballer who plays as a right back for Super League 2 club Egaleo.

== Career ==
Papoutsogiannopoulos started playing professional football with Atromitos, after his promotion for the first team from the Youth system. He made his debut in Greek Super League for Atromitos against Olympiacos.

In June 2017, he joined Bulgarian First League club Slavia Sofia but his contract was terminated by mutual consent in September.

On 1 September 2017, Papoutsogiannopoulos joined Kalamata.

== Honours ==
Olympiacos Volos

- Gamma Ethniki: 2018–19
