= Nikos Kousidis =

Greek footballer (born 1993)

Personal information
- Full name: Nikolaos Kousidis
- Date of birth: 3 January 1993 (age 33)
- Place of birth: Heraklion, Greece
- Height: 1.76 m (5 ft 9 1/2 in)
- Position: Winger

Youth career
- Panathinaikos

Senior career*
Years	Team	Apps	(Gls)
2012–2014	Panathinaikos	5	(0)
2014	Aris	4	(0)
2014–2015	Irodotos		
2015–2016	OFI		
2016	→ Vyzas Megara (loan)		
2016–2017	Panthrakikos	8	(0)
2017	Karaiskakis		
2017	Jaro	3	(0)
2018	Karaiskakis	6	(0)

International career
2009–2010	Greece U17	4	(1)
2010–2012	Greece U19	13	(2)
- * Club domestic league appearances and goals as of 10 June 2018

Nikos Kousidis (Greek: Νίκος Κουσίδης; born 3 January 1993) is a Greek professional footballer who plays as a winger.

== Career ==
On 26 May 2012, Kousidis signed his first professional contract with Panathinaikos. On 6 January 2014, Kousidis signed a contract with Super League Greece club Aris.
