= Nikos Tsoumanis =

Greek footballer (1990–2021)

Nikolaos Tsoumanis
Personal information
- Full name: Nikolaos Tsoumanis
- Date of birth: 8 June 1990
- Place of birth: Greece (Note: Some sources say that he was born in Igoumenitsa, while others say that he was born in Ioannina.)
- Date of death: October 2021 (aged 31)
- Place of death: Kalamaria, Greece
- Height: 1.78 m (5 ft 10 in)
- Position: Left-back

Youth career
- –2009: Skoda Xanthi

Senior career*
Years	Team	Apps	(Gls)
2009–2010	Makedonikos	18	(0)
2010–2012	Skoda Xanthi	3	(1)
2012–2013	Kerkyra	20	(0)
2013–2014	Aris	23	(1)
2014–2015	Panthrakikos	22	(1)
2015	Veria	1	(0)
2015–2018	Aris	30	(0)
2018–2020	Apollon Pontus	30	(0)
2020–2021	PO Triglias	3	(0)
2021	Makedonikos	0	(0)
Total		150	(3)
- * Club domestic league appearances and goals

Nikolaos 'Nikos' Tsoumanis (Greek: Νικόλαος 'Νίκος' Τσουμάνης; 8 June 1990 – October 2021) was a Greek professional footballer who played as a left-back.

== Career ==
Tsoumanis left Panthrakikos as he did not renew his contract to join Veria on 9 July 2015. He later signed with major Greek club, Aris.

== Death ==
Tsoumanis was found dead in his car on the morning of 5 October 2021. The medical examiner believed the cause of death to be suffocation. Police initially suspected "foul play" as his hands were bound. However, following further examination, Tsoumanis's death was ruled to be an accident.
