= Vasilios Karagounis =

Greek footballer (born in 1994)

Personal information
- Date of birth: 18 January 1994 (age 32)
- Place of birth: Lamia, Greece
- Height: 1.76 m (5 ft 9 in)
- Position: Defensive midfielder

Team information
- Current team: FC Feronikeli 74
- Number: 32

Youth career
- 2007–2010: Atromitos
- 2010–2012: Udinese
- 2012–2013: Olympiacos

Senior career*
Years	Team	Apps	(Gls)
2010–2012	Udinese Primavera	35	(2)
2012–2016	Olympiacos	0	(0)
2013–2014	→ Aris (loan)	12	(0)
2014–2015	→ Reggina (loan)	20	(0)
2015–2016	→ AEL Limassol (loan)	5	(0)
2016–2017	Iraklis	14	(0)
2018–2020	Platanias	35	(7)
2020–2021	Ermis Aradippou	32	(0)
2021–2022	FC Torpedo Kutaisi	26	(0)
2022–2024	Kalamata	30	(0)
2024	Zhenis	11	(0)
2024–	FC Feronikeli 74	23	(1)

International career^{‡}
2009–2011	Greece U17	12	(1)
2012–2013	Greece U19	8	(0)
- * Club domestic league appearances and goals as of 26 June 2025 ‡ National team caps and goals as of 9 February 2024

Vasilios Karagounis (Greek: Βασίλειος Καραγκούνης, born 18 January 1994) is a Greek professional footballer who plays as a defensive midfielder for FC Feronikeli 74.

== Career ==
Karagounis started his career at Atromitos then moved to Italy for Udinese Primavera, from which Olympiacos bought him in the summer of 2012. For the 2013–14 season, he was loaned to Aris, where he played in 12 games in the Super League Greece and a Greek Cup match.

The season after, Karagounis agreed to go on loan to Reggina.

On 3 August 2015, Karagounis signed a year contract with AEL Limassol on loan from Olympiacos. The young defender passed the necessary medical tests and the Cypriot club announced his borrowing. On 1 February 2016, he signed a two-and-a-half-year contract with Iraklis for an undisclosed fee. On 15 September 2020 he joined Cypriot club Ermis Aradippou, after he was released from Platanias F.C. due to economic problems. On 18 August 2021, he signed with Erovnuli Liga side FC Torpedo Kutaisi.

In August 2024, he signed for FC Feronikeli 74.

== Personal life ==
His brother, Thanasis, is also a footballer.

== Honours ==
Torpedo Kutaisi

- Georgian Cup: 2022

AEL Limassol

- Cypriot Super Cup: 2015

Olympiacos

- Super League Greece: 2012–13
- Greek Football Cup: 2012–13
