= Panagiotis Ballas =

Greek professional footballer

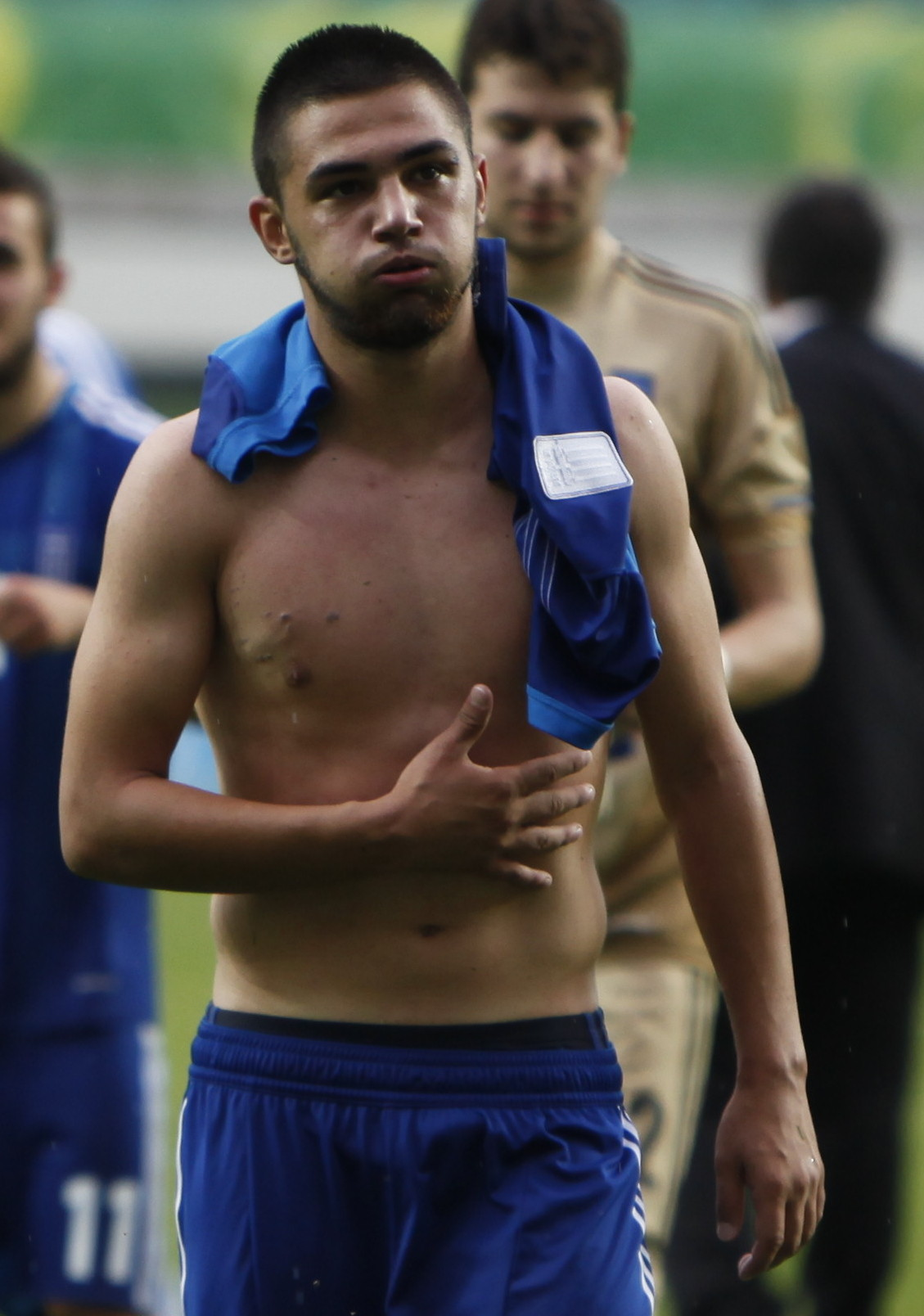

Personal information
- Full name: Panagiotis Ballas
- Date of birth: 6 September 1993 (age 33)
- Place of birth: Karditsa, Greece
- Height: 1.82 m (6 ft 0 in)
- Position: Defensive midfielder

Team information
- Current team: Trikala

Youth career
- –2008: Akadimia Elpides Karditsas
- 2008–2010: Atromitos

Senior career*
Years	Team	Apps	(Gls)
2010–2016	Atromitos	66	(0)
2016	Sonnenhof Großaspach	0	(0)
2017	Panionios	1	(0)
2017–2020	AEL	19	(0)
2020–2021	Apollon Larissa	23	(0)
2021–2023	Anagennisi Karditsa	48	(2)
2023	Egaleo	4	(0)
2024–2025	Ethnikos Neo Keramidi	14	(0)
2025–2026	Nestos Chrysoupoli	9	(0)
2026–	Trikala		

International career
2011–2012	Greece U19	14	(0)
2013	Greece U20	6	(0)
2012–2014	Greece U21	9	(0)
Medal record
Men's football
Representing Greece
UEFA European Under-19 Championship
Runner-up	2012 Estonia
- * Club domestic league appearances and goals as of 26 April 2026

Panagiotis Ballas (Greek: Παναγιώτης Μπάλλας, born 6 September 1993) is a Greek professional footballer who plays as a defensive midfielder for Gamma Ethniki club Trikala.

== Club career ==
Ballas joined Atromitos in 2008 from Akadimia Elpides Karditsas. He made his debut for the first team in a home game against Kavala, on the final matchday of the 2010–11 season.

In July 2016, Ballas joined German 3. Liga side Sonnenhof Großaspach. On 16 December 2016, Ballas mutually terminated his contract with the team. On 14 January 2017, he returned to Greece, where he joined Super League club Panionios.

On 8 September 2017, Ballas signed a three-year contract with AEL, on a free transfer. After limited game time with AEL, in the summer of 2020 he joined city rivals Apollon Larissa.

On 14 September 2021, Ballas joined Anagennisi Karditsa. After two seasons, on 29 August 2023 he joined Egaleo.

== Career statistics ==
=== Club ===
As of 12 February 2024

Appearances and goals by club season, and competition
Club	Season	League			Cup		Continental		Total	
Club	Season	Division	Apps	Goals	Apps	Goals	Apps	Goals	Apps	Goals
Atromitos	2010–11	Super League	1	0	0	0	—		1	0
Atromitos	2011–12	Super League	17	0	2	0	—		19	0
Atromitos	2012–13	Super League	7	0	1	0	0	0	8	0
Atromitos	2013–14	Super League	20	0	4	0	1 (Note: Appearances in UEFA Europa League)	0	25	0
Atromitos	2014–15	Super League	15	0	1	0	2	0	18	0
Atromitos	2015–16	Super League	6	0	4	0	2	0	12	0
Atromitos	Total		66	0	12	0	5	0	83	0
Sonnenhof Großaspach	2016–17	3. Liga	0	0	2	0	—		2	0
Panionios	2016–17	Super League Greece	1	0	0	0	—		1	0
AEL	2017–18	Super League	5	0	2	0	—		7	0
AEL	2018–19	Super League	6	0	2	0	—		8	0
AEL	2019–20	Super League	8	0	1	0	—		9	0
AEL	Total		19	0	5	0	0	0	24	0
Apollon Larissa	2020–21	Super League 2	23	0	0	0	—		23	0
Anagennisi Karditsa	2021–22	Super League 2	24	2	5	0	—		29	2
Anagennisi Karditsa	2022–23	Super League 2	24	0	0	0	—		24	0
Anagennisi Karditsa	Total		48	2	5	0	—		53	2
Egaleo	2023–24	Super League 2	4	0	0	0	—		4	0
Career total			161	2	24	0	5	0	133	0
