= Peristeri Stadium =

Football stadium in Athens, Greece

- Angelos Ramfos Stadium
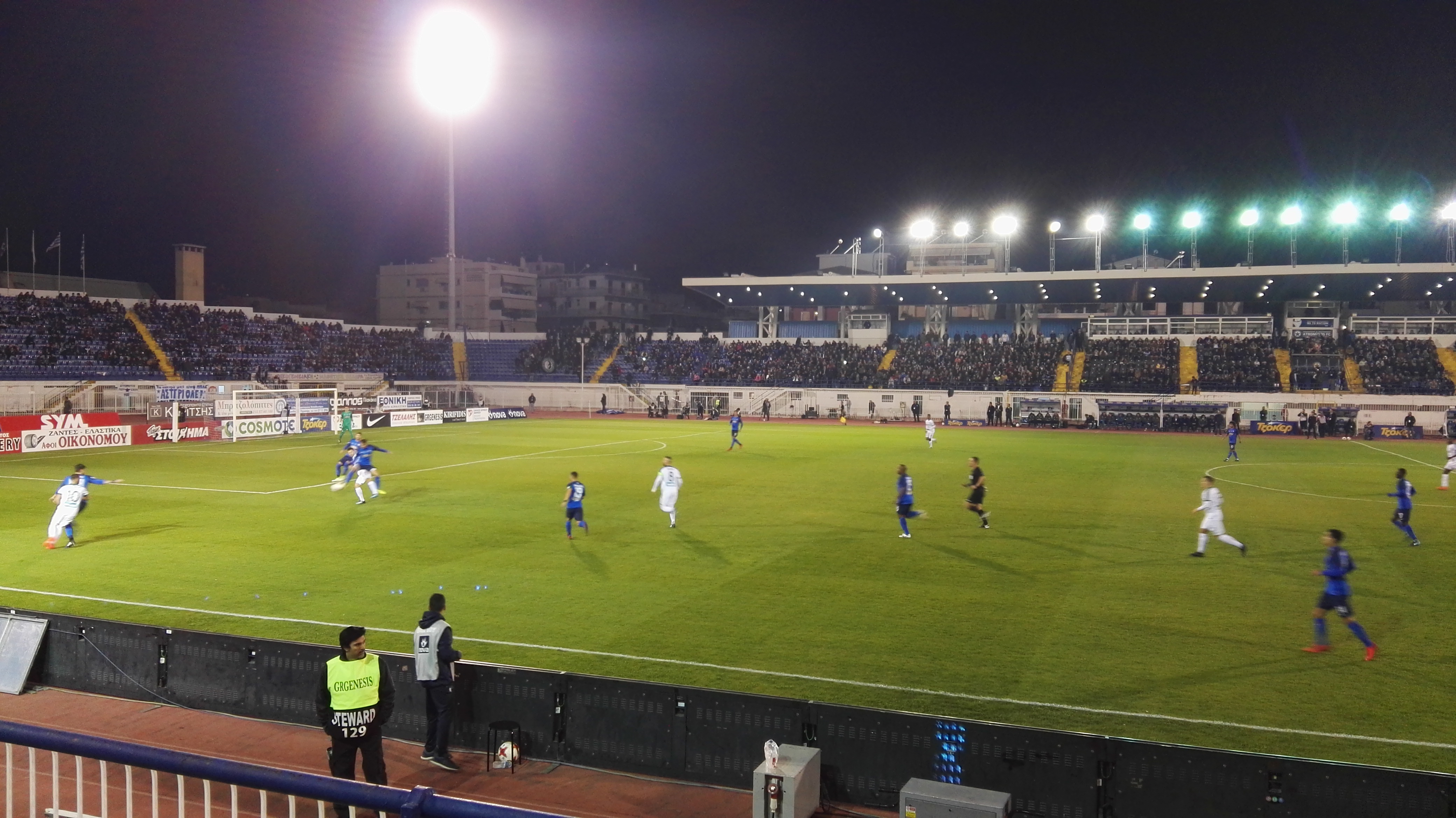
- Interactive map of Peristeri Stadium
- Location: Peristeri, Athens, Greece
- Coordinates: 38°0′17″N 23°41′23″E
- Owner: Municipality of Peristeri
- Operator: Atromitos
- Capacity: 9,035
- Surface: Grass
- Public transit: Agios Antonios metro station

Construction
- Built: 1947

Tenant
- Atromitos

Peristeri Stadium (also known as the Atromitos Stadium) is a multi-purpose stadium in Peristeri, a city and a suburb within the Athens agglomeration, Greece.

It is currently used mostly for football matches and is the home stadium of Atromitos. The stadium was built in 1947 and has a seating capacity of 8,969.
