= Michalis Kyrgias =

Greek footballer

Personal information
- Full name: Michail Kyrgias
- Date of birth: 14 October 1989 (age 37)
- Place of birth: Athens, Greece
- Height: 1.86 m (6 ft 1 in)
- Position: Centre-back

Youth career
- 2006–2009: Atromitos

Senior career*
Years	Team	Apps	(Gls)
2009	Ilioupoli	0	(0)
2009–2013	Apollon Smyrnis	37	(0)
2013–2014	Aris	23	(1)
2014–2020	Apollon Smyrnis	118	(2)
2020–2021	Ionikos	23	(1)
2021–2023	Athens Kallithea	41	(0)

International career^{‡}
2007–2008	Greece U19	5	(0)
- * Club domestic league appearances and goals as of 16 June 2023 ‡ National team caps and goals as of 17 July 2008

Michalis Kyrgias (Greek: Μιχάλης Κύργιας; born 14 October 1989) is a Greek former professional footballer who played as a centre-back.

== Career ==
Born in Athens, Kyrgias spent a total of 10 seasons with Apollon Smyrnis, helping the club rise from the third division to the top flight over that time, with his tenure only briefly interrupted by one season at Aris in Super League 1.

After leaving Apollon, Kyrgias moved to Ionikos for the 2020/21 season and immediately helped the club earn promotion to Super League 1.

In September 2021, Kyrgias signed for Athens Kallithea FC and was named team captain for the 2021/22 season.

In July 2023, Kyrgias retired from professional football.
