= Andreas Tatos =

Greek footballer

Personal information
- Date of birth: 11 May 1989 (age 37)
- Place of birth: Himarë, Albania
- Height: 1.74 m (5 ft 8 1/2 in)
- Position: Attacking midfielder

Team information
- Current team: Telos Agras

Senior career*
Years	Team	Apps	(Gls)
2007–2008	Haidari	38	(3)
2008–2011	Atromitos	55	(1)
2011–2014	Olympiacos	1	(0)
2011–2012	→ Atromitos (loan)	26	(2)
2012–2014	→ Aris (loan)	41	(8)
2014–2015	Atromitos	11	(0)
2015	Veria	12	(0)
2015–2017	Aris	56	(20)
2017–2018	Elazığspor	39	(10)
2019–2020	Altay	43	(8)
2020–2021	Xanthi	23	(5)
2021–2024	Kalamata	66	(11)
2024–2025	Pierikos		
2025–2026	Olympiacos Volos		
2026–	Telos Agras		
- * Club domestic league appearances and goals as of 22:30, 25 May 2024 (UTC).

Andreas Tatos (Greek: Ανδρέας Τάτος; born 11 May 1989) is a Greek professional footballer who plays as an attacking midfielder for Telos Agras.

== Early life ==
Tatos was born in Himara, Albania to ethnic Greek parents. His family was able to move to Greece after 1989, he originates from Himare along fellow footballer Sotiris Ninis with whom are very close due to their families coming from the same town.

== Club career ==
Tatos started his professional career by joining Atromitos at the summer of 2008. After three efficient years he joined Olympiacos from Atromitos on 19 August 2011 but he remained in his former club on a one-year loan.

He managed to get with Atromitos to two consecutive Greek Football Cup finals in 2011 and 2012. His participation in the final of the 2012 has been discussed among the fans, as being selected against the club to which he belonged.

At the end of the 2011/12 season, besides the fact that it was amongst the priorities of the Olympiakos' former coach Leonardo Jardim, due to the numerous quality midfielders in the club and the fact that it was difficult for him to play on a regular basis, Olympiacos decided to give him to Aris for the rest of the season 2012/13. Tatos joined again Olympiacos at the end of the season and participated in the summer club preparation, but for once more Olympiakos new coach Míchel decided to extend his loan for another year. Besides the fact that various Super League Greece clubs like him, he decided to join Aris, besides its financial problems.

However, Tatos with his left foot and unexpected inspirations was unable to progress in a football season where players with his own skills were rare in Greek courts. Aris enjoyed to have such a player but it must spread a veil of protection to the player, besides the tremendous economic problems, in order to provide him the opportunity to be selected for the 2014 FIFA World Cup.

On 27 June 2014, Tatos returned to his former team Atromitos. The transfer was completed at the offices of Olympiacos and immediately after Tatos said the following: "I am very happy to be back in the team that helped me improved as professional in my early football years. I will promise to give 100% to help Atromitos to achieve its goals and specifically in the preliminary round of Europa League. It is the third consecutive time and I hope to be the luckiest one. On a personal level, I wish to play for a third time in the Greek Cup final and lift it. Finally I like to thank President Mr. Georgios Spanos, coach Mr. Georgios Paraschos and the technical director Yiannis Angelopoulos who showed me how much they want me. I will always be grateful."

On 1 February 2015, Tatos left Atromitos. On the same day he was announced by Veria. After the announcement of the transfer he stated "I'm very happy that I signed to Veria. I would like to thank the president for trusting me. As it comes to me, I will give the very best of myself. Veria is an opportunity for me to resurrect my career." On 11 September 2015, he decided to sign to his former club Aris playing in Football League 2. He scored his first goal the opener from a free kick in a 3–1 home victory over Apollon Kalamarias.

On 21 July 2017, the experienced attacking midfielder of Aris, left the club, to continue his career in Turkish TFF First League club Elazığspor. The 28-year-old former international returned to Aris back in January 2016, but did not manage to help the club to return to Super League during his two-season spell. A day later, Tatos signed a two years' contract with the Turkish club with a €500,000 fee, while Aris except the undisclosed transfer fee kept a 30% future resale rate. On 9 September 2017, he scored his first goal with the club in a 3–2 away win against Denizlispor. On 22 October 2018, he scored his first goal for the 2018-19 season, sealing a 1–0 away win against Adana Demirspor.

On 5 January 2019, Andreas Tatos appealed against Elazığspor due to the financial inconsistency, stayed free and signed for a year-and-a-half in Altay for an undisclosed fee, continuing his career in Turkey's second division.

On 29 September 2020, he signed a year contract with Xanthi for an undisclosed fee.

== International career ==
On 5 August 2011, Tatos was one of the three new faces called by Fernando Santos to join Greece for the friendly match against Bosnia and Herzegovina, however he wasn't used.

In March 2014, according to some Albanian media, Tatos has been in contact with Alban Bushi, a manager at the Albanian Football Association. According to Bushi he has expressed his availability to play for Albania: since he was born there, he is eligible to play.

== Honours ==
=== Club ===
Atromitos

- Greek cup: Runner up (2010–11, 2011–12)
- Football League: Winner 2008–09

=== Individual ===
- He has won the MVP award in the highest Greek football league twice
