= Thanasis Karagounis =

Greek footballer (born 1991)

Personal information
- Full name: Athanasios Karagounis
- Date of birth: 25 September 1991 (age 35)
- Place of birth: Lamia, Greece
- Height: 1.77 m (5 ft 10 in)
- Positions: Winger; attacking midfielder

Youth career
- Akadimia Lamia
- Androutsos Gravia

Senior career*
Years	Team	Apps	(Gls)
2008–2009	Fokikos	30	(4)
2009–2014	Atromitos	80	(5)
2014–2018	Zwolle	21	(1)
2018–2019	Lamia	10	(0)
2019–2021	Apollon Smyrnis	8	(1)
2021–2022	A.E. Kifisia	12	(3)
2023	Proodeftiki	5	(0)
2023-24	Apollon Smyrnis	3	(0)

International career^{‡}
2010–2011	Greece U19	7	(0)
2011–2013	Greece U21	9	(2)
- * Club domestic league appearances and goals as of 2025 ‡ National team caps and goals as of 15 November 2011

Thanasis Karagounis (Greek: Θανάσης Καραγκούνης; born 25 September 1991) is a former Greek professional footballer who played as a winger or an attacking midfielder.

== Club career ==
=== Fokikos ===
Karagounis started his professional career in 2008 with Fokikos, making 30 appearances in the Football League 2 and scoring 4 goals.

=== Atromitos ===
In summer 2009 he joined the newly promoted Beta Ethniki champions Atromitos,.

He was part of the Atromitos team who were runners-up of the 2010–11 Greek Cup, after losing 0–3 to AEK Athens. Thanasis only made 2 appearances in Atromitos' way to the final, one as a starter against Anagennisi Giannitsa for the fourth phase and one as a substitute against Diagoras for the second leg of the quarter-finals. He scored his first goal with the club on 3 May 2014 in an away loss 2–1 against Twente.

=== Zwolle ===
In January 2014, he signed a 2.5-year contract with PEC Zwolle for a transfer fee of €300,000. He made his debut with the club in January, 18th as a substitute in a 1–2 home loss against Vitesse Arnhem. Karagounis injured on his lip during the Dutch cup match between PEC Zwolle and NEC Nijmegen at the IJsseldelta stadium on 26 March 2014 in Zwolle. On 25 November 2014, Karagounis injured again suffering a cruciate ligament rupture losing the rest of the 2014–15 season.

In July 2015, after a very difficult year for the defender marred by injury (185 days to be exact), according to Voetbal International, Karagounis' return was postponed when there was a setback during his rehabilitation from a cruciate ligament injury. It remained a question whether there is a need for another operation. Eventually he lost the whole season and returned to the squad on 30 June 2016.

In April 2016, PEC Zwolle renewed Karagounis' contract for two seasons, till the summer of 2018, despite his severe injury that kept him out of action for the whole season. There is also an option included in his contract for one more season.

After a very difficult year for the midfielder marred by injury (363 days to be exact), Karagounis returned to action in a 4–1 away win game against DVS '33 for the 2016–17 KNVB Cup. On 2 October 2016, he made his reappearance in the championship as a late substitute in a 2–1 home win against ADO Den Haag. On 17 February 2017, he suffered a new knee injury, a second during the 2016–17 season, and the medical predictions estimate his return to action in six months.

In the beginning of 2017–18 season after a third difficult season marred by injury (219 days to be exact), PEC Zwolle announced Karagounis that he could continue his career elsewhere as his not in the plans of club's coach John van 't Schip, besides the fact that his contract is still in force. According to Dutch websites the player will probably sign a contract with Ekstraklasa club Korona Kielce in the January transfer window, but the transfer was not completed and the Greek midfielder is still searching for the next club in his career.

=== Lamia ===
On 3 July 2018, Lamia announced the signing of the Greek midfielder for an undisclosed fee.

=== Apollon Smyrnis ===
On 14 August 2019, Apollon Smyrnis announced the signing of the Greek midfielder for an undisclosed fee.

== International career ==
Thanasis Karagounis made 7 appearances for Greece U19. He is currently a member of the under-21 team, making 9 appearances for them so far.

== Personal life ==
His brother, Vasilios, is also a professional footballer, who is currently playing for [Greek] second division club Kalamata. Although he shares the same surname as Giorgos Karagounis, the former captain of Greece, it was revealed at a joint interview of both players that they are not related.

== Career statistics ==
=== Club ===
As of 30 April 2021

Appearances and goals by club, season and competition
Club	Season	League			Cup		Europe		Other		Total	
Club	Season	Division	Apps	Goals	Apps	Goals	Apps	Goals	Apps	Goals	Apps	Goals
Fokikos	2008–09	Football League 2	30	4	1	0	0	0	–		31	4
Atromitos	2009–10	Super League Greece	11	1	0	0	0	0	–		11	1
Atromitos	2010–11	Super League Greece	13	0	2	0	0	0	–		15	0
Atromitos	2011–12	Super League Greece	21	1	4	2	0	0	–		25	3
Atromitos	2012–13	Super League Greece	23	2	1	0	1	0	5	3	30	5
Atromitos	2013–14	Super League Greece	12	1	1	1	2	1	–		15	3
Atromitos	Total		80	5	8	3	3	1	5	3	96	12
Zwolle	2013–14	Eredivisie	12	1	2	0	0	0	–		14	1
Zwolle	2014–15	Eredivisie	3	0	2	1	0	0	–		5	1
Zwolle	2015–16	Eredivisie	0	0	0	0	0	0	–		0	0
Zwolle	2016–17	Eredivisie	5	0	2	0	0	0	–		7	0
Zwolle	2017–18	Eredivisie	1	0	0	0	0	0	–		1	0
Zwolle	Total		21	1	6	1	0	0	0	0	27	2
Lamia	2018–19|Super League Greece	10	0	3	0	0	0	–		13	0	
Apollon Smyrnis	2019–20	Super League Greece 2	6	1	2	0	0	0	–		8	1
Apollon Smyrnis	2020–21	Super League Greece	2	0	1	0	0	0	–		3	0
Career total			149	11	21	4	3	1	5	3	178	19

== Honours ==
Zwolle

- KNVB Cup: 2013–14
- Johan Cruijff Shield: 2014
