= Chigozie Udoji =

Nigerian footballer (born 1986)

Chigozie Udoji Mitko Georgiev
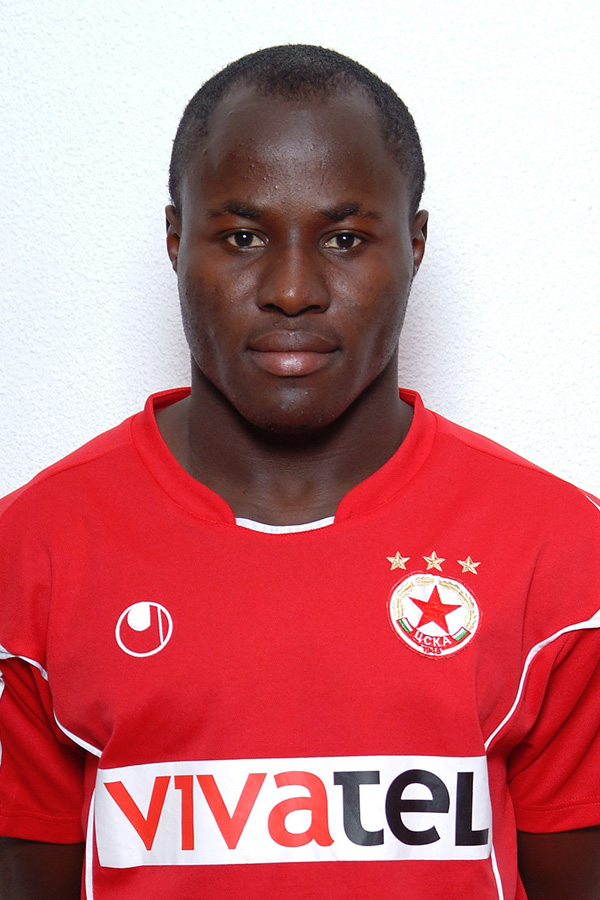
- Udoji with CSKA Sofia

Personal information
- Full name: Mitko Atanasov Georgiev
- Birth name: Chigozie Shaloze Udoji
- Date of birth: 16 July 1986 (age 40)
- Place of birth: Lagos, Nigeria
- Height: 1.72 m (5 ft 8 in)
- Position: Striker

Youth career
- 2003–2004: Julius Berger

Senior career*
Years	Team	Apps	(Gls)
2004–2006	Vihren Sandanski	67	(18)
2007–2009	CSKA Sofia	55	(6)
2009–2011	Asteras Tripolis	49	(5)
2011	Astra Ploieşti	8	(0)
2012	Braşov	6	(0)
2012–2013	Platanias	17	(4)
2013	Atromitos	16	(2)
2013	Aris	13	(5)
2014–2015	Dinamo Minsk	46	(17)
2016	Qingdao Jonoon	25	(6)
2017	Lillestrøm	25	(3)
2018	Platanias	10	(2)
2018–2021	Enosis Neon Paralimni	77	(8)
2021–2022	Achyronas Liopetriou	1	(0)
2022	Welling United	0	(0)
2022–2023	Vihren Sandanski	18	(3)

International career
2007	Bulgaria U21	1	(2)
- * Club domestic league appearances and goals

Chigozie Udoji (born 16 July 1986), also known by his Bulgarian name Mitko Georgiev (Bulgarian: Митко Георгиев), is a Nigerian former professional footballer who played as a striker.

== Club career ==
Udoji moved to Bulgaria in 2004 and was initially signed by Vihren Sandanski. In 2007, he was transferred to CSKA Sofia where he stayed until the summer of 2009. The Nigerian then played for Asteras Tripolis in Greece before relocating to Romania in 2011. He scored two goals for Atromitos, both against OFI, before leaving the club. Udoji joined Aris in July 2013. He scored three goals in his first unofficial match, against National Gazoros. He was part of the Belarusian Premier League team Dinamo Minsk's squad between March 2014 and late January 2016, appearing in 70 matches, scoring 21 goals and making 7 assists in all tournaments. On 3 March 2017, he moved to Norwegian club Lillestrøm. Udoji joined Cypriot side Enosis Neon Paralimni in the summer of 2018.

== International career ==
In 2007 Udoji played for Bulgaria U21 in a friendly match against Greece U21. He scored two goals. The result of the match was a 4–1 win for Bulgaria. He was subsequently found to be ineligible and could from then on only represent Nigeria.

== Personal life ==
In July 2006, Udoji received a Bulgarian passport and a Bulgarian name, Mitko Atanasov Georgiev.

== Career statistics ==
=== Club ===
As of 11 March 2023

Appearances and goals by club, season and competition
Club	Season	League			Cup		Continental		Other		Total	
Club	Season	Division	Apps	Goals	Apps	Goals	Apps	Goals	Apps	Goals	Apps	Goals
Asteras Tripolis	2009–10	Super League Greece	26	3	2	1	—		—		28	4
Asteras Tripolis	2010–11	Super League Greece	23	2	1	0	—		0	0	24	2
Asteras Tripolis	Total		49	5	3	1	—		0	0	52	6
Astra Ploieşti	2011–12	Liga I	8	0	2	0	—		—		10	0
Braşov	2011–12	Liga I	6	0	0	0	—		—		6	0
Platanias	2012–13	Super League Greece	17	4	0	0	—		—		17	4
Atromitos	2012–13	Super League Greece	16	2	0	0	—		—		16	2
Aris	2013–14	Super League Greece	13	5	0	0	—		—		13	5
Dinamo Minsk	2014	Belarusian Premier League	28	7	0	0	—		—		28	7
Dinamo Minsk	2015	Belarusian Premier League	18	10	3	0	10	5	—		31	15
Dinamo Minsk	2016	Belarusian Premier League	0	0	4	0	7	0	—		11	0
Dinamo Minsk	Total		46	17	7	0	17	5	—		70	22
Qingdao Jonoon	2016	China League One	25	6	0	0	—		—		25	6
Lillestrøm	2017	Eliteserien	24	3	6	0	—		—		30	3
Platanias	2017–18	Super League Greece	10	2	0	0	—		—		10	2
Enosis Neon Paralimni	2018–19	Cypriot First Division	29	4	7	4	—		—		36	8
Enosis Neon Paralimni	2019–20	Cypriot First Division	20	2	3	1	—		—		23	3
Enosis Neon Paralimni	2020–21	Cypriot First Division	28	2	1	0	—		—		29	2
Enosis Neon Paralimni	Total		77	8	11	5	—		—		88	13
Achyronas Liopetriou	2021–22	Cypriot Second Division	1	0	1	0	—		—		2	0
Vihren Sandanski	2022–23	Third Amateur Football League	18	3	1	1	—		—		19	4
Career total			310	55	31	7	17	5	0	0	358	67

== Honours ==
CSKA Sofia

- Bulgarian League: 2007–08
- Bulgarian Supercup: 2008

Lillestrøm

- Norwegian Football Cup: 2017
