= P.A.O. Koufalia F.C. =

Greek football club

P.A.O. Koufalia
- Founded: 1964; 62 years ago
- Ground: Koufalia Municipal Stadium
- Capacity: 400
- Chairman: Christos Makidis
- Manager: Petros Kontsidis
- League: Macedonia FCA First Division
- 2025–26: Macedonia FCA First Division (Group 1), 4th
- Website: http://www.paokoufalion.gr/

P.A.O. Koufalia Football Club is a Greek football club, based in Koufalia, Thessaloniki, Greece.

== History ==
PAO Koufalia has numerous appearances in the Delta Ethniki, where it competed for the majority of the past 30 years. A major moment in the club's history was winning the local Macedonia FCA championship in the summer of 1975, competing in the 1975 Greek Football Amateur Championship for a spot in the Beta Ethniki against Rigas Feraios, which was ultimately missed following a play-off match held in Kozani. In 2017, the club won the Macedonia FCA Cup for the first time, having previously been a runner-up on four occasions. In 2018, it captured the Macedonia FCA championship once again and earned historic promotion to the Gamma Ethniki for the first time in its history.

== Honours ==
=== Domestic ===
  - Macedonia FCA champion: 5
    - 1984–85, 1996–97, 2002–03, 2008–09, 2017–18
  - Macedonia FCA Cup Winners : 1
    - 2016–17
