= Stathis Tavlaridis =

Greek footballer

Personal information
- Full name: Efstathios Tavlaridis
- Date of birth: 25 January 1980 (age 46)
- Place of birth: Provatas, Serres, Greece
- Height: 1.86 m (6 ft 1 in)
- Position: Centre-back

Senior career*
Years	Team	Apps	(Gls)
1997–2001	Iraklis	65	(1)
2001–2004	Arsenal	1	(0)
2003	→ Portsmouth (loan)	4	(0)
2004	→ Lille (loan)	16	(0)
2004–2007	Lille	77	(2)
2007–2010	Saint-Étienne	64	(0)
2010–2011	AEL	24	(0)
2011–2012	OFI	25	(0)
2012–2014	Atromitos	61	(4)
2014–2017	Panathinaikos	39	(2)
2017	Aris	15	(1)
Total		391	(10)

International career
1999	Greece U18	3	(0)
1999–2001	Greece U21	19	(2)
2005–2015	Greece	3	(0)
- * Club domestic league appearances and goals

Efstathios "Stathis" Tavlaridis (Greek: Στάθης Ταυλαρίδης; born 25 January 1980) is a Greek former professional footballer who played as a centre-back. His aggressive style of play earned him the nickname "Taureau" (The Bull) among French supporters.

== Club career ==
=== England ===
Tavlaridis was born in Serres. He started his career at Iraklis, debuting at the age of 17, and was transferred to Arsenal in 2001 for £1m. He never fully broke into the first team, unable to displace Sol Campbell and Kolo Touré, and was loaned to Portsmouth as a result. There, he made four appearances as Pompey won the First Division Championship and promotion to the Premier League. He made eight appearances for Arsenal, all but one of them in the League Cup. He made his Premier League debut in 2002–03 season against Southampton, where Arsenal rested many of their players for the upcoming FA Cup Final, also against Southampton.

=== Lille ===
On 29 April 2004, Tavlaridis was transferred from Arsenal to Lille on a four-year contract after having been loaned there early in the year. In his spell with the club he continually created a great deal of interest and attention from several other teams. With regard to Tavlaridis's time at Lille, he has regularly featured within both Champions League and Ligue 1 games for Les Dogues. His debut was in the first leg of a Champions League tie against AEK at the Stade Pierre-Mauroy in October 2006, of which eventually finished 3–1 to the hosts. All in all, Tavlaridis in 2011 described his spell with Lille as "the most beautiful page of his career".

=== Saint-Étienne ===
Despite being linked with a hosts of Ligue 1 clubs, notably Bordeaux, Marseille, and Monaco, Tavlaridis announced that he was signing with Saint-Étienne for €2.5m after agreeing to a three-year deal with the club. Tavlaridis was handed the number 4 shirt and quickly inserted into the first eleven forming partnerships with Moustapha Bayal Sall. Tavlaridis made his debut against his former club Lille and was applauded by the Lille home fans.

Tavlaridis got off to a great start for the 2007–08 season scoring his first goal with Saint-Étienne in a 2–1 victory over Sochaux the following week. Tavlaridis was contract in the summer of 2009 with Saint-Étienne and a number of Premier League clubs were at the time believed to be prepared to offer him a route back to England. With this being so, he was named as the club's permanent captain by manager Alain Perrin following the first league match of the 2009–10 Ligue 1 season, after having served as vice-captain the previous season. Tavlaridis was removed as captain shortly due to his long-term injury. This move saw his playing time reduced, where he played only six more matches in that season for Saint-Étienne. Tavlaridis in all made 69 appearances for the Ligue 1 team, scoring twice.

=== AEL ===
On 30 April 2010, AEL announced that an agreement had been reached with the 29-year-old centre-back who would join the club in the summer on a free transfer, when his contract with les Verts had been finally wound down. Nicknamed 'Taureau' in France because of his bullish style of play, the Greek was initially a success in Ligue 1 with Lille and then Saint-Étienne, though he fell out of favour at the Stade Geoffroy-Guichard earlier in the season under head coach Alain Perrin. When the former Lyon boss was axed, Tavlaridis had an immediate chance to impress under Christophe Galtier, though his red card against Marseille ten minutes into Galtier's first game in charge effectively ended his first team career with les Verts. Tavlaridis signed a four-year deal.

On 9 August 2011, however, Tavlaridis terminated his contract, following the team's relegation to the Football League.

=== OFI ===
On 24 August 2011, Tavlaridis signed a one-year contract for OFI, who then were newly promoted to the Super League Greece. The ex-footballer and president of the club Nikos Machlas wanted to add to the roster a very experienced defender, who could also play the role of the defence leader. The annual salary was fixed to €150,000. However, due to the club's financial difficulties and payment inconsistencies, he decided to leave the club on 24 April 2012, before the 2011–12 campaign for OFI was over.

=== Atromitos ===
On 2 June 2012, Tavlaridis agreed to sign for Atromitos.

In February 2014, Tavlaridis agreed to extend his contract till June 2016.

=== Panathinaikos ===
In December 2014, Atromitos announced that Tavlaridis was transferred to Panathinaikos. Tavlaridis was delighted to sign with Panathinaikos, the team which he supported in his youth. On 11 January 2015, he scored his first goal in a match against Ergotelis. It was his second appearance with the team and the first in its home ground Leoforos Alexandras Stadium. Tavlaridis with Panathinaikos also scored in the game with PAOK in Touba for playoffs brought the club to practically within one point from clinching a spot in next season's UEFA Champions League qualifiers.

Moreover, Tavlaridis has joined a star-studded array of international active and retired players for the 12th Annual Match Against Poverty which will take place on 20 April at the Geoffroy-Guichard Stadium in Saint-Etienne, France. He will play along Didier Drogba, Ronaldo and Zinedine Zidane all of them UNDP Goodwill Ambassadors, for a match against a Saint-Étienne All Stars team to help boost Ebola recovery efforts. On 30 December 2015, Tavlaridis verbally agreeing to renew his contract with the Greens until the summer of 2017 and promising that, in January, he would put pen to paper, which he eventually did five days later. On 19 June 2016, Tavlaridis is not considered among Andrea Stramaccioni's plans. Panathinaikos tried to offload him over the summer but the Greek defender did not manage to find a club to continue playing.

On 12 January 2017, Tavlaridis was another footballer (after Michael Essien, Rasmus Thelander, Jens Wemmer and Niklas Hult) in eight months to file an appeal against Panathinaikos over delayed payments. In his appeal, Tavlaridis claimed for an amount that covered his compensation during his career at the club. On 11 May 2017, the committee of the Greek Football Federation's financial disputes gave the player the amount of €272,000.

=== Aris ===
On 2 February 2017, Aris announced the signing of Tavlaridis, who had been recently released from Panathinaikos, until the summer of 2018.

== International career ==
Tavlaridis managed to play only twice for Greece in 2005 FIFA Confederations Cup, having fallen out of favor with coach Otto Rehhagel as well as Akis Zikos, Ieroklis Stoltidis, Grigoris Georgatos, Nikos Lyberopoulos and Vasilios Tsartas. After ten years and the amazing 2014–2015 season with Atromitos and Panathinaikos he was called up by Markarian for the games against Faroe Islands for the preliminary round of UEFA Euro 2016 and the friendly game against Poland. On 17 June 2015, in a friendly match against Poland, at the beginning of the second half, he wore the jersey of the Greek team after almost ten years, by replacing Sokratis Papastathopoulos.

== Dispute with Panathinaikos ==
On 27 February 2018, the administration of financially struggling Panathinaikos managed to agree terms with veteran international central defender, Tavlaridis. The Greens will finally pay €80,000 to the 38-year-old former defender, who was a member of the historic Athens club between January 2015 and January 2017, and therefore avoid a possible three-point deduction from the Hellenic Football Federation.

== Career statistics ==
=== Club ===
Appearances and goals by club, season and competition
Club	Season	League			Cup (Note: Includes Coupe de France, Coupe de la Ligue, EFL Cup, FA Cup and Greek Football Cup.)		Continental (Note: Includes UEFA Champions League, UEFA Intertoto Cup and UEFA Cup.)		Total	
Club	Season	Division	Apps	Goals	Apps	Goals	Apps	Goals	Apps	Goals
Iraklis	1997–98	Alpha Ethniki	2	0	–		1	0	3	0
Iraklis	1998–99	Alpha Ethniki	13	1	–		–		13	1
Iraklis	1999–2000	Alpha Ethniki	23	0	–		–		23	0
Iraklis	2000–01	Alpha Ethniki	27	0	–		4	0	31	0
Iraklis	Total		65	1	0	0	5	0	70	1
Arsenal	2001–02	Premier League	–		3	0	–		3	0
Arsenal	2002–03	Premier League	1	0	1	0	–		2	0
Arsenal	2003–04	Premier League	–		3	0	–		3	0
Arsenal	Total		1	0	7	0	0	0	8	0
Portsmouth (loan)	2002-03	Championship	4	0	1	0	–		5	0
Lille (loan)	2003–04	Ligue 1	16	0	1	0	–		17	0
Lille	2004–05	Ligue 1	30	0	2	0	9	0	41	0
Lille	2005–06	Ligue 1	26	1	2	1	7	0	35	2
Lille	2006–07	Ligue 1	21	1	3	0	7	0	31	1
Lille	Total		77	2	7	1	23	0	107	3
Saint-Étienne	2007–08	Ligue 1	34	0	2	0	–		36	0
Saint-Étienne	2008–09	Ligue 1	24	0	–		7	0	31	0
Saint-Étienne	2009–10	Ligue 1	6	0	1	0	–		7	0
Saint-Étienne	Total		64	0	3	0	7	0	74	0
AEL	2010-11	Super League	24	0	–		–		24	0
OFI	2011-12	Super League	25	0	–		–		25	0
Atromitos	2012–13	Super League	21	1	–		–		21	1
Atromitos	2013–14	Super League	30	3	–		1	0	31	3
Atromitos	2014–15	Super League	10	0	–		2	1	12	1
Atromitos	Total		61	4	0	0	3	1	64	5
Panathinaikos	2014–15	Super League	20	1	2	0	–		22	1
Panathinaikos	2015–16	Super League	19	1	3	1	4	0	26	2
Panathinaikos	Total		39	2	5	1	4	0	48	3
Aris	2016-17	Football League	15	1	–		–		15	1
Career total			391	10	24	2	42	1	457	13

== Honours ==
Lille

- UEFA Intertoto Cup: 2004

Individual

- Super League Greece Team of the Season: 2013–14, 2014–15
