= Charalampos Ikonomopoulos =

Greek footballer

Personal information
- Date of birth: 9 January 1991 (age 35)
- Place of birth: Eleusis, Greece
- Height: 1.84 m (6 ft 1/2 in)
- Position: Centre-back

Youth career
- 2005–2007: Panelefsiniakos
- 2007–2008: Asteras Magoula
- 2008–2010: Aris

Senior career*
Years	Team	Apps	(Gls)
2009–2014	Aris	39	(1)
2012–2013	→ Vyzas (loan)	17	(0)
2014–2015	Chania	17	(1)
2015–2018	Sparta	54	(3)
2018–2019	Olympiacos Volos	0	(0)
2019–2020	Trikala	20	(1)
2020–2021	Egaleo	17	
2021–2022	P.A.O. Rouf		
2022-	Panelefsiniakos		
- * Club domestic league appearances and goals as of 19:42, 9 February 2024 (UTC)

Charalampos Ikonomopoulos (Greek: Χαράλαμπος Οικονομόπουλος; born 9 January 1991) is a Greek professional footballer who plays as a centre-back.

== Career ==
=== Aris ===
Ikonomopoulos is a professional player of Aris from 2009, when the Aris' coach, Mazinho, showed his faith to him. He made his professional debut in the match against Asteras Tripolis in Kleanthis Vikelidis stadium n 90' minute, when coach at the team, was Hector Raul Cuper.
