= History of PAOK FC =

History of a Greek football club

PAOK FC (Greek: ΠΑΕ ΠΑΟΚ, ['pa.ok]), short for "Pan-Thessalonian Athletic Club of Constantinopolitans" (Greek: Πανθεσσαλονίκειος Αθλητικός Όμιλος Κωνσταντινουπολιτών, romanized: Panthessaloníkios Athlitikós Ómilos Konstadinoupolitón), and commonly known as PAOK Thessaloniki, PAOK Salonika or simply PAOK, is a professional football club based in Thessaloniki, Macedonia, Greece. PAOK are one of the top domestic clubs, the most successful and widely supported in Northern Greece.

Established on 20 April 1926 by Greek refugees who fled to Thessaloniki from Constantinople in the wake of the Greco-Turkish War (1919–1922), they play their home games at Toumba Stadium, a 29,000 seating capacity football ground. Their name, along with the club's emblem, the Byzantine-style double-headed eagle with retracted wings, honours the memory of the people and places (mostly from the city of Constantinople) that once belonged to the Eastern Roman Empire. PAOK currently plays in the top-flight Super League, which they have won four times (in 1976, 1985, 2019 and 2024). They are eight-time winners of the Greek Cup (in 1972, 1974, 2001, 2003, 2017, 2018, 2019 and 2021). The club is one of the three which have never been relegated from the top national division and the only team in Greece that have won the Double (in 2019) going unbeaten (26–4–0 record) in a national round-robin league tournament (league format since 1959).

The team has appeared several times in the UEFA Europa League, but has yet to reach the group stage of the UEFA Champions League. PAOK have reached the quarter-finals of a European competition three times; once in the 1973–74 European Cup Winners' Cup and twice in the UEFA Conference League, in the 2021–22 and 2023–24 seasons. PAOK is the only Greek team that has more wins than losses in their European record (102 wins, 71 draws and 91 defeats, as of 26 February 2026) and the 0–7 away UEFA Cup win over Locomotive Tbilisi on 16 September 1999 is the largest ever achieved by a Greek football club in all European competitions.

== Foundation and early years (1926–1939) ==
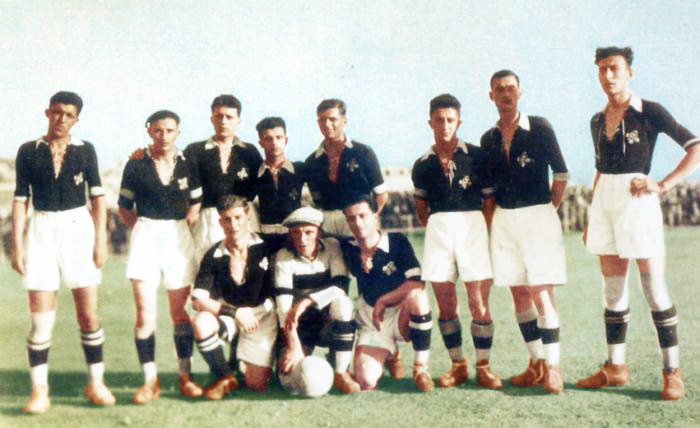
PAOK in 1926 Standing (left to right): Andreadis, Makaronopoulos, Vlachou, Pantermalis, Pagalos, Tsolakidis, Lianopoulos, Georgiadis Seated: Christidis, Papadopoulos, Ventourelis

PAOK FC is the oldest department of the major multi-sport club AC P.A.O.K., which is closely linked with Hermes Sports Club, that was formed in 1875 by the Greek community of Pera, a district of Istanbul (Constantinople).

The football club was founded in April 1926 by Constantinopolitans who fled to Thessaloniki after the Greek defeat in the Greco-Turkish War. PAOK's policy was to be open to every citizen of Thessaloniki, leading to a minor rivalry with AEK Thessalonikis, the other Constantinopolitan club of the city, in which only refugees were allowed to play. Both clubs were founded by Enosis Konstantinoupoliton Thessalonikis (E.K.Th.), a social and political organisation. The original logo of PAOK was a horseshoe and a four-leaf clover.

PAOK played their primary friendly match on 4 May 1926 at the stadium of Thermaikos, defeating Megas Alexandros Thessaloniki 2–1. The first coach of the club was Kostas Andreadis who spent five years on the team's bench without demanding payment. Their first captain was Michalis Ventourelis.

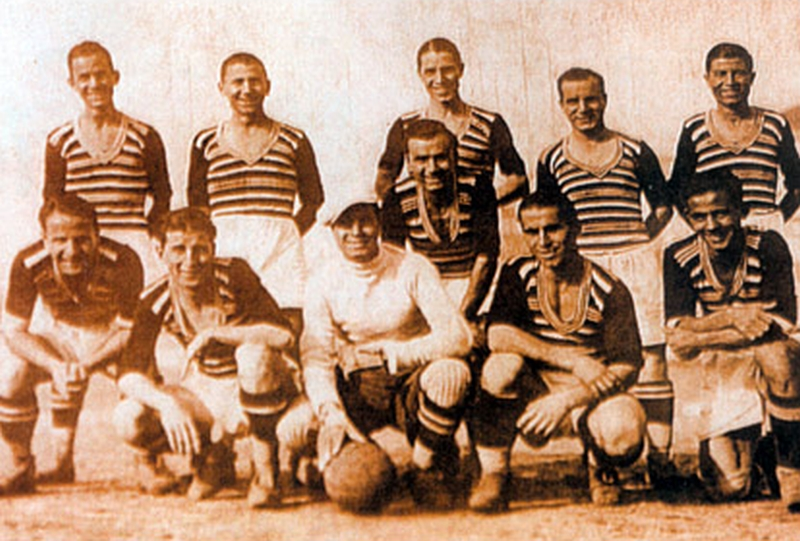
PAOK in 1937 Standing (left to right): Bostantzoglou, Kontopoulos, Ioannidis, Kalogiannis, Vafiadis Seated: Panidis, Anastasiadis, Sotiriadis, Kosmidis, Moschidis, Vasiliadis

In 1926–1927 season, PAOK participated in the 2nd tier of Macedonia Football Clubs Association (Greek: Ένωση Ποδοσφαιρικών Σωματείων Μακεδονίας or Ε.Π.Σ.Μ.) local Macedonia championship. PAOK FC historic inaugural official match was a 3–1 win against Nea Genea Kalamarias on 12 December 1926. PAOK finished at the top of the 2nd division and faced the 1st division teams in post-season classification matches, defeating all of them: Thermaikos 4–1, Aris 2–1, Atlas Ippodromiou (w/o) and Iraklis 1–0. In 1927–1928, PAOK participated for the first time in the 1st tier of Macedonian league.

The first professional contract was signed by the club on 5 September 1928. The contract stipulated that the French footballer Raymond Etienne (of Jewish descent from Pera Club) would be paid 4,000 drachmas per month. The contract was signed by Dr. Meletiou, the PAOK chairman, and Mr. Sakellaropoulos, the Hon. Secretary.

In March 1929, Athlitiki Enosis Konstantinoupoliton Thessalonikis (AEK Thessaloniki) was disbanded as a sports club and their members joined PAOK. PAOK thereupon changed their emblem, adopting the Double-headed eagle, as a symbol of the club's Byzantine/Constantinopolitan heritage. PAOK also got possession of AEK facilities located around Syntrivani (i.e. Fountain Square), next to the Children's Heritage Foundation, where today stands the Faculty of Theology of the Aristotle University of Thessaloniki. The same year PAOK and Enosis Konstantinoupoliton Thessalonikis (E.K.Th.) wanted to expand the football ground, but they faced problems with the underground flow of the river. Finally, after technical works the keystone was put on 12 December 1930.

In 1930–1931, PAOK made their debut in the Panhellenic Championship, playing their first match on 1 February 1931 against Olympiacos at Piraeus, where they were defeated by 3–1, and ended the season in 5th place. The first foreign coach in team's history was Austrian Rudolf Gasner, who served at PAOK in 1931–1932. On 5 June 1932 the Syntrivani Stadium was inaugurated with PAOK's 3–2 victory over Iraklis. Syntrivani meant to be their home ground for 27 years.

In 1937, PAOK won their first regional title, the Macedonia championship (Greek: Ε.Π.Σ.Μ.) and participated in the Panhellenic Championship, finishing 2nd. The 1937 team included: Sotiriadis, Vatikis, Goulios, Kontopoulos, Bostantzoglou, Panidis, Glaros, Kritas, Ioannidis, Kalogiannis, Koukoulas, Kosmidis, Apostolou, Vafiadis, Vasiliadis, Anastasiadis, Moschidis, Tzakatzoglou, Zakapidas.

== Greco-Italian War and World War II (1939–1945) ==
On 28 May 1939, PAOK competed for first time in a Greek Cup final against AEK Athens and were defeated 2–1 at Leoforos Alexandras Stadium. The following season, PAOK won the Northern Greece Championship and reached the two-legged final of the Panhellenic Championship, but they lost 5–3 on aggregate to AEK Athens.

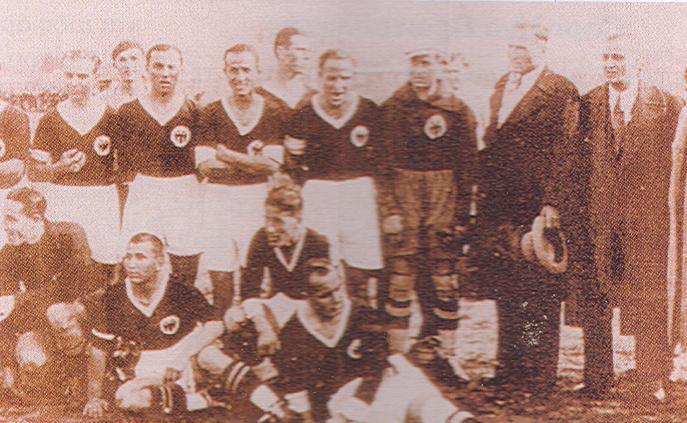
The team of 1939

The declaration of the Greco-Italian War caused mobilization in Greece and ended every sport activity. PAOK football players recruited to Hellenic Army and two of them died on duty: left defender Georgios Vatikis and goalkeeper Nikolaos Sotiriadis. They were among four Greek footballers who died in the war (the others were Spyridon Kontoulis of AEK Athens and Mimis Pierrakos of Panathinaikos). Georgios Vatikis, the first Greek athlete to fall on the Greek-Italian front, served as a warrant officer. He was 22 years old when he died in Battle of Morava–Ivan. After his death, Vatikis was honorarily promoted to lieutenant and awarded the Silver Cross of Valour and the Homeland of Gratitude. Nikolaos Sotiriadis, who played from 1932 until 1940 for PAOK, died on 28 January 1941 in Kleisura, fighting with the rank of Sergeant for the 5th Infantry Regiment. He was 33 years old.

== Macedonia Football Clubs Association League (1946–1959) ==
After the World War II, in the early 1950s, PAOK Academy was created by the Austrian coach, Wilhelm (Willy) Sevcik, and was known as the "chicos of Willi". From the newly founded academy sprang some great football players of the period, such as Leandros Symeonidis, Giannelos Margaritis and Giorgos Havanidis.

In 1948, PAOK won their second Macedonia Championship, and then participated in the final phase of the Panhellenic Championship where they were ranked third. PAOK footballers dedicated the title to the memory of team captain, Thrasyvoulos Panidis, who had lost his life (18 February 1948) in the civil war few days before. Panidis played for PAOK since 1930 and had 122 appearances. In 1950, they became champions of Macedonia for a third time, and the following year (1950–51), the team reached their second Greek Cup final, but lost 4–0 to Olympiacos at Leoforos Alexandras Stadium.

During the summer transfer period of 1953 Kouiroukidis, Petridis, Progios, Geroudis, Kemanidis, Chassiotis and Angelidis joined the team. The arrival of Lampis Kouiroukidis from Doxa Drama was vital and alongside Lefteris Papadakis and Christophoros Yientzis, they formed a famous attacking trio.

For four consecutive seasons (1954, 1955, 1956, 1957), PAOK won the Macedonia championship and participated in the Panhellenic Championship, finishing fourth each year. Yientzis was the top scorer in 1953–54 season and Kouiroukidis in 1955–56 season. Coached by Nikos Pangalos, PAOK won the 1954 and 1955 local Macedonia championship unbeaten. In 1955, PAOK participated in a third Greek Cup final and were defeated 2–0 by Panathinaikos at Leoforos Alexandras Stadium (home ground of Panathinaikos). Ιn 1956, under Hungarian coach Erman Hoffman they won their third consecutive unbeaten local championship. The successful 4-year period ended with 1957 championship, coached by the Austrian Walter Pfeiffer.

== Toumba Stadium and rise of Giorgos Koudas to prominence (1959–1969) ==
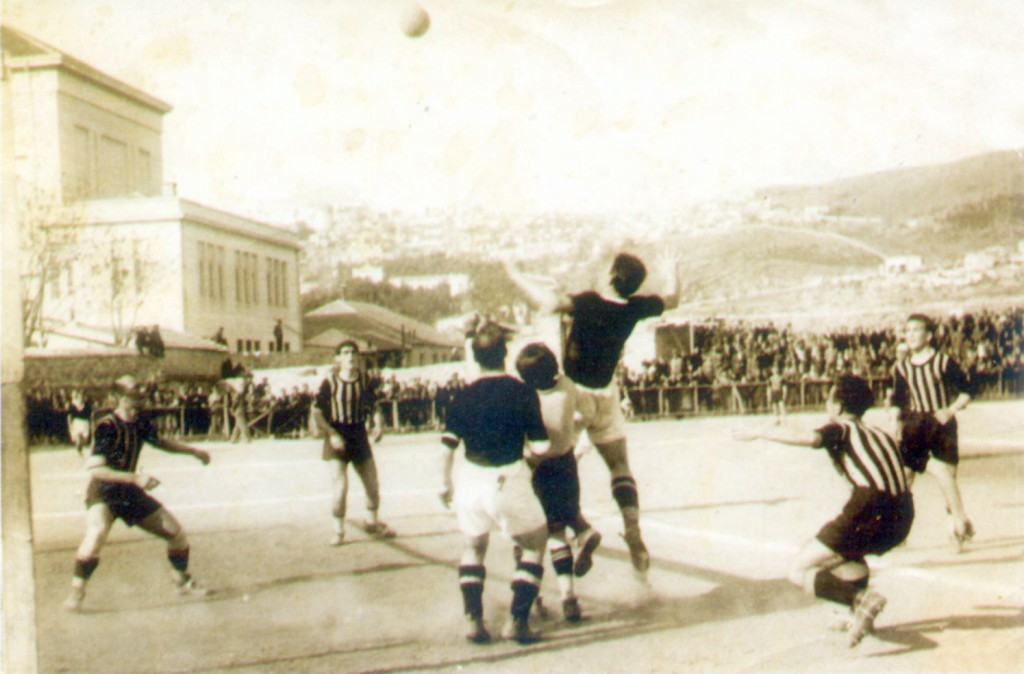
Snapshot from the old Syntrivani Stadium

The Aristotle University of Thessaloniki purchased a two-acre piece of land in the area of Syntrivani Stadium in order to construct new schools. PAOK had to relocate and a 7.5 acres area, owned by the Ministry of National Defence at Toumba district was chosen as the adequate location. The purchase cost was set at 1.5 million drachmas and was paid by PAOK administration in 20 six-month instalments of 75,000 drachmas each. On 7 February 1958, a committee of III Army Corps officers delivered the land to PAOK representatives.

There were still barracks on the premises, housing victims of the Greek Civil War and the 1953 Ionian earthquake. Relocating all these people cost the club 70,000 drachmas. The total cost of the stadium's construction amounted to 6 million drachmas, with just 1.1 million coming from the General Secretariat of Sports as subvention. In spring of 1958 construction work started, based on the plans of architect Minas Trempelas and civil engineer Antonis Triglianos. In an attempt to collect the necessary funds, the club issued the "Lottery for the construction of PAOK New Stadium" in April 1958 at a cost of 20 drachmas each. Since 1956, the administration was withholding 15% of the gate income in order to fund the construction of the new stadium. Many PAOK fans, apart from money, also contributed to construction by volunteering to work as builders. The construction of the stadium was completed at a record time of one year.

The inauguration event was scheduled for Sunday 6 September 1959 with a friendly encounter against AEK Athens (PAOK prevailed 1–0 with a goal by Kostas Kiourtzis). Prime minister Konstantinos Karamanlis's attendance was cancelled at the last minute. However, several ministers of his government were there for the occasion. As for the ball for the first kick-off, it fell at 17:30 off an airplane of Sedes Military Air Base. On inauguration day, 15,000 PAOK supporters packed Toumba Stadium, as that was the stadium's capacity back then. It would increase to 20,000 seats in the following months until it reached a 45,000-seat capacity in the mid-'70s through extensive expansion work.

The attendance record remains at 45,252 tickets and was registered on 19 December 1976 in the goalless draw against AEK Athens. In European football, the highest attendance was a 45,200 crowd in the 1–0 win against Barcelona (UEFA Cup, 16 September 1975).

=== The first Alpha Ethniki years ===
In 1959, Alpha Ethniki – the precursor of the current Super League – was set up as a national round-robin tournament and the 1959–60 championship was the first nationwide league competition. In the first decade of Greek Alpha Ethniki (1959–1969), PAOK had a top-half finish in every season except from the 10th-place finish in 1961. The best outcome came out in 1963 and 1967 with a 4th-place finish. Notable players of this period were Leandros Symeonidis, Giannis Giakoumis, Giannis Nikolaidis, Toulis Mouratidis, Pavlos Papadopoulos, Anestis Afentoulidis and Giorgos Makris.

=== Giorgos Koudas debut and start of the rivalry with Olympiacos ===
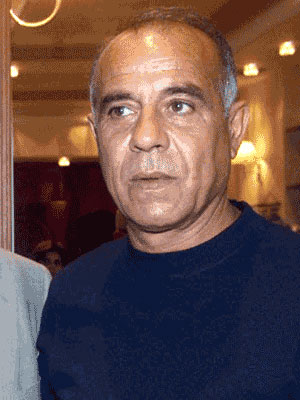
Giorgos Koudas, the most capped PAOK player with 607 games

Giorgos Koudas was born on 23 November 1946 in Thessaloniki. Aged 12, he signed his first contract with PAOK and made his first team debut on 21 December 1963 in a 1–0 loss to Ethnikos at Leoforos Alexandras Stadium. Koudas' talent immediately started to excel and in 1965–66 season he made 29 appearances and scored 13 goals. On 14 July 1966, PAOK fans were shocked by the news of Koudas' descent to Piraeus, accompanied by his father (who was enraged with PAOK administration for financial reasons) and determined to sign for Olympiacos, who tempted him by offering a much higher annual salary without going into a negotiation with his club. PAOK president Giorgos Pantelakis never gave his consent for the transfer to be completed and for the next two seasons, Koudas participated only in Olympiacos friendly games. Military junta's General Secretary of Sports Kostas Aslanidis suggested in 1968 that Koudas should return to PAOK for two years and then move to Olympiacos, but Pantelakis refused saying "I may go to Gyaros island (place of exile for leftist political dissidents), but Koudas would never go to Olympiacos". Eventually, Koudas returned to PAOK in the summer of 1968 and led the great team of the 1970s to glorious days. Fueled by this incident, Olympiacos–PAOK rivalry is considered nowadays the fiercest intercity football rivalry in Greece.

== 1970s ==
The 1970s decade was one of the best periods in the history of the football club. Scouting some of the best youth players in Northern Greece at the time and signing many of them to PAOK, president Giorgos Pantelakis built a strong team (including Stavros Sarafis, Christos Terzanidis, Kostas Iosifidis, Giannis Gounaris, Dimitris Paridis, Achilleas Aslanidis, Koulis Apostolidis, Filotas Pellios, Aristotelis Fountoukidis, Panagiotis Kermanidis, Angelos Anastasiadis, Neto Guerino and captained by Giorgos Koudas). The team won their first Championship (1976), two Cups (1972, 1974), a Greater Greece Cup (1973) and distinguished themselves in European competitions.

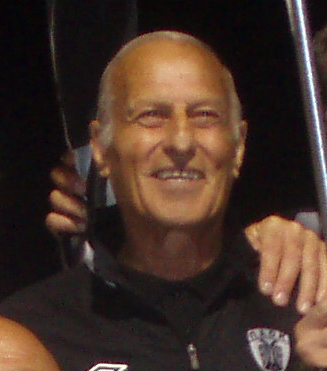
Christos Terzanidis, member of the great team of PAOK during the 1970s

PAOK participated in seven Greek Cup finals from 1970 to 1978. In the 1969–70 Greek Cup PAOK lost 1–0 to local rivals Aris in the final held at Kaftanzoglio Stadium and in the 1970–71 Greek Cup final they were defeated 3–1 by Olympiacos at Karaiskakis Stadium (home ground of Olympiacos).

The first domestic title PAOK won, was the Cup of 1971–72 season. PAOK reached the final for the third straight year, sixth in total and it would be the fifth time traveling to Athens for the trophy match. This time PAOK faced league champions Panathinaikos (runners-up in 1971 European Cup). The final was held at Karaiskakis Stadium on 5 July 1972. PAOK players had 10,000 fans on their side and they vowed that it was about time to return with the trophy to Thessaloniki. PAOK won the game 2–1 with Koudas scoring both goals. In the second half, a magnificent bicycle kick of Matzourakis found the net, but the goal was surprisingly disallowed by referee Michas. PAOK triumphed and their first Greek Cup title was widely celebrated by fans in Thessaloniki.

In 1972–73 season, PAOK came close to winning their first championship title playing exceptional football under the guidance of Les Shannon. On 25 February 1973 (matchday 20), PAOK, who were leading the league table by three points (point system 3–2–1) from rivals Olympiacos, suffered their first loss with 1–0 in a much disputed derby against Olympiacos at Karaiskakis Stadium. PAOK complained that referee Fakis was not taking the proper disciplinary action against Olympiacos players who committed violent fouls. Two players (Iosifidis and Aslanidis) were substituted in the first half after sustaining injuries. One week later, PAOK lost 1–0 to Fostiras in Athens and Olympiacos drew 0–0 away to Egaleo, results that left the two teams level on points. On 22 April 1973 (matchday 28), PAOK suffered a 3–5 shock defeat against Panachaiki at Toumba Stadium and Olympiacos who drew 1–1 away to Kavala, took the lead in the standings and with six wins in their remaining matches won the championship. At the end of the season, PAOK participated for fourth consecutive year in the Greek Cup final and lost 1–0 to Olympiacos at Karaiskakis Stadium (home ground of Olympiacos).

In 1973–74 season, PAOK reached the quarter-finals of 1973–74 UEFA Cup Winners' Cup where they were knocked out by Milan 5–2 on aggregate. PAOK had defeated Legia Warsaw 2–1 on aggregate and Lyon 7–3 on aggregate in the previous rounds. That season, PAOK reached the Greek Cup final for a fifth consecutive year. The final was held at Nikos Goumas Stadium, once again in Athens, on 16 June, and was the first to be decided by a penalty shoot-out. The game ended 2–2 and PAOK won 4–3 on penalties over Olympiacos with Koulis Apostolidis converting the last of the procedure.

=== 1975–76 Alpha Ethniki (first league title) ===

PAOK lineup in the 1975–76 season (Kermanidis was also a first-team regular)
Manager: (Hungary) Gyula Lóránt

In the 1975–76 PAOK FC season, with Gyula Lóránt at the helm, the team had two daily practices instead of one and physical condition of the players improved significantly. On 4 January 1976, PAOK won 4–0 away at Olympiacos (their biggest home defeat in their history). On 11 April, PAOK defeated Panionios 4–0 and topped the table for first time that season, level on points with AEK Athens, who lost 0–1 to Panathinaikos. On matchday 25, AEK were defeated 1–0 by Aris in Thessaloniki and PAOK, with a 3–0 away win over Panachaiki, were alone at the top of the league table. The league title would be decided in two consecutive high-profile encounters at Toumba Stadium. PAOK prevailed 3–1 over Olympiacos and 1–0 over AEK with Neto Guerino scoring the winner in the 89th minute, giving the Double-Headed Eagle of the North a four-point lead (point system 2–1–0). The league title was clinched on the following matchday, when AEK were held to a goalless draw at Panserraikos and PAOK defeated 3–1 Iraklis at Kaftanzoglio Stadium.

In the 1976–77 season, the team tried to defend the title and reached the last 16 of 1976–77 European Cup where they were knocked out by a far superior Dynamo Kyiv side. On 1 May 1977 (matchday 28), PAOK were leading the league table and lost 1–0 to AEK at Nikos Goumas Stadium with a controversial first-half goal that was scored from a direct free kick while goalkeeper Milinis was still setting up the wall. Referee Tsoukaladelis credited the goal to AEK despite the heavy protests from PAOK players and also sent off PAOK midfielder Damanakis in the first half for dangerous play. In the second half, a headed goal scored by Sarafis was wrongly ruled out for offside. PAOK fell from the top of the table. On 12 June (matchday 32), the team had a great chance against Panathinaikos at a packed Toumba Stadium to regain the lead (Panathinaikos were a point ahead). The game ended in a 0–0 stalemate, disappointing fans eager to win a back-to-back championship, while the team performance in the championship decider also did not meet expectations. On 22 June, PAOK lost 2–1 to Panathinaikos in the Greek Cup final held at Karaiskakis Stadium. President Pantelakis was furious with referee Platopoulos who sent off Gounaris in the 64th minute and ordered PAOK players to leave the awarding ceremony without receiving their medals.

In the 1977–78 season, PAOK finished runners-up in the league, with Kostas Orfanos finishing top scorer of the club in the league with 15 goals. The team's loss to AEK at the Nea Filadelfeia Stadium at the end of the season sealed the title to the latter. The team also mounted a strong Cup run, beating Aris in the semi–finals on extra time, but lost 2–0 to AEK in the Cup final held at Karaiskakis Stadium.

Compared to the previous three seasons, the 1978–79 season was lackluster, with a 4th place and early eliminations in the domestic Cup and the Cup Winners' Cup to Olympiacos and Servette, respectively, under Polish manager Egon Piechaczek. However, the team mounted a near perfect home run in all competitions, having only wins, save for a draw against Iraklis in October. The team was also affected by the deadly June earthquake that plagued the city of Thessaloniki, with Toumba Stadium being unusable for a period of time.

Prior to the 1979–80 season, football in Greece became fully professional and PAOK would become entangled in ownership controversies involving the club's ultras Gate 4 that would go on via various means for over two decades.

By March 1980, five teams were battling for the championship title. On 9 March 1980 (matchday 24), PAOK were leading the table and lost 0–2 to rivals Panathinaikos at Toumba Stadium. This was the first home defeat after a 62-game unbeaten run (52 wins/10 draws). Kostikos scored two goals in the first half, but both of them were disallowed by referee Litsas. In the second half, Kostikos was brought down in the area by Kovis, but Litsas denied the penalty and sent off PAOK defender Pellios who was protesting. In the final minutes of the game, PAOK had a chance to score from the penalty spot, but the fans shouted to Orfanos to send the ball wide. Orfanos made a really weak side foot-kick which was easily saved by goalkeeper Konstantinou. After the final whistle, all hell broke loose in and around the stadium with 23 police officers and 20 fans sustaining injuries.

In April, Piecharczek was sacked after a series of poor results and was replaced by Gyula Lóránt, who returned after his successful title charge four years earlier, but couldn't pull the team above an ultimately disappointing 5th place in the league table. Adding to the club's short term troubles, Toumba's Gate 8 collapsed in February due to the 1978 earthquake, which rendered the stadium unusable until early into the following season, with the team playing at Iraklis' Kaftanzoglio Stadium for that time period.

== 1980s: Professionalism, league title and financial troubles ==
On 31 May 1981, PAOK manager Gyula Lóránt had a heart attack in the 16th minute of the match against Olympiacos at Toumba Stadium when Koudas headed the ball wide from close range. Doctors attempted to resuscitate him, but he died before the ambulance arrived. At half-time PAOK players were told that he had been taken to hospital and were only told about his death after the game. PAOK eventually won the derby 1–0 with the goal by substitute Vassilis Vasilakos (who had been sitting next to Lóránt when he collapsed). PAOK players wanted to dedicate a Greek Cup title to his memory, but the team lost 3–1 to Olympiacos in the Greek Cup final held at Nikos Goumas Stadium on 21 June.

In the 1981–82 season PAOK contested a domestic double, but ultimately fell short of both trophies, owing to a mediocre form in the last fixtures of the league, which condemned the team to a 3rd-place position, and a tense semi–final at Leoforos Alexandras against Panathinaikos, where the team conceded a late goal from Grigoris Charalampidis, resulting in elimination. Moreover, the team engaged in a memorable tie against West German powerhouse Eintracht Frankfurt in that year's Cup Winners' Cup. After a 2–0 loss at the Waldstadion, anticipation for the return tie was massive. In front of a crowd of 35,000 (unofficial estimates range much higher), the team had a dominant display and managed to equal the 2–0 deficit, but failed to score the third goal prior to the penalty shootout. After up-and-coming Christos Dimopoulos's penalty was saved, Bruno Pezzey netted the winning penalty kick.

On 29 June 1983, PAOK participated once again in the Greek Cup final which was held for first time at the newly built Olympic Stadium of Athens. Captained for last time in a Greek Cup final by Koudas, the team lost 2–0 to AEK despite their superiority over the opponents that day. A first-half goal by Giorgos Kostikos was ruled out for offside.

PAOK also made a memorable appearance against German giants Bayern Munich in the second round of the 1983–84 UEFA Cup, where they were knocked out on penalties (9–8) after two goalless draws. Bayern's first penalty kick, taken by Klaus Augenthaler, was saved twice by PAOK goalkeeper Mladen Furtula, but the English referee Arthur Robinson ordered the penalty to be retaken both times. Augenthaler admitted in a 2018 interview that the referee favored Bayern and that he felt uncomfortable when he was asked to take the penalty for a third time. At the end of the season, Koudas and Furtula retired from professional football.

=== 1984–85 Alpha Ethniki (second league title) ===

Players with most apps in the 1984–85 season (Kostikos: 23 apps / 10 goals, Damanakis & Alexandridis: 24 apps each)
Manager: (Austria) Walter Skocik

PAOK's second championship came in 1984–85 season, under Austrian manager Walter Skocik. Notable team figures included Georgios Skartados, Nikos Alavantas, Thomas Singas, Rade Paprica and the attacking duo of Giorgos Kostikos and Christos Dimopoulos. It was the last season at the club for Ioannis Damanakis and captain Kostas Iosifidis, who ended his football career.

On 20 January 1985 (matchday 15), PAOK gained a five-point lead (point system 2–1–0) with a 1–0 away win over Panathinaikos at the Olympic Stadium of Athens. The crucial goal was scored by Paprica in the 80th minute with a diving header. On 9 June, PAOK clinched the league title with a goalless draw at Nea Smyrni Stadium against Panionios, as Panathinaikos were held to a 2–2 draw by bottom of the table Pierikos. On 22 June, 10-man (Vasilakos was sent-off early in the first half) PAOK lost 4–1 to Larissa in the Greek Cup final held at the Olympic Stadium of Athens and wasted the opportunity to win a first domestic Double. PAOK's top goalscorer that season, Christos Dimopoulos, did not participate as he left the team at Athens airport when they arrived from Thessaloniki for the game. He went to the headquarters of Motor Oil (company of Panathinaikos president Vardinogiannis) in order to seal his transfer to Panathinaikos as his five-year contract with PAOK was expiring.

In the 1987–88 season, PAOK were fighting for the title (along with AEL and AEK Athens) up to matchday 23, when they suffered a surprising 0–2 home defeat to Iraklis. Earlier that season, on 6 December 1987, PAOK made a record 6–1 win over rivals Olympiacos at Serres Municipal Stadium (biggest defeat of Olympiacos in Greek Alpha Ethniki/Superleague history). PAOK finished third in the league and qualified for 1988–89 UEFA Cup where they faced Napoli of Maradona, Careca and Alemão. The team fought vigorously, but lost 2–1 on aggregate. Maradona, when asked on RAI TV, moments after the final whistle of the second leg at Toumba Stadium, if he had ever played in such an atmosphere, said "I have played a lot of games, but I have never seen anything like this. We couldn't find any rhythm and I believe that it was difficult for the opponents too. It was a weird encounter".

== The Thomas Voulinos era (1989–1996) ==
In the 1989–90 season, with Magdy Tolba shining and youngster Giorgos Toursounidis rising, the team managed to reach the half-way stage of the competition topping the table (winter champions), but good form deteriorated and PAOK finished third.

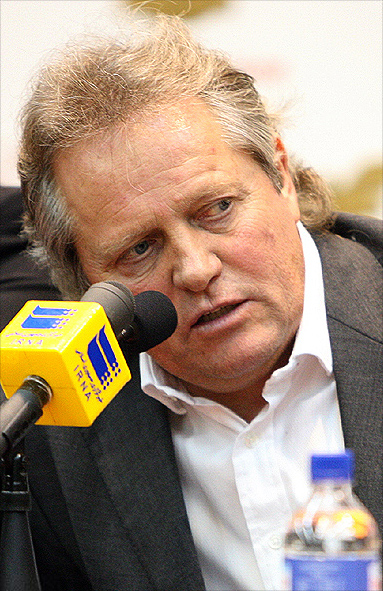
Arie Haan, PAOK manager during the 1994–95 season

The 1990–91 season started with PAOK facing Sevilla in the first round of the UEFA Cup and they were knocked out on penalties after two goalless draws. On 23 September 1990 (matchday 2), president Thomas Voulinos stormed the field in the 77th minute of the derby against Panathinaikos at the Olympic Stadium of Athens. Voulinos was furious with referee Karamanis and despite the fact that the scoreline was 3–0 and the winner was already determined, he ordered PAOK players to leave the pitch. After the game which was eventually abandoned, he said "We felt like sheep that were heading to be butchered and that was unacceptable". PAOK were later penalised with a three-point deduction and had to play five home games behind closed doors. The two teams met again in the Greek Cup semi-finals and in the 57th minute of the second leg at Toumba Stadium, Voulinos once again entered the pitch angry at decisions by referee Vasilakis. Panathinaikos won 2–1 on aggregate. In 1991–92 season, under Croatian manager Miroslav Blažević, PAOK qualified against the then strong KV Mechelen (winners in 1988, semi-finalists in 1989 Cup Winners' Cup / quarter-finalists in 1990 European Cup) in the first round of 1991–92 UEFA Cup, 2–1 on aggregate. Stefanos Borbokis scored the winner in the 85th minute of the second leg at Achter de Kazerne Stadium. Blazevic was replaced by Gounaris later and the team lost in the two-legged Greek Cup final to Olympiacos, 3–1 on aggregate. On 24 May 1992 (matchday 32), PAOK lost 1–2 to Olympiacos at Toumba Stadium and suffered their first home defeat against rivals Olympiacos after a 24-game unbeaten run (21 wins/3 draws – 21 league matches/3 cup matches – goals 52/12) which lasted for 23 years. It is rumoured that after this shock defeat, the renowned PAOK ultras leader Thomas Mavromichalis (nicknamed Makis Manavis, i.e., greengrocer due to his profession – PAOK ultras refer to him as «The General») decided to never set foot again at Toumba Stadium.

On 1 October 1992, the PAOK v. Paris Saint–Germain UEFA Cup match was abandoned due to crowd violence. PAOK were punished with a two-year ban from all European competitions by UEFA's disciplinary committee. The sentence was later reduced to one year. In the 1994–95 season, under Dutch manager Arie Haan, PAOK finished third in the league and Apollon Athens took their place in the next season's UEFA Cup.

The 1995–96 season was the worst in the club's history. PAOK were seriously threatened with a possible relegation for first time in their history. The team managed to avoid relegation a few weeks before the end of the season, finishing in a record low 14th place, with various demonstrations and riots against Voulinos throughout the season, including an arson attack on his house after a 1–3 loss to AEK in November 1995. However, the team mounted a consistent Cup run, being eliminated in the semi–finals by Apollon Athens.

== The Giorgos Batatoudis era (1996–2003) ==
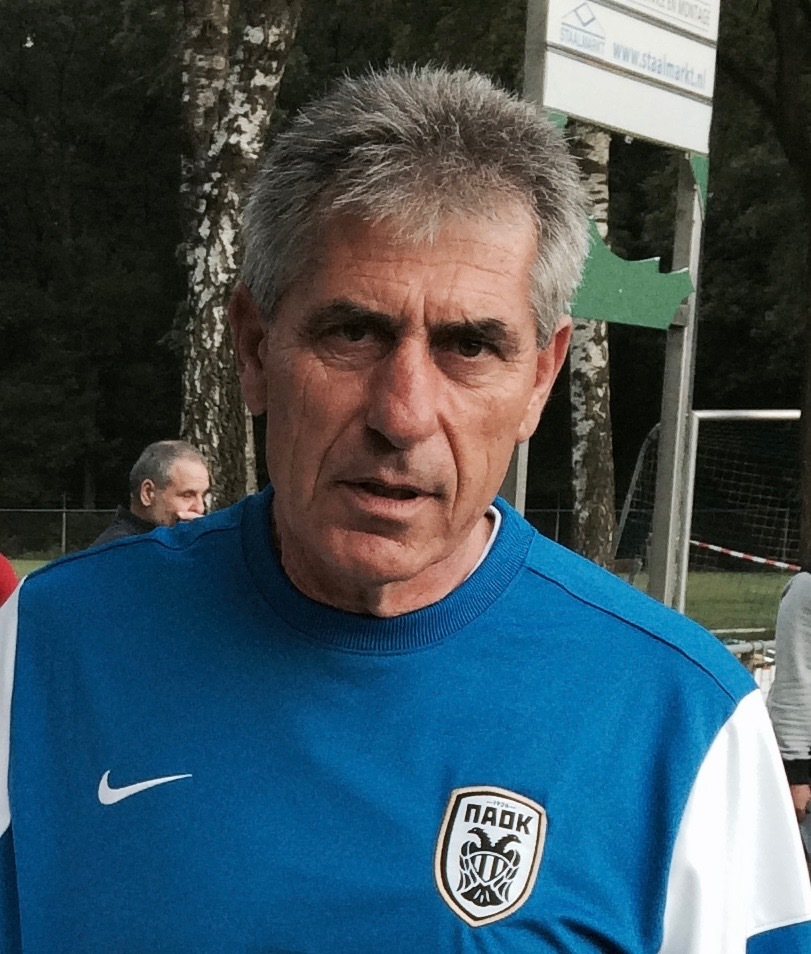
Angelos Anastasiadis, 2003 Greek Cup winner as a coach

PAOK starting line-up in the 2001 Greek Cup final
Olympiacos 2–4 PAOK
Manager: (Bosnia and Herzegovina) Dušan Bajević

PAOK starting line-up in the 2003 Greek Cup final
PAOK 1–0 Aris
Manager: (Greece) Angelos Anastasiadis

In 1996, Thomas Voulinos handed over a debt-free PAOK to Giorgos Batatoudis. Numerous transfers of quality players such as Zisis Vryzas, Spyros Marangos, free kick specialist Kostas Frantzeskos, Percy Olivares and Joe Nagbe took place under the new administration. In May 1997, after a five-year absence from European competitions, PAOK qualified for the UEFA Cup under coach Angelos Anastasiadis. The club's reappearance at European level was marked by a victory and qualification over Arsenal, 2–1 on aggregate. Arsenal went on to win a domestic Double that season. Remembering the first leg encounter, captain Tony Adams and goalkeeper David Seaman spoke very highly of the atmosphere created by PAOK fans at Toumba Stadium.

On 9 February 1998, PAOK player Panagiotis Katsouris, aged 21, was returning from an amateur 5x5 match, when his car skidded off the road due to excessive speed, hitting the barriers at the Thermi interchange outside Thessaloniki. His death was verified in AHEPA Hospital shortly afterwards. He was buried on 12 February in the Anastaseos Cemetery in Thessaloniki. A bust was erected in his memory at Toumba Stadium and memorial services are held each year near the accident scene. In February 2009, PAOK announced that a football tournament, bearing his name, would be held annually. Katsouris' No 17 jersey was permanently retired by the club in his memory.

Early on 4 October 1999, in a bus accident in the Vale of Tempe, Thessaly, six PAOK fans were killed (Kyriakos Lazaridis, Christina Tziova, Anastasios Themelis, Charalampos Zapounidis, Georgios Ganatsios, Dimitris Andreadakis). The bus was heading back to Thessaloniki after a 1–1 draw against Panathinaikos at the Olympic Stadium of Athens. A ceremony in commemoration of the incident has taken place every year since.

In January 2000, PAOK appointed Dušan Bajević as their new manager, who restructured the squad by bringing players like Borbokis, Engomitis, Okkas, Udeze and others. Under his guidance, PAOK won the Greek Cup beating Olympiacos 4–2 in the final held at Nikos Goumas Stadium on 12 May 2001. It was PAOK's first domestic trophy in 16 years with the previous one being the 1985 league title. Bajević departed in the summer of 2002 and he was succeeded by Angelos Anastasiadis who returned for a third stint as PAOK manager.

On 17 May 2003, PAOK defeated local rivals Aris 1–0 in the final held at Toumba Stadium with an excellent goal scored by Georgios Georgiadis and earned their fourth Greek Cup title. Dimitris Markos provided the assist. PAOK manager Angelos Anastasiadis became the first in the club's history to win the Cup both as a player (in 1974) and manager.

During the seven-year period of Batatoudis' ownership, PAOK's debts rose to about €10 million.

== The Giannis Goumenos era: troubled times (2003–2006) ==
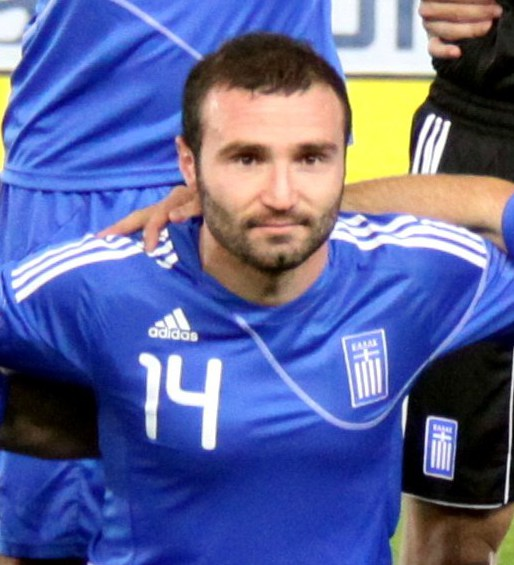
Dimitris Salpingidis, a divisive figure in the club's history due to his controversial transfer to rivals Panathinaikos

The 2003–04 season was an unexpected success. Batatoudis was no longer the major shareholder and first-team regulars like Kafes, Georgiadis and Okkas departed due to financial issues. Under coach Anastasiadis, PAOK managed to finish third in the league and reached the third qualifying round of 2004–05 UEFA Champions League, where they faced Maccabi Tel Aviv. The first leg at Toumba Stadium ended 1–2, but it was later awarded 0–3 against PAOK for fielding a suspended player - Liasos Louka, a Cypriot player still serving a two-match ban in UEFA competitions (for his sending-off in a UEFA Intertoto Cup tie while playing for Nea Salamis on 8 July 2000). Eventually, the team failed to qualify for the group stage.

Rolf Fringer succeeded Angelos Anastasiadis in September 2004, but after a few games, he was replaced by Nikos Karageorgiou, who led the club to a fifth-place finish in May 2005 and a subsequent 2005–06 UEFA Cup qualification.

In late May 2006, the club's poor financial position started to emerge; players declared they had been unpaid for months. A shocking decision by UEFA to ban the club from the upcoming UEFA Cup brought the club close to dissolution. The organized supporters' groups launched an all-out war against president Giannis Goumenos during the summer of 2006, even occupying the club's offices in Toumba stadium for a handful of days. The situation was worsening for Goumenos after various negotiations with possible investors failed, constant allegations of embezzlement emerged, and especially after his decision to sell star player Dimitris Salpingidis to Panathinaikos.

On 13 November 2006, Goumenos resigned from PAOK presidency leaving huge debts behind (during the three-year period of Goumenos' ownership, the club's debts rose from about €10 million to around €30 million → €10 million were the primary debt obligations plus €20 million from additional taxes, fines and surcharges) and few weeks later, Nikos Vezyrtzis–Apostolos Oikonomidis duo (former PAOK BC presidents) assumed temporary management of the club.

== Zagorakis – Vryzas management with massive fans' support (2007–2012) ==
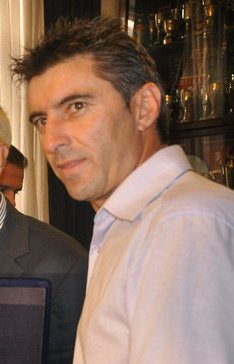
Theodoros Zagorakis, the iconic captain and former president of PAOK FC

In June 2007, former player and captain Theodoros Zagorakis assumed the presidency of the club, replacing the Nikos Vezyrtzis and Apostolos Oikonomidis administration and thus ushered a new era, in an effort to bring the club back to successes.

In 2007–08 PAOK FC season, the early replacement of Georgios Paraschos by the well-known established manager Fernando Santos did little to prevent a ninth-place finish in the league. On 6 January 2008, Zisis Vryzas ended his football career coming on as a substitute in the game against AEL and immediately started his tenure as PAOK sports director.

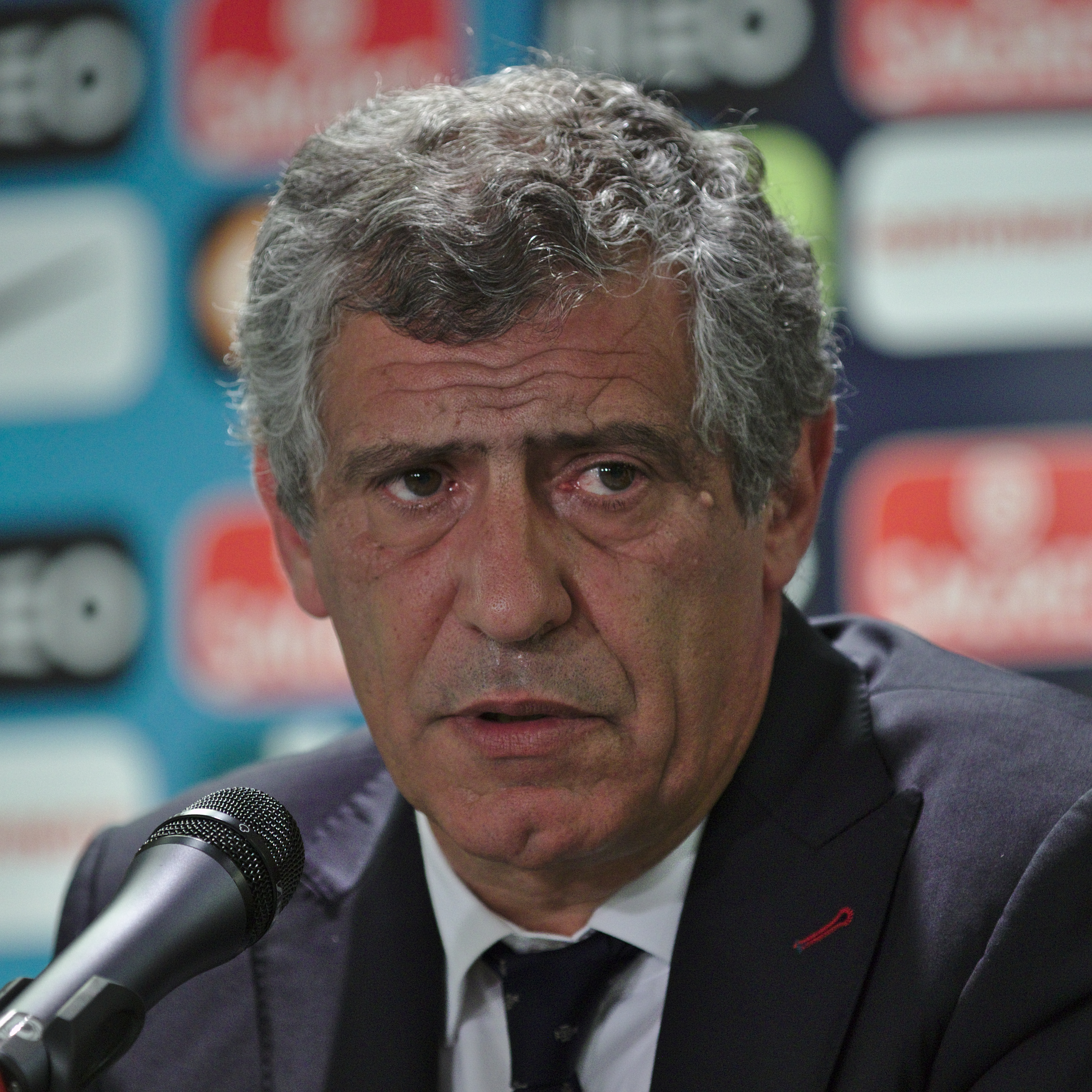
Fernando Santos, PAOK manager during the 2007–2010 period

The club's finances gradually improved thanks to new sponsorship deals and the continuing support from fans (the number of season tickets was vastly increased). In June 2008, Theodoros Zagorakis announced the club's intention of building a new PAOK FC Sport Center in the Nea Mesimvria urban area of Thessaloniki, owned by the club. The administration had already acquired land from the municipality of Agios Athanasios and the project would be executed by former president Vasilis Sergiannidis' construction company.

In the summer of 2008, the club brought in promising winger Vieirinha and widely known internationals Pablo Contreras, Zlatan Muslimović and Pablo García. In the winter transfer window that followed, Olivier Sorlin and Lino joined the team. The end of the 2008–09 season found PAOK in second place, eight points behind champions Olympiacos. However, the team lost in the Super League playoffs (pos. 2–5) to Panathinaikos and finished in fourth place.

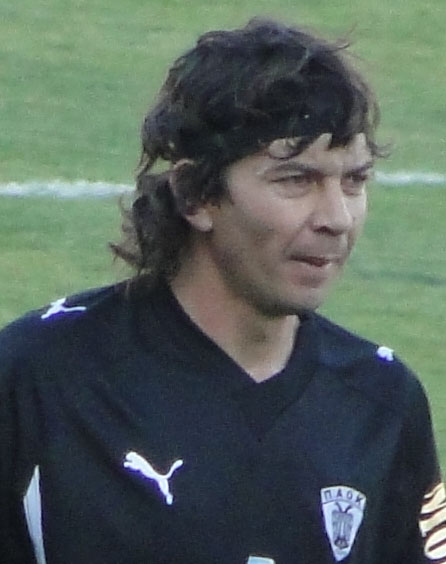
Fans' favorite Pablo García in 2010

In the 2009–10 PAOK FC season, PAOK fought for the title up to matchday 26 (Panathinaikos were two points ahead), when they lost 2–0 against local rivals Aris at Kleanthis Vikelidis Stadium. The club complained about referee Spathas; after the final whistle, Zagorakis went to the dressing room and apologized to PAOK players for not being able to protect them against poor refereeing. PAOK went on to win the league playoffs (pos. 2–5) and qualified for 2010–11 UEFA Champions League third qualifying round, but the success was swiftly followed by Fernando Santos' announcement of his decision to depart, having concluded his three-year contract as head coach. It was eventually decided in mid-June that Mario Beretta would be his successor.

Beretta was quickly replaced by Pavlos Dermitzakis and became the shortest-serving PAOK coach ever, sitting on the bench for just 38 days. With Dermitzakis at the helm, PAOK faced Ajax and was ultimately eliminated on the away goals rule, managing a 1–1 draw in Amsterdam and a thrilling 3–3 draw in Thessaloniki. Entering the UEFA Europa League playoff round, PAOK were drawn against Fenerbahçe, also eliminated from the Champions League third qualifying round. PAOK won the home game 1–0 in Thessaloniki, then secured a 1–1 draw after extra time in Constantinople. Dermitzakis was removed after a 1–0 loss to Panathinaikos on 17 October. His assistant, Makis Chavos, replaced him as caretaker manager and PAOK reached the knockout phase of the Europa League, losing 2–1 on aggregate to CSKA Moscow. In the league, PAOK finished third and qualified for the 2011–12 UEFA Europa League.

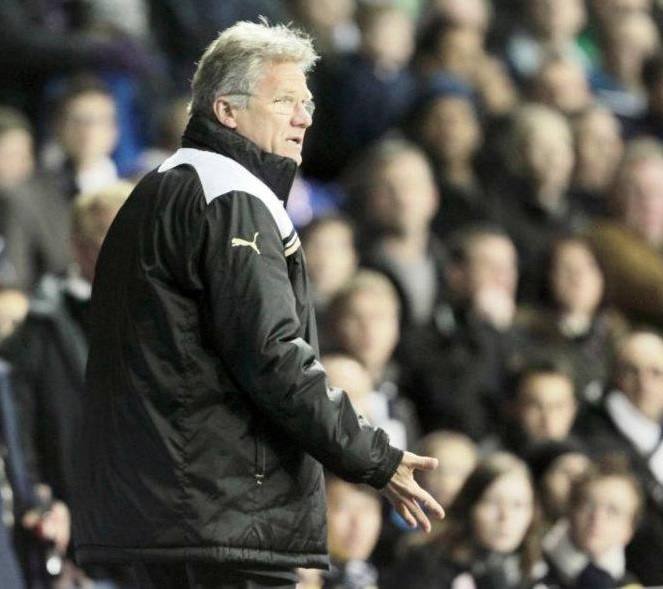
Tottenham 1–2 PAOK, László Bölöni at White Hart Lane

PAOK board appointed Romanian László Bölöni as the club's new head coach for the following season. The team qualified from the UEFA Europa League playoff round and entered the group stage. On 30 November 2011, PAOK achieved a historic 2–1 victory over Tottenham Hotspur at White Hart Lane. With this victory, the club qualified for the knockout phase for a second consecutive year. On 26 January 2012, Theodoros Zagorakis resigned from the club's presidency and was replaced by Zisis Vryzas.

== The Ivan Savvidis era (2012–present) ==
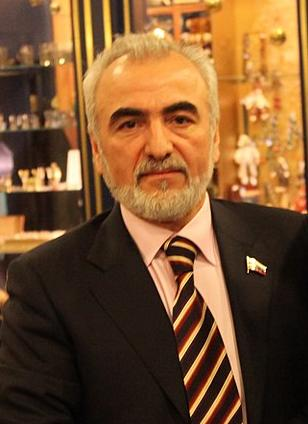
Ivan Savvidis in 2010

On 10 August 2012, Ivan Savvidis acquired PAOK ownership by depositing a fee of €9,951,000 and thus becoming the major shareholder of the club.

In 2012–13 PAOK FC season, under manager Georgios Donis, PAOK finished 2nd during the regular period, qualifying for the Super League Greece playoffs (pos. 2–5). After a Greek Cup semi-final loss to Asteras Tripolis, Donis was replaced by technical director and former player Georgios Georgiadis, who was appointed as caretaker manager. PAOK managed to win qualification for the third qualifying round of the 2013–14 UEFA Champions League through the playoffs after a last game win against PAS Giannina.

In June 2013, PAOK appointed Huub Stevens as their new coach, but he was dismissed in March 2014 after achieving poor results. Once again, Georgiadis was appointed as caretaker manager and the team managed to reach the 2013–14 Greek Cup final, but lost 4–1 to Panathinaikos at the Olympic Stadium of Athens.

In March 2015, Law N° 4321/2015 on regulations for kickstarting the economy was adopted by the Greek government and stated that a total repayment of a company's primary debt obligations would lead to the deletion of all additional taxes, fines and surcharges. On 12 May 2015, PAOK owner Ivan Savvidis paid the total amount of the club's debts towards Greek public authorities, a fee of €10,886,811. On 27 May, PAOK hired Frank Arnesen as their new sports director. On 18 June, Igor Tudor was hired as the new manager of the club, signing a three-year contract. On 2 September, PAOK announced the signing of Dimitar Berbatov on a one-year deal. Playing a 3–5–2 formation, the team progressed through three qualifying rounds to reach the UEFA Europa League group stage and on 10 December, PAOK made a surprising 1–0 away win over Borussia Dortmund at Signal Iduna Park. Tudor was replaced in March 2016 by youth-team coach Vladimir Ivić and the team won the Super League play-offs (pos. 2–5) and qualified for the 2016–17 UEFA Champions League third qualifying round.

PAOK won the 2016–17 Greek Cup beating AEK Athens by 2–1 in the final held at Panthessaliko Stadium with a controversial goal scored by Pedro Henrique in the 81st minute. Linesman Kalfoglou failed to indicate that the scorer was in an offside position. In the same phase of play, moments before Leovac made the cross to Henrique, Crespo was brought down in the area by Simoes, but PAOK were denied a penalty by referee Kominis. The final was marred by crowd violence before the kick-off. In the Super League play-offs (pos. 2–5) that followed, a game against Panathinaikos at Leoforos Alexandras Stadium was abandoned (scoreline 1–0 at the time) when Ivić was struck on his head by a beer can that was thrown from the crowd. The Serbian coach was taken to a public hospital and the match was interrupted by referee Kominis in the 54th minute. Panathinaikos representatives claimed that Ivić exaggerated the impact of the injury and could continue. The game was awarded 0–3 to PAOK by court decision. AEK went on to win the playoffs and PAOK finished 4th. After the end of the season, Ivić did not renew his contract and the club appointed Aleksandar Stanojević whose tenure as PAOK manager did not last long. On 11 August 2017, he was replaced by Răzvan Lucescu.

=== 2017–18 eventful season ===
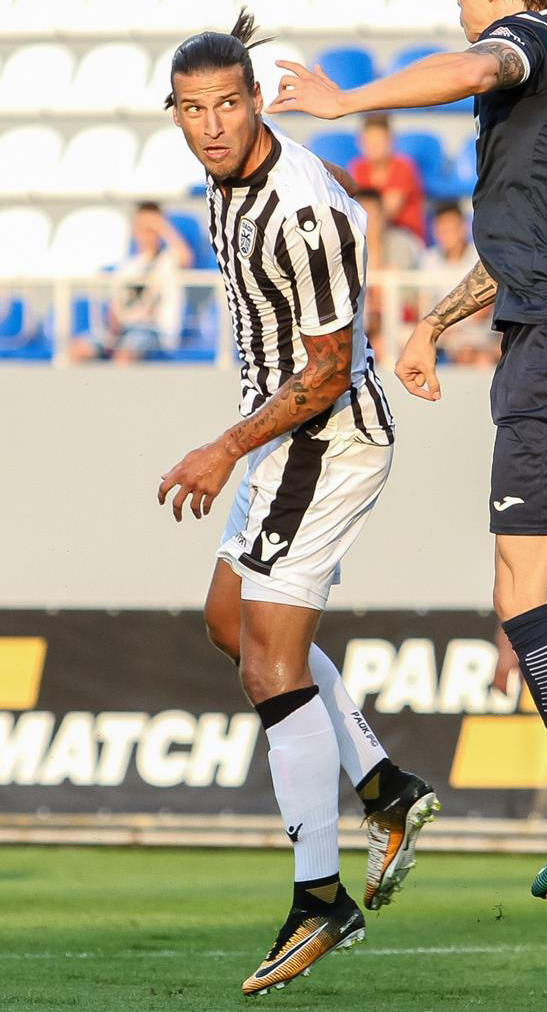
Aleksandar Prijović, top goalscorer in the 2017–2018 season

On 25 February 2018 (and while PAOK were leading the league table being 2pts ahead of AEK), PAOK–Olympiacos derby was suspended before kick-off when Olympiacos manager Óscar García Junyent was hit by an object thrown from the crowd (reportedly by an unfolding cash register paper roll). Óscar García received medical attention before being taken to a private general hospital (Interbalkan Medical Center). The private clinic where García was taken issued a statement about five hours after the coach was admitted, saying that due to his medical condition (sensitivity in the jaw, neck pain, dizziness and nausea) García had to stay at the hospital overnight and PAOK vs Olympiacos game never started. Olympiacos communications chief Karapapas stated that he expected a huge apology from PAOK for the incident and that their rivals should become more civilized if they want to develop into a big club. He also claimed that the object that fell onto García was a sealed cash register paper roll, which can be as heavy as a stone and when thrown from a certain height and distance with a certain force can be a very powerful blow. PAOK representatives claimed that the whole incident was a certain tactic from Olympiacos, which eventually did not work out because there was no injury sustained. Medical report of the official doctor of the match, approved by the Greek Football Federation (EPO), stated that García was not seriously injured and could return on the bench, but Olympiacos questioned doctor's credibility because he was a PAOK employee, working in PAOK youth academy. Referee Aretopoulos (who had many controversial moments in his career) submitted two match reports to describe why the game was abandoned (an initial report at Toumba Stadium and a supplementary report few days later that was demanded by first-instance court judge). Olympiacos were later awarded a 0–3 win by court decision.

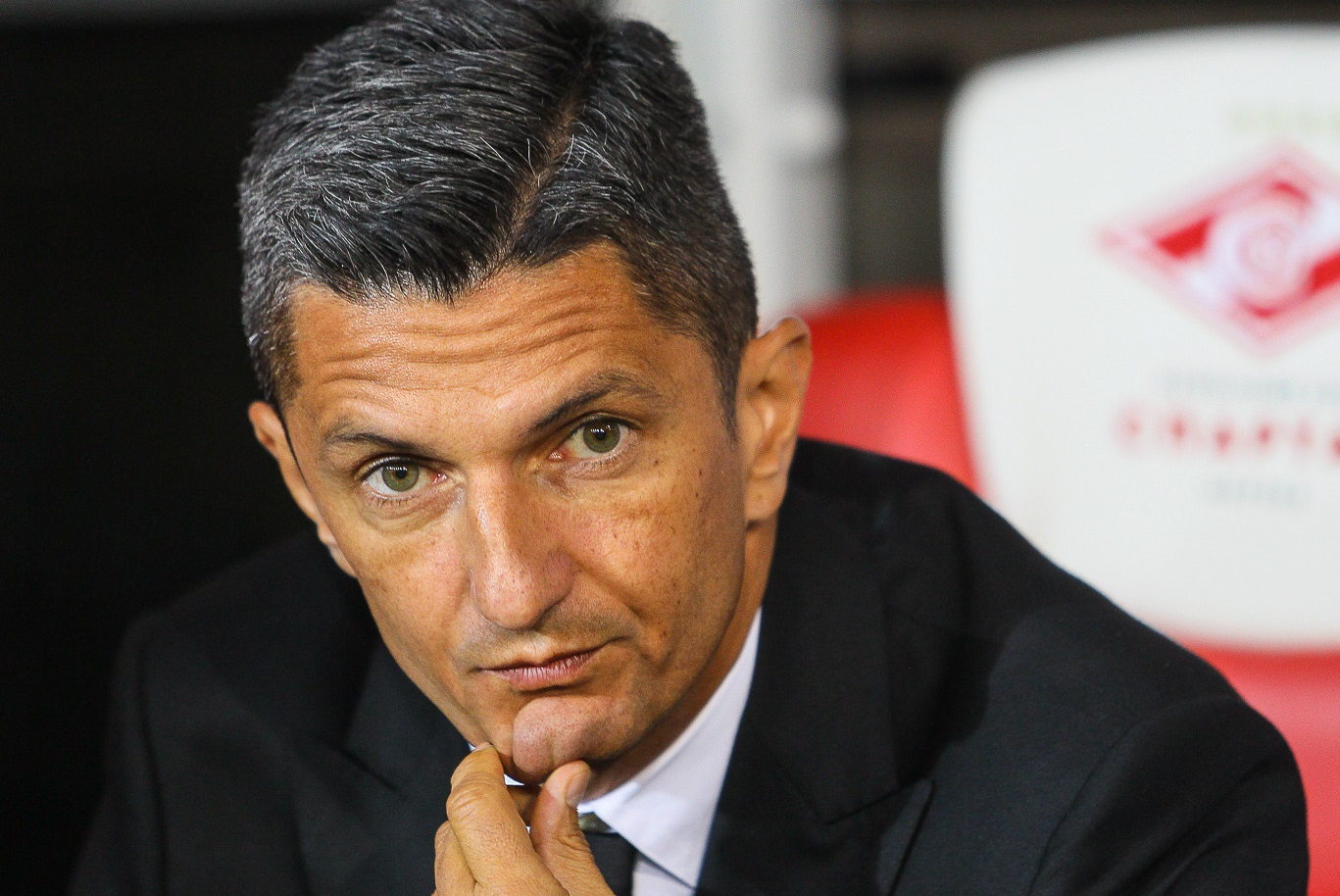
Răzvan Lucescu, most successful PAOK manager

On 11 March 2018, during a championship decider derby against AEK (timeline of events before the game: 24 Feb: PAOK 52pts/AEK 50pts, 25 Feb: PAOK–Olympiacos suspended before kick-off, 26 Feb: Atromitos–AEK 1–1 and PAOK 52pts/AEK 51pts, 4 Mar: Asteras Tripolis–PAOK 3–2, AEK–Panionios 1–0 and AEK 54pts/PAOK 52pts, 5 Mar: first-instance court sentence: PAOK deducted 3pts, game awarded 0–3 to Olympiacos, 2 home games behind closed doors and AEK 54pts/PAOK 49pts, 10 Mar: court of appeal sentence: 3pts returned to PAOK, game awarded 0–3 to Olympiacos, closed doors penalty suspended and AEK 54pts/PAOK 52pts), the president of the team, Ivan Savvidis, stormed onto the pitch when referee Georgios Kominis disallowed a 90th-minute goal scored by Fernando Varela with a header. The goal was initially credited to PAOK by both the referee who pointed the center spot and the linesman who never raised his flag and ran towards the center. About 10–15 seconds later and while PAOK players were celebrating, linesman Pontikis was approached by AEK players who were protesting and approximately 3 minutes after the goal was scored, they altered their decision. The goal was ruled out for offside (according to referee Kominis, Maurício influenced play). Savvidis entered the pitch with few members of his personal guard and Ľuboš Micheľ (former UEFA Elite referee). At first, he ordered his team to leave the pitch, but his request was denied by PAOK captain Vieirinha. Afterwards they went close to the referee, where Micheľ expressed his complaints about the decision. Leaving the pitch 1 minute after his entry, a tension was built between Savvidis and members of AEK bench and moments later Savvidis took off his jacket and a gun appeared attached to his belt. The referee suspended the game and sent the two teams to the dressing rooms. Savvidis tried to enter into the referees' dressing room, but he was denied entrance by security and few minutes later he left the stadium. Kominis' intention was the game to be continued after 1 hour (and blew his whistle outside the dressing rooms calling the two teams), but AEK general manager Vasilis Dimitriadis approached him and claimed (as can be heard in audio) that the players of AEK were terrified from the incident and could not continue as he felt that their safety was at risk. PAOK vice-president Chrisostomos Gagatsis is heard trying to persuade Dimitriadis to order AEK players to return on the pitch. Soon after, the game was abandoned.

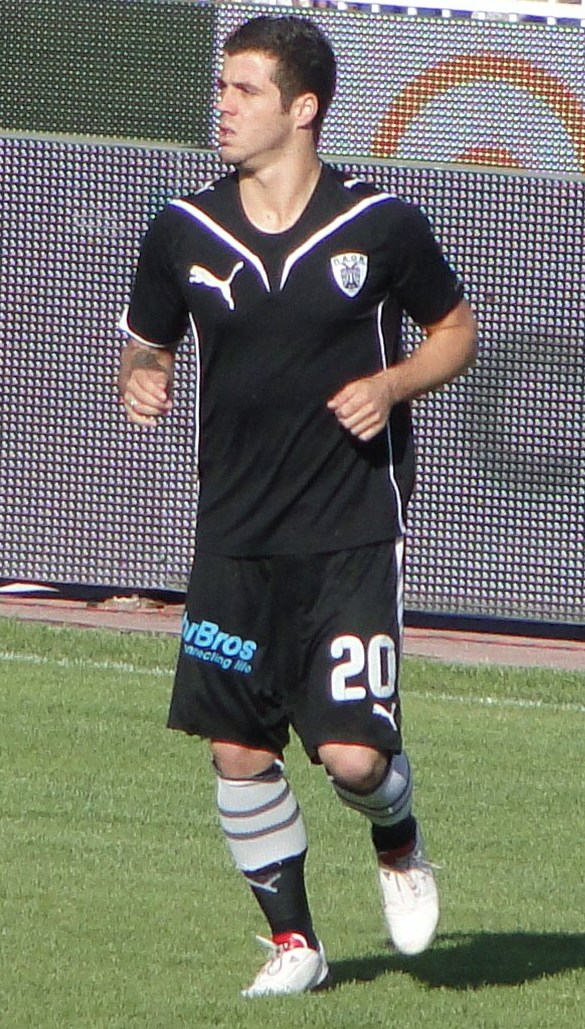
Vieirinha, PAOK most decorated player

The incident caused the league to be suspended by the Greek government. AEK manager Manolo Jiménez giving his side of the story, confirmed that Kominis wanted the game to be concluded, but AEK president told them not to play. He also said about a year later, that AEK players and himself realized that Savvidis was actually carrying a gun on his belt when they received photos on their cellphones and not while they were on the pitch. AEK midfielder Panagiotis Kone in an interview after the game also confirmed that Kominis told them to go out and play for the remaining 5 minutes, but he did not inform AEK players as to whether he would award or overturn PAOK goal when asked in the dressing rooms. He replied that they would be informed outside on the pitch. Of course, both Jiménez and Kone condemned Savvidis' actions and held him responsible for the interruption. PAOK goalkeeper Alexandros Paschalakis stated that it was clearly a legitimate goal scored by Varela, because Maurício was behind the goalkeeper and did not influence play. He also said that Savvidis' invasion of the pitch wasn't proper. On his official match report, referee Kominis wrote down that when the match was interrupted the scoreline was 1–0 and that he decided to award the goal. Kominis received a summons to appear at the court hearing, but he sent a letter instead, explaining that he could not show up for personal reasons. He also received a legal document with 3 questions from first-instance court judge and gave a definite answer in one of them and a vague response in the other two. Ivan Savvidis apologised for his behaviour two days after the game and he was later banned from all football stadiums for three years. PAOK were sentenced with a 3pt deduction (and 2pts from next season's championship) and AEK Athens were awarded a 0–3 win by court decision. The 6-point swing was a major blow to PAOK's title hopes and the club was unable to secure the title as AEK were crowned champions with three match-days to go.

The club still managed to end their season on a high note by winning their second consecutive Greek Cup beating AEK Athens 2–0 in the final held at the Olympic Stadium of Athens (AEK home ground at the time), with the match refereed after many years in Greece by a foreign referee (David Fernández Borbalán). During the post-game press conference, manager Lucescu and captain Vieirinha (final MVP) both stated that 2018 championship title was stolen from PAOK.

=== 2018–19 unbeaten Champions and first Domestic Double ===
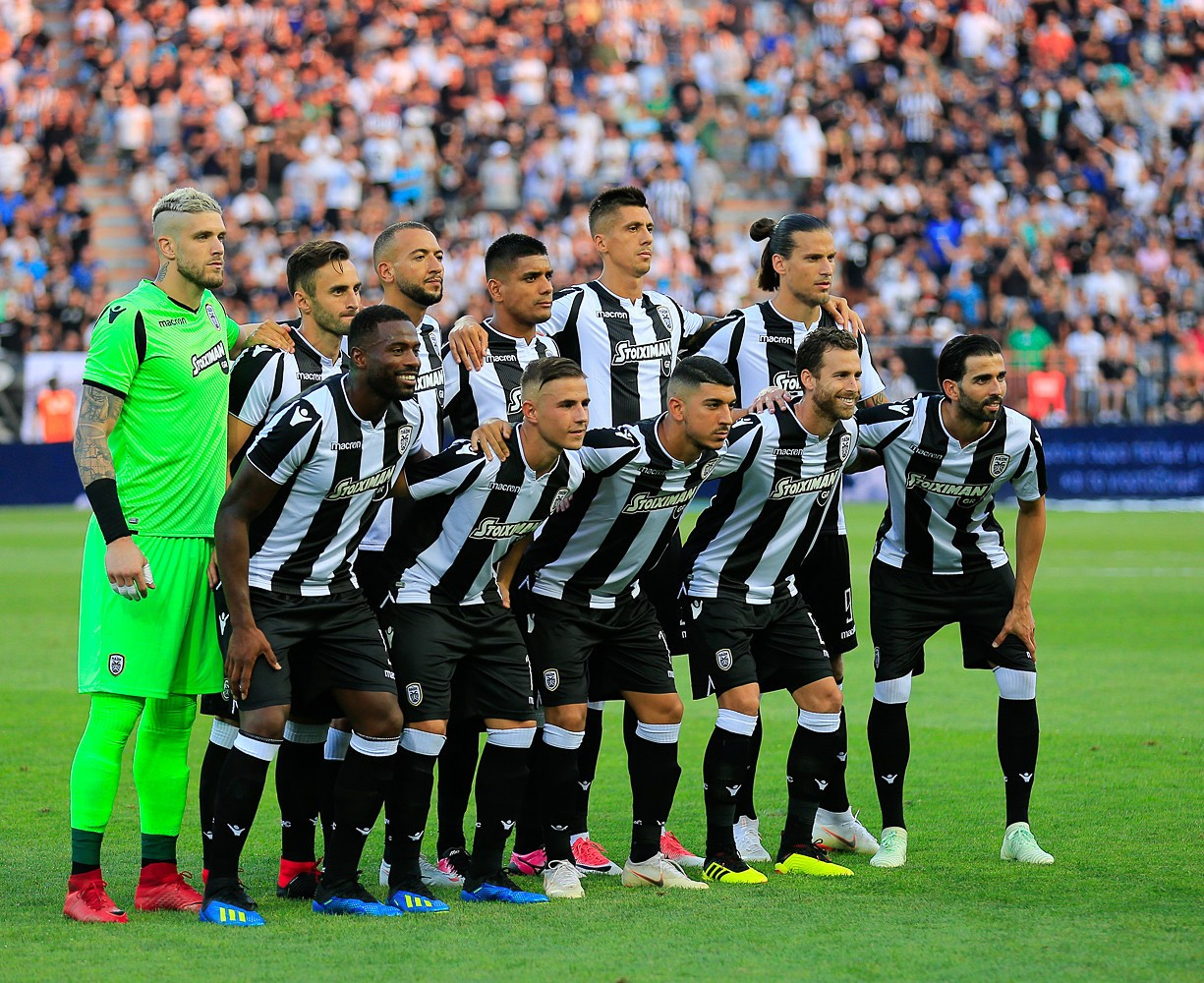
PAOK 3–2 Spartak Moscow, August 2018

PAOK 2018–19 unbeaten Champions (Akpom was the striker for the second half of the season)
Manager: (Romania) Răzvan Lucescu

2018–19 season was the best in club's history. During the 2018–19 Super League Greece, the major derbies, after decades in Greek football history, were refereed by foreign referees.

On 21 April, PAOK beat Levadiakos 5–0 and clinched the league title, hosting a memorable celebration. On 5 May, PAOK earned their 26th win in 30 games to complete an undefeated season (26–4–0 record). This is arguably the best performance in Greek football history, the previous held by Panathinaikos, who won the 1963–64 Alpha Ethniki title undefeated, but with a 24–6–0 record. PAOK were also the only unbeaten European football club in the national championships held across Europe during the 2018–2019 season.

On 11 May, PAOK won the Greek Cup for third consecutive year, defeating AEK Athens by 1–0. This was the third consecutive Greek Cup final against the same opponent and it was held for second consecutive year at the Olympic Stadium of Athens (AEK home ground at the time). The Video assistant referee (VAR) was used for the first time in Greek football and in a Greek Cup final. The winning goal came in the 45th minute with an overhead kick of Chuba Akpom. Dimitrios Pelkas provided the assist. With this Greek Cup victory, PAOK FC achieved a domestic Double for first time in their history.

Vieirinha was named MVP of the Season.

=== 2020–21 Greek Cup winners and UEFA Europa Conference League quarter-finalists ===
On 22 May 2021, under Uruguayan manager and fan favorite Pablo García, PAOK won their eighth Greek Cup title, beating Olympiacos 2–1 in the final held at the Athens Olympic Stadium with Michael Krmenčík scoring the winner in the 90th minute. In the 2021–22 season, PAOK reached the quarter-finals of the inaugural UEFA Conference League, losing 1–3 on aggregate to Marseille. On 21 May 2022, PAOK lost 1–0 to Panathinaikos in the Greek Cup final which was held at the Olympic Stadium of Athens.

2022–23 Greek Cup final disappointment and early European exit

The 2022–23 season started with an early elimination in the UECL 2nd Qualifying Round to Levski Sofia and a slow start in the league, being 5th at the end of October. However, the team resurged and entered the play–offs as title contenders, but, in a repeat of the previous season, failed to live up to expectations and finished 4th, 16 points below the top. The team's cup run was stopped at the final against AEK Athens, behind closed doors at the Panthessaliko Stadium, losing 2–0 even though AEK Athens received an early red card in the game.

=== 2023–24 Greek Championship and UEFA Conference League quarter-finalists ===

PAOK starting XI in the 2023–24 season (Ozdoyev, Despodov and Murg were also first-team regulars)
Manager: (Romania) Răzvan Lucescu

The 2023–24 season started with new signings in the summer window, such as Kiril Despodov. The team managed to suffice in the qualifying rounds of the Conference League, tightly beating Beitar Jerusalem and topping HNK Hajduk Split and Hearts in the 2nd, 3rd and play–off qualifying rounds respectively. In the group stage, the team defeated HJK before scoring a memorable home victory at an atmospheric Toumba Stadium against 2022 Europa League winners Eintracht Frankfurt 2–1 on injury time, a feat which the club would repeat against Aberdeen in Pittodrie, followed by a draw against Aberdeen at home.

In March, PAOK played Dinamo Zagreb at the Maksimir Stadium for the competition's round of 16, suffering a 2–0 defeat. However, in the return leg, PAOK managed an impressive 5–1 comeback, qualifying to the quarterfinals with a score of 5–3 on aggregate. The 2023–24 UEFA Conference League run ended in the quarter-finals where PAOK played against Club Brugge. In the first leg, PAOK lost 1–0. They didn't manage to make up for the loss in the second leg, where PAOK lost 0–2.

In 2023–24 season, PAOK after finishing first in the regular season, managed to remain on top after the conclusion of the play-offs winning their fourth Greek Championship on a remarkable fashion. PAOK defeated all their major rivals (AEK Athens, Olympiacos, Panathinaikos and Aris) in the last four matches, winning against the three league contenders from Athens at home and clinching the title with a 1–2 away victory over city rivals, Aris at Kleanthis Vikelidis Stadium on 19 May 2024.

Andrija Živković was named MVP of the Season.

== Crest and colours ==
=== Crest ===
The first emblem of PAOK depicted a four-leaf clover and a horseshoe. The leaves were green and above them were the initials of the word "PAOK". Kostas Koemtzopoulos, one of PAOK's founding members, came up with this idea, inspired by his favourite brand of cigarettes.

On 20 March 1929, Enosis Konstantinoupoliton Thessalonikis (A.E.K.) was dissolved and absorbed by PAOK and a mournful version of the double-headed eagle with the wings closed instead of stretched, indicating the grief for the lost homelands, was adopted as the club's new emblem.

On 11 June 2013, under the presidency of Ivan Savvidis, a golden outline was added to the crest, as a symbol of the club's Byzantine heritage.

During the 2018–19 season, the first emblem was used on the third kit.

=== Colours ===
The club's colours have always been black and white, black for the sorrow related to countless thousands of Greek refugees who were forced to leave the land their ancestors had been living in for centuries (Asia Minor, Eastern Thrace, Pontus, Caucasus) and white for the hope of a new beginning that came with settling in a new home. PAOK's traditional kit features a black and white vertical striped shirt, combined with black or white shorts and socks. Various types of shirts were used throughout the club's history and the most common alternatives were those with thinner or wider stripes, the all-black one and the all-white one. Over the years, several other colours were used on the 3rd kit, such as grey, silver, blue, purple, orange and red.

== Honours ==
=== Domestic ===
PAOK FC honours
Type	Competition	Titles	Seasons
Domestic	Super League Greece	4	1975–76, 1984–85, 2018–19, 2023–24
Domestic	Greek Cup	8	1971–72, 1973–74, 2000–01, 2002–03, 2016–17, 2017–18, 2018–19, 2020–21
Regional	Macedonia FCA Championship	7	1936–37, 1947–48, 1949–50, 1953–54, 1954–55, 1955–56, 1956–57
Regional	Macedonia–Thrace FCA Championship	1	1939–40

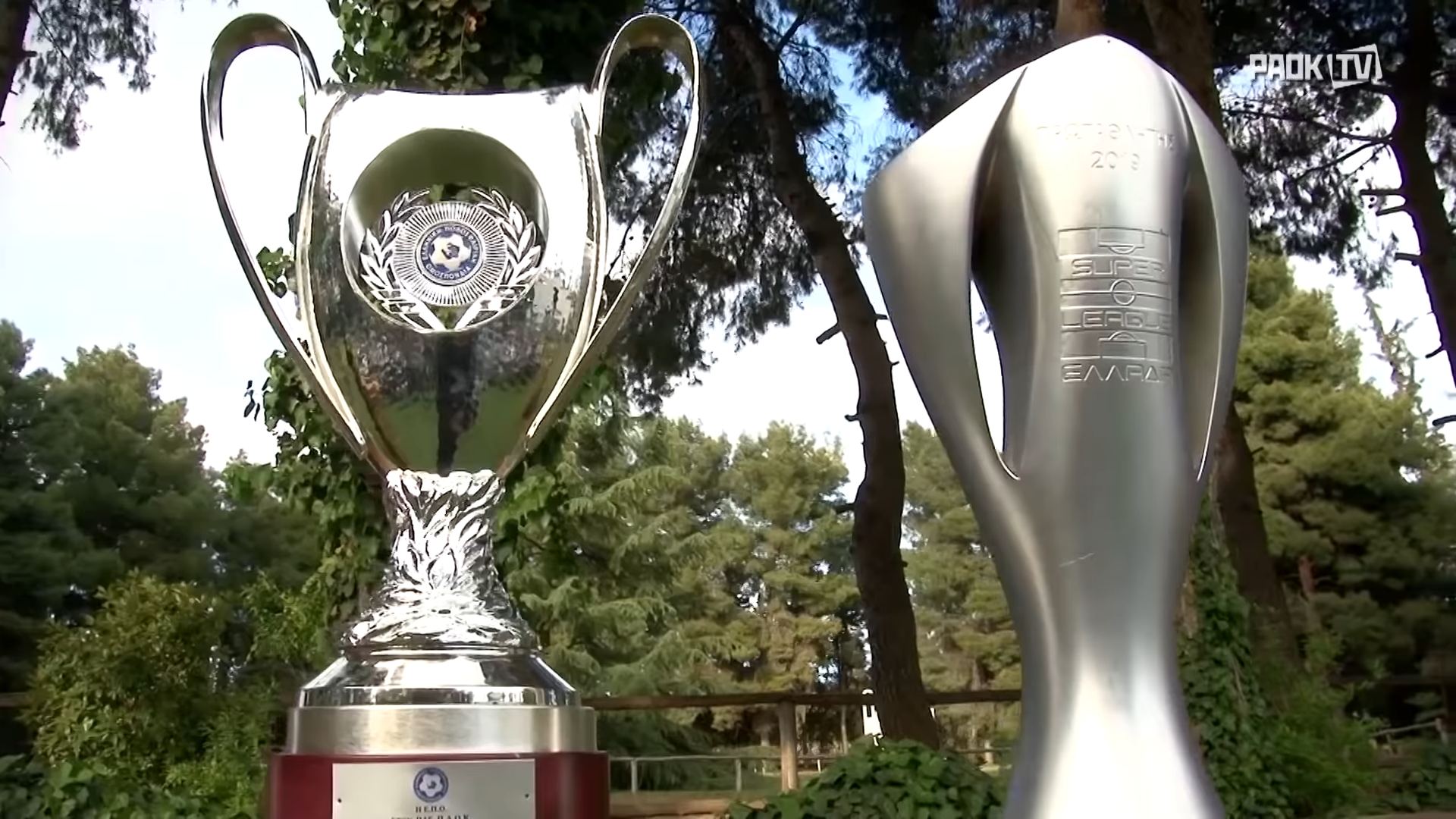
May 2019, team celebration party. Cup (left) and League (right) trophies

=== Double ===
- Winners (1): 2018–19

=== European competitions ===
- European Cup/UEFA Champions League
  - Round of 16 (1): 1976–77
- UEFA Cup Winners' Cup:
  - Quarter-finalists (1): 1973–74
- UEFA Europa League:
  - Round of 24 (2): 2024–25, 2025–26
- UEFA Conference League
  - Quarter-finalists (2): 2021–22, 2023–24

=== Minor & Unofficial Titles ===
- Greater Greece Cup
  - Winners (1): 1973
- OPAP Summer League
  - Winners (2): 1969, 1974

== See also ==
- P.A.O.K.
- PAOK FC
- List of PAOK FC managers
- PAOK B
- Greek refugees
- PAOK FC in European football
- List of PAOK FC records and statistics
- List of PAOK FC seasons
- PAOK FC (women)
- Thessaloniki
- Toumba (Thessaloniki)
- Toumba Stadium
- PAOK FC Sport Center
- PAOK Academy
- P.A.O.K. H.C.
- P.A.O.K H.C Women's Handball

== Bibliography ==
- Kanotas, Miltiadis (2005). 80 χρόνια, αυτός είναι ο ΠΑΟΚ [80 years, this is PAOK] (in Greek). Greece: Thessaloniki Publications.
- Kyritsis, Dimitris; Stefanidis, Anestis; Tsiompanoudi, Eleni (2005). ΠΑΟΚ, Πανθεσσαλονίκειος Αθλητικός Όμιλος Κωνσταντινοπουλιτών 1926–2005 [PAOK, Pan-Thessalonian Athletic Club of Constantinopolitans 1926–2005] (in Greek). Greece: Thessaloniki History Center. ISBN 978-960-88595-2-4.
- Bliatkas, Kostas (2005). Γιώργος Κούδας, της ζωής μου το παιχνίδι [Giorgos Koudas, the game of my life] (in Greek). Greece: Ianos Publications. ISBN 978-960-7827-35-7.
- Collective work (2009). Για πάντα πρωταθλητές, Π.Α.Ο.Κ. Ποδόσφαιρο-Μπάσκετ [Champions forever, P.A.O.K. Football-Basketball] (in Greek). Greece: SKAI. ISBN 978-960-482-020-7.
- Tsallos, Alexios (2010). Το αλφαβητάρι του ΠΑΟΚ [The PAOK alphabet book] (in Greek). Greece: Diavlos Publications. ISBN 978-960-531-259-6.
- Tsiolis, Stavros (2011). Ταξιδεύοντας με τον ΠΑΟΚ [Traveling with PAOK] (in Greek). Greece: Aigokeros Publications. ISBN 978-960-322-419-8.
- Petrakopoulos, Stavros (2016). Τα «μυθικά» του ΠΑΟΚ [PAOK’s ‘legendary’ moments] (in Greek). Greece: Friends Press. ISBN 978-618-82397-0-8.
- Zampounis, Christos (2016). ΠΑΟΚ αφού [PAOK, after all] (in Greek). Greece: Fereniki Publications. ISBN 978-960-9513-58-6.
- Ioannidis, Nikos (2017). Μια εποχή στο τσιμέντο [An era on the concrete] (in Greek). Greece: Topos Publications. ISBN 978-960-499-192-1.
- Edirnelis, Socrates (2018). Το κλεμμένο πρωτάθλημα [The stolen championship] (in Greek). Greece: ALDE Publications. ISBN 978-960-9451-89-5.
- Pappous, Michalis (2019). Ο ΠΑΟΚ του '70 [The PAOK of the '70s] (in Greek). Greece: University Studio Press. ISBN 978-960-12-2421-3.
- Vasilopoulos, Kostas (2023). Ραζβάν Λουτσέσκου, Double PAOK [Razvan Lucescu, Double PAOK] (in Greek). Greece: Fereniki Publications. ISBN 978-960-9513-89-0.

== Filmography ==
- Nikos Triantafyllidis. 90 χρόνια ΠΑΟΚ – Νοσταλγώντας το μέλλον [90 years of PAOK – Nostalgia for the future], 2016.
