= 2019 Greek Football Cup final =

2019 Greek Cup final
- Match poster
- Event: 2018–19 Greek Football Cup
PAOK	AEK Athens
1	0
- Date: 11 May 2019
- Venue: Olympic Stadium, Marousi, Athens
- Man of the Match: Chuba Akpom (PAOK)
- Referee: Felix Zwayer (Germany)
- Attendance: 1,040
- Weather: Fair; 17 °C (63 °F); 77% humidity

The 2019 Greek Cup final was the 75th final of the Greek Cup. It took place on 11 May 2019 at the Olympic Stadium. The contesting teams were PAOK and AEK Athens for a third time in row. It was PAOK's twentieth Greek Cup final and third consecutive, in their 93 years of existence and AEK Athens' twenty fourth Greek Cup final and fourth consecutive, of their 95-year history. For security issues, the match occurred behind closed doors with 1,500 invitations been distributed by both clubs and the HFF. It was the match in Greece to be held with VAR technology. With their conquest of the Cup, PAOK achieved the first double in their history.

== Venue ==
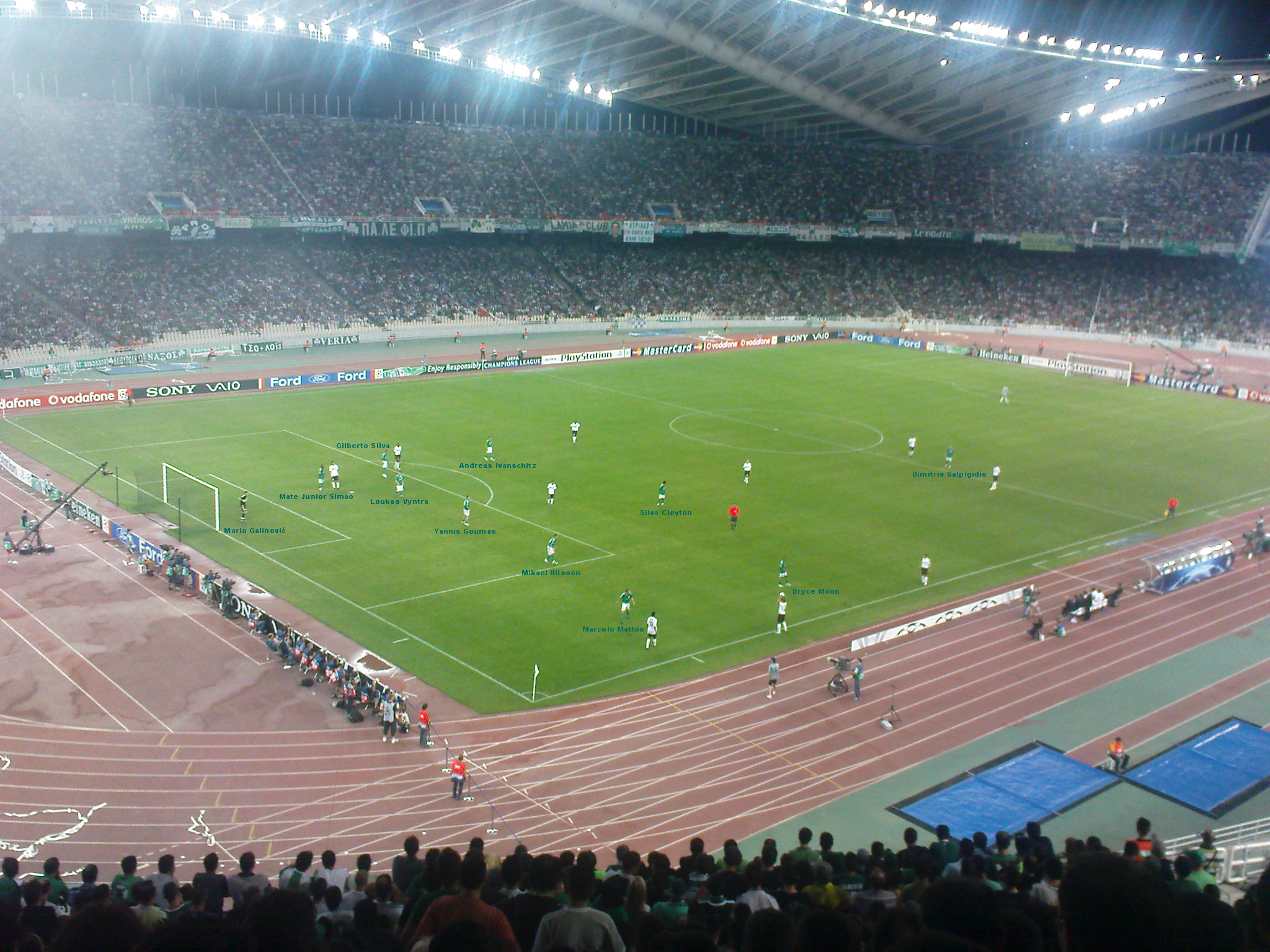
Athens Olympic Stadium.

This was the twenty fourth Greek Cup final held at the Athens Olympic Stadium, after the 1983, 1984, 1985, 1986, 1987, 1988, 1989, 1990, 1993, 1994, 1995, 1996, 1999, 2000, 2002, 2009, 2010, 2011, 2012, 2013, 2014, 2015, 2016 and 2018 finals.

The Athens Olympic Stadium was built in 1982 and renovated once in 2004. The stadium is used as a venue for AEK Athens, Panathinaikos and Greece and was used for Olympiacos on various occasions. Its current capacity is 69,618 and it hosted three European Cup/UEFA Champions League finals in 1983, 1994 and 2007, a UEFA Cup Winners' Cup final in 1987, the 1991 Mediterranean Games and the 2004 Summer Olympics.

== Background ==
PAOK had reached the Greek Cup final nineteen times, winning six of them. The last time that they had played in a final was in 2018, where they had won against AEK Athens by 2–0.

AEK Athens had reached the Greek Cup final twenty three times, winning fourteen of them. The last time that they had won the Cup was in 2016 (2–1 against Olympiacos). The last time that they had played in a final was in 2018, where they had lost to PAOK by 2–0.

The two teams had met each other in a Cup final five times in the 1939, 1978, 1983, 2017 and 2018 finals.

== Route to the final ==
PAOK				Round	AEK Athens			
Opponent	Result			Group stage	Opponent	Result		
Aris	1–1 (H)			Matchday 1	Lamia	2–1 (H)		
Ergotelis	2–1 (A)			Matchday 2	Apollon Larissa	4–0 (A)		
Aittitos Spata	6–0 (A)			Matchday 3	Volos	3–1 (A)		
Group D winners: Pos / Team / Pld / Pts; 1 / PAOK / 3 / 7; 2 / Ergotelis / 3 / 4; 3 / Aris / 3 / 4; 4 / Aittitos Spata / 3 / 1; Source: epo.gr				Final standings	Group B winners: Pos / Team / Pld / Pts; 1 / AEK Athens / 3 / 9; 2 / Lamia / 3 / 4; 3 / Volos / 3 / 4; 4 / Apollon Larissa / 3 / 0; Source: epo.gr			
Opponent	Agg.	1st leg	2nd leg	Knockout phase	Opponent	Agg.	1st leg	2nd leg
Panachaiki	6–2	1–2 (A)	5–0 (H)	Round of 16	AO Chania−Kissamikos	6–1	1–1 (A)	5–0 (H)
Panionios	5–4	1–2 (A)	4–2 (a.e.t.) (H)	Quarter-finals	Atromitos	4–0	1–0 (A)	3–0 (H)
Asteras Tripolis	2–0	2–0 (H)	0–0 (A)	Semi-finals	Lamia	6–0	2–0 (H)	4–0 (A)

== Match ==
=== Details ===
11 May 2019
20:30 EEST

PAOK	1–0	AEK Athens
Akpom 45+1'	Report

Olympic Stadium, Marousi
Attendance: 1,040
Referee: Felix Zwayer (Germany)

PAOK	AEK Athens

GK	31	(Greece) Alexandros Paschalakis
RB	3	(Brazil) Léo Matos
CB	15	(Spain) José Ángel Crespo
CB	5	(Cape Verde) Fernando Varela
LB	23	(Greece) Dimitris Giannoulis
DM	87	(Spain) José Cañas
CM	28	(Ukraine) Yevhen Shakhov
RM	98	(Brazil) Léo Jabá		(substituted off) 66'
LM	21	(Netherlands) Diego Biseswar		(substituted off) 90+3'
AM	10	(Greece) Dimitrios Pelkas (c)		(substituted off) 80'
CF	47	(England) Chuba Akpom	(yellow card) 38'
Substitutes:
GK	60	(Greece) Symeon Papadopoulos
DF	4	(Iceland) Sverrir Ingi Ingason		(substituted on) 90+3'
DF	32	(Greece) Lefteris Lyratzis
MF	26	(Portugal) Sérgio Oliveira		(substituted on) 80'
FW	18	(Greece) Dimitrios Limnios		(substituted on) 66'
FW	90	(Brazil) Pedro Henrique
FW	9	(Poland) Karol Świderski
Manager:
(Romania) Răzvan Lucescu

GK	1	(Greece) Vasilis Barkas
RB	2	(Greece) Michalis Bakakis		(substituted off) 80'
CB	4	(Greece) Marios Oikonomou	(yellow card) 26'
CB	19	(Ukraine) Dmytro Chyhrynskyi
LB	23	(Sweden) Niklas Hult
DM	8	(Portugal) André Simões
CM	6	(Serbia) Nenad Krstičić	(yellow card) 43'	(substituted off) 76'
RM	14	(Greece) Anastasios Bakasetas		(substituted off) 71'
LM	20	(Greece) Petros Mantalos (c)
SS	10	(Croatia) Marko Livaja	(yellow card) 28'
CF	22	(Argentina) Ezequiel Ponce	(yellow card) 67'
Substitutes:
GK	16	(Greece) Panagiotis Tsintotas
DF	12	(Brazil) Rodrigo Galo	(yellow card) 90+6'	(substituted on) 71'
DF	24	(Greece) Stratos Svarnas
DF	50	(Greece) Michalis Bousis
MF	25	(Greece) Konstantinos Galanopoulos		(substituted on) 80'
FW	77	(Greece) Christos Giousis
FW	31	(Argentina) Lucas Boyé		(substituted on) 76'
Manager:
(Spain) Manolo Jiménez

Man of the Match:
(England) Chuba Akpom (PAOK)

Assistant referees:
Mark Borsch (Germany)
Marco Achmüller (Germany)
Fourth official:
Thorsten Schiffner (Germany)
Video assistant referee:
Sascha Stegemann (Germany)
Assistant video assistant referee:
Sven Jablonski (Germany)

Match rules

- 90 minutes
- 30 minutes of extra time if necessary
- Penalty shootout if scores still level
- Seven named substitutes
- Maximum of three substitutions
