= 2017 Greek Football Cup final =

2017 Greek Cup final
- Match poster
- Event: 2016–17 Greek Football Cup
PAOK	AEK Athens
2	1
- Date: 6 May 2017
- Venue: Panthessaliko Stadium, Volos
- Man of the Match: Diego Biseswar (PAOK)
- Referee: Giorgos Kominis (Thesprotia)
- Attendance: 19,236
- Weather: Fair; 17 °C (63 °F); 43% humidity

The 2017 Greek Cup final was the 73rd final of the Greek Cup. It took place on 6 May 2017 at Panthessaliko Stadium. The contesting teams were PAOK and AEK Athens. It was PAOK's eighteenth Greek Cup final in their 91 years of existence and AEK Athens' twenty second Greek Cup final and second consecutive, of their 93-year history. The HFF announcement for the 2016–17 Greek Cup mentioned the Olympic Stadium as the host for the final, but PAOK had clarified that they did not want to play at AEK Athens' home stadium, suggesting the Pankritio Stadium, however, the Federation chose the Panthessaliko Stadium. It was a stadium that until the completion of the semi-finals, did not actually exist on the table. The people of Thessaly Football Clubs Association quickly made the decision to submit a file after the qualification of PAOK to the final. In fact, within two hours, they tilted the plate in favor of conducting the game in their area, submitting a complete file. So it was decided that the final would take place at Volos with fans of both clubs and special constructions for the security in the conduction of the match. However, the match was marked by incidents between the fans of both clubs in the streets, inside and outside the stadium, where also was an invasion on the pitch by PAOK fans before the beginning of the match which resulted in punishment on both clubs for the next season.

== Venue ==
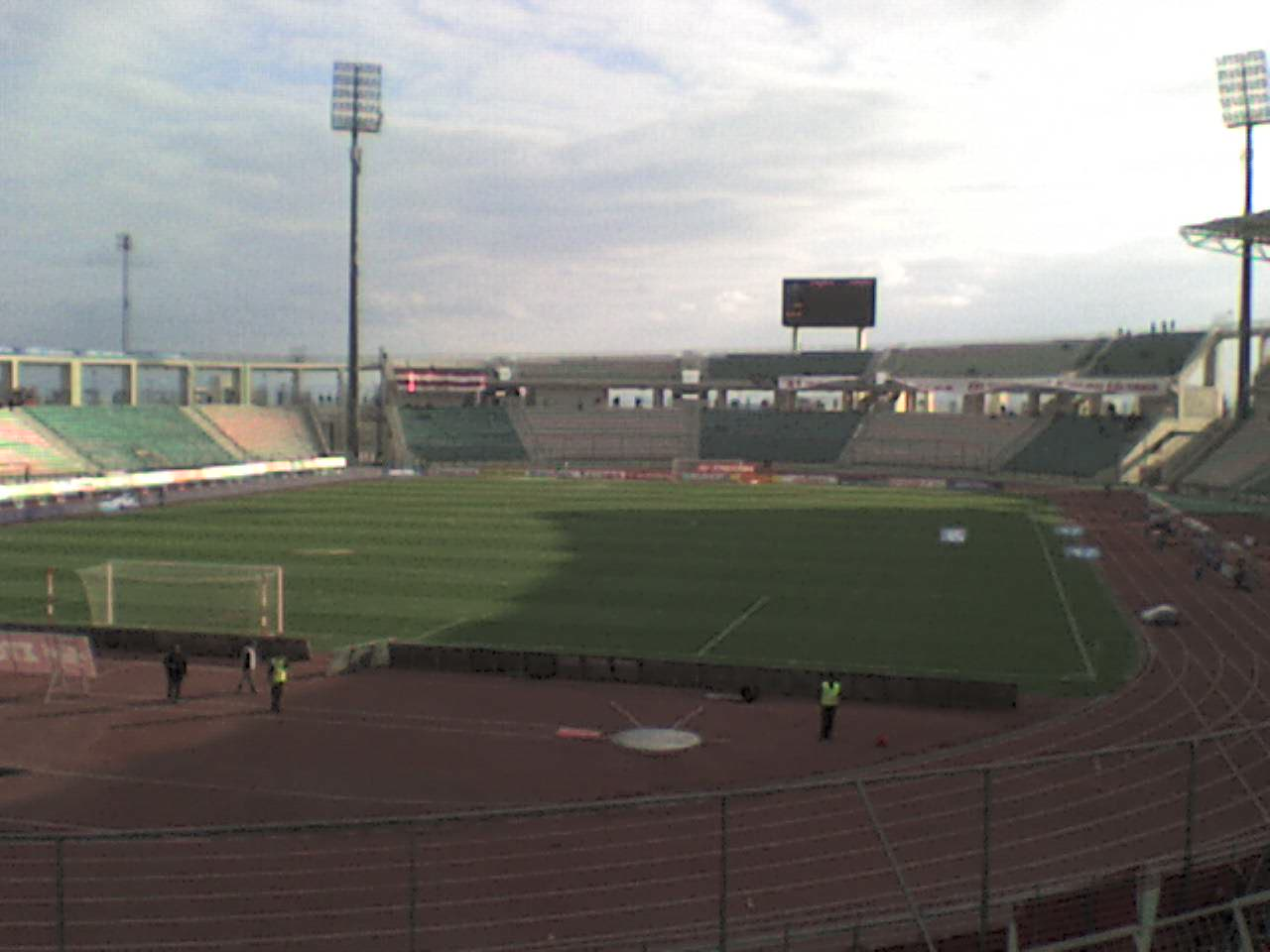
Panthessaliko Stadium.

This was the second Greek Cup final held at Panthessaliko Stadium after the 2007 final.

Panthessaliko Stadium was built in 2004. The stadium is used as a venue for Niki Volos and Volos. Its current capacity is 22,189.

== Background ==
PAOK had reached the Greek Cup final seventeen times, winning four of them. The last time that they had won the Cup was in 2003 (1–0 against Aris). The last time that had played in a final was in 2014, where they had lost to Panathinaikos by 4–1.

AEK Athens had reached the Greek Cup final twenty one times, winning fourteen of them. The last time that they had played in a final was in 2016, where they had won against Olympiacos by 2–1.

The two teams had met each other in a Cup final three times in the 1939, 1978 and 1983 finals.

== Route to the final ==
PAOK				Round	AEK Athens			
Opponent	Result			Group stage	Opponent	Result		
AEL	2–0 (H)			Matchday 1	Kerkyra	4–0 (H)		
Trikala	0–0 (A)			Matchday 2	Anagennisi Karditsa	2–2 (H)		
Panelefsiniakos	7–0 (A)			Matchday 3	Lamia	0–0 (A)		
Group A winners: Pos / Team / Pld / Pts; 1 / PAOK / 3 / 7; 2 / Trikala / 3 / 7; 3 / AEL / 3 / 3; 4 / Panelefsiniakos / 3 / 0; Source: epo.gr				Final standings	Group F winners: Pos / Team / Pld / Pts; 1 / AEK Athens / 3 / 5; 2 / Lamia / 3 / 5; 3 / Kerkyra / 3 / 4; 4 / Anagennisi Karditsa / 3 / 1; Source: epo.gr			
Opponent	Agg.	1st leg	2nd leg	Knockout phase	Opponent	Agg.	1st leg	2nd leg
Panetolikos	6–1	2–0 (A)	4–1 (H)	Round of 16	Levadiakos	7–0	1–0 (A)	6–0 (H)
Xanthi	2–2 (a)	2–1 (A)	0–1 (H)	Quarter-finals	Platanias	3–0	0–0 (A)	3–0 (H)
Panathinaikos	4–2	0–2 (A)	4–0 (H)	Semi-finals	Olympiacos	2–2 (a)	2–1 (A)	0–1 (H)

== Match ==
=== Details ===
6 May 2017
21:00 EEST

PAOK	2–1	AEK Athens
Biseswar 24'; Henrique 81'	Report	Christodoulopoulos 26'

Panthessaliko Stadium, Volos
Attendance: 19,236
Referee: Giorgos Kominis (Thesprotia)

PAOK	AEK Athens

GK	71	(Greece) Panagiotis Glykos (c)	(yellow card) 90+4'
RB	3	(Brazil) Léo Matos	(yellow card) 70'
CB	15	(Spain) José Ángel Crespo	(yellow card) 14'
CB	43	(Cape Verde) Fernando Varela
LB	4	(Croatia) Marin Leovac
DM	87	(Spain) José Cañas
CM	28	(Ukraine) Yevhen Shakhov
CM	16	(Bosnia and Herzegovina) Gojko Cimirot		(substituted off) 86'
RW	10	(Angola) Djalma Campos		(substituted off) 73'
LW	21	(Netherlands) Diego Biseswar		(substituted off) 90'
CF	9	(Serbia) Aleksandar Prijović
Substitutes:
GK	99	(Greece) Marios Siampanis
DF	70	(Greece) Stelios Kitsiou		(substituted on) 90'
DF	13	(Greece) Stelios Malezas		(substituted on) 86'
MF	77	(Greece) Dimitrios Pelkas
FW	11	(Brazil) Pedro Henrique	(yellow card) 88'	(substituted on) 73'
FW	40	(Cyprus) Nikolas Mattheou
FW	33	(Greece) Stefanos Athanasiadis
Manager:
(Serbia) Vladimir Ivić

GK	22	(Greece) Giannis Anestis
RB	12	(Brazil) Rodrigo Galo
CB	4	(Bosnia and Herzegovina) Ognjen Vranješ
CB	19	(Ukraine) Dmytro Chyhrynskyi
LB	23	(Spain) Dídac Vilà
DM	18	(Sweden) Jakob Johansson
DM	8	(Portugal) André Simões	(yellow card) 80'	(substituted off) 83'
RM	7	(Greece) Lazaros Christodoulopoulos		(substituted off) 86'
LM	29	(Argentina) Patito Rodríguez	(yellow card) 16'	(substituted off) 68'
AM	20	(Greece) Petros Mantalos (c)
CF	11	(Argentina) Sergio Araujo
Substitutes:
GK	1	(Greece) Vasilis Barkas
DF	26	(Greece) Dimitrios Kolovetsios
MF	25	(Greece) Konstantinos Galanopoulos		(substituted on) 68'
MF	30	(Greece) Ilias Tselios
FW	10	(Venezuela) Ronald Vargas		(substituted on) 86'
FW	28	(Greece) Anastasios Bakasetas
FW	9	(Portugal) Hugo Almeida		(substituted on) 83'
Manager:
(Spain) Manolo Jiménez

Man of the Match:
(Netherlands) Diego Biseswar (PAOK)

Assistant referees:
Christos Baltas (Achaea)
Giorgos Kalfoglou (Thesprotia)
Additional assistant referees:
Anastasios Sidiropoulos (Dodecanese)
Dimitris Thanos (Grevena)
Fourth official:
Charalambos Kalogeropoulos (Athens)

Match rules

- 90 minutes
- 30 minutes of extra time if necessary
- Penalty shootout if scores still level
- Seven named substitutes
- Maximum of three substitutions
