= 2022 Greek Football Cup final =

2022 Greek Cup final
- Match poster
- Event: 2021–22 Greek Football Cup
Panathinaikos	PAOK
1	0
- Date: 21 May 2022
- Venue: Olympic Stadium, Marousi, Athens
- Man of the Match: Aitor Cantalapiedra (Panathinaikos)
- Referee: Antonio Mateu Lahoz (Spain)
- Attendance: 45,409
- Weather: Fair; 21 °C (70 °F); 31% humidity

The 2022 Greek Cup final was the 78th final of the Greek Cup. It took place on 21 May 2022 at the Olympic Stadium. The contesting teams were Panathinaikos and PAOK. It was Panathinaikos' thirtieth Greek Cup final in their 114 years of existence and PAOK's twenty second Greek Cup final and second consecutive, of their 96-year history. The game was marked by incidents and specifically, when Aitor after scoring for Panathinaikos celebrated in front of the stands of the PAOK ultras. As a result, a stone was thrown to his hand, injuring him with tensions occurring between the players of both teams immediately after. The referee interrupted the match and in fact, as he headed to the locker room, he was holding the stone that hit the player.

== Venue ==
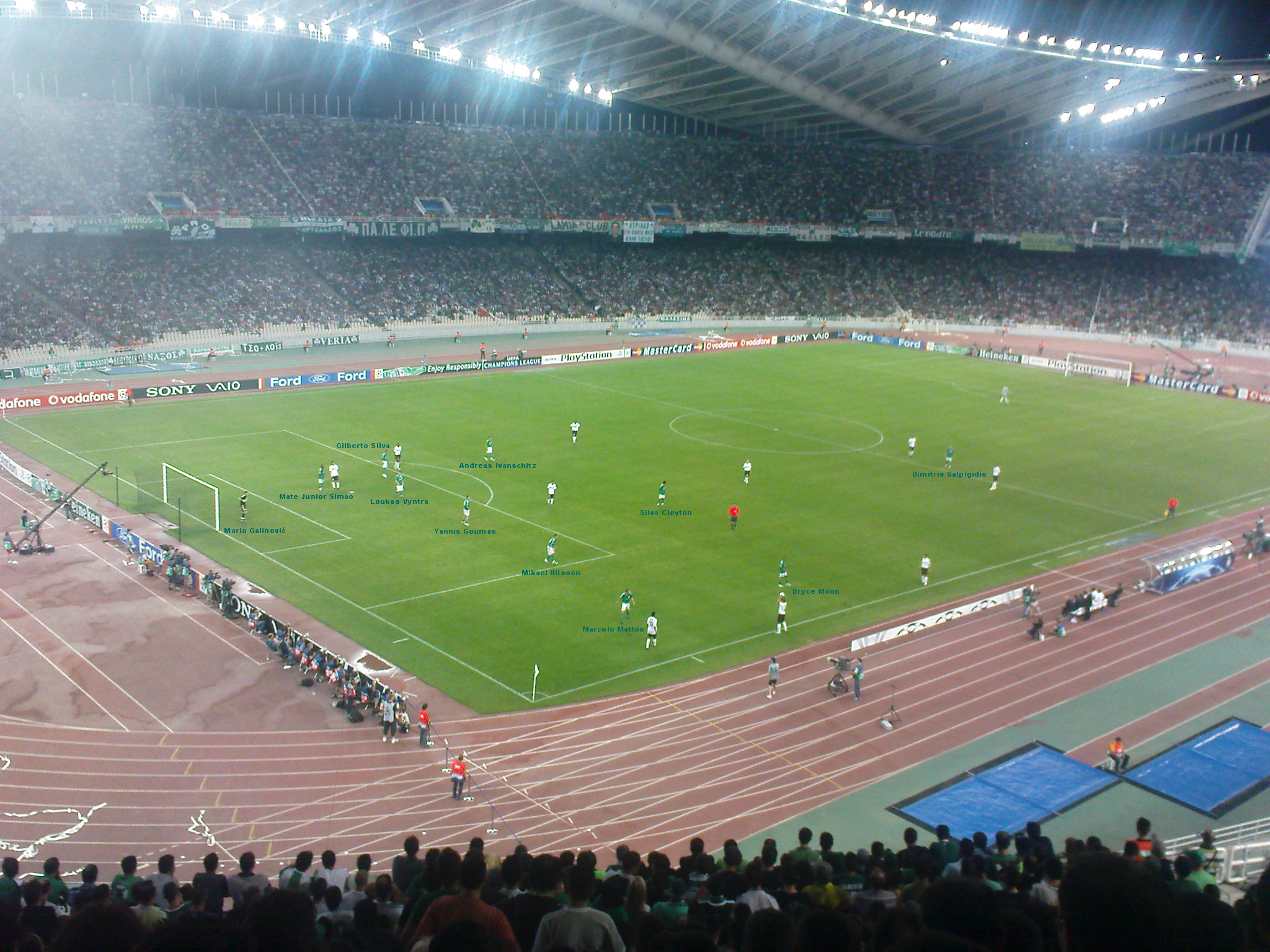
Athens Olympic Stadium.

This was the twenty sixth Greek Cup final held at the Athens Olympic Stadium, after the 1983, 1984, 1985, 1986, 1987, 1988, 1989, 1990, 1993, 1994, 1995, 1996, 1999, 2000, 2002, 2009, 2010, 2011, 2012, 2013, 2014, 2015, 2016, 2018, 2019 and 2021 finals.

The Athens Olympic Stadium was built in 1982 and renovated once in 2004. The stadium is used as a venue for AEK Athens and Greece and was used for Olympiacos and Panathinaikos on various occasions. Its current capacity is 69,618 and it hosted three European Cup/UEFA Champions League finals in 1983, 1994 and 2007, a UEFA Cup Winners' Cup final in 1987, the 1991 Mediterranean Games and the 2004 Summer Olympics.

== Background ==
Panathinaikos had reached the Greek Cup final twenty-nine times, winning eighteen of them. The last time that they had played in a final was in 2014, where they had won against PAOK by 4–1.

PAOK had reached the Greek Cup final twenty-one times, winning eight of them. The last time that they had played in a final was in 2021, where they had won against Olympiacos by 2–1.

The two teams had met each other in a Cup final four times in the 1955, 1972, 1977 and 2014 finals.

== Route to the final ==
Panathinaikos				Round	PAOK			
Opponent	Agg.	1st leg	2nd leg		Opponent	Agg.	1st leg	2nd leg
Atromitos	1–0 (A)			Fifth round	Bye			
Volos	2–1	2–1 (H)	0–0 (A)	Round of 16	AEL	4–2	1–1 (A)	3–1 (H)
Anagennisi Karditsa	5–0	4–0 (H)	1–0 (A)	Quarter-finals	AEK Athens	2–1	0–0 (H)	2–1 (A)
Lamia	3–0	1–0 (H)	2–0 (A)	Semi-finals	Olympiacos	1–1 (a)	0–0 (H)	1–1 (A)

== Match ==
=== Details ===
21 May 2022
20:00 EEST

Panathinaikos	1–0	PAOK
Aitor 34' (pen.)	Report

Olympic Stadium, Marousi
Attendance: 45,409
Referee: Antonio Mateu Lahoz (Spain)

Panathinaikos	PAOK

GK	91	(Italy) Alberto Brignoli
RB	27	(Greece) Giannis Kotsiras
CB	4	(Spain) Fran Vélez (c)
CB	5	(Netherlands) Bart Schenkeveld
LB	3	(Spain) Juankar
DM	17	(Spain) Rubén Pérez
CM	19	(Argentina) Lucas Villafáñez		(substituted off) 68'
RM	34	(Argentina) Sebastián Palacios		(substituted off) 90+4'
LM	22	(Spain) Aitor Cantalapiedra
AM	50	(Serbia) Mijat Gaćinović	(yellow card) 66'	(substituted off) 76'
CF	7	(Greece) Fotis Ioannidis		(substituted off) 76'
Substitutes:
GK	1	(Greece) Sokratis Dioudis
DF	31	(Croatia) Zvonimir Šarlija		(substituted on) 90+4'
DF	2	(Greece) Georgios Vagiannidis
DF	14	(Argentina) Facundo Sánchez
MF	21	(Greece) Dimitrios Kourbelis		(substituted on) 68'
ΜF	88	(Brazil) Maurício
MF	6	(Greece) Sotiris Alexandropoulos	(yellow card) 90+5'	(substituted on) 76'
FW	98	(Brazil) Mateus Vital
FW	10	(Spain) Carlitos		(substituted on) 76'
Manager:
(Serbia) Ivan Jovanović

GK	31	(Greece) Alexandros Paschalakis
RB	19	(Greece) Lefteris Lyratzis
CB	4	(Iceland) Sverrir Ingi Ingason
CB	15	(Spain) José Ángel Crespo	(yellow card) 90+7'
LB	20	(Portugal) Vieirinha (c)	(red card) 90+8'	(substituted off) 46'
CM	33	(Brazil) Douglas Augusto	(yellow card) 8'	(substituted off) 52'
CM	27	(Slovenia) Jasmin Kurtić	(yellow card) 90+7'
RM	14	(Serbia) Andrija Živković	(yellow card) 90+7' (yellow-red card) 90+8'
LM	21	(Suriname) Diego Biseswar		(substituted off) 62'
AM	50	(Portugal) Filipe Soares	(yellow card) 22'	(substituted off) 46'
CF	47	(England) Chuba Akpom		(substituted off) 68'
Substitutes:
GK	64	(Greece) Christos Talichmanidis
DF	5	(Cape Verde) Fernando Varela
DF	59	(Greece) Konstantinos Koulierakis
DF	16	(Brazil) Sidcley		(substituted on) 46'
MF	22	(Austria) Stefan Schwab		(substituted on) 52'
MF	7	(Morocco) Omar El Kaddouri		(substituted on) 46'
FW	28	(Romania) Alexandru Mitriță	(yellow card) 90+7'	(substituted on) 62'
FW	18	(Portugal) Nélson Oliveira
FW	29	(Croatia) Antonio Čolak		(substituted on) 68'
Manager:
(Romania) Răzvan Lucescu

Man of the Match:
Aitor Cantalapiedra (Panathinaikos)

Assistant referees:
Pau Cebrián Devís (Spain)
Roberto Díaz Pérez del Palomar (Spain)
Fourth official:
Evaggelos Manouchos (Argolida)
Video assistant referee:
Ricardo de Burgos Bengoetxea (Spain)
Assistant video assistant referee:
Angelos Evangelou (Athens)

Match rules

- 90 minutes
- 30 minutes of extra time if necessary
- Penalty shoot-out if scores still level
- Nine named substitutes, of which up to five may be used at maximum three times, with a sixth allowed in extra time.
