= Anastasios Kakos =

Greek football referee (born 1970)

Tasos Kakos
- Full name: Anastasios Kakos
- Born: 15 August 1970 (age 56); Corfu, Greece
- Other occupation: Rowing; Athletics; Football

Domestic
| Years | League | Role |
| 2004–2014 | Super League Greece | referee |

International
| Years | League | Role |
| 2008–2014 | UEFA | referee |
| 2008–2014 | FIFA | referee |

Anastasios Kakos (Greek: Αναστάσιος Κάκος; born 15 August 1970) is a Greek former international football referee. He belonged at the Corfu association.

Kakos started his involvement in sports, from the rowing department of NAO Kerkyra from 1982 to 1986, winning during this time the third place in a Panhellenic Event. From 1986 to 1987 he was involved in athletics and from 1987 to 1997 he played football in Kerkyra, Kassiopi and Faikas. In the summer of 1997, he decided to stop football and turn to refereeing, refereeing the games of the local Corfu league.

In 2000, Kakos was promoted to the fourth division, where he was named the 3rd best referee among 180 referees. In 2001 he was promoted to the third division, where he was named the 6th best referee among 85. He stayed in the third division until November 2002. In the second division he took the 5th best place in the evaluation, while in the 2003–04 season he came out 2nd. He was promoted to the first division in 2004. Kakos became a FIFA referee in 2008. He has served as a referee at international competitions, including UEFA Euro 2012 qualification and the 2010 and 2014 World Cup qualifiers. He refereed at 2012–13 UEFA Europa League. Kakos has refereed in three consecutives Greek Cup finals, from 2009 to 2011 and in the 2014 final, which was also his last game, since after that he announced his retirement as a referee. Since then, he has been invited to referee matches of a friendly, charity nature.

In November 2018 he was a refereeing commentator on the Total Football show on Open TV, until January 2023, when he left the show.
