= 2018 Greek Football Cup final =

2018 Greek Cup final
- Match poster
- Event: 2017–18 Greek Football Cup
AEK Athens	PAOK
0	2
- Date: 12 May 2018
- Venue: Olympic Stadium, Marousi, Athens
- Man of the Match: Vieirinha (PAOK)
- Referee: David Fernández Borbalán (Spain)
- Attendance: 35,545
- Weather: Fair; 19 °C (66 °F); 40% humidity

The 2018 Greek Cup final was the 74th final of the Greek Cup. It took place on 12 May 2018 at the Olympic Stadium. The contesting teams were AEK Athens and PAOK for a second time in row. It was AEK Athens' twenty third Greek Cup final and third consecutive, of their 94-year history and PAOK's nineteenth Greek Cup final and second consecutive, in their 92 years of existence.

== Venue ==
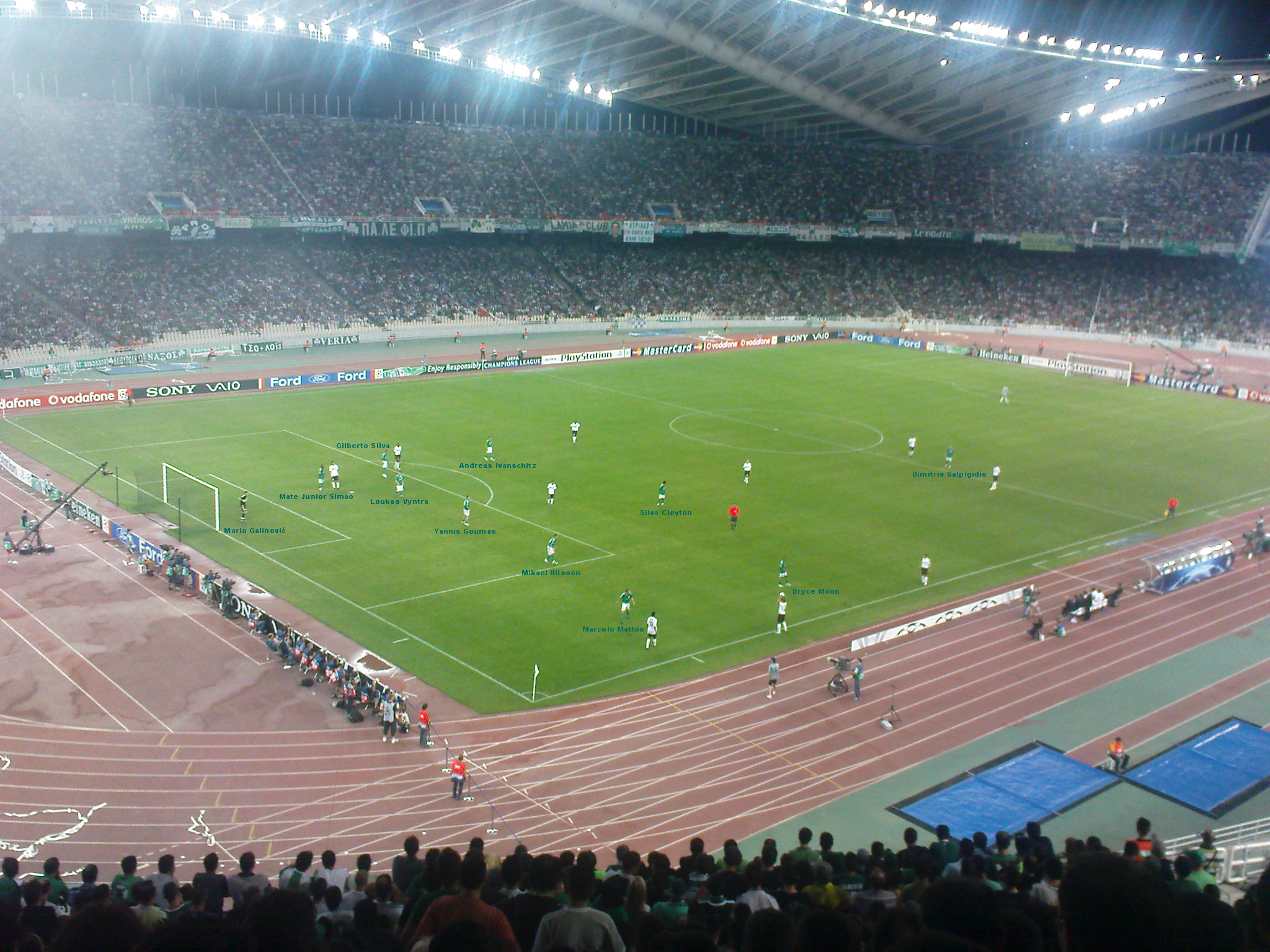
Athens Olympic Stadium.

This was the twenty third Greek Cup final held at the Athens Olympic Stadium, after the 1983, 1984, 1985, 1986, 1987, 1988, 1989, 1990, 1993, 1994, 1995, 1996, 1999, 2000, 2002, 2009, 2010, 2011, 2012, 2013, 2014, 2015 and 2016 finals.

The Athens Olympic Stadium was built in 1982 and renovated once in 2004. The stadium is used as a venue for AEK Athens and was used for Olympiacos, Panathinaikos and Greece on various occasions. Its current capacity is 69,618 and it hosted three European Cup/UEFA Champions League finals in 1983, 1994 and 2007, a UEFA Cup Winners' Cup final in 1987, the 1991 Mediterranean Games and the 2004 Summer Olympics.

== Background ==
AEK Athens had reached the Greek Cup final twenty two times, winning fourteen of them. The last time that they had won the Cup was in 2016 (2–1 against Olympiacos). The last time that had played in a final was in 2017, where they had lost to PAOK by 2–1.

PAOK had reached the Greek Cup final eighteen times, winning five of them. The last time that they had played in a final was in 2017, where they had won against AEK Athens by 2–1.

The two teams had met each other in a Cup final four times in the 1939, 1978, 1983 and 2017 finals.

== Route to the final ==
AEK Athens				Round	PAOK			
Opponent	Result			Group stage	Opponent	Result		
Lamia	2–0 (H)			Matchday 1	Levadiakos	2–1 (H)		
Apollon Larissa	7–0 (A)			Matchday 2	Apollon Pontus	1–0 (A)		
Kallithea	3–2 (A)			Matchday 3	Aiginiakos	5–0 (A)		
Group C winners: Pos / Team / Pld / Pts; 1 / AEK Athens / 3 / 9; 2 / Lamia / 3 / 6; 3 / Apollon Larissa / 3 / 3; 4 / Kallithea / 3 / 0; Source: epo.gr				Final standings	Group B winners: Pos / Team / Pld / Pts; 1 / PAOK / 3 / 9; 2 / Levadiakos / 3 / 6; 3 / Apollon Pontus / 3 / 3; 4 / Aiginiakos / 3 / 0; Source: epo.gr			
Opponent	Agg.	1st leg	2nd leg	Knockout phase	Opponent	Agg.	1st leg	2nd leg
Panetolikos	5–0	4–0 (A)	1–0 (H)	Round of 16	Trikala	7–2	5–1 (A)	2–1 (H)
Olympiacos	2–1	0–0 (A)	2–1 (H)	Quarter-finals	Atromitos	5–1	2–0 (H)	3–1 (A)
AEL	2–2 (a)	1–2 (A)	1–0 (H)	Semi-finals	Panionios	6–2	3–1 (A)	3–1 (H)

== Match ==
=== Details ===
12 May 2018
20:30 EEST

AEK Athens	0–2	PAOK
	Report	Vieirinha 65'; Pelkas 90+2'

Olympic Stadium, Marousi
Attendance: 35,545
Referee: David Fernández Borbalán (Spain)

AEK Athens	PAOK

GK	1	(Greece) Vasilis Barkas
RB	2	(Greece) Michalis Bakakis
CB	4	(Bosnia and Herzegovina) Ognjen Vranješ	(yellow card) 64' (yellow-red card) 80'
CB	19	(Ukraine) Dmytro Chyhrynskyi
LB	23	(Sweden) Niklas Hult		(substituted off) 53'
DM	8	(Portugal) André Simões
CM	25	(Greece) Konstantinos Galanopoulos	(yellow card) 90'
RM	14	(Greece) Anastasios Bakasetas	(yellow card) 71'	(substituted off) 73'
LM	10	(Croatia) Marko Livaja	(yellow card) 46'
AM	20	(Greece) Petros Mantalos (c)		(substituted off) 67'
CF	11	(Argentina) Sergio Araujo
Substitutes:
GK	16	(Greece) Panagiotis Tsintotas
DF	5	(Greece) Vasilios Lampropoulos
DF	12	(Brazil) Rodrigo Galo		(substituted on) 53'
DF	33	(Greece) Giorgos Giannoutsos
FW	77	(Greece) Christos Giousis
FW	7	(Greece) Lazaros Christodoulopoulos		(substituted on) 67'
FW	9	(Greece) Giorgos Giakoumakis		(substituted on) 73'
Manager:
(Spain) Manolo Jiménez

GK	31	(Greece) Alexandros Paschalakis
RB	3	(Brazil) Léo Matos	(yellow card) 21'
CB	15	(Spain) José Ángel Crespo	(yellow card) 45+1'
CB	5	(Cape Verde) Fernando Varela	(yellow card) 80' (red card) 90+4'
LB	88	(Portugal) Vieirinha (c)		(substituted off) 82'
DM	87	(Spain) José Cañas
DM	8	(Brazil) Maurício	(red card) 80'
RM	10	(Angola) Djalma Campos	(yellow card) 6'	(substituted off) 52'
LM	21	(Netherlands) Diego Biseswar		(substituted off) 75'
AM	77	(Greece) Dimitrios Pelkas	(yellow card) 90+3'
CF	9	(Serbia) Aleksandar Prijović
Substitutes:
GK	99	(Greece) Marios Siampanis
DF	13	(Greece) Stelios Malezas		(substituted on) 82'
MF	28	(Ukraine) Yevhen Shakhov		(substituted on) 75'
MF	7	(Morocco) Omar El Kaddouri
FW	29	(Slovakia) Róbert Mak		(substituted on) 52'
FW	18	(Greece) Dimitrios Limnios
FW	20	(Greece) Efthymis Koulouris
Manager:
(Romania) Răzvan Lucescu

Man of the Match:
(Portugal) Vieirinha (PAOK)

Assistant referees:
Raúl Cabañero Martínez (Spain)
José Manuel Matías Caballero (Spain)
Additional assistant referees:
Jesús Gil Manzano (Spain)
Carlos del Cerro Grande (Spain)
Fourth official:
Anastasios Sidiropoulos (Dodecanese)

Match rules

- 90 minutes
- 30 minutes of extra time if necessary
- Penalty shootout if scores still level
- Seven named substitutes
- Maximum of three substitutions
