= 2014 Greek Football Cup final =

2014 Greek Cup final
- Event: 2013–14 Greek Football Cup
Panathinaikos	PAOK
4	1
- Date: 26 April 2014
- Venue: Olympic Stadium, Marousi, Athens
- Man of the Match: Marcus Berg (Panathinaikos)
- Referee: Anastassios Kakos (Corfu)
- Attendance: 44,356
- Weather: Mostly Cloudy; 17 °C (63 °F); 82% humidity

The 2014 Greek Cup final was the 70th final of the Greek Cup. It took place on 26 April 2014 at the Olympic Stadium. The contesting teams were Panathinaikos and PAOK. It was Panathinaikos' twenty ninth Greek Cup final in their 106 years of existence and PAOK's seventeenth Greek Cup final of their 88-year history.

== Venue ==
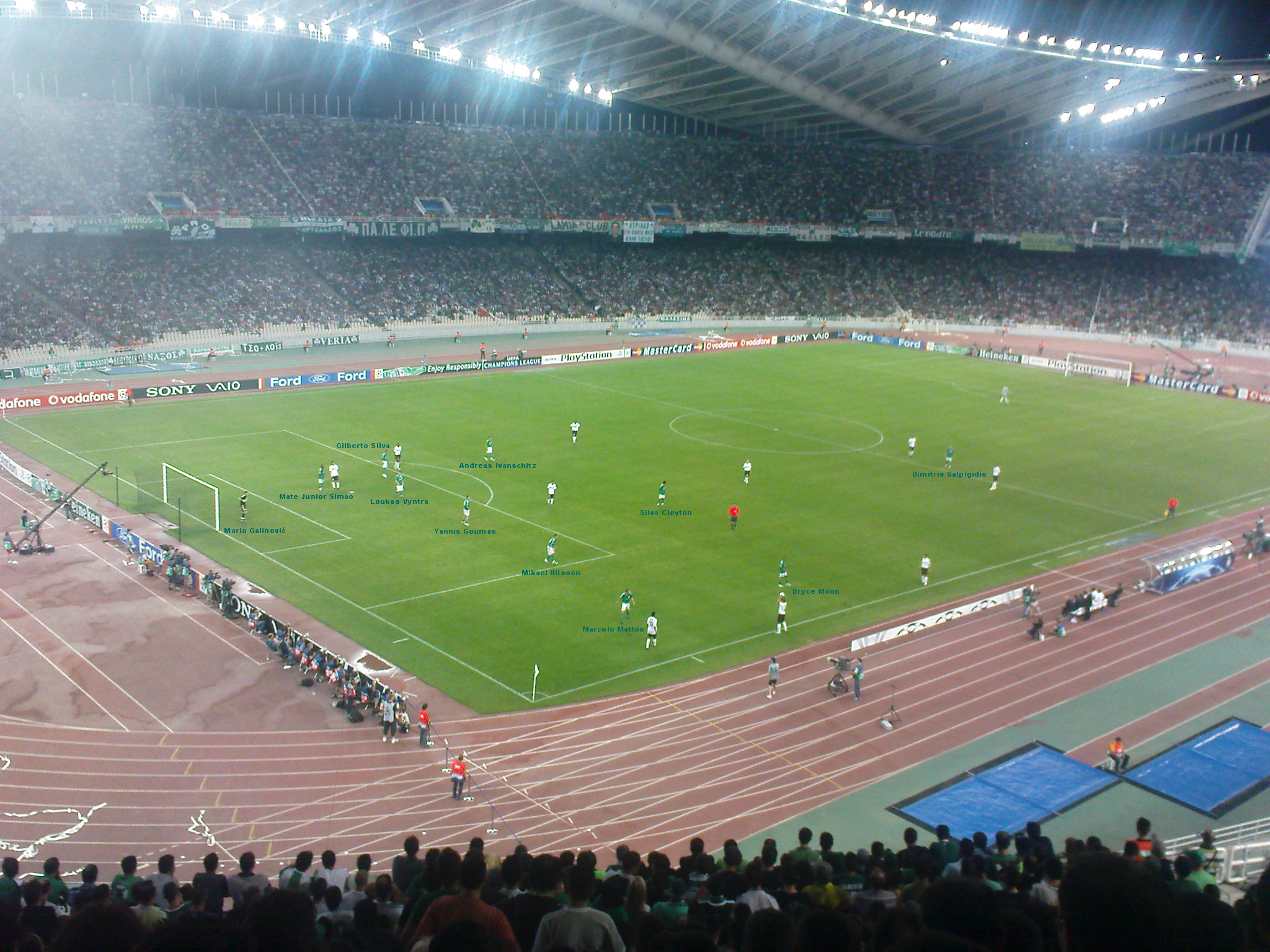
Athens Olympic Stadium.

This was the twenty first Greek Cup final held at the Athens Olympic Stadium, after the 1983, 1984, 1985, 1986, 1987, 1988, 1989, 1990, 1993, 1994, 1995, 1996, 1999, 2000, 2002, 2009, 2010, 2011, 2012 and 2013 finals.

The Athens Olympic Stadium was built in 1982 and renovated once in 2004. The stadium is used as a venue for AEK Athens and was used for Olympiacos, Panathinaikos and Greece on various occasions. Its current capacity is 69,618 and it hosted three European Cup/UEFA Champions League finals in 1983, 1994 and 2007, a UEFA Cup Winners' Cup final in 1987, the 1991 Mediterranean Games and the 2004 Summer Olympics.

== Background ==
Panathinaikos had reached the Greek Cup final twenty eight times, winning seventeen of them. The last time that they had played in a final was in 2010, where they had won Aris by 1–0.

PAOK had reached the Greek Cup final sixteen times, winning four of them. The last time that they had played in a final was in 2003, where they had won Aris by 1–0.

The two teams had met each other in a Cup final three times in the 1955, 1972 and 1977 finals.

== Route to the final ==
Panathinaikos				Round	PAOK			
Opponent	Agg.	1st leg	2nd leg		Opponent	Agg.	1st leg	2nd leg
Ergotelis	3–1	2–1 (H)	1–0 (A)	Round of 32	Anagennisi Karditsa	4–0	3–0 (H)	1–0 (A)
Iraklis Psachna	4–0	3–0 (H)	1–0 (A)	Round of 16	Iraklis	6–1	1–0 (A)	5–1 (H)
Olympiacos Volos	4–1	4–0 (H)	0–1 (A)	Quarter-finals	Apollon Smyrnis	6–0	3–0 (H)	3–0 (A)
OFI	3–1	0–1 (A)	3–0 (a.e.t.) (H)	Semi-finals	Olympiacos	2–2 (a)	1–2 (A)	1–0 (H)

== Match ==
=== Details ===
26 April 2014
20:00 EEST

Panathinaikos	4–1	PAOK
Berg 15', 50', 88'; Karelis 54'	Report	Vukić 70' (pen.)

Athens Olympic Stadium, Marousi
Attendance: 44,356
Referee: Anastassios Kakos (Corfu)

Panathinaikos	PAOK

GK	25	(Greece) Stefanos Kotsolis
RB	5	(Greece) Konstantinos Triantafyllopoulos
CB	23	(Croatia) Gordon Schildenfeld
CB	4	(Greece) Georgios Koutroumpis	(yellow card) 20'
LB	21	(Spain) Nano
DM	6	(Netherlands) David Mendes da Silva
CM	10	(Portugal) (Greece) Zeca (c)	(yellow card) 60'
CM	32	(Croatia) Danijel Pranjić
AM	20	(Algeria) Mehdi Abeid		(substituted off) 75'
SS	19	(Greece) Nikos Karelis	(yellow card) 54'	(substituted off) 71'
CF	9	(Sweden) Marcus Berg	(yellow card) 88'	(substituted off) 89'
Substitutes:
GK	1	(Greece) Stefanos Kapino
DF	3	(Greece) Diamantis Chouchoumis
MF	18	(Greece) Christos Donis
MF	8	(Greece) Anastasios Lagos		(substituted on) 75'
FW	14	(Nigeria) Abdul Ajagun		(substituted on) 71'
FW	7	(Belgium) (Greece) Victor Klonaridis
FW	33	(Croatia) Mladen Petrić		(substituted on) 89'
Manager:
(Greece) Yannis Anastasiou

GK	71	(Greece) Panagiotis Glykos
RB	2	(Greece) Giannis Skondras		(substituted off) 77'
CB	15	(Portugal) Miguel Vítor
CB	29	(Argentina) Juan Insaurralde
LB	3	(Greece) Georgios Tzavellas
DM	26	(Albania) Ergys Kaçe	(yellow card) 18'
CM	70	(Greece) Stelios Kitsiou
CM	25	(Romania) Costin Lazăr		(substituted off) 55'
RW	10	(Spain) Lucas Pérez		(substituted off) 55'
LW	11	(Slovakia) Miroslav Stoch
CF	14	(Greece) Dimitris Salpingidis (c)
Substitutes:
GK	50	(Greece) Asterios Giakoumis
DF	16	(Brazil) Lino		(substituted on) 55'
DF	21	(Greece) Nikos Spyropoulos
MF	77	(Greece) Sotiris Ninis
MF	9	(Serbia) Zvonimir Vukić		(substituted on) 55'
FW	20	(Netherlands) Danny Hoesen
FW	18	(Greece) Efthymis Koulouris		(substituted on) 77'
Manager:
(Greece) Giorgos Georgiadis

Man of the Match:
(Sweden) Marcus Berg (Panathinaikos)

Assistant referees:
Michalis Karsiotis (Corinthia)
Damianos Efthimiadis (Pieria)
Additional assistant referees:
Anastasios Sidiropoulos (Dodecanese)
Andreas Pappas (Athens)
Fourth official:
Stavros Tritsonis (Athens)

Match rules

- 90 minutes
- 30 minutes of extra time if necessary
- Penalty shootout if scores still level
- Seven named substitutes
- Maximum of three substitutions
