= 2016 Greek Football Cup final =

2016 Greek Cup final
- Event: 2015–16 Greek Football Cup
Olympiacos	AEK Athens
1	2
- Date: 17 May 2016
- Venue: Olympic Stadium, Marousi, Athens
- Man of the Match: Petros Mantalos (AEK Athens)
- Referee: Anastasios Sidiropoulos (Dodecanese)
- Attendance: Behind closed doors
- Weather: Fair; 18 °C (64 °F); 64% humidity

The 2016 Greek Cup final was the 72nd final of the Greek Cup. It took place on 17 May 2016 at the Olympic Stadium. The contesting teams were Olympiacos and AEK Athens. It was Olympiacos' thirty ninth Greek Cup final and second consecutive, in their 91 years of existence and AEK Athens' twenty first Greek Cup final of their 92-year history. On 5 April 2016, FIFA Emergency Committee decided to provide the Greek authorities with a deadline to have the cancellation of the competition reversed before 15 April 2016 or the HFF would face an automatic suspension. The Greek authorities announced on deadline day that the Greek Football Cup will be resumed after an agreement reached with FIFA, UEFA and HFF. A new schedule with the remaining match was announced with the final being played on 7 May 2016, but the final was later postponed to 15 May 2016. It was again postponed to 17 May 2016.

== Venue ==
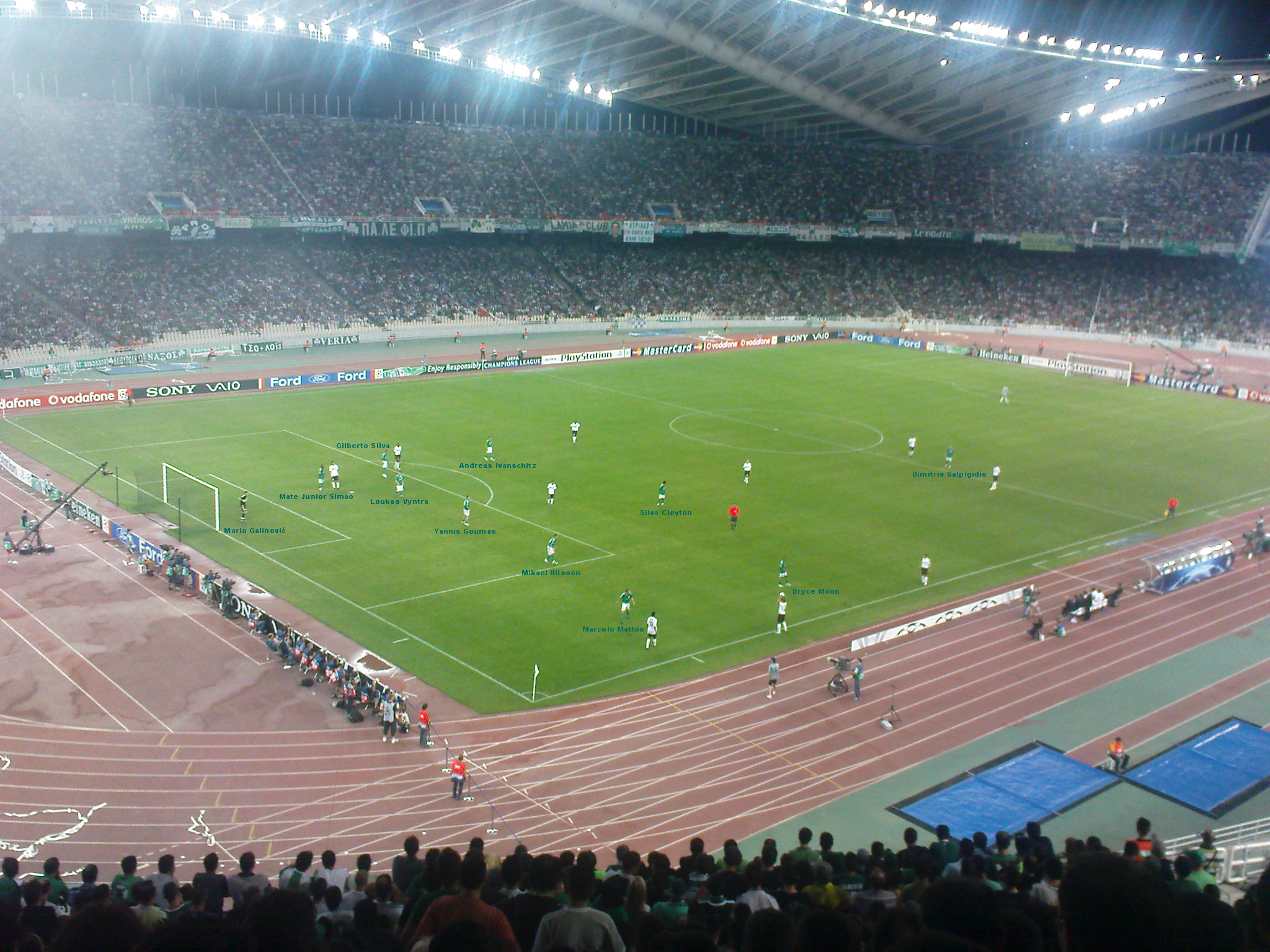
Athens Olympic Stadium.

This was the twenty second Greek Cup final held at the Athens Olympic Stadium, after the 1983, 1984, 1985, 1986, 1987, 1988, 1989, 1990, 1993, 1994, 1995, 1996, 1999, 2000, 2002, 2009, 2010, 2011, 2012, 2013, 2014 and 2015 finals.

The Athens Olympic Stadium was built in 1982 and renovated once in 2004. The stadium is used as a venue for AEK Athens and was used for Olympiacos, Panathinaikos and Greece on various occasions. Its current capacity is 69,618 and it hosted three European Cup/UEFA Champions League finals in 1983, 1994 and 2007, a UEFA Cup Winners' Cup final in 1987, the 1991 Mediterranean Games and the 2004 Summer Olympics.

== Background ==
Olympiacos had reached the Greek Cup final thirty eight times, winning twenty seven of them. The last time that they had played in a final was in 2015, where they had won against Skoda Xanthi by 3–1.

AEK Athens had reached the Greek Cup final twenty times, winning thirteen of them. The last time that they had played in a final was in 2011, where they had won against Atromitos by 3–0.

The two teams had met each other in a Cup final five times in the 1953, 1956, 2002, 2006 and 2009 finals.

== Route to the final ==
Olympiacos				Round	AEK Athens			
Opponent	Result			Group stage	Opponent	Result		
Platanias	2–2 (H)			Matchday 1	Skoda Xanthi	1–0 (A)		
Panegialios	4–0 (A)			Matchday 2	Panelefsiniakos	6–0 (H)		
Apollon Smyrnis	2–1 (A)			Matchday 3	AEL	5–0 (A)		
Group E winners: Pos / Team / Pld / Pts; 1 / Olympiacos / 3 / 7; 2 / Platanias / 3 / 4; 3 / Apollon Smyrnis / 3 / 3; 4 / Panegialios / 3 / 3; Source: epo.gr				Final standings	Group G winners: Pos / Team / Pld / Pts; 1 / AEK Athens / 3 / 9; 2 / AEL / 3 / 6; 3 / Skoda Xanthi / 3 / 3; 4 / Panelefsiniakos / 3 / 0; Source: epo.gr			
Opponent	Agg.	1st leg	2nd leg	Knockout phase	Opponent	Agg.	1st leg	2nd leg
Chania	10–1	4–1 (A)	6–0 (H)	Round of 16	Levadiakos	3–0	1–0 (A)	2–0 (H)
Asteras Tripolis	6–1	5–0 (A)	1–1 (H)	Quarter-finals	Iraklis	5–1	4–1 (H)	1–0 (A)
PAOK	6–0	3–0 (w/o) (A)	3–0 (w/o) (H)	Semi-finals	Atromitos	2–1	1–0 (H)	1–1 (A)

== Match ==
=== Details ===
17 May 2016
20:30 EEST

Olympiacos	1–2	AEK Athens
Domínguez 84'	Report	Mantalos 38'; Djebbour 51'

Olympic Stadium, Marousi
Attendance: Behind closed doors
Referee: Anastasios Sidiropoulos (Dodecanese)

Οlympiacos	AEK Athens

GK	16	(Spain) Roberto
RB	30	(Brazil) Leandro Salino
CB	3	(Spain) Alberto Botía	(yellow card) 77'
CB	6	(Morocco) Manuel da Costa
LB	26	(Democratic Republic of the Congo) Arthur Masuaku
DM	5	(Serbia) Luka Milivojević	(yellow card) 32'
CM	11	(Switzerland) Pajtim Kasami		(substituted off) 53'
RM	19	(Spain) David Fuster (c)		(substituted off) 65'
LM	77	(Portugal) Hernâni		(substituted off) 53'
AM	7	(Greece) Kostas Fortounis
CF	17	(Mexico) Alan Pulido
Substitutes:
GK	48	(Greece) Dimitrios Katsimitros
DF	23	(Greece) Dimitris Siovas
DF	41	(Greece) Kostas Tsimikas
MF	91	(Argentina) Esteban Cambiasso
MF	10	(Argentina) Chori Domínguez		(substituted on) 65'
FW	90	(Colombia) Felipe Pardo		(substituted on) 53'
FW	99	(Nigeria) Brown Ideye		(substituted on) 53'
Manager:
(Portugal) Marco Silva

GK	22	(Greece) Giannis Anestis
RB	12	(Brazil) Rodrigo Galo
CB	4	(Spain) César Arzo
CB	26	(Greece) Dimitrios Kolovetsios
LB	23	(Spain) Dídac Vilà	(yellow card) 62'
DM	8	(Portugal) André Simões	(yellow card) 41'
CM	18	(Sweden) Jakob Johansson
CM	20	(Greece) Petros Mantalos (c)		(substituted off) 81'
RW	21	(Greece) Christos Aravidis	(yellow card) 43'	(substituted off) 90+1'
LW	9	(Venezuela) Ronald Vargas		(substituted off) 58'
CF	19	(Algeria) Rafik Djebbour
Substitutes:
GK	13	(Greece) Panagiotis Dounis
DF	5	(Greece) Vasilios Lampropoulos
DF	27	(Greece) Michalis Bakakis	(yellow card) 90+5'	(substituted on) 58'
DF	55	(Greece) Adam Tzanetopoulos		(substituted on) 81'
MF	25	(Greece) Konstantinos Galanopoulos
MF	30	(Argentina) Diego Buonanotte
FW	14	(Czech Republic) Tomáš Pekhart		(substituted on) 90+1'
Manager:
(Greece) Stelios Manolas

Man of the Match:
(Greece) Petros Mantalos (AEK Athens)

Assistant referees:
Damianos Efthimiadis (Pieria)
Polychronis Kostaras (Aetoloacarnania)
Additional assistant referees:
Michael Koukoulakis (Heraklion)
Alexandros Aretopoulos (Trikala)
Fourth official:
Tryfon Petropoulos (Arcadia)

Match rules

- 90 minutes
- 30 minutes of extra time if necessary
- Penalty shootout if scores still level
- Seven named substitutes
- Maximum of three substitutions
