= 2014–15 AEK Athens F.C. season =

AEK Athens
2014–15 season
- Chairman: Alexis Alexiou (until 17 July); Evangelos Aslanidis
- Manager: Traianos Dellas
- Stadium: Athens Olympic Stadium
- Football League: 1st
- Greek Cup: Quarter-finals
- Top goalscorer: League: Christos Aravidis (17); All: Christos Aravidis (20)
- Highest home attendance: 64,256 (vs Olympiacos) (11 March 2015)
- Lowest home attendance: 1,803 (vs Olympiacos Volos) (20 May 2015)
- Average home league attendance: 6,410
- Biggest win: AEK Athens 7–0 Episkopi
- Biggest defeat: AEK Athens 0–3 Olympiacos (w/o)
| Home colours | Away colours |

The 2014–15 season was the 91st season in the existence of AEK Athens F.C. and the first in the second tier of Greek football. They competed in the Football League and the Greek Cup. The season began on 29 August 2014 and finished on 10 June 2015.

== Kits ==
Supplier: Puma
Sponsor(s): Jeep
Features: Fujitsu

| Home | Away |

== Overview ==
Having been promoted to the second division of Greek football, AEK needed to win yet another promotion in order to return to the normal division for this and to end the unhappy period of the smaller divisions. Quite a few additions on the roster with Petros Mantalos the standing out, as well as Hélder Barbosa. During the winter transfer window, AEK made a particularly successful transfer, that of Jakob Johansson, who proved to be a tremendously useful tool in the midfield. The season started with a delay due to a protest by the second division teams, except AEK, which they demanded more money from OPAP. Due to the delay in the start of the championship, AEK played many friendly games, the most important of which was against Roma and Panathinaikos.

AEK started the league sluggishly, however without facing any point losses, with their opponents playing harsh against them, unable to fill the gap in quality of the rosters. After a few matches, the course of AEK became easier, with victories coming easily and the team occasionally playing good football. With the exception of 2 away matches where they drew, the team won all of their matches finishing first in their group. The play-offs that year between the top three teams of each group, forced AEK to compete until June, without any interest since essentially everything had already been decided by the normal duration of the championship. AEK and Iraklis easily won the promotion to the first division with the yellow-blacks finishing first in the standings. Thus, AEK finally finished their big return in Greece's top division.

AEK, after a year of absence, returned to the Greek Cup, starting from the preliminary round where they faced Fokikos, who they eliminated with 2 wins. Then they participated in the group stage, where they were placed with 2 first division teams, Atromitos and Panthrakikos, as well as Iraklis Psachna. With 2 wins and 1 draw, AEK advanced to the round of 16 as first. The next opponent was Kerkyra, who were also a first division team and after the 1–1 draw away from home, AEK prevailed with 2–0 at Olympic Stadium to face Olympiacos in the next round. In the first match at Karaiskakis Stadium, AEK were better and made the 0–1 with Olympiacos unable to react and with questionable fouls, brought their players into the area of AEK and made it 1–1. Nothing changed after that, with AEK being more pressing and dominating the midfield, with some of their clean attacks being ruled offside. In the rematch on 11 March, the Olympic Stadium was full with fans of the yellow-black and AEK were having the match under control at 0–0, but after the serious injury of Mantalos, they gave Olympiacos space to press and in the last minutes of the game, with a controversial goal, made the score 0–1 and the coach of Olympiacos, Pereira and Kasami, moved towards the stands making obscene gestures. A few ultras of AEK invaded for seconds and the match was interrupeted and later awarded to Olympiacos with 0–3.

== Management team ==
| Position | Staff |
|---|---|
| Manager | (Greece) Traianos Dellas |
| Assistant manager | (Greece) Vasilios Borbokis |
| Goalkeeping coach | (Greece) Kostas Kampolis |
| Technical director | (Serbia) Branko Milovanović |
| Executive director | (Bosnia and Herzegovina) Dušan Bajević |
| Academy director | (Greece) Akis Zikos |
| U20 Manager | (Greece) Stelios Manolas |
| U17 Manager | (Greece) Angelos Chatzopoulos |
| Head of Scouting | (Greece) Michalis Kasapis |
| Head of Medical | (Greece) Lakis Nikolaou |

- Source: aekfc.gr

== Players ==
=== Squad information ===
NOTE: The players are the ones that have been announced by the AEK Athens' press release. No edits should be made unless a player arrival or exit is announced. Updated 10 June 2015, 23:59 UTC+3.

| No. | Player | Nat. | Position(s) | Date of birth (Age) | Signed | Previous club | Transfer fee | Contract until |
Goalkeepers
| 1 | Ilias Vouras | (Greece) | GK | 20 February 1988 (aged 27) | 2013 | (Greece) Niki Volos | Free | 2017 |
| 12 | Fotis Karagiolidis | (Greece) | GK | 28 August 1987 (aged 27) | 2013 | (Greece) Atromitos | Free | 2016 |
| 22 | Giannis Anestis | (Greece) | GK | 9 March 1991 (aged 24) | 2014 | (Greece) Panionios | Free | 2018 |
| 30 | Panagiotis Dounis | (Greece) | GK | 29 March 1997 (aged 18) | 2013 | (Greece) AEK Athens U20 | — | 2017 |
Defenders
| 2 | Aristidis Soiledis | (Greece) | LB / LM / LW | 8 February 1991 (aged 24) | 2014 | (Greece) Niki Volos | Free | 2017 |
| 3 | Stavros Petavrakis | (Greece) | LB / LM | 9 November 1992 (aged 22) | 2013 | (Greece) Fostiras | Free | 2017 |
| 5 | Vasilios Lampropoulos | (Greece) | CB / RB | 31 March 1990 (aged 25) | 2014 | (Greece) Panionios | Free | 2017 |
| 15 | Stratos Svarnas | (Greece) | CB / RB | 11 November 1997 (aged 17) | 2014 | (Greece) Triglia Rafinas | Free | 2017 |
| 26 | Dimitrios Kolovetsios | (Greece) | CB / RB | 16 October 1991 (aged 23) | 2014 | (Greece) PAS Giannina | €250,000 | 2017 |
| 27 | Michalis Bakakis | (Greece) | RB / LB / CB / RM | 18 March 1991 (aged 24) | 2014 | (Greece) Panetolikos | €250,000 | 2017 |
| 31 | Nikolaos Georgeas (Captain) | (Greece) | RB / LB / DM | 27 December 1976 (aged 38) | 2013 | (Greece) Veria | Free | 2015 |
| 55 | Adam Tzanetopoulos | (Greece) | CB / DM / CM | 10 February 1995 (aged 20) | 2013 | (Greece) Niki Volos | Free | 2016 |
| 89 | Georgios Sarris | (Greece) | CB / DM | 8 September 1989 (aged 25) | 2014 | (Greece) Ergotelis | Free | 2016 |
Midfielders
| 4 | Vasilios Rovas | (Greece) | DM / CM / CB / RB | 6 January 1984 (aged 31) | 2013 | (Greece) Apollon Smyrnis | Free | 2016 |
| 6 | Miguel Cordero (Vice-captain) | (Spain) | CM / DM | 10 September 1987 (aged 27) | 2012 | (Spain) Xerez | €70,000 | 2017 |
| 10 | Dimitrios Anakoglou (Vice-captain 2) | (Greece) | AM / CM / RM / LM | 6 September 1991 (aged 23) | 2013 | (Greece) Panserraikos | €50,000 | 2016 |
| 14 | Dimitrios Grontis | (Greece) | CM / AM / LM / RM / LW / RW | 21 August 1994 (aged 20) | 2012 | (Greece) AEK Athens U20 | — | 2016 |
| 18 | Jakob Johansson | (Sweden) | DM / CM / CB | 21 January 1990 (aged 25) | 2014 | (Sweden) Göteborg | Free | 2018 |
| 20 | Petros Mantalos | (Greece) | AM / LM / CM / LW / SS / RM / RW | 31 August 1991 (aged 23) | 2014 | (Greece) Skoda Xanthi | €500,000 | 2019 |
| 44 | Ablaye Faye | (Senegal) | DM / CM | 10 April 1994 (aged 21) | 2014 | (Greece) Kallithea | Free | 2017 |
Forwards
| 7 | Hélder Barbosa | (Portugal) | LW / LM / AM / RW / RM / SS | 25 May 1987 (aged 28) | 2014 | (Portugal) Braga | Free | 2017 |
| 8 | Alexandre D'Acol | (Brazil) (Italy) | ST / SS / LW / AM | 18 July 1986 (aged 28) | 2013 | (Greece) Kallithea | Free | 2015 |
| 9 | Ivan Brečević | (Croatia) | ST | 28 July 1987 (aged 27) | 2013 | (Slovenia) Koper | Free | 2016 |
| 11 | Vangelis Platellas (Vice-captain 3) | (Greece) | RW / RM / LM / LW / SS / AM | 1 December 1988 (aged 26) | 2013 | (Greece) Skoda Xanthi | Free | 2016 |
| 17 | Darko Zorić | (Montenegro) | SS / ST/ RW / LW / AM | 12 September 1993 (aged 21) | 2014 | (Montenegro) Čelik Nikšić | €150,000 | 2017 |
| 21 | Christos Aravidis | (Greece) | SS / ST / RW / LW / RM / LM | 13 March 1987 (aged 28) | 2014 | (Greece) Panionios | Free | 2017 |
| 23 | Markos Dounis | (Greece) | RW / LW / RM / LM | 9 May 1992 (aged 23) | 2014 | (Greece) Panionios | Free | 2017 |
| 99 | Macauley Chrisantus | (Nigeria) | ST/ SS / RW / LW | 20 August 1990 (aged 24) | 2015 | (Turkey) Sivasspor | Free | 2016 |
Left during Winter Transfer Window
| 16 | Vasilios Tsevas | (Greece) | ST / SS | 27 May 1995 (aged 20) | 2013 | (Greece) AEK Athens U20 | — | 2017 |

== Transfers ==
=== In ===
==== Summer ====
| No. | Pos. | Player | From | Fee | Date | Contract Until | Source |
|---|---|---|---|---|---|---|---|
| 2 | DF | (Greece) Aristidis Soiledis | (Greece) Niki Volos | Free transfer | 7 June 2014 | 30 June 2017 | |
| 5 | DF | (Greece) Vasilios Lampropoulos | (Greece) Panionios | Free transfer | 1 July 2014 | 30 June 2017 | |
| 7 | FW | (Portugal) Hélder Barbosa | (Portugal) Braga | Free transfer | 31 July 2014 | 30 June 2017 | |
| 15 | DF | (Greece) Stratos Svarnas | (Greece) Triglia Rafinas | Free transfer | 1 July 2014 | 30 June 2017 | |
| 17 | FW | (Montenegro) Darko Zorić | (Montenegro) Čelik Nikšić | €150,000 | 1 July 2014 | 30 June 2017 | |
| 20 | MF | (Greece) Petros Mantalos | (Greece) Skoda Xanthi | €500,000 | 1 July 2014 | 30 June 2019 | |
| 21 | FW | (Greece) Christos Aravidis | (Greece) Panionios | Free transfer | 1 July 2014 | 30 June 2017 | |
| 22 | GK | (Greece) Giannis Anestis | (Greece) Panionios | Free transfer | 1 July 2014 | 30 June 2018 | |
| 23 | FW | (Greece) Markos Dounis | (Greece) Panionios | Free transfer | 1 July 2014 | 30 June 2017 | |
| 26 | DF | (Greece) Dimitrios Kolovetsios | (Greece) PAS Giannina | €250,000 | 1 July 2014 | 30 June 2017 | |
| 27 | DF | (Greece) Michalis Bakakis | (Greece) Panetolikos | €250,000 | 1 July 2014 | 30 June 2017 | |
| 89 | DF | (Greece) Georgios Sarris | (Greece) Ergotelis | Free transfer | 1 July 2014 | 30 June 2016 | |
| 44 | MF | (Senegal) Ablaye Faye | (Greece) Kallithea | Loan return | 1 July 2014 | 30 June 2017 | |
| — | DF | (Greece) Christopher Duberet | (Greece) Peramaikos | Loan return | 1 July 2014 | 30 June 2017 | |
| — | DF | (Albania) Kledis Hereki | (Greece) Nea Ionia | Loan return | 1 July 2014 | 30 June 2017 | |
| — | MF | (Albania) Alexandros Dimgiokas | (Greece) Peramaikos | Loan return | 1 July 2014 | 30 June 2017 | |
| — | FW | (Albania) Flosard Malci | (Greece) A.O. Nea Ionia | Loan return | 1 July 2014 | 30 June 2017 | |

==== Winter ====
| No. | Pos. | Player | From | Fee | Date | Contract Until | Source |
|---|---|---|---|---|---|---|---|
| 18 | MF | (Sweden) Jakob Johansson | (Sweden) Göteborg | Free transfer | 28 December 2014 | 30 June 2018 | |
| 99 | FW | (Nigeria) Macauley Chrisantus | (Turkey) Sivasspor | Free transfer | 2 February 2015 | 30 June 2016 | |
| — | DF | (Greece) Nikolaos Argyriou | (Greece) Niki Volos | Loan termination | 31 December 2014 | 30 June 2017 | |

=== Out ===
==== Summer ====
| No. | Pos. | Player | To | Fee | Date | Source |
|---|---|---|---|---|---|---|
| — | DF | (Italy) Bruno Cirillo | (India) Pune City | End of contract | 21 August 2014 | |
| — | DF | (Greece) Stavros Stathakis | (Cyprus) Ayia Napa | Contract termination | 19 July 2014 | |
| — | DF | (Greece) Kostas Tsoupros | (Greece) Asteras Magoula | Contract termination | 18 September 2014 | |
| — | DF | (Greece) Sokratis Tsoukalas | (Greece) Fokikos | Contract termination | 12 September 2014 | |
| — | DF | (Greece) Anastasios Tsoumagas | (Greece) Panelefsiniakos | Contract termination | 10 September 2014 | |
| — | DF | (Albania) Kledis Hereki | (Greece) AO Nea Ionia | Contract termination | 1 August 2014 | |
| — | MF | (Cyprus) Fotis Kezos | (Cyprus) Othellos Athienou | Contract termination | 22 September 2014 | |
| — | MF | (Greece) Roberto Katsikas | (Greece) Mandraikos | Contract termination | 2 October 2014 | |
| — | MF | (Greece) Enias Kalogeris | (Greece) Panargiakos | Contract termination | 17 August 2014 | |
| — | FW | (Albania) Renaldo Rama | (Greece) Fostiras | Contract termination | 10 August 2014 | |
| — | FW | (Albania) Flosard Malci | (Greece) Glyfada | Contract termination | 1 July 2014 | |
| — | FW | (Greece) Tryfon Kazviropoulos | (Italy) Hellas Verona U19 | Contract termination | 18 July 2014 | |
| — | FW | (Croatia) Zdravko Popović | Free agent | Contract termination | 2 June 2014 | |
| — | FW | (Bosnia and Herzegovina) Edin Murga | (Denmark) Vendsyssel | Contract termination | 1 July 2014 | |

=== Loan out ===
==== Summer ====
| No. | Pos. | Player | To | Fee | Date | Until | Option to buy | Source |
|---|---|---|---|---|---|---|---|---|
| — | DF | (Greece) Christopher Duberet | (Greece) Triglia Rafinas | Free | 26 July 2014 | 30 June 2015 | ✗ | |
| — | DF | (Greece) Nikolaos Argyriou | (Greece) Niki Volos | Free | 4 July 2014 | 30 June 2015 | ✗ | |
| — | MF | (Serbia) Nikola Zivanović | (Greece) Anagennisi Ierapetras | Free | 25 July 2014 | 30 June 2015 | ✗ | |
| — | MF | (Albania) Alexandros Dimgiokas | (Greece) Nea Ionia | Free | 1 July 2014 | 30 June 2015 | ✗ | |
| — | FW | (Greece) Orestis Paliaroutas | (Greece) A.E. Kifisia | Free | 30 July 2014 | 30 June 2015 | ✗ | |
| — | FW | (Greece) Lampros Thanailakis | (Greece) Ilisiakos | Free | 25 July 2014 | 30 June 2015 | ✗ | |

==== Winter ====
| No. | Pos. | Player | To | Fee | Date | Until | Option to buy | Source |
|---|---|---|---|---|---|---|---|---|
| 16 | FW | (Greece) Vasilios Tsevas | (Greece) Iraklis Psachna | Free | 2 February 2015 | 30 June 2015 | ✗ | |
| — | DF | (Greece) Nikolaos Argyriou | (Greece) Episkopi | Free | 2 February 2015 | 30 June 2015 | ✗ | |

=== Contract renewals ===
| No. | Pos. | Player | Date | Former Exp. Date | New Exp. Date | Source |
|---|---|---|---|---|---|---|
| 31 | DF | (Greece) Nikolaos Georgeas | 25 June 2014 | 30 June 2014 | 30 June 2015 | |

=== Overall transfer activity ===
==== Expenditure ====
Summer: ▼€1,150,000

Winter: ▼€0

Total: ▼€1,150,000

==== Income ====
Summer: ▲€0

Winter: ▲€0

Total: ▲€0

==== Net Totals ====
Summer: ▼€1,150,000

Winter: €0

Total: ▼€1,150,000

== Pre-season and friendlies ==
| 2 August 2014 Friendly | Skoda Xanthi | 0–0 | AEK Athens | Xanthi |
| 18:45 EEST (UTC+3) | | Report | | Stadium: Skoda Xanthi Arena; Referee: Giannis Topouzis (Thrace) |

| 6 August 2014 Friendly | AEK Athens | 7–1 | Ilisiakos | Spata |
| 18:45 EEST (UTC+3) | Aravidis 8'; Lampropoulos 22'; Dounis 26'; Pararas 39' (o.g.); Mantalos 42'; Zorić 66'; Platellas 80' | Report | Amanatidis 50' | Stadium: Spata Training Centre; Attendance: Behind closed doors |

| 13 August 2014 Friendly | Diminio Volos | 0–5 | AEK Athens | Volos |
| 18:00 EEST (UTC+3) | | Report | Svarnas 19'; Brečević 26'; Barbosa 28'; D'Acol 73'; Aravidis 84' | Stadium: Diminio Stadium; Attendance: Behind closed doors Referee: Giannis Koustas (Thessaly) |

| 17 August 2014 Friendly | Niki Volos | 1–2 | AEK Athens | Volos |
| 19:00 EEST (UTC+3) | Shkurti 73' | Report | Aravidis 1'; Mantalos 34' (pen.) | Stadium: Panthessaliko Stadium; Referee: Manolis Skoulas (Thessaly) |

| 20 August 2014 Charity match | Rigas Feraios | 0–4 | AEK Athens | Velestino |
| 18:00 EEST (UTC+3) | | Report | Zorić 9'; Dounis 32'; Kolovetsios 39'; Barbosa 43' | Stadium: Velestino Stadium; Referee: Dimitiris Kritikos (Thessaly) |

| 23 August 2014 Friendly | AEK Athens | 1–2 | Roma | Marousi |
| 20:30 EEST (UTC+3) | D'Acol 85' (pen.) | Report | Iturbe 45+2'; Keita 52' | Stadium: Olympic Stadium; Attendance: 27,612; Referee: Andreas Pappas (Athens) |

| 6 September 2014 Friendly | AEK Athens | 4–0 | Apollon Kalamarias | Marousi |
| 18:00 EEST (UTC+3) | Aravidis 4'; Dounis 11'; D'Acol 70'; Brecevic 75' | Report | | Stadium: Olympic Stadium; Attendance: 1,216; Referee: Nikos Papageorgiou (Athens) |

| 17 September 2014 Friendly | AEL | 1–1 | AEK Athens | Larissa |
| 18:00 EEST (UTC+3) | Verdú 42'; Karanikas (yellow card) 73' | Report | Cordero (yellow card) 8'; Vlachomitros 55' | Stadium: AEL FC Arena; Referee: Thanasis Tzilos (Larissa) |

| 28 September 2014 Friendly | Lamia | 0–0 | AEK Athens | Lamia |
| 18:15 EEST (UTC+3) | | Report | | Stadium: Lamia Municipal Stadium; Referee: Giorgos Tzovaras (Phthiotis) |

| 7 October 2014 Friendly | Pierikos | 1–3 | AEK Athens | Katerini |
| 19:00 EEST (UTC+3) | Giannoulis 52' | Report | Platellas 2'; Dounis 14', 82' | Stadium: Municipal Stadium of Katerini; Referee: Panagiotis Papargyriou (Pieria) |

| 22 November 2014 Friendly | AEK Athens | 3–2 | Panathinaikos | Marousi |
| 15:00 EET (UTC+2) | Aravidis 27'; Platellas 34'; D'Acol 65' | Report | Donis 47'; Berisha 56' | Stadium: Olympic Stadium; Attendance: Behind closed doors |

| 17 April 2015 Friendly | AEK Athens | 3–2 | Kallithea | Spata |
| 17:00 EEST (UTC+3) | Aravidis; Barbosa; Chrisantus | Report | Arnarellis; Durmishaj | Stadium: Spata Training Centre; Attendance: Behind closed doors |

| 18 April 2015 Friendly | AEK Athens | 4–0 | Acharnaikos | Spata |
| 17:00 EEST (UTC+3) | Chrisantus 9', 39'; Dounis 20'; Anakoglou 78' | Report | | Stadium: Spata Training Centre; Attendance: Behind closed doors Referee: Nikos Papageorgiou (Athens) |

== Competitions ==
=== Overall record ===
| Competition | First match | Last match | Starting round | Final position | Record | | | | | | | |
| Competition | First match | Last match | Starting round | Final position | Pld | W | D | L | GF | GA | GD | Win % |
|---|---|---|---|---|---|---|---|---|---|---|---|---|
| Football League | 12 October 2014 | 5 April 2015 | Matchday 1 | Winners | 24 | 22 | 2 | 0 | 67 | 10 | +57 | 91.67 |
| Promotion Play-offs | 26 April 2015 | 10 June 2015 | Matchday 1 | Winners | 10 | 5 | 3 | 2 | 14 | 9 | +5 | 50.00 |
| Greek Cup | 29 August 2014 | 11 March 2015 | Preliminary round | Quarter-finals | 9 | 5 | 3 | 1 | 15 | 5 | +10 | 55.56 |
| Total | | | | | 43 | 32 | 8 | 3 | 96 | 24 | +72 | 74.42 |

Last updated: 10 June 2015
Source: Competitions

=== Football League ===
==== South Group League Table ====
| Pos | Team | Pld | W | D | L | GF | GA | GD | Pts | Qualification or relegation |
|---|---|---|---|---|---|---|---|---|---|---|
| 1 | AEK Athens (Note: AEK Athens were deducted 3 points due to extreme fan behavior.) (Q) | 24 | 22 | 2 | 0 | 67 | 10 | +57 | 65 | Qualification to promotion play-offs |
| 2 | Panachaiki (Q) | 24 | 14 | 4 | 6 | 41 | 22 | +19 | 46 | Qualification to promotion play-offs |
| 3 | Apollon Smyrnis (Q) | 24 | 13 | 6 | 5 | 32 | 17 | +15 | 45 | Qualification to promotion play-offs |
| 4 | Chania | 24 | 12 | 6 | 6 | 28 | 20 | +8 | 42 | |
| 5 | Enosi Ermionida (Q) | 24 | 12 | 5 | 7 | 30 | 28 | +2 | 41 | Qualification to relegation play-offs |

Source: Football League
Rules for classification: 1) points, 2) head-to-head points
(Q) Qualified for the phase indicated

===== Results summary =====
| Overall | | | | | | | | Home | | | | | | Away | | | | | |
| Pld | W | D | L | GF | GA | GD | Pts | W | D | L | GF | GA | GD | W | D | L | GF | GA | GD |
|---|---|---|---|---|---|---|---|---|---|---|---|---|---|---|---|---|---|---|---|
| 24 | 22 | 2 | 0 | 67 | 10 | +57 | 68 | 12 | 0 | 0 | 44 | 5 | +39 | 10 | 2 | 0 | 23 | 5 | +18 |

Last updated: 2015-04-05.
Source: aekfc.gr

===== Results by Matchday =====
| Round | 1 | 2 | 3 | 4 | 5 | 6 | 7 | 8 | 9 | 10 | 11 | 12 | 13 | 14 | 15 | 16 | 17 | 18 | 19 | 20 | 21 | 22 | 23 | 24 |
|---|---|---|---|---|---|---|---|---|---|---|---|---|---|---|---|---|---|---|---|---|---|---|---|---|
| Ground | A | H | A | A | A | H | A | H | H | A | H | A | H | A | H | H | H | A | H | A | A | H | A | H |
| Result | W | W | W | W | W | W | D | W | W | W | W | W | W | D | W | W | W | W | W | W | W | W | W | W |
| Position | 1 | 1 | 1 | 1 | 1 | 1 | 1 | 1 | 1 | 1 | 1 | 1 | 1 | 1 | 1 | 1 | 1 | 1 | 1 | 1 | 1 | 1 | 1 | 1 |

Updated to match(es) played on 5 April 2015. Source: Competitive matches
A = Away; H = Home; W = Win; D = Draw; L = Loss; P = Postponed

===== Matches =====
| 12 October 2014 1 | Panegialios | 0–1 | AEK Athens | Aigio |
| 18:00 EEST (UTC+3) | Nastos (yellow card) 16'; Spinoulas (yellow card) 35'; Tsatsaris (yellow card) 40'; Gotsoulias (yellow card) 90'; Tzimogiannis (yellow card) 90+2' | Report | Aravidis 21', (yellow card) 87' (yellow-red card) 88'; Cordero (yellow card) 27'; Anakoglou (yellow card) 81' | Stadium: Aigio Stadium; Attendance: 7,000; Referee: Evangelos Gratsanis (Trikala); Man of the Match: Vasilios Lampropoulos |

| 19 October 2014 2 | AEK Athens | 2–1 | Apollon Smyrnis | Marousi |
| 18:00 EEST (UTC+3) | Cordero (yellow card) 42'; Lampropoulos (yellow card) 45+1'; D'Acol 62'; Mantalos (yellow card) 62', (goal) 85' (pen.); Petavrakis (yellow card) 69' | Report | Chatzizisis (yellow card) 38'; Wanderson (yellow card) 41' (yellow-red card) 53'; González 45+2' (pen.); Chatzis (yellow card) 42'; Kyriakos (yellow card) 61'; Iraklis (yellow card) 78'; Kyrgias (yellow card) 84' | Stadium: Olympic Stadium; Attendance: 19,385; Referee: Spyros Selimos (Laconia); Man of the Match: Petros Mantalos |

| 24 October 2014 3 | Chania | 0–2 | AEK Athens | Chania |
| 18:00 EEST (UTC+3) | Goumas (yellow card) 12'; Siligardakis (yellow card) 40'; Kaminiotis (yellow card) 60'; Manolas (yellow card) 85' | Report | Georgeas (yellow card) 62'; Lampropoulos (yellow card) 71'; Mantalos 75', (yellow card) 79'; Kolovetsios 86' | Stadium: Perivolia Municipal Stadium; Attendance: 3,000; Referee: Konstantinos Karyofilis (Piraeus); Man of the Match: Petros Mantalos |

| 2 November 2014 4 | Acharnaikos | 1–2 | AEK Athens | Acharnes |
| 15:00 EET (UTC+2) | Iordanidis (yellow card) 23'; Jesić 26', (yellow card) 39'; Athanasiou (yellow card) 38'; Zonas (yellow card) 65'; Stournaras (yellow card) 82'; Kalamiotis (yellow card) 84'; Manousakis (yellow card) 88' | Report | Barbosa (yellow card) 45+4'; Mantalos (yellow card) 71'; Zorić (yellow card) 79'; D'Acol 90+2'; Brečević 90+6' | Stadium: Acharnes Stadium; Attendance: 5,000; Referee: Stylianos Fotis (Euboea); Man of the Match: Ivan Brečević |

| 9 November 2014 5 | Day off |

| 30 November 2014 6 | Panachaiki | 1–3 | AEK Athens | Patras |
| 18:00 EET (UTC+2) | Balu (yellow card) 2'; Stergidis (yellow card) 5'; Gadiaga 80'; Kargas (yellow card) 81'; Da Costa (yellow card) 88' | Report | D'Acol 3' (pen.); Kolovetsios (yellow card) 11'; Cordero (yellow card) 30'; Platellas 31'; Petavrakis (yellow card) 49'; Barbosa 90' | Stadium: Kostas Davourlis Stadium; Attendance: 5,000; Referee: Giorgos Tzovaras (Phthiotis); Man of the Match: Miguel Cordero |

| 7 December 2014 7 | AEK Athens | 7–0 | Episkopi | Marousi |
| 18:00 EET (UTC+2) | Mantalos 12', 39', 82' (pen.); Brečević 22', 75'; Barbosa 24'; Platellas 57' | Report | Pitharoulis (yellow card) 36'; Nikoltsis (yellow card) 89'; Doumanis (yellow card) 90' | Stadium: Olympic Stadium; Attendance: 7,951; Referee: Nikos Roussos–Bekertzis (Preveza); Man of the Match: Petros Mantalos |

| 14 December 2014 8 | Ermionida | 0–0 | AEK Athens | Kranidi |
| 15:00 EET (UTC+2) | Omo (yellow card) 24'; Kolokas (yellow card) 35' | Report | Lampropoulos (yellow card) 30'; Cordero (yellow card) 90+1' | Stadium: Municipal Stadium of Kranidi; Attendance: 1,500; Referee: Aristotelis Diamantopoulos (Arcadia); Man of the Match: Georgios Kiosses |

| 17 December 2014 9 | AEK Athens | 4–0 | Fostiras | Marousi |
| 18:00 EET (UTC+2) | Zorić (yellow card) 7'; Faye (yellow card) 26'; Platellas 30', 78'; Aravidis (yellow card) 61'; Mantalos 72' (pen.); Dounis 82' | Report | Sakellariou (yellow card) 10'; Mendy (yellow card) 46'; Moustogiannis (yellow card) 51' (yellow-red card) 58'; Tegousis (yellow card) 71' | Stadium: Olympic Stadium; Attendance: 3,429; Referee: Nikolaos Papageorgiou (Athens); Man of the Match: Vangelis Platellas |

| 21 December 2014 10 | AEK Athens | 5–1 | Iraklis Psachnon | Marousi |
| 18:00 EET (UTC+2) | Brečević 3', 76'; Platellas 5', (yellow card) 65'; Dounis 40', (yellow card) 68'; Lampropoulos 83' | Report | Bakomitros 64'; Warden (yellow card) 68' | Stadium: Olympic Stadium; Attendance: 8,160; Referee: Vasilios Panagiotopoulos (Aetoloacarnania); Man of the Match: Petros Mantalos |

| 4 January 2015 11 | Paniliakos | 0–3 (Awarded) | AEK Athens | Pyrgos |
| 15:00 EET (UTC+2) | | | | Stadium: Pyrgos Municipal Stadium |
Note: Paniliakos withdrew from the championship and lost all of their remaining matches by 3–0 without a match.

| 11 January 2015 12 | AEK Athens | 5–1 | Kallithea | Marousi |
| 18:00 EET (UTC+2) | Aravidis 6'; Brečević 11', 39', 48'; Dounis 65' | Report | Piccolo (yellow card) 11' (yellow-red card) 54'; Durmishaj 47'; Pagonis (yellow card) 58'; Machado (yellow card) 80' | Stadium: Olympic Stadium; Attendance: 10,151; Referee: Nikolaos Poulimas (Corfu); Man of the Match: Ivan Brečević |

| 18 January 2015 13 | Alimos | 0–1 | AEK Athens | Kaisariani |
| 18:00 EET (UTC+2) | Nikolopoulos (yellow card) 32' (yellow-red card) 67'; Gavriil (yellow card) 42'; Pantelis (yellow card) 54'; Saganas (yellow card) 66'; Vlacho (yellow card) 69'; Karameris (yellow card) 90' | Report | Tzanetopoulos (yellow card) 77'; Mantalos (penalty missed) 68'; Aravidis 90+1' (pen.) | Stadium: Michalis Kritikopoulos Stadium; Attendance: 3,000; Referee: Evangelos Kardolaimis (East Attica); Man of the Match: Ivan Brečević |

| 26 January 2015 14 | AEK Athens | 3–0 | Panegialios | Marousi |
| 18:00 EET (UTC+2) | Aravidis 40', 65', 86'; Lampropoulos (yellow card) 73' | Report | Ioannou (yellow card) 20'; Spinoulas (yellow card) 89'; Hurtado (yellow card) 90+3' | Stadium: Olympic Stadium; Attendance: 3,724; Referee: Andreas Karaliolios (Grevena); Man of the Match: Christos Aravidis |

| 2 February 2015 15 | Apollon Smyrnis | 1–1 | AEK Athens | Rizoupoli |
| 18:00 EET (UTC+2) | Iraklis (yellow card) 13'; Kotsonis 28', (yellow card) 74'; Farinola (yellow card) 39'; Pitkas (yellow card) 45'; Lagos (yellow card) 45+2'; Karademitros (yellow card) 63'; Chatzizisis (yellow card) 71'; Wanderson (yellow card) 90+3'; Golias (yellow card) 90+5' | Report | Platellas (yellow card) 13' (yellow-red card) 23'; Mantalos (yellow card) 42' (yellow-red card) 87', (goal) 81' (pen.); Barbosa (yellow card) 53'; Lampropoulos (yellow card) 90+2' | Stadium: Georgios Kamaras Stadium; Attendance: 8,000; Referee: Ananias Fotiadis (Serres); Man of the Match: Giannis Anestis |

| 8 February 2015 16 | AEK Athens | 4–1 | Chania | Marousi |
| 18:00 EET (UTC+2) | Anakoglou 13', 52'; Lampropoulos 29'; Sarris (yellow card) 44'; Brečević (yellow card) 45+1'; Barbosa (yellow card) 62'; Aravidis 82' | Report | Pangalos 36' (pen.), (yellow card) 87'; Kritikos (yellow card) 45+1'; Konteon (yellow card) 47'; Goumas (yellow card) 90' | Stadium: Olympic Stadium; Attendance: 6,112; Referee: Evanngelos Kiotzenis (Xanthi); Man of the Match: Dimitrios Anakoglou |

| 15 February 2015 17 | AEK Athens | 2–0 | Acharnaikos | Marousi |
| 18:00 EET (UTC+2) | Barbosa 38'; Aravidis 78' | Report | Ioannidis (yellow card) 20'; Iordanidis (yellow card) 73'; Kalogeropoulos (yellow card) 78'; Papotolios (yellow card) 86'; Jesić (yellow card) 86'; Niaros (yellow card) 89'; Zonas (yellow card) 89' | Stadium: Olympic Stadium; Attendance: 6,762; Referee: Panagiotis Simeonidis (Pieria); Man of the Match: Dimitrios Anakoglou |

| 21 February 2015 18 | Day off |

| 25 February 2015 19 | AEK Athens | 2–1 | Panachaiki | Marousi |
| 18:00 EET (UTC+2) | Platellas 35'; Barbosa (yellow card) 67'; Mantalos 86' | Report | Asigba (yellow card) 9'; Kargas (yellow card) 24'; Georgakopoulos (yellow card) 89'; Albi (yellow card) 90'; Kyvelidis 90+2' | Stadium: Olympic Stadium; Attendance: 5,522; Referee: Giorgos Foukakis (Heraklion); Man of the Match: Jakob Johansson |

| 1 March 2015 20 | Episkopi | 0–2 | AEK Athens | Rethymno |
| 15:00 EET (UTC+2) | Pytharoulis (yellow card) 27'; Delibasis (yellow card) 37'; Vourvachakis (yellow card) 60'; Villafañe (yellow card) 90+1'; Manousakis (yellow card) 90+3' | Report | Aravidis 2', 77' | Stadium: Gallos Stadium; Attendance: 1,000; Referee: Giannis Papadopoulos (Macedonia); Man of the Match: Christos Aravidis |

| 7 March 2015 21 | AEK Athens | 4–0 | Ermionida | Marousi |
| 18:30 EET (UTC+2) | Georgeas (yellow card) 26'; Anakoglou 36'; Dounis 42', (yellow card) 85'; Aravidis 64'; D'Acol 90+2' | Report | Papanikolaou (yellow card) 35'; Tapé (yellow card) 45' | Stadium: Olympic Stadium; Attendance: 6,132; Referee: Georgios Michailidis (Boeotia); Man of the Match: Dimitrios Anakoglou |

| 15 March 2015 22 | Fostiras | 1–3 | AEK Athens | Tavros |
| 18:00 EET (UTC+2) | Beleris 4'; Gacesa (yellow card) 75'; Siopis (yellow card) 87'; Acheimastos (yellow card) 88' | Report | Johansson 17'; Kolovetsios (yellow card) 32'; Platellas 36'; Chrisantus (yellow card) 70'; Zorić 80'; Petavrakis (yellow card) 88' | Stadium: Spyros Gialabidis Stadium; Attendance: 1,000; Referee: Nikos Ratsiatos (Argolida); Man of the Match: Christos Aravidis |

| 18 March 2015 23 | Iraklis Psachna | 1–3 | AEK Athens | Psachna |
| 18:00 EET (UTC+2) | Travieso (penalty missed) 54'; Patsatzoglou 70' | Report | Zorić (yellow card) 30', (goal) 56'; Aravidis 42', 65'; Anestis (yellow card) 50' | Stadium: Psachna Municipal Stadium; Attendance: 1,500; Referee: Manolis Skoulas (Thessaly); Man of the Match: Christos Aravidis |

| 22 March 2015 24 | AEK Athens | 3–0 (Awarded) | Paniliakos | Marousi |
| 15:00 EET (UTC+2) | | | | Stadium: Olympic Stadium |
Note: Paniliakos withdrew from the championship and lost all of their remaining matches by 3–0 without a match.

| 29 March 2015 25 | Kallithea | 0–2 | AEK Athens | Tavros |
| 15:00 EEST (UTC+3) | Tsonis (yellow card) 52'; Fragkos (yellow card) 74'; Pagonis (yellow card) 85'; Katsikogiannis (yellow card) 86'; Tegousis (yellow card) 87'; Giannitsis (yellow card) 87' | Report | Dounis 31'; Rovas (yellow card) 44'; Chrisantus 48'; Sarris (yellow card) 90+3' | Stadium: Spyros Gialabidis Stadium; Attendance: 500; Referee: Athanasios Sezos (Kilkis); Man of the Match: Markos Dounis |

| 5 April 2015 26 | AEK Athens | 3–0 | Alimos | Marousi |
| 15:00 EEST (UTC+3) | Chrisantus 10', 47'; Zorić 90' | Report | Bong (yellow card) 31'; Pantelis (yellow card) 33' (yellow-red card) 90+2'; Alex (yellow card) 44' | Stadium: Olympic Stadium; Attendance: Behind closed doors Referee: Alexandros Katsikogiannis (Epirus); Man of the Match: Macauley Chrisantus |

==== Promotion play-offs ====
===== Table =====
| Pos | Team | Pld | W | D | L | GF | GA | GD | Pts | Promotion |
|---|---|---|---|---|---|---|---|---|---|---|
| 1 | AEK Athens (C, P) | 10 | 5 | 3 | 2 | 14 | 9 | +5 | 28 | Promotion to Super League |
| 2 | Iraklis (P) | 10 | 6 | 1 | 3 | 10 | 5 | +5 | 26 | Promotion to Super League |
| 3 | Apollon Smyrnis | 10 | 6 | 2 | 2 | 16 | 10 | +6 | 20 | |
| 4 | AEL | 10 | 4 | 1 | 5 | 10 | 11 | −1 | 13 | |
| 5 | Olympiacos Volos | 10 | 3 | 1 | 6 | 8 | 12 | −4 | 10 | |
| 6 | Panachaiki | 10 | 1 | 2 | 7 | 12 | 23 | −11 | 5 | |

Source: Football League
Rules for classification: 1) points; 2) goal difference; 3) number of goals scored.
(C) Champions; (P) Promoted

===== Results summary =====
| Overall | | | | | | | | Home | | | | | | Away | | | | | |
| Pld | W | D | L | GF | GA | GD | Pts | W | D | L | GF | GA | GD | W | D | L | GF | GA | GD |
|---|---|---|---|---|---|---|---|---|---|---|---|---|---|---|---|---|---|---|---|
| 10 | 5 | 3 | 2 | 14 | 9 | +5 | 28 | 4 | 1 | 0 | 8 | 2 | +6 | 1 | 2 | 2 | 6 | 7 | −1 |

Last updated: 2015-06-10.
Source: aekfc.gr

===== Results by Matchday =====
| Round | 1 | 2 | 3 | 4 | 5 | 6 | 7 | 8 | 9 | 10 |
|---|---|---|---|---|---|---|---|---|---|---|
| Ground | A | H | H | A | H | H | A | A | H | A |
| Result | L | W | W | W | W | W | D | D | D | L |
| Position | 2 | 2 | 2 | 1 | 1 | 1 | 1 | 1 | 1 | 1 |

Updated to match(es) played on 10 June 2015. Source: Competitive matches
A = Away; H = Home; W = Win; D = Draw; L = Loss; P = Postponed

===== Matches =====
| 26 April 2015 1 | Iraklis | 2–1 | AEK Athens | Thessaloniki |
| 18:00 EEST (UTC+3) | Perrone (yellow card) 4', (goal) 34'; Pasas 11'; Romano (yellow card) 37'; Intzoglou (yellow card) 45+2' | Report | Zorić (yellow card) 24'; Aravidis 27'; Barbosa (yellow card) 64' | Stadium: Kaftanzoglio Stadium; Attendance: 13,000; Referee: Alexandros Aretopoulos (Trikala); Man of the Match: Giannis Pasas |

| 4 May 2015 2 | AEK Athens | 3–0 | Panachaiki | Marousi |
| 18:00 EEST (UTC+3) | Aravidis 4' (pen.), 68'; Kolovetsios (yellow card) 36'; Bakakis (yellow card) 60', (goal) 90+2' | Report | Kargas (yellow card) 3'; Asigba (yellow card) 23' | Stadium: Olympic Stadium; Attendance: Behind closed doors Referee: Giorgos Liachoudis (Macedonia); Man of the Match: Christos Aravidis |

| 9 May 2015 3 | AEK Athens | 2–1 | Apollon Smyrnis | Marousi |
| 18:00 EEST (UTC+3) | Barbosa 60'; Kolovetsios (yellow card) 84'; Soiledis 90' | Report | Souanis (yellow card) 22'; Bambam (yellow card) 30'; Angulo 47', (yellow card) 90'; Psianos (yellow card) 80' | Stadium: Olympic Stadium; Attendance: 4,273; Referee: Marios Labropoulos (Elis); Man of the Match: Aristidis Soiledis |

| 13 May 2015 4 | AEL | 0–1 | AEK Athens | Larissa |
| 18:00 EEST (UTC+3) | Sarakatsanos (yellow card) 13'; Nebegleras (yellow card) 76' | Report | Platellas 42'; Anakoglou (yellow card) 45+5'; Georgeas (yellow card) 86'; Chrisantus (yellow card) 88'; Aravidis (yellow card) 89' | Stadium: Alcazar Stadium; Attendance: 10,000; Referee: Aristomenis Koutsiaftis (Arta); Man of the Match: Giannis Anestis |

| 20 May 2015 5 | AEK Athens | 1–0 | Olympiacos Volos | Marousi |
| 19:00 EEST (UTC+3) | Grontis 49' | Report | Rokas (yellow card) 9'; Barbas (yellow card) 36'; Triantafyllakos (yellow card) 79' | Stadium: Olympic Stadium; Attendance: 1,803; Referee: Dimitrios Styliaras (Aetoloacarnania); Man of the Match: Jakob Johansson |

| 25 May 2015 6 | AEK Athens | 1–0 | Iraklis | Marousi |
| 18:00 EEST (UTC+3) | Barbosa (yellow card) 42'; Anakoglou 59'; Georgeas (yellow card) 88'; Platellas (yellow card) 90' | Report | Ziabaris (yellow card) 8'; Intzoglou (yellow card) 30'; Boukouvalas (yellow card) 54' | Stadium: Olympic Stadium; Attendance: 3,121; Referee: Anastasios Sidiropoulos (Dodecanese); Man of the Match: Ilias Vouras |

| 31 May 2015 7 | Panachaiki | 1–1 | AEK Athens | Corinth |
| 19:00 EEST (UTC+3) | Bountopoulos 6', (yellow card) 48'; Anastasopoulos (yellow card) 15'; Masouras (yellow card) 45'; Kontochristos (yellow card) 80' | Report | Grontis (yellow card) 44'; Aravidis (yellow card) 48'; Chrisantus 68'; Soiledis (yellow card) 90' | Stadium: Korinthos Stadium; Attendance: 500; Referee: Athanasios Giachos (Chios); Man of the Match: Georgios Bountopoulos |

| 3 June 2015 8 | Apollon Smyrnis | 3–3 | AEK Athens | Rizoupoli |
| 19:00 EEST (UTC+3) | Tzioras 24', (yellow card) 87'; Angulo 45+1'; Vasilantonopoulos (yellow card) 48'; Souanis 81'; Iraklis (yellow card) 90' (yellow-red card) 90+3' | Report | Chrisantus 37', 77'; Barbosa 88' | Stadium: Georgios Kamaras Stadium; Attendance: 500; Referee: Giannis Papadopoulos (Macedonia); Man of the Match: Christos Tzioras |

| 7 June 2015 9 | AEK Athens | 1–1 | AEL | Marousi |
| 19:00 EEST (UTC+3) | Aravidis 31' (yellow card) 32'; Platellas (yellow card) 73'; Georgeas (yellow card) 90+1' | Report | Eliomar (yellow card) 27'; Kontodimos (yellow card) 27', (goal) 41'; Banousis (yellow card) 62' (yellow-red card) 90+1' | Stadium: Olympic Stadium; Attendance: 3,215; Referee: Charalambos Selemidis (Pella); Man of the Match: Jakob Johansson |

| 10 June 2015 10 | Olympiacos Volos | 1–0 | AEK Athens | Volos |
| 18:00 EEST (UTC+3) | Diamantopoulos 49'; Boutzikos (yellow card) 57' | Report | Svarnas (yellow card) 32'; Cordero (yellow card) 64' | Stadium: Volos Municipal Stadium; Attendance: 500; Referee: Giorgos Foukakis (Heraklion); Man of the Match: Alexandros Nikolias |

=== Greek Cup ===
==== Preliminary round ====
| 29 August 2014 First leg | AEK Athens | 4–0 | Fokikos | Marousi |
| 20:00 EEST (UTC+3) | Kolovetsios 24'; Platellas 57'; Barbosa 68'; Anakoglou 71' | Report | Moustakis (yellow card) 19' | Stadium: Olympic Stadium; Attendance: 12,000; Referee: Aristeidis Vatsios (West Attica); Man of the Match: Hélder Barbosa |

| 12 September 2014 Second leg | Fokikos | 0–1 (0–5 agg.) | AEK Athens | Amfissa |
| 18:00 EEST (UTC+3) | Gacesa (yellow card) 10'; Kantoutsis (yellow card) 27'; Charitidis (yellow card) 45+1'; Kallergis (yellow card) 73' | Report | Mantalos (yellow card) 19'; Faye 90+1' | Stadium: Amfissa Municipal Stadium] Attendance: 1,000; Referee: Alekos Tsamouris (Piraeus); Man of the Match: Ablaye Faye |

==== Group E ====
| Pos | Team | Pld | W | D | L | GF | GA | GD | Pts | Qualification | AEK | PNT | ATR | IRP |
|---|---|---|---|---|---|---|---|---|---|---|---|---|---|---|
| 1 | AEK Athens | 3 | 2 | 1 | 0 | 6 | 0 | +6 | 7 | Round of 16 | | — | 3–0 | 3–0 |
| 2 | Panthrakikos | 3 | 1 | 2 | 0 | 3 | 2 | +1 | 5 | Round of 16 | 0–0 | | — | 2–1 |
| 3 | Atromitos | 3 | 1 | 1 | 1 | 2 | 4 | −2 | 4 | | — | 1–1 | | — |
| 4 | Iraklis Psachna | 3 | 0 | 0 | 3 | 1 | 6 | −5 | 0 | | — | — | 0–1 | |

Source: epo.gr

===== Matches =====
| 24 September 2014 1 | Panthrakikos | 0–0 | AEK Athens | Komotini |
| 16:30 EEST (UTC+3) | Araba (yellow card) 17'; Ladakis (yellow card) 28'; Mejia (yellow card) 59'; Cases (yellow card) 79' | Report | Anakoglou (yellow card) 31'; Aravidis (yellow card) 68' | Stadium: Komotini Municipal Stadium; Attendance: 5,000; Referee: Dimitrios Thanos (Grevena); Man of the Match: Giorgos Athanasiadis |

| 28 October 2014 2 | AEK Athens | 3–0 | Iraklis Psachna | Marousi |
| 19:30 EET (UTC+2) | Zorić (yellow card) 14'; Cordero 42'; Barbosa (penalty missed) 59'; Mantalos 66'; Bakakis 79' | Report | Bakomitros (yellow card) 20'; Lomba (yellow card) 40'; Paligeorgos (yellow card) 58'; Warden (red card) 60'; Paleologos (yellow card) 65'; Dilaveris (yellow card) 89' | Stadium: Olympic Stadium; Attendance: 7,852; Referee: Aristeidis Vatsios (West Attica); Man of the Match: Darko Zorić |

| 8 January 2015 3 | AEK Athens | 3–0 | Atromitos | Marousi |
| 17:15 EET (UTC+2) | Aravidis 5'; Lampropoulos 29'; Platellas (yellow card) 33'; Tzanetopoulos 58'; Rovas (yellow card) 65' | Report | Katsouranis (yellow card) 24'; Pitu (red card) 45'; Napoleoni (yellow card) 65' | Stadium: Olympic Stadium; Attendance: 12,204; Referee: Anastasios Sidiropoulos (Dodecanese); Man of the Match: Petros Mantalos |

==== Round of 16 ====
| 21 January 2015 First leg | Kerkyra | 1–1 | AEK Athens | Corfu |
| 17:45 EET (UTC+2) | Andreopoulos (yellow card) 35'; Venetis 58'; Paraskevaidis (yellow card) 67'; Cardozo (yellow card) 90+1' | Report | Anakoglou (yellow card) 32'; Fábio 68' (o.g.); Lampropoulos (yellow card) 74'; Mantalos (yellow card) 79' | Stadium: Kerkyra Stadium; Attendance: 2,000; Referee: Anastasios Papapetrou (Athens); Man of the Match: Vasilios Lampropoulos |

| 29 January 2015 Second leg | AEK Athens | 2–0 (3–1 agg.) | Kerkyra | Marousi |
| 17:00 EET (UTC+2) | Mantalos 51'; Bakakis (yellow card) 80'; Aravidis 82'; Anakoglou (yellow card) 88' | Report | Andreopoulos (yellow card) 36'; Kajkut (yellow card) 43'; Gomes (yellow card) 50'; Fábio (yellow card) 64'; Venetis (yellow card) 74' | Stadium: Olympic Stadium; Attendance: 9,795; Referee: Stavros Tritsonis (Athens); Man of the Match: Christos Aravidis |

==== Quarter-finals ====
| 11 February 2015 First leg | Olympiacos | 1–1 | AEK Athens | Piraeus |
| 19:30 EET (UTC+2) | Salino (yellow card) 42'; Milivojević 48'; Fortounis (yellow card) 69' | Report | Aravidis 14'; Lampropoulos (yellow card) 39'; Barbosa (yellow card) 41'; Mantalos (yellow card) 54' | Stadium: Karaiskakis Stadium; Attendance: 30,000; Referee: Marios Lampropoulos (Elis); Man of the Match: Christos Aravidis |

| 11 March 2015 Second leg | AEK Athens | 0–3 (Awarded) (1–4 agg.) | Olympiacos | Marousi |
| 19:00 EET (UTC+2) | Mantalos (yellow card) 24'; Bakakis (yellow card) 82'; Platellas (yellow card) 87' | Report | Milivojević (yellow card) 43'; Botía (yellow card) 71'; Kasami (yellow card) 80'; Jara 89' | Stadium: Olympic Stadium; Attendance: 64,256; Referee: Charalampos Kalogeropoulos (Athens); Man of the Match: Franco Jara |
Note: Immediately after the goal of Olympiacos, about 20 fans of AEK Athens entered the area around the pitch and threw objects from the stands. The squad of Olympiacos went to the locker rooms with the referee, who about half an hour later announced the final suspension of the match at the expense of AEK, which essentially meant the qualification of Olympiacos.

== Statistics ==
=== Squad statistics ===
As of 10 June 2015

| No. | Pos | Player | Football League | | Promotion Play-offs | | Greek Cup | | Total | |
| No. | Pos | Player | Apps | Goals | Apps | Goals | Apps | Goals | Apps | Goals |
Goalkeepers
| 1 | GK | (Greece) Ilias Vouras | 3 | 0 | 2 | 0 | 0 | 0 | 5 | 0 |
| 12 | GK | (Greece) Fotis Karagiolidis | 1 | 0 | 2 | 0 | 0 | 0 | 3 | 0 |
| 22 | GK | (Greece) Giannis Anestis | 18 | 0 | 5 | 0 | 9 | 0 | 32 | 0 |
| 30 | GK | (Greece) Panagiotis Dounis | 0 | 0 | 1 | 0 | 0 | 0 | 1 | 0 |
Defenders
| 2 | DF | (Greece) Aristidis Soiledis | 7 | 0 | 9 | 1 | 4 | 0 | 20 | 1 |
| 3 | DF | (Greece) Stavros Petavrakis | 14 | 0 | 3 | 0 | 5 | 0 | 22 | 0 |
| 5 | DF | (Greece) Vasilios Lampropoulos | 17 | 2 | 7 | 0 | 8 | 1 | 32 | 3 |
| 15 | DF | (Greece) Stratos Svarnas | 1 | 0 | 2 | 0 | 0 | 0 | 3 | 0 |
| 26 | DF | (Greece) Dimitrios Kolovetsios | 15 | 1 | 7 | 0 | 5 | 1 | 27 | 2 |
| 27 | DF | (Greece) Michalis Bakakis | 15 | 0 | 5 | 1 | 8 | 1 | 28 | 2 |
| 31 | DF | (Greece) Nikolaos Georgeas | 6 | 0 | 5 | 0 | 0 | 0 | 11 | 0 |
| 55 | DF | (Greece) Adam Tzanetopoulos | 9 | 0 | 7 | 0 | 5 | 1 | 21 | 1 |
| 89 | DF | (Greece) Georgios Sarris | 7 | 0 | 2 | 0 | 3 | 0 | 12 | 0 |
Midfielders
| 4 | MF | (Greece) Vasilios Rovas | 13 | 0 | 3 | 0 | 7 | 0 | 23 | 0 |
| 6 | MF | (Spain) Miguel Cordero | 11 | 0 | 5 | 0 | 3 | 1 | 19 | 1 |
| 10 | MF | (Greece) Dimitrios Anakoglou | 19 | 3 | 10 | 0 | 8 | 1 | 37 | 4 |
| 14 | MF | (Greece) Dimitrios Grontis | 6 | 0 | 6 | 1 | 2 | 0 | 14 | 1 |
| 18 | MF | (Sweden) Jakob Johansson | 12 | 1 | 9 | 0 | 5 | 0 | 26 | 1 |
| 20 | MF | (Greece) Petros Mantalos | 15 | 8 | 0 | 0 | 8 | 2 | 23 | 10 |
| 44 | MF | (Senegal) Ablaye Faye | 8 | 0 | 3 | 0 | 2 | 1 | 13 | 1 |
Forwards
| 7 | FW | (Portugal) Hélder Barbosa | 17 | 3 | 9 | 2 | 8 | 1 | 34 | 6 |
| 8 | FW | (Brazil) Alexandre D'Acol | 8 | 4 | 5 | 0 | 6 | 0 | 19 | 4 |
| 9 | FW | (Croatia) Ivan Brečević | 10 | 8 | 0 | 0 | 3 | 0 | 13 | 8 |
| 11 | FW | (Greece) Vangelis Platellas | 18 | 7 | 8 | 1 | 9 | 1 | 35 | 9 |
| 17 | FW | (Montenegro) Darko Zorić | 15 | 3 | 4 | 0 | 2 | 0 | 21 | 3 |
| 21 | FW | (Greece) Christos Aravidis | 20 | 13 | 9 | 4 | 9 | 3 | 38 | 20 |
| 23 | FW | (Greece) Markos Dounis | 11 | 5 | 4 | 0 | 6 | 0 | 21 | 5 |
| 99 | FW | (Nigeria) Macauley Chrisantus | 8 | 3 | 8 | 3 | 1 | 0 | 17 | 6 |
Left during Winter Transfer Window
| 16 | FW | (Greece) Vasilios Tsevas | 2 | 0 | 0 | 0 | 0 | 0 | 2 | 0 |

=== Goalscorers ===
As of 10 June 2015
The list is sorted by competition order when total goals are equal, then by position and then by squad number.

| Rank | No. | Pos. | Player | Football League | Football League Play-offs | Greek Cup | Total |
|---|---|---|---|---|---|---|---|
| 1 | 21 | FW | (Greece) Christos Aravidis | 13 | 4 | 5 | 20 |
| 2 | 20 | MF | (Greece) Petros Mantalos | 8 | 0 | 2 | 10 |
| 3 | 11 | FW | (Greece) Vangelis Platellas | 7 | 1 | 1 | 9 |
| 4 | 9 | FW | (Croatia) Ivan Brečević | 8 | 0 | 0 | 8 |
| 5 | 99 | FW | (Nigeria) Macauley Chrisantus | 3 | 3 | 0 | 6 |
| 5 | 7 | FW | (Portugal) Hélder Barbosa | 3 | 2 | 1 | 6 |
| 7 | 23 | FW | (Greece) Markos Dounis | 5 | 0 | 0 | 5 |
| 7 | 10 | MF | (Greece) Dimitrios Anakoglou | 3 | 1 | 1 | 5 |
| 9 | 8 | FW | (Brazil) Alexandre D'Acol | 4 | 0 | 0 | 4 |
| 10 | 17 | FW | (Montenegro) Darko Zorić | 3 | 0 | 0 | 3 |
| 10 | 5 | DF | (Greece) Vasilios Lampropoulos | 2 | 0 | 1 | 3 |
| 12 | 26 | DF | (Greece) Dimitrios Kolovetsios | 1 | 0 | 1 | 2 |
| 12 | 27 | DF | (Greece) Michalis Bakakis | 0 | 1 | 1 | 2 |
| 12 | 6 | MF | (Spain) Miguel Cordero | 0 | 0 | 1 | 1 |
| 12 | 44 | MF | (Senegal) Ablaye Faye | 0 | 0 | 1 | 1 |
| 12 | 55 | DF | (Greece) Adam Tzanetopoulos | 0 | 0 | 1 | 1 |
| 12 | 18 | MF | (Sweden) Jakob Johansson | 1 | 0 | 0 | 1 |
| 12 | 2 | DF | (Greece) Aristidis Soiledis | 0 | 1 | 0 | 1 |
| 12 | 14 | MF | (Greece) Dimitrios Grontis | 0 | 1 | 0 | 1 |
| Own goals | | | | 0 | 0 | 1 | 1 |
| Totals | | | | 61 | 14 | 15 | 90 |

=== Hat-tricks ===
Numbers in superscript represent the goals that the player scored.

| Player | Against | Result | Date | Competition | Source |
|---|---|---|---|---|---|
| (Greece) Petros Mantalos | (Greece) Episkopi | 7–0 (H) | 7 December 2014 | Football League | |
| (Croatia) Ivan Brečević | (Greece) Kallithea | 5–1 (H) | 11 January 2015 | Football League | |

=== Assists ===
As of 10 June 2015
The list is sorted by competition order when total assists are equal, then by position and then by squad number.

| Rank | No. | Pos. | Player | Football League | Football League Play-offs | Greek Cup | Total |
|---|---|---|---|---|---|---|---|
| 1 | 20 | MF | (Greece) Petros Mantalos | 11 | 0 | 4 | 15 |
| 2 | 7 | FW | (Portugal) Hélder Barbosa | 6 | 4 | 4 | 14 |
| 3 | 11 | FW | (Greece) Vangelis Platellas | 4 | 1 | 2 | 7 |
| 4 | 2 | DF | (Greece) Aristidis Soiledis | 3 | 0 | 1 | 4 |
| 4 | 8 | FW | (Brazil) Alexandre D'Acol | 1 | 2 | 1 | 4 |
| 6 | 3 | DF | (Greece) Stavros Petavrakis | 3 | 0 | 0 | 3 |
| 6 | 23 | FW | (Greece) Markos Dounis | 3 | 0 | 0 | 3 |
| 8 | 4 | MF | (Greece) Vasilios Rovas | 2 | 0 | 0 | 2 |
| 8 | 10 | MF | (Greece) Dimitrios Anakoglou | 2 | 0 | 0 | 2 |
| 8 | 21 | FW | (Greece) Christos Aravidis | 2 | 0 | 0 | 2 |
| 8 | 55 | DF | (Greece) Adam Tzanetopoulos | 1 | 1 | 0 | 2 |
| 8 | 17 | FW | (Montenegro) Darko Zorić | 1 | 1 | 0 | 2 |
| 13 | 27 | DF | (Greece) Michalis Bakakis | 1 | 0 | 0 | 1 |
| 13 | 14 | MF | (Greece) Dimitrios Grontis | 1 | 0 | 0 | 1 |
| 13 | 9 | FW | (Croatia) Ivan Brečević | 1 | 0 | 0 | 1 |
| 13 | 6 | MF | (Spain) Miguel Cordero | 0 | 1 | 0 | 1 |
| Totals | | | | 42 | 10 | 12 | 64 |

=== Clean sheets ===
As of 10 June 2015
The list is sorted by competition order when total clean sheets are equal and then by squad number. Clean sheets in games where both goalkeepers participated are awarded to the goalkeeper who started the game. Goalkeepers with no appearances are not included.

| Rank | No. | Player | Football League | Promotion Play-offs | Greek Cup | Total |
|---|---|---|---|---|---|---|
| 1 | 22 | (Greece) Giannis Anestis | 9 | 2 | 6 | 17 |
| 2 | 1 | (Greece) Ilias Vouras | 2 | 2 | 0 | 4 |
| 3 | 12 | (Greece) Fotis Karagiolidis | 1 | 0 | 0 | 1 |
| Totals | | | 12 | 4 | 6 | 22 |

=== Disciplinary record ===
As of 10 June 2015

| N | P | Nat. | Name | Football League | | | Promotion Play-offs | | | Greek Cup | | | Total | | | Notes |
| N | P | Nat. | Name | Yellow card | Second yellow card | Red card | Yellow card | Second yellow card | Red card | Yellow card | Second yellow card | Red card | Yellow card | Second yellow card | Red card | Notes |
Goalkeepers
| 1 | GK | (Greece) | Ilias Vouras | | | | | | | | | | | | | |
| 12 | GK | (Greece) | Fotis Karagiolidis | | | | | | | | | | | | | |
| 22 | GK | (Greece) | Giannis Anestis | 1 | | | | | | | | | 1 | | | |
| 30 | GK | (Greece) | Panagiotis Dounis | | | | | | | | | | | | | |
Defenders
| 2 | DF | (Greece) | Aristidis Soiledis | | | | 1 | | | | | | 1 | | | |
| 3 | DF | (Greece) | Stavros Petavrakis | 3 | | | | | | | | | 3 | | | |
| 5 | DF | (Greece) | Vasilios Lampropoulos | 5 | | | | | | 2 | | | 7 | | | |
| 15 | DF | (Greece) | Stratos Svarnas | | | | 1 | | | | | | 1 | | | |
| 26 | DF | (Greece) | Dimitrios Kolovetsios | 2 | | | 2 | | | | | | 4 | | | |
| 27 | DF | (Greece) | Michalis Bakakis | | | | 1 | | | 2 | | | 3 | | | |
| 31 | DF | (Greece) | Nikolaos Georgeas | 2 | | | 2 | | | | | | 4 | | | |
| 55 | DF | (Greece) | Adam Tzanetopoulos | 1 | | | | | | | | | 1 | | | |
| 89 | DF | (Greece) | Georgios Sarris | 2 | | | 1 | | | | | | 3 | | | |
Midfielders
| 4 | MF | (Greece) | Vasilios Rovas | 1 | | | | | | 1 | | | 2 | | | |
| 6 | MF | (Spain) | Miguel Cordero | 4 | | | 1 | | | | | | 5 | | | |
| 10 | MF | (Greece) | Dimitrios Anakoglou | 1 | | | 2 | | | 3 | | | 6 | | | |
| 14 | MF | (Greece) | Dimitrios Grontis | | | | 1 | | | | | | 1 | | | |
| 18 | MF | (Sweden) | Jakob Johansson | | | | | | | | | | | | | |
| 20 | MF | (Greece) | Petros Mantalos | 5 | 1 | | | | | 4 | | | 9 | 1 | | |
| 44 | MF | (Senegal) | Ablaye Faye | | | | | | | | | | | | | |
Forwards
| 7 | FW | (Portugal) | Hélder Barbosa | 4 | | | 2 | | | 1 | | | 7 | | | |
| 8 | FW | (Brazil) | Alexandre D'Acol | | | | | | | | | | | | | |
| 9 | FW | (Croatia) | Ivan Brečević | 1 | | | | | | | | | 1 | | | |
| 11 | FW | (Greece) | Vangelis Platellas | 3 | 1 | | 2 | | | 2 | | | 7 | 1 | | |
| 17 | FW | (Montenegro) | Darko Zorić | 3 | | | 1 | | | 1 | | | 5 | | | |
| 21 | FW | (Greece) | Christos Aravidis | 2 | 1 | | 3 | | | 1 | | | 6 | 1 | | |
| 23 | FW | (Greece) | Markos Dounis | 2 | | | | | | | | | 2 | | | |
| 99 | FW | (Nigeria) | Macauley Chrisantus | 1 | | | 1 | | | | | | 2 | | | |
Left during Winter Transfer window
| 16 | FW | (Greece) | Vasilios Tsevas | | | | | | | | | | | | | |

=== Starting 11 ===
This section presents the most frequently used formation along with the players with the most starts across all competitions.

| N. | Formation | Matchday(s) |
|---|---|---|
| 41 | 4–2–3–1 | 1–4, 6–10, 12–18, 19–23, 25, 26 |

| No. | Nat. | Player | Pos. |
|---|---|---|---|
| 22 | (Greece) | Giannis Anestis | GK |
| 26 | (Greece) | Dimitrios Kolovetsios | RCB |
| 5 | (Greece) | Vasilios Lampropoulos | LCB |
| 27 | (Greece) | Michalis Bakakis | RB |
| 3 | (Greece) | Stavros Petavrakis | LB |
| 18 | (Sweden) | Jakob Johansson | DM |
| 10 | (Greece) | Dimitrios Anakoglou (C) | CM |
| 11 | (Greece) | Vangelis Platellas | RM |
| 7 | (Portugal) | Hélder Barbosa | LM |
| 20 | (Greece) | Petros Mantalos | AM |
| 21 | (Greece) | Christos Aravidis | CF |

Last updated: 2015-06-10

== Awards ==
| Player | Pos. | Award | Source |
|---|---|---|---|
| (Greece) Christos Aravidis | FW | Player of the Year (South Group) | |
| (Sweden) Jakob Johansson | MF | Foreign Player of the Year (South Group) | |
| (Greece) Traianos Dellas | — | Manager of the Year (South Group) | |
| (Greece) Christos Aravidis | FW | Football League Top Scorer | |
