= Daysam Ben Nasr =

French footballer (born 1998)

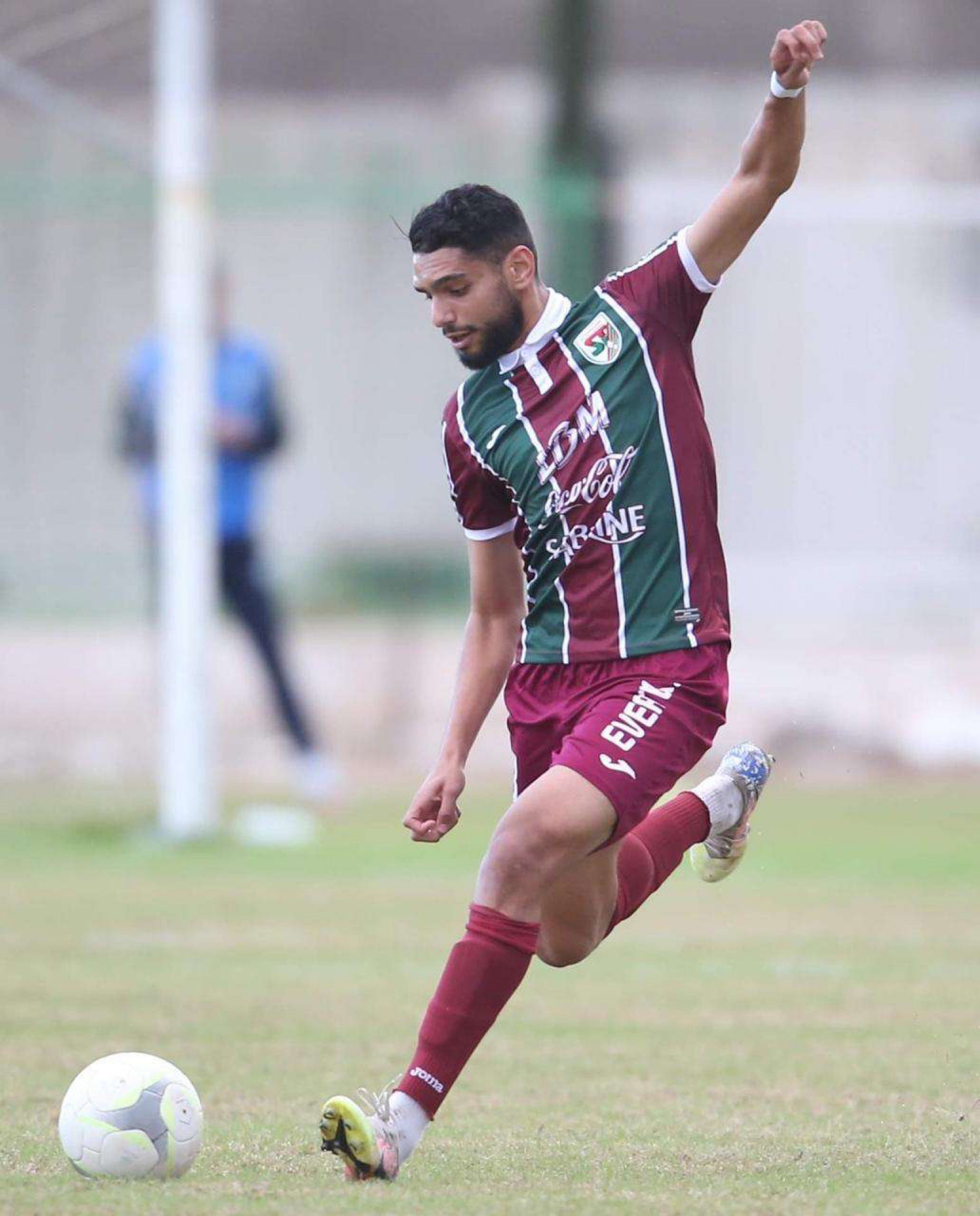
- Ben Nasr with Stade Tunisien

Personal information
- Date of birth: 31 March 1998 (age 28)
- Place of birth: Vichy, France
- Height: 1.85 m (6 ft 1 in)
- Position: Midfielder

Team information
- Current team: Blois
- Number: 10

Youth career
- SCA Cusset
- RC Vichy
- Moulins
- Cournon-d'Auvergne
- Clermont Foot

Senior career*
Years	Team	Apps	(Gls)
2017–2018	Montluçon	33	(5)
2018–2021	Stade Tunisien	34	(1)
2021	Casale	8	(0)
2021–2022	Lavagnese	21	(0)
2022–2024	Alès	43	(3)
2024–	Blois	35	(4)
- * Club domestic league appearances and goals as of 5 December 2025

Daysam Ben Nasr (Arabic: ديسم بن نصر; born 31 March 1998) is a French footballer who plays as a midfielder for Championnat National 1 club Blois.

== Club career ==
Born in Vichy, France, Ben Nasr started his career with local side Sporting Club Amical Cussétois, before joining the youth academy of RC Vichy. From there, he joined a Pôle Espoir in Vichy, organised by the French Football Federation. He would go on to spend two years at AS Moulins, before joining Cournon-d'Auvergne and then Clermont Foot.

Following his release by Clermont Foot, Ben Nasr dropped down to the Championnat National 3 with Montluçon. After two seasons with the Montluçon-based side, he reportedly returned to the country of his heritage, Tunisia, for personal reasons. However, to the surprise of his coach at Montluçon, Mickaël Bessaque, Ben Nasr had signed a five-year deal with Tunisian Ligue Professionnelle 1 side Stade Tunisien.

After Stade Tunisien's relegation to the Tunisian Ligue Professionnelle 2 in 2021, Ben Nasr returned to Europe to sign for Italian Serie D side Casale. However, he would leave for fellow Serie D side Lavagnese in December of the same year.

In June 2022, Ben Nasr returned to France, signing with Olympique Alès for one season. He renewed his contract for another season in the summer of 2023.

== Career statistics ==
=== Club ===
As of 16 December 2023.

Club	Season	League			Cup		Continental		Other		Total	
Club	Season	Division	Apps	Goals	Apps	Goals	Apps	Goals	Apps	Goals	Apps	Goals
Montluçon	2017–18	Championnat National 3	24	4	0	0	–		0	0	24	4
Montluçon	2018–19	Championnat National 3	9	1	1 (Note: Appearances in the Coupe de France)	0	–		0	0	10	1
Montluçon	Total		33	5	1	0	0	0	0	0	34	5
Stade Tunisien	2018–19	CLP-1	10	0	1 (Note: Appearances in the Tunisian Cup)	0	0	0	0	0	11	0
Stade Tunisien	2019–20	CLP-1	20	1	2	0	0	0	0	0	22	1
Stade Tunisien	2020–21	CLP-1	4	0	0	0	0	0	0	0	4	0
Stade Tunisien	Total		34	1	3	0	0	0	0	0	37	1
Casale	2021–22	Serie D	8	0	0	0	–		0	0	8	0
Lavagnese	2021–22	Serie D	21	0	0	0	–		0	0	21	0
Alès	2022–23	Championnat National 2	18	1	1	0	—		0	0	19	1
Alès	2023–24	Championnat National 2	12	2	2	1	—		0	0	14	3
Alès	Total		30	3	3	1	0	0	0	0	33	4
Career total			126	9	7	1	0	0	0	0	133	10
