= Chiotti =

Chiotti is a surname. Notable people with the surname include:

- David Chiotti (born 1984), American basketball player
- Dorian Chiotti (born 1998), Mauritian footballer
- Jérôme Chiotti (born 1972), French cyclist
