= Georgios Iordanidis =

Georgios Iordanidis may refer to:

- Georgios Iordanidis (midfielder) (born 1989), Greek football midfielder
- Georgios Iordanidis (defender) (born 1989), Greek football manager and former defender
