= Jean-Louis Coustillet =

French footballer (1943–2021)

Personal information
- Date of birth: 7 January 1943
- Place of birth: Bayel, France
- Date of death: 14 March 2021 (aged 78)
- Place of death: Bayel, France
- Height: 1.83 m (6 ft 0 in)
- Position: Midfielder

Youth career
- –: ES Bar-Bayel

Senior career*
Years	Team	Apps	(Gls)
- ES Bar-Bayel
1969–1971	Lens	27	(13)
1971–1975	AAJ Blois	78	(9)
1975–1978	ES Viry-Châtillon		

Managerial career
- 1974–1975: AAJ Blois
- 1975–1984: ES Viry-Châtillon
- 1984–1988: Saint-Lô
- 1988–1992: Troyes
- 1994–2001: FC Argentan
- 2014: AS Sainte-Savine
- * Club domestic league appearances and goals

Jean-Louis Coustillet (7 January 1943 – 14 March 2021) was a French football player and coach who played as a midfielder.

== Biography ==
Born in Bayel, Coustillet grew up playing for the local football team. He began playing for RC Lens at the age of 25, where he played for two seasons before joining AAJ Blois. He retired from playing in 1978 as a member of ES Viry-Châtillon.

After he retired from his playing career, Coustillet continued his involvement with ES Viry-Châtillon as a coach, where he stayed for nine years. He coached the only Châtillon team to ever play in Division 2 from 1982 to 1983. He then joined FC Saint-Lô Manche, where he coached from 1984 to 1988. In 1988, he became the coach of Troyes AC, which was struggling to compete in Division 4. However, Coustillet coached them into Division 3 and helped the club reach the round of 16 in 1991–92 Coupe de France, where they were defeated by US Saint-Omer. He left the club in 1992.

Coustillet died of Alzheimer's disease in Bayel on 14 March 2021 at the age of 78.
