= Mickaël Bessaque =

French footballer (born 1975)

Personal information
- Date of birth: 23 October 1975 (age 51)
- Place of birth: Montmirail, France
- Height: 1.66 m (5 ft 5 in)
- Position: Midfielder

Youth career
- 1988–1992: Stade de Reims
- 1992–1993: Louhans-Cuiseaux

Senior career*
Years	Team	Apps	(Gls)
1993–1995	Louhans-Cuiseaux		
1995–2002	Clermont Foot		
2002–2005	Rouen	78	(1)
2005–2006	Rodez	18	(0)
2006–2009	Montluçon	33	(2)

Managerial career
- 2009–2013: Guérêt
- 2013–2018: Domerat
- 2018–2021: Montluçon
- * Club domestic league appearances and goals

Mickaël Bessaque (born 23 October 1975), is a French former footballer and football manager, most recently head coach at Montluçon.

== Club career ==
Spending his entire career in the lower division of France, Bessaque played one full season in Ligue 2 with Rouen.

== Managerial career ==
Having managed lower league sides Guérêt and Domerat, Bessaque was manager of Montluçon between 2018 and 2021.
