= Blois Football 41 =

French association football club

- Full name: Blois Football 41
- Founded: 1912 (as AAJ Blois); 1999 (merger with Blois Union Spotive)
- Ground: Stade Municipal Allées Jean Leroi
- Capacity: 7,000
- Chairman: François Jacob
- Manager: Loic Lambert
- League: National 1 Group B
- 2022–23: National 2 Group A, 8th
- Website: https://www.bloisfootball41.com
Home colours	Away colours

Blois Football 41 (French pronunciation: [blwa futbol kaʁɑ̃t‿e œ̃], "Quarante-et-un") is a French football club based in Blois, Centre-Val de Loire. In 1999, Association amicale de la jeunesse blésoise (commonly abbreviated as AAJB or AAJ Blois) has founded in 1912 merged with Blois Union Sportive, founded in 1984, to form the current club. They currently play in Championnat National 1, the fourth level of French football.

Blois spent nine seasons in Division 2 between 1970 and 1982.

The team plays at Allées Jean Leroi Municipal Stadium in Blois.

== Honours ==
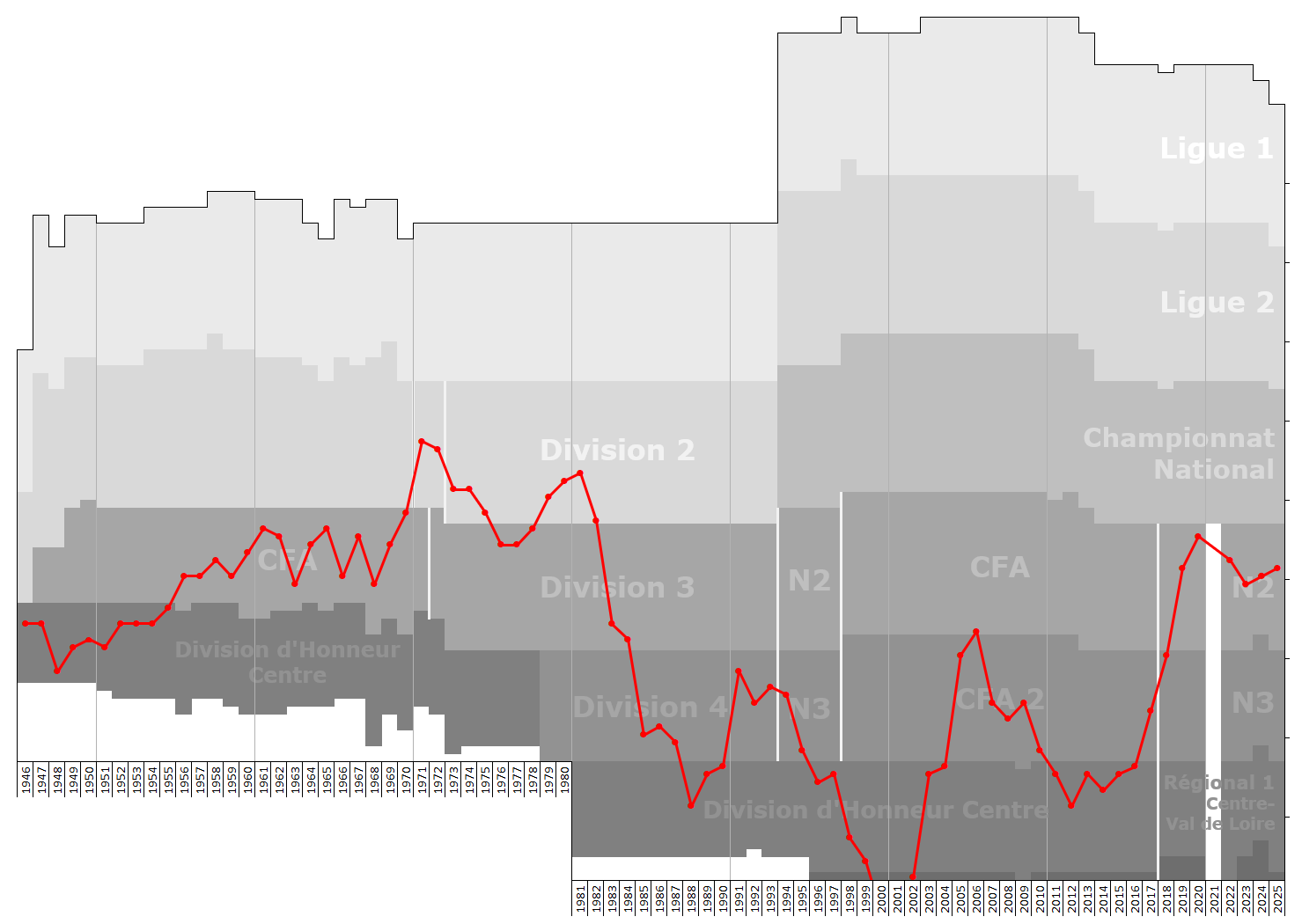
Historical league performance chart of Blois Football 41

- Champion Championnat National 3 (Centre-Val de Loire Group): 2018
- Champion Championnat de France Amateur de Football (Centre-West Group): 1970
- Champion Championnat de France de football de Division 3 (West Group): 1978
- Champion DH Centre: 1933, 1955, 1990, 2004, 2016
- 1/4 finalists of the Coupe de France in 1971 (home: Blois-Marseille 2–4 and away: Marseille-Blois 9–1)
- Champion DH centre féminin: 2007

== Current squad ==
As of 10 April, 2026

Note: Flags indicate national team as defined under FIFA eligibility rules; some limited exceptions apply. Players may hold more than one non-FIFA nationality.

No.	Pos.	Nation	Player
1	GK	MRI	Dorian Chiotti
3	DF	FRA	Gaylord Kitenge
4	DF	FRA	Nathan Bourdin
5	MF	CIV	Guy Tapé
6	MF	CIV	Fred Gnalega
7	MF	FRA	Noé Sommer
8	MF	FRA	Lukas Bonnet
9	FW	FRA	Michael Nsilu Kuyenga
10	MF	TUN	Daysam Ben Nasr
11	FW	FRA	Théo Mothmora
12	DF	FRA	Grégory Coelho
14	FW	CGO	Jonathan N'Sondé

No.	Pos.	Nation	Player
16	GK	FRA	Lino Duhamel
17	DF	FRA	Naom Blé
18	MF	CTA	Espérance Mabekondiasson
19	FW	FRA	Lakhdar Belal
20	FW	FRA	Noa Boisset
21	DF	COM	Yahaya Médard
22	DF	FRA	Dylan Brunetton
25	MF	FRA	Mouctar Diaby
26	MF	FRA	Yaniss Abdallah
27	DF	FRA	Germain Kapela
28	DF	FRA	Nathan Tronchet (on loan from Le Mans)
29	FW	MTQ	Dominique Pandor

== Notable players ==
- (France) Jean-Louis Coustillet
- (France) Aladji Bamba (youth)
