= Bayel =

Commune in Grand Est, France

- Commune
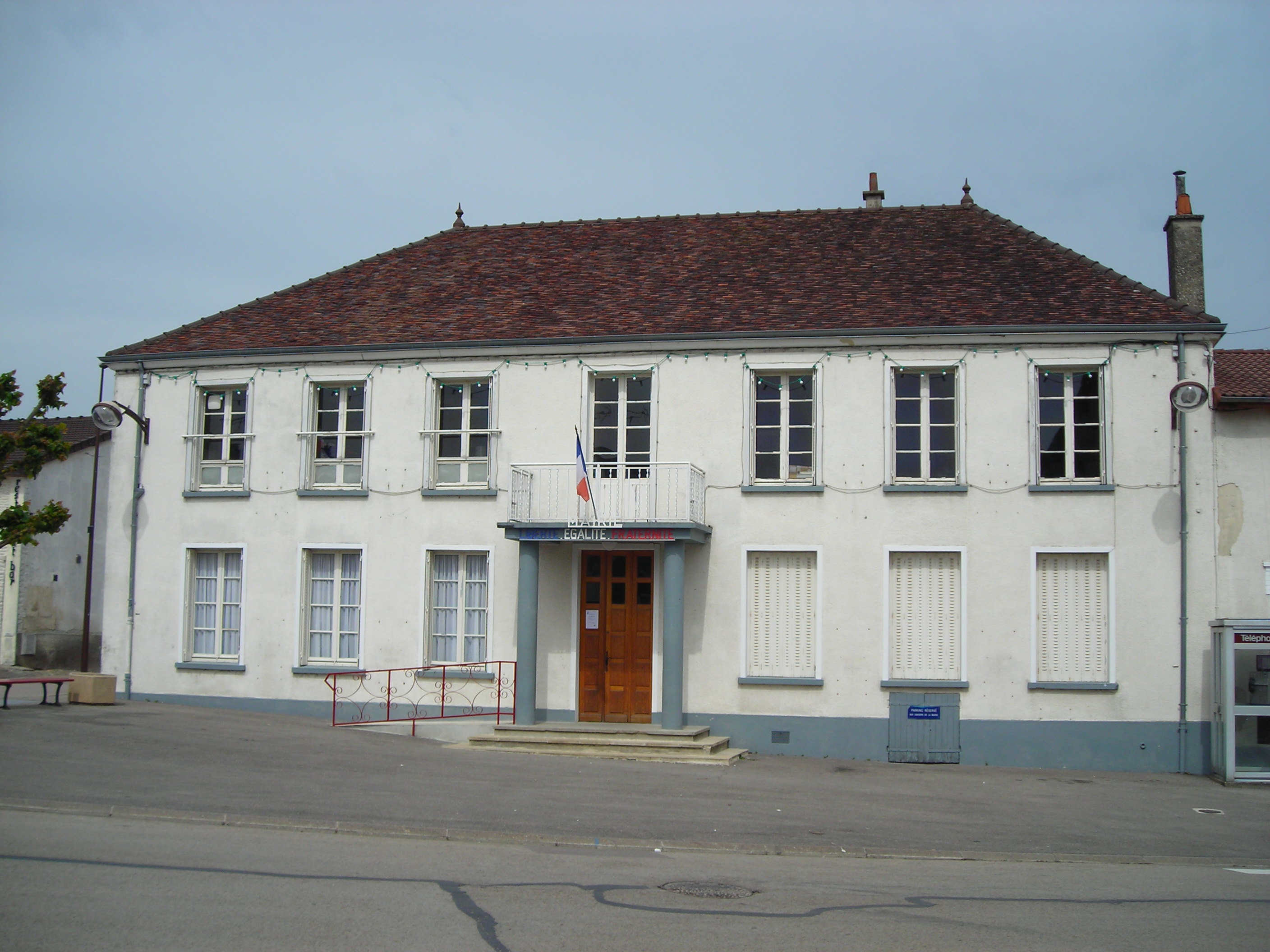
- Bayel Town Hall

- Coat of arms
- Location of Bayel
- Location within France Location within Grand Est
- Coordinates: 48°11′59″N 4°46′34″E
- Country: France
- Region: Grand Est
- Department: Aube
- Arrondissement: Bar-sur-Aube
- Canton: Bar-sur-Aube
- Intercommunality: Région de Bar sur Aube

Government
  - Mayor (2020–2026): Laurence Caillet-Meyer
- Area^{1}: 23 km^{2} (8.9 sq mi)
- Elevation: 181 m (594 ft)
- Population (2023): 738
  - Density: 32/km^{2} (83/sq mi)
- Time zone: UTC+01:00 (CET)
  - Summer (DST): UTC+02:00 (CEST)
- INSEE/Postal code: 10035 /10310
- ^{1} French Land Register data, which excludes lakes, ponds, glaciers > 1 km^{2} (0.386 sq mi or 247 acres) and river estuaries.

Bayel (French pronunciation: [bajɛl]) is a commune in the Aube department in the Grand Est region of north-central France.

The commune has been awarded three flowers by the National Council of Towns and Villages in Bloom in the Competition of cities and villages in Bloom.

== Geography ==
Bayel is located some 23 km west by north-west of Chaumont and 25 km south-east of Brienne-le-Château. Access to the commune is by the D396 from Ville-sous-la-Ferté in the south which passes through the commune just west of the village and continues north-west to Bar-sur-Aube. The D170 goes from the village to join the D396 then south and west to Baroville. The D47 goes north-east from the village to Lignol-le-Château. The TER Grand Est railway from Troyes to Chalindrey passes through the commune coming from Bar-sur-Aube station in the north-west and continuing to Bricon station in the south-east with no station in the commune. The commune is mostly forest with some farmland following the railway line in the west of the commune.

The river Aube flows through the commune and the village forming part of the northern border as it flows north-west to eventually join the Seine at Marcilly-sur-Seine. The Ru du Gravelin rises just east of the commune and flows west to join the Aube. The Fossé de Six Pieds flows from a small lake in the commune to the Aube.

== Toponymy ==
Bayel appears as Bayel on the 1750 Cassini Map and the same on the 1790 version.

== History ==
Bayel has been known for glass work since the year 1300. In 1666 Jean-Baptiste Mazzolay, a Venetian glass master, established a crystal glass works under the aegis of the religious of Clairvaux who were then owners of the premises.

King Louis XIV gave it the label Royal Manufacturer of Crystal in Bayel under letters patent due to the exclusive production and sales between Chaumont and Paris. The factory later became the Royal Crystal of Champagne. Every year thousands of visitors come to see the art of the glassmakers of Bayel.

The crystal works formerly had about 600 employees at the beginning of the 1970s but today there remain only 39.

=== Heraldry ===
Arms of Bayel	Blazon: Sable, a crozier of Or debruised by a bend chequy of Argent and Gules between two fleurs de lis of Or; over all an inescutcheon Azure charged with a wine glass Argent.

== Administration ==
List of Successive Mayors

From	To	Name
	1857	Henri Aubertin
2001	2011	Jacky Varennes
2011	2020	Serge Roussel
2020	2026	Laurence Caillet-Meyer

== Demography ==
The inhabitants of the commune are known as Bayellois or Bayelloises.

Historical population

Year	Pop.	±% p.a.
1793	375	—
1800	475	+3.43%
1806	565	+2.93%
1821	556	−0.11%
1831	619	+1.08%
1836	694	+2.31%
1841	712	+0.51%
1846	707	−0.14%
1851	670	−1.07%
1856	811	+3.89%
1861	860	+1.18%
1866	888	+0.64%
1872	967	+1.43%
1876	1,007	+1.02%
1881	995	−0.24%
1886	1,033	+0.75%
1891	1,063	+0.57%
1896	1,133	+1.28%
1901	1,272	+2.34%

Year	Pop.	±% p.a.
1906	1,454	+2.71%
1911	1,517	+0.85%
1921	1,263	−1.82%
1926	1,405	+2.15%
1931	1,432	+0.38%
1936	1,456	+0.33%
1946	1,319	−0.98%
1954	1,440	+1.10%
1962	1,392	−0.42%
1968	1,353	−0.47%
1975	1,282	−0.77%
1982	1,111	−2.02%
1990	960	−1.81%
1999	860	−1.21%
2007	860	+0.00%
2012	813	−1.12%
2017	758	−1.39%
2023	738	−0.44%

Source: EHESS and INSEE

== Culture and heritage ==
=== Civil heritage ===
- The Tourist Office contains three items that are registered as historical objects:
  - A Commemorative plaque for Pierre Moreau (1749)
  - A Commemorative plaque for Marie Simmonot (1730)
  - The Furniture in the Tourist Office

The commune has two sites that are registered as historical monuments:

- The Royal Glassworks of Champagne (19th century)
- The La Borde Farmhouse (16th century)

=== Religious heritage ===
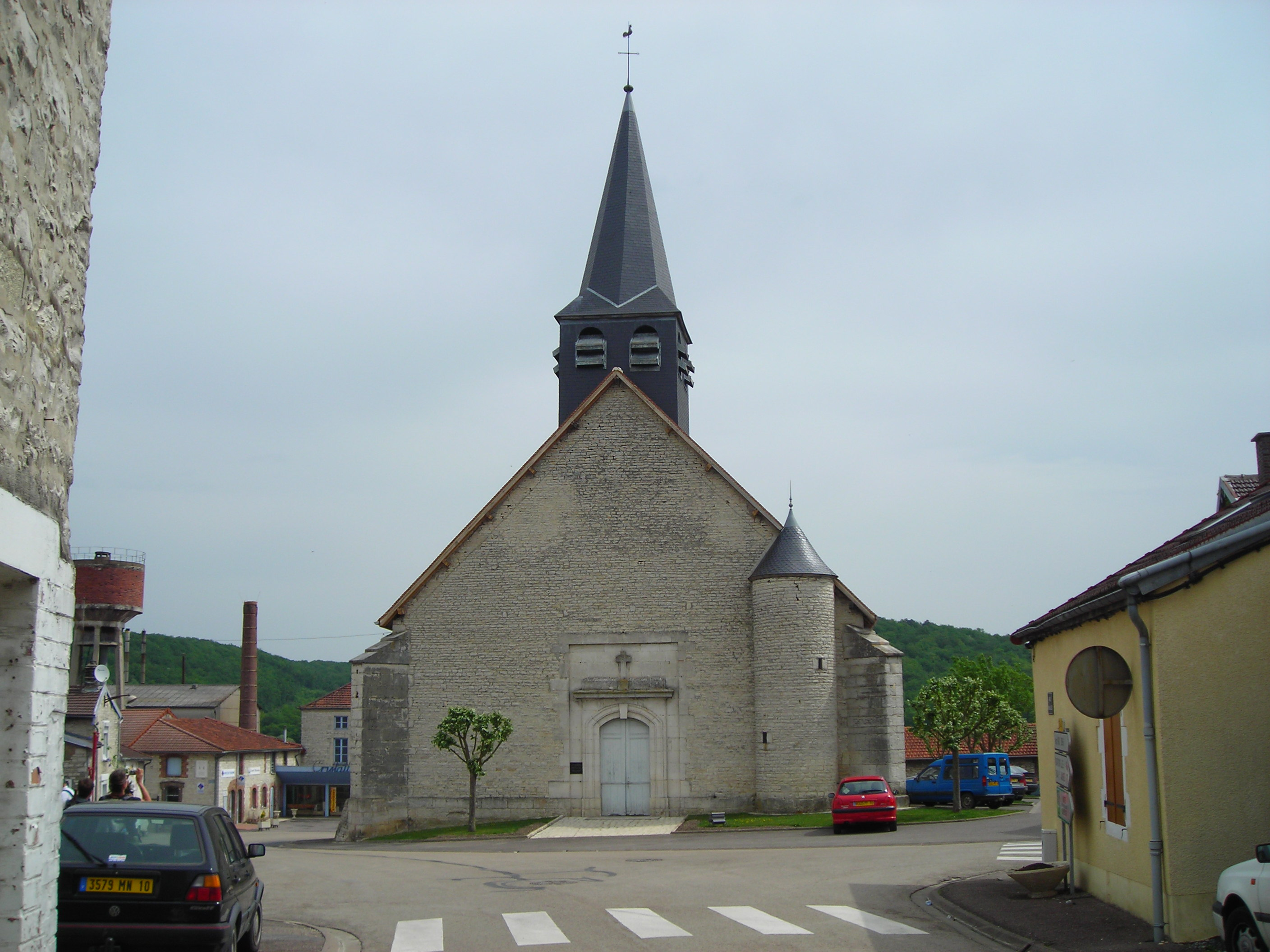
The Church of Saint Martin

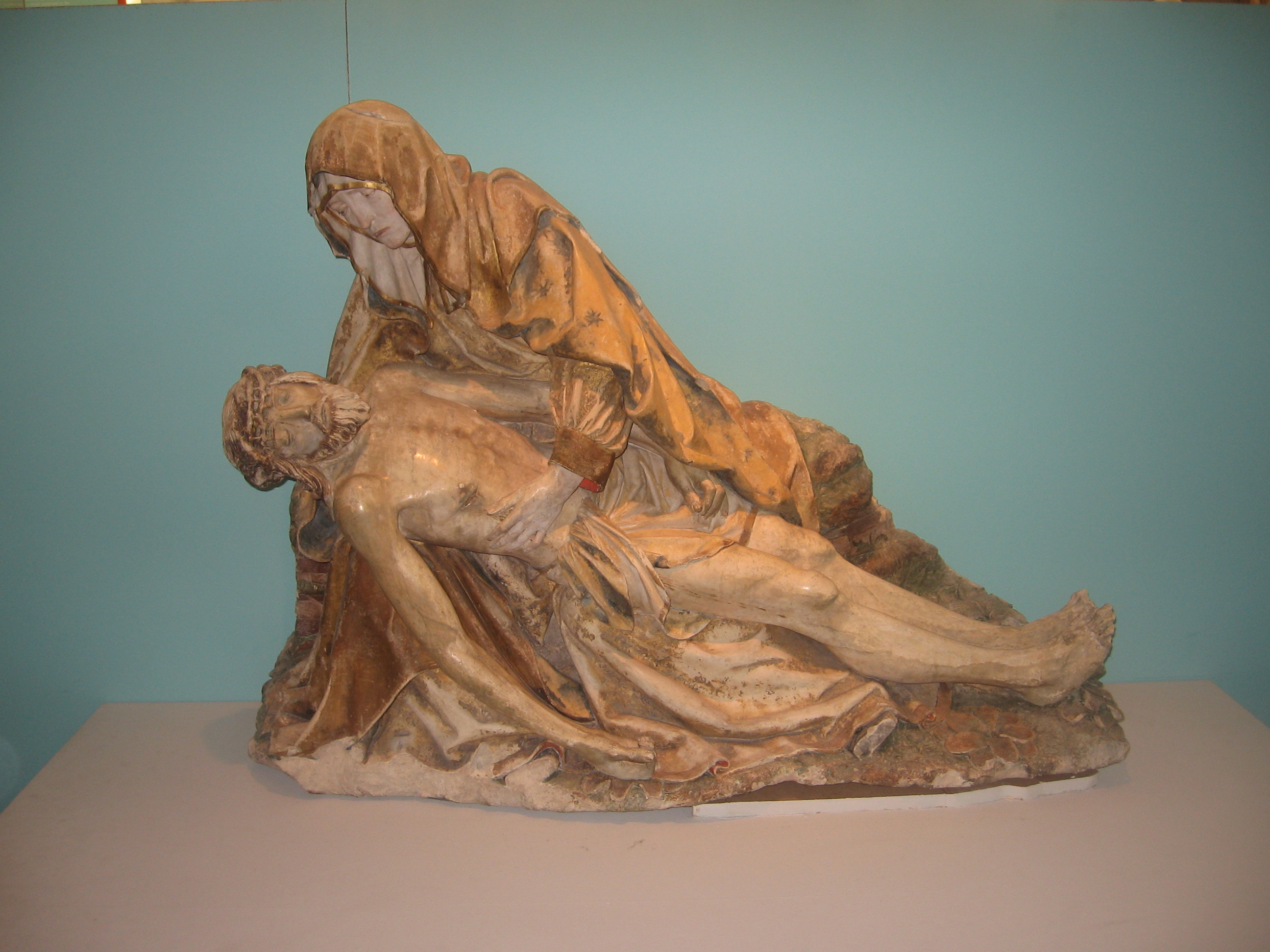
The Virgin of Pity Statue

- The Parish Church of Saint Martin contains a large number of objects that are registered as historical objects.

== Notable people ==
- Jean-Louis Coustillet - (1943 – 2021) a football player and coach was born here.

== See also ==
- Communes of the Aube department
