= Yahaya Médard =

Comorian footballer

Personal information
- Date of birth: 14 January 2000 (age 26)
- Place of birth: Le Blanc-Mesnil, France
- Height: 1.88 m (6 ft 2 in)
- Position: Centre-back

Team information
- Current team: Blois Football 41
- Number: 21

Youth career
- 2009–2016: Blanc-Mesnil
- 2016–2017: Paris FC
- 2018–2021: Le Mans

Senior career*
Years	Team	Apps	(Gls)
2017–2020	Angers II	6	(0)
2020–2022	FC 93	15	(0)
2022–2023	Vierzon	21	(0)
2023–2024	Aubervilliers	12	(0)
2024–2025	ASVH	23	(0)
2025–	Blois Football 41	2	(0)

International career^{‡}
2018	France U18	3	(0)
2023–	Comoros	3	(0)
- * Club domestic league appearances and goals as of 16:29, 12 September 2025 (UTC) ‡ National team caps and goals as of 16:29, 12 September 2025 (UTC)

Yahaya Médard (born 14 January 2000) is a professional footballer who plays as a centre-back for the Championnat National 1 club Blois Football 41. Born in France, he plays for the Comoros national team.

== Club career ==
Médard is a product of the youth academies of the French clubs Blanc-Mesnil and Paris FC, before moving to Angers in 2017 where he made his debut with their reserves. In 2020, he moved to FC 93 where he started playing senior football. For the 2022–23 season he moved to Vierzon, where they went to the round of 16 in the Coupe de France. In the summer of 2023, he moved to Aubervilliers, followed by a move with ASVH the following season. On 24 June 2025, he joined Blois Football 41.

== International career ==
Born in France, Médard is of Comorian descent and holds dual French-Comorian citizenship. He was first called up to the Comoros national team for a set of 2026 FIFA World Cup qualification matches in November 2023.
