= Macauley Chrisantus =

Nigerian footballer

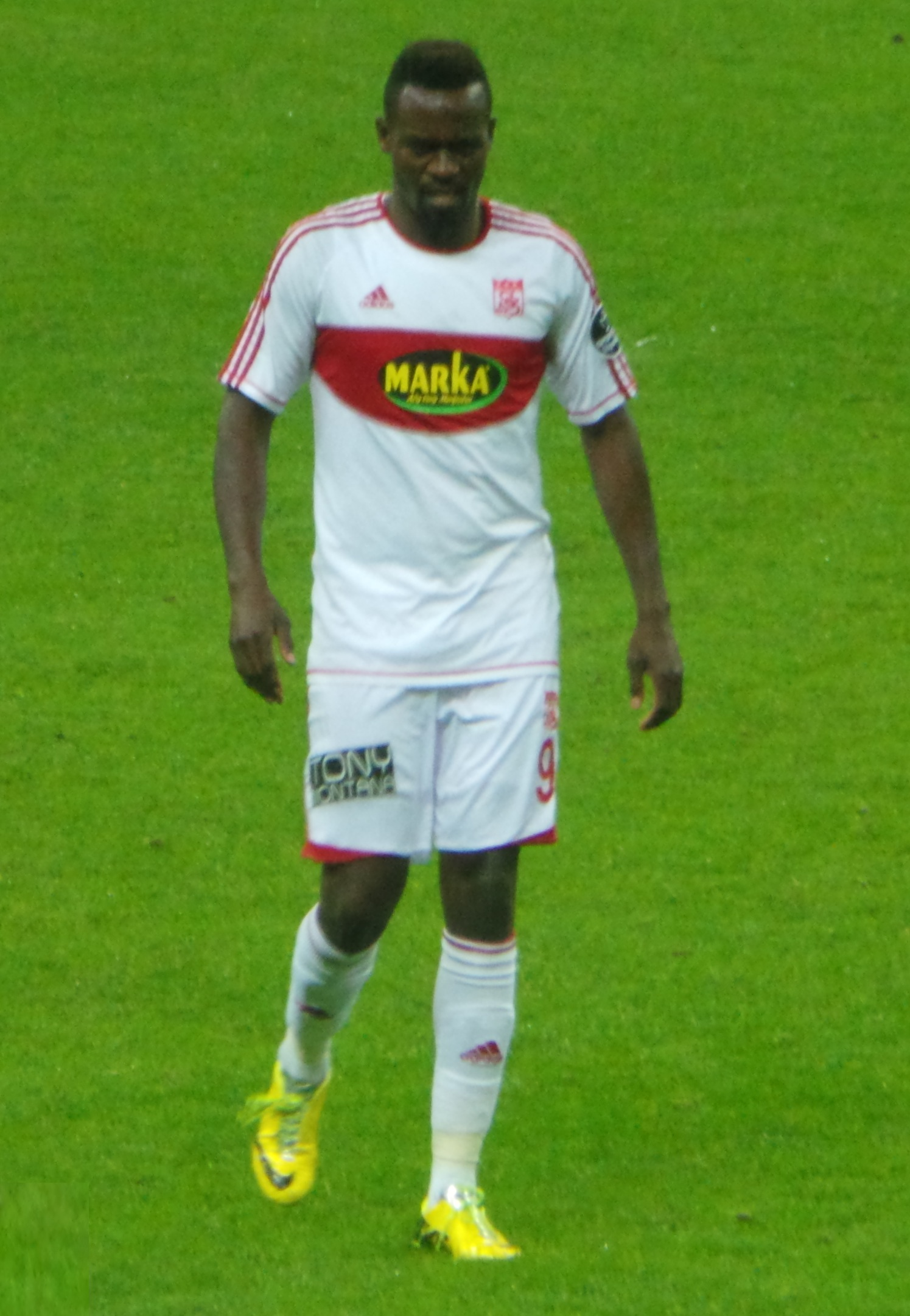
- Chrisantus in 2014

Personal information
- Full name: Macauley Chrisantus
- Date of birth: 20 August 1990 (age 36)
- Place of birth: Abuja, Nigeria
- Height: 1.83 m (6 ft 0 in)
- Position: Forward

Youth career
- –2007: Hearts of Abuja
- 2007–2008: Hamburger SV

Senior career*
Years	Team	Apps	(Gls)
2008–2009	Hamburger SV II	12	(4)
2008–2012	Hamburger SV	0	(0)
2009–2011	→ Karlsruher SC (loan)	47	(11)
2011–2012	→ FSV Frankfurt (loan)	26	(8)
2012–2014	Las Palmas	67	(20)
2014–2015	Sivasspor	8	(1)
2015–2016	AEK Athens	15	(2)
2016–2017	Reus	9	(0)
2017	Lamia	0	(0)
2018	Real Murcia	16	(6)
2018	HJK Helsinki	9	(0)
2019	Conquense	13	(1)
2019	Zob Ahan	5	(1)
2020	Hetten	0	(0)
2021	FF Jaro	21	(3)
2022	Tamaraceite	7	(0)
2022	Aprilia Racing Club	3	(0)
2023	Lynx	9	(6)

International career
2007	Nigeria U17	7	(7)
-2010	Nigeria U20	4	(1)
- * Club domestic league appearances and goals as of 16:48, 21 April 2023 (UTC)

Macauley Chrisantus (born 20 August 1990) is a Nigerian professional footballer who last played as a striker for Lynx.

== Career ==
Born in Abuja, Chrisantus joined Hamburger SV in 2007 from Abuja, after attracting offers from several major European clubs, probably due to his contribution to Nigeria's World Junior Cup win that year as the highest goal scorer and second best player of the tournament. In summer 2009, he was loaned to Karlsruher SC for the 2009–10 season, but on 15 April 2010, KSC extended the loan deal for another year.

On 21 July 2014, Chrisantus signed a three-year contract with Turkish Süper Lig side Sivasspor after his two successful years at Las Palmas in Spain.

In January 2015, Chrisantus signed with Greek side AEK Athens on an 18 months deal with an option of a further two years based on performance. On 4 October 2015, in the sixth day of the Super League Greece with eight minutes left he netted his first and winning goal against Atromitos after converting from close range. After being linked to a possible release in January, he only left the club at the end of the season, as his contract expired.

On 6 July 2016, Chrisantus signed a one-year deal with Reus Deportiu, returning to Spain two years after departing Las Palmas. On 12 September 2017 he returned to the Super League joining newly promoted side Lamia. However, on 12 December 2017, after only playing in two matches he dissolved his contract with the club.

After signing for HJK Helsinki in July 2018, he left the club again at the end of the year.

== International career ==
Chrisantus has represented Nigeria U17, and was the top scorer at the 2007 FIFA U-17 World Cup in Korea with seven goals, and was awarded the adidas Silver Ball. He scored all seven goals with his right foot.

== Career statistics ==
As of match played 15 January 2018

Appearances and goals by club, season and competition
Club	Season	League			National Cup		Other		Total	
Club	Season	Division	Apps	Goals	Apps	Goals	Apps	Goals	Apps	Goals
Hamburg II	2007–08	Regionalliga Nord	12	4	—		—		12	4
Karlsruher SC (loan)	2009–10	2. Bundesliga	25	3	1	0	—		26	3
Karlsruher SC (loan)	2010–11	2. Bundesliga	22	8	0	0	—		22	8
Karlsruher SC (loan)	Total		47	11	1	0	0	0	48	11
FSV Frankfurt (loan)	2011–12	2. Bundesliga	26	8	1	0	—		27	8
Las Palmas	2012–13	Segunda División	42	12	5	1	—		47	13
Las Palmas	2013–14	Segunda División	25	8	3	1	—		28	9
Las Palmas	Total		67	20	8	2	0	0	75	22
Sivasspor	2014–15	Süper Lig	8	1	4	0	—		12	1
AEK Athens	2014–15	Football League	16	6	1	0	—		17	6
AEK Athens	2015–16	Super League Greece	8	1	2	1	—		10	2
AEK Athens	Total		24	7	3	1	0	0	27	8
Reus Deportiu	2016–17	Segunda División	9	0	0	0	—		9	0
Lamia	2017–18	Super League Greece	0	0	2	0	—		2	0
Career total			193	51	19	3	0	0	212	54

== Honours ==
AEK Athens

- Football League: 2014–15 South Group
- Greek Cup: 2015–16

Nigeria U17

- FIFA U-17 World Cup: 2007

Individual

- FIFA U-17 World Cup Golden Shoe: 2007
- FIFA U-17 World Cup Silver Ball: 2007
