= Konstantinos Tegousis =

Greek footballer

Personal information
- Date of birth: 8 August 1991 (age 35)
- Place of birth: Agrinio, Greece
- Height: 1.73 m (5 ft 8 in)
- Position: Midfielder

Team information
- Current team: Tilikratis
- Number: 10

Youth career
- Egaleo

Senior career*
Years	Team	Apps	(Gls)
2010–2012	Egaleo		
2010	→ Kallithea (loan)	17	(0)
2012–2013	Mandraikos		
2013	Proodeftiki	10	(0)
2013–2015	Fostiras	43	(0)
2015–2016	Kallithea	40	(0)
2016–2017	Agrotikos Asteras	23	(4)
2017–2018	Trikala	1	(0)
2018	Ethnikos Piraeus		
2018–2019	Chania	17	(0)
2019–2020	Trikala	18	(0)
2020	Nafpaktiakos Asteras	0	(0)
2021–	Ierapetra	12	(0)
- * Club domestic league appearances and goals as of 17 April 2021

Konstantinos Tegousis (Greek: Κωνσταντίνος Τεγούσης; born 8 August 1991) is a Greek professional footballer who plays as a midfielder for Super League 2 club Tilikratis.
