= Dorian Chiotti =

Mauritian footballer

Personal information
- Full name: Dorian Claude Édouard Chiotti
- Date of birth: 16 August 1998 (age 28)
- Place of birth: Beaumont, France
- Height: 1.87 m (6 ft 2 in)
- Position: Goalkeeper

Team information
- Current team: Blois
- Number: 1

Youth career
- AS Montferrand

Senior career*
Years	Team	Apps	(Gls)
2016–2018	Cournon-d'Auvergne	2	(0)
2018–2021	Chamalières	21	(0)
2021–2022	Andrézieux-Bouthéon	16	(0)
2022–2023	Louhans-Cuiseaux	3	(0)
2023–2024	Chamalières	23	(0)
2024–2025	Hostert	28	(0)
2025–	Blois	9	(0)

International career^{‡}
2023–	Mauritius	9	(0)
- * Club domestic league appearances and goals as of 5 December 2025 ‡ National team caps and goals as of 17:15, 27 August 2025 (UTC)

Dorian Claude Édouard Chiotti (born 16 August 1998) is a Mauritian professional footballer who plays as a goalkeeper for Blois. Born in France, he plays for the Mauritius national team.

== Club career ==
A youth product of AS Montferrand, Chiotti began his senior career with Cournon-d'Auvergne in 2016. In 2018 he joined Chamalières in the Championnat National 3, helping them win their league and earned promotion to the Championnat National 2. On 19 June 2021, he transferred to Andrézieux-Bouthéon. On 7 July 2022, he transferred to Louhans-Cuiseaux. He returned to Chamalières on 31 January 2023 after limited opportunities with Louhans-Cuiseaux. On 28 May 2024, he the newly promoted club Hostert in the Luxembourg National Division. On 16 July 2025, he transferred to Blois returning to the Championnat National 2.

== International career ==
Born in France, Chiotti is of Mauritian descent and holds dual French-Mauritian citizenship. He debuted with the Mauritius national team in a 3–0 2026 FIFA World Cup qualification loss to Cameroon on 17 November 2023.
