= Balu (footballer, born 1985) =

Brazilian footballer (born 1985)

Personal information
- Full name: Fábio Vieira Amaro
- Date of birth: 22 February 1985 (age 41)
- Place of birth: Brazil
- Height: 1.88 m (6 ft 2 in)
- Position: Midfielder

Senior career*
Years	Team	Apps	(Gls)
–2005	Corinthians-AL		
2005–2012	Marítimo	7	(0)
2005–2009	→ Marítimo B (loan)	99	(5)
2009–2010	→ Portimonense (loan)	23	(2)
2010–2011	→ Belenenses (loan)	13	(2)
2011	→ Trikala (loan)	7	(0)
2011–2012	→ Panthrakikos (loan)	22	(2)
2012–2013	Pafos	11	(1)
2013	→ Bravos de Maquis (loan)		
2014–2015	Panachaiki	26	(3)
2015	Panserraikos	9	(1)
2016	Lamia	14	(0)
2016–2017	Chalkida		
2017–2018	Vilafranquense	22	(2)
2018–2019	Fátima	16	(1)
2019	FC Setúbal	4	(0)
2020	Comércio e Indústria		
2020–	Alta de Lisboa	44	(2)
- * Club domestic league appearances and goals

Fábio Vieira Amaro (born 22 February 1985) is a Brazilian footballer who plays as a midfielder for Alta de Lisboa.

== Early life ==
Balu is the son of Levi Procino Amaro and Rosalina Vieira Amaro. He has four siblings.

== Career ==
Balu started his career with Brazilian side Corinthians-AL. In 2005, he signed for Portuguese side Marítimo. In 2009, he was sent on loan to Portuguese side Portimonense. In 2010, he was sent on loan to Portuguese side Belenenses. In 2011, he was sent on loan to Greek side Trikala. After that, he was sent on loan to Greek side Panthrakikos. In 2012, he signed for Cypriot side Pafos. In 2013, he was sent on loan to Angolan side Bravos de Maquis. In 2014, he signed for Greek side Panachaiki. In 2015, he signed for Greek side Panserraikos. In 2016, he signed for Greek side Lamia. After that, he signed for Greek side Chalkida. He was regarded as one of the club's most important players. In 2017, he signed for Portuguese side Vilafranquense. In 2018, he signed for Portuguese side Fátima. In 2019, he signed for Portuguese side FC Setúbal. In 2020, he signed for Portuguese side Comércio e Indústria. After that, he signed for Portuguese side Alta de Lisboa.

== Style of play ==
Balu mainly operates as a midfielder. He was described as "responsible for setting up offensive moves and with great marking technique".
