= Christos Niaros =

Greek footballer

Personal information
- Date of birth: 20 February 1990 (age 36)
- Place of birth: Athens, Greece
- Height: 1.71 m (5 ft 7 in)
- Position: Left-back

Team information
- Current team: Fiki

Youth career
- 1999–2004: Ilioupoli

Senior career*
Years	Team	Apps	(Gls)
2004–2011	Ilioupoli	65	(3)
2011–2012	Doxa Drama	0	(0)
2012	Korinthos	15	(1)
2012–2015	Acharnaikos	63	(3)
2015–2017	Trikala	21	(0)
2017	Ergotelis	15	(0)
2017–2018	Sparta	26	(0)
2018–2023	Trikala	80	(1)
- * Club domestic league appearances and goals as of 16 April 2022

Christos Niaros (Greek: Χρήστος Νιάρος; born 20 February 1990) is a Greek professional footballer who plays as a left-back for Super League 2 club Trikala, which he also captains.
