= Eric Warden =

Ghanaian footballer

Personal information
- Full name: Eric Wuardom Warden
- Date of birth: 13 December 1992 (age 33)
- Place of birth: Accra, Ghana
- Height: 1.82 m (6 ft 0 in)
- Position: Winger

Youth career
- Celta

Senior career*
Years	Team	Apps	(Gls)
2011–2012	Celta B	10	(2)
2012–2014	Fokikos	27	(11)
2013–2014	Levadiakos	4	(0)
2014–2015	Iraklis Psachna	26	(6)
2015–2016	Olympiacos Volos	11	(2)
2016	OFI	0	(0)
2016–2017	Kallithea	25	(3)
2017–2018	Sparti	24	(1)
2019	Luftëtari Gjirokastër	3	(0)
2019–2020	Almopos Aridea		
2020–2022	Aris Skalas		
2022–2023	Ermis Meligous		
2023–2024	Pangytheatikos		
- * Club domestic league appearances and goals as of 12:01, 18 October 2024 (UTC)

Eric Warden (born 13 December 1992) is a Ghanaian footballer who most recently played for Luftëtari Gjirokastër FC.
