= Dimitrios Souanis =

Greek footballer

Personal information
- Full name: Dimitrios Souanis
- Date of birth: 17 November 1985 (age 40)
- Place of birth: Halkidiki, Greece
- Height: 1.78 m (5 ft 10 in)
- Positions: Right winger; striker

Youth career
- 2001: Panionios

Senior career*
| Years | Team | Apps | (Gls) |
| 2002–2003 | Panionios | 6 | (0) |
| 2003–2005 | Olympiacos Volos | 4 | (0) |
| 2005–2008 | Panthrakikos | 79 | (13) |
| 2008–2012 | Skoda Xanthi | 87 | (10) |
| 2012–2013 | Apollon Limassol | 27 | (2) |
| 2013–2014 | Kerkyra | 34 | (8) |
| 2014–2015 | AEL | 6 | (0) |
| 2015 | Apollon Smyrnis | 16 | (2) |
| 2015–2016 | Kerkyra | 26 | (3) |
| 2016–2017 | Doxa Drama | 0 | (0) |
| 2017–2018 | Diagoras | 1 | (1) |
| 2018–2019 | Triglia | 0 | (0) |
- * Club domestic league appearances and goals as of 11 October 2017

Dimitrios Souanis (Greek: Δημήτριος Σουάνης; born 17 November 1985) is a Greek footballer.

Souanis began his professional football career with Panionios in 2002.

== Career stats ==
| season | club | league | Championship | | Nation cup | | Europe cup | | Total | |
| season | club | league | appear | goals | appear | goals | appear | goals | appear | goals |
| 2002–03 | Panionios | Alpha Ethniki | 6 | 0 | 0 | 0 | 0 | 0 | 6 | 0 |
| 2003–04 | Olympiacos Volos | Beta Ethniki | 4 | 0 | 0 | 0 | 0 | 0 | 4 | 0 |
| 2004–05 | Kefallonia F.C. | Delta Ethniki | 19 | 8 | 0 | 0 | 0 | 0 | 19 | 8 |
| 2005–06 | Panthrakikos | Gamma Ethniki | 26 | 1 | 2 | 1 | 0 | 0 | 28 | 2 |
| 2006–07 | Panthrakikos | Beta Ethniki | 29 | 4 | 2 | 1 | 0 | 0 | 31 | 5 |
| 2007–08 | Panthrakikos | Beta Ethniki | 24 | 8 | 0 | 0 | 0 | 0 | 24 | 8 |
| 2008–09 | Skoda Xanthi | Super League Greece | 22 | 4 | 2 | 0 | 0 | 0 | 24 | 4 |
| 2009–10 | Skoda Xanthi | Super League Greece | 22 | 2 | 1 | 0 | 0 | 0 | 23 | 2 |
| 2010–11 | Skoda Xanthi | Super League Greece | 23 | 2 | 1 | 0 | 0 | 0 | 24 | 2 |
| 2011–12 | Skoda Xanthi | Super League Greece | 20 | 2 | 2 | 0 | 0 | 0 | 22 | 2 |
| 2012–13 | Apollon Limassol | Cypriot First Division | 27 | 2 | 3 | 0 | 0 | 0 | 30 | 2 |
| 2013–14 | Kerkyra | Football League | 34 | 8 | 3 | 0 | 0 | 0 | 37 | 8 |
| career total | | | 256 | 41 | 16 | 2 | 0 | 0 | 272 | 43 |

Last update: 5 December 2014
