= Panagiotis Zonas =

Greek association footballer

Personal information
- Date of birth: 19 February 1984 (age 42)
- Place of birth: Lamia, Greece
- Height: 1.86 m (6 ft 1 in)
- Position: Centre-back

Team information
- Current team: Aspropyrgos
- Number: 5

Senior career*
Years	Team	Apps	(Gls)
–2005	Lamia		
2005–2006	Levadiakos		
2006–2008	Panargiakos		
2008–2009	Rouf		
2009	Vyzas		
2009–2012	Thrasyvoulos	50	(2)
2012	Aiolikos		
2012–2013	PAEEK		
2013–2014	Doxa Vyronas		
2014	Glyfada	8	(0)
2014–2015	Acharnaikos	33	(0)
2015–2016	Trikala	22	(0)
2016–2017	Olympiacos Volos		
2017–2018	Rodos		
2018–	Aspropyrgos	18	(0)
- * Club domestic league appearances and goals as of 13:30, 27 March 2020 (UTC)

Panagiotis Zonas (Greek: Παναγιώτης Ζώνας; born 19 February 1984) is a Greek professional footballer who plays as a centre-back for Football League club Aspropyrgos, for which he is captain.

== Club career ==
Born in Lamia, Greece, Zonas made his senior debut with Greece side Thrasyvoulos, in the 2009–10 season and had the contract with the club until July, 2012. On 1 July 2012, he joined Aiolikos. He profoundly played for Greek clubs.

Initially signed by the Greek club Lamia, he had no appearance for the senior squad and followed a transfer to Levadiakos in 2005. He then signed a contract of one year with Greek club playing in Greece namely Panargiakos and remained for the club until 2008. In the mid of 2008 Zonas signed a year spell with the Greece side Rouf and in 2009 he was at Vyzas. Until 2009 he had no major impact. Zonas penned a deal with Greek club Thrasyvoulos securing major 55 appearances for the club and netted the ball twice. The Greek gained a decent momentum for having long-enough period that he appeared for the club.

He then moved to Aiolikos in 2012 and a transfer to Cypriot Second Division side PAEEK followed whereby he remained until 2013.This was the first ever time that Zonas has moved out of the home-nation in order to pursue senior-career.

He returned to Greece and played for Attican side Doxa Vyronas and further moved to Glyfada in 2014 where the defender earned 8 caps for the club. In 2014, he moved to Acharnaikos F.C. and played a fabulous 33 games whereby the defender made a huge rise in market value.

The Greek was transferred to Trikala and the fame rose. He played for Trikala, considerable, 22 games.

Zonas moved to Olympiacos Volos and Rodos in 2017 and 2018 respectively. Finally Panagiotis is playing in Greece for Aspropyrgos also acting as a skipper of the side.

Meanwhile, he had also appeared in Greek Football Cup or Kypello Elladas (Greek).
