= Ablaye Yare Faye =

Senegalese footballer (born 1994)

Personal information
- Date of birth: 10 April 1994 (age 32)
- Place of birth: Senegal
- Height: 1.84 m (6 ft 0 in)
- Position: Defensive midfielder

Team information
- Current team: Fos

Senior career*
Years	Team	Apps	(Gls)
2011–2012	Virtus Oratorio		
2012–2014	Kallithea	44	(5)
2014–2016	AEK Athens	11	(0)
2016	→ Trikala (loan)	5	(0)
2017–2018	Granville	18	(1)
2019	Aves	2	(0)
2020–2021	Athlético Marseille	28	(0)
2022–2023	Saint-Apollinaire	28	(0)
2023–	Fos	12	(0)

International career
2015	Senegal U23	1	(0)
- * Club domestic league appearances and goals as of 7 December 2024

Ablaye Yare Faye (born 10 April 1994) is a Senegalese footballer who plays as a defensive midfielder for French Championnat National 3 club Fos.

== Club career ==
In 2012, Faye started his career at professional football at Kallithea. He made 22 appearances scoring 3 goals for the club in the Greek Football League.

In 2013, Ablaye Faye signed a three-year contract with AEK Athens which would keep him at the club until 2017.

In January 2022, Faye signed for French club Saint-Apollinaire.

== Honours ==
AEK Athens

- Football League: 2015
