= Guy Tapé =

Ivorian footballer (born 1992)

Personal information
- Full name: Guy Bade Tapé
- Date of birth: 13 May 1992 (age 34)
- Place of birth: Abidjan, Ivory Coast
- Height: 1.86 m (6 ft 1 in)
- Position: Defensive midfielder

Team information
- Current team: Blois
- Number: 5

Youth career
- 2006–2009: Clermont
- 2009–2011: Paris FC

Senior career*
| Years | Team | Apps | (Gls) |
| 2011 | Paris FC | 1 | (0) |
| 2011–2013 | Rouen B | 16 | (0) |
| 2012 | Rouen | 1 | (0) |
| 2013–2014 | Martigues | 5 | (0) |
| 2014–2015 | Ermionida | 24 | (1) |
| 2015–2016 | Al-Shabab Manama | | |
| 2016–2018 | Rodange | 47 | (1) |
| 2018–2019 | Châteaubriant | 24 | (1) |
| 2019–2020 | Épinal | 15 | (0) |
| 2020–2021 | FC 93 | 3 | (0) |
| 2021–2022 | Beauvais | 5 | (0) |
| 2022–2023 | Haguenau | 36 | (1) |
| 2023–2024 | Delémont | 17 | (2) |
| 2025– | Blois | 4 | (0) |
- * Club domestic league appearances and goals as of 5 December 2025

Guy Bade Tapé (born 13 May 1992) is an Ivorian professional footballer who plays as a defensive midfielder for French Championnat National 1 club Blois.

== Career ==
In January 2022, Tapé signed for Championnat National 2 side Haguenau.

== Personal life ==
Born in Ivory Coast, Tapé has both French and Ivorian citizenship.
