= Georgios Iordanidis (midfielder) =

Greek footballer

Personal information
- Full name: Georgios Iordanidis
- Date of birth: 28 March 1989 (age 37)
- Place of birth: Giannitsa, Greece
- Height: 1.72 m (5 ft 7 1/2 in)
- Position: Midfielder

Team information
- Current team: Kozani

Senior career*
| Years | Team | Apps | (Gls) |
| 2006–2008 | Anagennisi Giannitsa | 2 | (0) |
| 2008–2009 | Niki Polygyros | 25 | (6) |
| 2009–2011 | Anagennisi Giannitsa | 54 | (15) |
| 2011 | Aetos Skydra | 5 | (2) |
| 2012 | Anagennisi Giannitsa | 29 | (6) |
| 2013 | Panetolikos | 17 | (1) |
| 2013 | Pierikos | 14 | (2) |
| 2014–2015 | Acharnaikos | 32 | (7) |
| 2015–2016 | Aiolikos | 14 | (3) |
| 2016 | Niki Volos | 15 | (6) |
| 2016–2017 | Pydna Kitrous | 22 | (6) |
| 2017–2020 | Niki Volos | 27 | (3) |
| 2020–2021 | Iraklis | 11 | (3) |
| 2021–2022 | Kozani | 20 | (7) |

International career
| 2007 | Greece U-19 | 3 | (0) |
- * Club domestic league appearances and goals as of 01:56, 31 August 2020 (UTC)

Georgios Iordanidis (Greek: Γεώργιος Ιορδανίδης; born 28 March 1989) is a Greek professional footballer who plays as a midfielder for Kozani.

== Career ==
Born in Giannitsa, Iordanidis began playing football with local side Anagennisi Giannitsa.
