= Montluçon Football =

French football club

Montluçon
- Full name: Montluçon Football
- Founded: 1934; 92 years ago (as ÉDS Montluçon); 2011 (as IEF Montluçon)
- Ground: Stade Dunlop; Stade des Ilets
- Capacity: Stade Dunlop: 3,200; Stade des Ilets: 400
- President: Christophe Decoster
- Manager: Mickaël Bessaque
- League: Régional 1 Auvergne-Rhône-Alpes
- 2022–23: National 3 Group M, 14th (relegated)
- Website: https://montluconfootball.fr/
Home colours

Montluçon Football is a French football club based in Montluçon. They compete in Régional 1, the sixth tier of French football.

The club was formerly known as Étoile des Sports Montluçonnais Football from 1934 to 2011 before dissolving due to financial issues. It was reformed in that same year as Ilets Étoile Football Montluçon before taking its current name of Montluçon Football in 2014.

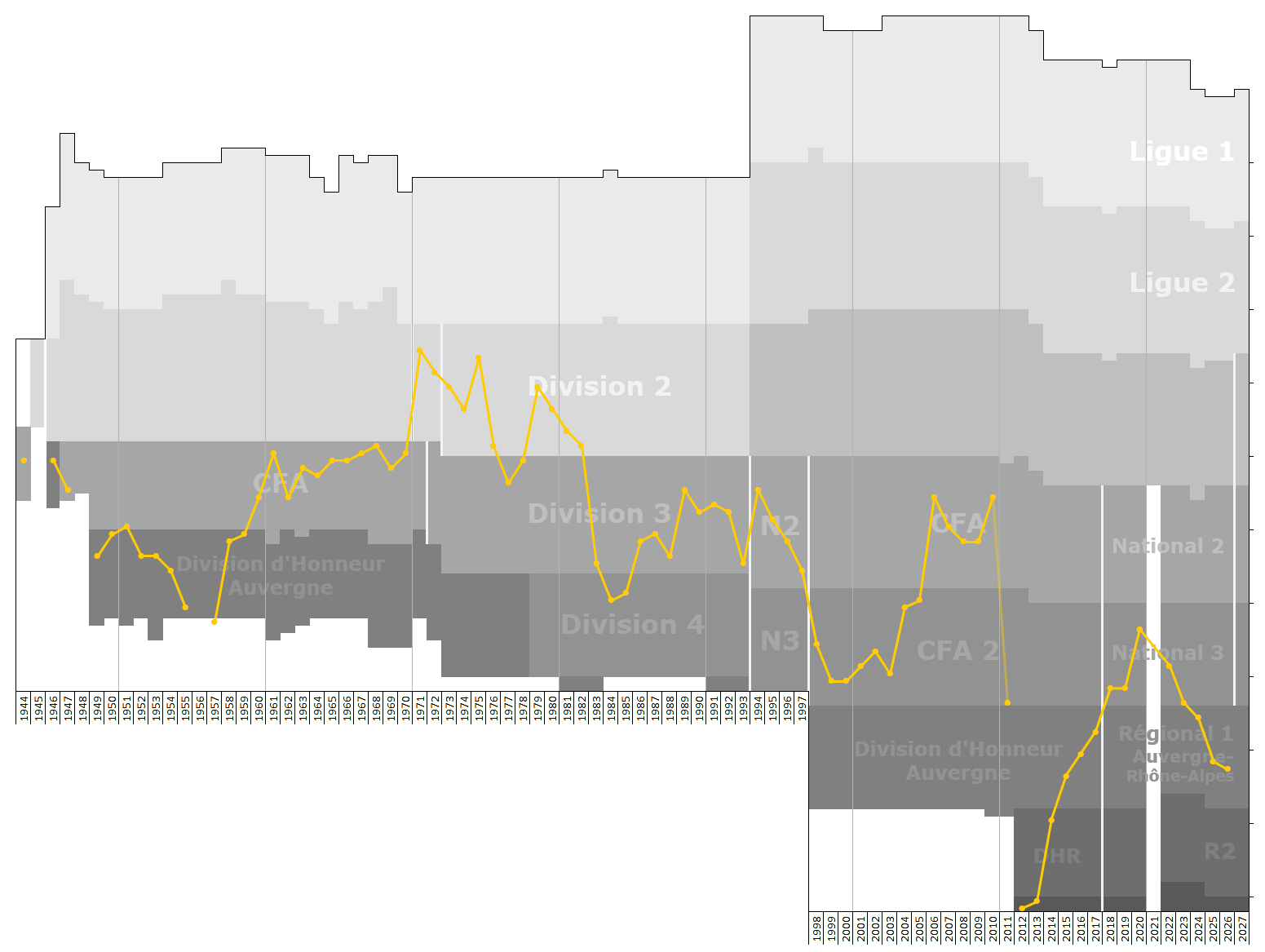
Historical league performance chart of Montluçon Football

== Honours ==
- Division d'Honneur Auvergne: 1946–47, 1949–50, 1958–59, 1972–73
- Championnat de France Amateur Group Southwest: 1967–68
- Division 3 Group Centre: 1977–78
- Promotion d'Honneur Auvergne: 2012–13
- Coupe d'Allier: 2016–17

== Season to season ==
| Saison | Div. | clas. | Pts | M.J. | Vic. | Nuls | Déf. | B.P. | B.C. | D.B. | Coupe de France | Coupe de la Ligue |
|---|---|---|---|---|---|---|---|---|---|---|---|---|
| 1934/1935 | District-D3 | – | – | – | – | – | – | – | – | – | – | – |
| 1935/1936 | – | – | – | – | – | – | – | – | – | – | – | – |
| 1936/1937 | – | – | – | – | – | – | – | – | – | – | – | – |
| 1937/1938 | District-D2 | – | – | – | – | – | – | – | – | – | – | – |
| 1938/1939 | District-D2 | 1 | – | – | – | – | – | – | – | – | – | – |
| 1939/1940 | District-D1 | – | – | – | – | – | – | – | – | – | – | – |
| 1940/1941 | – | – | – | – | – | – | – | – | – | – | – | – |
| 1941/1942 | – | – | – | – | – | – | – | – | – | – | – | – |
| 1942/1943 | – | – | – | – | – | – | – | – | – | – | – | – |
| 1943/1944 | – | – | – | – | – | – | – | – | – | – | – | – |
| 1944/1945 | – | – | – | – | – | – | – | – | – | – | – | – |
| 1945/1946 | DH-auvergne G.B | 3 | – | – | – | – | – | – | – | – | – | – |
| 1946/1947 | DH-auvergne | 1 | – | – | – | – | – | – | – | – | – | – |
| 1947/1948 | DH-auvergne | – | – | – | – | – | – | – | – | – | – | – |
| 1948/1949 | DH-auvergne | 4 | 56 | 24 | 13 | 6 | 5 | 64 | 30 | +34 | – | – |
| 1949/1950 | DH-auvergne | 1 | 54 | 22 | 14 | 4 | 4 | 46 | 27 | +19 | – | – |
| 1950/1951 | CFA-centre | 12 | – | – | – | – | – | – | – | – | – | – |
| 1951/1952 | DH-auvergne | 4 | 47 | 22 | 9 | 7 | 6 | 39 | 30 | +9 | – | – |
| 1952/1953 | DH-auvergne | 4 | 63 | 28 | 14 | 7 | 7 | 64 | 41 | +23 | – | – |
| 1953/1954 | DH-auvergne | 6 | 46 | 22 | 9 | 6 | 7 | 34 | 31 | +3 | – | – |
| 1954/1955 | DH-auvergne | 11 | 37 | 22 | 6 | 3 | 13 | 24 | 47 | −23 | – | – |
| 1955/1956 | – | – | – | – | – | – | – | – | – | – | – | – |
| 1956/1957 | – | – | – | – | – | – | – | – | – | – | – | – |
| 1957/1958 | DH-auvergne | 2 | 57 | 22 | 16 | 3 | 3 | 61 | 20 | +41 | – | – |
| 1958/1959 | DH-auvergne | 1 | 55 | 22 | 14 | 5 | 3 | 49 | 25 | +24 | – | – |
| 1959/1960 | CFA-sud ouest | 8 | – | – | – | – | – | – | – | – | – | – |
| 1960/1961 | CFA-sud ouest | 2 | 34 | 26 | 12 | 10 | 4 | 48 | 24 | +24 | – | – |
| 1961/1962 | CFA-sud ouest | 8 | 21 | 22 | 6 | 9 | 7 | 30 | 39 | −9 | – | – |
| 1962/1963 | CFA-sud ouest | 4 | 29 | 24 | 11 | 7 | 6 | 47 | 36 | +11 | – | – |
| 1963/1964 | CFA-centre | 2 | 23 | 22 | 8 | 7 | 7 | 40 | 23 | +17 | – | – |
| 1964/1965 | CFA-centre | 3 | 28 | 22 | 10 | 8 | 4 | 32 | 20 | +12 | – | – |
| 1965/1966 | CFA-centre | 3 | 29 | 22 | 13 | 3 | 6 | 45 | 29 | +16 | – | – |
| 1966/1967 | CFA-centre | 2 | 33 | 22 | 15 | 3 | 4 | 46 | 17 | +29 | 1/16 f. | – |
| 1967/1968 | CFA-centre | 1 | 45 | 26 | 19 | 7 | 0 | 80 | 16 | +64 | – | – |
| 1968/1969 | CFA-centre | 4 | 31 | 26 | 13 | 5 | 8 | 53 | 33 | +20 | 1/16 f. | – |
| 1969/1970 | CFA-centre | 2 | 36 | 26 | 15 | 6 | 5 | 59 | 28 | +31 | – | – |
| 1970/1971 | National-centre | 4 | 35 | 30 | 13 | 9 | 8 | 56 | 39 | +17 | 1/16 f. | – |
| 1971/1972 | D2-G.B | 7 | 32 | 30 | 12 | 8 | 10 | 46 | 49 | −3 | 1/8 f. | – |
| 1972/1973 | D2-G.B | 9 | 34 | 34 | 13 | 8 | 13 | 47 | 43 | +4 | 1/8 f. | – |
| 1973/1974 | D2-G.A | 12 | 33 | 34 | 11 | 5 | 18 | 52 | 61 | −9 | – | – |
| 1974/1975 | D2-G.B | 5 | 41 | 32 | 14 | 12 | 6 | 40 | 35 | +5 | 1/16 f. | – |
| 1975/1976 | D2-G.B | 17 | 27 | 34 | 8 | 9 | 17 | 36 | 57 | −21 | – | – |
| 1976/1977 | D3-centre | 4 | 38 | 30 | 16 | 6 | 8 | 58 | 33 | +15 | – | – |
| 1977/1978 | D3-P.A | 3 | 48 | 30 | 21 | 6 | 3 | 55 | 16 | +39 | – | – |
| 1978/1979 | D2-G.A | 9 | 33 | 34 | 10 | 13 | 11 | 36 | 35 | +1 | – | – |
| 1979/1980 | D2-G.B | 12 | 30 | 34 | 9 | 12 | 13 | 34 | 40 | −6 | – | – |
| 1980/1981 | D2-G.A | 15 | 25 | 34 | 10 | 5 | 19 | 29 | 53 | −14 | – | – |
| 1981/1982 | D2-G.B | 17 | 22 | 34 | 7 | 8 | 19 | 22 | 54 | −32 | 1/16 f. | – |
| 1982/1983 | D3-centre | 14 | 19 | 30 | 5 | 9 | 16 | 29 | 51 | −22 | – | – |
| 1983/1984 | D4-G.E | 4 | 33 | 26 | 14 | 5 | 7 | 55 | 30 | +25 | – | – |
| 1984/1985 | D4-G.E | 3 | 33 | 26 | 14 | 5 | 7 | 43 | 24 | +19 | – | – |
| 1985/1986 | D3-centre | 12 | 26 | 30 | 8 | 10 | 12 | 30 | 36 | −6 | – | – |
| 1986/1987 | D3-centre | 12 | 26 | 30 | 8 | 10 | 12 | 34 | 47 | −13 | – | – |
| 1987/1988 | D3-centre | 14 | 22 | −30 | 6 | 10 | 14 | 26 | 42 | −16 | – | – |
| 1988/1989 | D3-centre | 5 | 34 | 30 | 15 | 4 | 11 | 45 | 38 | +7 | 1/16 f. | – |
| 1989/1990 | D3-centre | 8 | 30 | 30 | 10 | 10 | 10 | 28 | 26 | +2 | – | – |
| 1990/1991 | D3-centre | 7 | 32 | 32 | 12 | 8 | 12 | 35 | 31 | +4 | – | – |
| 1991/1992 | D3-centre | 8 | 29 | 30 | 10 | 9 | 11 | 24 | 29 | −5 | 1/8 f. | – |
| 1992/1993 | D3-centre ouest | 15 | 22 | 30 | 7 | 8 | 15 | 26 | 42 | −16 | – | – |
| 1993/1994 | National2-G.B | 6 | 40 | 34 | 15 | 10 | 9 | 52 | 41 | +11 | – | – |
| 1994/1995 | National2-G.C | 9 | 36 | 34 | 12 | 12 | 10 | 38 | 34 | +4 | – | – |
| 1995/1996 | National2-G.C | 12 | 39 | 34 | 9 | 12 | 13 | 31 | 42 | −11 | – | – |
| 1996/1997 | National2-G.C | 16 | 35 | 34 | 9 | 8 | 17 | 42 | 70 | −28 | – | – |
| 1997/1998 | CFA2-G.F | 8 | 41 | 30 | 11 | 8 | 11 | 46 | 47 | −1 | 7th round | – |
| 1998/1999 | CFA2-G.C | 13 | 68 | 30 | 10 | 8 | 12 | 35 | 38 | −3 | – | – |
| 1999/2000 | CFA2-G.C | 13 | 63 | 30 | 7 | 12 | 11 | 53 | 52 | +1 | 8th round | – |
| 2000/2001 | CFA2-G.D | 10 | 66 | 30 | 9 | 9 | 12 | 34 | 35 | −1 | – | – |
| 2001/2002 | CFA2-G.D | 9 | 71 | 30 | 9 | 14 | 7 | 45 | 40 | +5 | – | – |
| 2002/2003 | CFA2-G.G | 12 | 66 | 30 | 8 | 13 | 9 | 35 | 33 | +2 | – | – |
| 2003/2004 | CFA2-G.D | 3 | 83 | 30 | 15 | 8 | 7 | 47 | 28 | +19 | 1/32 f. | – |
| 2004/2005 | CFA2-G.C | 2 | 83 | 30 | 15 | 8 | 7 | 50 | 24 | +26 | 8th round | – |
| 2005/2006 | CFA-G.C | 7 | 81 | 34 | 13 | 8 | 13 | 37 | 43 | −6 | 6th round | – |
| 2006/2007 | CFA-G.C | 10 | 79 | 34 | 10 | 15 | 9 | 37 | 33 | +4 | 8th round | |
| 2007/2008 | CFA-G.D | 12 | 76 | 34 | 9 | 15 | 10 | 44 | 37 | +7 | 1/32 f. | |
| 2008/2009 | CFA-G.C | 12 | 73 | 34 | 9 | 12 | 13 | 43 | 54 | −11 | 1/32 f. | |
| 2009/2010 | CFA-G.C | 6 | 86 | 34 | 14 | 10 | 10 | 45 | 36 | +9 | 7th round | |
| 2010/2011 | CFA2-G.G | 16 | 0 | 0 | 0 | 0 | 0 | 0 | 0 | 0 | | |
