= 2017–18 AEK Athens F.C. season =

AEK Athens
2017–18 season
- Chairman: Evangelos Aslanidis
- Manager: Manolo Jiménez
- Stadium: Athens Olympic Stadium
- Super League: 1st
- Greek Cup: Runners-up
- UEFA Champions League: Third qualifying round
- UEFA Europa League: Round of 32
- Top goalscorer: League: Sergio Araujo (11); All: Lazaros Christodoulopoulos (16)
- Highest home attendance: 50,141 (vs Levadiakos) (22 April 2018)
- Lowest home attendance: 4,102 (vs Lamia) (27 January 2018)
- Average home league attendance: 15,609
- Biggest win: Apollon Larissa 0–7 AEK Athens
- Biggest defeat: AEK Athens 0–2 CSKA Moscow; AEK Athens 0–2 PAOK; Asteras Tripolis 2–0 AEK Athens
Home colours	Away colours	Third colours

The 2017–18 season was the 94th season in the existence of AEK Athens F.C. and the 57th competitive season and third consecutive in the top flight of Greek football. They competed in the Super League, the Greek Cup, the Champions League and the UEFA Europa League. The season began on 25 July 2017 and finished on 12 May 2018.

== Kits ==
Supplier: Nike
Sponsor(s): Pame stoixima
Features: LG Corp

Home	Away	Third

== Overview ==
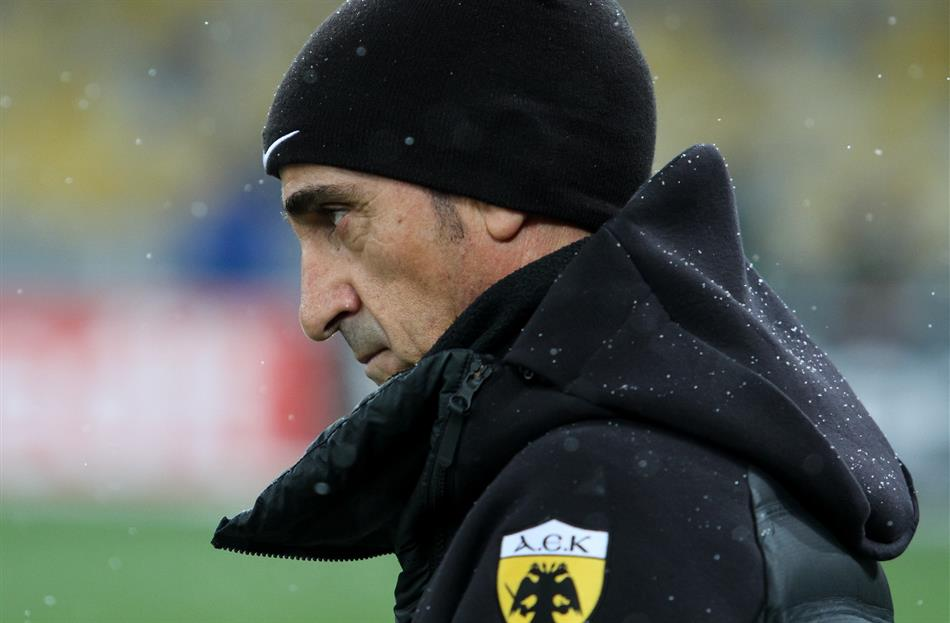
Manolo Jiménez

Having achieved a good previous season, AEK kept their main squad and with Manolo Jiménez on the bench, they made additions to strengthen the team. Having signed Panagiotis Tsintotas and Giorgos Giakoumakis from the previous season, the team also acquired Victor Klonaridis, who returned after 5 years, while from the international market they acquired Uroš Ćosić, as well as Hélder Lopes and Marko Livaja from Las Palmas, with the latter coming as a loan. The club also proceeded in the loan of the international Icelandic winger, Arnór Ingvi Traustason. Past players with great contribution in the previous years, such as Dimitrios Kolovetsios, Ronald Vargas, Christos Aravidis and Tomáš Pekhart left the team.

AEK began their competitive duties in the third qualifying round of the Champions League, where in a difficult draw they faced CSKA Moscow. The Russian team, having great experience from these types of matches and with a stable squad for many years, did not have any difficulties against the inexperienced AEK and with victories by 0–2 in Athens and by 1–0 in Moscow, they eliminated yellow-blacks from the dream of the participation in the Champions League, sending them to the play-off round of the Europa League. There, they got unlucky again, as they were drawn against the Belgian Club Brugge. However, this time the team appeared well-prepared against their opponent and in the first match at the Jan Breydel Stadium they easily held the 0–0, despite being down to 10 men during the second half. In the rematch at the Olympic Stadium, AEK in one of their best European appearances in recent years turned the qualifying event into a triumph, by winning with 3–0 and dominating their opponents throughout the match. Thus, AEK returned to the group stage of the Europa League after 6 years.

In the championship, AEK started equally well, making some additional changes to their roster. Initially, Dídac Vilà who had been in conflict with the management over the termination of his contract, eventually went to Espanyol and Hugo Almeida moved to Hajduk Split. On the last day of the transfer window, AEK managed to bring back on loan Sergio Araujo, who stood out in the last season, as the Argentine could not stay away from the team he was beloved and became the third player to come from Las Palmas during the transfer period. Furthermore, another comeback took place, this time with Panagiotis Kone returning after 9 years, as a loan from Udinese. The team appeared well worked in all their lines and were in contention for the championship from the start. The home win against Olympiacos, where despite their dominance, they conceded 2 goals against the flow of the match, but managed to overturn the score by winning 3–2 and the easy victory over PAOK with 1–0, despite being down to 10 men early in the game, stood out in the first round. While AEK continued with wins, they suffered some losses in games that came close to European games, losing two key players along the way, with the captain, Petros Mantalos, as well as Jakob Johansson, suffering a cruciate ligament injury and practically staying out the rest of the season.

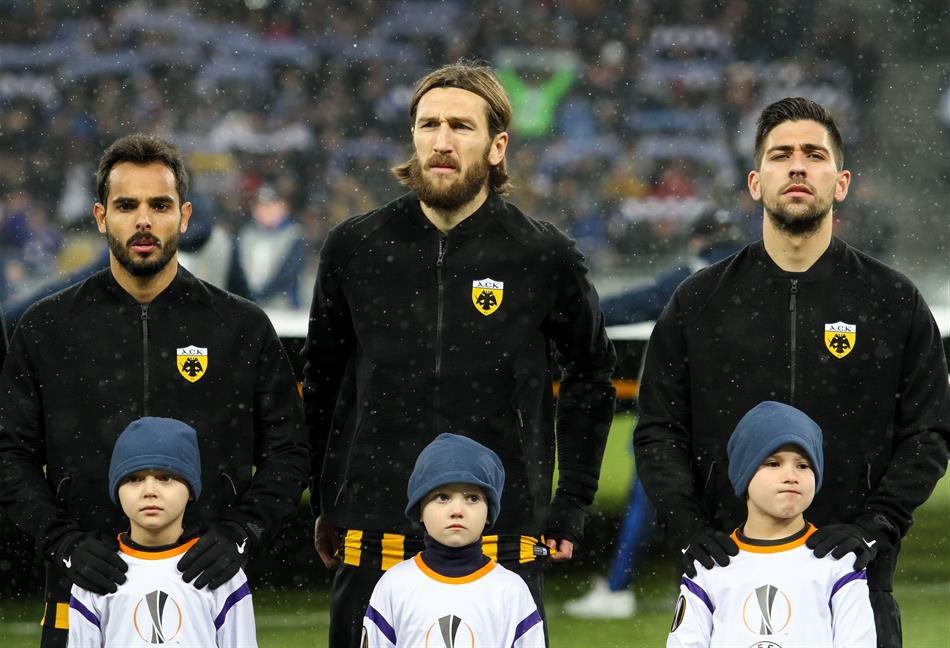
Chygrynskyi, Bakasetas and Galo in Kyiv.

In the Europa League group stage, AEK were placed in Group D with Milan, Rijeka and Austria Wien. The team, with 1 win and 5 draws, managed to finish in second place with and advance to the round of 32 of the competition after ten years, scoring 8 games undefeated in European competitions. There, they faced the Ukrainian Dynamo Kyiv. In the first game in Athens, AEK entered strongly, but they conceded a goal in the only chance of Dynamo in the match and then the Ukrainians were closed in their area with the yellow-blacks pressing relentlessly equalizing at the end of the match. With no easy task, AEK traveled to NSC Olimpiyskiy, where they pressed Dynamo, who were playing to keep the qualification score. The yellow-blacks missed big chances and in the end the goal never came, with AEK being eliminated without defeat and completing a 10-match unbeaten streak in European competitions.

In the winter, AEK, in order to replace the injured Mantalos and Johansson, proceeded with the transfers of the international Iranian midfielder Masoud Shojaei and the Spanish Erik Morán, while Traustason, Patito Rodríguez and Vinícius departed, with the latter being replaced by Niklas Hult from Panathinaikos. Despite the small roster, the team continued in the same manner in a very competitive league, until the following events occurred. Their contenders for the league, PAOK and Olympiacos faced each other in Thessaloniki and before the start of the game, the coach of the red and whites, Óscar García was hit with a paper roll in the face, resulting in the departure of the squad of Olympiacos and their 0–3 victory on paper. This resulted in PAOK being punished with a 3-point deduction and a one-game home ban, which coincided against AEK. PAOK filed an appeal and after the midnight before the crucial match, the decision came out returning the points, as well as lifting their home ban, with the team of Thessaloniki "magically" managing in a few hours to print and sell all the tickets for the match. So, under these cirmconstances, AEK went to the Toumba Stadium to compete and in a game, where despite the hostile referee, they managed to limit their opponent and everything was going smoothly, until the 90th minute, when at the only big chance of PAOK in the match, Fernando Varela scored with his teammate, Maurício got in the course of the ball with a projection in the air, from an obvious offside position. The referee Kominis initially counted the goal, but after protests from the players of AEK to the assistant, Pontikis and after consultation between the referees, they decided to cancel the goal. This resulted in the major shareholder of PAOK, Ivan Savvidis storming in the pitch with bodyguards to take the team and leave. When the captain of the black and whites, Vieirinha signaled him not to do this, he attacked Kominis. A moment later, he took off his jacket and a revolver was revealed in his belt. Then Kominis decided to stop the match and sent the teams to the locker rooms. After consultation, Kominis returned to the pitch with the players of PAOK to continue the match with the score at 1–0, but the yellow-blacks in the image of the gun refused to come out. The match was abandoned with the score 1–0 in favor of PAOK and the case was transferred to courts, where AEK was vindicated and were awarded the match with 0–3 and with the Thessaloniki team being punished with a 3-point deduction from this year's championship, 3 from the next season's championship, a 3-game home ban and the punishment of Ivan Savvidis and Ľuboš Micheľ. With this decision, AEK's task of claiming the championship became easier and eventually came true in the home match against Levadiakos, where they managed to mathematically secure the title winning by 2–0, in celebratory atmosphere in the packed Olympic Stadium. After winning the last game at Rizoupoli Stadium against Apollon Smyrnis, AEK were crowned champions and held a title party in Nea Filadelfeia with their fans, in front of their under construction stadium.

In the cup, AEK emphatically finished at the top of their group with only wins and eliminated Panetolikos just as easily for the round of 16. In the quarter-finals they faced Olympiacos and after a heroic 0–0 draw at Karaiskakis Stadium, prevailed 2–1 at the Olympic Stadium, eliminating them for the second time in a row. Also noteworthy was that AEK had 3 wins, 1 draw and no defeats in 4 matches against the red and whites during the season. In the semi-finals they faced AEL and in the first game the team appeared tired from the back-to-back games, suffering their first defeat in the institution. In the return match the team from Larissa were closed in their area, playing to keep the qualifying score with the yellow-blacks pressing relentlessly throughout the game. In the seventh and final minute of the stoppage time, a goal with a stunning bicycle kick from a difficult angle by Lazaros Christodoulopoulos gave AEK the qualification to the final for the third consecutive year, with the visitors conceding the superiority of the yellow-blacks. For the second year in a row, AEK faced PAOK, who were boiling in anger at losing the championship. This time at the Olympic Stadium on 12 May, AEK appeared tired from their effort throughout the season and lost by 2–0 hands down to title-hungry PAOK.

== Management team ==
Position	Staff
Manager	(Spain) Manolo Jiménez
Assistant manager	(Spain) Felipe Benitez Ufano
Goalkeeping coach	(Greece) Chrysostomos Michailidis
Fitness coach	(Spain) Sebastián López Bascón
Fitness coach	(Greece) Giannis Kesoglou
Academy director	(Greece) Akis Zikos
U20 Manager	(Greece) Giorgos Simos
U17 Manager	(Serbia) Ivan Nedeljković
Executive director	(Bosnia and Herzegovina) Dušan Bajević
Technical director	(Greece) Nikos Liberopoulos
Head of Scouting	(Greece) Michalis Kasapis
Scout	(Greece) Dimitrios Barbalias
Scout	(Greece) Andreas Lagonikakis
Head of Medical	(Greece) Lakis Nikolaou

- Source: aekfc.gr

== Players ==
=== Squad information ===
NOTE: The players are the ones that have been announced by the AEK Athens' press release. No edits should be made unless a player arrival or exit is announced. Updated 12 May 2018, 23:59 UTC+3.

No.	Player	Nat.	Position(s)	Date of birth (Age)	Signed	Previous club	Transfer fee	Contract until
Goalkeepers
1	Vasilis Barkas	(Greece) (Netherlands)	GK	30 May 1994 (aged 24)	2016	(Greece) Atromitos	€600,000	2019
16	Panagiotis Tsintotas	(Greece)	GK	4 July 1993 (aged 24)	2017	(Greece) Levadiakos	Free	2020
22	Giannis Anestis	(Greece)	GK	9 March 1991 (aged 27)	2014	(Greece) Panionios	Free	2018
87	Panagiotis Dounis	(Greece)	GK	29 March 1997 (aged 21)	2013	(Greece) AEK Athens U20	—	2019
98	Thanasis Pantos	(Greece)	GK	9 October 1998 (aged 19)	2017	(Greece) AEK Athens U20	—	2020
Defenders
2	Michalis Bakakis	(Greece)	RB / LB / CB / RM	18 March 1991 (aged 27)	2014	(Greece) Panetolikos	€250,000	2019
3	Hélder Lopes	(Portugal)	LB / LM / LW	4 January 1989 (aged 29)	2017	(Spain) Las Palmas	Free	2019
4	Ognjen Vranješ	(Bosnia and Herzegovina) (Serbia)	CB / RB	24 October 1989 (aged 28)	2016	(Russia) Tom Tomsk	Free	2019
5	Vasilios Lampropoulos	(Greece)	CB / RB	31 March 1990 (aged 28)	2016	(Greece) Panionios	Free	2019
12	Rodrigo Galo	(Brazil)	RB / RM / RW / LB	19 September 1986 (aged 31)	2015	(Portugal) Paços de Ferreira	Free	2019
15	Uroš Ćosić	(Serbia)	CB / RB / LB / DM	24 October 1992 (aged 25)	2017	(Italy) Empoli	€500,000	2020
19	Dmytro Chyhrynskyi	(Ukraine)	CB	7 November 1986 (aged 31)	2016	(Ukraine) Dnipro Dnipropetrovsk	Free	2020
23	Niklas Hult	(Sweden)	LB / LM	13 February 1990 (aged 28)	2018	(Greece) Panathinaikos	€200,000	2020
33	Georgios Giannoutsos	(Greece)	LB / CB / DM	16 July 1998 (aged 19)	2016	(Greece) AEK Athens U20	—	2020
55	Adam Tzanetopoulos	(Greece)	CB / DM / CM	10 February 1995 (aged 23)	2013	(Greece) Niki Volos	Free	2020
Midfielders
6	Astrit Ajdarević	(Albania) (Sweden)	CM / AM / DM / ST	17 April 1990 (aged 28)	2016	(Sweden) Örebro	Free	2019
8	André Simões (Vice-captain 2)	(Portugal)	DM / CM	16 December 1989 (aged 28)	2015	(Portugal) Moreirense	Free	2019
18	Jakob Johansson (Vice-captain)	(Sweden)	DM / CM / CB	21 January 1990 (aged 28)	2014	(Sweden) Göteborg	Free	2018
20	Petros Mantalos (Captain)	(Greece)	AM / LM / CM / LW / SS / RM / RW	31 August 1991 (aged 26)	2014	(Greece) Xanthi	€500,000	2022
21	Panagiotis Kone	(Greece) (Albania)	AM / RM / LM / RW / LW / CM	26 July 1987 (aged 30)	2017	(Italy) Udinese	Free	2018
23	Masoud Shojaei	(Iran)	AM / LW / RW / SS / LM / RM	9 June 1984 (aged 34)	2017	(Greece) Panionios	Free	2018
25	Konstantinos Galanopoulos	(Greece)	CM / DM	28 December 1997 (aged 20)	2015	(Greece) AEK Athens U20	—	2021
32	Paris Babis	(Greece)	DM / CM	17 July 1999 (aged 18)	2017	(Greece) AEK Athens U20	—	2022
39	Erik Morán	(Spain)	DM / CM	25 May 1991 (aged 27)	2018	(Spain) Leganés	€130,000	2021
Forwards
7	Lazaros Christodoulopoulos	(Greece)	RW / LW / RM / LM / SS / AM / CM	19 December 1986 (aged 31)	2016	(Italy) Hellas Verona	Free	2018
9	Giorgos Giakoumakis	(Greece)	ST / SS	9 December 1994 (aged 23)	2017	(Greece) Platanias	€300,000	2021
10	Marko Livaja	(Croatia)	SS / ST / AM / LW / RW / LM / RM	26 August 1993 (aged 24)	2017	(Spain) Las Palmas	€200,000	2018
11	Sergio Araujo	(Argentina)	ST / SS / LW / RW	28 January 1992 (aged 26)	2017	(Spain) Las Palmas	€800,000	2018
14	Anastasios Bakasetas	(Greece)	SS / AM / ST / RW / LW / RM / LM	28 June 1993 (aged 25)	2016	(Greece) Panionios	€300,000	2019
28	Victor Klonaridis	(Belgium) (Greece)	SS / LW / RW / LM / RM / ST / AM / CM	28 July 1992 (aged 25)	2017	(France) Lens	€200,000	2020
31	Dimitrios Melikiotis	(Greece)	ST / SS / RW / LW	10 July 1996 (aged 21)	2017	(Greece) Veria	Free	2021
70	Christos Antoniou	(Greece)	RW / RM	14 February 1998 (aged 20)	2017	(Greece) AEK Athens U20	—	2022
77	Christos Giousis	(Greece) (Albania)	RW / LW / RM / LM / SS / AM	8 October 1999 (aged 18)	2017	(Greece) AEK Athens U20	—	2022
Left during Summer Transfer Window
—	Hugo Almeida	(Portugal)	ST	23 May 1984 (aged 34)	2016	(Germany) Hannover 96	Free	2018
Left during Winter Transfer Window
17	Vinícius Freitas	(Brazil) (Portugal)	LB / LM / LW	7 March 1993 (aged 25)	2017	(Italy) Lazio	Free	2019
30	Arnór Ingvi Traustason	(Iceland)	LM / LW / RM / RW / SS / AM	30 April 1993 (aged 25)	2017	(Austria) Rapid Wien	Free	2018
29	Patito Rodríguez	(Argentina)	LW / LM / RW / RM / SS / AM	4 May 1990 (aged 28)	2016	(Brazil) Santos	Free	2018
40	Andreas Vlachomitros	(Greece)	SS / ST / RW / LW	3 July 1997 (aged 20)	2015	(Greece) AEK Athens U20	—	2019

== Transfers ==
=== In ===
==== Summer ====
No.	Pos.	Player	From	Fee	Date	Contract Until	Source
3	DF	(Portugal) Hélder Lopes	(Spain) Las Palmas	Free transfer	1 July 2017	30 June 2019	
11	FW	(Greece) Giorgos Giakoumakis	(Greece) Platanias	€300,000	1 July 2017	30 June 2021	
15	DF	(Serbia) Uroš Ćosić	(Italy) Empoli	€500,000	3 July 2017	30 June 2020	
16	GK	(Greece) Panagiotis Tsintotas	(Greece) Levadiakos	Free transfer	1 July 2017	30 June 2020	
28	FW	(Belgium) Victor Klonaridis	(France) Lens	€200,000	1 July 2017	30 June 2020	
32	MF	(Greece) Paris Babis	(Greece) AEK Athens U20	Promotion	1 July 2017	30 June 2022	
55	DF	(Greece) Adam Tzanetopoulos	(Greece) Iraklis	Loan return	1 July 2017	30 June 2020	
70	FW	(Greece) Christos Antoniou	(Greece) AEK Athens U20	Promotion	1 July 2017	30 June 2022	
77	FW	(Greece) Christos Giousis	(Greece) AEK Athens U20	Promotion	1 July 2017	30 June 2022	
87	GK	(Greece) Panagiotis Dounis	(Greece) Kallithea	Loan return	1 July 2017	30 June 2019	
98	GK	(Greece) Thanasis Pantos	(Greece) AEK Athens U20	Promotion	21 August 2017	30 June 2020	
—	DF	(Greece) Stavros Vasilantonopoulos	(Greece) Veria	Loan return	1 July 2017	30 June 2018	
—	FW	(Greece) Antonis Kyriazis	(Greece) A.E. Kifisia	Loan return	1 July 2017	30 June 2017	

==== Winter ====
No.	Pos.	Player	From	Fee	Date	Contract Until	Source
23	DF	(Sweden) Niklas Hult	(Greece) Panathinaikos	€200,000	31 January 2018	30 June 2020	
24	MF	(Iran) Masoud Shojaei	(Greece) Panionios	Free transfer	28 December 2017	30 June 2018	
31	FW	(Greece) Dimitrios Melikiotis	(Greece) Kerkyra	Loan termination	30 January 2018	30 June 2021	
39	MF	(Spain) Erik Morán	(Spain) Leganés	€130,000	2 January 2018	30 June 2021	
98	GK	(Greece) Thanasis Pantos	(Greece) Acharnaikos	Loan termination	3 January 2018	30 June 2020	
—	MF	(Greece) Ilias Tselios	(Greece) Lamia	Loan return	28 December 2017	30 June 2020	

=== Out ===
==== Summer ====
No.	Pos.	Player	To	Fee	Date	Source
9	FW	(Portugal) Hugo Almeida	(Croatia) Hajduk Split	Contract termination	30 August 2017	
10	MF	(Venezuela) Ronald Vargas	(Australia) Newcastle Jets	End of contract	16 September 2017	
11	FW	(Argentina) Sergio Araujo	(Spain) Las Palmas	Loan return	30 June 2017	
14	FW	(Czech Republic) Tomáš Pekhart	(Israel) Hapoel Be'er Sheva	End of contract	21 July 2017	
16	GK	(Greece) Ilias Vouras	(Greece) Doxa Drama	End of contract	7 August 2017	
21	FW	(Greece) Christos Aravidis	Free agent	End of contract	1 July 2017	
23	DF	(Spain) Dídac Vilà	(Spain) Espanyol	Contract termination^{[a]}	29 August 2017	
24	DF	(Greece) Konstantinos Manolas	(Greece) Levadiakos	Contract termination	29 August 2017	
26	DF	(Greece) Dimitrios Kolovetsios	(Greece) Panathinaikos	End of contract	3 July 2017	
—	FW	(Greece) Antonis Kyriazis	(Cyprus) Aris Limassol	End of contract	1 September 2017	

==== Winter ====
No.	Pos.	Player	To	Fee	Date	Source
17	DF	(Brazil) Vinícius	(Brazil) Chapecoense	Contract termination	18 January 2018	
29	FW	(Argentina) Patito Rodríguez	(Australia) Newcastle Jets	Contract termination	8 December 2017	
30	MF	(Iceland) Arnór Ingvi Traustason	(Austria) Rapid Wien	Loan termination	6 December 2017	

=== Loan in ===
==== Summer ====
No.	Pos.	Player	From	Fee	Date	Until	Option to buy	Source
10	FW	(Croatia) Marko Livaja	(Spain) Las Palmas	€200,000	1 July 2017	30 June 2018	✓	
11	FW	(Argentina) Sergio Araujo	(Spain) Las Palmas	€800,000	31 August 2017	30 June 2018	✗	
21	MF	(Greece) Panagiotis Kone	(Italy) Udinese	Free	31 August 2017	30 June 2018	✓	
30	MF	(Iceland) Arnór Ingvi Traustason	(Austria) Rapid Wien	Free	5 July 2017	30 June 2018	✓	

=== Loan out ===
==== Summer ====
No.	Pos.	Player	To	Fee	Date	Until	Option to buy	Source
31	FW	(Greece) Dimitrios Melikiotis	(Greece) Kerkyra	Free	16 August 2017	30 June 2018	✗	
87	GK	(Greece) Giannis Papadopoulos	(Greece) Kissamikos	Free	9 August 2017	30 June 2018	✗	
98	GK	(Greece) Thanasis Pantos	(Greece) Acharnaikos	Free	2 September 2017	30 June 2018	✗	
—	DF	(Greece) Alkis Markopouliotis	(Greece) Kissamikos	Free	9 August 2017	30 June 2018	✗	
—	DF	(Greece) Stavros Vasilantonopoulos	(Greece) Lamia	Free	26 June 2017	30 June 2018	✗	
—	MF	(Greece) Ilias Tselios	(Greece) Lamia	Free	5 July 2017	31 December 2017	✗	

==== Winter ====
No.	Pos.	Player	To	Fee	Date	Until	Option to buy	Source
—	MF	(Greece) Ilias Tselios	(Greece) Ergotelis	Free	10 January 2018	30 June 2018	✗	
—	MF	(Greece) Andreas Vlachomitros	(Greece) Apollon Pontus	Free	25 January 2018	30 June 2018	✗	

Notes

a. The player paid €250,000 to AEK Athens for the termination of his contract.

=== Contract renewals ===
No.	Pos.	Player	Date	Former Exp. Date	New Exp. Date	Source
19	DF	(Ukraine) Dmytro Chyhrynskyi	30 March 2018	30 June 2018	30 June 2020	
20	MF	(Greece) Petros Mantalos	16 November 2017	30 June 2019	30 June 2022	
—	DF	(Greece) Stavros Vasilantonopoulos	30 May 2018	30 June 2018	30 June 2020	

=== Overall transfer activity ===
==== Expenditure ====
Summer: ▼€2,000,000

Winter: ▼€330,000

Total: ▼€2,330,000

==== Income ====
Summer: ▲€0

Winter: ▲€0

Total: ▲€0

==== Net Totals ====
Summer: ▼€2,000,000

Winter: ▼€330,000

Total: ▼€2,330,000

== Pre-season and friendlies ==
8 July 2017 Friendly	AEK Athens	1–1	Karpaty Lviv	Częstochowa
18:00 EEST (UTC+3)	Giakoumakis 18'	Report	Chacua 10'	Stadium: Stadion Piłkarski

9 July 2017 Friendly	Korona Kielce	0–1	AEK Athens	Kielce
19:00 EEST (UTC+3)	Rymaniak (yellow card) 4'; Żubrowski (yellow card) 32'	Report	Chyhrynskyi (yellow card) 21'; Klonaridis 27'; Babis (yellow card) 72'; Vlachomitros (yellow card) 88'	Stadium: Arena Kielce; Referee: Damian Gavetski (Poland)

14 July 2017 Friendly	AEK Athens	3–1	Banik Ostrava	Częstochowa
18:00 EEST (UTC+3)	Lopes 17'; Livaja (penalty missed) 38; Mantalos 41'; Almeida 80' (pen.)	Report	Sasinka 15', (yellow card) 33'; Šindelář (yellow card) 79'	Stadium: Stadion Piłkarski

15 July 2017 Friendly	AEK Athens	2–0	Bnei Sakhnin	Częstochowa
19:00 EEST (UTC+3)	Christodoulopoulos 4'; Galanopoulos 14'	Report	Ottman (yellow card) 37'; Gaúcho (yellow card) 51'	Stadium: Stadion Piłkarski

19 July 2017 Friendly	AEK Athens	1–1	Gent	Marousi
20:30 EEST (UTC+3)	Chyhrynskyi (yellow card) 47'; Mantalos 73'	Report	Andrijašević 37'; Marcq (yellow card) 53'	Stadium: Olympic Stadium; Referee: Aristidis Vatsios (West Attica)

10 August 2017 Friendly	AEK Athens	2–1	Platanias	Marousi
20:00 EEST (UTC+3)	Christodoulopoulos 18' (pen.); Simões 49'	Report	Mantalos 9' (o.g.)	Stadium: Olympic Stadium; Attendance: Behind closed doors Referee: Anastasios Papapetrou (Athens)

31 August 2017 Friendly	AEK Athens	3–1	Kallithea	Spata
19:30 EEST (UTC+3)	Vlachomitros; Bakakis; Christodoulopoulos	Report	Candé	Stadium: Spata Training Centre; Attendance: Behind closed doors

5 October 2017 Friendly	Panachaiki	2–3	AEK Athens	Patras
19:00 EEST (UTC+3)	Eleftheriadis 29'; Sotirakos (yellow card) 67'; Kynigopoulos 81'	Report	Galo 59'; Klonaridis 76', 85'	Stadium: Kostas Davourlis Stadium; Referee: Nikos Makripodis (Achaia)

9 November 2017 Friendly	AEK Athens	0–1	Čukarički	Spata
18:30 EET (UTC+2)		Report	Owusu 44'	Stadium: Spata Training Centre; Attendance: Behind closed doors Referee: Andreas Gamaris (Athens)

16 March 2018 Friendly	AEK Athens	5–0	Lamia	Marousi
18:00 EET (UTC+2)	Ajdarević 2'; Giakoumakis 29', 44'; Christodoulopoulos 89'; Melikiotis 90+1'	Report	Andronic (yellow card) 75'	Stadium: Olympic Stadium; Attendance: Behind closed doors Referee: Nikos Ratsiatos (Argolida)

21 March 2018 Friendly	AEK Athens	4–0	Panetolikos	Marousi
17:00 EET (UTC+2)	Ajdarević 12'; Klonaridis 16', 74'; Morán (yellow card) 39'; Giakoumakis 62'	Report		Stadium: Olympic Stadium; Attendance: Behind closed doors Referee: Alexandros Tsamouris (Piraeus)

== Competitions ==
=== Overall record ===
Competition	First match	Last match	Starting round	Final position	Record							
Competition	First match	Last match	Starting round	Final position	Pld	W	D	L	GF	GA	GD	Win %
Super League	20 August 2017	5 May 2018	Matchday 1	Winners	30	21	7	2	50	12	+38	70.00
Greek Cup	20 September 2017	12 May 2018	Group Stage	Runners-up	10	7	1	2	21	7	+14	70.00
UEFA Champions League	25 July 2017	2 August 2017	Third qualifying round	Third qualifying round	2	0	0	2	0	3	−3	0.00
UEFA Europa League	17 August 2017	24 August 2017	Play-off round	Round of 32	10	2	8	0	10	6	+4	20.00
Total					52	30	16	6	81	28	+53	57.69

Last updated: 12 May 2018
Source: Competitions

=== Super League Greece ===
==== League table ====
Pos	Team	Pld	W	D	L	GF	GA	GD	Pts	Qualification or relegation
1	AEK Athens (C)	30	21	7	2	50	12	+38	70	Qualification for the Champions League third qualifying round
2	PAOK	30	21	4	5	59	19	+40	64 (Note: PAOK were deducted 3 points by court decision.)	Qualification for the Champions League second qualifying round
3	Olympiacos	30	18	6	6	63	28	+35	57 (Note: Olympiacos were deducted 3 points due to crowd behavior against AEK on 4 February 2018.)	Qualification for the Europa League third qualifying round
4	Atromitos	30	15	11	4	43	21	+22	56	Qualification for the Europa League second qualifying round
5	Asteras Tripolis	30	12	9	9	39	24	+15	45 (Note: Head-to-head points: Asteras Tripolis 2, Xanthi 2.)	Qualification for the Europa League second qualifying round

Source: Super League Greece
Rules for classification: 1) Points; 2) Head-to-head points; 3) Head-to-head goal difference; 4) Goals scored; 5) Goals against; 6) Play-offs (neutral ground); 7) Draw.
(Note: Criteria 6 is only used if needed to decide champion, teams for relegation or teams for UEFA competitions).
(C) Champions

==== Results summary ====
Overall								Home						Away					
Pld	W	D	L	GF	GA	GD	Pts	W	D	L	GF	GA	GD	W	D	L	GF	GA	GD
30	21	7	2	50	12	+38	70	13	1	1	32	5	+27	8	6	1	18	7	+11

Last updated: 2018-05-12.
Source: Super League Greece

==== Results by Matchday ====
Round	1	2	3	4	5	6	7	8	9	10	11	12	13	14	15	16	17	18	19	20	21	22	23	24	25	26	27	28	29	30
Ground	H	A	H	A	H	A	A	H	A	H	A	H	A	H	H	A	H	A	H	A	H	H	A	H	A	H	A	H	A	A
Result	W	D	W	W	W	L	D	L	W	W	D	W	W	W	D	W	W	D	W	W	W	W	D	W	W	W	W	W	D	W
Position	2	3	1	1	1	1	2	3	3	2	1	1	1	1	2	2	2	3	3	2	2	2	2	1	1	1	1	1	1	1

Updated to match(es) played on 12 May 2018. Source: slgr.gr
A = Away; H = Home; W = Win; D = Draw; L = Loss; P = Postponed

==== Matches ====
20 August 2017 1	AEK Athens	2−0	Panetolikos	Marousi
19:15 EEST (UTC+3)	Almeida 14' (pen.), (red card) 28'; Johansson (yellow card) 41', (goal) 73'; Mantalos (yellow card) 45+1'	Report	Paulo (yellow card) 13' (yellow-red card) 48'; Díaz (yellow card) 33'; M. Rodrigues (yellow card) 40'; Chantakias (yellow card) 51'; Bejarano (yellow card) 56'	Stadium: Olympic Stadium; Attendance: Behind closed doors Referee: Athanasios Tzilos (Larissa); Man of the Match: Giannis Anestis

27 August 2017 2	PAS Giannina	0−0	AEK Athens	Ioannina
21:30 EEST (UTC+3)	Boukouvalas (yellow card) 51'; Vidal (yellow card) 79'; Lila (yellow card) 83'	Report	Vranješ (yellow card) 49'; Ćosić (yellow card) 56'; Mantalos (yellow card) 80'	Stadium: Zosimades Stadium; Attendance: 4,052; Referee: Alexandros Aretopoulos (Trikala); Man of the Match: Bruno Challkiadakis

10 September 2017 3	AEK Athens	4−0	AEL	Marousi
18:15 EEST (UTC+3)	Mantalos 4'; Klonaridis 34'; Vranješ (yellow card) 53'; Bakasetas 74'; Araujo 86'	Report	Fatjon (yellow card) 16'; Rentzas (yellow card) 33'; Aganović (red card) 49'	Stadium: Olympic Stadium; Attendance: Behind closed doors Referee: Evangelos Evangelou (Athens); Man of the Match: Petros Mantalos

17 September 2017 4	Lamia	0−1	AEK Athens	Peristeri
20:30 EEST (UTC+3)	Piti (yellow card) 54'; Koukolis (yellow card) 60'; Acosta (yellow card) 80'; Asigba (yellow card) 85'	Report	Vranješ (yellow card) 24'; Johansson (yellow card) 54'; Ćosić (yellow card) 74'; Christodoulopoulos 81' (pen.); Ajdarević (yellow card) 90+1'	Stadium: Peristeri Stadium; Attendance: 3,677; Referee: Aristidis Vatsios (West Attica); Man of the Match: Lazaros Christodoulopoulos
Note: Change of venue due to unavailability of the Lamia Municipal Stadium.

24 September 2017 5	AEK Athens	3−2	Olympiacos	Marousi
20:30 EEST (UTC+3)	Araujo (yellow card) 24'; Mantalos (yellow card) 50', (goal) 89'; Christodoulopoulos 64', 80'; Livaja (yellow card) 90+2'; Ćosić (red card) 90+4'	Report	Odjidja-Ofoe (yellow card) 8', (goal) 46'; Marin 22', (yellow card) 45+1'; Romao (yellow card) 50'; Gillet (yellow card) 79'; Engels (red card) 90+4'; Tachtsidis (yellow card) 90+5'	Stadium: Olympic Stadium; Attendance: 25,156; Referee: Anastasios Sidiropoulos (Dodecanese); Man of the Match: Lazaros Christodoulopoulos

1 October 2017 6	Asteras Tripolis	2−0	AEK Athens	Tripoli
20:30 EEST (UTC+3)	Isnaldo (yellow card) 22'; Munafo (yellow card) 38', (goal) 47'; Manias 81'; Tsilianidis (yellow card) 88'; Giannoulis (yellow card) 90'	Report	Vranješ (yellow card) 33'; Bakasetas (yellow card) 57'; Giannoutsos (yellow card) 63'; Johansson (yellow card) 73'	Stadium: Theodoros Kolokotronis Stadium; Attendance: 3,344; Referee: Anastasios Papapetrou (Athens); Man of the Match: Anastasios Douvikas

15 October 2017 7	Xanthi	1−1	AEK Athens	Xanthi
20:30 EEST (UTC+3)	Fliskas (yellow card) 6' (yellow-red card) 55'; Lisgaras (yellow card) 20'; Brito (yellow card) 40', (goal) 40'; Svarnas (red card) 72'; Sylla (yellow card) 84'; Casado (yellow card) 90+5'	Report	Bakakis (yellow card) 14'; Galanopoulos (yellow card) 39'; Livaja (yellow card) 45+2'; Simões (yellow card) 62'; Vranješ 88'; Araujo (yellow card) 90'	Stadium: Xanthi FC Arena; Attendance: 3,483; Referee: Ioannis Papadopoulos (Macedonia); Man of the Match: Živko Živković

23 October 2017 8	AEK Athens	0−1	Atromitos	Marousi
19:30 EEST (UTC+3)	Livaja (yellow card) 41'; Bakakis (yellow card) 45+1'; Lampropoulos (yellow card) 55'; Ćosić (yellow card) 90'	Report	Bušuladžić (yellow card) 24'; Kivrakidis (yellow card) 29'; Dauda (yellow card) 45', (goal) 55'; Diguiny (yellow card) 90'	Stadium: Olympic Stadium; Attendance: Behind closed doors Referee: Aristotelis Diamantopoulos (Arcadia); Man of the Match: Amr Warda

29 October 2017 9	Panionios	0−1	AEK Athens	Nea Smyrni
19:30 EET (UTC+2)	Durmishaj (yellow card) 43'; Ikonomou (yellow card) 49'; Hajsafi (yellow card) 57'; Kargas (yellow card) 68'; Banana (yellow card) 90'	Report	Araujo (yellow card) 42', (goal) 81'; Vranješ (yellow card) 43'; Galanopoulos (yellow card) 62'; Mantalos (yellow card) 67'; Simões (yellow card) 75'	Stadium: Nea Smyrni Stadium; Attendance: 2,907; Referee: Stavros Mantalos (Kavala); Man of the Match: Sergio Araujo

5 November 2017 10	AEK Athens	1–0	PAOK	Marousi
19:30 EET (UTC+2)	Araujo (red card) 8'; Christodoulopoulos (yellow card) 23'; Livaja 25'; Lopes (yellow card) 67'; Galanopoulos (yellow card) 80'; Anestis (yellow card) 89'	Report	Zambrano (yellow card) 8' (yellow-red card) 35'; Prijović (yellow card) 28'; Shakhov (yellow card) 45+3'; El Kaddouri (yellow card) 50'; Cimirot (yellow card) 61'; Vieirinha (yellow card) 63'; Biseswar (yellow card) 90+1' (red card) 90+1'	Stadium: Olympic Stadium; Attendance: 14,056; Referee: Alexandros Aretopoulos (Trikala); Man of the Match: Marko Livaja

19 November 2017 11	Panathinaikos	1−1	AEK Athens	Ampelokipoi
19:30 EET (UTC+2)	Moledo 10'; Hiljemark (yellow card) 43'; Villafáñez (yellow card) 84'; Vlachodimos (yellow card) 90+1'; Reis (yellow card) 90+4'	Report	Livaja (yellow card) 60', (goal) 90+5'; Bakakis (yellow card) 68'; Simões (yellow card) 77'; Lopes (yellow card) 84'	Stadium: Leoforos Alexandras Stadium; Attendance: 8,734; Referee: Charalampos Kalogeropoulos (Athens); Man of the Match: Marko Livaja

27 November 2017 12	AEK Athens	3−0	Platanias	Marousi
19:30 EET (UTC+2)	Livaja 39', 49'; Bakasetas 63'	Report	Patralis (yellow card) 13'; Oues (yellow card) 25'	Stadium: Olympic Stadium; Attendance: 20,586; Referee: Georgios Tzovaras (Phthiotis); Man of the Match: Marko Livaja

3 December 2017 13	Levadiakos	0–2	AEK Athens	Livadeia
19:30 EET (UTC+2)	Mendy (yellow card) 36'; Zaradoukas (yellow card) 48'; Mitropoulos (yellow card) 64'; Tripotseris (yellow card) 90+1'	Report	Livaja 52'; Araujo 66'; Galanopoulos (yellow card) 72'; Bakasetas (yellow card) 90+2'	Stadium: Levadia Municipal Stadium; Attendance: 1,470; Referee: Georgios Kominis (Thesprotia); Man of the Match: Marko Livaja

11 December 2017 14	AEK Athens	3−1	Kerkyra	Marousi
19:30 EET (UTC+2)	Giannakopoulos 12' (o.g.); Kone 38', (yellow card) 87'; Araujo 56'	Report	Gomes (yellow card) 10'; Balafas (yellow card) 68'; Artymatas (yellow card) 75'; Nunes 88' (pen.)	Stadium: Olympic Stadium; Attendance: 5,011; Referee: Athanasios Sezos (Kilkis); Man of the Match: Panagiotis Kone

16 December 2017 15	AEK Athens	0−0	Apollon Smyrnis	Marousi
17:15 EET (UTC+2)	Araujo (yellow card) 87'	Report	Kontoes (yellow card) 24'; Papazoglou (yellow card) 31'; Juárez (yellow card) 36'; Añete (yellow card) 54'; Čović (yellow card) 90+5'	Stadium: Olympic Stadium; Attendance: 6,324; Referee: Stefanos Koubarakis (Thrace); Man of the Match: Marko Livaja

6 January 2018 16	Panetolikos	1−4	AEK Athens	Agrinio
19:30 EET (UTC+2)	Bejarano (yellow card) 37'; Morar 68' (pen.); Mihaj (yellow card) 82'	Report	Bakasetas 6'; Christodoulopoulos 36' (pen.); Chyhrynskyi (yellow card) 43'; Araujo 45+1'; Lopes 60'; Kone (yellow card) 67'	Stadium: Panetolikos Stadium; Attendance: 3,744; Referee: Dimitrios Karantonis (Imathia); Man of the Match: Anastasios Bakasetas

14 January 2018 17	AEK Athens	3−1	PAS Giannina	Marousi
19:30 EET (UTC+2)	Livaja 12'; Araujo 53', 89'	Report	Boukouvalas (yellow card) 29'; Skondras (yellow card) 39' (yellow-red card) 61'; Garoufalias 47'	Stadium: Olympic Stadium; Attendance: 6,014; Referee: Dimitris Styliaras (Aetoloacarnania); Man of the Match: Marko Livaja

20 January 2018 18	AEL	0−0	AEK Athens	Larissa
19:30 EET (UTC+2)	Lagos (yellow card) 32'; Golias (yellow card) 41'; Andoni (yellow card) 55'; Rentzas (yellow card) 57'; Masouras (yellow card) 82'; Hubchev (yellow card) 90+1'; Božović (yellow card) 90+3'	Report	Araujo (yellow card) 14'; Christodoulopoulos (yellow card) 30'; Livaja (yellow card) 73'	Stadium: AEL FC Arena; Attendance: 5,519; Referee: Emmanouil Skoulas (Thessaly); Man of the Match: Radomir Milosavljević

27 January 2018 19	AEK Athens	2–0	Lamia	Marousi
19:30 EET (UTC+2)	Christodoulopoulos 40'; Vranješ (yellow card) 52'; Livaja 63'	Report	Omo (yellow card) 39'; Anastasopoulos (yellow card) 53'; Koukolis (yellow card) 88'	Stadium: Olympic Stadium; Attendance: 4,102; Referee: Aristomenis Koutsiaftis (Arta); Man of the Match: Anastasios Bakasetas

4 February 2018 20	Olympiacos	1–2	AEK Athens	Piraeus
19:30 EET (UTC+2)	Botía (yellow card) 30' (yellow-red card) 90+4'; Romao (yellow card) 37'; Ansarifard 81', (yellow card) 83'	Report	Simões (yellow card) 28'; Masoud (yellow card) 74'; Bakakis (yellow card) 76'; Chyhrynskyi 87'; Livaja (yellow card) 90+3'; Giakoumakis 90+4'	Stadium: Karaiskakis Stadium; Attendance: 31,231; Referee: Anastasios Papapetrou (Athens); Man of the Match: Giorgos Giakoumakis

11 February 2018 21	AEK Athens	1–0	Asteras Tripolis	Marousi
17:15 EET (UTC+2)	Christodoulopoulos 61' (pen.); Morán (yellow card) 82'; Araujo (yellow card) 89'	Report	Iglesias (yellow card) 41'; Tonso (yellow card) 42'; Kyriakopoulos (yellow card) 48'; Pasalidis (yellow card) 70'	Stadium: Olympic Stadium; Attendance: 8,315; Referee: Evangelos Evangelou (Athens); Man of the Match: Niklas Hult

18 February 2018 22	AEK Athens	4–0	Xanthi	Marousi
17:15 EET (UTC+2)	Vranješ 5', 19', 33'; Bakasetas 44'	Report	Jendrišek (yellow card) 43'; Brito (yellow card) 61'	Stadium: Olympic Stadium; Attendance: 7,562; Referee: Aristotelis Diamantopoulos (Arcadia); Man of the Match: Ognjen Vranješ

26 February 2018 23	Atromitos	1–1	AEK Athens	Peristeri
19:30 EET (UTC+2)	Warda 80'; Giannoulis (yellow card) 85'	Report	Galo (yellow card) 54'; Morán (yellow card) 65'; Araujo 68'; Christodoulopoulos (yellow card) 72'; Livaja (yellow card) 84'	Stadium: Peristeri Stadium; Attendance: 1,013; Referee: Anastasios Sidiropoulos (Dodecanese); Man of the Match: Amr Warda

4 March 2018 24	AEK Athens	1–0	Panionios	Marousi
17:15 EET (UTC+2)	Vranješ (yellow card) 8'; Livaja 21', (yellow card) 45'; Lampropoulos (yellow card) 90+2'	Report	Spiridonović (yellow card) 45'; Saramantas (yellow card) 77'; Banana (yellow card) 85'; Savvidis (yellow card) 90+4'	Stadium: Olympic Stadium; Attendance: 12,931; Referee: Alexandros Aretopoulos (Trikala); Man of the Match: Marko Livaja

11 March 2018 25	PAOK	0−3 (Awarded)	AEK Athens	Thessaloniki
19:30 EET (UTC+2)	Matos (yellow card) 4'; Campos (yellow card) 19'; Crespo (yellow card) 38'; Pelkas (yellow card) 57'; Maurício (yellow card) 86'; Varela 90'	Report	Bakasetas (yellow card) 10'; Galo (yellow card) 25'; Araujo (yellow card) 54'; Christodoulopoulos (yellow card) 87'	Stadium: Toumba Stadium; Attendance: 21,431; Referee: Georgios Kominis (Thesprotia)
Note: In the 90th minute PAOK took the lead with a header by Varela, while his teammate, Mauricio, who participated in the effort, was in a prominent offside position. The referee initially showed goal, but after seconds of protests by players of AEK to the linesman and after a discussion between him and the referee, they decided to cancel the goal as offside. As a result, the owner of PAOK, Ivan Savvidis, entered the pitch with bodyguards in order to get the team and leave. When the captain of PAOK, Vieirinha nodded him not to do so, Savvidis attacked the referee and as he pulled out his jacket, a gun was revealed attached to his belt. Then the referee decided to stop the match and sent the teams to the locker rooms, for threats against himself, his assistants and staff members of the AEK by Ivan Savvidis and Ľuboš Micheľ. Afterwards, the referee returned to the pitch with the players of PAOK to continue the match with the score at 1–0, but the players of AEK refused to come out in fear for their lives. The match was abandoned with the score at 1–0, but on court AEK were vindicated and were awarded the victory by 0–3 without a match.

1 April 2018 26	AEK Athens	3−0	Panathinaikos	Marousi
19:30 EEST (UTC+3)	Araujo 30', 68'; Galo 52'; Vranješ (yellow card) 60'	Report	Kourbelis (yellow card) 10'; Insúa (yellow card) 11' (yellow-red card) 34'	Stadium: Olympic Stadium; Attendance: 27,106; Referee: Dimitrios Thanos (Grevena); Man of the Match: Sergio Araujo

15 April 2018 27	Platanias	0−1	AEK Athens	Chania
19:30 EEST (UTC+3)	Patralis (yellow card) 66'; Udoji (yellow card) 78'	Report	Christodoulopoulos 39'; Galanopoulos (yellow card) 55'	Stadium: Perivolia Municipal Stadium; Attendance: 2,751; Referee: Stefanos Koubarakis (Thrace); Man of the Match: Lazaros Christodoulopoulos

22 April 2018 28	AEK Athens	2−0	Levadiakos	Marousi
19:00 EEST (UTC+3)	Bakasetas 12' (pen.), 33'	Report	Mitropoulos (yellow card) 20'; Adilehou (yellow card) 48'; Zaradoukas (yellow card) 89'	Stadium: Olympic Stadium; Attendance: 50,141; Referee: Athanasios Tzilos (Larissa); Man of the Match: Anastasios Bakasetas

29 April 2018 29	Kerkyra	0–0	AEK Athens	Corfu
19:00 EEST (UTC+3)	Zorbas (yellow card) 51'; Gromitsaris (yellow card) 76'	Report	Mantalos (yellow card) 82'; Tsintotas (yellow card) 90+3'	Stadium: Kerkyra Stadium; Attendance: 1,364; Referee: Ioannis Neofitiadis (Corinth); Man of the Match: Fotis Koutzavasilis

5 May 2018 30	Apollon Smyrnis	0−1	AEK Athens	Rizoupoli
19:00 EEST (UTC+3)	Papazoglou (yellow card) 32' (yellow-red card) 90+3'; Kontoes (yellow card) 47'	Report	Livaja (yellow card) 28'; Araujo 34'; Simões (yellow card) 88'	Stadium: Georgios Kamaras Stadium; Attendance: 12,950; Referee: Georgios Tzovaras (Phthiotis); Man of the Match: Sergio Araujo

=== Greek Cup ===
==== Group C ====
Pos	Team	Pld	W	D	L	GF	GA	GD	Pts	Qualification	AEK	LAM	APL	KAL
1	AEK Athens	3	3	0	0	12	2	+10	9	Round of 16		2–0	—	—
2	Lamia	3	2	0	1	3	3	0	6	Round of 16	—		—	1–0
3	Apollon Larissa	3	1	0	2	3	10	−7	3		0–7	0–2		—
4	Kallithea	3	0	0	3	3	6	−3	0		2–3	—	1–2	

Source: epo.gr
Rules for classification: 1) points, 2) head-to-head points, 3) head-to-head goal difference, 4) head-to-head best offense, 5) overall goal difference, 6) overall best offense, 7) overall best defense

==== Matches ====
20 September 2017 1	AEK Athens	2–0	Lamia	Rizoupoli
20:30 EEST (UTC+3)	Vinícius (yellow card) 3'; Tzanetopoulos (yellow card) 28'; Christodoulopoulos 49' (pen.); Livaja (yellow card) 78'; Mantalos 80'	Report	Anastasopoulos (yellow card) 35'; Papargyriou (yellow card) 48'; Bouloulis (yellow card) 66'; Frangos (yellow card) 78'	Stadium: Georgios Kamaras Stadium; Attendance: Behind closed doors Referee: Dimitris Styliaras (Aetoloacarnania); Man of the Match: Anastasios Bakasetas

26 October 2017 2	Apollon Larissa	0–7	AEK Athens	Larissa
19:30 EEST (UTC+3)	Milić (yellow card) 27'; Savvas (yellow card) 55'	Report	Tzanetopoulos 19'; Christodoulopoulos 22', 42'; Ajdarević 36'; Bakasetas 40'; Araujo 51'; Traustason 79'	Stadium: Alcazar Stadium; Referee: Vasilis Fotias (Pella); Man of the Match: Anastasios Bakasetas

30 November 2017 3	Kallithea	2–3	AEK Athens	Kallithea
19:30 EET (UTC+2)	Papangelis 32'; Talento 38' (pen.); Mingos (yellow card) 56'	Report	Tzanetopoulos 8', (yellow card) 37'; Giousis 30', 77'	Stadium: Grigoris Lambrakis Stadium; Referee: Andreas Gamaris (Athens); Man of the Match: Christos Giousis

===== Round of 16 =====
20 December 2017 First leg	Panetolikos	0−4	AEK Athens	Agrinio
19:30 EET (UTC+2)	Rocha (yellow card) 10'; Paulo (yellow card) 44'; Mihaj (yellow card) 67'	Report	Kone (yellow card) 7'; Lopes 22'; Christodoulopoulos 45' (pen.); Bakasetas 46'; Galo (yellow card) 57', (goal) 65'; Giakoumakis 87'	Stadium: Panetolikos Stadium; Referee: Praxitelis Zachariadis (Macedonia); Man of the Match: Anastasios Bakasetas

9 January 2018 Second leg	AEK Athens	1−0 (5–0 agg.)	Panetolikos	Marousi
19:30 EET (UTC+2)	Lopes 65'; Ajdarević (yellow card) 90+1'	Report	Marinakis (yellow card) 61'; Gianniotis (yellow card) 82'	Stadium: Olympic Stadium; Referee: Alexandros Tsamouris (Piraeus); Man of the Match: Masoud Shojaei

===== Quarter-finals =====
24 January 2018 First leg	Olympiacos	0–0	AEK Athens	Piraeus
19:30 EET (UTC+2)	Romao (yellow card) 33'; Sebá (yellow card) 53'; Mirallas (yellow card) 60'; Cissé (yellow card) 88'	Report	Kone (yellow card) 31'; Simões (yellow card) 53'; Araujo (yellow card) 60'; Livaja (yellow card) 67'	Stadium: Karaiskakis Stadium; Attendance: 30,000; Referee: Anastasios Sidiropoulos (Dodecanese); Man of the Match: Guillaume Gillet

7 February 2018 Second leg	AEK Athens	2–1 (2–1 agg.)	Olympiacos	Marousi
19:30 EET (UTC+2)	Chyhrynskyi (yellow card) 44'; Christodoulopoulos 57'; Araujo 73', (yellow card) 74'; Vranješ (yellow card) 76'; Barkas (yellow card) 83'; Kone (yellow card) 90+4'	Report	Mirallas (yellow card) 83'; Tachtsidis 83'	Stadium: Olympic Stadium; Attendance: 22,035; Referee: Georgios Kominis (Thesprotia); Man of the Match: Michalis Bakakis

===== Semi-finals =====
1 March 2018 First leg	AEL	2–1	AEK Athens	Larissa
19:30 EET (UTC+2)	Andoni (yellow card) 17'; Nazlidis (yellow card) 30', (goal) 57'; Milosavljević (yellow card) 35'; Wallace (yellow card) 42'; Žižić (yellow card) 89'; Križman 90+2'	Report	Lampropoulos (yellow card) 13'; Vranješ (yellow card) 30'; Masoud 51', (yellow card) 55'; Christodoulopoulos (yellow card) 73'	Stadium: AEL FC Arena; Referee: Praxitelis Zachariadis (Macedonia); Man of the Match: Thomas Nazlidis

18 April 2018 Second leg	AEK Athens	1–0 (2(a)–2 agg.)	AEL	Marousi
19:30 EEST (UTC+3)	Kone (yellow card) 61'; Christodoulopoulos 90+4'	Report	Milosavljević (yellow card) 23'; Golias (yellow card) 45'; Hubchev (yellow card) 45'; Masouras (yellow card) 83'; Božović (yellow card) 89'; Perrone (yellow card) 90'	Stadium: Olympic Stadium; Referee: Anastasios Papapetrou (Athens); Man of the Match: Lazaros Christodoulopoulos

===== Final =====
12 May 2018 Final	AEK Athens	0–2	PAOK	Marousi
20:30 EEST (UTC+3)	Livaja (yellow card) 45'; Vranješ (yellow card) 64' (yellow-red card) 81'; Bakasetas (yellow card) 71'; Galanopoulos (yellow card) 89'	Report	Campos (yellow card) 6'; Matos (yellow card) 21'; Prijović (penalty missed) 25'; Crespo (yellow card) 45+1'; Vieirinha 66', (yellow card) 66'; Maurício (red card) 81'; Varela (yellow card) 81' (yellow-red card) 90+5'; Pelkas 90+2', (yellow card) 90+3'	Stadium: Olympic Stadium; Attendance: 35,545; Referee: David Fernández Borbalán (Spain); Man of the Match: Vieirinha

=== UEFA Champions League ===
==== Third qualifying round ====
The draw for the third qualifying round was held on 14 July 2017.

25 July 2017 First leg	AEK Athens (Greece)	0–2	(Russia) CSKA Moscow	Athens, Greece
20:30 EEST (UTC+3)	Rodríguez (yellow card) 90'	Report	Dzagoev 45+1'; Wernbloom 56'	Stadium: Olympic Stadium; Attendance: 25,083; Referee: Marco Fritz (Germany); Man of the Match: Alan Dzagoev

2 August 2017 Second leg	CSKA Moscow (Russia)	1−0 (3–0 agg.)	(Greece) AEK Athens	Moscow, Russia
20:00 EEST (UTC+3)	Golovin (yellow card) 38'; Fernandes (yellow card) 59'; Vasin (yellow card) 67'; Natkho 74'	Report	Vranješ (yellow card) 20'; Mantalos (yellow card) 34'; Christodoulopoulos (yellow card) 90+4'	Stadium: VEB Arena; Attendance: 12,000; Referee: Benoît Millot (France); Man of the Match: Bibras Natkho

=== UEFA Europa League ===
==== Play-off round ====
The draw for the play-off round was held on 4 August 2017.

17 August 2017 First leg	Club Brugge (Belgium)	0–0	(Greece) AEK Athens	Bruges, Belgium
21:45 EEST (UTC+3)	Wesley (yellow card) 66'; Vormer (yellow card) 74'; Denswil (yellow card) 90'	Report	Livaja (yellow card) 15' (yellow-red card) 58'; Vranješ (yellow card) 23'; Lopes (yellow card) 54'; Ćosić (yellow card) 68'	Stadium: Jan Breydel Stadium; Attendance: 27,115; Referee: Viktor Kassai (Hungary)

24 August 2017 Second leg	AEK Athens (Greece)	3–0 (3–0 agg.)	(Belgium) Club Brugge	Athens, Greece
21:00 EEST (UTC+3)	Christodoulopoulos 27' (pen.); Simões 39', 90+1'; Bakakis (yellow card) 51'	Report	Palacios (yellow card) 25'; Nakamba (yellow card) 64'	Stadium: Olympic Stadium; Attendance: 14,275; Referee: Jesús Gil Manzano (Spain); Man of the Match: André Simões

==== Group stage ====
The draw for the group stage was held on 25 August 2017.

Pos	Team	Pld	W	D	L	GF	GA	GD	Pts	Qualification	MIL	AEK	RJK	AW
1	(Italy) Milan	6	3	2	1	13	6	+7	11	Advance to knockout phase	—	0–0	3–2	5–1
2	(Greece) AEK Athens	6	1	5	0	6	5	+1	8	Advance to knockout phase	0–0	—	2–2	2–2
3	(Croatia) Rijeka	6	2	1	3	11	12	−1	7		2–0	1–2	—	1–4
4	Austria Wien	6	1	2	3	9	16	−7	5		1–5	0–0	1–3	—

Source: UEFA
Rules for classification: Group stage tiebreakers

===== Matches =====
14 September 2017 1	Rijeka (Croatia)	1–2	(Greece) AEK Athens	Rijeka, Croatia
20:00 EEST (UTC+3)	Elez 29'; Mišić (yellow card) 39'; Bradarić (yellow card) 42'	Report	Mantalos 16'; Christodoulopoulos 62'; Lopes (yellow card) 64'; Simões (yellow card) 71'; Araujo (yellow card) 87'	Stadium: Stadion Rujevica; Attendance: 5,932; Referee: John Beaton (Scotland); Man of the Match: Ognjen Vranješ

28 September 2017 2	AEK Athens (Greece)	2–2	Austria Wien	Athens, Greece
22:05 EEST (UTC+3)	Livaja 28', 90' (yellow card) 77'; Galo (yellow card) 62'; Vranješ (yellow card) 74'	Report	Abdullahi (yellow card) 15'; Monschein 43'; Tajouri-Shradi 49'	Stadium: Olympic Stadium; Attendance: 16,954; Referee: Paweł Gil (Poland); Man of the Match: Marko Livaja

19 October 2017 3	Milan (Italy)	0–0	(Greece) AEK Athens	Milan, Italy
22:05 EEST (UTC+3)	Locatelli (yellow card) 37'	Report	Simões (yellow card) 28'; Mantalos (yellow card) 73'; Livaja (yellow card) 79'	Stadium: San Siro; Attendance: 20,812; Referee: Andreas Ekberg (Sweden); Man of the Match: Giannis Anestis

2 November 2017 4	AEK Athens (Greece)	0–0	(Italy) Milan	Athens, Greece
20:00 EET (UTC+2)	Ćosić (yellow card) 58'	Report	Musacchio (yellow card) 18'; Locatelli (yellow card) 41'	Stadium: Olympic Stadium; Attendance: 40,538; Referee: Jorge Sousa (Portugal); Man of the Match: Rodrigo Galo

23 November 2017 5	AEK Athens (Greece)	2–2	(Croatia) Rijeka	Athens, Greece
22:05 EET (UTC+2)	Lopes (yellow card) 40'; Araujo 45+2'; Christodoulopoulos 55'	Report	Gorgon 8', 26', (yellow card) 18'; Maleš (yellow card) 23'; Acosty (yellow card) 66'; Gavranović (yellow card) 80'	Stadium: Olympic Stadium; Attendance: 17,100; Referee: Mattias Gestranius (Finland); Man of the Match: Michalis Bakakis

7 December 2017 6	Austria Wien	0−0	(Greece) AEK Athens	Vienna, Austria
20:00 EET (UTC+2)	Abdullahi (yellow card) 69'	Report	Vranješ (yellow card) 43'; Chyhrynskyi (yellow card) 67'; Bakakis (yellow card) 75'	Stadium: Ernst-Happel-Stadion; Attendance: 23,133; Referee: Craig Pawson (England); Man of the Match: Ognjen Vranješ

==== Knockout phase ====
===== Round of 32 =====
The draw for the round of 32 was held on 11 December 2017.

15 February 2018 First leg	AEK Athens (Greece)	1–1	(Ukraine) Dynamo Kyiv	Athens, Greece
22:05 EET (UTC+2)	Livaja (yellow card) 22'; Vranješ (yellow card) 45'; Ajdarević 80'	Report	Khacheridi (yellow card) 5'; Tsyhankov 19'; Harmash (yellow card) 30'; Moraes (yellow card) 77'; González (yellow card) 81'	Stadium: Olympic Stadium; Attendance: 30,518; Referee: Carlos del Cerro Grande (Spain)

22 February 2018 Second leg	Dynamo Kyiv (Ukraine)	0–0 (1(a)–1 agg.)	(Greece) AEK Athens	Kyiv, Ukraine
20:00 EET (UTC+2)	Moraes (yellow card) 90+3'	Report	Simões (yellow card) 19'; Galanopoulos (yellow card) 29'; Galo (yellow card) 59'; Masoud (yellow card) 80'; Chyhrynskyi (yellow card) 90'; Araujo (yellow card) 90+2'	Stadium: NSC Olimpiyskiy; Attendance: 27,014; Referee: Matej Jug (Slovenia)

== Statistics ==
=== Squad statistics ===
As of 12 May 2018

No.	Pos	Player	Super League		Greek Cup		Champions League		Europa League		Total	
No.	Pos	Player	Apps	Goals	Apps	Goals	Apps	Goals	Apps	Goals	Apps	Goals
Goalkeepers
1	GK	(Greece) Vasilis Barkas	5	0	7	0	0	0	2	0	14	0
16	GK	(Greece) Panagiotis Tsintotas	15	0	2	0	0	0	1	0	18	0
22	GK	(Greece) Giannis Anestis	10	0	0	0	2	0	7	0	19	0
87	GK	(Greece) Panagiotis Dounis	0	0	0	0	0	0	0	0	0	0
98	GK	(Greece) Thanasis Pantos	0	0	0	0	0	0	0	0	0	0
Defenders
2	DF	(Greece) Michalis Bakakis	26	0	5	0	2	0	10	0	43	0
3	DF	(Portugal) Hélder Lopes	19	1	4	1	1	0	7	0	31	2
4	DF	(Bosnia and Herzegovina) Ognjen Vranješ	19	4	3	0	2	0	9	0	33	4
5	DF	(Greece) Vasilios Lampropoulos	19	0	7	0	0	0	2	0	28	0
12	DF	(Brazil) Rodrigo Galo	27	1	8	1	1	0	8	0	44	2
15	DF	(Serbia) Uroš Ćosić	9	0	2	0	1	0	5	0	17	0
19	DF	(Ukraine) Dmytro Chyhrynskyi	15	1	5	0	2	0	5	0	27	1
23	DF	(Sweden) Niklas Hult	8	0	2	0	0	0	0	0	10	0
33	DF	(Greece) Giorgos Giannoutsos	1	0	3	0	0	0	0	0	4	0
55	DF	(Greece) Adam Tzanetopoulos	1	0	4	2	0	0	2	0	7	2
Midfielders
6	MF	(Albania) Astrit Ajdarević	16	0	5	1	1	0	5	1	27	2
8	MF	(Portugal) André Simões	20	0	4	0	2	0	9	2	35	2
18	MF	(Sweden) Jakob Johansson	8	1	1	0	2	0	6	0	17	1
20	MF	(Greece) Petros Mantalos	12	2	1	1	2	0	5	1	20	4
21	MF	(Greece) Panagiotis Kone	13	1	5	0	0	0	2	0	20	1
24	MF	(Iran) Masoud Shojaei	12	0	5	1	0	0	1	0	18	1
25	MF	(Greece) Konstantinos Galanopoulos	19	0	5	0	1	0	9	0	34	0
32	MF	(Greece) Paris Babis	0	0	0	0	0	0	0	0	0	0
39	MF	(Spain) Erik Morán	7	0	2	0	0	0	0	0	9	0
Forwards
7	FW	(Greece) Lazaros Christodoulopoulos	27	7	7	6	2	0	10	3	46	16
9	FW	(Greece) Giorgos Giakoumakis	11	1	5	1	1	0	3	0	20	2
10	FW	(Croatia) Marko Livaja	27	8	4	0	2	0	8	2	41	10
11	FW	(Argentina) Sergio Araujo	23	11	8	2	0	0	8	1	39	14
14	FW	(Greece) Anastasios Bakasetas	27	6	8	2	0	0	8	0	43	8
28	FW	(Belgium) Victor Klonaridis	12	1	4	0	2	0	6	0	24	1
31	FW	(Greece) Dimitris Melikiotis	0	0	0	0	0	0	0	0	0	0
70	FW	(Greece) Christos Antoniou	0	0	0	0	0	0	0	0	0	0
77	FW	(Greece) Christos Giousis	1	0	2	2	0	0	0	0	3	2
Left during Summer Transfer Window
—	FW	(Portugal) Hugo Almeida	1	1	0	0	1	0	1	0	3	1
Left during Winter Transfer Window
17	DF	(Brazil) Vinícius Freitas	3	0	3	0	0	0	0	0	6	0
30	MF	(Iceland) Arnór Ingvi Traustason	3	0	2	1	0	0	0	0	5	1
29	FW	(Argentina) Patito Rodríguez	2	0	1	0	1	0	1	0	5	0
40	FW	(Greece) Andreas Vlachomitros	1	0	1	0	0	0	0	0	2	0

=== Goalscorers ===
As of 12 May 2018
The list is sorted by competition order when total goals are equal, then by position and then by squad number.

Rank	No.	Pos.	Player	Super League	Greek Cup	Champions League	Europa League	Total
1	7	FW	(Greece) Lazaros Christodoulopoulos	7	6	0	3	16
2	11	FW	(Argentina) Sergio Araujo	11	2	0	1	14
3	10	FW	(Croatia) Marko Livaja	8	0	0	2	10
4	14	FW	(Greece) Anastasios Bakasetas	6	2	0	0	8
5	20	MF	(Greece) Petros Mantalos	2	1	0	1	4
5	4	DF	(Bosnia and Herzegovina) Ognjen Vranješ	4	0	0	0	4
7	8	MF	(Portugal) André Simões	0	0	0	2	2
7	77	FW	(Greece) Christos Giousis	0	2	0	0	2
7	3	DF	(Portugal) Hélder Lopes	1	1	0	0	2
7	55	DF	(Greece) Adam Tzanetopoulos	0	2	0	0	2
7	9	FW	(Greece) Giorgos Giakoumakis	1	1	0	0	2
7	6	MF	(Albania) Astrit Ajdarević	0	1	0	1	2
7	12	DF	(Brazil) Rodrigo Galo	1	1	0	0	2
14	28	FW	(Belgium) Victor Klonaridis	1	0	0	0	1
14	18	MF	(Sweden) Jakob Johansson	1	0	0	0	1
14	21	MF	(Greece) Panagiotis Kone	1	0	0	0	1
14	19	DF	(Ukraine) Dmytro Chyhrynskyi	1	0	0	0	1
14	23	MF	(Iran) Masoud Shojaei	0	1	0	0	1
14	—	FW	(Portugal) Hugo Almeida	1	0	0	0	1
14	30	FW	(Iceland) Arnór Traustason	0	1	0	0	1
Own goals				1	0	0	0	1
Totals				47	21	0	10	78

=== Hat-tricks ===
Numbers in superscript represent the goals that the player scored.

Player	Against	Result	Date	Competition	Source
(Bosnia and Herzegovina) Ognjen Vranješ	(Greece) Xanthi	4–0 (H)	18 February 2018	Super League	

=== Assists ===
As of 12 May 2018
The list is sorted by competition order when total assists are equal, then by position and then by squad number.

Rank	No.	Pos.	Player	Super League	Greek Cup	Champions League	Europa League	Total
1	14	FW	(Greece) Anastasios Bakasetas	4	3	0	0	7
2	10	FW	(Croatia) Marko Livaja	5	1	0	0	6
3	11	FW	(Argentina) Sergio Araujo	3	1	0	1	5
4	12	DF	(Brazil) Rodrigo Galo	4	0	0	0	4
4	7	FW	(Greece) Lazaros Christodoulopoulos	1	2	0	1	4
6	6	MF	(Albania) Astrit Ajdarević	3	0	0	0	3
6	8	MF	(Portugal) André Simões	2	0	0	1	3
6	2	DF	(Greece) Michalis Bakakis	1	1	0	1	3
9	20	MF	(Greece) Petros Mantalos	2	0	0	0	2
9	3	DF	(Portugal) Hélder Lopes	1	1	0	0	2
9	28	FW	(Belgium) Victor Klonaridis	0	2	0	0	2
12	19	DF	(Ukraine) Dmytro Chyhrynskyi	1	0	0	0	1
12	23	DF	(Sweden) Niklas Hult	1	0	0	0	1
12	39	MF	(Spain) Erik Morán	0	1	0	0	1
12	21	MF	(Greece) Panagiotis Kone	0	1	0	0	1
12	23	MF	(Iran) Masoud Shojaei	0	1	0	0	1
Totals				28	14	0	4	46

=== Clean sheets ===
As of 12 May 2018
The list is sorted by competition order when total clean sheets are equal and then by squad number. Clean sheets in games where both goalkeepers participated are awarded to the goalkeeper who started the game. Goalkeepers with no appearances are not included.

Rank	No.	Player	Super League	Greek Cup	Champions League	Europa League	Total
1	16	(Greece) Panagiotis Tsintotas	9	2	0	1	12
2	22	(Greece) Giannis Anestis	6	0	0	4	10
3	1	(Greece) Vasilis Barkas	4	4	0	1	9
Totals			19	6	0	6	31

=== Disciplinary record ===
As of 12 May 2018

N	P	Nat.	Name	Super League			Greek Cup			Champions League			Europa League			Total			Notes
N	P	Nat.	Name	Yellow card	Second yellow card	Red card	Yellow card	Second yellow card	Red card	Yellow card	Second yellow card	Red card	Yellow card	Second yellow card	Red card	Yellow card	Second yellow card	Red card	Notes
Goalkeepers
1	GK	(Greece)	Vasilis Barkas				1									1			
16	GK	(Greece)	Panagiotis Tsintotas	1												1			
22	GK	(Greece)	Giannis Anestis	1												1			
87	GK	(Greece)	Panagiotis Dounis																
98	GK	(Greece)	Thanasis Pantos																
Defenders
2	DF	(Greece)	Michalis Bakakis	4									2			6			
3	DF	(Portugal)	Hélder Lopes	2			1						3			6			
4	DF	(Bosnia and Herzegovina)	Ognjen Vranješ	8			4	1		1			4			17	1		
5	DF	(Greece)	Vasilios Lampropoulos	2			1									3			
12	DF	(Brazil)	Rodrigo Galo	1			1						2			4			
15	DF	(Serbia)	Uroš Ćosić	3		1							2			5		1	
19	DF	(Ukraine)	Dmytro Chyhrynskyi	1			1						2			4			
23	DF	(Sweden)	Niklas Hult																
33	DF	(Greece)	Giorgos Giannoutsos	1												1			
55	DF	(Greece)	Adam Tzanetopoulos				2									2			
Midfielders
6	MF	(Albania)	Astrit Ajdarević	1			1									2			
8	MF	(Portugal)	André Simões	5			1						3			9			
18	MF	(Sweden)	Jakob Johansson	3												3			
20	MF	(Greece)	Petros Mantalos	5						1			1			7			
21	MF	(Greece)	Panagiotis Kone	2			4									6			
23	MF	(Iran)	Masoud Shojaei	1			1						1			3			
25	MF	(Greece)	Konstantinos Galanopoulos	6			1						1			8			
32	MF	(Greece)	Paris Babis																
39	MF	(Spain)	Erik Morán	2												2			
Forwards
7	FW	(Greece)	Lazaros Christodoulopoulos	4			1			1						6			
9	FW	(Greece)	Giorgos Giakoumakis																
10	FW	(Croatia)	Marko Livaja	9			3						5	1		17	1		
11	FW	(Argentina)	Sergio Araujo	7		1	2						2			11		1	
14	FW	(Greece)	Anastasios Bakasetas	3			1									4			
28	FW	(Belgium)	Victor Klonaridis																
31	FW	(Greece)	Dimitris Melikiotis																
70	FW	(Greece)	Christos Antoniou																
77	FW	(Greece)	Christos Giousis																
Left during Summer Transfer window
—	FW	(Portugal)	Hugo Almeida			1												1	
Left during Winter Transfer window
17	DF	(Brazil)	Vinícius Freitas				1									1			
30	DF	(Iceland)	Arnór Ingvi Traustason																
29	FW	(Argentina)	Patito Rodríguez							1						1			
40	FW	(Greece)	Andreas Vlachomitros																

=== Starting 11 ===
This section presents the most frequently used formation along with the players with the most starts across all competitions.

N.	Formation	Matchday(s)
21	3–5–2	2, 9–13, 15–17, 21
16	4–4–2	7, 8, 14, 18, 22–26, 28
11	4–2–3–1	1, 3–5, 19, 20, 27
3	4–3–3	6, 29
1	4–2–1–3	30

No.	Nat.	Player	Pos.
22	(Greece)	Giannis Anestis	GK
4	(Bosnia and Herzegovina)	Ognjen Vranješ	RCB
19	(Ukraine)	Dmytro Chyhrynskyi	CB
2	(Greece)	Michalis Bakakis	LCB
8	(Portugal)	André Simões (C)	DM
14	(Greece)	Anastasios Bakasetas	CM
12	(Brazil)	Rodrigo Galo	RM
3	(Portugal)	Hélder Lopes	LM
10	(Croatia)	Marko Livaja	AM
7	(Greece)	Lazaros Christodoulopoulos	SS
11	(Argentina)	Sergio Araujo	CF

Last updated: 2018-05-12

== Awards ==
Player	Pos.	Award	Source
(Greece) Petros Mantalos	MF	MVP Award (3rd Matchday)	
(Greece) Petros Mantalos	MF	Best Goal Award (3rd Matchday)	
(Greece) Lazaros Christodoulopoulos	FW	MVP Award (5th Matchday)	
(Greece) Lazaros Christodoulopoulos	FW	Best Goal Award (5th Matchday)	
(Croatia) Marko Livaja	FW	MVP Award (10th Matchday)	
(Croatia) Marko Livaja	FW	MVP Award (11th Matchday)	
(Croatia) Marko Livaja	FW	MVP Award (12th Matchday)	
(Croatia) Marko Livaja	FW	MVP Award (13th Matchday)	
(Greece) Anastasios Bakasetas	FW	MVP Award (16th Matchday)	
(Greece) Anastasios Bakasetas	FW	Best Goal Award (16th Matchday)	
(Greece) Lazaros Christodoulopoulos	FW	Best Goal Award (19th Matchday)	
(Greece) Giorgos Giakoumakis	FW	MVP Award (20th Matchday)	
(Greece) Giorgos Giakoumakis	FW	Best Goal Award (20th Matchday)	
(Bosnia and Herzegovina) Ognjen Vranješ	DF	MVP Award (22nd Matchday)	
(Argentina) Sergio Araujo	FW	MVP Award (26th Matchday)	
(Argentina) Sergio Araujo	FW	Best Goal Award (20th Matchday)	
(Greece) Anastasios Bakasetas	FW	MVP Award (16th Matchday)	
(Greece) Lazaros Christodoulopoulos	FW	Greek Cup Top Scorer (shared)	
(Greece) Lazaros Christodoulopoulos	FW	Greek Player of the Season	
(Spain) Manolo Jiménez	—	Manager of the Season	
(Ukraine) Dmytro Chyhrynskyi	DF	Team of the Season	
(Portugal) André Simões	MF	Team of the Season	
(Greece) Lazaros Christodoulopoulos	FW	Team of the Season	
(Croatia) Marko Livaja	FW	Team of the Season	
