= 2017–18 Greek Football Cup =

2017–18 Greek Cup

Tournament details
- Country: Greece
- Teams: 33

Final positions
- Champions: PAOK (6th title)
- Runners-up: AEK Athens

Tournament statistics
- Matches played: 76
- Goals scored: 199 (2.62 per match)
- Top goal scorer(s): Pedro Conde; Aleksandar Prijović; Lazaros Christodoulopoulos (6 goals each)

The 2017–18 Greek Football Cup was the 76th edition of the Greek Football Cup. A total of 33 clubs were accepted to enter. The competition commenced in September 2017 with the preliminary round and concluded on 12 May 2018 with the Final. PAOK won the competition for second consecutive year beating AEK Athens 2–0 in the final held at the Olympic Stadium.

== Teams ==
Round	Clubs remaining	Clubs involved	Winners from previous round	New entries	Leagues entering
Preliminary Round	33	2	none	2	Football League
Group Stage	32	32	1	31	Super League
Round of 16	16	16	16	none	none
Quarter-finals	8	8	8	none	none
Semi-finals	4	4	4	none	none
Final	2	2	2	none	none

== Calendar ==
Round	Date(s)	Fixtures	Clubs	New entries
Preliminary Round	20 & 30 August 2017	2	33 → 32	2
Group Stage	19–21 September, 24–26 October & 28–30 November 2017	45	32 → 16	31
Round of 16	19–21 December 2017 & 9–11 January 2018	16	16 → 8	none
Quarter-finals	24, 25 January & 7, 8 February 2018	8	8 → 4	none
Semi-finals	27, 28 February, 1 March & 17–19 April 2018	4	4 → 2	none
Final	12 May 2018	1	2 → 1	none

== Participating clubs ==
2017–18 Super League	2017–18 Football League
AEK Athens; AEL; Apollon Smyrnis; Asteras Tripolis; Atromitos; Kerkyra; Lamia; Levadiakos; Olympiacos; Panathinaikos; Panetolikos; Panionios; PAOK; PAS Giannina; Platanias; Xanthi	Acharnaikos; Aiginiakos; Anagennisi Karditsa; AO Chania−Kissamikos; Apollon Pontus; Apollon Larissa; Aris; Ergotelis; ~~Iraklis~~ (withdrawn); Kallithea; OFI; Panachaiki; Panegialios; Panserraikos; Sparta; Trikala; Veria

== Preliminary round ==
The draw for this round took place in August 2017.

=== Summary ===
Team 1	Agg.	Team 2	1st leg	2nd leg
Aiginiakos	2–2 (a)	Veria	1–0	1–2

=== Matches ===
20 August 2017
17:00 EEST

Aiginiakos	1–0	Veria
Zourkos 58'	Report

Giannis Paralikidis Stadium, Aiginio
Referee: Giorgos Tzovaras (Phthiotis)
30 August 2017
18:00 EEST

Veria	2–1	Aiginiakos
Eva 24'; Souliotis 88'	Report	Papadopoulos 90'

Veria Stadium, Veria
Referee: Ioannis Papadopoulos (Macedonia)

Aiginiakos won on away goals.

== Group stage ==
The draw for this round took place on 11 August 2017.

=== Group A ===
Pos	Team	Pld	W	D	L	GF	GA	GD	Pts	Qualification	OFI	PLA	APS	IRA
1	OFI	2	2	0	0	3	1	+2	6	Round of 16		1–0	2–1	—
2	Platanias	2	1	0	1	1	1	0	3	Round of 16	—		1–0	—
3	Apollon Smyrnis	2	0	0	2	1	3	−2	0		—	—		—
4	Iraklis (Note: Iraklis withdrew from the league because of Financial Problems. The founding club (Athlitiki Enosis Pontion Katerini) stopped to exist too. The original Gymnastikos Syllogos Iraklis would decide if a new football team will start from the Third Category of the local championship Macedonia Football Clubs Association, or if the football team of G.S. Iraklis will be merged with 1st category (A1) Macedonia Football Clubs Association club Iraklis Ampelokipi, as it happened before 5 years with Athlitiki Enosis Pontion Katerinis F.C.. The club was therefore automatically disqualified from the tournament.) (W)	0	0	0	0	0	0	0	0	Withdrew	—	—	—	

Source: epo.gr
Rules for classification: 1) points, 2) head-to-head points, 3) head-to-head goal difference, 4) head-to-head best offense, 5) overall goal difference, 6) overall best offense, 7) overall best defense
(W) Withdrew
Notes:
20 September 2017
16:00 EEST

Platanias	1–0	Apollon Smyrnis
Patralis 68'	Report

Perivolia Municipal Stadium, Chania
Referee: Aristotelis Diamantopoulos (Arcadia)

26 October 2017
17:15 EEST

OFI	1–0	Platanias
Chanti 9'	Report

Theodoros Vardinogiannis Stadium, Heraklion
Referee: Ioannis Neofytiadis (Corinthia)

28 November 2017
15:00 EET

OFI	2–1	Apollon Smyrnis
Ogkmpoe 81'; Ortega 90+1'	Report	Kitambala 61'

Theodoros Vardinogiannis Stadium, Heraklion
Referee: Aristotelis Diamantopoulos (Arcadia)

=== Group B ===
Pos	Team	Pld	W	D	L	GF	GA	GD	Pts	Qualification	PAOK	LEV	APP	AIG
1	PAOK	3	3	0	0	8	1	+7	9	Round of 16		2–1	—	—
2	Levadiakos	3	2	0	1	8	3	+5	6	Round of 16	—		—	5–0
3	Apollon Pontus	3	1	0	2	2	3	−1	3		0–1	1–2		—
4	Aiginiakos	3	0	0	3	0	11	−11	0		0–5	—	0–1	

Source: epo.gr
Rules for classification: 1) points, 2) head-to-head points, 3) head-to-head goal difference, 4) head-to-head best offense, 5) overall goal difference, 6) overall best offense, 7) overall best defense
19 September 2017
16:00 EEST

Aiginiakos	0–1	Apollon Pontus
	Report	Brito 84'

Giannis Paralikidis Stadium, Aiginio
Referee: Dimitris Maloutas (Imathia)
20 September 2017
18:15 EEST

PAOK	2–1	Levadiakos
Pelkas 41'; Shakhov 71'	Report	Giakoumakis 46'

Kaftanzoglio Stadium, Thessaloniki
Attendance: Behind closed doors
Referee: Alexandros Tsamouris (Piraeus)

24 October 2017
17:15 EEST

Levadiakos	5–0	Aiginiakos
Obiora 39'; Kapsaskis 47', 58'; Belghazouani 68'; Nikas 76'	Report

Levadia Municipal Stadium, Livadeia
Referee: Angelos Zaravinos (Athens)
25 October 2017
19:30 EEST

Apollon Pontus	0–1	PAOK
	Report	Mak 90'

Kalamaria Stadium, Thessaloniki
Referee: Stefanos Koubarakis (Thrace)

29 November 2017
15:00 EET

Aiginiakos	0–5	PAOK
	Report	Limnios 5'; Prijović 53', 67'; El Kaddouri 71'; Shakhov 82'

Kaftanzoglio Stadium, Thessaloniki
Referee: Konstantinos Kotsanis (Drama)
30 November 2017
17:15 EET

Apollon Pontus	1–2	Levadiakos
Samaras 55'	Report	Belghazouani 69'; Niasse 87'

Kalamaria Stadium, Thessaloniki
Referee: Vasilis Fotias (Pella)

=== Group C ===
Pos	Team	Pld	W	D	L	GF	GA	GD	Pts	Qualification	AEK	LAM	APL	KAL
1	AEK Athens	3	3	0	0	12	2	+10	9	Round of 16		2–0	—	—
2	Lamia	3	2	0	1	3	3	0	6	Round of 16	—		—	1–0
3	Apollon Larissa	3	1	0	2	3	10	−7	3		0–7	0–2		—
4	Kallithea	3	0	0	3	3	6	−3	0		2–3	—	1–2	

Source: epo.gr
Rules for classification: 1) points, 2) head-to-head points, 3) head-to-head goal difference, 4) head-to-head best offense, 5) overall goal difference, 6) overall best offense, 7) overall best defense
20 September 2017
20:30 EEST

AEK Athens	2–0	Lamia
Christodoulopoulos 49' (pen.); Mantalos 80'	Report

Georgios Kamaras Stadium, Rizoupoli
Attendance: Behind closed doors
Referee: Dimitris Styliaras (Aetoloacarnania)
21 September 2017
18:15 EET

Kallithea	1–2	Apollon Larissa
Zezaj 7'	Report	Sachinidis 15' (pen.), 63'

Grigoris Lambrakis Stadium, Kallithea
Referee: Alexandros Dragatis (East Attica)

24 October 2017
19:30 EEST

Lamia	1–0	Kallithea
Wanderson 70'	Report

Lamia Municipal Stadium, Lamia
Referee: Vangelis Gratsanis (Trikala)
26 October 2017
19:30 EEST

Apollon Larissa	0–7	AEK Athens
	Report	Tzanetopoulos 19'; Christodoulopoulos 22', 42'; Ajdarević 36'; Bakasetas 40'; Araujo 51'; Traustason 79'

Alcazar Stadium, Larissa
Referee: Vasilis Fotias (Pella)

28 November 2017
17:15 EET

Apollon Larissa	0–2	Lamia
	Report	Acosta 55'; Karagiannis 59'

Alcazar Stadium, Larissa
Referee: Georgios Vreskas (Pieria)
30 November 2017
19:30 EET

Kallithea	2–3	AEK Athens
Papangelis 32'; Talento 38' (pen.)	Report	Tzanetopoulos 8'; Giousis 30', 77'

Grigoris Lambrakis Stadium, Kallithea
Referee: Andreas Gamaris (Athens)

=== Group D ===
Pos	Team	Pld	W	D	L	GF	GA	GD	Pts	Qualification	ATR	TRI	KER	SPA
1	Atromitos	3	2	1	0	6	1	+5	7	Round of 16		—	1–0	—
2	Trikala	3	1	2	0	4	2	+2	5	Round of 16	1–1		0–0	—
3	Kerkyra	3	1	1	1	6	2	+4	4		—	—		6–1
4	Sparta	3	0	0	3	2	13	−11	0		0–4	1–3	—	

Source: epo.gr
Rules for classification: 1) points, 2) head-to-head points, 3) head-to-head goal difference, 4) head-to-head best offense, 5) overall goal difference, 6) overall best offense, 7) overall best defense
20 September 2017
16:00 EEST

Atromitos	1–0	Kerkyra
Warda 90+6'	Report

Peristeri Stadium, Peristeri
Referee: Athanasios Tzilos (Larissa)
21 September 2017
16:00 EEST

Sparta	1–3	Trikala
Ranos 37'	Report	Tsipras 2'; Golias 61'; Sialmas 88'

Sparta Municipal Stadium, Sparta
Referee: Evaggelos Manouchos (Argolida)

24 October 2017
15:00 EEST

Kerkyra	6–1	Sparta
Vargas 8'; Gromitsaris 28'; Kontos 34'; Georgiou 55'; Bauman 67'; Melikiotis 90'	Report	Belis 35'

Kerkyra Stadium, Corfu
Referee: Fotis Fotiadis (Kastoria)
26 October 2017
15:00 EEST

Trikala	1–1	Atromitos
Karasalidis 51' (o.g.)	Report	Manousos 75'

Trikala Municipal Stadium, Trikala
Referee: Giorgos Lamprou (Euboea)

28 November 2017
15:00 EET

Sparta	0–4	Atromitos
	Report	Madson 17'; Warda 28', 38'; Mensah 75'

Sparta Municipal Stadium, Sparta
Referee: Nikolaos Makrypodis (Achaea)
29 November 2017
17:15 EET

Trikala	0–0	Kerkyra
	Report

Trikala Municipal Stadium, Trikala
Referee: Aristomenis Koutsiaftis (Arta)

=== Group E ===
Pos	Team	Pld	W	D	L	GF	GA	GD	Pts	Qualification	OLY	AST	AOC	ACH
1	Olympiacos	3	2	1	0	6	2	+4	7	Round of 16		2–1	—	—
2	Asteras Tripolis	3	2	0	1	6	3	+3	6	Round of 16	—		2–1	—
3	AO Chania−Kissamikos	3	1	1	1	3	3	0	4		1–1	—		1–0
4	Acharnaikos	3	0	0	3	0	7	−7	0		0–3	0–3 (Note: walkover)	—	

Source: epo.gr
Rules for classification: 1) points, 2) head-to-head points, 3) head-to-head goal difference, 4) head-to-head best offense, 5) overall goal difference, 6) overall best offense, 7) overall best defense
Notes:
19 September 2017
20:30 EEST

Olympiacos	2−1	Asteras Tripolis
Emenike 71' (pen.), 78'	Report	Tsoukalas 84'

Karaiskakis Stadium, Piraeus
Referee: Ioannis Neofytiadis (Corinthia)
21 September 2017
16:00 EEST

AO Chania−Kissamikos	1−0	Acharnaikos
Xydas 64' (pen.)	Report

Perivolia Municipal Stadium, Chania
Referee: Giorgos Kounalakis (Xanthi)

25 October 2017
15:00 EEST

Acharnaikos	0−3	Olympiacos
	Report	Gillet 9'; Martins 48'; Emenike 90+1'

Neapoli Stadium, Nikaia
Referee: Andreas Gamaris (Athens)
26 October 2017
15:00 EEST

Asteras Tripolis	2−1	AO Chania−Kissamikos
Triantafyllopoulos 44'; Douvikas 64'	Report	Xydas 40' (pen.)

Theodoros Kolokotronis Stadium, Tripoli
Referee: Evangelos Manouchos (Argolida)

29 November 2017
15:00 EET

Acharnaikos	0−3 (Awarded)	Asteras Tripolis

Neapoli Stadium, Nikaia
29 November 2017
17:15 EET

AO Chania−Kissamikos	1−1	Olympiacos
Apostolidis 68'	Report	Đurđević 30'

Perivolia Municipal Stadium, Chania
Referee: Charalambos Sotiriadis (Lasithi)

=== Group F ===
Pos	Team	Pld	W	D	L	GF	GA	GD	Pts	Qualification	XAN	PNE	PNS	ERG
1	Xanthi	3	3	0	0	8	3	+5	9	Round of 16		2–0	—	—
2	Panetolikos	3	2	0	1	7	2	+5	6	Round of 16	—		2–0	—
3	Panserraikos	3	1	0	2	3	4	−1	3		1–2	—		2–0
4	Ergotelis	3	0	0	3	2	11	−9	0		2–4	0–5	—	

Source: epo.gr
Rules for classification: 1) points, 2) head-to-head points, 3) head-to-head goal difference, 4) head-to-head best offense, 5) overall goal difference, 6) overall best offense, 7) overall best defense
19 September 2017
16:00 EEST

Panserraikos	2–0	Ergotelis
Pozoglou 38'; Gkourtsas 48' (pen.)	Report

Serres Municipal Stadium, Serres
Referee: Stathis Gortsilas (Macedonia)
19 September 2017
18:15 EEST

Xanthi	2–0	Panetolikos
Castro 27'; Triadis 60'	Report

Xanthi FC Arena, Xanthi
Referee: Dimitrios Karantonis (Imathia)

25 October 2017
15:00 EEST

Ergotelis	2–4	Xanthi
Efford 50'; Rovithis 58' (pen.)	Report	Triadis 20', 26'; Kike 64'; Jendrišek 81'

Pankritio Stadium, Heraklion
Referee: Petros Tsagarakis (Chania)
25 October 2017
17:15 EEST

Panetolikos	2–0	Panserraikos
Paulo 8'; Markovski 85'	Report

Panetolikos Stadium, Agrinio
Referee: Evangelos Kordolemis (East Attica)

28 November 2017
17:15 EET

Panserraikos	1–2	Xanthi
Zygeridis 90'	Report	Castro 32'; Orfanidis 60' (pen.)

Serres Municipal Stadium, Serres
Referee: Athanasios Sezos (Kilkis)
30 November 2017
15:00 EET

Ergotelis	0–5	Panetolikos
	Report	Paulo 39'; Rosa 64'; Clésio 66', 89'; Mazurek 74'

Pankritio Stadium, Heraklion
Referee: Alexandros Tsamouris (Piraeus)

=== Group G ===
Pos	Team	Pld	W	D	L	GF	GA	GD	Pts	Qualification	PAS	PGSS	ARIS	PNG
1	PAS Giannina	3	1	2	0	5	2	+3	5	Round of 16		—	—	3–0
2	Panionios	3	1	1	1	3	3	0	4	Round of 16	1–1		—	—
3	Aris	3	1	1	1	3	3	0	4		1–1	1–2		—
4	Panegialios	3	1	0	2	1	4	−3	3		—	1–0	0–1	

Source: epo.gr
Rules for classification: 1) points, 2) head-to-head points, 3) head-to-head goal difference, 4) head-to-head best offense, 5) overall goal difference, 6) overall best offense, 7) overall best defense
21 September 2017
16:00 EEST

Panionios	1–1	PAS Giannina
Spiridonović 21'	Report	Giakos 84'

Nea Smyrni Stadium, Nea Smyrni
Referee: Giorgos Tzovaras (Phthiotis)
21 September 2017
20:30 EEST

Panegialios	0–1	Aris
	Report	Platellas 68'

Aigio National Stadium, Aigio
Referee: Angelos Adamopoulos (Zakynthos)

24 October 2017
15:00 EEST

PAS Giannina	3–0	Panegialios
Nikolias 33'; Skondras 50'; Conde 67'	Report

Zosimades Stadium, Ioannina
Referee: Nikolaos Poulimas (Corfu)
25 October 2017
21:30 EEST

Aris	1–2	Panionios
Pasas 74'	Report	Lamprou 39'; Yeşil 90+3'

Kleanthis Vikelidis Stadium, Thessaloniki
Referee: Dimitrios Karantonis (Imathia)

28 November 2017
19:30 EET

Aris	1–1	PAS Giannina
Milunović 60'	Report	Soltani 72'

Kleanthis Vikelidis Stadium, Thessaloniki
Referee: Alexandros Aretopoulos (Trikala)
30 November 2017
17:15 EET

Panegialios	1–0	Panionios
Kokkoris 50'	Report

Aigio National Stadium, Aigio
Referee: Konstantinos Balatsoukas (Thesprotia)

=== Group H ===
Pos	Team	Pld	W	D	L	GF	GA	GD	Pts	Qualification	PAO	AEL	PNC	ASA
1	Panathinaikos	3	2	1	0	5	2	+3	7	Round of 16		2–0	—	—
2	AEL	3	1	1	1	3	2	+1	4	Round of 16	—		3–0	—
3	Panachaiki	3	1	1	1	2	4	−2	4		1–1	—		1–0
4	Anagennisi Karditsa	3	0	1	2	1	3	−2	1		1–2	0–0	—	

Source: epo.gr
Rules for classification: 1) points, 2) head-to-head points, 3) head-to-head goal difference, 4) head-to-head best offense, 5) overall goal difference, 6) overall best offense, 7) overall best defense.
20 September 2017
18:15 EEST

Panachaiki	1–0	Anagennisi Karditsa
Eleftheriadis 79' (pen.)	Report

Kostas Davourlis Stadium, Patras
Referee: Georgios Markantonatos (Elis)
20 September 2017
20:30 EEST

Panathinaikos	2–0	AEL
Chávez 18'; Molins 90+4'	Report

Leoforos Alexandras Stadium, Ampelokipoi
Referee: Praxitelis Zachariadis (Macedonia)

24 October 2017
17:15 EEST

Anagennisi Karditsa	1–2	Panathinaikos
Plavoukos 14'	Report	Mounier 51'; Molins 90+1'

Municipal Stadium of Karditsa, Karditsa
Referee: Giorgos Tzovaras (Phthiotis)
25 October 2017
17:15 EEST

AEL	3–0	Panachaiki
Giannitsanis 9'; Perrone 51'; Križman 78'	Report

AEL FC Arena, Larissa
Referee: Manolis Skoulas (Thessaly)

29 November 2017
19:30 EET

Anagennisi Karditsa	0–0	AEL
	Report

Municipal Stadium of Karditsa, Karditsa
Referee: Vangelis Gratsanis (Trikala)
29 November 2017
19:30 EET

Panachaiki	1–1	Panathinaikos
Argyropoulos 40' (pen.)	Report	Hiljemark 29'

Kostas Davourlis Stadium, Patras
Attendance: 5,000
Referee: Georgios Blanas (Messinia)

== Knockout phase ==
Each tie in the knockout phase, apart from the final, was played over two legs, with each team playing one leg at home. The team that scored more goals on aggregate over the two legs advanced to the next round. If the aggregate score was level, the away goals rule was applied, i.e. the team that scored more goals away from home over the two legs advanced. If away goals were also equal, then extra time was played. The away goals rule was again applied after extra time, i.e. if there were goals scored during extra time and the aggregate score was still level, the visiting team advanced by virtue of more away goals scored. If no goals were scored during extra time, the winners were decided by a penalty shoot-out. In the final, which were played as a single match, if the score was level at the end of normal time, extra time was played, followed by a penalty shoot-out if the score was still level.
The mechanism of the draws for each round is as follows:

- In the draw for the round of 16, the eight group winners are seeded, and the eight group runners-up are unseeded.
  The seeded teams are drawn against the unseeded teams, with the seeded teams hosting the second leg.
- In the draws for the quarter-finals onwards, there are no seedings, and teams from the same group can be drawn against each other.

== Bracket ==
Round of 16
1	Levadiakos	1	0	1
16	PAS Giannina	0	4	4
8	AEL	3	0	3
9	Xanthi	0	2	2
5	Platanias	0	0	0
12	Olympiacos	2	2	4
4	Panetolikos	0	0	0
13	AEK Athens	4	1	5
6	Panionios	2	1	3
11	OFI	0	0	0
3	Lamia	4	0	4
14	Panathinaikos	1	1	2
7	Trikala	1	1	2
10	PAOK	5	2	7
2	Asteras Tripolis	0	0	0
15	Atromitos	1	1	2

Quarter-finals
PAS Giannina	1	2	3
AEL (a.e.t.)	2	3	5
Olympiacos	0	1	1
AEK Athens	0	2	2
Panionios	1	4	5
Lamia	0	1	1
PAOK	2	3	5
Atromitos	0	1	1

Semi-finals
AEL	2	0	2
AEK Athens (a)	1	1	2
Panionios	1	1	2
PAOK	3	3	6

Final
AEK Athens	0
PAOK	2

== Round of 16 ==
The draw for this round took place on 4 December 2017.

=== Seeding ===
Seeded teams Team OFI PAOK AEK Athens Atromitos Olympiacos Xanthi PAS Giannina Panathinaikos	Unseeded teams Team Platanias Levadiakos Lamia Trikala Asteras Tripolis Panetolikos Panionios AEL

=== Summary ===
Team 1	Agg.	Team 2	1st leg	2nd leg
Platanias	0–4	Olympiacos	0–2	0–2
Asteras Tripolis	0–2	Atromitos	0–1	0–1
Levadiakos	1–4	PAS Giannina	1–0	0–4
Lamia	4–2	Panathinaikos	4–1	0–1
Panetolikos	0–5	AEK Athens	0–4	0–1
Trikala	2–7	PAOK	1–5	1–2
Panionios	3–0	OFI	2–0	1–0
AEL	3–2	Xanthi	3–0	0–2

=== Matches ===
20 December 2017
17:15 EET

Platanias	0−2	Olympiacos
	Report	Botia 57'; Ansarifard 78'

Perivolia Municipal Stadium, Chania
Referee: Alexandros Katsikogiannis (Epirus)
10 January 2018
15:00 EET

Olympiacos	2−0	Platanias
Đurđević 68', 90+2'	Report

Karaiskakis Stadium, Piraeus
Referee: Aristomenis Koutsiaftis (Arta)

Olympiacos won 4–0 aggregate.

20 December 2017
15:00 EET

Asteras Tripolis	0−1	Atromitos
	Report	Vasilakakis 9'

Theodoros Kolokotronis Stadium, Tripoli
Referee: Aristidis Vatsios (West Attica)
11 January 2018
19:30 EET

Atromitos	1−0	Asteras Tripolis
Karasalidis 29'	Report

Peristeri Stadium, Peristeri
Referee: Anastasios Papapetrou (Athens)

Atromitos won 2–0 aggregate.

21 December 2017
19:30 EET

Levadiakos	1–0	PAS Giannina
Favaro 89'	Report

Levadia Municipal Stadium, Livadeia
Referee: Giorgos Tzovaras (Phthiotis)
10 January 2018
17:15 EET

PAS Giannina	4–0	Levadiakos
Tzimopoulos 30'; Conde 38', 79'; Garoufalias 90+2'	Report

Zosimades Stadium, Ioannina
Referee: Stavros Mantalos (Athens)

PAS Giannina won 4–1 aggregate.

21 December 2017
17:15 EET

Lamia	4–1	Panathinaikos
Piti 5', 45'; Panteliadis 42'; Blažić 90'	Report	Molins 82'

Lamia Municipal Stadium, Lamia
Referee: Alexandros Aretopoulos (Trikala)
10 January 2018
19:30 EET

Panathinaikos	1–0	Lamia
Mounier 73'	Report

Leoforos Alexandras Stadium, Ampelokipoi
Referee: Giorgos Kominis (Thesprotia)

Lamia won 4–2 aggregate.

20 December 2017
19:30 EET

Panetolikos	0−4	AEK Athens
	Report	Christodoulopoulos 45' (pen.); Bakasetas 46'; Galo 65'; Giakoumakis 87'

Panetolikos Stadium, Agrinio
Referee: Praxitelis Zachariadis (Macedonia)
9 January 2018
19:30 EET

AEK Athens	1−0	Panetolikos
Lopes 65'	Report

Olympic Stadium, Marousi
Referee: Alexandros Tsamouris (Piraeus)

AEK Athens won 5–0 aggregate.

19 December 2017
19:30 EET

Trikala	1–5	PAOK
Panos 16'	Report	Matos 5', 58'; Biseswar 70'; Campos 80'; Shakhov 90+4'

Trikala Municipal Stadium, Trikala
Referee: Vasilis Fotias (Pella)
9 January 2018
17:15 EET

PAOK	2–1	Trikala
Prijović 78', 90+4' (pen.)	Report	Milosavljev 90+1'

Toumba Stadium, Thessaloniki
Referee: Fotis Fotiadis (Kastoria)

PAOK won 7–2 aggregate.

21 December 2017
15:00 EET

Panionios	2–0	OFI
Yeşil 77'; Hajsafi 78'	Report

Nea Smyrni Stadium, Nea Smyrni
Referee: Giorgos Lamprou (Euboea)
10 January 2018
15:00 EET

OFI	0–1	Panionios
	Report	Spiridonović 28'

Theodoros Vardinogiannis Stadium, Heraklion
Referee: Dimitris Styliaras (Aetoloacarnania)

Panionios won 3–0 aggregate.

21 December 2017
15:00 EET

AEL	3–0	Xanthi
Nazlidis 29', 32'; Leozinho 90'	Report

AEL FC Arena, Larissa
Referee: Ioannis Papadopoulos (Macedonia)
10 January 2018
17:15 EET

Xanthi	2–0	AEL
Meliopoulos 27'; Sylla 73'	Report

Xanthi FC Arena, Xanthi
Referee: Athanasios Sezos (Kilkis)

AEL won 3–2 aggregate.

== Quarter-finals ==
The draw for this round took place on 15 January 2018.

=== Summary ===
Team 1	Agg.	Team 2	1st leg	2nd leg
PAOK	5–1	Atromitos	2–0	3–1
Panionios	5–1	Lamia	1–0	4–1
Olympiacos	1–2	AEK Athens	0–0	1–2
PAS Giannina	3–5	AEL	1–2	2–3 (a.e.t.)

=== Matches ===
24 January 2018
21:45 EET

PAOK	2–0	Atromitos
Pelkas 18'; Shakhov 86'	Report

Toumba Stadium, Thessaloniki
Referee: Athanasios Tzilos (Larissa)
8 February 2018
19:30 EET

Atromitos	1–3	PAOK
Vasilakakis 54'	Report	Shakhov 30'; Cañas 68'; Koulouris 79'

Peristeri Stadium, Peristeri
Referee: Dimitris Styliaras (Aetoloacarnania)

PAOK won 5–1 on aggregate.

24 January 2018
17:15 EET

Panionios	1–0	Lamia
Masouras 69'	Report

Nea Smyrni Stadium, Nea Smyrni
Referee: Dimitrios Thanos (Grevena)
7 February 2018
21:45 EET

Lamia	1–4	Panionios
Anastasopoulos 40'	Report	Durmishaj 17', 31', 54'; Lamprou 90'

Lamia Municipal Stadium, Lamia
Referee: Anastasios Sidiropoulos (Dodecanese)

Panionios won 5–1 on aggregate.

24 January 2018
19:30 EET

Olympiacos	0–0	AEK Athens
	Report

Georgios Karaiskakis Stadium, Piraeus
Attendance: 30,000
Referee: Anastasios Sidiropoulos (Dodecanese)
7 February 2018
19:30 EET

AEK Athens	2–1	Olympiacos
Christodoulopoulos 57'; Araujo 73'	Report	Tachtsidis 83'

Olympic Stadium, Marousi
Attendance: 22,035
Referee: Georgios Kominis (Thesprotia)

AEK Athens won 2–1 on aggregate.

25 January 2018
19:30 EET

PAS Giannina	1–2	AEL
Conde 13'	Report	Masouras 28', 53'

Zosimades Stadium, Ioannina
Referee: Georgios Kominis (Thesprotia)
7 February 2018
17:15 EET

AEL	3–2 (a.e.t.)	PAS Giannina
Križman 11'; Masouras 99'; Fatjon 108' (pen.)	Report	Conde 22', 82'

AEL FC Arena, Larissa
Referee: Dimitrios Karantonis (Imathia)

AEL won 5–3 on aggregate.

== Semi-finals ==
The draw for this round took place on 12 February 2018.

=== Summary ===
Team 1	Agg.	Team 2	1st leg	2nd leg
Panionios	2–6	PAOK	1–3	1–3
AEL	2–2 (a)	AEK Athens	2–1	0–1

=== Matches ===
28 February 2018
19:30 EET

Panionios	1–3	PAOK
Korbos 85'	Report (in Greek)	Maurício 24'; Prijović 34'; Biseswar 73'

Nea Smyrni Stadium, Nea Smyrni
Referee: Emmanouil Skoulas (Thessaly)
17 April 2018
19:00 EEST

PAOK	3–1	Panionios
Koulouris 21'; Pelkas 68'; Prijović 80' (pen.)	Report (in Greek)	Masouras 40'

Toumba Stadium, Thessaloniki
Referee: Athanasios Sezos (Kilkis)

PAOK won 6–2 on aggregate.

1 March 2018
19:30 EET

AEL	2–1	AEK Athens
Nazlidis 57'; Križman 92'	Report (in Greek)	Masoud 51'

AEL FC Arena, Larissa
Referee: Praxitelis Zachariadis (Macedonia)
18 April 2018
19:30 EEST

AEK Athens	1–0	AEL
Christodoulopoulos 90+4'	Report (in Greek)

Olympic Stadium, Marousi
Referee: Anastasios Papapetrou (Athens)

AEK Athens won on away goals.

== Final ==
12 May 2018
20:30 EEST

AEK Athens	0–2	PAOK
	Report	Vieirinha 65'; Pelkas 90+2'

Olympic Stadium, Marousi
Attendance: 35,545
Referee: David Fernández Borbalán (Spain)

== Top scorers ==
Rank	Player	Club	Goals
1	(Spain) Pedro Conde	PAS Giannina	6
1	(Serbia) Aleksandar Prijović	PAOK	6
1	(Greece) Lazaros Christodoulopoulos	AEK Athens	6
4	(Ukraine) Yevhen Shakhov	PAOK	5
5	(Greece) Dimitrios Pelkas	PAOK	4
6	(Nigeria) Emmanuel Emenike	Olympiacos	3
6	(Greece) Panagiotis Triadis	Xanthi	3
6	(Sweden) Guillermo Molins	Panathinaikos	3
6	(Egypt) Amr Warda	Atromitos	3
6	(Montenegro) Uroš Đurđević	Olympiacos	3
6	(Greece) Giannis Masouras	AEL	3
6	(Croatia) Sandi Križman	AEL	3
6	(Greece) Thomas Nazlidis	AEL	3
6	(Greece) Georgios Masouras	Olympiacos	3
