= Gianniotis =

Gianniotis is a surname. Notable people with the surname include:

- Andreas Gianniotis
- Spyridon Gianniotis
- Ilias Gianniotis
- Dimitrios Gianniotis
