= Adam Tzanetopoulos =

Greek footballer

Personal information
- Date of birth: 10 February 1995 (age 31)
- Place of birth: Volos, Greece
- Height: 1.93 m (6 ft 4 in)
- Position: Centre-back

Team information
- Current team: Niki Volos
- Number: 55

Youth career
- –2009: Niki Volos
- 2009–2012: Olympiacos
- 2012–2013: Niki Volos

Senior career*
Years	Team	Apps	(Gls)
2012–2013	Niki Volos	0	(0)
2013–2018	AEK Athens	30	(0)
2016–2017	→ Iraklis (loan)	17	(0)
2018–2019	Apollon Smyrnis	10	(0)
2019–2024	Lamia	112	(2)
2024–2025	Al Dhafra	24	(1)
2025–	Niki Volos	21	(2)

International career^{‡}
2015–2016	Greece U21	10	(0)
2015	Greece	1	(0)
- * Club domestic league appearances and goals as of 21:00, 24 January 2026 (UTC) ‡ National team caps and goals as of 11 October 2015

Adam Tzanetopoulos (Greek: Άνταμ Τζανετόπουλος; born 10 February 1995) is a Greek professional footballer who plays as a centre-back for Super League 2 club Niki Volos.

== Club career ==
Born in Volos, Tzanetopoulos joined the Olympiacos academies at the age of 15. Three years later, he left Olympiacos, signing a contract with Niki Volos. His distinguished playing along with his ability in defensive game attracts the interest of both Nikos Liberopoulos and Traianos Dellas.

=== AEK Athens ===
Tzanetopoulos joined AEK Athens in 2013. Tzanetopoulos scored his first professional goal against Atromitos in the Cup in a 3–0 home victory. Tzanetopoulos in his first year with the club played in seven Football League 2 games and also scored in the 2–0 win over A.E. Kifisia, which meant that AEK had mathematically secured their promotion to the Football League.

The summer friendly international with the winners of last year's UEFA Europa League, Sevilla was a step forward in his career. The Andalusians by having the opportunity to check him realized that he is a player with tremendous perspective, therefore they submitted a proposal to AEK Athens on a long-year loan, with a purchase option of €1.5 million, but was rejected. On 4 February 2016, AEK Athens officially announced that the 21-year-old international central defender Tzanetopoulos renewed his contract, for an undisclosed fee, with the club until the summer of 2020, despite the fact that is not among the first priorities of AEK Athens manager Gus Poyet. "I am very happy for that because it was my desire to stay here, now the only thing in my mind is working hard in order to thank the club's officials for having faith in my ability", said Tzanetopoulos, whose previous contract with AEK was expiring at the end of next season. On 28 February 2016, in a derby against rivals Panathinaikos returned to the squad after almost three months as a late substitute helping his club to celebrate a 1–0 home win.

As of December 2016, it seemed that international central defender/defensive midfielder of AEK Athens would continue his career at Cyprus, on loan since January. The 21-year-old player has performed in only one official match during 2016–17 season, the one against Anagennisi Karditsa for the Cup. Eventually, on 9 January 2017, he was loaned to Iraklis until the end of the season. He finished the second half of the season with 17 appearances and as a result of his solid performances he returned to AEK Athens.

On 26 October 2017, Tzanetopoulos scored after almost 3 years in a comfortable 7–0 Cup away win against Apollon Larissa.

=== Apollon Smyrnis ===
On 5 July 2018 Tzanetopoulos joined Apollon Smyrnis on a three-year deal.

=== Lamia ===
On 29 January 2019, he signed a contract with Lamia on a free transfer, but he didn't play until the end of 2018–19 season.

On 28 May 2021, he agreed to extend his contract, until the summer of 2024.

== International career ==
On 5 October 2015, the interim national coach Kostas Tsanas called Tzanetopoulos to replace Kyriakos Papadopoulos, who was injured in Bayer Leverkusen Bundesliga's game against Augsburg, for the games against Northern Ireland and Hungary, for the EURO 2016 qualifiers. This was the first call of the young AEK Athens centre-back.

Tzanetopoulos make his debut as a substitute, on 11 October 2015, in a dramatic 4–3 win game over Hungary for Euro 2016 qualifiers. It was the first and only win of Greece in the qualification round finishing last in the Group F qualifying campaign.

== Career statistics ==
=== Club ===
As of 1 April 2026

Club	Season	League			Cup		Continental		Other		Total	
Club	Season	Division	Apps	Goals	Apps	Goals	Apps	Goals	Apps	Goals	Apps	Goals
AEK Athens	2013–14	Gamma Ethniki	7	1	0	0	—		—		7	1
AEK Athens	2014–15	Super League Greece 2	16	0	5	1	—		—		21	1
AEK Athens	2015–16	Super League Greece	13	0	4	0	—		—		17	0
AEK Athens	2016–17	Super League Greece	0	0	2	0	0	0	—		2	0
AEK Athens	2017–18	Super League Greece	1	0	4	2	2 (Note: Appearances in UEFA Europa League)	0	—		7	2
AEK Athens	Total		37	1	15	3	2	0	—		54	4
Iraklis (loan)	2016–17	Super League Greece	17	0	—		—		—		17	0
Apollon Smyrnis	2018–19	Super League Greece	10	0	3	1	—		—		13	1
Lamia	2018–19	Super League Greece	0	0	0	0	—		—		0	0
Lamia	2019–20	Super League Greece	8	0	6	0	—		—		14	0
Lamia	2020–21	Super League Greece	25	1	0	0	—		—		25	1
Lamia	2021–22	Super League Greece	23	0	6	1	—		—		29	1
Lamia	2022–23	Super League Greece	18	0	3	0	—		—		21	0
Lamia	2023–24	Super League Greece	28	0	0	0	—		—		28	0
Lamia	Total		102	1	15	1	0	0	0	0	117	2
Al Dhafra	2024–25	UAE First Division League	24	1	2	0	—		—		26	1
Niki Volos	2025–26	Super League Greece 2	21	2	0	0	—		—		21	2
Career total			211	5	35	5	2	0	0	0	248	10

=== International ===
As of 11 October 2015

National team	Year	Apps	Goals
Greece
Greece	2015	1	0
Total		1	0

== Honours ==
AEK Athens

- Super League: 2017–18
- Football League: 2014–15 (South Group)
- Football League 2: 2013–14 (6th Group)
- Greek Cup: 2015–16

Al Dhafra

- UAE First Division League: 2024-25
