= Michalis Bakakis =

Greek footballer (born 1991)

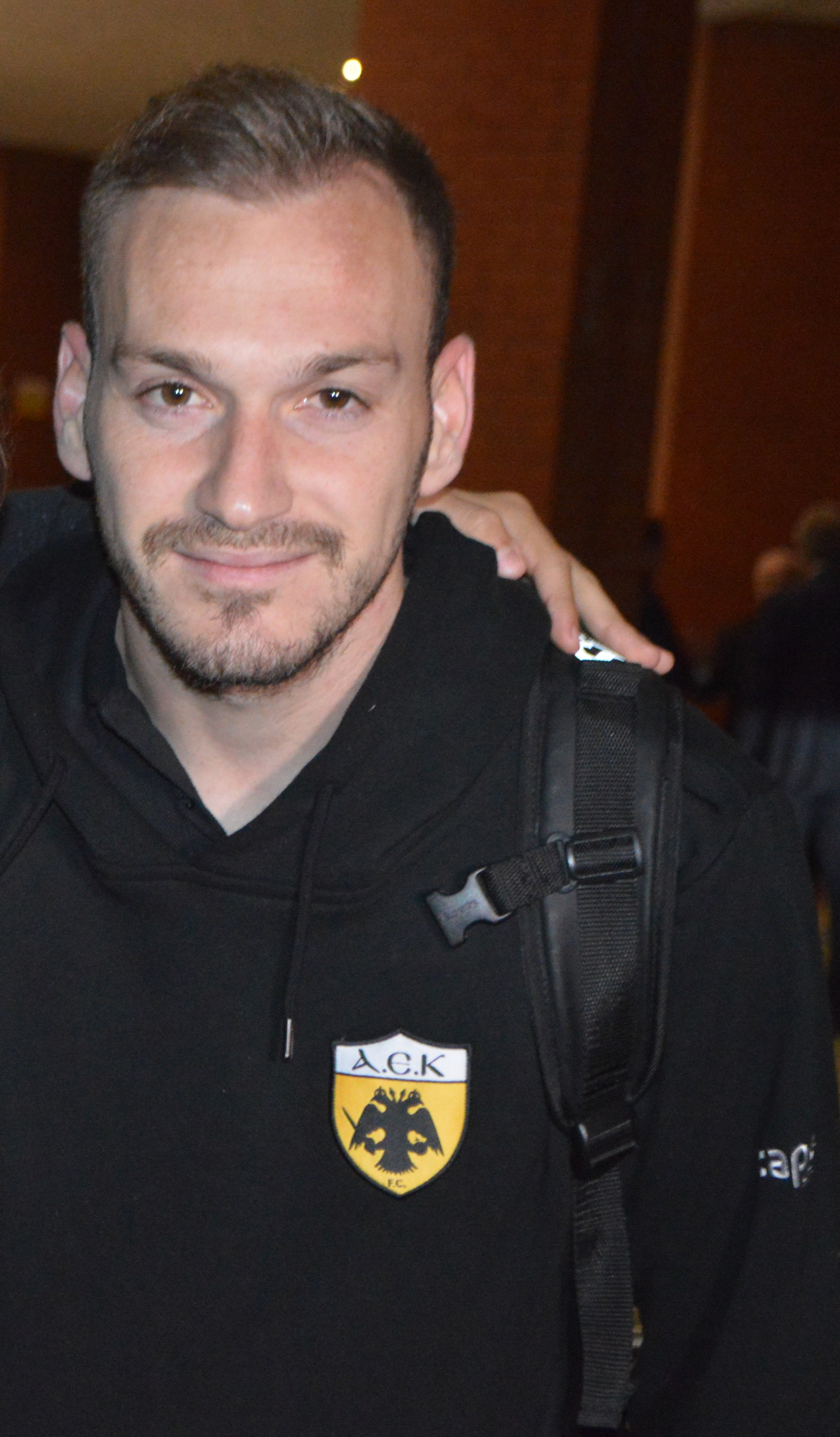
- Bakakis with AEK Athens in 2018

Personal information
- Full name: Michail Bakakis
- Date of birth: 18 March 1991 (age 35)
- Place of birth: Agrinio, Greece
- Height: 1.75 m (5 ft 9 in)
- Position: Defender

Youth career
- 2007–2008: Panetolikos

Senior career*
Years	Team	Apps	(Gls)
2008–2011	Panetolikos	14	(0)
2011–2012	AO Chania	19	(0)
2012–2014	Panetolikos	66	(2)
2014–2022	AEK Athens	130	(2)
2021	AEK Athens B	2	(0)
2022–2025	Panetolikos	36	(2)

International career^{‡}
2010	Greece U19	3	(0)
2014–2021	Greece	20	(0)
- * Club domestic league appearances and goals as of 18 June 2025 ‡ National team caps and goals as of 22:00, 6 June 2021 (UTC)

Michalis Bakakis (Greek: Μιχάλης Μπακάκης; born 18 March 1991) is a Greek former international footballer who played as a defender.

== Club career ==
=== Early career ===
Born on 18 March 1991 in Agrinio, Bakakis began his career with local side Panetolikos. His first professional appearance was a win match against Fokikos on 21 January 2009. In the summer of 2011 he transferred to AO Chania. He returned to Panetolikos on 31 July 2012.

=== AEK Athens ===
On 15 April 2014, AEK Athens announced the agreement with the player for a 4-year contract. In February 2015, shortly before the crucial match against Olympiacos for the Cup, Bakakis stated that "We must be determined, passionate and concentrated. First of all we want to win the Football League title, so that AEK will return where they belong. But we are interested in the Greek Cup as well. It would be a dream come true if we manage to win both." On 20 May 2015, in a home match against Olympiacos Volos he suffered a cruciate rupture, which left him out of the pitch for 6 months.

His contract had been due to expire in the summer of 2017, but that was extended to 2019 by his club. Bakakis always had the desire to remain at AEK Athens and he was more than happy to commit his future to the club for the next two years. On 12 April 2017, Bakakis agreed to a further contract extension until the summer of 2020.

At the start of the 2017–18 season he switched his number from 27 to 2. On 25 July 2017, he made his debut in the Champions League in a 2–0 home loss against CSKA Moscow for the third qualifying round. On 23 February 2018, Bakakis was included in Europa League's Team of the Week for his performance in a 0–0 away draw against Dynamo Kyiv. The 27-year-old defender has been in excellent form for experienced Spanish manager Manolo Jimenez's team during 2017–18 season, playing mainly as central or left defender even if his natural position is at the right place of the defensive line.

On 29 August 2018, Bakakis agreed to a contract extension with AEK, until the summer of 2023. On 10 November 2019, the 28-year-old Greek international scored only the third goal of his AEK career, and his first strike in four-and-a-half years when he let fly from the edge of the box with a powerful shot which left Sokratis Dioudis no chance, in a devastating 3–2 away loss against Panathinaikos.

On 31 March 2021, AEK were deprived of the services of Bakakis, as the Greek back was injured in an international match against Georgia, as it was confirmed the assessment that the tendon in his right leg was affected. Eventually, the international back has suffered a partial tendon rupture and was out of action for about two weeks. It was the third injury of Bakakis in 2021.

On the beginning of November 2021, Bakakis was put at the disposal of the coach of AEK Athens B, Sokratis Ofrydopoulos, in order to find a maintain his form, since we was out of the plans of Vladan Milojević, but also to help the youngsters of the second team. On 29 July 2021, the match that AEK excluded from the UEFA Conference League, was probably the last appearance until today of Bakakis with the jersey of the club. Since the arrival of new coach Argirios Giannikis, the international defender was informed that he was no longer considered as a member of the club, and that he can look for the next stage of his career.

== International career ==
He has represented Greece at U-19 level. Bakakis' debut with the Greece came against Serbia, replacing Vasilis Torosidis in November 2014.

== Career statistics ==
=== Club ===
As of 20 June 2025

Club	Season	League			Cup		Continental		Other		Total	
Club	Season	Division	Apps	Goals	Apps	Goals	Apps	Goals	Apps	Goals	Apps	Goals
Panetolikos	2009–10	Football League	13	0	2	0	—		—		15	0
Panetolikos	2010–11	Football League	1	0	1	0	—		—		2	0
Panetolikos	2012–13	Football League	36	2	1	0	—		—		37	2
Panetolikos	2013–14	Super League Greece	30	0	3	0	—		—		33	0
Panetolikos	Total		80	2	7	0	—		—		87	2
Chania	2011–12	Football League 2	19	0	1	0	—		—		20	0
AEK Athens	2014–15	Football League	20	1	8	1	—		—		28	2
AEK Athens	2015–16	Super League Greece	7	0	7	0	—		—		14	0
AEK Athens	2016–17	Super League Greece	11	0	4	0	0	0	—		15	0
AEK Athens	2017–18	Super League Greece	25	0	6	0	12	0	—		43	0
AEK Athens	2018–19	Super League Greece	25	0	7	0	10	0	—		42	0
AEK Athens	2019–20	Super League Greece	27	1	6	0	1	0	—		34	1
AEK Athens	2020–21	Super League Greece	15	0	0	0	3	0	—		18	0
AEK Athens	2021–22	Super League Greece	0	0	0	0	2	0	—		2	0
AEK Athens	Total		130	2	38	1	28	0	—		196	3
AEK Athens B	2021–22	Super League Greece 2	2	0	—		—		—		2	0
Panetolikos	2022–23	Super League Greece	5	0	1	0	—		—		6	0
Panetolikos	2023–24	Super League Greece	6	0	3	0	—		—		9	0
Panetolikos	2024–25	Super League Greece	25	0	0	0	—		—		25	0
Panetolikos	Total		36	0	4	0	—		—		40	0
Career total			267	4	50	1	28	0	0	0	345	5

==== Notes ====
A. Includes appearances in the UEFA Champions League and UEFA Europa League.
B. Includes appearances in the Super League Greece play-offs.

=== International ===
Appearances and goals by national team and year
National team	Year	Apps	Goals
Greece
Greece	2014	1	0
Greece	2015	0	0
Greece	2018	6	0
Greece	2019	8	0
Greece	2020	2	0
Greece	2021	3	0
Total		20	0

== Honours ==
AEK Athens

- Super League Greece: 2017–18
- Super League Greece 2: 2014–15 (South Group)
- Greek Cup: 2015–16
