= Christos Koukolis =

Greek footballer

Personal information
- Date of birth: 26 April 1990 (age 36)
- Place of birth: Veria, Greece
- Height: 1.84 m (6 ft 0 in)
- Position: Centre-back

Team information
- Current team: Pierikos
- Number: 18

Youth career
- Veria

Senior career*
Years	Team	Apps	(Gls)
2009–2011	Veria		
2011–2015	Ethnikos Gazorou	81	(0)
2015–2016	Panserraikos	13	(0)
2016–2017	Agrotikos Asteras	26	(4)
2017–2018	Lamia	20	(0)
2018–2019	Iraklis	8	(0)
2019–2021	Doxa Drama	37	(0)
2021–2022	Panserraikos	5	(0)
2022–	Pierikos	15	(1)
- * Club domestic league appearances and goals as of 20 April 2022

Christos Koukolis (Greek: Χρήστος Κουκόλης; born 26 April 1990) is a Greek professional footballer who plays as a centre-back for Super League 2 club Pierikos.
