= Christos Antoniou =

Greek footballer (born 1998)

Personal information
- Date of birth: 14 February 1998 (age 28)
- Place of birth: Athens, Greece
- Height: 1.70 m (5 ft 7 in)
- Position: Forward

Team information
- Current team: A.E. Mykonos

Youth career
- 2015–2017: AEK Athens

Senior career*
Years	Team	Apps	(Gls)
2017–2019	AEK Athens	0	(0)
2018–2019	→ Ergotelis (loan)	1	(0)
2019	→ Diagoras (loan)		
2019–2020	Aiolikos		
2020	Alki Oroklini		
2020–2021	Digenis Morphou		
2021–2023	Almyros Gaziou		
2023–2025	Ethnikos Piraeus		
2025–2026	Aris Petroupolis		
2026–	A.E. Mykonos		
- * Club domestic league appearances and goals as of 14 July 2025

Christos Antoniou (Greek: Χρήστος Αντωνίου; born 14 February 1998) is a Greek professional footballer who plays as a forward for Gamma Ethniki club A.E. Mykonos.

== Club career ==
=== AEK Athens ===
Antoniou started playing football at the academies of AEK Athens. On 21 August 2017, he signed a professional contract and was promoted to the men's team. On 1 September 2017 Antoniou was included in the list of players for the group stage of the UEFA Europa League, where AEK managed to qualify finishing in the second place in their group, while they also were undefeated. He remained in the European list of the club for the round of 32 against Dynamo Kyiv, where on 22 February 2018 he was at the bench in the second leg of the draw. Despite not managing to make any official appearances with the club, he was part of the squad that won the Championship in 2018.

On 25 July 2018, Antoniou moved to Super League 2 club, Ergotelis, as on loan. He made his debut for the Greek Cup on 16 September 2018 in the away 0–3 win against Ermis Amyntaio. Nevertheless, he didn't manage to get enough playing time and his loan was terminated on 7 January 2019.

On 1 February 2019, Antoniou was loaned to Diagoras, where he played at Gamma Ethniki for the rest of the season.

=== Aiolikos ===
On 18 September 2019, he was transferred to the Gamma Ethniki side, Aiolikos.

=== Cyprus ===
In 2020, Antoniou moved to Cyprus and signed for the second division club, Alki Oroklini for a short period, before moving to Digenis Morphou for the rest of the season.

=== Almyros Gaziou ===
On 29 September 2021, Antoniou returned to Greece and moved to Almyros Gaziou, where he spent 1 1/2 seasons playing in the third division. During his spell at the club he competed in 4 Cup matches. On 9 December 2022 he left the club.

=== Ethnikos Piraeus ===
On 10 January 2023, Antoniou signed for another third division club, Ethnikos Piraeus, where he played for another 1 1/2 seasons. He scored his first goal for the Cup on 30 August 2023, opening the score with a penalty kick in a 5–0 home win against P.A.O. Krousonas. On 3 September he also played in a 0–2 win over Ialysos in the next round. On 13 September he scored the only goal in the Cup match against Panthrakikos, but the match was abandonde and Ethnikos were awarded the match. He started the match of the following round against Giouchtas, where they were eliminated by a 1–2 home defeat.

In his second season at the club he compteted in all 4 Cup matches of Ethnikos, where they reached the fourth round. On 22 June 2025 after the season was over he was released from the club.

=== Aris Petroupolis ===
On 14 July 2025, Antoniou joined Aris Petroupolis, where he played for a season.

=== A.E. Mykonos ===
On 1 July 2026, he signed for A.E. Mykonos.

== Honours ==
AEK Athens

- Super League Greece: 2017–18
