= Thomas Papadopoulos =

Greek footballer

Personal information
- Date of birth: 24 March 1996 (age 30)
- Place of birth: Veria, Greece
- Height: 1.74 m (5 ft 9 in)
- Position: Winger

Youth career
- Veria

Senior career*
Years	Team	Apps	(Gls)
2016–2019	Aiginiakos	62	(8)
2019–2020	Platanias	9	(0)
- * Club domestic league appearances and goals as of 8 August 2020

Thomas Papadopoulos (Greek: Θωμάς Παπαδόπουλος; born 24 March 1996) is a Greek professional footballer who plays as a winger.
