= Thanasis Pantos =

Greek footballer

Personal information
- Full name: Athanasios Pantos
- Date of birth: 9 October 1998 (age 28)
- Place of birth: Athens, Greece
- Height: 1.90 m (6 ft 3 in)
- Position: Goalkeeper

Team information
- Current team: Athens Kallithea
- Number: 1

Youth career
- 2004–2006: Thyella Rafina
- 2006–2017: AEK Athens

Senior career*
| Years | Team | Apps | (Gls) |
| 2017–2020 | AEK Athens | 0 | (0) |
| 2017 | → Acharnaikos (loan) | 2 | (0) |
| 2018–2019 | → Sparti (loan) | 12 | (0) |
| 2019–2020 | → Kalamata (loan) | 3 | (0) |
| 2020 | → Ethnikos Piraeus (loan) | 3 | (0) |
| 2020– | Athens Kallithea | 21 | (0) |
- * Club domestic league appearances and goals as of 25 May 2024

Thanasis Pantos (Greek: Θανάσης Πάντος; born 9 October 1998) is a Greek professional footballer who plays as a goalkeeper for Super League club Athens Kallithea.

== Career ==
Born in Athens, Pantos passed through the academy of AEK Athens and gained his first professional experience through loan spells to the second and third tiers with Acharnaikos, Sparti, Kalamata, and Ethnikos Piraeus.

In July 2020, Pantos signed for Athens Kallithea.

== Honours ==
AEK Athens

- Super League: 2017–18
