= Nikos Anastasopoulos =

Greek footballer

Personal information
- Full name: Nikolaos Anastasopoulos
- Date of birth: 1 February 1993 (age 33)
- Place of birth: Sparta, Greece
- Height: 1.86 m (6 ft 1 in)
- Position: Defensive midfielder

Youth career
- –2012: Asteras Tripolis

Senior career*
Years	Team	Apps	(Gls)
2012–2014	Asteras Tripolis	0	(0)
2013–2014	→ Niki Volos (loan)	9	(0)
2014–2015	Panachaiki	24	(1)
2015–2017	AEL	42	(3)
2017–2018	Lamia	17	(0)
2018	Kerkyra	0	(0)
2018–2019	Panserraikos	8	(1)
2019–2020	Asteras Vlachioti	18	(0)
2021–2022	Kalamata	42	(3)
2023	Apollon Smyrnis	14	(0)
2023	Erani Filiatra	0	(0)
2023–2024	PAS Korinthos		
2024–2025	Kalamata	6	(0)
2025–2026	Zakynthos		
2026	Egaleo		
- * Club domestic league appearances and goals as of 15 June 2025

Nikolaos Anastasopoulos (Greek: Νικόλαος Αναστασόπουλος; born 1 February 1993) is a Greek professional footballer who plays as a defensive midfielder.

== Career ==
Anastasopoulos began his career in the youth teams of Asteras Tripolis before making his senior debut while on loan at Niki Volos. The next season, he moved to Panachaiki, where he scored one goal in 24 appearances in the Football League Greece. On 23 July 2015, Anastasopoulos moved to AEL and signed a three-year contract. He made his Super League Greece debut on 12 September 2016 against Iraklis.
