= Salimo Sylla =

French footballer (born 1994)

Personal information
- Date of birth: 25 January 1994 (age 32)
- Place of birth: Châlons-en-Champagne, France
- Height: 1.70 m (5 ft 7 in)
- Position: Defender

Team information
- Current team: Kalamata
- Number: 27

Senior career*
Years	Team	Apps	(Gls)
2012–2015	Troyes B	74	(2)
2014–2015	Troyes	5	(0)
2015	Auxerre B	3	(0)
2015–2016	Auxerre	27	(0)
2016–2017	Sint-Truiden	7	(0)
2017–2019	Xanthi	45	(1)
2019–2020	Virton	16	(0)
2022–2023	Versailles	12	(0)
2023–2024	Chania	26	(0)
2024–2025	A.E. Kifisia	22	(0)
2025–	Kalamata	7	(0)
- * Club domestic league appearances and goals as of 25 January 2026

Salimo Sylla (born 25 January 1994) is a French professional footballer who plays as a defender for Greek Super League 2 club Kalamata.

== Career ==
In January 2022, Sylla returned to France by signing for Versailles in the Championnat National 2.

== Honours ==
Versailles

- Championnat National 2: 2021–22
