= Dimitrios Melikiotis =

Greek footballer

Personal information
- Full name: Dimitrios Melikiotis
- Date of birth: 10 July 1996 (age 30)
- Place of birth: Veria, Greece
- Height: 1.76 m (5 ft 9 1/2 in)
- Position: Forward

Team information
- Current team: Keravnos Angelochoriou

Youth career
- –2014: Veria

Senior career*
| Years | Team | Apps | (Gls) |
| 2014–2016 | Veria | 12 | (1) |
| 2017–2018 | AEK Athens | 0 | (0) |
| 2017–2018 | → Kerkyra (loan) | 2 | (0) |
| 2018 | Volos | 9 | (1) |
| 2019–2020 | Veria | | |
| 2020 | Episkopi | 0 | (0) |
| 2021 | Iraklis | 7 | (0) |
| 2021–2022 | Edessaikos | | |
| 2022– | Keravnos Angelochoriou | | |

International career^{‡}
| 2016–2017 | Greece U21 | 7 | (1) |
- * Club domestic league appearances and goals as of 18 August 2020 ‡ National team caps and goals as of 20 December 2017

Dimitrios Melikiotis (Greek: Δημήτριος Μεληκιώτης; born 10 July 1996) is a Greek professional footballer who plays as a forward for Gamma Ethniki club, Iraklis.

== Club career ==
=== Veria ===
Melikiotis signed his professional contract on 6 February 2014. So far he didn't make his official squad debut, though he was selected during 2013–14 season, three times as first team substitute. Despite his young age, he was selected by his current coach Georgios Georgiadis to join the team in there pre-season tour in Arnhem. He made his professional debut against PAS Giannina in a 2–0 away defeat.

=== AEK Athens ===
On 2 January 2017, Melikiotis signed a 4 1/2-year contract with AEK Athens. On 25 January 2017 he made his debut for AEK in the Greek Cup and provided an assist to Anastasios Bakasetas in what would prove to be the only goal in the 1–0 away win against Levadiakos.

==== Kerkyra (loan) ====
On 16 August 2017 Melikiotis joined Kerkyra on a season-long loan.

=== Volos ===
On 11 July 2018, he joined Volos on a three-year contract.

== International career ==
On 4 October 2016, Antonis Nikopolidis head coach of Greece national under-21 football team called up Melikiotis for the first time ever in his career to the national team for the games against Hungary and Israel.

== Honours ==
Veria

- Gamma Ethniki: 2018–19 (2nd Group)
- Imathia Cup: 2018–19
