= Manolis Patralis =

Greek football player

Personal information
- Full name: Emmanouil Patralis
- Date of birth: 6 February 1997 (age 29)
- Place of birth: Nea Raidestos, Greece
- Height: 1.74 m (5 ft 8 1/2 in)
- Position: Defensive midfielder

Team information
- Current team: Apollon Kalamaria

Youth career
- –2016: PAOK

Senior career*
Years	Team	Apps	(Gls)
2016–2019	PAOK	0	(0)
2016–2017	→ Aiginiakos (loan)	30	(3)
2017–2018	→ Platanias (loan)	19	(0)
2018–2019	→ Doxa Drama (loan)	25	(2)
2019–2021	Apollon Smyrnis	14	(2)
2021	AEL	0	(0)
2022–2023	Iraklis	47	(4)
2023	AEL	5	(0)
2024–2025	Iraklis	39	(0)
2025–	Apollon Kalamarias	0	(0)

International career^{‡}
2013–2014	Greece U17	7	(0)
2015	Greece U18	7	(0)
2015–2016	Greece U19	8	(0)
- * Club domestic league appearances and goals as of 25 June 2025 ‡ National team caps and goals as of 4 February 2017

Manolis Patralis (Greek: Μανώλης Πατράλης, born 6 February 1997) is a Greek professional footballer who plays as a defensive midfielder for Apollon Kalamaria of the Greek Third National Division.

== Career ==
On 1 July 2016 it was announced that Patralis signed a long year season contract with Aiginiakos, on loan from PAOK.

On 27 July 2017, he joined Super League Greece club Platanias on a season long-loan.

On 24 August 2018, he was loaned once again, this time to Doxa Drama.

On 16 July 2019, he joined Apollon Smyrnis on a free transfer.

On 8 July 2021, he joined AEL on a free transfer.

== Career statistics ==
As of 18 June 2025

Club	Season	League			Cup		Continental		Other		Total	
Club	Season	Division	Apps	Goals	Apps	Goals	Apps	Goals	Apps	Goals	Apps	Goals
PAOK	2015–16	Super League Greece	0	0	1	0	—		—		1	0
Aiginiakos (loan)	2016–17	Super League Greece 2	30	3	3	0	—		—		33	3
Platanias (loan)	2017–18	Super League Greece	19	0	3	1	—		—		22	1
Doxa Drama (loan)	2018–19	Super League Greece 2	25	2	1	0	—		—		26	2
Apollon Smyrnis	2019–20	Super League Greece 2	14	2	0	0	—		—		14	2
Apollon Smyrnis	2020–21	Super League Greece	0	0	0	0	—		—		0	0
Apollon Smyrnis	Total		14	2	0	0	—		—		14	2
AEL	2021–22	Super League Greece 2	0	0	2	0	—		—		0	0
Iraklis	2021–22	Super League Greece 2	22	3	0	0	—		—		22	3
Iraklis	2022–23	Super League Greece 2	26	1	1	0	—		—		27	1
Iraklis	Total		48	4	1	0	—		—		49	4
AEL	2023–24	Super League Greece 2	5	0	1	0	—		—		6	0
Iraklis	2023–24	Super League Greece 2	20	0	0	0	—		—		20	0
Iraklis	2024–25	Super League Greece 2	19	0	1	0	—		—		20	0
Iraklis	Total		39	0	1	0	—		—		40	0
Career total			180	11	13	1	0	0	0	0	193	12
