= Ilias Gianniotis =

Greek footballer

Personal information
- Full name: Ilias Gianniotis
- Date of birth: 5 April 1997 (age 29)
- Place of birth: Greece
- Height: 1.75 m (5 ft 9 in)
- Position: Winger

Team information
- Current team: Ialysos

Youth career
- 2014–2016: Panetolikos

Senior career*
Years	Team	Apps	(Gls)
2016–2020	Panetolikos	11	(0)
2020–	Ialysos	0	(0)
- * Club domestic league appearances and goals as of 14:16, 3 July 2019 (UTC)

Ilias Gianniotis (Greek: Ηλίας Γιαννιώτης; born 5 April 1997) is a Greek professional footballer who plays as a winger for Ialysos.

== Club career ==
=== Panetolikos ===
Gianniotis joined the youth club of Panetolikos in 2014. He signed his first professional contract in July 2016.

He made his Super League debut on 18 March 2017 coming on in the 58th minute in a match against AEL.

== Career statistics ==
=== Club ===
As of 3 December 2019

Club	Season	League			Cup		Continental		Other		Total	
Club	Season	Division	Apps	Goals	Apps	Goals	Apps	Goals	Apps	Goals	Apps	Goals
Panetolikos	2016–17	Super League Greece	2	0	2	0	—		—		4	0
Panetolikos	2017–18	Super League Greece	7	0	1	0	—		—		8	0
Panetolikos	2018–19	Super League Greece	1	0	1	0	—		—		3	0
Panetolikos	2019–20	Super League Greece	0	0	1	0	—		—		1	0
Panetolikos	Total		11	0	5	0	0	0	—		16	0
Career total			11	0	5	0	0	0	0	0	16	0
