= 2016–17 AEK Athens F.C. season =

AEK Athens
2016–17 season
- Chairman: Evangelos Aslanidis
- Manager: Temur Ketsbaia (until 18 October); Jose Morais (until 18 January); Manolo Jiménez
- Stadium: Athens Olympic Stadium
- Super League: 2nd (After play-offs); 4th (Regular Season)
- Greek Cup: Runners-up
- UEFA Europa League: Third qualifying round
- Top goalscorer: League: Tomáš Pekhart (9); All: Tomáš Pekhart (12)
- Highest home attendance: 33,512 (vs Olympiacos) (26 April 2017)
- Lowest home attendance: 2,500 (vs Kerkyra) (25 October 2016)
- Average home league attendance: 8,112
- Biggest win: AEK Athens 6–0 Veria; AEK Athens 6–0 Levadiakos
- Biggest defeat: Olympiacos 3–0 AEK Athens
Home colours	Away colours	Third colours

The 2016–17 season was the 93rd season in the existence of AEK Athens F.C. and the 56th competitive season and second consecutive in the top flight of Greek football. They competed in the Super League, the Greek Cup and the 2016–17 UEFA Europa League. The season began on 28 July 2016 and finished on 31 May 2017.

== Kits ==
Supplier: Nike
Sponsor(s): Pame stoixima
Features: LG Corp

Home	Away	Third

== Overview ==
In the summer of 2016, AEK after searching for a new manager they ended up with their former player, Temur Ketsbaia. The team made some great additions, such as the former Barcelona defender, Dmytro Chyhrynskyi, the former English international defender, Joleon Lescott, Patito Rodriguez and the international Portuguese striker, Hugo Almeida, while from the Greek market they were strengthened with the talented Vasilis Barkas and Anastasios Bakasetas. In the departures, those of Arzo, Cordero, Buonanotte and Djebbour stood out, while after the end of the European games Barbosa departed as well and was immediately replaced by the Greek international, Lazaros Christodoulopoulos.

Winning the Cup the previous season brought AEK back to European competitions and the third qualifying round of the Europa League, where they were unlucky to be drawn with French side Saint-Étienne. In the first leg at the Stade Geoffroy-Guichard, AEK fought the game to a 0–0 draw, while in the second leg at the Olympic Stadium, they conceded an early goal and they were eliminated, unable to do anything, since the French kept the score until the end by playing defensively.

AEK started the league well, but their defensive playing style, resulted in facing difficulties in scoring goals and dropped points in easy games. A 3–0 away defeat by Olympiacos, eventually led in the termination of the contract of Ketsbaia. In the attempt to find a manager with an offensive philosophy, the management proceeded in hiring the Portuguese José Morais, the former assistant of José Mourinho in several clubs, but without much experience as a manager. With Morais on the bench, the team presented themselves trying to play offensively, leaving their defense open and conceded goals with ease, not being able to impose themselves on their opponents. Thus, AEK were left far behind in the league, bringing bad results and Morais not being able to manage the situation, resigned from the team's bench in January. The removal of the Portuguese manager resulted in the return of Manolo Jimenez, who had won the 2011 Cup with AEK. With the club having already signed Astrit Ajdarevic and the Bosnian international defender Ognjen Vranjes, who came in to replace Lescott, who was released after disagreements with management over his treatment from an injury, were also strengthened with Vinicius Freitas and most importrantly with the loan of the great Argentinian striker, Sergio Araujo from Las Palmas. Under Jimenez, AEK managed to cover the lost ground, finishing the championship at the fourth place, with only 1 defeat in 3 months and thus advanced to the play-offs.

In the Cup , AEK after being the first to pass their group with their opponents Kerkyra, Anagennisi Karditsa and Lamia, easily eliminated Levadiakos for the round of 16 and then Platanias to advance to the semi-finals. There they met Olympiacos and in the first match at Karaiskakis Stadium they got a big win with 1–2. In the rematch at the Olympic Stadium, AEK having a qualifying score controlled the game, but a mistake by Mantalos in the midfield brought the ball into the possession of Romao who scored from an advantageous position. From there the game took off with the red and whites pressing in an episodic match that ended with Almeida playing as goalkeeper in stoppage time, after the suspension of Anestis and AEK eventually snatching a stressful qualification. AEK were in the final for a second consecutive season, where they faced PAOK, who didn't want the final to be held at the Olympic Stadium and made an issue of the venue of the final. In the end, a solution was found with the final taking place at Panthessaliko Stadium, which was turned into a construction site in order to ensure security measures, which however proved ineffective, as violent incidents between the ultras of the two clubs took place inside and outside the stadium. In the match, AEK, who faced a hostile referee, were left behind in the score, but managed to equalize immediately and towards the end of the match, PAOK regained their lead from an obvious offside position and made the final 2–1, claiming their first title after 14 years.

In the play-offs, AEK initially took their revenge for the lost Cup final by winning 0–1 at Toumba Stadium and after an impressive run managed to take the first place in the relevant standings that led to the Champions League, with a win in the final matchday and thus finishing second in the league.

== Management team ==
Position	Staff
Manager	(Spain) Manolo Jiménez
Assistant manager	(Spain) Jesús Calderón Malagón
Goalkeeping coach	(Greece) Kostas Kampolis
Fitness coach	(Spain) Sebastián López Bascón
Technical director	(Sweden) Daniel Majstorović
Executive director	(Bosnia and Herzegovina) Dušan Bajević
Academy manager	(Greece) Nikolaos Georgeas
U20 Manager	(Greece) Nikos Panagiotaras
U17 Manager	(Serbia) Ivan Nedeljković
Head of Scouting	(Greece) Michalis Kasapis
Scout	(Greece) Dimitrios Barbalias
Head of Medical	(Greece) Lakis Nikolaou

- Source: aekfc.gr

== Players ==
=== Squad information ===
NOTE: The players are the ones that have been announced by the AEK Athens' press release. No edits should be made unless a player arrival or exit is announced. Updated 31 May 2017, 23:59 UTC+3.

No.	Player	Nat.	Position(s)	Date of birth (Age)	Signed	Previous club	Transfer fee	Contract until
Goalkeepers
1	Vasilis Barkas	(Greece) (Netherlands)	GK	30 May 1994 (aged 23)	2016	(Greece) Atromitos	€600,000	2019
16	Ilias Vouras	(Greece)	GK	20 February 1988 (aged 29)	2013	(Greece) Niki Volos	Free	2017
22	Giannis Anestis	(Greece)	GK	9 March 1991 (aged 26)	2014	(Greece) Panionios	Free	2018
87	Giannis Papadopoulos	(Greece)	GK	21 September 1998 (aged 18)	2016	(Greece) AEK Athens U20	—	2020
Defenders
4	Ognjen Vranješ	(Bosnia and Herzegovina) (Serbia)	CB / RB	24 October 1989 (aged 27)	2016	(Russia) Tom Tomsk	Free	2019
5	Vasilios Lampropoulos	(Greece)	CB / RB	31 March 1990 (aged 27)	2016	(Greece) Panionios	Free	2019
12	Rodrigo Galo	(Brazil)	RB / RM / RW / LB	19 September 1986 (aged 30)	2015	(Portugal) Paços de Ferreira	Free	2019
17	Vinícius Freitas	(Brazil) (Portugal)	LB / LM / LW	7 March 1993 (aged 24)	2017	(Italy) Lazio	Free	2019
19	Dmytro Chyhrynskyi	(Ukraine)	CB	7 November 1986 (aged 30)	2016	(Ukraine) Dnipro	Free	2018
23	Dídac Vilà	(Spain)	LB / LM	9 June 1989 (aged 28)	2015	(Italy) Milan	Free	2018
24	Konstantinos Manolas	(Greece)	LB / CB / DM	26 March 1993 (aged 24)	2016	(Greece) Levadiakos	€50,000	2019
26	Dimitrios Kolovetsios (Vice-captain 3)	(Greece)	CB / RB	16 October 1991 (aged 25)	2014	(Greece) PAS Giannina	€250,000	2017
27	Michalis Bakakis	(Greece)	RB / LB / CB / RM	18 March 1991 (aged 26)	2014	(Greece) Panetolikos	€250,000	2019
33	Georgios Giannoutsos	(Greece)	LB / CB / DM	16 July 1998 (aged 18)	2016	(Greece) AEK Athens U20	—	2020
—	Alkis Markopouliotis	(Greece)	CB	13 August 1996 (aged 20)	2015	(Greece) AEK Athens U20	—	2019
Midfielders
6	Astrit Ajdarević	(Sweden) (Albania)	CM / AM / DM / ST	17 April 1990 (aged 27)	2016	(Sweden) Örebro	Free	2019
8	André Simões	(Portugal)	DM / CM	16 December 1989 (aged 27)	2015	(Portugal) Moreirense	Free	2019
18	Jakob Johansson (Vice-captain 2)	(Sweden)	DM / CM / CB	21 January 1990 (aged 27)	2014	(Sweden) Göteborg	Free	2018
20	Petros Mantalos (Captain)	(Greece)	AM / LM / CM / LW / SS / RM / RW	31 August 1991 (aged 25)	2014	(Greece) Xanthi	€500,000	2019
25	Konstantinos Galanopoulos	(Greece)	CM / DM	28 December 1997 (aged 19)	2015	(Greece) AEK Athens U20	—	2021
30	Ilias Tselios	(Greece)	CM / AM / DM / RM	6 October 1997 (aged 19)	2016	(Greece) AEK Athens U20	—	2020
Forwards
7	Lazaros Christodoulopoulos	(Greece)	RW / LW / RM / LM / SS / AM / CM	19 December 1986 (aged 30)	2016	(Italy) Hellas Verona	Free	2018
9	Hugo Almeida	(Portugal)	ST	23 May 1984 (aged 33)	2016	(Germany) Hannover 96	Free	2018
10	Ronald Vargas	(Venezuela)	SS / AM / ST / LW / RM / LM	18 July 1986 (aged 30)	2015	(Turkey) Balıkesirspor	Free	2017
11	Sergio Araujo	(Argentina)	ST / SS / LW / RW	28 January 1992 (aged 25)	2017	(Spain) Las Palmas	€200,000	2017
14	Tomáš Pekhart	(Czech Republic)	ST	26 May 1989 (aged 28)	2016	(Germany) Ingolstadt 04	Free	2017
21	Christos Aravidis (Vice-captain)	(Greece)	SS / ST / RW / LW / RM / LM	13 March 1987 (aged 30)	2014	(Greece) Panionios	Free	2017
28	Anastasios Bakasetas	(Greece)	SS / AM / ST / RW / LW / RM / LM	28 June 1993 (aged 24)	2016	(Greece) Panionios	€300,000	2019
29	Patito Rodríguez	(Argentina)	LW / LM / RW / RM / SS / AM	4 May 1990 (aged 27)	2016	(Brazil) Santos	Free	2018
31	Dimitrios Melikiotis	(Greece)	ST / SS / RW / LW	10 July 1996 (aged 20)	2017	(Greece) Veria	Free	2021
40	Andreas Vlachomitros	(Greece)	SS / ST / RW / LW	3 July 1997 (aged 19)	2015	(Greece) AEK Athens U20	—	2019
Left during Summer Transfer Window
—	Hélder Barbosa	(Portugal)	LW / LM / AM / RW / RM / SS	25 May 1987 (aged 30)	2014	(Portugal) Braga	Free	2017
Left during Winter Transfer Window
3	Juan Díaz	(Uruguay)	LB / LM / CB	28 October 1987 (aged 29)	2016	(Uruguay) Racing	Free	2018
55	Adam Tzanetopoulos	(Greece)	CB / DM / CM	10 February 1995 (aged 22)	2013	(Greece) Niki Volos	Free	2020
—	Joleon Lescott	(England)	CB / LB / DM	16 August 1982 (aged 34)	2016	(England) Aston Villa	Free	2018
—	Darko Zorić	(Montenegro)	SS / ST/ RW / LW / AM	12 September 1993 (aged 23)	2014	(Montenegro) Čelik Nikšić	€150,000	2017
—	Vangelis Platellas	(Greece)	RW / RM / LM / LW / SS / AM	1 December 1988 (aged 28)	2013	(Greece) Xanthi	Free	2016

== Transfers ==
=== In ===
==== Summer ====
No.	Pos.	Player	From	Fee	Date	Contract Until	Source
1	GK	(Greece) Vasilis Barkas	(Greece) Atromitos	€600,000	1 July 2016	30 June 2019	
3	DF	(Uruguay) Juan Díaz	(Uruguay) Racing	Free transfer	8 July 2016	30 June 2018	
6	DF	(England) Joleon Lescott	(England) Aston Villa	Free transfer	29 August 2016	30 June 2018	
7	FW	(Greece) Lazaros Christodoulopoulos	(Italy) Hellas Verona	Free transfer	27 August 2016	30 June 2018	
9	FW	(Portugal) Hugo Almeida	(Germany) Hannover 96	Free transfer	18 July 2016	30 June 2018	
17	FW	(Montenegro) Darko Zorić	(Serbia) Borac Čačak	Loan return	1 July 2016	30 June 2017	
19	DF	(Ukraine) Dmytro Chyhrynskyi	(Ukraine) Dnipro	Free transfer	1 July 2016	30 June 2018	
24	DF	(Greece) Konstantinos Manolas	(Greece) Levadiakos	€50,000	5 August 2016	30 June 2019	
28	FW	(Greece) Anastasios Bakasetas	(Greece) Panionios	€300,000	1 July 2016	30 June 2019	
29	FW	(Argentina) Patito Rodríguez	(Brazil) Santos	Free transfer	20 July 2016	30 June 2018	
30	MF	(Greece) Ilias Tselios	(Greece) AEK Athens U20	Promotion	21 July 2016	30 June 2020	
33	DF	(Greece) Georgios Giannoutsos	(Greece) AEK Athens U20	Promotion	25 August 2016	30 June 2020	
87	GK	(Greece) Giannis Papadopoulos	(Greece) AEK Athens U20	Promotion	29 September 2016	30 June 2020	
—	MF	(Greece) Kyriakos Andreopoulos	(Greece) Kerkyra	Loan return	1 July 2016	30 June 2018	
—	MF	(Senegal) Ablaye Faye	(Greece) Trikala	Loan return	1 July 2016	30 June 2017	
—	MF	(Greece) Dimitrios Anakoglou	(Greece) Veria	Loan return	1 July 2016	30 June 2017	
—	MF	(Greece) Vasilios Karvounidis	(Greece) AEK Athens U20	Promotion	29 September 2016	30 June 2019	

==== Winter ====
No.	Pos.	Player	From	Fee	Date	Contract Until	Source
4	DF	(Bosnia and Herzegovina) Ognjen Vranješ	(Russia) Tom Tomsk	Free transfer	23 December 2016	30 June 2019	
6	MF	(Sweden) Astrit Ajdarević	(Sweden) Örebro	Free transfer	13 December 2016	30 June 2019	
17	DF	(Brazil) Vinícius Freitas	(Italy) Lazio	Free transfer	31 January 2017	30 June 2019	
31	FW	(Greece) Dimitrios Melikiotis	(Greece) Veria	Free transfer	2 January 2017	30 June 2021	
40	FW	(Greece) Andreas Vlachomitros	(Serbia) Javor Ivanjica	Loan return	31 December 2016	30 June 2019	
—	MF	(Greece) Vasilios Karvounidis	(Greece) A.E. Kifisia	Loan return	11 January 2017	30 June 2020	

=== Out ===
==== Summer ====
No.	Pos.	Player	To	Fee	Date	Source
1	GK	(Venezuela) Alain Baroja	(Venezuela) Caracas	Loan return	1 July 2016	
2	DF	(Greece) Aristidis Soiledis	(Cyprus) Omonia	Free transfer	6 July 2016	
4	DF	(Spain) César Arzo	(Kazakhstan) Kairat	Free transfer	5 July 2016	
6	MF	(Spain) Miguel Cordero	(Spain) Gimnàstic	Contract termination	30 August 2016	
7	FW	(Portugal) Hélder Barbosa	(United Arab Emirates) Al Wasl	€750,000	24 August 2016	
12	GK	(Greece) Fotis Karagiolidis	Free agent	End of contract	1 July 2016	
15	DF	(Greece) Stratos Svarnas	(Greece) Xanthi	Free transfer	20 July 2016	
19	FW	(Algeria) Rafik Djebbour	(Greece) Aris	End of contract	9 September 2016	
30	MF	(Argentina) Diego Buonanotte	(Chile) Universidad Católica	Contract termination	20 July 2016	
33	FW	(Croatia) Ivan Brečević	Free agent	End of contract	1 July 2016	
36	MF	(Argentina) Bruno Zuculini	(England) Manchester City	Loan return	1 July 2016	
99	FW	(Nigeria) Macauley Chrisantus	(Spain) Reus	Contract termination	7 July 2016	
—	MF	(Greece) Kyriakos Andreopoulos	(Greece) Iraklis	Contract termination	22 July 2016	
—	MF	(Senegal) Ablaye Faye	Free agent	Contract termination	20 July 2016	
—	MF	(Greece) Dimitrios Anakoglou	(Greece) Aris	Contract termination	25 July 2016	

==== Winter ====
No.	Pos.	Player	To	Fee	Date	Source
3	DF	(Uruguay) Juan Díaz	Free agent	Contract termination	3 March 2017	
6	DF	(England) Joleon Lescott	(England) Sunderland	Contract termination	14 November 2016	
11	FW	(Greece) Vangelis Platellas	(Greece) Atromitos	Contract termination	21 December 2016	
17	FW	(Montenegro) Darko Zorić	(Serbia) Čukarički	Contract termination	4 January 2017	
—	MF	(Greece) Vasilios Karvounidis	(Greece) Triglia Rafinas	Contract termination	14 January 2017	

=== Loan in ===
==== Winter ====
No.	Pos.	Player	From	Fee	Date	Until	Option to buy	Source
11	FW	(Argentina) Sergio Araujo	(Spain) Las Palmas	€200,000	27 January 2017	30 June 2017	✗	

=== Loan out ===
==== Summer ====
No.	Pos.	Player	To	Fee	Date	Until	Option to buy	Source
2	MF	(Greece) Stavros Vasilantonopoulos	(Greece) Veria	Free	2 September 2016	30 June 2017	✗	
13	GK	(Greece) Panagiotis Dounis	(Greece) Kallithea	Free	31 August 2016	30 June 2017	✗	
24	FW	(Greece) Andreas Vlachomitros	(Serbia) Javor Ivanjica	Free	5 July 2016	31 December 2016	✗	
—	MF	(Greece) Vasilios Karvounidis	(Greece) A.E. Kifisia	Free	30 July 2016	11 January 2017	✗	
—	FW	(Greece) Antonis Kyriazis	(Greece) A.E. Kifisia	Free	1 September 2016	30 June 2017	✗	

==== Winter ====
No.	Pos.	Player	To	Fee	Date	Until	Option to buy	Source
55	DF	(Greece) Adam Tzanetopoulos	(Greece) Iraklis	Free	9 January 2017	30 June 2016	✗	

=== Contract renewals ===
No.	Pos.	Player	Date	Former Exp. Date	New Exp. Date	Source
5	DF	(Greece) Vasilios Lampropoulos	12 April 2017	30 June 2017	30 June 2019	
12	DF	(Brazil) Rodrigo Galo	13 January 2017	30 June 2017	30 June 2019	
13	GK	(Greece) Panagiotis Dounis	19 August 2016	30 June 2017	30 June 2019	
25	MF	(Greece) Konstantinos Galanopoulos	19 April 2017	30 June 2018	30 June 2021	
27	DF	(Greece) Michalis Bakakis	12 April 2017	30 June 2017	30 June 2019	

=== Overall transfer activity ===
==== Expenditure ====
Summer: ▼€950,000

Winter: ▼€200,000

Total: ▼€1,150,000

==== Income ====
Summer: ▲€750,000

Winter: ▲€0

Total: ▲€750,000

==== Net Totals ====
Summer: ▼€200,000

Winter: ▼€200,000

Total: ▼€400,000

== Pre-season and friendlies ==
6 July 2016 Friendly	AEK Athens	1–0	Baník Ostrava	Częstochowa
18:00 EEST (UTC+3)	Tzanetopoulos (yellow card) 17'; Lampropoulos 53'	Report	Ožvolda (yellow card) 58'; Helešic (yellow card) 90+2'	Stadium: Stadion Piłkarski; Referee: Marcin Szrek (Poland)

9 July 2016 Friendly	Korona Kielce	0–2	AEK Athens	Kielce
19:00 EEST (UTC+3)	Grzelak (yellow card) 47'	Report	Vargas (yellow card) 47'; Mantalos 65'; Aravidis 74'	Stadium: Arena Kielce

12 July 2016 Friendly	Wigry Suwałki	0–1	AEK Athens	Ostrowiec Świętokrzyski
18:00 EEST (UTC+3)	Bartkowski (yellow card) 43'; Zapolnik (yellow card) 68'; Karankiewicz (yellow card) 71'; Bucholc (yellow card) 90'	Report	Bakasetas (yellow card) 63'; Lampropoulos 88'; Pekhart (penalty missed) 90'	Stadium: Miejski Stadion Sportowy "KSZO"

14 July 2016 Friendly	AEK Athens	3–0	Pogoń Siedlce	Częstochowa
18:00 EEST (UTC+3)	Platellas 63'; Bakasetas 75'; Paczkowski 81' (o.g.); Pekhart (yellow card) 90+1'	Report		Stadium: Stadion Piłkarski

20 July 2016 Friendly	AEK Athens	2–0	Aris Limassol	Fyli
18:30 EEST (UTC+3)	Pekhart 12'; Tzanetopoulos 86'	Report		Stadium: Fyli Municipal Stadium; Attendance: Behind closed doors

10 August 2016 Friendly	Trikala	1–2	AEK Athens	Trikala
19:00 EEST (UTC+3)	Giannitsanis 74'	Report	Almeida 16'; Patito 45'; Bakakis (yellow card) 52'	Stadium: Trikala Stadium; Referee: Alexandros Aretopoulos (Trikala)

13 August 2016 Friendly	AEK Athens	4–0	Iraklis	Marousi
20:00 EEST (UTC+3)	Almeida 49'; Mantalos 60'; Pekhart 63'; Bakasetas 71'	Report		Stadium: Olympic Stadium; Attendance: Behind closed doors Referee: Ioannis Neofitiadis (Corinth)

20 August 2016 Friendly	Atromitos	0–0	AEK Athens	Peristeri
19:15 EEST (UTC+3)		Report		Stadium: Peristeri Stadium; Attendance: Behind closed doors Referee: Ilias Spathas (Piraeus)

24 August 2016 Friendly	Aris	1–2	AEK Athens	Thessaloniki
19:30 EEST (UTC+3)	Tsoumanis (yellow card) 65'; Intzidis 68'	Report	Mantalos 16', 21'	Stadium: Kleanthis Vikelidis Stadium; Attendance: 10,000; Referee: Dimitrios Karantonis (Imathia)

24 August 2016 Friendly	AEK Athens	1–3	Apollon Smyrnis	Marousi
19:00 EEST (UTC+3)	Patito 73'	Report	Diamantopoulos 22'; Kassos 61'; Stergidis 83'	Stadium: Olympic Stadium; Attendance: Behind closed doors Referee: Evangelos Evangelou (Athens)

3 September 2016 Friendly	Anorthosis Famagusta	1–3	AEK Athens	Larnaca
19:00 EEST (UTC+3)	Gonçalves 37'; Victor (yellow card) 48'	Report	Aguilar 2' (o.g.); Almeida 49'; Christodoulopoulos 73'	Stadium: Antonis Papadopoulos Stadium; Referee: Leondios Trattos (Cyprus)

7 October 2016 Friendly	Kallithea	0–4	AEK Athens	Kallithea
17:30 EEST (UTC+3)		Report	Patito 36'; Aravidis 57'; Platellas 60'; Almeida 67'	Stadium: Grigoris Lamprakis Stadium; Attendance: Behind closed doors Referee: Evangelos Evangelou (Athens)

19 November 2016 Friendly	AEK Athens	0–1	Atromitos	Marousi
15:00 EET (UTC+2)		Report	Tonso 7'	Stadium: Olympic Stadium; Attendance: Behind closed doors Referee: Evangelos Zaravinos (Athens)

== Competitions ==
=== Overall record ===
Competition	First match	Last match	Starting round	Final position	Record							
Competition	First match	Last match	Starting round	Final position	Pld	W	D	L	GF	GA	GD	Win %
Super League	11 September 2016	30 April 2017	Matchday 1	4th	30	14	11	5	54	23	+31	46.67
Super League Play-offs	14 May 2017	31 May 2017	Matchday 1	Winners	6	4	0	2	5	3	+2	66.67
Greek Cup	25 October 2016	6 May 2017	Group stage	Runners-up	10	5	3	2	19	6	+13	50.00
UEFA Europa League	28 July 2016	4 August 2016	Third qualifying round	Third qualifying round	2	0	1	1	0	1	−1	0.00
Total					48	23	15	10	78	33	+45	47.92

Last updated: 31 May 2017
Source: Competitions

=== Super League Greece ===
==== Regular season ====
===== League table =====
Pos	Team	Pld	W	D	L	GF	GA	GD	Pts	Qualification or relegation
2	PAOK (Note: PAOK were deducted three points as they did not show up to the second semi-final match against Olympiacos in last year's Greek Cup.)	30	20	4	6	52	19	+33	61	Qualification for the Play-offs
3	Panathinaikos	30	16	9	5	45	19	+26	57	Qualification for the Play-offs
4	AEK Athens	30	14	11	5	54	23	+31	53	Qualification for the Play-offs
5	Panionios	30	15	7	8	35	23	+12	52	Qualification for the Play-offs
6	Xanthi	30	13	9	8	34	25	+9	48	

Source: Super League Greece
Rules for classification: 1) Points; 2) Head-to-head points; 3) Head-to-head goal difference; 4) Goals scored; 5) Goals against; 6) Play-offs (neutral ground); 7) Draw.
(Note: Criteria 6 is only used if needed to decide champion, teams for relegation or teams for UEFA competitions).

===== Results summary =====
Overall								Home						Away					
Pld	W	D	L	GF	GA	GD	Pts	W	D	L	GF	GA	GD	W	D	L	GF	GA	GD
30	14	11	5	54	23	+31	53	9	5	1	36	7	+29	5	6	4	18	16	+2

Last updated: 2017-04-30.
Source: Super League Greece

===== Results by Matchday =====
Round	1	2	3	4	5	6	7	8	9	10	11	12	13	14	15	16	17	18	19	20	21	22	23	24	25	26	27	28	29	30
Ground	H	A	H	A	H	A	A	H	A	H	A	H	A	H	H	A	H	A	H	A	H	H	A	H	A	H	A	H	A	A
Result	D	L	W	W	D	L	W	D	L	D	D	W	D	W	D	L	W	D	W	D	W	W	D	W	W	L	W	W	W	D
Position	9	11	6	5	5	7	7	7	8	8	10	7	7	5	6	7	6	6	6	6	5	5	6	5	5	5	5	5	4	4

Updated to match(es) played on 30 April 2017. Source: slgr.gr
A = Away; H = Home; W = Win; D = Draw; L = Loss; P = Postponed

===== Matches =====
4 January 2017 1	AEK Athens	0–0	Panetolikos	Marousi
17:15 EET (UTC+2)	Galo (yellow card) 27'; Simões (yellow card) 90+5'	Report	Rocha (yellow card) 41'; Paulo (yellow card) 71'; Rosa (yellow card) 77'	Stadium: Olympic Stadium; Attendance: 5,221; Referee: Stavros Mantalos (Kavala); Man of the Match: Dimitrios Kyriakidis
Note: The match was put as Matchday 1 and postponed to 4 January 2017.

7 January 2017 2	Asteras Tripolis	3–2	AEK Athens	Tripoli
19:30 EET (UTC+2)	Stanisavljević (yellow card) 19', (goal) 50'; Igor 66'; Tsoukalas (yellow card) 74', (goal) 80'; Manias (yellow card) 88'	Report	Lampropoulos (yellow card) 24'; Pekhart 36', 68'; Vranješ (yellow card) 57' (yellow-red card) 71'	Stadium: Theodoros Kolokotronis Stadium; Attendance: 828; Referee: Dimitris Styliaras (Aetoloacarnania); Man of the Match: Stavros Tsoukalas
Note: The match was put as Matchday 2 and postponed to 7 January 2017.

11 September 2016 3	AEK Athens	4–1	Xanthi	Marousi
16:00 EEST (UTC+3)	Almeida 7', 17', (yellow card) 37'; Mantalos 10'; Lampropoulos (yellow card) 60'; Vilà 76', (yellow card) 79'	Report	Younés 12', (yellow card) 75'; Soltani (yellow card) 79'	Stadium: Olympic Stadium; Attendance: 11,677; Referee: Georgios Kominis (Thesprotia); Man of the Match: Hugo Almeida

17 September 2016 4	Veria	0–2	AEK Athens	Veria
20:00 EEST (UTC+3)	Navalovski (yellow card) 45'	Report	Bakasetas 18'; Vargas (yellow card) 76', (goal) 87'	Stadium: Veria Stadium; Attendance: 3,111; Referee: Charalampos Kalogeropoulos (Athens); Man of the Match: Anastasios Bakasetas

26 September 2016 5	AEK Athens	0–0	Iraklis	Marousi
19:30 EEST (UTC+3)	Simões (yellow card) 12'; Bakasetas (yellow card) 41'	Report	Kouros (yellow card) 4'; Bartolini (yellow card) 26'; Perrone (yellow card) 39'; Huanderson (yellow card) 71'; Angelopoulos (yellow card) 84'	Stadium: Olympic Stadium; Attendance: 9,673; Referee: Giorgos Blanas (Messinia); Man of the Match: Huanderson

2 October 2016 6	Olympiacos	3–0	AEK Athens	Piraeus
20:30 EEST (UTC+3)	Ideye 6'; Botía (yellow card) 35'; Martins 64'; Fortounis 79'	Report	Mantalos (yellow card) 41'; Patito (yellow card) 59'; Bakasetas (yellow card) 74'	Stadium: Karaiskakis Stadium; Attendance: 24,175; Referee: Anastasios Sidiropoulos (Dodecanese); Man of the Match: André Martins

17 October 2016 7	AEL	1–2	AEK Athens	Larissa
19:30 EEST (UTC+3)	Fatjon (yellow card) 21'; Golias (yellow card) 26'; Nazlidis 33'; Jovanović (yellow card) 90+5'	Report	Platellas 4', 30'; Galo (yellow card) 23' (yellow-red card) 73'; Chyhrynskyi (yellow card) 24'; Christodoulopoulos (yellow card) 45' (yellow-red card) 90+5'; Johansson (yellow card) 68'; Mantalos (yellow card) 90+1'	Stadium: AEL FC Arena; Attendance: 4,379; Referee: Georgios Kominis (Thesprotia); Man of the Match: Vangelis Platellas

22 October 2016 8	AEK Athens	0–0	Panionios	Marousi
20:30 EEST (UTC+3)	Platellas (yellow card) 65'; Almeida (yellow card) 76'; Bakasetas (yellow card) 89'	Report	Risvanis (yellow card) 52'; Ikonomou (yellow card) 66'; Gianniotis (yellow card) 80'; Ngog (yellow card) 90+4'	Stadium: Olympic Stadium; Attendance: 7,121; Referee: Giannis Papadopoulos (Macedonia); Man of the Match: Manolis Siopis

30 October 2016 9	PAOK	1–0	AEK Athens	Thessaloniki
19:30 EET (UTC+2)	Djalma (yellow card) 17'; Matos 90+4'	Report	Kolovetsios (yellow card) 28'	Stadium: Toumba Stadium; Attendance: 18,741; Referee: Anastasios Sidiropoulos (Dodecanese); Man of the Match: Léo Matos

5 November 2016 10	AEK Athens	2–2	Atromitos	Marousi
19:30 EET (UTC+2)	Mantalos 2', (yellow card) 83'; Patito 60'	Report	Le Tallec 71'; Umbides 75'	Stadium: Olympic Stadium; Attendance: 6,802; Referee: Stavros Mantalos (Kavala); Man of the Match: Javier Umbides

15 January 2017 11	Panathinaikos	0–0	AEK Athens	Ampelokipoi
19:30 EET (UTC+2)	Kourbelis (yellow card) 57'; Leto (yellow card) 76'; Villafáñez (yellow card) 90'	Report	Kolovetsios (yellow card) 55'; Barkas (yellow card) 79'; Mantalos (yellow card) 85'; Simões (yellow card) 90'	Stadium: Leoforos Alexandras Stadium; Attendance: 6,955; Referee: Georgios Kominis (Thesprotia); Man of the Match: Vasilis Barkas

26 November 2016 12	AEK Athens	3–0	Platanias	Marousi
19:30 EET (UTC+2)	Mantalos (yellow card) 45+1', (goal) 77', 89'; Lampropoulos (yellow card) 61'; Aravidis 87'	Report	Giakoumakis (yellow card) 85'	Stadium: Olympic Stadium; Attendance: 3,822; Referee: Christos Granas (Xanthi); Man of the Match: Petros Mantalos

3 December 2016 13	Kerkyra	1–1	AEK Athens	Corfu
19:30 EET (UTC+2)	Gomes (yellow card) 65'; Thuram 74'; Spinoulas (yellow card) 90+1'; Koutsavasilis (yellow card) 90+4'	Report	Lampropoulos 14'; Almeida (yellow card) 44'; Kolovetsios (yellow card) 76'; Galanopoulos (yellow card) 90+4'	Stadium: Kerkyra Stadium; Attendance: 1,556; Referee: Charalampos Kalogeropoulos (Athens); Man of the Match: Fotis Koutzavasilis

10 December 2016 14	AEK Athens	4–0	Levadiakos	Marousi
19:30 EET (UTC+2)	Simões 28'; Pekhart 50'; Galanopoulos 67'; Patito 81'	Report	Mendy (yellow card) 5'; Namașco (red card) 17'; Mantzios (yellow card) 45'; Milhazes (yellow card) 58'; Vasileiou (yellow card) 78'	Stadium: Olympic Stadium; Attendance: 3,755; Referee: Giorgos Blanas (Messinia); Man of the Match: Konstantinos Galanopoulos

19 December 2016 15	AEK Athens	1–1	PAS Giannina	Marousi
19:30 EET (UTC+2)	Aravidis (red card) 10'; Patito (yellow card) 55'; Pekhart 67'; Dídac (yellow card) 90+1'	Report	Berios (yellow card) 10'; Boukouvalas (yellow card) 30'; Kozoronis (yellow card) 34'; Garoufalias (yellow card) 45'; Michail (yellow card) 81'; Maboulou 90+4'	Stadium: Olympic Stadium; Attendance: 4,069; Referee: Triantafillos Tikas (Karditsa); Man of the Match: Christopher Maboulou

18 January 2017 16	Panetolikos	3–2	AEK Athens	Agrinio
17:15 EET (UTC+2)	Markovski 12' (pen.); Koutromanos (yellow card) 43'; Makos 55', 82'	Report	Barkas (yellow card) 11'; Almeida 22'; Galanopoulos 33'; Vranješ (yellow card) 39'	Stadium: Panetolikos Stadium; Attendance: 2,006; Referee: Stavros Mantalos (Kavala); Man of the Match: Grigoris Makos

22 January 2017 17	AEK Athens	2–0	Asteras Tripolis	Marousi
15:00 EET (UTC+2)	Pekhart 24', (yellow card) 25'; Mantalos 57'	Report	Bertos (yellow card) 68'	Stadium: Olympic Stadium; Attendance: 5,025; Referee: Anastasios Sidiropoulos (Dodecanese); Man of the Match: Petros Mantalos

28 January 2017 18	Xanthi	0–0	AEK Athens	Xanthi
19:30 EET (UTC+2)	Baxevanidis (yellow card) 27'; Triadis (yellow card) 54' (yellow-red card) 58'	Report	Galo (red card) 6'; Simões (yellow card) 52'; Vranješ (yellow card) 68'; Mantalos (yellow card) 73'; Pekhart (yellow card) 87'; Galanopoulos (yellow card) 89'	Stadium: Xanthi FC Arena; Attendance: 1,890; Referee: Giannis Papadopoulos (Macedonia); Man of the Match: Ognjen Vranješ

5 February 2017 19	AEK Athens	6–0	Veria	Marousi
15:00 EET (UTC+2)	Christodoulopoulos 12', 89'; Lampropoulos 15'; Mantalos 25'; Tomás 36' (o.g.); Vranješ 40'	Report	Asigba (yellow card) 66'	Stadium: Olympic Stadium; Attendance: 7,396; Referee: Aristotelis Diamantopoulos (Arcadia); Man of the Match: Ognjen Vranješ

13 February 2017 20	Iraklis	2–2	AEK Athens	Thessaloniki
19:30 EET (UTC+2)	Stamou (yellow card) 15'; Perrone 39'; Leozinho (yellow card) 52'; Kouros (yellow card) 62'; Monteiro 64'; Intzoglou (yellow card) 80'; Huanderson (yellow card) 88'; Pasas (yellow card) 90+1'	Report	Vargas 19', (yellow card) 43'; Bakakis (yellow card) 62' (yellow-red card) 82'; Christodoulopoulos 76'	Stadium: Kaftanzoglio Stadium; Attendance: 1,118; Referee: Giorgos Foukakis (Heraklion); Man of the Match: Lazaros Christodoulopoulos

19 February 2017 21	AEK Athens	1–0	Olympiacos	Marousi
19:30 EET (UTC+2)	Dídac (yellow card) 32'; Ajdarević (yellow card) 32', (goal) 34'; Vranješ (yellow card) 48'; Bakasetas (yellow card) 59'; Araujo (yellow card) 90+1'	Report	Figueiras (yellow card) 27'; Botía (yellow card) 32' (yellow-red card) 75'; Da Costa (yellow card) 33'; Elyounoussi (yellow card) 45'; Martins (yellow card) 79'	Stadium: Olympic Stadium; Attendance: 28,046; Referee: Stavros Mantalos (Kavala); Man of the Match: Astrit Ajdarević

26 February 2017 22	AEK Athens	3–0	AEL	Marousi
15:00 EET (UTC+2)	Kolovetsios (yellow card) 15'; Pekhart 24', (yellow card) 34'; Chyhrynskyi 81'; Almeida 90+1'	Report	Fatjon (yellow card) 16'; Aganović (yellow card) 51'; Reyes (yellow card) 75'	Stadium: Olympic Stadium; Attendance: 5,504; Referee: Aristomenis Koutsiaftis (Arta); Man of the Match: Tomáš Pekhart

6 March 2017 23	Panionios	1–1	AEK Athens	Nea Smyrni
19:30 EET (UTC+2)	Siopis (yellow card) 35'; Masouras 59'; Masoud (yellow card) 61'	Report	Christodoulopoulos (yellow card) 11'; Ajdarević (yellow card) 35'; Araujo 38'; Vranješ (yellow card) 40'; Dídac (yellow card) 75'	Stadium: Nea Smyrni Stadium; Attendance: 4,979; Referee: Ioannis Papadopoulos (Macedonia); Man of the Match: Sergio Araujo

12 March 2017 24	AEK Athens	3–0	PAOK	Marousi
19:30 EET (UTC+2)	Araujo 1', 85', (yellow card) 29'; Simões (yellow card) 74'; Aravidis 90+1'	Report	Crespo (yellow card) 5'; Malezas (yellow card) 40' (yellow-red card) 53'	Stadium: Olympic Stadium; Attendance: 11,879; Referee: Anastasios Papapetrou (Athens); Man of the Match: Sergio Araujo

18 March 2017 25	Atromitos	0–1	AEK Athens	Peristeri
19:30 EET (UTC+2)	Maniatis (yellow card) 90+2'	Report	Johansson (yellow card) 45+2'; Mantalos 57'; Simões (yellow card) 86'; Ajdarević (yellow card) 89'	Stadium: Peristeri Stadium; Attendance: 1,265; Referee: Dimitrios Thanos (Grevena); Man of the Match: Petros Mantalos

2 April 2017 26	AEK Athens	2–3	Panathinaikos	Marousi
19:30 EEST (UTC+3)	Lampropoulos (yellow card) 21'; Simões (yellow card) 35'; Vranješ (yellow card) 38'; Christodoulopoulos 62' (pen.); Pekhart 77'	Report	Villafáñez (yellow card) 12'; Klonaridis 24'; Berg 27', 90'; Zeca (yellow card) 48'; Vlachodimos (yellow card) 70'; Leto (yellow card) 79'	Stadium: Olympic Stadium; Attendance: 18,526; Referee: Ioannis Papadopoulos (Macedonia); Man of the Match: Tomáš Pekhart

6 April 2017 27	Platanias	0–2	AEK Athens	Chania
19:30 EEST (UTC+3)	Pryndeta (yellow card) 34'; Karypidis (yellow card) 53'	Report	Vinícius 18'; Ajdarević (yellow card) 25'; Aravidis 67'; Mantalos (yellow card) 68'	Stadium: Perivolia Municipal Stadium; Attendance: 2,463; Referee: Charalampos Kalogeropoulos (Athens); Man of the Match: Christos Aravidis

9 April 2017 28	AEK Athens	5–0	Kerkyra	Marousi
19:00 EEST (UTC+3)	Bakasetas 23', 54'; Pekhart 39', 79'; Dídac 43'	Report		Stadium: Olympic Stadium; Attendance: 5,112; Referee: Aristotelis Diamantopoulos (Arcadia); Man of the Match: Anastasios Bakasetas

23 April 2017 29	Levadiakos	0–2	AEK Athens	Livadeia
19:00 EEST (UTC+3)	Mendy (yellow card) 82'; Silva (yellow card) 82'	Report	Araujo 87'; Moulopoulos 90+5' (o.g.)	Stadium: Levadia Municipal Stadium; Attendance: 1,153; Referee: Prazitelis Zachariadis (Macedonia); Man of the Match: Sergio Araujo

30 April 2017 30	PAS Giannina	1–1	AEK Athens	Ioannina
19:00 EEST (UTC+3)	Lila 38'	Report	Vargas (yellow card) 45'; Patito 80'	Stadium: Zosimades Stadium; Attendance: 3,019; Referee: Kostas Kotsanis (Drama); Man of the Match: Patito Rodríguez

==== Play-offs ====
===== Table =====
Pos	Team	Pld	W	D	L	GF	GA	GD	Pts	Qualification
2	AEK Athens	6	4	0	2	5	3	+2	12	Qualification for the Champions League third qualifying round
3	Panathinaikos (Note: Panathinaikos were deducted 3 points due to fan behavior against PAOK.)	6	3	1	2	6	7	−1	8	Qualification for the Europa League third qualifying round (Note: PAOK qualified for the Europa League third qualifying round by winning the Greek Cup.)
4	PAOK (Note: PAOK were deducted 6 points due to fan behavior against AEK Athens in Greek Cup final.)	6	3	0	3	7	5	+2	5	Qualification for the Europa League third qualifying round
5	Panionios	6	1	1	4	3	6	−3	4	Qualification for the Europa League second qualifying round

Source: Super League Greece: Standings, Schedule
Rules for classification: 1) Points; 2) Head-to-head points; 3) Head-to-head goal difference; 4) Goals scored; 5) Goals against; 6) Regular season position.

===== Results summary =====
Overall								Home						Away					
Pld	W	D	L	GF	GA	GD	Pts	W	D	L	GF	GA	GD	W	D	L	GF	GA	GD
6	4	0	2	5	3	+2	12	2	0	1	2	1	+1	2	0	1	3	2	+1

Last updated: 2017-05-31.
Source: Super League Greece

===== Results by Matchday =====
Round	1	2	3	4	5	6
Ground	A	H	H	A	H	A
Result	W	L	W	L	W	W
Position	2	3	2	2	2	2

Updated to match(es) played on 31 May 2017. Source: slgr.gr
A = Away; H = Home; W = Win; D = Draw; L = Loss; P = Postponed

===== Matches =====
14 May 2017 1	PAOK	0–1	AEK Athens	Thessaloniki
20:30 EEST (UTC+3)	Matos (yellow card) 42'; Campos (yellow card) 52'; Henrique (yellow card) 77'; Pelkas (yellow card) 87'	Report	Dídac 10' (yellow card) 88'; Christodoulopoulos (yellow card) 37'; Mantalos (yellow card) 44'; Ajdarević (yellow card) 52'; Simões (yellow card) 75'; Bakasetas (yellow card) 90+1'	Stadium: Toumba Stadium; Attendance: 15,413; Referee: Charalampos Kalogeropoulos (Athens); Man of the Match: Dídac Vilà

17 May 2017 2	AEK Athens	0–1	Panionios	Marousi
18:30 EEST (UTC+3)	Vranješ (yellow card) 36'	Report	Yeşil 7', (yellow card) 18'; Vlachos (yellow card) 48'; Oikonomou (yellow card) 49'; Korbos (yellow card) 60'	Stadium: Athens Olympic Stadium; Attendance: 3,509; Referee: Athanasios Tzilos (Larisa); Man of the Match: Samed Yeşil

21 May 2017 3	AEK Athens	1–0	Panathinaikos	Marousi
20:30 EEST (UTC+3)	Christodoulopoulos 85'; Simões (yellow card) 90'	Report	Leto (yellow card) 83'	Stadium: Athens Olympic Stadium; Attendance: 5,318; Referee: Dimitrios Thanos (Grevena); Man of the Match: Konstantinos Galanopoulos

24 May 2017 4	Panathinaikos	1–0	AEK Athens	Ampelokipoi
20:30 EEST (UTC+3)	Moledo (yellow card) 17'; Hult (yellow card) 53'; Leto 62' (pen.); Molins (yellow card) 90+4'	Report	Galanopoulos (yellow card) 17'; Vranješ (yellow card) 45+1' (yellow-red card) 90+6'; Dídac (yellow card) 77'	Stadium: Leoforos Alexandras Stadium; Attendance: 3,857; Referee: Praxitelis Zachariadis (Macedonia); Man of the Match: Sebastián Leto

28 May 2017 5	AEK Athens	1–0	PAOK	Marousi
20:30 EEST (UTC+3)	Christodoulopoulos (penalty missed) 6', (yellow card) 25'; Mantalos (yellow card) 20'; Bakasetas 42'; Johansson (yellow card) 80'	Report	Campos (yellow card) 20'; Henrique (yellow card) 36'; Prijović (yellow card) 45+1'; Charisis (yellow card) 45+1'; Matos (yellow card) 64'; Malezas (yellow card) 90+2' (yellow-red card) 90+6'; Crespo (yellow card) 90+5'	Stadium: Athens Olympic Stadium; Attendance: 3,552; Referee: Dimitrios Thanos (Grevena); Man of the Match: Anastasios Bakasetas

31 May 2017 6	Panionios	1–2	AEK Athens	Nea Smyrni
20:30 EEST (UTC+3)	Masouras 21'; Ben (yellow card) 40' (yellow-red card) 57'; Gianniotis (yellow card) 76'; Lamprou (yellow card) 90+4'; Masoud (yellow card) 90+4'	Report	Chyhrynskyi (yellow card) 28'; Mantalos 34'; Galanopoulos (yellow card) 61'; Vranješ (yellow card) 62'; Christodoulopoulos (red card) 64'; Dídac (yellow card) 74'; Simões (yellow card) 76'; Araujo 81', (yellow card) 82'; Vinícius (yellow card) 90+6'	Stadium: Nea Smyrni Stadium; Attendance: 1,532; Referee: Stavros Mantalos (Athens); Man of the Match: Petros Mantalos

=== Greek Cup ===
==== Group F ====
Pos	Team	Pld	W	D	L	GF	GA	GD	Pts	Qualification	AEK	LAM	KER	ASA
1	AEK Athens	3	1	2	0	6	2	+4	5	Round of 16		—	4–0	—
2	Lamia	3	1	2	0	3	2	+1	5	Round of 16	0–0		—	1–0
3	Kerkyra	3	1	1	1	8	6	+2	4		—	2–2		—
4	Anagennisi Karditsa	3	0	1	2	2	9	−7	1		2–2	—	0–6	

Source: epo.gr

==== Matches ====
===== Group stage =====
25 October 2016 1	AEK Athens	4–0	Kerkyra	Marousi
19:30 EEST (UTC+3)	Galo 7'; Christodoulopoulos 78'; Pekhart 80'; Diogo 89' (o.g.)	Report	Andreopoulos (yellow card) 25'; Diogo (yellow card) 63'; Adilehou (yellow card) 72'; Arnarellis (yellow card) 90'	Stadium: Olympic Stadium; Attendance: 2,500; Referee: Evangelos Kiotzenis (Xanthi); Man of the Match: Rodrigo Galo

29 November 2016 2	Anagennisi Karditsa	2–2	AEK Athens	Karditsa
19:30 EET (UTC+2)	Diatta (yellow card) 11'; Kiskabanis (yellow card) 12'; Tzekos 68'; Maïga 76'; Bitelis (yellow card) 80'	Report	Pekhart 36', 47'	Stadium: Municipal Stadium of Karditsa; Referee: Aristeidis Vatsios (West Attica); Man of the Match: Tomáš Pekhart

14 December 2016 3	Lamia	0–0	AEK Athens	Lamia
17:15 EET (UTC+2)	Anastasiadis (yellow card) 41'; Papargyriou (yellow card) 66'; Durmishaj (yellow card) 72'	Report	Galanopoulos (yellow card) 20'; Patito (yellow card) 69'	Stadium: Lamia Municipal Stadium; Attendance: 4,500; Referee: Manolis Skoulas (Thessaly); Man of the Match: Anestis Anastasiadis

===== Round of 16 =====
25 January 2017 First leg	Levadiakos	0–1	AEK Athens	Livadeia
15:00 EET (UTC+2)	Vouros (yellow card) 37'; Karachalios (yellow card) 41'; Mendy (yellow card) 76'; Magas (yellow card) 84'	Report	Kolovetsios (yellow card) 59'; Bakasetas 71'; Melikiotis (yellow card) 73'	Stadium: Levadia Municipal Stadium; Attendance: 150; Referee: Evangelos Evangelou (Athens); Man of the Match: Anastasios Bakasetas

1 February 2017 Second leg	AEK Athens	6–0 (7–0 agg.)	Levadiakos	Marousi
19:30 EET (UTC+2)	Bakasetas 21'; Araujo 28', 61'; Vargas 68'; Kolovetsios 79'; Galanopoulos 84'; Dídac (yellow card) 86'	Report	Youssouf (yellow card) 40'; Coulibaly (yellow card) 50'; Tripotseris (yellow card) 76'; Niasse (yellow card) 88'	Stadium: Olympic Stadium; Attendance: 3,000; Referee: Georgios Giannoulakis (Chania); Man of the Match: Sergio Araujo

===== Quarter-finals =====
9 February 2017 First leg	Platanias	0–0	AEK Athens	Chania
17:15 EET (UTC+2)	Signevich (yellow card) 32'; Apostolopoulos (yellow card) 63'; Kargas (yellow card) 75'	Report		Stadium: Perivolia Municipal Stadium; Attendance: 2,000; Referee: Georgios Blanas (Messinia); Man of the Match: Antonis Kokkalas

1 March 2017 Second leg	AEK Athens	3–0 (3–0 agg.)	Platanias	Marousi
19:30 EET (UTC+2)	Christodoulopoulos 13' (pen.); Vranješ (yellow card) 16'; Araujo 28'; Johansson 58'	Report	Banana (red card) 12'	Stadium: Olympic Stadium; Referee: Anastasios Sidiropoulos (Dodecanese); Man of the Match: Sergio Araujo

===== Semi-finals =====
13 April 2017 First leg	Olympiacos	1–2	AEK Athens	Piraeus
19:30 EEST (UTC+3)	Figueiras 12'; Marin (yellow card) 29'; Romao (yellow card) 36'	Report	Araujo 6'; Simões (yellow card) 34'; Mantalos (yellow card) 36'; Patito 64'	Stadium: Karaiskakis Stadium; Referee: Anastasios Papapetrou (Athens); Man of the Match: Sergio Araujo

26 April 2017 Second leg	AEK Athens	0–1 (2(a)–2 agg.)	Olympiacos	Marousi
19:00 EEST (UTC+3)	Vranješ (yellow card) 21'; Simões (yellow card) 23'; Dídac (yellow card) 75'; Johansson (yellow card) 79'; Araujo (yellow card) 87'; Anestis (yellow card) 90+5' (yellow-red card) 90+6'	Report	Romao (yellow card) 4' (goal) 72'; Marin (yellow card) 41'; Kapino (yellow card) 45+2'; da Costa (yellow card) 90+5' (yellow-red card) 90+9'	Stadium: Olympic Stadium; Attendance: 33,512; Referee: Anastasios Sidiropoulos (Dodecanese); Man of the Match: Sergio Araujo
Note: AEK finished the match with Almeida playing as a goalkeeper, after the dismissall of Anestis.

===== Final =====
6 May 2017 Final	PAOK	2–1	AEK Athens	Volos
20:30 EEST (UTC+3)	Crespo (yellow card) 14'; Biseswar 24'; Matos (yellow card) 70'; Henrique 81', (yellow card) 89'; Glykos (yellow card) 90+4'	Report	Patito (yellow card) 16'; Christodoulopoulos 26'; Simões (yellow card) 80'	Stadium: Panthessaliko Stadium; Attendance: 19,236; Referee: Giorgos Kominis (Thesprotia); Man of the Match: Diego Biseswar
Note: Violent incidents occurred between the ultras of the two clubs before the match, which resulted in the punishment of both teams with sanctions on their stadium.

=== UEFA Europa League ===
==== Third qualifying round ====
The draw for the third qualifying round was held on 15 July 2016.

28 July 2016 First leg	Saint-Étienne (France)	0–0	(Greece) AEK Athens	Saint-Étienne, France
22:00 EEST (UTC+3)	Polomat (yellow card) 21'; Hamouma (yellow card) 42'; Dabo (yellow card) 90'	Report	Barbosa (yellow card) 56'; Bakasetas (yellow card) 77'	Stadium: Stade Geoffroy-Guichard; Attendance: 30,438; Referee: Antonio Damato (Italy)

4 August 2016 Second leg	AEK Athens (Greece)	0–1	(France) Saint-Étienne	Athens, Greece
21:00 EEST (UTC+3)		Report	Berić 23'; Tannane (yellow card) 47'	Stadium: Olympic Stadium; Attendance: 25,004; Referee: Alon Yefet (Israel)

== Statistics ==
=== Squad statistics ===
As of 31 May 2017

No.	Pos	Player	Super League		Super League Play-offs		Greek Cup		Europa League		Total	
No.	Pos	Player	Apps	Goals	Apps	Goals	Apps	Goals	Apps	Goals	Apps	Goals
Goalkeepers
1	GK	(Greece) Vasilis Barkas	20	0	1	0	1	0	0	0	22	0
16	GK	(Greece) Ilias Vouras	0	0	0	0	0	0	0	0	0	0
22	GK	(Greece) Giannis Anestis	10	0	5	0	9	0	2	0	26	0
87	GK	(Greece) Giannis Papadopoulos	0	0	0	0	0	0	0	0	0	0
Defenders
4	DF	(Bosnia and Herzegovina) Ognjen Vranješ	12	1	5	0	6	0	0	0	23	1
5	DF	(Greece) Vasilios Lampropoulos	23	2	0	0	5	0	1	0	29	2
12	DF	(Brazil) Rodrigo Galo	23	0	5	0	6	1	2	0	36	1
17	DF	(Brazil) Vinícius Freitas	6	1	1	0	0	0	0	0	7	1
19	DF	(Ukraine) Dmytro Chyhrynskyi	10	1	6	0	4	0	2	0	22	1
23	DF	(Spain) Dídac Vilà	26	2	6	1	8	0	2	0	42	3
24	DF	(Greece) Konstantinos Manolas	0	0	0	0	1	0	0	0	1	0
26	DF	(Greece) Dimitrios Kolovetsios	20	0	1	0	6	1	2	0	29	1
27	DF	(Greece) Michalis Bakakis	9	0	2	0	4	0	0	0	15	0
33	DF	(Greece) Giorgos Giannoutsos	0	0	0	0	2	0	0	0	2	0
—	DF	(Greece) Alkis Markopouliotis	0	0	0	0	0	0	0	0	0	0
Midfielders
6	MF	(Sweden) Astrit Ajdarević	15	1	4	0	4	0	0	0	23	1
8	MF	(Portugal) André Simões	22	1	5	0	8	0	2	0	37	1
18	MF	(Sweden) Jakob Johansson	28	0	5	0	8	1	1	0	42	1
20	MF	(Greece) Petros Mantalos	26	7	5	0	8	0	2	0	41	7
25	MF	(Greece) Konstantinos Galanopoulos	12	2	5	0	9	1	1	0	27	3
30	MF	(Greece) Ilias Tselios	2	0	0	0	2	0	0	0	4	0
Forwards
7	FW	(Greece) Lazaros Christodoulopoulos	24	4	6	1	6	2	0	0	36	7
9	FW	(Portugal) Hugo Almeida	16	4	5	0	5	0	1	0	27	4
10	FW	(Venezuela) Ronald Vargas	16	2	1	0	3	1	2	0	22	3
11	FW	(Argentina) Sergio Araujo	9	4	6	1	6	4	0	0	21	9
14	FW	(Czech Republic) Tomáš Pekhart	23	9	3	0	4	3	1	0	31	12
21	FW	(Greece) Christos Aravidis	13	3	0	0	3	0	1	0	17	3
28	FW	(Greece) Anastasios Bakasetas	19	3	5	0	5	2	2	0	31	5
29	FW	(Argentina) Patito Rodríguez	22	3	2	0	6	1	0	0	30	4
31	FW	(Greece) Dimitris Melikiotis	0	0	0	0	2	0	0	0	2	0
40	FW	(Greece) Andreas Vlachomitros	0	0	0	0	0	0	0	0	0	0
Left during Summer Transfer Window
—	FW	(Portugal) Hélder Barbosa	0	0	0	0	0	0	2	0	2	0
Left during Winter Transfer Window
3	DF	(Uruguay) Juan Díaz	1	0	0	0	3	0	0	0	4	0
55	DF	(Greece) Adam Tzanetopoulos	0	0	0	0	2	0	0	0	2	0
—	DF	(England) Joleon Lescott	4	0	0	0	0	0	0	0	4	0
—	FW	(Montenegro) Darko Zorić	0	0	0	0	2	0	0	0	2	0
—	FW	(Greece) Vangelis Platellas	5	2	0	0	1	0	2	0	8	2

=== Goalscorers ===
As of 31 May 2017
The list is sorted by competition order when total goals are equal, then by position and then by squad number.

Rank	No.	Pos.	Player	Super League	Super League Play-offs	Greek Cup	Europa League	Total
1	14	FW	(Czech Republic) Tomáš Pekhart	9	0	3	0	12
2	11	FW	(Argentina) Sergio Araujo	4	1	4	0	9
3	20	MF	(Greece) Petros Mantalos	7	1	0	0	8
4	7	FW	(Greece) Lazaros Christodoulopoulos	4	1	2	0	7
5	28	FW	(Greece) Anastasios Bakasetas	3	1	2	0	6
6	9	FW	(Portugal) Hugo Almeida	4	0	0	0	4
6	29	FW	(Argentina) Patito Rodríguez	3	0	1	0	4
8	21	FW	(Greece) Christos Aravidis	3	0	0	0	3
8	23	DF	(Spain) Dídac Vilà	2	1	0	0	3
8	10	MF	(Venezuela) Ronald Vargas	2	0	1	0	3
8	25	MF	(Greece) Konstantinos Galanopoulos	2	0	1	0	3
12	5	DF	(Greece) Vasilios Lampropoulos	2	0	0	0	2
12	—	FW	(Greece) Vangelis Platellas	2	0	0	0	2
14	8	MF	(Portugal) André Simões	1	0	0	0	1
14	6	MF	(Sweden) Astrit Ajdarević	1	0	0	0	1
14	19	DF	(Ukraine) Dmytro Chyhrynskyi	1	0	0	0	1
14	4	DF	(Bosnia and Herzegovina) Ognjen Vranješ	1	0	0	0	1
14	18	MF	(Sweden) Jakob Johansson	0	0	1	0	1
14	12	DF	(Brazil) Rodrigo Galo	0	0	1	0	1
14	26	DF	(Greece) Dimitrios Kolovetsios	0	0	1	0	1
14	17	DF	(Brazil) Vinícius	0	0	1	0	1
Own goals				2	0	1	0	3
Totals				53	5	19	0	77

=== Assists ===
As of 31 May 2017
The list is sorted by competition order when total assists are equal, then by position and then by squad number.

Rank	No.	Pos.	Player	Super League	Super League Play-offs	Greek Cup	Europa League	Total
1	20	MF	(Greece) Petros Mantalos	5	2	3	0	10
2	7	FW	(Greece) Lazaros Christodoulopoulos	5	1	0	0	6
2	29	FW	(Argentina) Patito Rodríguez	5	0	1	0	6
2	10	MF	(Venezuela) Ronald Vargas	4	0	2	0	6
5	12	DF	(Brazil) Rodrigo Galo	2	0	1	0	3
5	18	MF	(Sweden) Jakob Johansson	2	0	1	0	3
5	11	FW	(Argentina) Sergio Araujo	1	1	1	0	3
8	23	DF	(Spain) Dídac Vilà	2	0	0	0	2
8	6	MF	(Sweden) Astrit Ajdarević	1	0	1	0	2
10	14	FW	(Czech Republic) Tomáš Pekhart	1	0	0	0	1
10	4	DF	(Bosnia and Herzegovina) Ognjen Vranješ	0	0	1	0	1
10	—	FW	(Greece) Vangelis Platellas	0	0	1	0	1
10	31	FW	(Greece) Dimitrios Melikiotis	0	0	1	0	1
10	17	FW	(Montenegro) Darko Zorić	0	0	1	0	1
Totals				28	4	14	0	46

=== Clean sheets ===
As of 31 May 2017
The list is sorted by competition order when total clean sheets are equal and then by squad number. Clean sheets in games where both goalkeepers participated are awarded to the goalkeeper who started the game. Goalkeepers with no appearances are not included.

Rank	No.	Player	Super League	Super League Play-offs	Greek Cup	Europa League	Total
1	22	(Greece) Giannis Anestis	5	4	5	1	15
2	1	(Greece) Vasilis Barkas	12	0	1	0	13
Totals			17	4	6	1	28

=== Disciplinary record ===
As of 31 May 2017

N	P	Nat.	Name	Super League			Super League Play-offs			Greek Cup			Europa League			Total			Notes
N	P	Nat.	Name	Yellow card	Second yellow card	Red card	Yellow card	Second yellow card	Red card	Yellow card	Second yellow card	Red card	Yellow card	Second yellow card	Red card	Yellow card	Second yellow card	Red card	Notes
Goalkeepers
1	GK	(Greece)	Vasilis Barkas	2												2			
16	GK	(Greece)	Ilias Vouras																
22	GK	(Greece)	Giannis Anestis							2	1					2	1		
87	GK	(Greece)	Giannis Papadopoulos																
Defenders
4	DF	(Bosnia and Herzegovina)	Ognjen Vranješ	7	1		3	1		2						12	2		
5	DF	(Greece)	Vasilios Lampropoulos	4												4			
12	DF	(Brazil)	Rodrigo Galo	2	1	1										2	1	1	
17	DF	(Brazil)	Vinícius Freitas				1									1			
19	DF	(Ukraine)	Dmytro Chyhrynskyi	1			1									2			
23	DF	(Spain)	Dídac Vilà	4			3			2						9			
24	DF	(Greece)	Konstantinos Manolas																
26	DF	(Greece)	Dimitrios Kolovetsios	4						1						5			
27	DF	(Greece)	Michalis Bakakis	2	1											2	1		
33	DF	(Greece)	Giorgos Giannoutsos																
—	DF	(Greece)	Alkis Markopouliotis																
Midfielders
6	MF	(Sweden)	Astrit Ajdarević	4			1									5			
8	MF	(Portugal)	André Simões	7			3			3						13			
18	MF	(Sweden)	Jakob Johansson	2			1			1						4			
20	MF	(Greece)	Petros Mantalos	7			2			1						10			
25	MF	(Greece)	Konstantinos Galanopoulos	2			2			1						5			
30	MF	(Greece)	Ilias Tselios																
Forwards
7	FW	(Greece)	Lazaros Christodoulopoulos	3	1		2		1							5	1	1	
9	FW	(Portugal)	Hugo Almeida	3												3			
10	FW	(Venezuela)	Ronald Vargas	3												3			
11	FW	(Argentina)	Sergio Araujo	2			1			1						4			
14	FW	(Czech Republic)	Tomáš Pekhart	3												3			
21	FW	(Greece)	Christos Aravidis			1												1	
28	FW	(Greece)	Anastasios Bakasetas	4			1						1			6			
29	FW	(Argentina)	Patito Rodríguez	2						2						4			
31	FW	(Greece)	Dimitris Melikiotis							1						1			
31	FW	(Greece)	Andreas Vlachomitros																
Left during Summer Transfer window
—	FW	(Portugal)	Hélder Barbosa										1			1			
Left during Winter Transfer window
3	DF	(Uruguay)	Juan Díaz																
55	DF	(Greece)	Adam Tzanetopoulos																
—	DF	(England)	Joleon Lescott																
—	FW	(Montenegro)	Darko Zorić																
—	FW	(Greece)	Vangelis Platellas	1												1			

=== Starting 11 ===
This section presents the most frequently used formation along with the players with the most starts across all competitions.

N.	Formation	Matchday(s)
21	4–2–3–1	3–6, 9, 11, 12, 15–18, 20–22
12	4–3–3	1, 2, 14, 23–26
8	4–4–2	10, 19, 28–30
3	4–1–4–1	7, 8
3	3–5–2	27
1	4–4–2 (D)	13

No.	Nat.	Player	Pos.
22	(Greece)	Giannis Anestis	GK
26	(Greece)	Dimitris Kolovetsios	RCB
5	(Greece)	Vasilios Lambropoulos	LCB
4	(Bosnia and Herzegovina)	Ognjen Vranješ	RB
23	(Spain)	Dídac Vilà	LB
18	(Sweden)	Jakob Johansson	CM
8	(Portugal)	André Simões	DM
12	(Brazil)	Rodrigo Galo	RM
20	(Greece)	Petros Mantalos (C)	LM
6	(Sweden)	Astrit Ajdarević	AM
11	(Argentina)	Sergio Araujo	CF

Last updated: 2017-05-31

== Awards ==
Player	Pos.	Award	Source
(Portugal) Hugo Almeida	FW	MVP Award (3rd Matchday)	
(Portugal) Hugo Almeida	FW	Best Goal Award (3rd Matchday)	
(Greece) Vangelis Platellas	FW	MVP Award (7th Matchday)	
(Argentina) Patito Rodríguez	FW	Best Goal Award (10th Matchday)	
(Greece) Vasilis Barkas	GK	MVP Award (11th Matchday)	
(Portugal) André Simões	MF	Best Goal Award (14th Matchday)	
(Argentina) Sergio Araujo	FW	MVP Award (24th Matchday)	
(Argentina) Sergio Araujo	FW	Best Goal Award (24th Matchday)	
(Greece) Petros Mantalos	MF	Greek Player of the Season	
(Greece) Petros Mantalos	MF	Team of the Season	
