= Fotis =

Fotis, in Greek: "Φώτης" is a Greek name, a variant of the name Photios. Notable people with the name include:

- Fotis Balopoulos, Greek footballer
- Fotis Dulos, suspected perpetrator of the Murder of Jennifer Dulos
- Fotis Georgiou, Greek footballer
- Fotis Goudroubis, Greek footballer
- Fotis Gouziotis, Greek footballer
- Fotis Ioannidis, Greek footballer
- Fotis Kafatos, Greek biologist
- Fotis Kaimakamoudis, Greek footballer
- Fotis Karagiolidis, Greek footballer
- Fotis Kezos, Cypriot footballer
- Fotis Kipouros, Greek footballer
- Fotis Kitsos, Greek footballer
- Fotis Konstantinidis, Greek footballer
- Fotis Kosmas, Greek hurdler and decathlete
- Fotis Koutzavasilis, Greek footballer
- Fotis Kouvelis, Greek lawyer and politician
- Fotis Lagos, Greek footballer
- Fotis Mastihiadis, Greek chess player
- Fotis Mavriplis, Greek alpine skier
- Fotis Outsikas, Greek footballer
- Fotis Pantekidis, Greek footballer
- Fotis Papadopoulos (footballer, born 1954)
- Fotis Papadopoulos (footballer, born 1975)
- Fotis Papoulis, Cypriot footballer
- Fotis Perlikos, Greek politician
- Fotis Polymeris, Greek musician
- Fotis Sotiropoulos, Greek professor
- Fotis Takianos, Greek basketball player
