= Konstantinos Galanopoulos =

Greek footballer

Kostas Galanopoulos
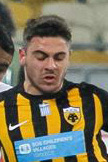
- Galanopoulos with AEK Athens in 2018

Personal information
- Full name: Konstantinos Galanopoulos
- Date of birth: 28 December 1997 (age 28)
- Place of birth: Athens, Greece
- Height: 1.72 m (5 ft 8 in)
- Positions: Defensive midfielder; central midfielder

Team information
- Current team: Aris
- Number: 6

Youth career
- 2011–2015: AEK Athens

Senior career*
Years	Team	Apps	(Gls)
2015–2025	AEK Athens	114	(8)
2025	APOEL	14	(1)
2025–	Aris	17	(0)

International career^{‡}
2015	Greece U18	1	(0)
2015–2016	Greece U19	8	(0)
2016–2018	Greece U21	14	(2)
2018–	Greece	9	(1)
- * Club domestic league appearances and goals as of 22 August 2026 ‡ National team caps and goals as of 23 March 2025

Konstantinos "Kostas" Galanopoulos (Greek: Κωνσταντίνος "Κώστας" Γαλανόπουλος; born 28 December 1997) is a Greek international footballer who plays as a midfielder for Super League club Aris and Greece.

== Club career ==
=== AEK Athens ===
Galanopoulos started his career from Kentavros Vrilission at a young age. In 2011, he moved at AEK Athens academy and on 21 August 2015 he signed a professional contract for three next years. Despite having André Simões and Jakob Johansson in front of him in the AEK's roster, Galanopoulos managed to earn playing time this season with the club and showed great potential for his career ahead. On 31 May 2016, he made his professional debut, with AEK, against Panionios, for the Super League Play-offs. On 28 July 2016, he made his European debut in a 0–0 away game against Saint-Étienne for the first leg of the third qualifying round of UEFA Europa League. On 10 December 2016, he netted his first goal with the club in a 4–0 home win against Levadiakos. He was named MVP of the match.

In AEK's title winning 2017–18 season, Galanopoulos was often included in the starting line-up by Manolo Jiménez, forming a productive partnership with André Simões in the middle. Shielding the defence, the diminutive Greek (standing at 172 cm tall) provides an effective transition to the attacking third, able to protect possession and pass the ball forward accurately. On April 19, 2017, Galanopoulos agreed to a contract extension with AEK, until the summer of 2021. On 31 March 2019, he scored his first goal for the 2018–19 season as Christos Albanis found Galanopoulos and the AEK midfielder skipped past a Panetolikos defender before firing past Dimitris Kyriakidis in a 4–0 home win game against Panetolikos. On 30 June 2019, according to multiple reports, Galanopoulos agreed to a new deal, according to the original contract terms, which will see him remain at the club for the next two seasons. On 14 December 2019, Galanopoulos lashing in a winning goal in the 84th minute in a vital away 1–0 win against Xanthi. It was his first goal for the season.

On 18 December 2019, during the game against Asteras Tripolis, in-form midfielder was substituted with a nasty ankle injury, and subsequent medical tests have confirmed that the 21-year-old requires surgery. As a result of the seriousness of the injury, Galanopoulos will be unavailable to play for the next 1,5 months.

On 25 August 2020, Galanopoulos agreed to a contract extension with AEK, until the summer of 2023.

On 22 November 2020, he sealed a triumphant 4–1 home win against AEL. After the end of the match, Galanopoulos burst into tears, having previously been to the sidelines for 11 months. On 6 January 2021, he scored helping to a 1–0 home win against Panetolikos. On 24 January 2021, he scored in an eventual 2–2 away draw in the Double-headed eagles derby against PAOK.

On 18 April 2021, he scored in a 3–1 home win against Asteras Tripolis. On 29 April 2021, he scored the opener with a header after a corner kick by Muamer Tanković but the host team responded with two goals by Michael Krmenčík and Andrija Živković, and ΑΕΚ lost 2–1 to PAOK at Toumba Stadium in the 2nd leg of the semi-final of 2020–21 Greek Cup and disqualified from the final of the competition.

On 8 October 2021, Galanopoulos suffered from an ankle injury, that which required immediate surgical treatment. The rehabilitation period was estimated at six months. It will be his third surgery, as in the 2019–20 season, Galanopoulos underwent surgery on the cartilage of his ankle. On 4 February 2021, he suffered a fracture in his right shoulder. In the first injury he was left out for 250 days, while another significant period of absence followed (59 days to be exact) for his shoulder.

On 15 August 2023, after coming off as a substitute, Galanopoulos scored a crucial goal in the 90th minute, to provide the win for his team, in a Champions League qualifier against Dinamo Zagreb. The goal is of even greater significance, as the game was emotionally charged, as it was the aftermath of the brutal murder of Michalis Katsouris by Dinamo ultras in Athens, eight days earlier. In memory of the victim, he celebrated the goal by taking off and holding up his black armband that was worn by all AEK players that day, in respect to Katsouris' death.

== International career ==
He has played for Greece U19 and Greece U21. On 15 May 2018, he made his debut with Greece in a 2–0 friendly game against Saudi Arabia.

== Career statistics ==
=== Club ===
As of 24 May 2025

Appearances and goals by club, season and competition
Club	Season	League			National Cup		Continental		Other		Total	
Club	Season	Division	Apps	Goals	Apps	Goals	Apps	Goals	Apps	Goals	Apps	Goals
AEK Athens	2015–16	Super League Greece	1	0	0	0	—		—		1	0
AEK Athens	2016–17	Super League Greece	18	2	9	1	1 (Note: Appearances in UEFA Europa League)	0	—		28	3
AEK Athens	2017–18	Super League Greece	19	0	6	0	10 (Note: 1 appearance in UEFA Champions League, 9 in UEFA Europa League)	0	—		35	0
AEK Athens	2018–19	Super League Greece	17	1	1	0	9 (Note: Appearances in UEFA Champions League)	0	—		27	1
AEK Athens	2019–20	Super League Greece	13	1	0	0	2	0	—		15	1
AEK Athens	2020–21	Super League Greece	19	4	4	1	4	0	—		27	5
AEK Athens	2021–22	Super League Greece	1	0	0	0	0	0	—		1	0
AEK Athens	2022–23	Super League Greece	12	0	5	0	—		—		17	0
AEK Athens	2023–24	Super League Greece	14	0	0	0	5 (Note: Two appearances and one goal in UEFA Champions League, two appearances in UEFA Europa League)	1	—		19	1
AEK Athens	2024–25	Super League Greece	0	0	1	0	1 (Note: One appearance in UEFA Europa Conference League)	0	—		2	0
AEK Athens	Total		114	8	26	2	32	1	—		172	11
AEK Athens B	2024–25	Super League Greece 2	1	0	0	0	—		—		1	0
APOEL	2024–25	Cypriot First Division	14	1	2	1	2 (Note: Two appearances in UEFA Europa Conference League)	0	—		18	2
Career total			129	9	28	3	34	1	0	0	191	13

=== International ===
As of 23 March 2025

Greece
Year	Apps	Goals
2018	1	0
2019	3	1
2021	2	0
2023	2	0
2024	0	0
2025	1	0
Total	9	1

=== International goals ===
Scores and results list Greece's goal tally first.

No.	Date	Venue	Opponent	Score	Result	Competition
1.	18 November 2019	Olympic Stadium, Athens, Greece	Finland	2–1	2–1	UEFA Euro 2020 qualification

== Honours ==
AEK Athens

- Super League: 2017–18, 2022–23
- Greek Cup: 2015–16, 2022–23
