= Photinus (name) =

Photinus or Photeinos (Greek: Φωτεινός, 'bright') is a Greek given name.

It is commonly associated with Photinus of Sirmium (died 276), a Christian bishop and heresiarch.

Other people with the name include:

- Photinus of Thessalonica (fl. late 5th century)
- Photeinos (strategos) (fl. 820s), Byzantine commander

== See also ==
- Photios (name)
- Fotino (disambiguation)
- Photinus (beetle), genus of fireflies
