= Fotino =

Fotino or Foteino may refer to:

== People ==
- Dionisie Fotino (1769–1821), a Wallachian historian
- Mihai Fotino (1930–2014), a Romanian actor
- Mișu Fotino (1886-1970), a Romanian actor

== Places ==
- Foteino, Arta, a village in Greece
- Foteino, a settlement in the Ioannina regional unit, Greece
- Foteino, a settlement in the Trikala regional unit, Greece

== Other uses ==
- Fotino, a Space tether mission

== See also ==
- Photinus (name)
- Photino, a hypothetical subatomic particle
