= Petros Mantalos =

Greek footballer

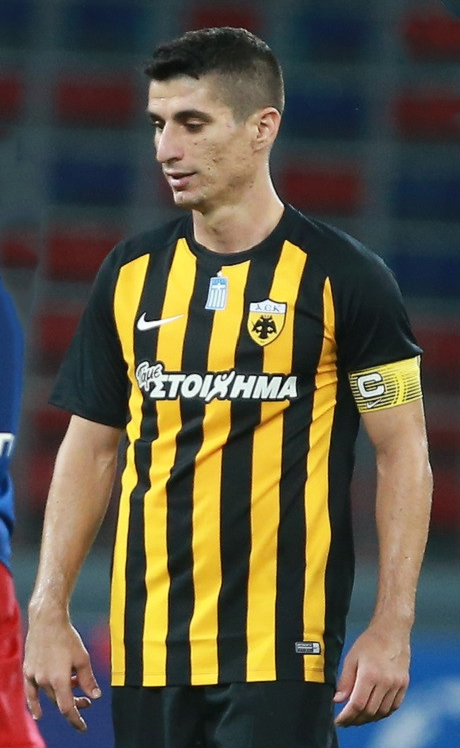
- Mantalos with AEK Athens in 2017

Personal information
- Date of birth: 31 August 1991 (age 35)
- Place of birth: Komotini, Greece
- Height: 1.77 m (5 ft 10 in)
- Position: Midfielder

Team information
- Current team: AEK Athens
- Number: 20

Youth career
- 2006–2009: Skoda Xanthi

Senior career*
Years	Team	Apps	(Gls)
2009–2014	Skoda Xanthi	81	(12)
2014–	AEK Athens	318	(44)

International career^{‡}
2009–2010	Greece U19	9	(4)
2011–2012	Greece U21	6	(0)
2014–2025	Greece	71	(7)
- * Club domestic league appearances and goals as of 20 September 2026 ‡ National team caps and goals as of 18 November 2025

Petros Mantalos (Greek: Πέτρος Μάνταλος; born 31 August 1991) is a Greek professional footballer who plays as a midfielder for Super League club AEK Athens.

== Club career ==
=== Skoda Xanthi ===
Petros Mantalos began playing professional football for Super League club Skoda Xanthi. He played a total of 90 games (15 goals, 10 assists) in all competitions and represented his country at under-19 and under-21 levels. His performances attracted the interest of Greek giants Olympiacos, Panathinaikos and AEK Athens, the latter club newly relegated from the Super League, bankrupt, and making a fresh start in the third-tier Football League 2. In July 2013, Mantalos agreed to join AEK from the 2014–15 season. The fee was reported as around €500,000. He remained with Xanthi for the 2013–14 season, making 30 Super League appearances as well as playing in the UEFA Europa League.

=== AEK Athens ===
By the time Mantalos joined up with AEK, they had been promoted to the second-tier Football League. He made his debut on 12 September in the first round of the Greek Cup, and his first league appearance on 19 October 2014 at home to Apollon Smyrnis: with his team losing 1–0, Mantalos took the free kick from which Alexandre D'Acol equalised and then converted a penalty to complete a 2–1 win. He went on to score 11 goals and provide 15 assists in 23 matches in League and Cup combined. Mantalos himself missed the last few weeks of the season, having ruptured his anterior cruciate ligament while playing in a cup derby against Olympiacos in March 2015. He said afterwards that it was his first major injury, he was not going to rush his recovery, and that AEK could manage well enough without him. This they proved, finishing top of the South Group and then winning the play-offs.

After six months out, Mantalos returned to competitive action and continued as a regular in the first team, helping AEK finish third in the 2015–16 season and qualify for the Europa League. He scored the only goal of the first leg of the Greek Cup semi-final against Atromitos, and captained the side in the final at the Olympic Stadium. His first-half headed goal contributed to AEK's 2–1 defeat of champions Olympiacos to win the competition for the 15th time, and he was named MVP of the match.

According to an end-of-season profile, Mantalos "endured a difficult start to the campaign", which was interrupted by the need for surgery on a nose broken in training, "but seemed rejuvenated once Manolo Jiménez took over the team" in January 2017. He finished the season with a goal and an assist in a 2–1 win against Panionios in the play-offs that confirmed AEK's place in the UEFA Champions League third qualifying round, and was voted best Greek footballer in the Super League at the PSAP awards. In light of interest from Spanish clubs, AEK were reported to be unwilling to sell at less than €5 or € million, as the player still had two years left on his contract.

AEK went top of the Super League three weeks into the 2017–18 season after a 4–0 win over AEL, in which Mantalos opened the scoring with a fourth-minute bicycle kick. Although AEK failed to progress in the Champions League, they qualified for the Europa League group stage; in their first match, Mantalos scored as AEK beat Rijeka 2–1. A few days later, he scored an 89th-minute winner as they came back from 2–0 down after 63 minutes to beat reigning champions Olympiacos 3–2. At the end of October, Mantalos suffered another ruptured ACL, this time in his left knee. As a gesture of support, the club offered Mantalos a contract extension until 2022, which he accepted. He returned to action as a substitute on 21 April as AEK beat Levadiakos to clinch their first Super League title since 1994.

Mantalos converted a penalty in a 1–1 draw in the Champions League play-off round second leg against Vidi that, despite having two men sent off, was enough to progress to the group stage on aggregate. Two days after reports emerged that the club had rejected a bid valued at €10 million for Mantalos from English Championship club West Bromwich Albion, he scored his first goal of the 2018–19 Super League season, a penalty, that gave AEK a 1–0 win away to Asteras Tripolis. His fourth league goal, which opened the scoring in a 2–0 win away to Panionios in January 2019, was controversial as he appeared to handle the ball when controlling the final pass. Mantalos scored twice against Atromitos in the quarter-final of that season's Greek Cup as AEK went on to reach and lose to PAOK in the final for the third year running.

Mantalos scored in both legs of AEK's 2019–20 Europa League qualifier against Universitatea Craiova, but despite his goal in the play-off round against Trabzonspor, the tie ended 3–3 on aggregate and AEK were eliminated on away goals. On 20 October 2019, he scored a brace sealing a vital 3–2 home win game against Volos. It was elected MVP of the game. On 7 December 2019, he scored with an excellent kick in a hammering 5–0 home win game against Panionios. On 18 December 2019, Mantalos opened the scoring from the penalty spot after six minutes to put Massimo Carrera’s AEK in front in a 2–1 home win game against Asteras Tripolis. On 23 February 2020, Mantalos scored with a diagonal header into the corner, after five minutes from a Marko Livaja's cross, in a 3–0 home win game against OFI. On 4 March 2020, Marko Livaja picked out the onrushing Mantalos on the left, and the latter calmly stroked the ball into the far corner beyond Julián Cuesta, opening the score in a slender 2–1 advantage against Aris in Athens, with the second leg of the Greek Cup semi-final to be played at the Kleanthis Vikelidis Stadium next month. At the end of the regular season, Mantalos has showed a consistency throughout the entire campaign and as a result clubs from Turkey, including Super Lig leaders İstanbul Başakşehir, are reportedly eager to sign the 28-year-old in the upcoming transfer window.

At mid August 2020, UAE Pro League club Al-Nasr offer an amount of €4.3 million for the Greek international. According to information, AEK are considering the proposal from Al-Nasr, with negotiations continuing between the two organisations. Mantalos would reportedly earn in the region of €1 million per year with Al-Nasr, but the transfer is not completed.

On 19 September 2020, in the 2020–21 Super League Greece opener, Mantalos scored as a substitute sealing a 2–0 away win against Panetolikos. On 5 November 2020, he scored in a 4–1 away win 2020–21 UEFA Europa League group stage game against Zorya Luhansk helping AEK to increase the possibility of qualifying for the next phase of the UEFA Europa League. On 22 November 2020, Mantalos made an impressive performance, giving 3 assists and receiving the Man of the Match award in a 4–1 home win against AEL. On 19 March 2021, Mantalos renew his contract with the club until the summer of 2024. On 9 May 2021, he scored a vital goal sealing a 1–0 away victory against rivals Panathinaikos in his club effort to gain the last ticket for 2021–22 UEFA Europa Conference League.

On 30 July 2021, Mantalos scored with a penalty kick at the last moment of the UEFA Europa Conference League game, but AEK faced a frustrated defeat with 3–2 on penalties against FK Velež Mostar, with Sergio Araujo losing the decisive penalty for the club. In the three last seasons, starting from 2019–20 season he has more than 10 assists per year.

== International career ==
As a "second division" player Mantalos' international call in Greece national football team was a big surprise by Claudio Ranieri. On 7 September 2014 Mantalos made his international debut in a match against Romania for the European Qualifiers 2016.

Mantalos scored his first international goal on 7 June 2016 in Melbourne Australia, against Australia in an eventual 2–1 win.

On 7 October 2016, he scored the second goal sealing a 2–0 home win against Cyprus for UEFA World Cup 2018 preliminary round.

He retired from the national team on 23 March 2026.

== Career statistics ==
=== Club ===
As of 30 August 2026

Club	Season	League			Greek Cup		Europe		Other		Total	
Club	Season	Division	Apps	Goals	Apps	Goals	Apps	Goals	Apps	Goals	Apps	Goals
Skoda Xanthi	2009–10	Super League Greece	1	0	0	0	—		—		1	0
Skoda Xanthi	2010–11	Super League Greece	4	0	0	0	—		—		4	0
Skoda Xanthi	2011–12	Super League Greece	17	2	0	0	—		—		17	2
Skoda Xanthi	2012–13	Super League Greece	28	4	3	1	—		—		31	5
Skoda Xanthi	2013–14	Super League Greece	31	6	2	2	4 (Note: Appearances in UEFA Europa League)	0	—		37	8
Skoda Xanthi	Total		81	12	5	3	4	0	0	0	90	15
AEK Athens	2014–15	Football League	15	9	8	2	—		—		23	11
AEK Athens	2015–16	Super League Greece	29	2	7	4	—		—		36	6
AEK Athens	2016–17	Super League Greece	31	7	8	0	2	0	—		41	7
AEK Athens	2017–18	Super League Greece	12	2	2	1	7 (Note: Two appearances in UEFA Champions League, five appearances and one goal in UEFA Europa League)	1	—		21	4
AEK Athens	2018–19	Super League Greece	25	5	6	3	9 (Note: Appearances in UEFA Champions League)	1	—		40	9
AEK Athens	2019–20	Super League Greece	30	6	7	2	4	3	—		41	11
AEK Athens	2020–21	Super League Greece	33	2	5	1	7	1	—		45	4
AEK Athens	2021–22	Super League Greece	31	3	0	0	2 (Note: Appearances in UEFA Conference League)	1	—		33	4
AEK Athens	2022–23	Super League Greece	30	2	8	4	—		—		38	6
AEK Athens	2023–24	Super League Greece	28	1	1	0	10 (Note: Fourappearances in UEFA Champions League and six appearances in UEFA Europa League)	0	—		39	1
AEK Athens	2024–25	Super League Greece	25	2	4	1	3	0	—		32	3
AEK Athens	2025–26	Super League Greece	24	3	3	0	14	0	—		41	3
AEK Athens	2026–27	Super League Greece	2	0	0	0	2	0	1 (Note: Greek Super Cup)	0	5	0
AEK Athens	Total		315	44	59	18	60	7	1	0	435	69
Career total			396	56	64	21	64	7	1	0	525	84

=== International ===
As of 18 November 2025

National team	Year	Apps	Goals
Greece
Greece	2014	3	0
Greece	2015	2	0
Greece	2016	8	2
Greece	2017	5	0
Greece	2018	4	0
Greece	2019	5	1
Greece	2020	5	1
Greece	2021	9	0
Greece	2022	9	2
Greece	2023	8	0
Greece	2024	10	1
Greece	2025	3	0
Total		71	7

As of match played 11 October 2020. Greece score listed first, score column indicates score after each Mantalos goal.

International goals by date, venue, cap, opponent, score, result and competition
No.	Date	Venue	Cap	Opponent	Score	Result	Competition
1	7 June 2016	Docklands Stadium, Melbourne, Australia	7	Australia	1–0	2–1	Friendly
2	7 October 2016	Karaiskakis Stadium, Pireaus, Greece	10	Cyprus	2–0	2–0	2018 FIFA World Cup qualification
3	18 November 2019	Olympic Stadium, Athens, Greece	27	Finland	1–1	2–1	UEFA Euro 2020 qualification
4	11 October 2020	Olympic Stadium, Athens, Greece	31	Moldova	2–0	2–0	2020–21 UEFA Nations League C
5	12 June 2022	Panthessaliko Stadium, Volos, Greece	47	Kosovo	2–0	2–0	2022–23 UEFA Nations League C
6	27 September 2022	Georgios Kamaras Stadium, Athens, Greece	48	Northern Ireland	3–1	3–1	2022–23 UEFA Nations League C
7	13 October 2024	Karaiskakis Stadium, Pireaus, Greece	65	Republic of Ireland	2–0	2–0	2024–25 UEFA Nations League B

== Honours ==
AEK Athens

- Super League Greece: 2017–18, 2022–23, 2025–26
- Greek Football Cup: 2015–16, 2022–23
- Football League Greece: 2014–15 (South Group)

Individual

- Super League Greece Greek Footballer of the Season: 2016–17
- Super League Greece Team of the Season: 2016–17
- Super League Greece top assist provider: 2021–22
- AEK Athens Player of the Season: 2024–25
