= Photios (name) =

Photios (Greek: Φώτιος), also written as Fotios, is a Greek name, latinized as Photius.

It commonly refers to Saint Photios I of Constantinople (c. 810/820 – 893), an Eastern Orthodox scholar and Patriarch of Constantinople.

A modern diminutive variant is Fotis (Greek: Φώτης).

Notable people with the name include:

- Saint Photius the Martyr, a Christian martyr under Emperor Diocletian (died 305)
- Photios (Emirate of Crete) (fl. 870s), Byzantine renegade and admiral of the Emirate of Crete
- Photius, Metropolitan of Moscow (died 1431)
- Archimandrite Photius Spassky (1792–1838), Russian Orthodox archimandrite of Yuriev Monastery in Novgorod
- Photius Fisk (1807/1809 – 1890), a chaplain in the U.S. Navy
- Photios of Korytsa (1862–1906), Greek Orthodox metropolitan bishop of Korçë
- Patriarch Photius of Alexandria (1853–1925)
- Patriarch Photius II of Constantinople (1874–1935)
- Charles-Marie-Photius Maurras (1868–1952), a French author, politician, poet, and critic who was a founder of Action Française
- Photis Kontoglou (1895–1965), Greek writer and iconographer
- Michael Photios (born 1960)
- Fotios Katsikaris (born 1967), Greek basketball coach
- Photis Stephani (born 1971), Cypriot pole vaulter
- Fotios Lampropoulos (born 1983), Greek basketball player
- Fotios Vasilopoulos (born 1986), Greek basketball player
- Fotios Zoumpos (born 1993), Greek basketball player
