= André Simões =

Portuguese footballer

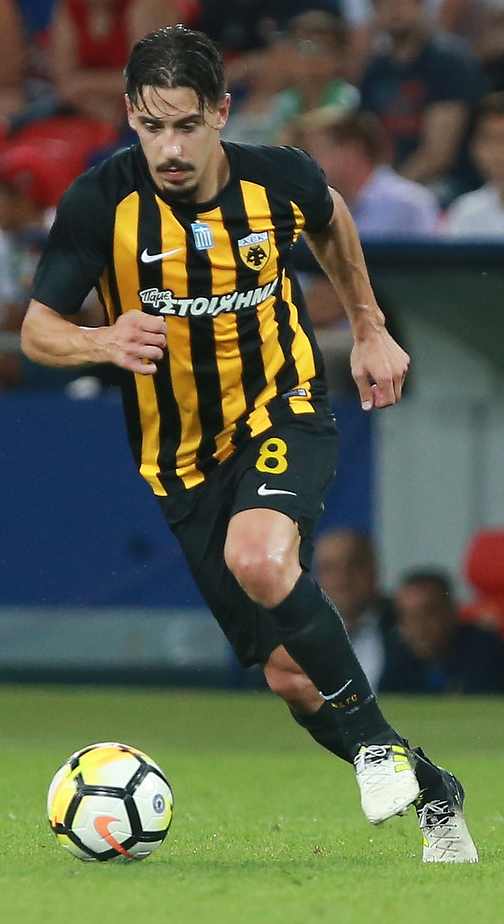
- Simões with AEK Athens in 2017

Personal information
- Full name: André Luís Gomes Simões
- Date of birth: 16 December 1989 (age 36)
- Place of birth: Matosinhos, Portugal
- Height: 1.77 m (5 ft 10 in)
- Position: Defensive midfielder

Youth career
- 1998–2004: Porto
- 2004–2005: Padroense
- 2005–2008: Leixões

Senior career*
| Years | Team | Apps | (Gls) |
| 2008–2011 | Padroense | 95 | (13) |
| 2011–2013 | Santa Clara | 67 | (1) |
| 2013–2015 | Moreirense | 65 | (8) |
| 2015–2022 | AEK Athens | 160 | (7) |
| 2022–2024 | Famalicão | 9 | (0) |
| 2023–2024 | → Leixões (loan) | 14 | (0) |
| 2024–2025 | Leixões | 22 | (0) |
| Total | | 432 | (29) |
- * Club domestic league appearances and goals

André Luís Gomes Simões (Portuguese pronunciation: [ɐ̃ˈdɾɛ siˈmõjʃ]; born 16 December 1989) is a Portuguese former professional footballer who played as a defensive midfielder.

After starting out at Padroense, he spent the better part of his career in Greece with AEK Athens, making 227 competitive appearances and winning the 2017–18 Super League. In his country's Primeira Liga, he represented Moreirense and Famalicão.

== Club career ==
=== Portugal ===
Born in Matosinhos, Simões played with three clubs as a youth, including FC Porto from ages 8 to 14. He first appeared as a senior for Padroense FC, competing two seasons in the third division and one in the fourth.

In summer 2011, Simões signed with C.D. Santa Clara of the Segunda Liga. He played 39 games and scored once in his second year, helping the Azores team to finish in 11th position.

Simões joined fellow second-tier side Moreirense F.C. in late June 2013, helping to a return to the Primeira Liga after one year by contributing two goals and nearly 2,800 minutes of action. He made his debut in the Portuguese top flight on 17 August 2014, playing the full 90 minutes in a 1–0 away win against C.D. Nacional.

=== AEK Athens ===
On 30 January 2015, before the campaign was over, Simões agreed to a two-year contract with AEK Athens F.C. which was made effective on 1 July. On 19 March 2016, he agreed to an extension until 30 June 2019, with a buy-out clause of €7.5 million. On 10 December of that year, he scored his first goal in a 4–0 home victory over Levadiakos F.C. in the Super League Greece.

On 24 August 2017, Simões helped his team defeat Club Brugge KV in the second leg of the play-off round of the UEFA Europa League, netting twice and winning a penalty in the 3–0 home win. On 26 November 2018, however, following a league defeat to Panetolikos FC, AEK owner Dimitris Melissanidis engaged in a heated conversation with three players, ostracising Anastasios Bakasetas, Vasilios Lampropoulos and Simões from the team; in his press-conference ahead of the upcoming UEFA Champions League game against AFC Ajax, head coach Marinos Ouzounidis all but confirmed that the trio had ceased to be part of his plans.

=== Famalicão ===
Simões returned to Portugal in June 2022, signing a three-year deal at top-flight F.C. Famalicão. He made just 14 competitive appearances in his only season.

=== Later career ===
On 1 September 2023, Simões was loaned to his former club Leixões S.C. for the upcoming second-division campaign. In July 2024, he agreed to a permanent one-year contract.

Simões announced his retirement on 4 July 2025, aged 35.

== Career statistics ==
As of 12 May 2024

Appearances and goals by club, season and competition
| Club | Season | League | | | National cup (Note: Includes Taça de Portugal and Greek Cup) | | League cup (Note: Includes Taça da Liga) | | Continental | | Total | |
| Club | Season | Division | Apps | Goals | Apps | Goals | Apps | Goals | Apps | Goals | Apps | Goals |
|---|---|---|---|---|---|---|---|---|---|---|---|---|
| Padroense | 2008–09 | Terceira Divisão | 33 | 2 | 2 | 1 | — | | — | | 35 | 3 |
| Padroense | 2009–10 | Segunda Divisão | 28 | 3 | 3 | 1 | — | | — | | 31 | 4 |
| Padroense | 2010–11 | Segunda Divisão | 34 | 8 | 3 | 0 | — | | — | | 37 | 8 |
| Padroense | Total | | 95 | 13 | 8 | 2 | — | | — | | 103 | 15 |
| Santa Clara | 2011–12 | Liga de Honra | 28 | 0 | 0 | 0 | 7 | 1 | — | | 35 | 1 |
| Santa Clara | 2012–13 | Segunda Liga | 39 | 1 | 1 | 0 | 5 | 0 | — | | 45 | 2 |
| Santa Clara | Total | | 67 | 1 | 1 | 0 | 12 | 1 | — | | 80 | 2 |
| Moreirense | 2013–14 | Segunda Liga | 33 | 2 | 1 | 0 | 2 | 0 | — | | 36 | 2 |
| Moreirense | 2014–15 | Primeira Liga | 32 | 6 | 1 | 0 | 4 | 0 | — | | 37 | 6 |
| Moreirense | Total | | 65 | 8 | 2 | 0 | 6 | 0 | — | | 73 | 8 |
| AEK Athens | 2015–16 | Super League Greece | 31 | 0 | 9 | 0 | — | | — | | 40 | 0 |
| AEK Athens | 2016–17 | Super League Greece | 27 | 1 | 8 | 0 | — | | 2 (Note: Appearances in UEFA Europa League) | 0 | 37 | 1 |
| AEK Athens | 2017–18 | Super League Greece | 20 | 0 | 5 | 0 | — | | 11 (Note: Two appearances in UEFA Champions League, nine appearances and two goals in UEFA Europa League) | 2 | 36 | 2 |
| AEK Athens | 2018–19 | Super League Greece | 15 | 1 | 5 | 0 | — | | 8 (Note: Appearances in UEFA Champions League) | 0 | 28 | 1 |
| AEK Athens | 2019–20 | Super League Greece | 28 | 3 | 5 | 0 | — | | 4 | 0 | 37 | 3 |
| AEK Athens | 2020–21 | Super League Greece | 18 | 2 | 3 | 0 | — | | 5 | 1 | 26 | 3 |
| AEK Athens | 2021–22 | Super League Greece | 21 | 0 | 2 | 1 | — | | — | | 23 | 1 |
| AEK Athens | Total | | 160 | 7 | 37 | 1 | — | | 30 | 3 | 227 | 11 |
| Famalicão | 2022–23 | Primeira Liga | 9 | 0 | 3 | 0 | 2 | 0 | — | | 14 | 0 |
| Leixões (loan) | 2023–24 | Liga Portugal 2 | 14 | 0 | 1 | 0 | 1 | 0 | — | | 16 | 0 |
| Career total | | | 410 | 29 | 52 | 3 | 21 | 1 | 30 | 3 | 513 | 36 |

== Honours ==
Moreirense

- Segunda Liga: 2013–14

AEK Athens

- Super League Greece: 2017–18
- Greek Football Cup: 2015–16

Individual

- Super League Greece Team of the Season: 2017–18
