= Giannis Papadopoulos (footballer, born 1998) =

Greek footballer

Personal information
- Full name: Ioannis Papadopoulos
- Date of birth: 21 September 1998 (age 28)
- Place of birth: Aigio, Greece
- Height: 1.87 m (6 ft 2 in)
- Position: Goalkeeper

Team information
- Current team: Veria
- Number: 87

Youth career
- –2014: Thyella Aigio
- 2014–2016: AEK Athens

Senior career*
Years	Team	Apps	(Gls)
2016–2018	AEK Athens	0	(0)
2017–2018	→ AO Chania−Kissamikos (loan)	9	(0)
2018–2019	AO Chania−Kissamikos	10	(0)
2019–2020	Kavala	3	(0)
2020–2021	Ierapetra	10	(0)
2021–	Veria	13	(0)
- * Club domestic league appearances and goals as of 5 January 2023

Giannis Papadopoulos (Greek: Γιάννης Παπαδόπουλος; born 21 September 1998) is a Greek professional footballer who plays as a goalkeeper for Super League 2 club Veria.
