= Fotis Konstantinidis =

Greek footballer

Personal information
- Date of birth: 25 July 1978 (age 48)
- Place of birth: Greece
- Height: 1.78 m (5 ft 10 in)
- Position: Defender

Team information
- Current team: Alexandroupoli

Senior career*
Years	Team	Apps	(Gls)
1997–1999	Panserraikos F.C.		
1999–2005	Prosotsani F.C.		
2005–2010	Panthrakikos F.C.	76	(5)
2009–2011	Pierikos		
2011–	Alexandroupoli		
- * Club domestic league appearances and goals as of 27 November 2011

Fotis Konstantinidis (Greek: Φώτιος Κωνσταντινίδης; born 25 July 1978) is a Greek footballer. Began his professional football career with Panserraikos F.C. in November 1997. He played as a footballer of Panthrakikos F.C. for 5 years, winning 2 elevation from Gamma Ethniki to Super League (third to first level).

== Career ==
=== Career statistics ===
season	club	league	Championship		Nation cup		Europe cup		Total	
season	club	league	appear	goals	appear	goals	appear	goals	appear	goals
1997–1999	Panserraikos F.C.									
1999–2005	Prosotsani F.C.									
2005–2006	Panthrakikos F.C.	Gamma Ethniki								
2006–2008	Panthrakikos F.C.	Beta Ethniki	54	4	8	0	0	0	62	4
2008–2010	Panthrakikos F.C.	Super League	22	1	0	0	0	0	22	1
2009–2011	Pierikos	Football League								
2011–	Alexandroupoli									
career total			76	5	8	0	0	0	84	5

Last update: 27 Nov 2011
