= Georgios Giannoutsos =

Greek association football player (born 1998)

Giorgos Giannoutsos
Personal information
- Full name: Georgios Giannoutsos
- Date of birth: 16 July 1998 (age 28)
- Place of birth: Psachna, Greece
- Height: 1.83 m (6 ft 0 in)
- Positions: Centre-back; left-back

Team information
- Current team: Iraklis
- Number: 94

Youth career
- 2011–2016: AEK Athens

Senior career*
Years	Team	Apps	(Gls)
2016–2022	AEK Athens	1	(0)
2019–2020	→ Alki Oroklini (loan)	18	(0)
2020–2021	→ Episkopi (loan)	17	(0)
2021–2022	AEK Athens B	23	(0)
2022–2023	Peyia 2014	25	(1)
2023–2025	Lamia	33	(0)
2025–	Iraklis	13	(0)

International career^{‡}
2014–2015	Greece U17	4	(0)
2015–2017	Greece U19	5	(0)
2019	Greece U21	4	(0)
- * Club domestic league appearances and goals as of March 26, 2026 ‡ National team caps and goals as of June 10, 2019

Giorgos Giannoutsos (Greek: Γιώργος Γιαννούτσος; born 16 July 1998) is a Greek professional association football player who plays as a centre-back for Super League club Iraklis.

== Career ==
=== AEK Athens ===
On 26 August 2016, Giannoutsos signed a professional contract with AEK Athens, until the summer of 2020.

==== Loan to Alki Oroklini ====
On 21 July 2019, Giannoutsos was loaned out at Alki Oroklini.

== Career statistics ==
As of 26 March 2026

Appearances and goals by club, season and competition
Club	Season	League			Cup		Continental		Other		Total	
Club	Season	Division	Apps	Goals	Apps	Goals	Apps	Goals	Apps	Goals	Apps	Goals
AEK Athens	2016–17	Super League Greece	0	0	2	0	—		—		2	0
AEK Athens	2017–18	Super League Greece	1	0	3	0	—		—		4	0
AEK Athens	2018–19	Super League Greece	0	0	2	0	—		—		2	0
AEK Athens	Total		1	0	7	0	—		—		8	0
Alki Oroklini (loan)	2019–20	Cypriot Second Division	18	0	2	0	—		—		20	0
Episkopi (loan)	2020–21	Football League	17	0	2	0	—		—		17	0
AEK Athens B	2021–22	Super League Greece 2	23	0	—		—		—		23	0
Peyia 2014	2022–23	Cypriot Second Division	25	1	1	0	—		—		26	1
Lamia	2023–24	Super League Greece	5	0	1	0	—		—		6	0
Lamia	2024–25	Super League Greece	28	0	1	0	—		—		29	0
Lamia	Total		33	0	2	0	—		—		35	0
Iraklis	2025–26	Superleague Greece 2	13	0	2	0	—		—		15	0
Career total			130	1	14	0	0	0	0	0	144	1

== Honours ==
AEK Athens

- Super League Greece: 2017–18
