= Konstantinos Manolas (footballer, born 1993) =

Greek footballer (born 1993)

Personal information
- Date of birth: 26 March 1993 (age 33)
- Place of birth: Athens, Greece
- Height: 1.83 m (6 ft 0 in)
- Position: Defender

Youth career
- 2009–2011: AEK Athens

Senior career*
Years	Team	Apps	(Gls)
2011–2012	Thrasyvoulos	3	(0)
2012–2013	Levadiakos	2	(0)
2013–2015	Chania	44	(4)
2015	Kerkyra	4	(0)
2015–2016	Levadiakos	16	(0)
2016–2017	AEK Athens	1	(0)
2017	Levadiakos	0	(0)
2018	Lokomotiv Sofia	4	(0)
2018	Aittitos Spata	3	(0)
2019	Ionikos	4	(0)
- * Club domestic league appearances and goals as of 23 October 2019

Konstantinos Manolas (Greek: Κωνσταντίνος Μανωλάς; born 26 March 1993) is a Greek former professional footballer who played as a defender.

== Career ==
Konstantinos Manolas began his football career in the youth teams of AEK Athens, and made his professional debut in the 2011–12 season for Thrasyvoulos. In 2013, he was signed by Levadiakos, and played his first Super League game for the club on 14 April 2013 in a 1–0 home loss against PAOK. After only two appearances he signed for Chania. He played for Chania for two seasons before moving yet again in 2015, this time for Super League club Kerkyra.

In August 2015, Kerkyra was accused, and subsequently found guilty, of committing irregularities in its change of ownership. Its playing license was revoked by Super League Greece and the club was relegated to Football League, taking the last position on the league table. As a result of this relegation, Manolas along with other players, signed for his former club Levadiakos a three-years contract for an undisclosed fee.

On 5 August 2016, the son of AEK's legendary veteran and former manager Stelios Manolas, Konstantinos, signed a three-season contract with the Greek Cup winners for an undisclosed fee. On 29 November 2016, he made his debut with the club as a starter in a Greek Cup 2–2 away draw against Anagennisi Karditsa. On 29 August 2017, he mutually solved his contract with AEK, returned to his former club Levadiakos On 24 October 2017, he made his debut with the club in a Greek Cup game against Aiginiakos.

On 13 February 2018, after only one game played with Levadiakos, he solved his contract signing with Second League club Lokomotiv until the summer of 2019 for an undisclosed fee.

On 11 August 2018, he moved to newly promoted side Aittitos Spata on a free transfer.

== Personal life ==
Manolas is the son of the former legend of AEK Athens, Stelios and the cousin of former AEK and Olympiacos international defender, Kostas.
