= Vinícius Freitas =

Brazilian footballer

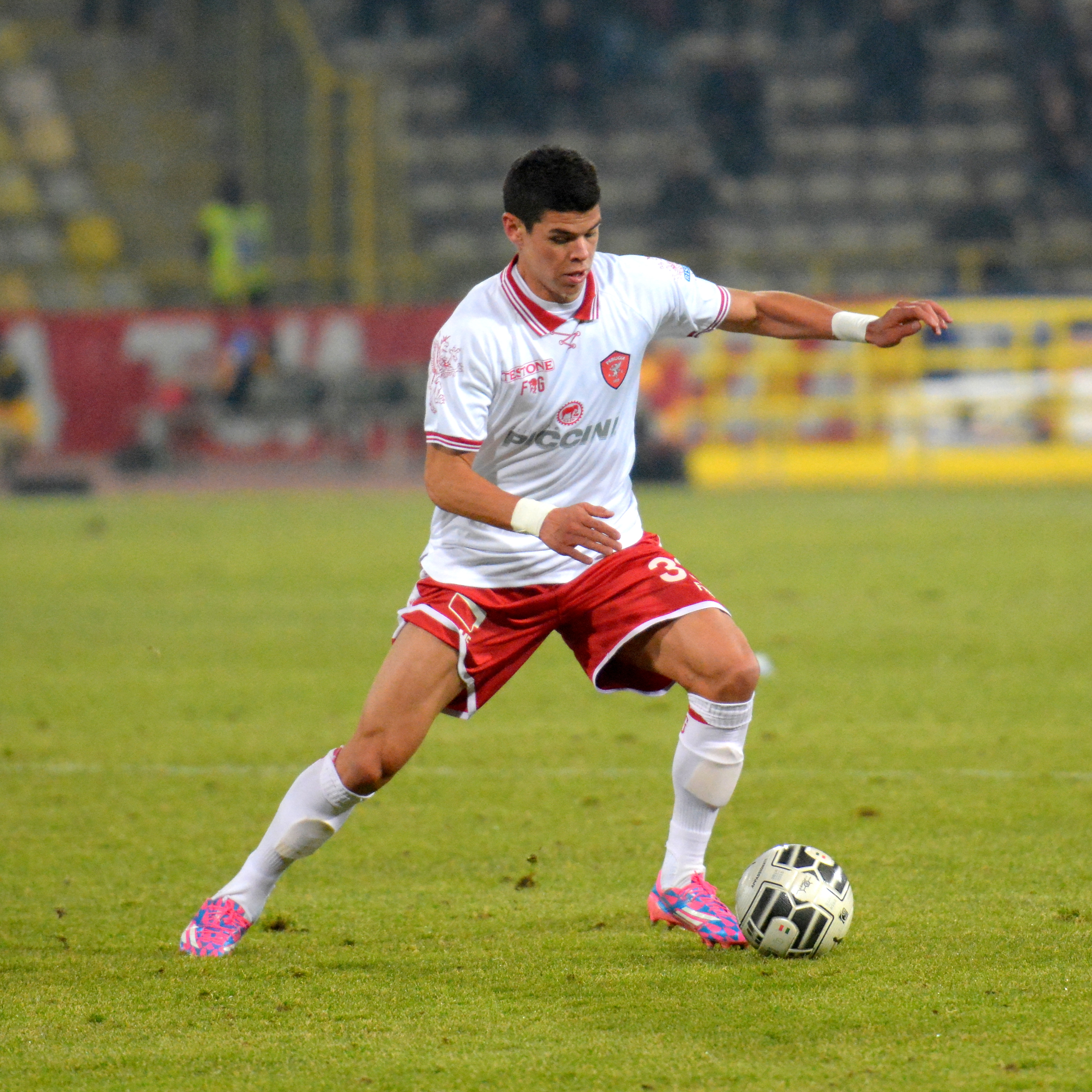

Personal information
- Full name: Vinícius de Freitas Ribeiro
- Date of birth: 7 March 1993 (age 33)
- Place of birth: Rio de Janeiro, Brazil
- Height: 1.83 m (6 ft 0 in)
- Position: Left-back

Team information
- Current team: Francavilla
- Number: 31

Youth career
- Fluminense
- 2009–2013: Cruzeiro

Senior career*
| Years | Team | Apps | (Gls) |
| 2012–2013 | Cruzeiro | 0 | (0) |
| 2013–2017 | Lazio | 2 | (0) |
| 2014 | → Padova (loan) | 10 | (1) |
| 2014–2015 | → Perugia (loan) | 15 | (0) |
| 2015–2016 | → FC Zürich (loan) | 24 | (0) |
| 2017–2018 | AEK Athens | 13 | (1) |
| 2018–2020 | Chapecoense | 17 | (0) |
| 2019 | → Botafogo-SP (loan) | 9 | (0) |
| 2021 | Joinville | 5 | (0) |
| 2022–2023 | Ħamrun Spartans | 14 | (0) |
| 2024– | Francavilla | 3 | (0) |

International career
| 2014 | Brazil U21 | 4 | (0) |
Medal record
Representing Brazil
Men's Football
Pan American Games
| Bronze medal – third place | 2015 Toronto | Team competition |
- * Club domestic league appearances and goals as of 17 November 2024

Vinícius de Freitas Ribeiro, commonly known as Vinícius Feitas, Vini or simply Vinícius (born 7 March 1993), is a Brazilian footballer who plays as a left-back for Italian Serie D club Francavilla.

== Career ==
Born in Rio de Janeiro, Vinícius started his youth career at Fluminense, but moved to Cruzeiro in October 2009. In September 2012 he was promoted to the latter's first team, but failed to make an appearance and was demoted back to the youth squad in January 2013.

On 5 July 2013 Vinícius moved to Serie A side Lazio on a free transfer. After only appearing on the bench for the Biancazzurri, he was loaned to Serie B side Padova until June.

On 15 March 2014 Vinícius made his professional debut, as a substitute in a 3–0 success at Varese.

Then on 28 August, he was again loaned out, this time to Perugia.

During the next campaign, Vinícius spent time on loan at Swiss Super League side Zurich, managing a total of 20 league appearances for the Swiss club, and a further four appearances in the 2015–16 Swiss Cup, as Der Stadtclub won 0–1 away to Lugano in the final of the Schweizer Cup.

=== AEK Athens ===
On 30 January 2017, AEK have agreed terms with Lazio left-back as they start negotiations with Lazio hoping to clinch a deal before the end of the January transfer window. Vinicius's contract runs out at the end of the season and AEK have already agreed terms with the Brazilian left-back. A day later he signed a 2,5 years contract with AEK for an undisclosed fee. On 6 April 2017 he opened the score in a 2–0 away win against Platanias, in which he also received the MVP award. The Brazilian didn't manage to impress coach Manolo Jiménez and eventually left the club, going to Chapecoense in the Brazilian league.

=== Brazil ===
In his first season with Chapecoense, Vinícius struggled to make an impact, competing for a spot with Bruno Pacheco and suffering an injury. He made 13 appearances across all competitions, four of which were in 2018 Campeonato Brasileiro Série A. In May 2019, having extended his contract with Chapecoense for two years, he signed on loan for Botafogo-SP until the end of the 2019 Campeonato Brasileiro Série B season.

== Honours ==
=== Club ===
FC Zürich

- Swiss Cup: 2015–16
