= Vasilios Lampropoulos =

Greek footballer (born 1990)

Vasilis Labropoulos
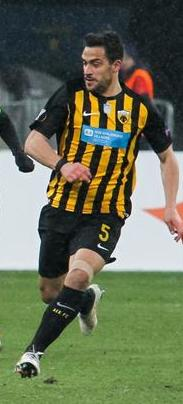
- Lampropoulos with AEK Athens in 2018

Personal information
- Full name: Vasilios Konstantinos Lampropoulos
- Date of birth: 31 March 1990 (age 36)
- Place of birth: Pyrgos, Greece
- Height: 1.85 m (6 ft 1 in)
- Position: Centre-back

Youth career
- 2004–2006: AE Chalandriou
- 2006–2008: Olympiacos

Senior career*
Years	Team	Apps	(Gls)
2007–2009	Olympiacos	0	(0)
2008–2009	→ Apollon Kalamarias (loan)	22	(1)
2009–2011	Asteras Tripolis	10	(0)
2011	→ Ilioupoli (loan)	14	(2)
2011–2012	Ethnikos Asteras	17	(1)
2012–2014	Panionios	39	(3)
2014–2019	AEK Athens	95	(4)
2019–2020	Deportivo La Coruña	17	(0)
2020	→ VfL Bochum (loan)	10	(0)
2020–2023	VfL Bochum	37	(0)
2023–2026	OFI	75	(6)

International career^{‡}
2006–2007	Greece U17	3	(0)
2007–2009	Greece U19	12	(0)
2010	Greece U21	1	(0)
2018–2020	Greece	5	(0)
- * Club domestic league appearances and goals as of 14 June 2026 ‡ National team caps and goals as of 12 November 2020

Vasiliοs Labropoulos (Greek: Βασίλειος Λαμπρόπουλος; born 31 March 1990) is a Greek professional footballer who plays as a centre-back.

== Club career ==
Labropoulos was born in Pyrgos on 31 March 1990, and he has played for Apollon Kalamarias, Asteras Tripolis, Ilioupoli, Ethnikos Asteras, and Panionios.

On 24 January 2014, Labropoulos decided to continue his career to AEK Athens in the Football League, starting the 2013–14 season.

On 8 April 2017, Labropoulos ruptured his anterior cruciate ligament in a Super League game against Platanias and underwent a successful surgery, while his comeback was estimated in around six months. In his day of surgery, Lampropoulos extended his contract with the Greek Cup winners by two years, despite being ruled out for six months with a knee injury. The 27-year-old's contract had been due to expire in the summer of 2017, but that has been stretched to 2019 by his club. Lampropoulos always had the desire to remain at AEK Athens and he was more than happy to commit his future to the club for the next two years.

On 12 April 2017, Labropoulos agreed to a contract extension with AEK, until the summer of 2019.

On 26 November 2018, despite the fact that he was a key figure for the club, following the Super League defeat from Panetolikos, AEK owner Dimitris Melissanidis engaged in a heated conversation with three players, ostracizing Lampropoulos, André Simões and Anastasios Bakasetas from the team. "For Simoes, Labropoulos and Bakasetas, who have not agreed to sign a new contract, we will search for options to allow them to leave in January". said the owner of the club. In his press conference ahead of the upcoming Champions League game against Ajax, head coach Marinos Ouzounidis practically confirmed that the trio would not be a part of his team anymore: "These guys have helped the team a lot, but since we talked and couldn’t reach an agreement, it’s probably best for the club to make a decision". Unless Lampropoulos, Simoes and Bakasetas all suddenly decided to pen a new deal with AEK, they would not play for the club again. Last season, a similar situation developed with goalkeeper Giannis Anestis, who was subsequently ostracized from the team after refusing to extend his contract.

On 27 June 2019, Deportivo La Coruña confirmed the signing of Labropoulos on a free transfer for the next two seasons. Deportivo missed out on promotion to La Liga, this year after losing to Mallorca in the playoffs.

On 31 January 2020, Labropoulos joined VfL Bochum on loan until the end of the 2019–20 season. On 14 August 2020, he has signed a two-year contract with VfL Bochum of the 2. Bundesliga. The 30-year-old centre-back had been on loan at Bochum from Deportivo during the second half of the previous campaign. On 15 December 2020, he faced a muscle injury in a game against Hannover 96 and he estimated to be in the injury list for at least four months. At the end of the season VfL Bochum were crowned champions of 2. Bundesliga and promoted to Bundesliga.

== International career ==
On 9 November 2018, Greece new coach Angelos Anastasiadis called up Labropoulos for the match against Finland and Estonia for UEFA Nations League. On 15 November 2018, he made his debut in a 1–0 home win game against Finland.

== Career statistics ==
=== Club ===
As of 5 July 2026

Appearances and goals by club, season and competition
Club	Season	League			Cup		Continental		Other		Total	
Club	Season	Division	Apps	Goals	Apps	Goals	Apps	Goals	Apps	Goals	Apps	Goals
Olympiacos	2007–08	Superleague Greece	0	0	1	0	0	0	—		1	0
Apollon Kalamarias (loan)	2008–09	Football League	22	1	1	0	—		—		23	1
Asteras Tripolis	2009–10	Superleague Greece	9	0	0	0	—		—		9	0
Asteras Tripolis	2010–11	Superleague Greece	1	0	0	0	—		—		1	0
Asteras Tripolis	Total		10	0	0	0	—		—		10	0
Ilioupoli (loan)	2010–11	Superleague Greece 2	14	2	0	0	—		—		14	2
Ethnikos Asteras	2011–12	Superleague Greece 2	17	1	2	0	—		—		19	1
Panionios	2012–13	Superleague Greece	9	2	0	0	—		—		9	2
Panionios	2013–14	Superleague Greece	30	1	6	0	—		—		36	1
Panionios	Total		39	3	6	0	—		—		45	3
AEK Athens	2014–15	Superleague Greece 2	17	2	8	1	—		7 (Note: Appearances in the 2014–15 Football League promotion play-offs)	0	32	3
AEK Athens	2015–16	Superleague Greece	19	0	9	0	—		2 (Note: Appearances in the 2015–16 Super League play-offs)	0	30	0
AEK Athens	2016–17	Superleague Greece	23	2	5	0	1	0	0 (Note: Appearances in the 2016–17 Super League play-offs)	0	29	2
AEK Athens	2017–18	Superleague Greece	19	0	7	0	2	0	—		28	0
AEK Athens	2018–19	Superleague Greece	8	0	1	0	7	0	—		16	0
AEK Athens	Total		86	4	30	1	10	0	9	0	135	5
Deportivo La Coruña	2019–20	Segunda División	17	0	1	0	—		—		18	0
VfL Bochum (loan)	2019–20	2. Bundesliga	10	0	0	0	—		—		10	0
Bochum	2020–21	2. Bundesliga	9	0	1	0	—		—		10	0
Bochum	2021–22	Bundesliga	13	0	2	0	—		—		15	0
Bochum	2022–23	Bundesliga	15	0	1	0	—		—		16	0
Bochum	Total		37	0	4	0	—		—		41	0
OFI	2023–24	Superleague Greece	21	2	4	0	—		—		25	2
OFI	2024–25	Superleague Greece	28	3	5	0	—		—		33	3
OFI	2025–26	Superleague Greece	25	1	6	1	—		1	0	32	2
OFI	Total		74	6	15	1	0	0	1	0	90	7
Career total			326	17	60	2	10	0	10	0	406	19

== Honours ==
Olympiacos

- Super League Greece: 2007–08
- Greek Cup: 2007–08
- Greek Super Cup: 2007

AEK Athens

- Super League Greece: 2017–18
- Football League: 2014–15 (South Group)
- Greek Cup: 2015–16

VfL Bochum

- 2. Bundesliga: 2020–21

OFI

- Greek Cup: 2025–26
