= Fotis Sotiropoulos =

Greek-born American engineering professor and university administrator (born 1963)

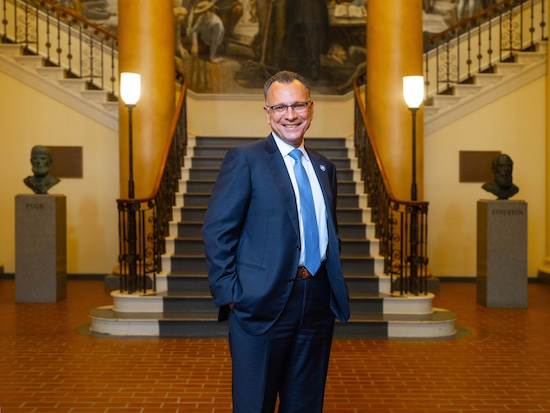
- Born: August 30, 1963 (age 63)
- Known for: Computational fluid dynamics for fluid structure interaction, river hydromechanics and morphodynamics, wind and tidal energy systems, aquatic swimming and heart valve hemodynamics
- Title: Executive Vice President and Provost

Academic background
- Education: National Technical University of Athens (BA) Pennsylvania State University (MS) University of Cincinnati (PhD)
- Website: https://scholar.google.com/citations?user=rfF1324AAAAJ&hl=en

Fotis Sotiropoulos (born August 30, 1963) is a Greek-born American engineering professor and university administrator known for his research contributions in computational fluid dynamics for river hydrodynamics, renewable energy, biomedical and biological applications. He currently serves as the Executive Vice President and Provost at the Pennsylvania State University, a position he has held since August 11, 2025.

== Biography ==
Born and raised in Athens, Greece, Sotiropoulos earned his Diploma in mechanical engineering from the National Technical University of Athens in Greece (1986). In 1987 he moved to the United States to pursue his graduate studies. He received a M.S. degree in aerospace engineering from the Pennsylvania State University (1989) and a Ph.D. in aerospace engineering and engineering mechanics from the University of Cincinnati (1991). From 1991 to 1995 he was a postdoctoral associate and assistant research scientist at the University of Iowa Institute for Hydraulic Research in Iowa City, IA.

== Career ==
Fotis Sotiropoulos serves as the Executive Vice President and Provost at the Pennsylvania State University, where he also holds a tenure appointment as professor in the Department of Mechanical Engineering. Prior to that, Sotiropoulos served as Provost and Senior Vice President of Academic Affairs at Virginia Commonwealth University (2021-2025), and as the Dean of the College of Engineering and Applied Sciences at Stony Brook University (2015-2021). From October 2020 to March 2021 he also served as Interim Provost and Senior Vice President for Academic Affairs at Stony Brook University. Sotiropoulos was also SUNY Distinguished Professor of Civil Engineering at Stony Brook University. Prior to that, Sotiropoulos served as the director of the St. Anthony Falls Laboratory, the founding director of the EOLOS wind energy research field station, and the James L. Record Professor of Civil, Environmental and Geo-Engineering at the University of Minnesota, Twin Cities (2006–2015). Prior to that, he was on the faculty of the School of Civil and Environmental Engineering at the Georgia Institute of Technology, with a joint appointment in the G. W. Woodruff School of Mechanical Engineering (1995–2005).

== Awards ==
2023: American Society of Mechanical Engineers (ASME) Fluids Engineering Award “For outstanding contributions to fluids engineering in the areas of turbulence, vortex dynamics, flow-structure interactions, and chaotic dynamics impacting the fields of mechanical, biological, biomedical, and civil engineering.”

2019: American Geophysical Union Hydrology Days Borland Lecture in Hydraulics

2018: Fellow of the American Society of Mechanical Engineers (ASME)

2017: State University of New York Distinguished Professor

2017: American Society of Civil Engineers Hunter-Rouse Hydraulic Engineering Award “For generating a quantum leap forward in the development and application of computational fluid dynamics for waterways.”

2014: Sackler Distinguished Lecturer, The Mortimer and Raymond Sackler Institute of Advanced Studies, Tel Aviv University, Israel

2011: APS/DF Gallery of Fluid Motion Contest Winner (with T. Le, D. Coffey, and D. Keefe), American Physical Society, 64st APS/DFD meeting, Baltimore, Maryland. Video entry: “Vortex formation and instability in the left ventricle”

2009: Fellow of the American Physical Society (APS): “For seminal contributions in vortex dynamics, flow-structure interactions, and chaotic dynamics in civil, mechanical and biomedical applications.”

2009: APS/DFD Gallery of Fluid Motion Contest Winner (with I. Borazjani), American Physical Society, 61st APS/DFD meeting, San Antonio, Texas. Video entry: “Why don't mackerels swim like eels? The role of form and kinematics on the hydrodynamics of undulatory swimming”

2008: James L. Record Professorship, Department of Civil Engineering, University of Minnesota

1999: Early CAREER Award from the National Science Foundation

== Research ==
Sotiropoulos has made seminal contributions in computational fluid dynamics (CFD), spanning a broad range of topics in turbulence, vortex dynamics, flow-structure interactions, and chaotic dynamics. His work has been inherently interdisciplinary and impacted numerous fields in civil engineering, mechanical engineering, biomedical engineering, and aquatic biology. He has developed the Curvilinear Immersed Boundary method for solving the Navier-Stokes equations in domains with arbitrarily complex deformable objects with fluid-structure interaction. His numerical methods have been integrated with novel experiments to enable high-fidelity numerical simulations of real-life fluid mechanics problems in areas such as wind and tidal energy systems, river hydromechanics and morphodynamics, fish swimming, and hemodynamics of native and prosthetic heart valves. Sotiropoulos is the developer of the open source Virtual Flow Simulator (VFS) CFD code, which is used by industry to optimize wind farms and tidal energy projects and assess and mitigate the risk of extreme river flooding on transportation infrastructure.
