= Fotis Koutzavasilis =

Greek footballer

Personal information
- Full name: Fotios Koutzavasilis
- Date of birth: 11 March 1989 (age 37)
- Place of birth: Serres, Greece
- Height: 1.85 m (6 ft 1 in)
- Position: Goalkeeper

Team information
- Current team: Chaniotis

Youth career
- PAOK

Senior career*
| Years | Team | Apps | (Gls) |
| 2008–2012 | PAOK | 1 | (0) |
| 2011–2012 | → Panserraikos (loan) | 12 | (0) |
| 2012–2013 | Panserraikos | 32 | (0) |
| 2013–2019 | Kerkyra | 108 | (0) |
| 2019–2022 | Chania | 68 | (0) |
| 2022–2023 | Iraklis Larissa | 5 | (0) |
| 2023 | Apollon Paralimnio | 0 | (0) |
| 2023–2024 | Keravnos Angelochori | | |
| 2024– | Chaniotis | | |
- * Club domestic league appearances and goals as of 10 January 2023

Fotis Koutzavasilis (Greek: Φώτης Κουτζαβασίλης; born 11 March 1989) is a Greek professional footballer who plays as a goalkeeper for Gamma Ethniki club Chaniotis.
