= 2013–14 Panathinaikos F.C. season =

Panathinaikos
2013–14 season
- Chairman: Giannis Alafouzos
- Manager: Giannis Anastasiou
- Stadium: Leoforos Alexandras Stadium
- Super League Greece: 4th (1st in Play-Offs)
- Greek Cup: Winners (18)
- Top goalscorer: League: Marcus Berg (15 goals); All: Marcus Berg (23 goals)
Home colours	Away colours	Third colours

The 2013–14 season was the Panathinaikos' 55th consecutive season in Super League Greece.

They also competed in the Greek Cup.

During the 2012–2013 season, Panathinaikos' president, Giannis Alafouzos, announced that there will be a major reduce at the teams budget because of the financial problems they had been facing. He also said, that the average wage of the players will not surpass 300.000 euros, except from one or two exceptions. Finally, He announced, that the previous season's largest contract, which is the contract of Jean-Alain Boumsong will not exist at the team and that some lower, but still too high for the next year's standards contracts, such as the contracts of Toché or Vitolo, a renew will be offered, but with a major reduce, bigger the 50%. Also, there are many players such as José Manuel Velázquez, Bruno Fornaroli and many others, who were informed by the team's head coach Giannis Anastasiou, that they were not in the coach's plans for the next season.

== Players ==
=== First-team squad ===
Squad at end of season

Note: Flags indicate national team as defined under FIFA eligibility rules; some limited exceptions apply. Players may hold more than one non-FIFA nationality.

No.	Pos.	Nation	Player
1	GK	GRE	Stefanos Kapino
2	DF	GRE	Panagiotis Spyropoulos
3	DF	GRE	Diamantis Chouchoumis
4	DF	GRE	Georgios Koutroumpis
5	DF	GRE	Konstantinos Triantafyllopoulos
6	MF	NED	David Mendes da Silva
7	FW	BEL	Viktor Klonaridis
8	MF	GRE	Tasos Lagos
9	FW	SWE	Marcus Berg
10	MF	GRE	Zeca (Captain)
11	MF	SWE	Emir Bajrami
12	DF	GRE	Nikos Marinakis
14	MF	NGR	Abdul Jeleel Ajagun
15	GK	GRE	Alexandros Tabakis
16	MF	GRE	Vasilis Angelopoulos
17	FW	GRE	Alexandros Mouzakitis
18	MF	GRE	Christos Donis
19	FW	GRE	Nikolaos Karelis

No.	Pos.	Nation	Player
20	MF	ALG	Mehdi Abeid
21	DF	ESP	Nano
22	FW	URU	Adrián Balboa
23	DF	CRO	Gordon Schildenfeld
24	DF	GRE	Spyros Risvanis
25	GK	GRE	Stefanos Kotsolis
26	FW	GRE	Thanasis Dinas
27	MF	GRE	Vangelis Anastasopoulos
28	MF	GRE	Giannis Stamatakis
29	FW	GRE	Nikos Giannitsanis
30	FW	GRE	Konstantinos Apostolopoulos
32	MF	CRO	Danijel Pranjić
33	FW	CRO	Mladen Petrić
35	GK	GRE	Alexandros Anagnostopoulos
39	FW	ARG	Luciano Figueroa
41	DF	POR	André Pinto
44	DF	VEN	José Manuel Velázquez
61	MF	GHA	Quincy Owusu-Abeyie

== Transfers ==
=== In ===
Squad #	Position	Player	Transferred From	Fee	Date	Source
11	MF	(Sweden) Emir Bajrami	(Netherlands) Twente	Free	1 July 2013	
6	MF	(Netherlands) Mendes da Silva	(Austria) Red Bull Salzburg	Free	4 July 2013	
9	FW	(Sweden) Marcus Berg	(Germany) Hamburger SV	Free	8 July 2013	
4	DF	(Greece) Georgios Koutroumpis	(Greece) AEK Athens	Free	17 July 2013	
19	FW	(Greece) Nikolaos Karelis	(Russia) Amkar Perm	65.000 €	30 July 2013	
20	MF	(Algeria) Mehdi Abeid	(England) Newcastle United	Loan	30 July 2013	
21	DF	(Spain) Nano	(Spain) Ponferradina	Free	1 August 2013	
23	DF	(Croatia) Gordon Schildenfeld	(Russia) Dynamo Moscow	Loan	2 August 2013	
14	MF	(Nigeria) Abdul Jeleel Ajagun	(Nigeria) Dolphins F.C.	200.000 €	28 August 2013	
32	MF	(Croatia) Danijel Pranjić	(Portugal) Sporting CP	Free	2 September 2013	
7	FW	(Belgium) Viktor Klonaridis	(France) Lille	Free	2 September 2013	
22	FW	(Uruguay) Adrián Balboa	(Uruguay) Club Sportivo Cerrito	Loan	2 September 2013	
33	FW	(Croatia) Mladen Petrić	Free agent	Free	8 January 2014	

Total spending: ▼265.000 €

=== Promoted from youth system ===
Squad #	Position	Player	Date	Signed Until	Source
24	DF	(Greece) Spyros Risvanis	30 July 2013	30 July 2016	
35	GK	(Greece) Alexandros Anagnostopoulos	30 July 2013	30 July 2015	
27	MF	(Greece) Vaggelis Anastasopoulos	30 July 2013	30 July 2015	
	GK	(Greece) Nestoras Gekas	13 March 2014	30 June 2016	
	GK	(Greece) Stefanos Kotsaris	13 March 2014	30 June 2016	
	DF	(Greece) Dimitris Myrthianos	13 March 2014	30 June 2016	
	DF	(Greece) Marios Tzanoulinos	13 March 2014	30 June 2016	
	MF	(Greece) Dimitris Aggelopoulos	13 March 2014	30 June 2016	
	MF	(Greece) Paschalis Staikos	13 March 2014	30 June 2016	
	FW	(Greece) Michail Peter Niouman	13 March 2014	30 June 2016	
	FW	(Greece) Lazaros Lamprou	13 March 2014	30 June 2016	
	FW	(Albania) Maldin Ymeraj	13 March 2014	30 June 2016	

=== Out ===
Squad #	Position	Player	Transferred To	Fee	Date	Source
3	FW	(Ivory Coast) Ibrahim Sissoko	(Germany) Wolfsburg	End of loan	1 July 2013	
2	DF	(Netherlands) Nicky Kuiper	(Netherlands) Twente	End of loan	1 July 2013	
49	MF	(Japan) Yohei Kajiyama	(Japan) FC Tokyo	End of loan	1 July 2013	
21	FW	(New Zealand) Kosta Barbarouses	(Russia) Alania Vladikavkaz	End of loan	1 July 2013	
12	MF	(Spain) Jokin Arcaya	Free agent	End of Contract	1 July 2013	
34	MF	(Greece) Spyros Fourlanos	(Belgium) Club Brugge	340.000 €	1 July 2013	
22	DF	(Greece) Stergos Marinos	(Belgium) Charleroi	End of Contract	1 July 2013	
16	DF	(Greece) Giourkas Seitaridis	Free agent	End of Contract	1 July 2013	
4	DF	(France) Jean-Alain Boumsong	Free agent	Termination of Contract	1 July 2013	
27	GK	(Greece) Orestis Karnezis	(Italy) Udinese	900.000 €	23 July 2013	
7	MF	(Greece) Charis Mavrias	(England) Sunderland	4.000.000 €	22 August 2013	
14	FW	(Uruguay) Bruno Fornaroli	(Uruguay) Danubio	Termination of Contract	2 September 2013	
6	MF	(Spain) Vitolo	(Turkey) Elazığspor	Termination of Contract	5 September 2013	
20	MF	(Senegal) Pape Sow	(Turkey) Elazığspor	Free	5 September 2013	
44	DF	(Venezuela) José Manuel Velázquez	Free agent	Termination of Contract	11 November 2013	
39	FW	(Argentina) Luciano Figueroa	(Malaysia) Johor Darul Takzim F.C.	750.000 €	2 December 2013	
41	DF	(Portugal) André Almeida Pinto	(Portugal) Braga	Termination of Contract	3 December 2013	
9	FW	(Spain) Toché	(Spain) Deportivo de La Coruña	Termination of Contract	9 December 2013	
45	FW	(Ghana) Quincy Owusu-Abeyie	Free agent	Termination of Contract	17 December 2013	
31	MF	(Greece) Nikos Kousidis	(Greece) Aris	Termination of Contract	3 January 2014	
30	FW	(Greece) Konstantinos Apostolopoulos	(Greece) Panachaiki	Loan	23 January 2014	

Total income: ▲5.990.000 €

Expenditure: ▲5.725.000 €

== Pre-season and friendlies ==
4 July 2013 Friendly	Presikhaaf	1–6	Panathinaikos	Arnhem, Netherlands
18:00 (17:00 local)	Van der Hord 58'	Report	Kousidis 5'; Zeca 22'; Apostolopoulos 53'; Bajrami 62', 75'; Stamatakis 87'	Stadium: Schuytgraaf

8 July 2013 Friendly	Panathinaikos	0–2	Anorthosis Famagusta	Arnhem, Netherlands
20:00 (19:00 local)		Report	Andić 49'; Theodorou 75'	Stadium: Schuytgraaf

10 July 2013 Friendly	Panathinaikos	1–2	Gent	Arnhem, Netherlands
20:00 (19:00 local)	Giannitsanis 68'	Report	Diogo 37'; Zukanović 51'	Stadium: Schuytgraaf

21 July 2013 Friendly	Iraklis Psachna	0–2	Panathinaikos	Psachna, Greece
19:30		Report	Donis 27'; Triantafyllopoulos 86'	Stadium: Psachna Municipal Stadium

24 July 2013 Friendly	Elazığspor	4–4	Panathinaikos	Tegelen, Venlo, Netherlands
19:00 (18:00 local)	Sane 19'; Özkan 22', 36'; Zeegelaar 58'	Report	Kousidis 6'; Dinas 16'; Giannitsanis 54', 74'	Stadium: SC Irene Stadium

27 July 2013 Friendly	Valenciennes	4–0	Panathinaikos	Valenciennes, France
19:00 (18:00 local)	da Silva 15'; Dossevi 18'; David Mendes da Silva 26' (o.g.); José Saez 76'	Report		Stadium: Stade du Hainaut

4 August 2013 Friendly	Panathinaikos	0–0	Lazio	Athens, Greece
		Report		Stadium: Leoforos Alexandras Stadium; Attendance: 12,136

10 August 2013 Friendly	Norwich City	2–0	Panathinaikos	Norwich, England
17:00 (15:00 local)	Johnson 4', 59'	Report		Stadium: Carrow Road

8 September 2013 Friendly	Panachaiki	2–1	Panathinaikos	Patras, Greece
	12' Sitoe; 30' Bozic	Report	93' (o.g.) Villarejo	Stadium: Pampeloponnisiako Stadium

== Competitions ==
=== Super League Greece ===
==== Regular season ====
===== League table =====
Pos	Team	Pld	W	D	L	GF	GA	GD	Pts	Qualification or relegation
2	PAOK	34	21	6	7	68	37	+31	69	Qualification for the Play-offs
3	Atromitos	34	19	9	6	54	25	+29	66 (Note: Head-to-head points: Atromitos 4, Panathinaikos 1.)	Qualification for the Play-offs
4	Panathinaikos	34	20	6	8	57	28	+29	66	Qualification for the Play-offs
5	Asteras Tripolis	34	16	10	8	46	35	+11	58	Qualification for the Play-offs
6	OFI	34	11	11	12	30	39	−9	44 (Note: Head-to-head points: OFI 4, Ergotelis 1.)	

Source: Super League Greece
Rules for classification: 1) Points; 2) Head-to-head points; 3) Head-to-head goal difference; 4) Goals scored; 5) Goals against; 6) Play-offs (neutral ground).
(Note: Criteria 6 is only used if needed to decide champion, teams for relegation or teams for UEFA competitions).
If in final league table there are still tied teams after applying criteria 1 to 5, a decision match (or matches if they are more than two) are to be played but only in three cases: to determine the champion, to fill spots in the play-off or to determine the teams to be relegated. In any other case, the final standings of tied teams are determined with a public draw.

===== Matches =====
18 August 2013 1	Panathinaikos	2–0	Panetolikos	Ampelokipoi
21:30	Nano 3' (pen.); Berg 65'	Report; Live TV:	Darlas (red card) 50'	Stadium: Leoforos Alexandras Stadium; Attendance: 11,834; Referee: Praxitelis Zachariadis; Man of the Match: Georgios Koutroumpis

24 August 2013 2	Panionios	3–0	Panathinaikos	Athens
21:30	Aravidis 40', 88'; Kolovos 71' (yellow card) 72'	Report	Lagos (yellow card) 36'; Zeca (yellow card) 68'; Mendes da Silva (yellow card) 84' (red card)	Stadium: Nea Smyrni Stadium; Attendance: 1,998; Referee: Dimitris Styliaras

31 August 2013 3	Panathinaikos	1–1	Veria	Ampelokipoi
21:30	Zeca (yellow card) 25'; Mehdi Abeid 44'; Marinakis (yellow card) 90'; Triantafyllopoulos (yellow card) 90+4'	Report	N.Georgiadis (yellow card) 39'; Ben Nabouhane 54'; Ostojić (yellow card) 58'	Stadium: Leoforos Alexandras Stadium; Attendance: 8,615; Referee: Christos Mitsios; Man of the Match: Anastasios Lagos

15 September 2013 4	Platanias	1–1	Panathinaikos	Chania
20:30	45+1' Nazlidis	Report	Ajagun 82'	Stadium: Perivolia Municipal Stadium; Referee: Giorgos Kominis

21 September 2013 5	Panathinaikos	1–0	OFI	Ampelokipoi
20:30	Berg 65'	Report		Stadium: Leoforos Alexandras Stadium; Attendance: 8,454; Referee: Giorgos Daskalalopoulos; Man of the Match: Marcus Berg

29 September 2013 6	Panathinaikos	2–1	Asteras Tripolis	Ampelokipoi
20:30	Berg 59'; Figueroa 76'	Report	De Blasis 60'	Stadium: Leoforos Alexandras Stadium; Attendance: 10,090; Referee: Andreas Pappas; Man of the Match: Marcus Berg

6 October 2013 7	PAOK	2–1	Panathinaikos	Thessaloniki
20:30	Stoch 27' (pen.); Athanasiadis 48'	Report	Berg 21'	Stadium: Toumba Stadium; Referee: Dimitris Thanos

20 October 2013 8	Panathinaikos	1–2	Panthrakikos	Ampelokipoi
20:30	Figueroa 67'	Report	Zequinha 18'; Romeu 75'	Stadium: Leoforos Alexandras Stadium; Attendance: 9,156

26 October 2013 9	Ergotelis	0–2	Panathinaikos	Heraklion
19:30		Report	Figueroa 83'; Koutroumpis 90+3'	Stadium: Pankritio Stadium; Referee: Giannis Topouzis

2 November 2013 10	Panathinaikos	0–1	Olympiacos	Ampelokipoi
19:30		Report	Mitroglou 90'	Stadium: Leoforos Alexandras Stadium; Attendance: 15,009; Referee: Stavros Mantalos

9 November 2013 11	Aris	0–2	Panathinaikos	Thessaloniki
19:30		Report	Klonaridis 43', 69'	Stadium: Kleanthis Vikelidis Stadium; Referee: Anastasios Kakos

24 November 2013 12	Panathinaikos	3–1	PAS Giannina	Ampelokipoi
15:00	Berg 33'; Karelis 83', 90+1'	Report	Ilić 51'	Stadium: Leoforos Alexandras Stadium; Referee: Georgios Liahoudis

30 November 2013 13	Apollon Smyrnis	1–1	Panathinaikos	Athens
19:30	Panteliadis 48'	Report	Berg 6'	Stadium: Georgios Kamaras Stadium; Referee: Praxitelis Zachariadis

8 December 2013 14	AEL Kalloni	0–4	Panathinaikos	Athens
19:30	Marcelo Goianira (yellow card) 83' (red card)	Report	Pranjić 29', 67'; Berg 43'; Abeid 90+2'	Stadium: Olympic Stadium

14 December 2013 15	Panathinaikos	1–2	Atromitos	Ampelokipoi
19:30	Berg 42'	Report	Iglesias 60', 65'	Stadium: Leoforos Alexandras Stadium; Attendance: 9,120

18 December 2013 16	Levadiakos	0–4	Panathinaikos	Livadeia
19:30		Report	Klonaridis 31'; Lagos 37', 52'; Donis 89'	Stadium: Levadia Municipal Stadium

22 December 2013 17	Panathinaikos	2–1	Skoda Xanthi	Ampelokipoi
19:30	Abeid 20', 54'	Report	Triadis 13'	Stadium: Leoforos Alexandras Stadium; Attendance: 8,314

5 January 2014 18	Panetolikos	1–0	Panathinaikos	Agrinio
15:00	Camara 29'	Report		Stadium: Panetolikos Stadium; Referee: Anastasios Kakos

11 January 2014 19	Panathinaikos	1–0	Panionios	Ampelokipoi
19:30	Pranjić 16'	Report		Stadium: Leoforos Alexandras Stadium; Attendance: 7,658

19 January 2014 20	Veria	1–3	Panathinaikos	Veria
19:30	Ben Nabouhane 10'	Report	Klonaridis 2'; Ajagun 34'; Berg 68'	Stadium: Veria Stadium

25 January 2014 21	Panathinaikos	1–0	Platanias	Ampelokipoi
19:30	Abeid 40'	Report		Stadium: Leoforos Alexandras Stadium; Attendance: 5,770

1 February 2014 22	OFI	1–1	Panathinaikos	Heraklion
19:30	Zé Eduardo 86'	Report	Klonaridis 40'	Stadium: Theodoros Vardinogiannis Stadium

5 February 2014 23	Asteras Tripolis	1–0	Panathinaikos	Tripoli
19:30	Carrasco 53'	Report		Stadium: Kolokotronis Stadium

9 February 2014 24	Panathinaikos	2–1	PAOK	Ampelokipoi
19:30	Triantafyllopoulos 47'; 58' Nano	Report	Athanasiadis 90'	Stadium: Leoforos Alexandras Stadium; Attendance: 11,113

16 February 2014 25	Panthrakikos	0–2	Panathinaikos	Komotini
19:30		Report	Karelis 27'; Ajagun 59'	Stadium: Komotini Municipal Stadium

23 February 2014 26	Panathinaikos	1–1	Ergotelis	Ampelokipoi
15:00	Pranjić 19'	Report	Badibanga 48'	Stadium: Leoforos Alexandras Stadium; Attendance: 8,702

2 March 2014 27	Olympiacos	0–3	Panathinaikos	Piraeus
19:30		Report	Pranjić 45'; Berg 67'; Abeid 89'	Stadium: Karaiskakis Stadium; Referee: Tasos Sidiropoulos; Man of the Match: Marcus Berg

8 March 2014 28	Panathinaikos	4–1	Aris	Ampelokipoi
19:30	Berg 26', 56', 74'; Klonaridis 45'	Report	Manias 40'	Stadium: Leoforos Alexandras Stadium; Attendance: 11,187

16 March 2014 29	PAS Giannina	0–1	Panathinaikos	Ioannina
15:00		Report	Ajagun 36'	Stadium: Zosimades Stadium

22 March 2014 30	Panathinaikos	3–1	Apollon Smyrnis	Ampelokipoi
19:30	Berg 33', 86'; Panteliadis 90' (o.g.)	Report	Ambrose 80'	Stadium: Leoforos Alexandras Stadium; Attendance: 7,957; Referee: Charalambos Kalogeropoulos

26 March 2014 31	Panathinaikos	3–0	AEL Kalloni	Ampelokipoi
19:30	Dinas 14'; Karelis 44'; Vallios 71' (o.g.)	Report		Stadium: Leoforos Alexandras Stadium; Attendance: 6,233; Referee: Stauros Tritsonis

29 March 2014 32	Atromitos	0–0	Panathinaikos	Peristeri
19:30		Report		Stadium: Peristeri Stadium

6 April 2014 33	Panathinaikos	3–1	Levadiakos	Ampelokipoi
19:00	Koutroumpis 39'; Karelis 63'; Abeid 77'	Report	Koné 41'	Stadium: Leoforos Alexandras Stadium; Attendance: 5,985

13 April 2014 34	Skoda Xanthi	3–1	Panathinaikos	Xanthi
19:00	Solari 18' (pen.), 22'; Mantalos 51'	Report	Klonaridis 31'	Stadium: Skoda Xanthi Arena

==== UEFA play-offs ====
===== League table =====
Pos	Team	Pld	W	D	L	GF	GA	GD	Pts	Qualification
2	Panathinaikos	6	2	3	1	7	5	+2	11	Qualification for the Champions League third qualifying round (Note: Panathinaikos won the 2013–14 Greek Football Cup against PAOK, so all of the Europa League berths are reverted into play-off positions.)
3	PAOK	6	3	2	1	8	4	+4	10	Qualification for the Europa League play-off round
4	Atromitos	6	1	2	3	6	9	−3	7 (Note: Head-to-head record: Asteras Tripolis–Atromitos 1–0, Atromitos–Asteras Tripolis 3–1.)	Qualification for the Europa League third qualifying round
5	Asteras Tripolis	6	2	1	3	5	8	−3	7	Qualification for the Europa League second qualifying round

Source: Super League Greece: Standings and Schedule
Rules for classification: 1) points; 2) head-to-head points; 3) head-to-head goal difference; 4) away goals rule; 5) classification of regular season

===== Matches =====
30 April 2014 1	Atromitos	1–1	Panathinaikos	Athens
17:00	Tavlaridis 56'		Abeid 18'	Stadium: Peristeri Stadium; Referee: Stavros Tritsonis

4 May 2014 2	Panathinaikos	1–1	PAOK	Ampelokipoi
20:30	Petrić 20'		Salpingidis 86'	Stadium: Leoforos Alexandras Stadium; Referee: Dimitris Pappas

7 May 2014 3	Asteras Tripolis	1–3	Panathinaikos	Tripoli
20:30	Usero 72'		Klonaridis 29'; Abeid 56'; Lagos 76'	Stadium: Theodoros Kolokotronis Stadium; Referee: Charis Kalogeropoulos

11 May 2014 4	Panathinaikos	1–0	Asteras Tripolis	Ampelokipoi
18:15	Berg 50'			Stadium: Leoforos Alexandras Stadium; Referee: Dimitris Thanos

14 May 2014 5	Panathinaikos	1–1	Atromitos	Ampelokipoi
19:15	Klonaridis 33'		Napoleoni 85'	Stadium: Leoforos Alexandras Stadium; Referee: Thanasis Giachos

17 May 2014 6	PAOK	1–0	Panathinaikos	Thessaloniki
20:30	Vukić 57'			Stadium: Toumba Stadium

=== Greek Cup ===
==== Second round ====
25 September 2013 First leg	Panathinaikos	2–1	Ergotelis	Ampelokipoi
20:30	Klonaridis 41'; Schildenfeld 90'	Report	Diamantakos 59'	Stadium: Leoforos Alexandras Stadium; Referee: Giorgos Liachoudis (Macedonia)

30 October 2013 Second leg	Ergotelis	0–1 (1–3 agg.)	Panathinaikos	Heraklion
18:00		Report	Berg 49'	Stadium: Pankritio Stadium; Referee: Giorgos Kominis (Thesprotia)

==== Third round ====
5 December 2013 First leg	Panathinaikos	3–0	Iraklis Psachna	Ampelokipoi
20:00	Donis 34'; Klonaridis 57'; Karelis 59'	Report		Stadium: Leoforos Alexandras Stadium; Referee: Giannis Delfakis (Arcadia)

15 January 2014 Second leg	Iraklis Psachna	0–1 (0–4 agg.)	Panathinaikos	Psachna, Euboea
17:00		Report	Ajagun 71'	Stadium: Psachna Municipal Stadium; Referee: Alexandros Dimitropoulos (Phthiotis)

==== Quarter-finals ====
29 January 2014 First leg	Panathinaikos	4–0	Olympiacos Volos	Ampelokipoi
18:00	48' Ajagun; Bajrami 57'; Berg 73'; Karelis 89'	Report		Stadium: Leoforos Alexandras Stadium; Referee: Michael Koukoulakis (Heraklion)

12 February 2014 Second leg	Olympiacos Volos	1–0 (1–4 agg.)	Panathinaikos	Volos
17:00	Kapetanos 72'	Report		Stadium: Volos Municipal Stadium; Referee: Stefanos Mandakis (Imathia)

==== Semi-finals ====
19 March 2014 First leg	OFI	1–0	Panathinaikos	Heraklion
19:00	Papazoglou 69'	Report		Stadium: Theodoros Vardinogiannis Stadium; Referee: Andreas Pappas (Athens)

16 April 2014 Second leg	Panathinaikos	3–0 (a.e.t.) (3–1 agg.)	OFI	Ampelokipoi
17:00	Abeid 20'; Berg 96', 115' (pen.)	Report		Stadium: Leoforos Alexandras Stadium; Attendance: 16,003; Referee: Anastasios Sidiropoulos (Dodecanese)

==== Final ====
26 April 2014	Panathinaikos	4–1	PAOK	Athens
20:00	Berg 15', 50', 88'; Karelis 54'	Report	Vukić 70' (pen.)	Stadium: Olympic Stadium; Attendance: 44,356; Referee: Tassos Kakos (Corfu)

== Top goalscorers ==
Rank	Player	Position	Super League Greece	Greek Cup	Greek Playoffs	Total
1	(Sweden) Marcus Berg	CF	15	7	1	23
2	(Belgium) Viktor Klonaridis	RW	7	2	2	11
2	(Algeria) Mehdi Abeid	CM	7	1	2	10
2	(Greece) Nikolaos Karelis	CF	5	3	0	8
4	(Nigeria) Abdul Jeleel Ajagun	CM	4	2	0	6
5	(Croatia) Danijel Pranjić	CM	5	0	0	5
6	(Argentina) Luciano Figueroa	CF	3	0	0	3
6	(Greece) Anastasios Lagos	CM	2	0	1	3
7	(Greece) Georgios Koutroumpis	CB	2	0	0	2
7	(Spain) Nano	LB	2	0	0	2
7	(Greece) Christos Donis	CM	1	1	0	2
8	(Greece) Thanasis Dinas	LW	1	0	0	1
8	(Greece) Konstantinos Triantafyllopoulos	CB	1	0	0	1
8	(Croatia) Gordon Schildenfeld	CB	0	1	0	1
8	(Sweden) Emir Bajrami	RW	0	1	0	1
8	(Croatia) Mladen Petrić	CF	0	0	1	1
Own goals	(Greece) Athanasios Panteliadis (Apollon Smyrnis)	LB	1	0	0	1
Own goals	(Greece) Stratis Vallios (AEL Kalloni)	CB	1	0	0	1
Total			57	18	7	82

== Season statistics (only official games have included) ==
From	To	Record								
From	To	N	W	D	L	GF	GA	GD	Win %	Ref.
1 July 2013	30 June 2014	49	29	9	11	82	37	+45	59.18	
