= 2014–15 Panathinaikos F.C. season =

Panathinaikos
2014–15 season
- Chairman: Giannis Alafouzos
- Manager: Yannis Anastasiou
- Stadium: Leoforos Alexandras Stadium
- Super League Greece: 2nd (1st in Play-Offs)
- Greek Cup: Third round
- UEFA Champions League: Third qualifying round
- UEFA Europa League: Group stage
- Top goalscorer: League: Marcus Berg; Nikos Karelis (13 goals each); All: Marcus Berg (22 goals)
Home colours	Away colours	Third colours

The 2014–15 season is the Panathinaikos' 56th consecutive season in Super League Greece.

They are also competing in the Greek Cup, UEFA Champions League and in the UEFA Europa League.

== Players ==
No.	Name	Nationality	Position (s)	Date of birth (age)	Signed from	Notes
Goalkeepers
1	Stefanos Kotsolis	(Greece)	GK	5 June 1979 (35)	(Cyprus) Omonia	
15	Luke Steele	(England)	GK	24 September 1984 (29)	(England) Barnsley	
35	Alexandros Anagnostopoulos	(Greece)	GK	18 August 1994 (20)	Youth system	
61	Konstantinos Kotsaris	(Greece)	GK	25 July 1996 (18)	Youth system	
Defenders
2	Panagiotis Spyropoulos	(Greece)	RB	21 August 1992 (21)	(Greece) Panionios	
3	Diamantis Chouchoumis	(Greece)	LB / LM	17 July 1994 (20)	Youth system	
4	Georgios Koutroumpis	(Greece)	CB	10 February 1991 (23)	(Greece) AEK Athens	
5	Konstantinos Triantafyllopoulos	(Greece)	CB	3 April 1993 (21)	Youth system	
12	Nikos Marinakis	(Greece)	RB	12 September 1993 (21)	Youth system	
20	Efstathios Tavlaridis	(Greece)	CB	25 January 1980 (34)	(Greece) Atromitos	
21	Nano	(Spain)	LB / LM	27 October 1984 (29)	(Spain) Ponferradina	
23	Gordon Schildenfeld	(Croatia)	CB	18 March 1985 (29)	(Russia) Dynamo Moscow	
31	Christos Bourbos	(Greece)	RB	1 June 1983 (31)	(Greece) OFI Crete	
Midfielders
6	David Mendes da Silva	(Netherlands)	DM	4 August 1982 (31)	(Austria) Red Bull Salzburg	
8	Anastasios Lagos	(Greece)	DM/CM	12 April 1992 (22)	Youth system	
10	Zeca	(Greece)	CM/AM	31 August 1988 (25)	(Portugal) Vitória de Setúbal	
11	Emir Bajrami	(Sweden)	RW/LW	7 March 1988 (26)	(France) AS Monaco FC	
14	Abdul Jeleel Ajagun	(Nigeria)	RW / AM / LW	10 February 1993 (21)	(Nigeria) Dolphins	
16	Vasilis Angelopoulos	(Greece)	DM / CM	12 February 1997 (19)	Youth system	
18	Christos Donis	(Greece)	CM	9 October 1994 (19)	Youth system	
22	Ouasim Bouy	(Morocco)	AM	11 June 1993 (21)	(Italy) Juventus	
27	Charalampos Mavrias	(Greece)	RW	21 February 1994 (21)	(England) Sunderland	
28	Giannis Stamatakis	(Greece)	CM	26 June 1994 (20)	Youth system	
29	Sotiris Ninis	(Greece)	AM	3 April 1990 (age 24)	Free agent	
32	Danijel Pranjić	(Croatia)	LM / LB	2 December 1981 (32)	(Portugal) Sporting CP	
Forwards
7	Viktor Klonaridis	(Belgium)	RW / AM / LW	28 July 1992 (22)	(France) Lille	
9	Marcus Berg	(Sweden)	CF	17 August 1986 (27)	(Germany) Hamburger SV	
17	Valmir Berisha	(Sweden)	CF	6 June 1996 (18)	(Italy) Roma	
19	Nikos Karelis	(Greece)	LW/RW / CF	24 February 1992 (22)	(Russia) Amkar Perm	
26	Thanasis Dinas	(Greece)	RW/LW	12 November 1989 (24)	(Greece) Panachaiki	
33	Mladen Petrić	(Croatia)	CF	1 January 1981 (33)	(England) West Ham United	

== Transfers ==
=== In ===
Squad #	Position	Player	Transferred from	Fee	Date	Source
30	FW	(Greece) Konstantinos Apostolopoulos	(Greece) Panachaiki	Return from Loan	30 June 2014	
15	GK	(England) Luke Steele	(England) Barnsley	Free	18 July 2014	
23	DF	(Croatia) Gordon Schildenfeld	(Russia) Dynamo Moscow	Loan	21 July 2014	
31	DF	(Greece) Christos Bourbos	(Greece) OFI Crete	Free	24 July 2014	
22	MF	(Morocco) Ouasim Bouy	(Italy) Juventus	Loan	29 July 2014	
17	FW	(Sweden) Valmir Berisha	(Italy) Roma	Loan	27 August 2014	
29	MF	(Greece) Sotiris Ninis	Free agent	Free	1 January 2015	
20	DF	(Greece) Efstathios Tavlaridis	(Greece) Atromitos	Free	1 January 2015	
	DF	(Greece) Nikos Marinakis	(Greece) Niki Volos	Return from loan	1 January 2015	
	MF	(Greece) Alexandros Mouzakitis	(Greece) Niki Volos	Return from loan	1 January 2015	
	FW	(Greece) Nikos Giannitsanis	(Greece) Niki Volos	Return from loan	1 January 2015	
	GK	(Greece) Alexandros Tabakis	(Greece) Niki Volos	Return from loan	1 January 2015	
	MF	(Greece) Vangelis Anastasopoulos	(Greece) Niki Volos	Return from loan	1 January 2015	
27	MF	(Greece) Charalampos Mavrias	(England) Sunderland	Loan	2 February 2015	

Total spending: €0

=== Out ===
Squad #	Position	Player	Transferred To	Fee	Date	Source
	MF	(Algeria) Mehdi Abeid	(England) Newcastle United	End of loan	30 June 2014	
	FW	(Uruguay) Adrián Balboa	(Uruguay) Club Sportivo Cerrito	End of loan	30 June 2014	
	DF	(Croatia) Gordon Schildenfeld	(Russia) Dynamo Moscow	End of loan	30 June 2014	
	MF	(Greece) Alexandros Mouzakitis	(Greece) Niki Volos	Loan	3 July 2014	
	FW	(Greece) Nikos Giannitsanis	(Greece) Niki Volos	Loan	9 July 2014	
	GK	(Greece) Stefanos Kapino	(Germany) Mainz 05	€2,200,000	18 July 2014	
	GK	(Greece) Alexandros Tabakis	(Greece) Niki Volos	Loan	20 July 2014	
	MF	(Greece) Evangelos Anastasopoulos	(Greece) Niki Volos	Loan	20 July 2014	
	DF	(Greece) Nikos Marinakis	(Greece) Niki Volos	Loan	7 August 2014	
	GK	(Greece) Nestoras Gekas	(Greece) Fostiras	Loan	12 August 2014	
	FW	(Greece) Konstantinos Apostolopoulos	(Belgium) Union	Free	29 August 2014	
	CB	(Greece) Spyros Risvanis	(Greece) Panionios	Loan	2 January 2015	
	FW	(Greece) Nikos Giannitsanis	(Greece) Lamia	Free	21 January 2015	
	FW	(Greece) Alexandros Mouzakitis	(Greece) Panionios	Free	26 January 2015	
	MF	(Greece) Evangelos Anastasopoulos	(Greece) Lamia	Free	26 January 2015	
	GK	(Greece) Alexandros Tabakis	(Netherlands) VVV-Venlo	Loan	2 February 2015	

Total income: ▲€2,200,000

Expenditure: ▲€2,200,000

== Pre-season and friendlies ==
9 July 2014 Friendly	Arka Gdynia	0–1	Panathinaikos	Gdynia, Poland
19:00		Report	Petrić 37'	Stadium: Stadion GOSiR

12 July 2014 Friendly	Lechia Gdańsk	4–0	Panathinaikos	Gdańsk, Poland
18:00	Pawłowski 67'; Janicki 73'; Vranješ 77'; Makuszewski 79'	Report		Stadium: MOSiR Stadium

19 July 2014 Friendly	Panegialios	0–1	Panathinaikos	Aigio, Greece
19:30		Report	Berg 9'	Stadium: Aigio Stadium

23 July 2014 Friendly	Panathinaikos	2–1	Atromitos	Athens, Greece
	Petrić 34'; Klonaridis 77'	Report	Brito 19'	Stadium: Leoforos Alexandras Stadium

13 August 2014 Friendly	Panathinaikos	1–0	Panachaiki	Athens, Greece
	Berg 55'	Report		Stadium: Leoforos Alexandras Stadium

6 September 2014 Friendly	Panathinaikos	1–0	Viitorul Constanța	Athens, Greece
20:00	Koutroumpis 44'	Report		Stadium: Leoforos Alexandras Stadium

22 November 2014 Friendly	AEK Athens	3–2	Panathinaikos	Athens, Greece
15:00	Aravidis 27'; Platellas 36'; D'Acol 65'	Report	Donis 47'; Berisha 54'	Stadium: Olympic Stadium

== Competitions ==
=== Super League Greece ===
==== Regular season ====
===== League table =====
Pos	Team	Pld	W	D	L	GF	GA	GD	Pts	Qualification or relegation
1	Olympiacos (C)	34	24	6	4	79	23	+56	78	Qualification for the Champions League group stage
2	Panathinaikos (Note: Panathinaikos were deducted 3 points due to extreme fan behavior.)	34	21	6	7	59	31	+28	66	Qualification for the Play-offs
3	PAOK	34	20	5	9	57	42	+15	65	Qualification for the Play-offs
4	Asteras Tripolis	34	17	8	9	52	37	+15	59	Qualification for the Play-offs
5	Atromitos	34	14	12	8	43	27	+16	54	Qualification for the Play-offs

Source: Super League Greece
Rules for classification: 1) Points; 2) Head-to-head goal difference; 3) Head-to-head points; 4) Goals scored; 5) Play-offs (neutral ground).
(Note: Criteria 5 is only used if needed to decide champion, teams for relegation or teams for UEFA competitions). In any other case, the final standings of tied teams are determined with a public draw.
(C) Champions

===== Matches =====
24 August 2014 1	Levadiakos	1–1	Panathinaikos	Athens
21:30	Kotsios 77'	Report	Pranjić 84' (pen.)	Stadium: Olympic Stadium; Attendance: 2,276; Referee: Dimitris Thanos

31 August 2014 2	Panathinaikos	2–1	Panionios	Athens
21:00	Ajagun 90+1'; Petrić 90+4'	Report	Boumale 85'	Stadium: Leoforos Alexandras Stadium; Attendance: - Referee: Michail Koukoulakis

14 September 2014 3	AEL Kalloni	1–0	Panathinaikos	Mytilene
20:30	Llorente (yellow card) 34'; Leozinho 35' (yellow card) 63'; Manousos (yellow card) 81' (yellow-red card) 86'; Hogg (yellow card) 90+1'; Chorianopoulos (yellow card) 90+3'	Report	Bouy (yellow card) 19'; Bajrami (yellow card) 63'; Lagos (yellow card) 78'; Bourbos (yellow card) 80'; Klonaridis (yellow card) 90+2'	Stadium: Mytilene Municipal Stadium; Attendance: 2,419; Referee: Stavros Tritsonis (Athens)

21 September 2014 4	Platanias	2–3	Panathinaikos	Chania
20:30	Coulibaly 14'; Torres 14'	Report	Karelis 10'; Dinas 52'; Zeca 69'	Stadium: Perivolia Municipal Stadium; Attendance: 2,522; Referee: Alexandros Aretopoulos

28 September 2014 5	Panathinaikos	1–0	Niki Volos	Athens
16:00	Ajagun 42'	Report		Stadium: Leoforos Alexandras Stadium; Attendance: 9,055; Referee: Apostolos Ambarkiolis

*4 December 2014 6	Panetolikos	0–1	Panathinaikos	Agrinio
17:15		Report	Petrić 81'	Stadium: Panetolikos Stadium; Attendance: 3,627; Referee: Michail Voskakis

19 October 2014 7	Panathinaikos	1–2	OFI Crete	Athens
16:00	Tripotseris 77' (o.g.)	Report	Merebashvili 21'; Makris 90+4'	Stadium: Leoforos Alexandras Stadium; Attendance: 10,603; Referee: Giorgos Kominis

26 October 2014 8	Olympiacos	1–0	Panathinaikos	Piraeus
19:30	Avlonitis 59'	Report		Stadium: Karaiskakis Stadium; Attendance: 31,458; Referee: Charalambos Kalogeropoulos

2 November 2014 9	Panathinaikos	2–0	Atromitos	Athens
19:30	Lazaridis 27' (o.g.); Karelis 85'	Report		Stadium: Leoforos Alexandras Stadium; Attendance: 9,365; Referee: Dimitris Styliaras

9 November 2014 10	PAOK	1–2	Panathinaikos	Thessaloniki
19:30	Pereyra 63'	Report	Ajagun 51'; Karelis 79'	Stadium: Toumba Stadium; Attendance: 24,903; Referee: Stavros Tritsonis

*11 January 2014 11	Panathinaikos	5–0	Ergotelis	Athens
17:15	Klonaridis 8'; Tavlaridis 23'; Berg 12', 15', 42'	Report		Stadium: Leoforos Alexandras Stadium; Attendance: 8,038; Referee: Stefanos Mantakis

30 November 2014 12	Panathinaikos	2–1	Veria	Athens
19:30	Pranjić 26' (pen.); Berg 47'	Report	Kaltsas 68'	Stadium: Leoforos Alexandras Stadium; Attendance: 7,009; Referee: Georgios Kyzas

7 December 2014 13	Asteras Tripolis	1–1	Panathinaikos	Tripoli
19:30	Sankaré 36'	Report	Lagos 30'	Stadium: Theodoros Kolokotronis Stadium; Attendance: 1,889; Referee: Giorgos Kominis

14 December 2014 14	Panathinaikos	4–0	Panthrakikos	Athens
19:30	Karelis 1'; Petrić 51'; Zeca 79'; Berg 90+2'	Report		Stadium: Leoforos Alexandras Stadium; Attendance: 7,043; Referee: Praxiteles Zachariadis

18 December 2014 15	Skoda Xanthi	4–2	Panathinaikos	Xanthi
19:30	Goutas 3'; Vasilakakis 16'; Soltani 52'; Kapetanos 63'	Report	Karelis 17', 65'	Stadium: Skoda Xanthi Arena; Attendance: 3,356; Referee: Stavros Mantalos

22 December 2014 16	Panathinaikos	2–0	Kerkyra	Athens
19:30	Karelis 45'; Chouchoumis 85'	Report		Stadium: Leoforos Alexandras Stadium; Attendance: 5,705; Referee: Marios Lampropoulos

*4–5 January 2015 17	PAS Giannina	0–0	Panathinaikos	Ioannina
19:30		Report		Stadium: Zosimades Stadium; Attendance: 4,143; Referee: Alexandros Aretopoulos

14 January 2015 18	Panathinaikos	1–0	Levadiakos	Athens
17:15	Petrić 29'	Report		Stadium: Leoforos Alexandras Stadium; Attendance: 5,820; Referee: Georgios Liachoudis

17 January 2015 19	Panionios	1–1	Panathinaikos	Athens
19:30	Boumale 33'	Report	Berg 78'	Stadium: Nea Smyrni Stadium; Attendance: 1,849; Referee: Stavros Mantalos

25 January 2015 20	Panathinaikos	1–0	AEL Kalloni	Athens
19:15	Berg 78'	Report		Stadium: Leoforos Alexandras Stadium; Attendance: 4,906; Referee: Athanasios Giaxos

1 February 2015 21	Panathinaikos	3–0	Platanias	Athens
15:00	Petrić 7'; Triantafylopoulos 47'; Klonaridis 78'	Report		Stadium: Leoforos Alexandras Stadium; Attendance: 6,059; Referee: Dimitris Styliaras

5 February 2015 22	Niki Volos	0–3 (w/o)	Panathinaikos	Volos
19:30				Stadium: Panthessaliko Stadium

8 February 2015 23	Panathinaikos	1–0	Panetolikos	Athens
17:15	Petrić 67'	Report		Stadium: Leoforos Alexandras Stadium; Attendance: 8,781; Referee: Anastasios Sidiropoulos

14 February 2015 24	OFI Crete	2–3	Panathinaikos	Heraklion
15:00	Moniakis 29'; Merebashvili 44' (pen.)	Report	Karelis 2', 75'; Pranjić 49'	Stadium: Theodoros Vardinogiannis Stadium; Attendance: 4,452; Referee: Alexandros Dimitropoulos

22 February 2015 25	Panathinaikos	2–1	Olympiacos	Athens
19:30	Masuaku 49' (o.g.); Petrić 79'	Report	Domínguez 90+7'	Stadium: Leoforos Alexandras Stadium; Attendance: 15,383; Referee: Anastasios Sidiropoulos

1 March 2015 26	Atromitos	2–0	Panathinaikos	Athens
19:30	Marcelinho 10'; Umbidesi 59' (pen.)	Report		Stadium: Peristeri Stadium; Attendance: 1,671; Referee: Georgios Daskalopoulos

8 March 2015 27	Panathinaikos	4–3	PAOK	Athens
19:30	Berg 27', 70', 87'; Karelis 63'	Report	Athanasiadis 42'; Skondras 60'; Noboa 90+3'	Stadium: Leoforos Alexandras Stadium; Attendance: - Referee: Stavros Mantalos

14 March 2015 28	Ergotelis	0–2	Panathinaikos	Heraklion
19:30		Report	Berg 31'; Ajagun 40'	Stadium: Pankritio Stadium; Attendance: - Referee: Stavros Tritsonis

22 March 2015 29	Veria	1–0	Panathinaikos	Veria
19:30	Ben Nabouhane 36'	Report		Stadium: Veria Stadium; Attendance: 1,582; Referee: Alexandros Aretopoulos

4 April 2015 30	Panathinaikos	2–2	Asteras Tripolis	Athens
19:30	Berg 6', 47'	Report	Barrales 68', 72'	Stadium: Leoforos Alexandras Stadium; Attendance: - Referee: Athanasios Giaxos

19 April 2015 31	Panthrakikos	2–1	Panathinaikos	Komotini
15:00	Diguiny 45'; Tzanis 90+1'	Report	Schildenfeld 55'	Stadium: Komotini Municipal Stadium; Attendance: 1,593; Referee: Georgios Kyzas

25 April 2015 32	Panathinaikos	2–0	Skoda Xanthi	Athens
19:30	Karelis 67'; Pranjić 90+5' (pen.)	Report		Stadium: Leoforos Alexandras Stadium; Attendance: 4,660; Referee: Michail Koukoulakis

3 May 2015 33	Kerkyra	1–1	Panathinaikos	Kerkyra
19:00	Kontos 62' (pen.)	Report	Karelis 22'	Stadium: Kerkyra Stadium; Attendance: 1,809; Referee: Michail Voskakis

10 May 2015 34	Panathinaikos	3–1	PAS Giannina	Athens
19:00	Klonaridis 4'; Karelis 50'; Lagos 60'	Report	Ilić 5'	Stadium: Leoforos Alexandras Stadium; Attendance: 5,248; Referee: Andreas Pappas

- The sixth game, against Panetolikos F.C, which was originally scheduled for October 5, will be held on 4 December.
- The eleventh game, against Ergotelis F.C, which was originally scheduled for November 23, will be held on 11 January 2015.
- The sixteenth game, against PAS Giannina, started on 4 January 2015 but it stopped due fog. The game continued on 5 January 2015 (time 15:00).

==== UEFA play-offs ====
===== League table =====
Pos	Team	Pld	W	D	L	GF	GA	GD	Pts	Qualification
2	Panathinaikos	6	4	1	1	9	2	+7	15	Qualification for the Champions League third qualifying round
3	Asteras Tripolis	6	2	3	1	2	4	−2	10	Qualification for the Europa League group stage
4	Atromitos	6	2	2	2	4	4	0	8	Qualification for the Europa League third qualifying round
5	PAOK	6	0	2	4	1	6	−5	4	Qualification for the Europa League second qualifying round

Source: Super League Greece: Standings and Schedule
Rules for classification: 1) points; 2) head-to-head points; 3) head-to-head goal difference; 4) head-to-head away goals rule; 5) classification of regular season.

===== Matches =====
20 May 2015 1	Asteras Tripolis	0–4	Panathinaikos	Tripoli
18:15		Report	Schildenfeld 26'; Karelis 45', 55'; Berg 82'	Stadium: Theodoros Kolokotronis Stadium; Attendance: 2,536; Referee: Michail Voskakis

24 May 2015 2	Panathinaikos	2–0	Atromitos	Athens
20:30	Berg 61', 67'	Report		Stadium: Leoforos Alexandras Stadium; Attendance: 8,659; Referee: Alexandros Aretopoulos

27 May 2015 3	PAOK	0–1	Panathinaikos	Thessaloniki
19:30		Report	Tavlaridis 43'	Stadium: Toumba Stadium; Attendance: 9,473; Referee: Dimitris Styliaras

31 May 2015 4	Panathinaikos	2–0	PAOK	Athens
20:30	Mavrias 10'; Karelis 28'	Report		Stadium: Leoforos Alexandras Stadium; Attendance: 12,964; Referee: Christos Mitsios

3 June 2015 5	Panathinaikos	0–0	Asteras Tripolis	Athens
18:15		Report		Stadium: Leoforos Alexandras Stadium; Attendance: 5,486; Referee: Michail Koukoulakis

7 June 2015 6	Atromitos	2–0	Panathinaikos	Athens
20:30	Katsouranis 41', 61'	Report		Stadium: Peristeri Stadium; Attendance: 1,130; Referee: Georgios Kyzas

=== Greek Cup ===
==== Group H ====
Pos	Team	Pld	W	D	L	GF	GA	GD	Pts	Qualification	PAO	CHA	OLV	PNT
1	Panathinaikos	3	2	1	0	6	3	+3	7	Round of 16		—	—	3–1
2	Chania	3	1	2	0	3	2	+1	5	Round of 16	2–2		0–0	—
3	Olympiacos Volos	3	1	1	1	2	1	+1	4		0–1	—		—
4	Panetolikos	3	0	0	3	1	6	−5	0		—	0–1	0–2	

Source: epo.gr

24 September 2014 1	Olympiacos Volos	0–1	Panathinaikos	Volos
19:00 UTC+2		Report	Ajagun 18'	Stadium: Volos Municipal Stadium; Referee: Anastasios Sidiropoulos (Dodecanese)

30 October 2014 2	Panathinaikos	3–1	Panetolikos	Athens
19:30 UTC+2	Klonaridis 50'; Bouy 58'; Berg 84'	Report	Koutromanos 62'	Stadium: Leoforos Alexandras Stadium; Referee: Georgios Daskalopoulos (Corinth)

8 January 2015 3	Chania	2–2	Panathinaikos	Chania
19:30 UTC+2	Kritikos 75'; Pangalos 84'	Report	Ninis 17'; Klonaridis 29'	Stadium: Perivolia Municipal Stadium; Referee: Thanasis Giahos (Chios)

==== Third round ====
21 January 2015 First leg	Skoda Xanthi	1–1	Panathinaikos	Xanthi
15:00	Lucero 32'		Karelis 88'	Stadium: Skoda Xanthi Arena; Referee: Andreas Pappas (Athens)

29 January 2015 Second leg	Panathinaikos	0–1 (1–2 agg.)	Skoda Xanthi	Athens
19:00		Report	Vasilakakis 88'	Stadium: Leoforos Alexandras Stadium; Referee: Anastasios Sidiropoulos (Dodecanese)

=== UEFA Champions League ===
==== Qualifying phase ====
===== Third qualifying round =====
30 July 2014 First leg	Standard Liège (Belgium)	0–0	(Greece) Panathinaikos	Liège, Belgium
21:00		Report		Stadium: Stade Maurice Dufrasne; Referee: Carlos Clos Gómez (Spain)

5 August 2014 Second leg	Panathinaikos (Greece)	1–2 (1–2 agg.)	(Belgium) Standard Liège	Athens, Greece
21:00	Arslanagić 17' (o.g.)	Report	Mbombo 36'; M'Poku 42'	Stadium: Leoforos Alexandras Stadium; Attendance: 14,227; Referee: Michael Oliver (England)

=== UEFA Europa League ===
==== Play-off round ====
21 August 2014 First leg	Panathinaikos (Greece)	4–1	(Denmark) Midtjylland	Athens, Greece
21:00	Berg 21', 24', 45', 89'	Report	Lauridsen 13'	Stadium: Leoforos Alexandras Stadium; Attendance: 13,102; Referee: István Vad (Hungary)

28 August 2014 Second leg	Midtjylland (Denmark)	1–2 (2–6 agg.)	(Greece) Panathinaikos	Herning, Denmark
21:00	Igboun 73' (pen.)	Report	Nano 55'; Klonaridis 74'	Stadium: MCH Arena; Referee: Danny Makkelie (Netherlands)

==== Group E ====
Pos	Team	Pld	W	D	L	GF	GA	GD	Pts	Qualification	DYM	PSV	EST	PAN
1	(Russia) Dynamo Moscow	6	6	0	0	9	3	+6	18	Advance to knockout phase	—	1–0	1–0	2–1
2	(Netherlands) PSV Eindhoven	6	2	2	2	8	8	0	8	Advance to knockout phase	0–1	—	1–0	1–1
3	(Portugal) Estoril	6	1	2	3	7	8	−1	5		1–2	3–3	—	2–0
4	(Greece) Panathinaikos	6	0	2	4	6	11	−5	2		1–2	2–3	1–1	—

Source: Soccerway
Rules for classification: Group stage tiebreakers

18 September 2014 1	Panathinaikos (Greece)	1–2	(Russia) Dynamo Moscow	Athens, Greece
20:00	Dinas 63'	Report	Kokorin 40'; Ionov 49'	Stadium: Leoforos Alexandras Stadium; Attendance: 14,000; Referee: Daniele Orsato (Italy)

2 October 2014 2	Estoril (Portugal)	2–0	(Greece) Panathinaikos	Estoril, Portugal
22:05	Kléber 52'; Amado 66'	Report		Stadium: Estádio António Coimbra da Mota; Attendance: 1,985; Referee: Serge Gumienny (Belgium)

23 October 2014 3	PSV Eindhoven (Netherlands)	1–1	(Greece) Panathinaikos	Eindhoven, Netherlands
22:05	Depay 44'	Report	Karelis 87'	Stadium: Philips Stadion; Attendance: 21,800; Referee: Miroslav Zelinka (Czech Republic)

6 November 2014 4	Panathinaikos (Greece)	2–3	(Netherlands) PSV Eindhoven	Athens, Greece
20:00	Ajagun 11'; Petrić 43'	Report	Depay 27'; De Jong 65'; Wijnaldum 78'	Stadium: Leoforos Alexandras Stadium; Attendance: 14,240; Referee: Marijo Strahonja (Croatia)

27 November 2014 5	Dynamo Moscow (Russia)	2–1	(Greece) Panathinaikos	Khimki, Russia
18:00	Triantafyllopoulos 55' (o.g.); Ionov 61'	Report	Berg 14'	Stadium: Arena Khimki; Attendance: 4,207; Referee: Eitan Shmuelevitz (Israel)

11 December 2014 6	Panathinaikos (Greece)	1–1	(Portugal) Estoril	Athens, Greece
20:00	Karelis 55'	Report	Kléber 87'	Stadium: Leoforos Alexandras Stadium; Attendance: 2,050; Referee: Harald Lechner (Austria)

== Season statistics (only official games have included) ==
From	To	Record								
From	To	M	W	D	L	GF	GA	GD	Win %	Ref.
1 July 2014	7 June 2015	53	27	12	14	85	53	+32	50.94	

== Top goalscorers ==
Rank	Player	Position	Super League Greece	Greek Playoffs	Greek Cup	Champions League	Europa League	Total
1	(Sweden) Marcus Berg	CF	13	3	1	0	5	22
2	(Greece) Nikos Karelis	CF	13	3	1	0	2	19
3	(Croatia) Mladen Petrić	CF	7	0	0	0	1	8
4	(Nigeria) Abdul Jeleel Ajagun	CM	4	0	1	0	1	6
4	(Greece) Viktor Klonaridis	AM	3	0	2	0	1	6
5	(Croatia) Danijel Pranjić	CM	4	0	0	0	0	4
6	(Portugal) Zeca	CM	2	0	0	0	0	2
6	(Greece) Anastasios Lagos	DM	2	0	0	0	0	2
6	(Croatia) Gordon Schildenfeld	CB	1	1	0	0	0	2
6	(Greece) Efstathios Tavlaridis	CB	1	1	0	0	0	2
6	(Greece) Thanasis Dinas	AM	1	0	0	0	1	2
7	(Greece) Diamantis Chouchoumis	LB	1	0	0	0	0	1
7	(Greece) Konstantinos Triantafyllopoulos	CB	1	0	0	0	0	1
7	(Greece) Charalampos Mavrias	RW	0	1	0	0	0	1
7	(Netherlands) Ouasim Bouy	CM	0	0	1	0	0	1
7	(Greece) Sotiris Ninis	MF	0	0	1	0	0	1
7	(Spain) Nano	LB	0	0	0	0	1	1
Own goals	(Greece) Theodoros Tripotseris (OFI Crete)	CB	1	–	–	–	–	1
Own goals	(Greece) Nikolaos Lazaridis (Atromitos)	CB	1	0	–	–	–	1
Own goals	(France) Arthur Masuaku (Olympiacos)	LB	1	–	–	–	–	1
Own goals	(Belgium) Dino Arslanagić (Standard Liège)	CB	–	–	–	1	–	1
Total			56	9	7	1	12	85
