= Nikos Karelis =

Greek footballer (born 1992)

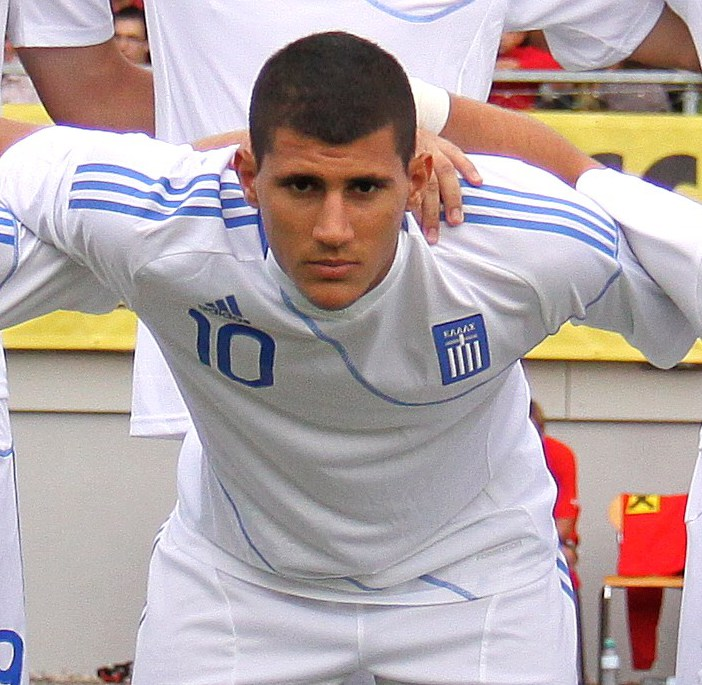
- Karelis with Greece U19 in 2011

Personal information
- Full name: Nikolaos Karelis
- Date of birth: 24 February 1992 (age 34)
- Place of birth: Heraklion, Crete, Greece
- Height: 1.73 m (5 ft 8 in)
- Position: Forward

Team information
- Current team: Sliema Wanderers
- Number: 19

Youth career
- 2006–2007: Ergotelis

Senior career*
Years	Team	Apps	(Gls)
2007–2012	Ergotelis	30	(1)
2012–2013	Amkar Perm	9	(0)
2013–2016	Panathinaikos	83	(29)
2016–2019	Genk	56	(23)
2018–2019	→ PAOK (loan)	5	(0)
2019–2020	Brentford	4	(0)
2020–2021	ADO Den Haag	9	(0)
2021–2024	Panetolikos	93	(22)
2024–2025	Mumbai City	19	(10)
2025–2026	Panserraikos	24	(1)
2026–	Sliema Wanderers	7	(2)

International career
2009–2010	Greece U17	5	(3)
2008–2011	Greece U19	29	(4)
2010–2014	Greece U21	18	(9)
2014–2018	Greece	19	(3)
- * Club domestic league appearances and goals as of 11 October 2026

Nikos Karelis (Greek: Νίκος Καρέλης; born 24 February 1992) is a Greek professional footballer who plays as a forward for Maltese Premier League club Sliema Wanderers.

== Club career ==
=== Ergotelis ===
Born in Arkalochori, Heraklion, Karelis began playing football at the age of six, when his father, a retired footballer, signed him up at the infrastructure segments of Ergotelis. Karelis started training with the men's team at age 14 and signed his first professional contract with the club at the age of 15. He made his debut on 20 April 2008, on the final day of the 2007–08 Super League Greece, entering as a second-half substitute (78 minute) in Ergotelis' 2–0 victory over Skoda Xanthi, thus becoming the youngest player to have ever been fielded for Ergotelis in a Super League match.

Karelis soon drew the attention of Premier League club Arsenal, and was invited to London to take part in a ten-day trial. He joined Arsenal's under 16s and travelled with them to Italy to take part in the Atalanta u16s Cup Tournament. Karelis scored two goals for the Gunners and made a strong impression, helping Arsenal win the cup, beating Juventus in the final on penalties. Having already signed a new contract with Ergotelis, a possible transfer move to the Premier League side was postponed, and eventually never completed.

In the 2008–09 season, Karelis was sidelined, making only two senior appearances adding up a total of 17 minutes of play. In August 2009 he was offered a new three-year contract. Karelis featured more in the 2009–10 season, making six appearances, predominantly as cover for veteran strikers Māris Verpakovskis and Sergio Leal. Karelis scored during a friendly game vs. Olympiacos, on 6 September 2009 commemorating Ergotelis' 80th anniversary, netting in the fifth to complete his club's win over the reigning champions in a memorable 5–0 victory.

Karelis had his best season for Ergotelis in the 2010–11 Super League, playing a total of 13 times, two of which as a starter. He also scored his first Super League goal in the final fixture, converting a penalty kick in a 4–0 away win vs. Panserraikos. He added another 9 appearances in the 2011–12 season, in which the club was eventually relegated to the Football League. Following Ergotels's relegation, Karelis decided to move on and despite reported interest from other Super League clubs, signed with Russian Premier League side Amkar Perm.

=== Panathinaikos ===
On 30 July 2013, Karelis signed for Panathinaikos a three-year contract, with Amkar Perm retaining a 20% sell-on-clause. He made his Panathinaikos debut on 18 August 2013 in a 2–0 home win against Panetolikos. He scored his first two goals for the club on the 24 Novemeer 2013 in a 3–1 home win against PAS Giannina. On 26 April 2014, he scored the third goal to help secure the first trophy of his career in a 4–1 win against PAOK in the Greek Cup final. On 15 February 2015, in a match with OFI, he scored two goals, helping Panathinaikos to a 3–2 away win. Following Nano, Abdul Jeleel Ajagun and Thanasis Dinas, Nikos Karelis signed a contract on increased terms with Panathinaikos until the summer of 2018.

In May 2019, after scoring 16 goals, prior to Super League playoffs (13 in the Super League, 2 in Europa League and 1 in the Greek Cup), Karelis was linked with moves to Torino and Werder Bremen. On 31 May 2015, Panathinaikos reportedly turned down a Lille bid for Karelis. In summer 2015, Anderlecht and Getafe CF were linked with possibles moves during the summer transfer window.

On 28 July 2015, a penalty from Karelis clinched a 2–1 win for Panathinaikos against Club Brugge, in the first leg of the UEFA Champions League of the third qualifying round. He started the 2015–16 season by scoring in a 2–1 away win against Panetolikos. On 28 October 2015, despite Karelis lower productivity in the season, is still attracting Genk's interest, for the upcoming transfer window. Genk tried to lure the Greek striker away from Panathinaikos over the summer but the Greens rejected two bids for his services. He left the club as the first scorer of the first half of the season with 9 goals and 5 assists.

=== Genk ===
On 12 January 2016, Karelis signed a 3.5-year contract with Genk, with Panathinaikos keeping a 16% next transfer percentage. He made his debut for the club on 15 January 2016 at home to Waregem, coming on as a 77th-minute substitute for Alejandro Pozuelo and then scoring the winning goal in the 88th minute to give Genk's 10 men a 2–1 victory. On 3 February 2016, he scored in the 1–1 draw against Standard Liège but the result was not enough to see them through to the next round of the Belgian Cup. On 13 February 2016, Karelis scored a brace one with a kick in a 6–1 win against Waasland-Beveren. On 28 February 2016, he opened the score with a penalty kick in a 3–2 home win against Club Brugge. On 5 March 2016, he opened the score after an assist from Alejandro Pozuelo in a 2–1 away loss against Standard Liège. On 1 May 2016, he scored the only goal as a substitute, in a 3–1 away loss against Club Brugge. On the last home game for the season, he scored the last goal as a substitute in a 5–2 victory against rivals Anderlecht for the playoffs. On 29 May 2015, in the last game of Play-offs Finals against Charleroi he scored a hat-trick, his first in the season, helping his club to win the exit to next Europa League' season, arrived at 10 goals in his first season in Belgian Pro League.

In his first match for the 2016–17 season Karelis opened the score after an in a 2–1 home win against Oostende. On 21 September 2016, he scored four times in his team's 4–0 away victory against Aalst for the Belgian Cup. On 29 September 2016, he scored his first international goal for the season when he opened the score in a 3–1 home Europa League Group stage match against Italian club Sassuolo. On 2 October 2016, he equalised with a penalty kick the score in a 2–1 home win against KV Mechelen. On 15 October 2016, he netted both goals against Mouscron, helping his club to escape with a valuable 2–2 away draw. On 23 October 2016, he netted the only goal helping his club to acquire a valuable win against Sint-Truidense for the Belgian Pro League. On 26 October 2016, a lackluster start by the home side Charleroi was punished after four minutes as Genk's Mbwana Samatta headed a corner towards the far post and there Karelis surprised everyone with his seventh goal of the season, opening the score in a 2–1 away loss. On 29 October 2016, he scored his second goal in a Pro League 2–1 home game against Westerlo, extended his run of scoring to a record of 5 matches, became the League top goalscorer so far. On 24 November 2016, in a UEFA Europa League group stage home match against Rapid Wien he fired in Genk's early winner from close range after Leon Bailey's header hits the bar, being the MVP of the match. On 14 December 2016, he scored three goals in an overtime win against Charleroi helping Genk advance to the semifinals of the Belgian Cup. On 27 December 2016, he scored with a penalty kick in a 2–0 home win against Gent, but at the very beginning of the second half faced a cruciate ligament rupture that probably kept him out of the team for at least 8 months. Karelis was injured early in the second half on a play that did not involve a foul or even a challenge. Karelis was simply dribbling the ball as fell hard on his left knee, causing the ACL rupture.

On 19 October 2017, Karelis returned to the pitch after a difficult recovery process (290 days to be exact) from his ruptured ACL injury. The Greek striker played 45 minutes with Genk's second team in a friendly match against Lokeren, and a week later he made his debut with the first team as a substitute in a 0–0 away game against Kortrijk. On 17 December 2017, in his 7th appearance in the squad, after his injury, scored with the head helping his club to acquire a vital 1–1 away draw against rivals Charleroi. On 9 February 2018, since returning from a serious injury earlier in the season, the 25-year old has struggled for goals, not always in the Genk starting line-up. Nevertheless, Karelis managed to score his second goal in the 2017–18 season in a 3–1 win against Zulte Waregem. Seventeen minutes after the match began, a poor error allowed Karelis to go clean through with the goalkeeper. His first effort was saved, but he picked up the rebound to steer the ball into the unguarded net. Karelis then registered an assist for Genk's second goal, later leaving the pitch with five minutes remaining. On 17 February 2018, Karelis scored his third of the season for Genk, helping his team claim an entertaining 2–2 draw against Club Brugge in the Jupiler League. In the 11th minute Karelis escaped the attentions of the Brugge defence, calmly slotting beyond opposing goalkeeper Kenneth Vermeer into the far left corner. However, there was a sting in the tail, as Karelis failed to convert a penalty in the second half. On 23 February 2018, he scored for third consecutive game after an assist from Joakim Mæhle in a 4–0 home win game against Antwerp.

==== Loan to PAOK ====
In the summer of 2018, PAOK showed an interest in the Greek international, but the transfer fee of €5 million was prohibitive for the club. Karelis joined PAOK at the transfer deadline day on a loan deal. On 15 September he made his debut with the club as a starter in a 3–1 away win game against OFI. On 20 December 2018, he scored a brace in a comfortable 6–0 away win against Aittitos Spata for the Greek Cup.

=== Brentford ===
On 22 August 2019, free agent Karelis signed for English Championship side, Brentford, initially on a 1-year deal with an option for another year. In October 2019 he suffered a 'serious' knee injury. He was released at the end of the season after a difficult recovery process (194 days to be exact) from his ruptured ACL injury.

=== ADO Den Haag ===
On 8 October 2020, ADO Den Haag has strengthened itself with the signing of the Greek international Nikos Karelis as a free transfer. The 28-year-old striker signed a one-year contract, with an option for another season. He had been without a club since his contract with Premier League club Brentford was not renewed in the summer of 2020.

=== Panetolikos ===
On 30 January 2021, Karelis returned to the Super League Greece, signing a contract with Panetolikos, until the summer of 2022, on a free transfer. On 17 October 2021, he scored his first goal with the club with a header, opening the score in a frustrating 2–1 home loss against rivals OFI. It was his first goal after almost 26 months. On 18 December 2021, he scored as a substitute, the winning goal against Atromitos helping his club to acquire a vital 2–1 home win game, in its effort to avoid relegation. On 16 January 2022, along with his teammate Javier Mendoza are the main protagonists with one goal and one assist each, in a triumphatic 2–1 away win against AEK Athens and a week later he scored again after Javier Mendoza's assist in a new away 4–2 win against OFI. On 19 January 2022, between the two games for the championship, along with the usual protagonist of the last games, Javier Mendoza, he scored again against champions Olympiacos taking a 2–1 lead for the final qualification in the next round of the Greek Cup. On 6 March 2022, he opened the score in vital 2–1 Super League away win against Ionikos.

On 1 July 2022, Karelis signed two-year contract renewal.

=== Mumbai City ===
On 11 July 2024, Karelis joined Indian Super League club Mumbai City on a one-year contract until the end of the 2024–25 season.

Karelis made his debut for the club in the first match of the season, starting against Mohun Bagan SG. In the match, he got an assist, with the ball hitting him before Tiri scored Mumbai's first goal of the match. The match eventually ended 2-2 following a late goal from defender Thaer Krouma.

Karelis scored his first goal in his second league appearance against Jamshedpur FC with a long-range shot into the top corner. However, it was in a losing cause, as Mumbai went on to lose the match 3–2.

Following a goalless game against Bengaluru FC, Karelis got his second goal of the season away against FC Goa, scoring a diving header from a Yoell van Nieff free kick. This was the first goal of the game, which eventually ended 2–1 in favour of Mumbai. Karelis scored again in the next match, scoring the equalizer at home against Odisha FC with a close range finish, in an eventual 1–1 draw. Karelis scored again in the next match, getting a brace in a 4–2 win at home against Kerala Blasters FC. His first goal was, once again, a close-range finish following a Lallianzuala Chhangte cross, and his second goal was a penalty after a handball by Blasters striker Kwame Peprah in the penalty area.

Following a 5-match goalless streak, Karelis broke his duck at home against Chennaiyin FC on 21 December 2024, scoring a composed one-on-one finish into the bottom corner in the eighth minute of the match. This goal ended up being the match-winner, with the match ending 1–0 to The Islanders. Karelis got his second brace on 6 January 2025, this time away against East Bengal FC. His first goal of the match came from a rebound, after his initial shot was saved by goalkeeper Prabhsukhan Gill in the 44th minute. His second goal came in the 87th minute following a long pass from Nathan Rodrigues, which East Bengal defender Hijazi Maher was unable to intercept. This second goal was Mumbai's third goal of the match, which also ended up being the winning goal in a 3–2 victory for Mumbai.

=== Panserraikos ===
On 24 September 2025, Super League Greece club Panserraikos FC announced Karelis had signed for the club.

=== Sliema Wanderers ===
On 15 August 2026, Karelis signed for Sliema Wanderers on a free transfer.

== International career ==
In his full international debut with the Greece national football team he scored against Finland in Helsinki during the UEFA Euro 2016 qualifying. In that 1–1 away draw, the risk that Greece coach Claudio Ranieri took by introducing a previously unseen forward lineup (Charalampos Mavrias, Nikos Karelis and Stefanos Athanasiadis) seemed to pay off in the first half, but the lack of experience shown in the second as Greece could not hold onto their lead and risked losing all three points, besides the fact that with 24 minutes on the clock the ball fell to Karelis who unleashed a swerving shot from the left that swung its way to the left corner of the Finnish goal for 1–0.

== Career statistics ==
=== Club ===
As of match played 17 May 2026

Appearances and goals by club, season and competition
Club	Season	League			National cup (Note: Includes Greek Cup, Russian Cup, KNVB Cup, Belgian Cup, Super Cup)		Continental		Total	
Club	Season	Division	Apps	Goals	Apps	Goals	Apps	Goals	Apps	Goals
Ergotelis	2007–08	Super League Greece	1	0	0	0	—		1	0
Ergotelis	2008–09	Super League Greece	2	0	0	0	—		2	0
Ergotelis	2009–10	Super League Greece	6	0	0	0	—		6	0
Ergotelis	2010–11	Super League Greece	12	1	1	0	—		13	1
Ergotelis	2011–12	Super League Greece	9	0	0	0	—		9	0
Ergotelis	Total		30	1	1	0	—		31	1
Amkar Perm	2012–13	Russian Premier League	9	0	1	0	—		10	0
Panathinaikos	2013–14	Super League Greece	32	5	9	3	―		41	8
Panathinaikos	2014–15	Super League Greece	36	16	5	1	9 (Note: Two appearances in UEFA Champions League, seven appearances and two goals in UEFA Europa League)	2	50	19
Panathinaikos	2015–16	Super League Greece	15	8	3	0	4 (Note: Two appearances and one goal in UEFA Champions League, two appearances in UEFA Europa League)	1	22	9
Panathinaikos	Total		83	29	17	4	13	3	113	36
Genk	2015–16	Belgian Pro League	18	10	2	1	—		20	11
Genk	2016–17	Belgian Pro League	18	9	3	7	11 (Note: Appearance(s) in UEFA Europa League)	2	32	18
Genk	2017–18	Belgian Pro League	20	4	2	0	0	0	22	4
Genk	2018–19	Belgian Pro League	0	0	0	0	1	0	1	0
Genk	Total		56	23	7	8	12	2	75	33
PAOK (loan)	2018–19	Super League Greece	5	0	4	3	1	0	10	3
Brentford	2019–20	Championship	4	0	0	0	0	0	4	0
ADO Den Haag	2020–21	Eredivisie	9	0	2	0	—		11	0
Panetolikos	2020–21	Super League Greece	12	0	1	0	—		13	0
Panetolikos	2021–22	Super League Greece	30	7	4	3	—		34	10
Panetolikos	2022–23	Super League Greece	29	13	0	0	—		29	13
Panetolikos	2023–24	Super League Greece	22	2	5	2	—		27	4
Panetolikos	Total		93	22	10	5	0	0	103	27
Mumbai City	2024–25	Indian Super League	19	10	3	1	—		22	11
Panserraikos	2025–26	Super League Greece	24	1	0	0	—		24	1
Career total			332	85	45	21	26	5	403	112

=== International ===
As of 7 August 2020.

Appearances and goals by national team and year
National team	Year	Apps	Goals
Greece	2014	3	1
Greece	2015	7	0
Greece	2016	7	1
Greece	2017	0	0
Greece	2018	2	1
Greece	Total	19	3

=== International goals ===
Scores and results list Greece's goal tally first.

#	Date	Venue	Opponent	Score	Result	Competition
1.	11 October 2014	Olympic Stadium, Helsinki, Finland	Finland	1–0	1–1	UEFA Euro 2016 qualification
2.	24 March 2016	Karaiskakis Stadium, Pireaus, Greece	Montenegro	2–1	2–1	Friendly
3.	27 March 2018	Letzigrund, Zürich, Switzerland	Egypt	1–0	1–0	Friendly

== Honours ==
Panathinaikos

- Greek Cup: 2013–14

PAOK

- Super League Greece: 2018–19
- Greek Cup: 2018–19

Individual

- Super League Greece Team of the Season: 2014–15
- Panetolikos Player of the Season: 2022–23
