= Marcus Berg =

Swedish footballer (born 1986)

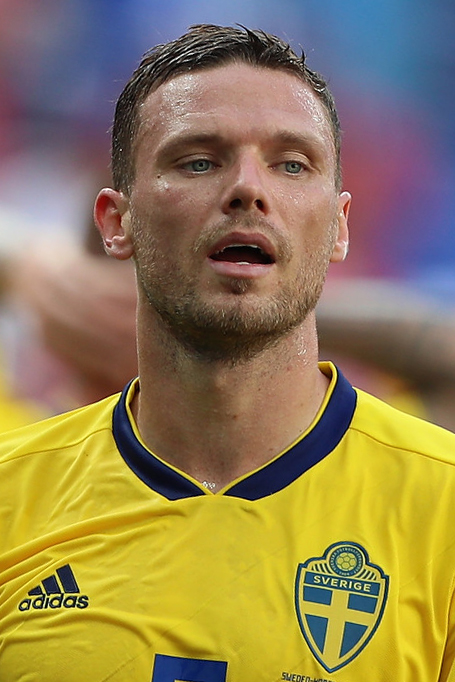
- Berg with Sweden at the 2018 FIFA World Cup

Personal information
- Full name: Bengt Erik Markus Berg
- Date of birth: 17 August 1986 (age 40)
- Place of birth: Torsby, Sweden
- Height: 1.84 m (6 ft 0 in)
- Position: Striker

Team information
- Current team: IFK Göteborg (assistant coach)

Youth career
- 1990–1998: IFK Velen
- 1998–2000: Torsby IF
- 2003–2004: IFK Göteborg

Senior career*
Years	Team	Apps	(Gls)
2000–2003	Torsby IF	24	
2005–2007	IFK Göteborg	53	(21)
2007–2009	Groningen	56	(32)
2009–2013	Hamburger SV	54	(5)
2010–2011	→ PSV (loan)	25	(8)
2013–2017	Panathinaikos	115	(73)
2017–2019	Al Ain	41	(35)
2019–2021	Krasnodar	44	(18)
2021–2023	IFK Göteborg	65	(30)
Total		477	(222)

International career
2004–2005	Sweden U19	8	(3)
2006–2009	Sweden U21	19	(8)
2008–2021	Sweden	90	(24)

Managerial career
- 2025–: IFK Göteborg (assistant)
- * Club domestic league appearances and goals

Bengt Erik Markus Berg (Swedish pronunciation: [ˈmǎrːkɵs ˈbærj]; born 17 August 1986) is a Swedish former professional footballer who played as a striker. He is currently the assistant coach of Allsvenskan club IFK Göteborg.

Beginning his footballing career in Sweden with IFK Göteborg in the early 2000s, Berg went on to play for several clubs across various countries, including Panathinaikos in Greece, PSV and Groningen in the Netherlands, Hamburger SV in Germany, Al Ain in the United Arab Emirates, and Krasnodar in Russia before returning to Sweden to join boyhood club IFK Göteborg in 2021.

A full international from 2008 to 2021, Berg won 90 caps and scored 24 total goals for the Sweden national team. He represented his country at the UEFA Euro 2016, the 2018 FIFA World Cup, and UEFA Euro 2020, before retiring from international football inherently in July 2021.

== Club career ==
=== IFK Göteborg ===
After spending two years in the youth team, during the 2005 season Berg was promoted to the regular squad and played for IFK Göteborg in the Allsvenskan. During the time playing for IFK Göteborg, he played alongside his older brother Jonatan.

Berg played for IFK Göteborg until the 2007 summer and put forth an attracting performance throughout his final season, as he maintained a high scoring efficiency throughout the league matches. Göteborg won the league that season and Berg received a standing ovation upon leaving the field after the 5–0 away victory over Kalmar FF where Berg scored, which was his last for the club because of his suspension for the game against Djurgårdens IF.

Among dedicated IFK Göteborg supporters, Berg is known as Svarte-Marcus ("Black Marcus") due to his many goals in the Göteborg youth and reserve teams, and later also senior team. The nickname is an homage to the legendary IFK Göteborg striker Filip "Svarte-Filip" Johansson.

=== Groningen ===
On 10 August 2007, Dutch club FC Groningen signed Berg for a reported £2.5 million to replace the departing Ajax-bound Luis Suárez.

Berg had a good debut season in the Netherlands. Although he was not the top scorer in the Eredivisie in 2007–08, he scored 18 goals for Groningen, helping the Dutch outfit to a seventh-place finish.

In the 2008–09 season, Groningen remained top of the Eredivisie table after five games played. Berg had a good display as well. He managed to score 13 goals in 15 matches. He also scored four goals in a December game against Roda JC.

=== Hamburger SV ===
==== 2009–10 season ====
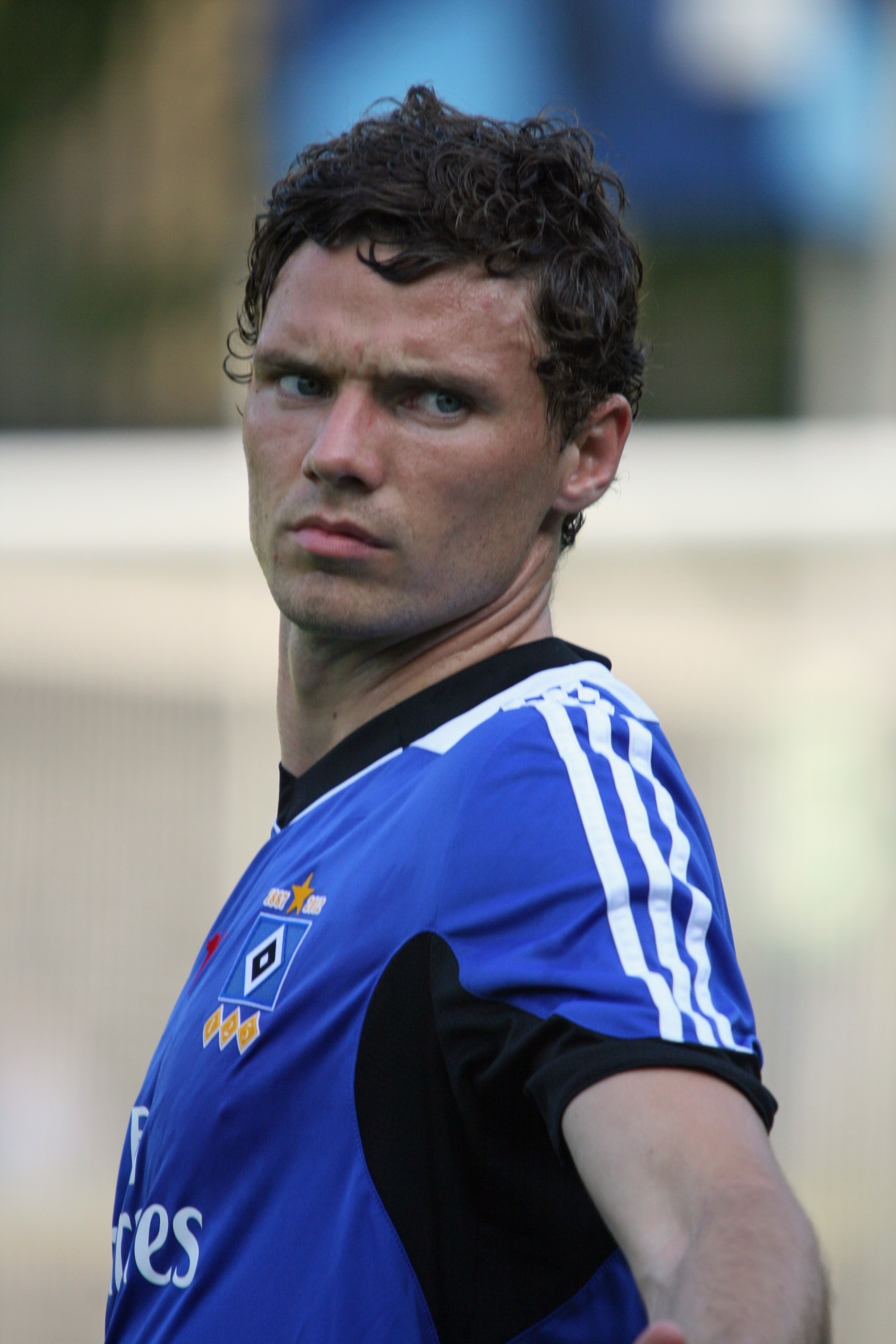
Berg on training with Hamburger SV

On 17 July 2009, German Bundesliga side Hamburger SV confirmed that Berg had signed a five-year contract with the club. The official FC Groningen website mentioned it was a record fee paid for a Groningen player. Dagblad van het Noorden, a Dutch newspaper, stated that Berg swapped clubs for €10.5 million. The contract also mentioned that a friendly match will be played between Groningen and Hamburg in the summer of 2010 or 2011 in the Euroborg, the main stadium of Groningen. Although initially the fee of €9.5 million was too high for Hamburg, Berg's desire of moving to the Bundesliga persuaded Groningen to complete the transfer. In his first Bundesliga game for Hamburg, playing at home against Borussia Dortmund, Berg scored his first goal for the club in the 72nd minute, just 182 seconds after coming off the bench, a record in the club's history. Despite the promising start, his debut season in the Bundesliga would not become a success, with Berg only scoring three additional goals in 30 appearances.

==== 2010–11 season: Loan to PSV ====
On 17 July 2010, PSV and Hamburg agreed to a season-long loan deal for Berg.

==== 2011–12 season: Return from loan ====
After returning from his loan spell at PSV, Berg only made 13 appearances the 2011–12 Bundesliga due to injuries and continued lack of form, scoring once. On 9 November 2012, Hamburger SV athletic supervisor Frank Arnesen stated that the club had to sell five players to raise funds after having invested heavily in new players in the previous summer, including Dutch star Rafael van der Vaart; one of these five players was said to be Berg. After these news, Berg was linked with a return to his former club IFK Göteborg.

=== Panathinaikos ===
On 4 July 2013, it was revealed that Berg had travelled to Athens in order to sign with Panathinaikos. On 8 July 2013, Panathinaikos announced that Berg had signed a four-year contract with the club. On 18 August 2013, in his debut appearance, Berg scored his first goal with Panathinaikos, as his team won the game against Panetolikos. On the first derby of the year against PAOK, Berg scored Panathinaikos' goal and lost a penalty, as his team lost with a score of 2–1. On 2 March 2014, Berg was the MVP in the 3–0 away victory against Olympiacos with one goal and one assist for Danijel Pranjić. This was the biggest away victory in the history of the Eternal Rivals. The following week, he scored a hat-trick when Panathinaikos defeated Aris 4–1 at home.

On 26 April 2014, in the Greek Cup final against rivals PAOK, Berg scored a hat-trick to lead Panathinaikos to a 4–1 victory, who won the Greek Cup as they had done in 2010. On 11 January 2015, Berg scored his second hat-trick in a 5–0 home win against Ergotelis in the Super League Greece. On 26 January 2015, he signed a one-year extension contract, until 2018. On 8 March, in a Panathinaikos–PAOK derby, Berg scored his third hat-trick in a 4–3 home win. On 30 March 2015, after two-and-a-half years, Berg scored his seventh international goal on friendly match against Iran.

On 31 August 2015, Panathinaikos rivals PAOK offered to €2 million for Berg, but the "Greens" turned it down. Additionally, Marseille tried to complete a move for the Swedish striker on the deadline date, however, they were put off by Panathinaikos's price tag.

On 6 September 2015, Berg was left frustrated as he did not start in the line-up for the game against Russia. Sweden lost 1–0 at the hands of Russia with Berg making his appearance for only 30 minutes on the pitch as he started from the bench. Swedish press criticised this decision and Berg demanded first team football in the National Team after the final whistle."Ola Toivonen is a kind of a different player than me and this decision has been taken. But it's pretty clear that I want to play as I'm in a decent form," the Panathinaikos striker underlined straight after the game. On 7 November 2015, he scored the winning goal in the 10th day of the Super League match against Atromitos, It was his 50th goal with the club in all competitions. On 24 January 2016, almost 2.5 months since his last goal in the Super League, Berg scored leading his club to away 2–0 victory against Levadiakos. On 6 March 2016, Swedish striker and fans of Panathinaikos' favorite Berg reached 100 official appearances with the Greek club at a home game against Atromitos. On 19 March 2016, he scored a brace against Iraklis for the Super League. On 17 April 2016, in the last matchday for the 2015–16 season, Berg scored five times (23', 41', 45+2', 51', 62') in his team's 6–1 victory against Panthrakikos. On 18 August 2016, Berg was the scorer of two goals, helping Panathinaikos win the first leg of the UEFA Europa League play offs and is set to qualify for the group stage, as the Greens crushed Danish Brøndby IF 3–0 at Leoforos stadium.

On 6 September 2016, Berg stepped into retired Sweden national team captain Zlatan Ibrahimović's vacant boots to open the scoring in Stockholm just two minutes before the break against Netherlands, as he capitalised on Kevin Strootman's defensive mishap to smash in from outside the box into the top left corner. On 18 September 2016, he was the scorer of two goals, helping the club to achieve a 4–0 home win against PAS Giannina. It was his first goals for the 2016–17 season. On 23 September 2016, Berg extended his three-year contract for an annual fee of €1.1 million and with a €10 million release clause. Panathinaikos has 55% of Berg's rights, Hamburger SV has 45% and the rest 10% belongs to the player. On 19 January, was the scorer of two goals, helping the club, to achieve a 2–1 home win against Platanias, helping the club climbing in the third place of Super League. On 30 January 2017, Panathinaikos announced the agreement for the extension of Berg's contract till the summer of 2019. On 12 February 2017, he was the scorer of three goals in a Super League 4–0 home win against Panetolikos. He was named MVP of the match. On 4 March 2017, with Swedish international striker grabbing a hat-trick (pen. 18', pen. 39', 41'), Panathinaikos won 5–0 against struggling Veria. He became the leading scorer of Super League so far and named MVP of the march. On 11 March 2017, Panathinaikos striker scored his 24th goal into the season breaking his own record since he joined the Greens. The Swedish striker continues to be in great form as he scored once again in Panathinaikos's 1–1 Super League draw with Iraklis. On 19 March 2017, Berg scored for the third time in his "green" career in the derby against Olympiacos in Panathinaikos's win with 1–0 at home. Berg scored twice on 2 April 2017 against AEK Athens in the away win 2–3 in the Athenian derby. On 6 April 2017, Panathinaikos won 1–0 Panionios at Leoforos Stadium, thanks to a penalty kick by Berg. It was the fifth consecutive game that the Swedish international scored. On 30 April 2017, he scored his last goal for the season, in a 2–0 home win against AEL gaining the title of the 2016–17 League top scorer for first time in his Greek career.

On 18 May 2017, the Swedish striker will miss the remainder of Super League play-offs because he will serve four-game suspension. The 31-year-old international and captain of the Greens showed unprofessional behavior on home clash against PAOK (1–0), which was finally interrupted by referee Giorgos Kominis at 55', and will not perform at the four remaining matches.

On 20 June 2017, the Administration of Panathinaikos rejected the first offer of Al Ain FC (€2.5–3 million) about the purchase of experienced Swedish striker. The Greens are holding the 55% of the rights of 31-year-old international (his former team, Hamburger SV, have the other 35%), whose current contract expires in the summer of 2019, with a buy-out clause of €5.2 million, but the negotiations with the UAE club are expected to be continued, while Berg has already agreed to sign a two (plus one) years' season contract with Al Ain, with an annual salary of €3 million after taxes.

=== Al Ain ===
On 28 June 2017, however, Al Ain FC confirmed the move was finalised following lengthy negotiations with Panathinaikos, with the figure believed to be around €3 million. Berg, has agreed to a two-year contract, although there exists an option to renew. He replaces in the squad Saudi Arabia striker Nasser Al-Shamrani. A statement from Panathinaikos read: "Unfortunately, Marcus Berg chose to leave Panathinaikos because he felt that at that time, close to the end of his career, he wanted to get a big financial benefit. There were some misunderstandings during the negotiations. We forget them, as Marcus has offered a lot to Panathinaikos. We wish him good luck in the step he chose and wait for him if he wishes to close his career in our club."

On 16 April 2018, following an incredible season in UAE Pro-League, Berg was twice on target as his club advanced to the last 16 stage of the AFC Champions League with an emphatic 4–1 rout of Qatar's Al Rayyan SC. On 21 April 2018, Al Ain were crowned UAE Pro-League champions for the 13th time in their history thanks to a Marcus Berg's hat-trick in an emphatic 4–0 win over Al Nasr. On 29 April 2018, netting four goals in a glorious 5–0 home win game against Al Dhafra FC, helping his club to win the 2017–18 UAE Pro-League, being the top scorer of the League in his first season.

On 3 May 2018, he scored, making use of a cleverly executed volley pass by the mid-fielder Omar Abdulrahman, the second goal in a 2–1 as Al Ain outlasted Al-Wasl F.C., lifting UAE President's Cup to secure trophy double in UAE Pro-League club's 50th year.

On 18 December 2018, opened the score helping his club through to the 2018 FIFA Club World Cup final as they dumped Copa Libertadores winners River Plate out on penalties in the semi-finals, after a final 2–2 game.

=== Krasnodar ===
On 13 July 2019, Krasnodar announced the signing of the Swedish international until the summer of 2020 and his contract worth €1.9 million. On 15 June 2020, he extended his contract with Krasnodar for a further year. He finished his first season with Krasnodar as the club's top scorer, with 9 in the league and 10 in all competitions, as Krasnodar finished third place and secured a spot in the play-off round of the UEFA Champions League.

Berg scored his first goal of the 2020–21 season in Krasnodar's first league game of the season, a 3–0 victory at FC Ufa on 9 August 2020. Berg featured in both matches of the Champions League play-off tied against PAOK in September 2020 as Krasnodar won 4–2 on aggregate to secure qualification to the group stage for the first time in club history. On 2 December 2020, he scored the only goal in a 1–0 victory over Rennes in the Champions League, their first win in the competition, to qualify Krasnodar for the Europa League.

=== Return to IFK Göteborg ===
On 22 March 2021, it was announced that Berg would return to IFK Göteborg and subsequently Sweden on a free transfer. Signing a two-and-a-half-year contract, he returned effectively on 1 July.

On 25 September 2023, Berg announced his retirement from professional football due to a severe back injury suffered, ending an 18-year long career with over 470 league appearances made.

In February 2024, Berg became a developer as a part of IFK Göteborg men's first-team coaching staff.

== International career ==
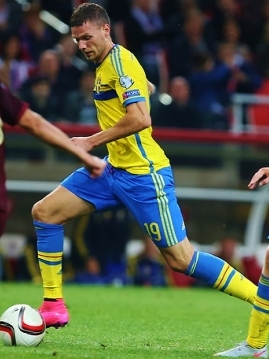
Berg on the ball for Sweden in September 2015

=== Youth ===
Berg started off his international career with the Sweden U19 team for which he scored 3 goals in 8 games. He then went on to represent the Sweden U21 team, for whom he played at the 2009 UEFA European Under-21 Championship on home soil in Sweden. He was a stand-out player at the tournament, scoring 7 goals in 4 games as Sweden was eliminated in the semi-finals by England. After the tournament, UEFA named Berg the Player of the Tournament and his 7 goals won him the tournament's Golden Boot. His 7 goals in the tournament is also a record, breaking the previous record of four goals held jointly by Alberto Gilardino, Klaas-Jan Huntelaar and Maceo Rigters. The record has since been equalled by Luca Waldschmidt.

=== Senior ===
==== Early career ====
Berg was first approached to the Sweden senior team in February 2008 where he was called for a friendly versus Turkey; he made his debut on that match by playing full-90 minutes as the friendly ended in a goalless draw. He was omitted from the team later in June of that year for the UEFA Euro 2008.

Berg was called-up regularly during Sweden's 2010 FIFA World Cup qualifying campaign. He scored his first goal for the team on 10 June 2009 in the 4–0 home win over Malta. He was on the score sheet also in the final match day against Albania, netting the second in an eventual 4–1 home win, which was not enough to secure Sweden a place at the tournament. With 2 goals, he was Sweden's joint second top goalscorer along with Zlatan Ibrahimović and behind Olof Mellberg.

Berg managed only two appearances at UEFA Euro 2012 qualifying, both of them as substitute, recording only 19 minutes on the field. He scored one goal, the last of the 6–0 home win over San Marino on 7 September 2010. Sweden finished Group E as runner-up which was enough for a place at final tournament, which Berg missed out.

At 2014 FIFA World Cup qualification, Berg was part of the team only in the first Group C matches; he made only two appearances, both as replacement, netting only one time in the 2–0 home win over Kazakhstan on 11 September 2012. Sweden finished second in Group C which secured them a spot at second round where they were eliminated by Portugal 4–2 on aggregate.

==== UEFA Euro 2016 ====
Berg scored two goals in the Group G of UEFA Euro 2016 qualifying; the first came on 14 June 2015 in form of an opener in the 3–1 win over Montenegro while the second came in the 0–2 win at Liechtenstein on 9 October of that year. At play-off round, Berg made two appearances as Sweden eliminated the rivals of Denmark 4–3 on aggregate to secure a spot at UEFA European Championship for the 5th consecutive edition.

On 11 May 2016, Berg was called by manager Erik Hamrén for the UEFA Euro 2016 which was his first major tournament. He started in the opening Group E match versus Republic of Ireland on 13 June, playing for 59 minutes as the match ended in a 1–1 draw. Berg also appeared in the remaining matches as Sweden lost to both Italy and Belgium which brought the elimination from the tournament.

==== 2018 FIFA World Cup ====
Berg was Sweden's main striker during the 2018 FIFA World Cup qualification after the retirement of Zlatan Ibrahimović. He scored his first goal in the qualifiers on 6 September 2016, the opener of the 1–1 home draw against the Netherlands. On 7 October 2017, Berg scored four goals as Sweden ran riot in front of a record crowd of 50,022 at the Friends Arena, hammering Luxembourg 8–0, in their biggest win in 79 years, to make a great step to the 2018 FIFA World Cup finals. It was also his 50th international appearance. Sweden eventually finished Group A on second place with 19 points with Berg as top goalscorer with 8 goals. At second round, Sweden faced Italy and eliminated them 1–0, returning at the World Cup for the first time since 2006; Berg was distinguished for his defensive work rate in the second leg.

In May 2018 he was named in Sweden's squad for the 2018 FIFA World Cup in Russia. Berg started in all five games for Sweden – but failed to score – as they were eliminated by England in the quarter final.

==== UEFA Euro 2020 and UEFA Nations League ====
On 15 October 2019, Berg scored his 20th senior international goal for Sweden in a 1–1 draw in a UEFA Euro 2020 qualifying game against Spain. On 8 September 2020 in a 2020–21 UEFA Nations League game against Portugal, Berg served as Sweden's team captain for the first time.

In May 2021, he was named in Sweden's squad for UEFA Euro 2020. Following Sweden's opening game in Euro 2020 against Spain in Seville, Berg became subject to severe online abuse and hatred after missing a chance to score. The Swedish FA responded by reporting the abuse to the police.

On 9 July 2021, Berg announced his retirement from international football. He won a total of 90 caps and scored 24 goals for Sweden across 13 total years.

== Style of play ==
Berg was renowned for his heading ability, first touches, and being able to shoot and pass with both his right and left foot. He was also known for his tactical dribbles and scoring from unusual angles. Berg scored 15 goals in his first season in the Eredivisie, having only played 25 matches due to having a back-strain injury. In his second season for Groningen, he scored 13 goals in the first 15 matches and was by then the second highest goalscorer in the league. He also showed his scoring ability in the 2009 UEFA European Under-21 Championship, which he scored a record-breaking seven goals in four matches. His exceptional performance earned him the player of the tournament award.

== Career statistics ==
=== Club ===
Appearances and goals by club, season and competition
Club	Season	League			National cup		Continental		Other		Total	
Club	Season	Division	Apps	Goals	Apps	Goals	Apps	Goals	Apps	Goals	Apps	Goals
Torsby IF	2000	Division 5 Värmland Västra	1		—		—		—		1	
Torsby IF	2001	Division 4 Värmland	10		—		—		—		10	
Torsby IF	2002	Division 4 Värmland	2		—		—		—		2	
Torsby IF	2003	Division 4 Värmland	11		—		—		—		11	
Torsby IF	Total		24		0	0	0	0	0	0	24	
IFK Göteborg	2005	Allsvenskan	14	3	1	0	6 (Note: Appearances in UEFA Intertoto Cup)	4	2 (Note: Appearances in Royal League)	0	23	7
IFK Göteborg	2006	Allsvenskan	22	4	2	1	2 (Note: Appearances in UEFA Cup)	0	4	1	30	6
IFK Göteborg	2007	Allsvenskan	17	14	3	4	—		—		20	18
IFK Göteborg	Total		53	21	6	5	8	4	6	1	73	31
Groningen	2007–08	Eredivisie	25	15	1	0	1	0	4 (Note: Appearances in Eredivisie play-offs)	3	31	18
Groningen	2008–09	Eredivisie	31	17	3	4	—		4	5	38	26
Groningen	Total		56	32	4	4	1	0	8	8	69	44
Hamburger SV	2009–10	Bundesliga	30	4	1	0	13 (Note: Appearances in UEFA Europa League)	6	—		44	10
Hamburger SV	2011–12	Bundesliga	13	1	1	1	—		—		14	2
Hamburger SV	2012–13	Bundesliga	11	0	1	1	—		—		12	1
Hamburger SV	Total		54	5	3	2	13	6	0	0	70	13
PSV (loan)	2010–11	Eredivisie	25	8	3	1	13	2	—		41	11
Panathinaikos	2013–14	Super League Greece	35	16	5	7	—		—		40	23
Panathinaikos	2014–15	Super League Greece	24	16	3	1	6 (Note: Two appearances in UEFA Champions League, four appearances and fives goals in UEFA Europa League)	5	—		33	22
Panathinaikos	2015–16	Super League Greece	26	17	4	0	4 (Note: Two appearances and one goal in UEFA Champions League, two appearances and one goal in UEFA Europa League)	2	—		34	19
Panathinaikos	2016–17	Super League Greece	30	24	7	3	7	4	—		44	31
Panathinaikos	Total		115	73	19	11	17	11	0	0	151	95
Al Ain	2017–18	UAE Pro League	21	25	3	3	10 (Note: Appearances in AFC Champions League)	7	2 (Note: Appearances in UAE League Cup)	1	36	36
Al Ain	2018–19	UAE Pro League	20	10	1	0	6	2	6 (Note: One appearance and one goal in UAE Super Cup, four appearances and two goals in FIFA Club World Cup, one appearance in UAE League Cup)	3	33	15
Al Ain	Total		41	35	4	3	16	9	8	4	69	51
Krasnodar	2019–20	Russian Premier League	23	9	1	0	8 (Note: Four appearances in UEFA Champions League, four appearances and one goal in UEFA Europa League)	1	—		32	10
Krasnodar	2020–21	Russian Premier League	21	9	1	0	9 (Note: Eight appearances and two goals in UEFA Champions League, one appearance and one goal in UEFA Europa League)	3	—		31	12
Krasnodar	Total		44	18	2	0	17	4	0	0	63	22
IFK Göteborg	2021	Allsvenskan	18	10	0	0	—		—		18	10
IFK Göteborg	2022	Allsvenskan	26	13	4	1	—		—		30	14
IFK Göteborg	2023	Allsvenskan	21	7	3	0	—		—		24	7
IFK Göteborg	Total		65	30	7	1	0	0	0	0	72	31
Career total			477	222	48	27	85	36	22	13	632	298

=== International ===
Appearances and goals by national team and year
National team	Year	Apps	Goals
Sweden	2008	3	0
Sweden	2009	9	2
Sweden	2010	6	2
Sweden	2011	1	1
Sweden	2012	4	1
Sweden	2013	0	0
Sweden	2014	3	0
Sweden	2015	9	3
Sweden	2016	9	2
Sweden	2017	9	7
Sweden	2018	14	1
Sweden	2019	9	2
Sweden	2020	6	1
Sweden	2021	8	2
Total		90	24

Sweden's score is listed first, and the score column indicates the score after each Berg goal.

International goals by date, venue, cap, opponent, score, result and competition
No.	Date	Venue	Cap	Opponent	Score	Result	Competition
1	10 June 2009	Ullevi, Gothenburg, Sweden	7	Malta	4–0	4–0	2010 FIFA World Cup qualification
2	14 October 2009	Råsunda Stadium, Solna, Sweden	12	Albania	2–0	4–1	2010 FIFA World Cup qualification
3	29 May 2010	Råsunda Stadium, Solna, Sweden	13	Bosnia and Herzegovina	4–2	4–2	Friendly
4	7 September 2010	Swedbank Stadion, Malmö, Sweden	16	San Marino	6–0	6–0	UEFA Euro 2012 qualifying
5	8 February 2011	GSP Stadium, Nicosia, Cyprus	19	Cyprus	2–0	2–0	2011 Cyprus International Football Tournament
6	11 September 2012	Swedbank Stadion, Malmö, Sweden	22	Kazakhstan	2–0	2–0	2014 FIFA World Cup qualification
7	31 March 2015	Friends Arena, Solna, Sweden	28	Iran	2–0	3–1	Friendly
8	14 June 2015	Friends Arena, Solna, Sweden	30	Montenegro	1–0	3–1	UEFA Euro 2016 qualifying
9	9 October 2015	Rheinpark Stadion, Vaduz, Liechtenstein	33	Liechtenstein	1–0	2–0	UEFA Euro 2016 qualifying
10	29 March 2016	Friends Arena, Solna, Sweden	37	Czech Republic	1–0	1–1	Friendly
11	6 September 2016	Friends Arena, Solna, Sweden	42	Netherlands	1–0	1–1	2018 FIFA World Cup qualification
12	25 March 2017	Friends Arena, Solna, Sweden	46	Belarus	3–0	4–0	2018 FIFA World Cup qualification
13	31 August 2017	Vasil Levski National Stadium, Sofia, Bulgaria	48	Bulgaria	2–2	2–3	2018 FIFA World Cup qualification
14	3 September 2017	Borisov Arena, Barysaw, Belarus	49	Belarus	3–0	4–0	2018 FIFA World Cup qualification
15	7 October 2017	Friends Arena, Solna, Sweden	50	Luxembourg	2–0	8–0	2018 FIFA World Cup qualification
16	7 October 2017	Friends Arena, Solna, Sweden	50	Luxembourg	3–0	8–0	2018 FIFA World Cup qualification
17	7 October 2017	Friends Arena, Solna, Sweden	50	Luxembourg	4–0	8–0	2018 FIFA World Cup qualification
18	7 October 2017	Friends Arena, Solna, Sweden	50	Luxembourg	7–0	8–0	2018 FIFA World Cup qualification
19	20 November 2018	Friends Arena, Solna, Sweden	67	Russia	2–0	2–0	2018–19 UEFA Nations League B
20	15 October 2019	Friends Arena, Solna, Sweden	75	Spain	1–0	1–1	UEFA Euro 2020 qualifying
21	15 November 2019	Arena Națională, Bucharest, Romania	76	Romania	1–0	2–0	UEFA Euro 2020 qualifying
22	11 October 2020	Stadion Maksimir, Zagreb, Croatia	79	Croatia	1–1	1–2	2020–21 UEFA Nations League A
23	31 March 2021	Friends Arena, Solna, Sweden	84	Estonia	1–0	1–0	Friendly
24	5 June 2021	Friends Arena, Solna, Sweden	86	Armenia	3–1	3–1	Friendly

== Honours ==
IFK Göteborg

- Allsvenskan: 2007

Panathinaikos

- Greek Cup: 2013–14

Al Ain FC

- UAE Pro-League: 2017–18
- UAE President's Cup: 2017–18
- FIFA Club World Cup runner-up: 2018

Sweden U21

- UEFA European Under-21 Championship bronze: 2009

Individual

- Allsvenskan top scorer: 2007 (shared with Razak Omotoyossi)
- UEFA European Under-21 Championship Golden Boot: 2009
- UEFA European Under-21 Championship Player of the Tournament: 2009
- Super League Greece Best Foreign Player: 2013–14, 2015–16, 2016–17
- Super League Greece Golden Boot: 2016–17 (22 goals)
- Super League Greece Player of the Season: 2016–17
- Super League Greece Team of the Season: 2013–14, 2015–16, 2016–17
- Greek Cup Top Scorer: 2013–14 (7 goals)
- UAE Pro-League Golden Boot: 2017–18 (25 goals)
- Årets Ärkeängel: 2022
