= 2006 IFK Göteborg season =

IFK Göteborg
2006 season
- Manager: Arne Erlandsen; Reine Almqvist
- Allsvenskan: 8th
- UEFA Cup: 1st Qualifying Round
- Svenska Cupen: Quarter-final
- Top goalscorer: Pontus Wernbloom (6)

IFK Göteborg had a largely disappointing season, finishing in the bottom half of Allsvenskan, also letting go of highly rated Norwegian coach Arne Erlandsen, only for his successor Reine Almqvist to endure an even worse run of results, which saw him being let go after the season, too.

The club was also embroiled in controversy, as Peter Ijeh and Stefan Selaković were among with club director Mats Persson and an accountant trialled for tax evasion with regard to sign-on fees. In the end, Persson was sentenced to jail, while Selaković escaped that punishment, but was still convicted.

== Squad ==
=== Goalkeepers ===
- (Sweden) Bengt Andersson
- (Sweden) Richard Richardsson

=== Defenders ===
- (Uruguay) Alejandro Lago
- (Argentina) José Shaffer
- (Sweden) Adam Johansson
- (Sweden) Gustav Svensson
- (Iceland) Hjálmar Jónsson
- (Sweden) Dennis Jonsson
- (Sweden) Karl Svensson
- (Sweden) Mattias Bjärsmyr

=== Midfielders ===
- (Sweden) Thomas Olsson
- (Sweden) Magnus Kihlberg
- (Sweden) Martin Ulander
- (Sweden) Niclas Alexandersson
- (Sweden) Pontus Wernbloom
- (Sweden) Andrés Vasquez
- (Sweden) Samuel Wowoah

=== Attackers ===
- (Sweden) Stefan Selaković
- (Sweden) George Mourad
- (Sweden) Jonas Wallerstedt
- (Canada) Ali Gerba
- (Sweden) Marcus Berg

== Allsvenskan ==
=== Matches ===
- IFK Göteborg-Öster 0-0
- Elfsborg-IFK Göteborg 1-1
- 1-0 Samuel Holmén 39'
- 1-1 Karl Svensson 90'
- IFK Göteborg-Helsingborg 2-2
- 0-1 Olivier Karekezi 15'
- 0-2 McDonald Mariga 18'
- 1-2 Thomas Olsson 25'
- 2-2 Jonas Wallerstedt 47'
- Djurgården-IFK Göteborg 1-0
- 1-0 Mattias Jonson 81'
- IFK Göteborg-Hammarby 1-2
- 0-1 Björn Runström 8'
- 0-2 Björn Runström 69'
- 1-2 Karl Svensson 88'
- GAIS-IFK Göteborg 1-2
- 0-1 Karl Svensson 32'
- 0-2 Pontus Wernbloom 41'
- 1-2 Jóhann Gudmundsson 52'
- IFK Göteborg-Häcken 3-0
- 1-0 Dennis Jonsson 3'
- 2-0 Stefan Selaković 12'
- 3-0 Pontus Wernbloom 38'
- IFK Göteborg-Örgryte 2-1
- 1-0 Magnus Kihlberg 9'
- 1-1 Ola Toivonen 31'
- 2-1 Stefan Selaković 60'
- IFK Göteborg-Malmö FF 1-0
- 1-0 Thomas Olsson 56'
- Halmstad-IFK Göteborg 1-4
- 0-1 George Mourad 5'
- 1-1 Magnus Arvidsson 11'
- 1-2 Hjálmar Jónsson 40'
- 1-3 Pontus Wernbloom 56'
- 1-4 George Mourad 82'
- Kalmar FF-IFK Göteborg 1-2
- 0-1 Pontus Wernbloom 24'
- 1-1 Viktor Elm 52'
- 1-2 Pontus Wernbloom 89'
- IFK Göteborg-AIK 1-1
- 1-0 Alejandro Lago 27'
- 1-1 Daniel Mendes 77'
- IFK Göteborg-Gefle 3-1
- 1-0 George Mourad 9'
- 1-1 René Makondele 16'
- 2-1 George Mourad 32'
- 3-1 Alejandro Lago 84'
- Gefle-IFK Göteborg 1-0
- 1-0 René Makondele 70'
- Öster-IFK Göteborg 1-1
- 1-0 Ingmar Teever 64'
- 1-1 Magnus Kihlberg 84'
- IFK Göteborg-Elfsborg 1-1
- 0-1 Stefan Ishizaki 38'
- 1-1 Gustaf Svensson 83'
- Häcken-IFK Göteborg 1-4
- 0-1 Marcus Berg 17'
- 0-2 Stefan Selaković 30'
- 0-3 Jonas Wallerstedt 65'
- 0-4 Jonas Wallerstedt 72'
- 1-4 Daniel Larsson 89'
- Örgryte-IFK Göteborg 3-2
- 1-0 Ola Toivonen 23'
- 1-1 Marcus Berg 31'
- 2-1 Aílton Almeida 47'
- 3-1 Magnus Källander 50'
- 3-2 Marcus Berg 64'
- Hammarby-IFK Göteborg 3-3
- 0-1 Marcus Berg 26'
- 1-1 Fredrik Stoor 36'
- 2-1 Paulinho Guará 41'
- 2-2 Thomas Olsson 54'
- 3-2 Pablo Piñones-Arce 63'
- 3-3 own goal 87' (o.g.)
- IFK Göteborg-GAIS 0-0
- Helsingborg-IFK Göteborg 3-2
- 1-0 Fredrik Svanbäck 13'
- 2-0 Babis Stefanidis 32'
- 3-0 Henrik Larsson 40'
- 3-1 Stefan Selaković 89'
- 3-2 Pontus Wernbloom 90'
- IFK Göteborg-Djurgården 3-2
- 1-0 Stefan Selaković 12'
- 1-1 Mattias Jonson 29'
- 1-2 Lance Davids 36'
- 2-2 Jonas Wallerstedt 70'
- 3-2 Thomas Olsson 90'
- IFK Göteborg-Kalmar FF 0-3
- 0-1 Ari 28'
- 0-2 César Santín 50'
- 0-3 Viktor Elm 72'
- AIK-IFK Göteborg 4-0
- 1-0 Mats Rubarth 6'
- 2-0 Markus Jonsson 33' (pen.)
- 3-0 Daniel Tjernström 65'
- 4-0 Wílton Figueiredo 78'
- Malmö FF-IFK Göteborg 2-1
- 1-0 Júnior 72'
- 2-0 Júnior 76'
- 2-1 Samuel Wowoah 81'
- IFK Göteborg-Halmstad 0-0

=== Topscorers ===
- (Sweden) Pontus Wernbloom 6
- (Sweden) Jonas Wallerstedt 4
- (Sweden) Stefan Selaković 4
- (Sweden) George Mourad 4
- (Sweden) Thomas Olsson 3
- (Sweden) Karl Svensson 3
- (Sweden) Marcus Berg 3

== Sources ==
- Playing Schedule - Allsvenskan 2006 (Swedish)
- FootballSquads - IFK Göteborg 2006
