= Spyros Risvanis =

Greek footballer (born 1994)

Personal information
- Full name: Spyridon Risvanis
- Date of birth: 3 January 1994 (age 32)
- Place of birth: Kalamata, Greece
- Height: 1.96 m (6 ft 5 in)
- Position: Centre-back

Team information
- Current team: AEL
- Number: 88

Youth career
- 2005–2013: Panathinaikos

Senior career*
Years	Team	Apps	(Gls)
2013–2015	Panathinaikos	18	(0)
2015	→ Panionios (loan)	11	(0)
2015–2017	Panionios	61	(4)
2017–2018	Olympiacos	0	(0)
2017–2018	→ Atromitos (loan)	26	(0)
2018–2021	Atromitos	64	(3)
2021–2022	Anorthosis Famagusta	32	(0)
2022–2023	DAC Dunajská Streda	26	(0)
2024	Slovan Bratislava	2	(0)
2025	Michalovce	5	(0)
2025–2026	Enosis Neon Paralimni	13	(0)
2026–	AEL	2	(0)

International career^{‡}
2015–2016	Greece U21	11	(0)
2018	Greece	1	(0)
- * Club domestic league appearances and goals as of 12 September 2026 ‡ National team caps and goals as of 16 May 2018

Spyros Risvanis (Greek: Σπύρος Ρισβάνης; born 3 January 1994) is a Greek professional footballer who plays as a centre-back for Super League 2 club AEL.

== Club career ==
On 30 July 2013, Risvanis signed his first professional contract with Panathinaikos along with two other players. On 15 September 2013, he made his professional debut in a draw in a match against Platanias. On 2 January 2015, he signed a contract for six months with Panionios, on loan from Panathinaikos.

On 19 July 2015, Panathinaikos released the player who signed a two years' contract to Panionios, but in order to be certain of the benefits received in a possible future transfer to a bigger club, put a 25% resale percentage for the next three transfer periods, and up to 31 December 2016, reserves the right to "tie" any proposal that would accept Panionios. Moreover, if his club sell him to either Olympiacos or AEK Athens or PAOK within the next two transfer periods, Panathinaikos will receive €1 million. On 3 January 2016, he scored his first goal in the Super League in the second half helping his club to temporarily equalizing the score in a 3–1 home loss against champions Olympiacos.

He started the 2016–17 season as the undisputed leader of the club's defense. He scored his first goal of the season in a 2–0 away win against rivals Xanthi. On 10 April 2017, Nikos Zamanis, the Athletic Manager of Panionios has announced that the player had signed a contract with champions Olympiacos. On 4 July 2017, after the first stage of preparation, Risvanis was not in the plans of Olympiacos' coach Besnik Hasi, with the Greek defender looking abroad as the next step in his career, on a loan season basis.

On 16 July 2017, the talented central defender is expected to continue his career elsewhere, on loan until the end of 2017–18 season. The 23-year-old player is not in the season plans of Albanian manager of the Reds, Besnik Hasi, and will probably have to leave the club and his motherland for the first time in his career, in order to have more playing time. On 26 August 2017, Risvanis joined Atromitos on a season-long loan. Atromitos signed him permanently on 29 May 2018 as part of an exchange deal with Olympiacos for the transfer of goalkeeper Andreas Gianniotis to the Reds.

On 11 November 2018, he scored his first goal with the club in a 2–0 away win against reigning Super League champions AEK Athens at a deserted Olympic Stadium. Two minutes before the final whistle, Risvanis rose highest to connect with a pinpoint corner, heading beyond the stricken Vasilis Barkas and opened the score. On 1 August 2019, Risvanis scored his first European goal with the head the qualifying goal after an assist from Argentinian midfielder Javier Umbides, helping his club reach the UEFA Europa League third qualifying round thanks to a thrilling 3–2 home win over Dunajská Streda at the Peristeri Stadium which gave the Athens club a 5–3 aggregate success. On 21 September 2019, he scored the only goal after an Alexandros Katranis assist in an away 2–1 loss against Asteras Tripolis.

On 5 January 2021, Spyros Risvanis after 3.5 years and 107 appearances in all competitions solved his contract with Atromitos and is immediately expected to sign for Cypriot club Anortosis Famagustra.

== International career ==
On 15 May 2018 he made his debut in the Greece national team in a 2–0 friendly match against Saudi Arabia. On 16 November 2018, in the last game for the UEFA Nations League against Estonia, Risvanis was called up to take Kostas Manolas' place in the roster, as the latter suffered two days earlier an injury during Nations League match at home to Finland and was subbed off in the first half.

== Career statistics ==
As of 12 May 2022

Club	Season	League			National Cup		Continental		Total	
Club	Season	Division	Apps	Goals	Apps	Goals	Apps	Goals	Apps	Goals
Panathinaikos	2013–14	Super League Greece	16	0	3	0	—		19	0
Panathinaikos	2014–15	Super League Greece	2	0	1	0	2	0	5	0
Panathinaikos	Total		18	0	4	0	2	0	24	0
Panionios (loan)	2014–15	Super League Greece	11	0	3	0	—		14	0
Panionios	2015–16	Super League Greece	31	1	4	0	—		35	1
Panionios	2016–17	Super League Greece	30	3	0	0	—		30	3
Panionios	Total		61	4	4	0	—		65	4
Atromitos (loan)	2017–18	Super League Greece	26	0	5	0	—		31	0
Atromitos	2018–19	Super League Greece	28	1	6	0	2	0	36	1
Atromitos	2019–20	Super League Greece	27	2	0	0	4	1	31	3
Atromitos	2020–21	Super League Greece	9	0	—		—		9	0
Atromitos	Total		90	3	11	0	6	1	107	4
Anorthosis	2020–21	Cypriot First Division	16	0	5	0	—		21	0
Anorthosis	2021–22	Cypriot First Division	16	0	4	0	8	0	28	0
Anorthosis	Total		32	0	9	0	8	0	49	0
DAC Dunajská Streda	2022–23	Slovak First Football League	18	0	0	0	3	0	21	0
DAC Dunajská Streda	2023–24	Slovak First Football League	0	0	0	0	2	0	2	0
DAC Dunajská Streda	Total		18	0	0	0	5	0	23	0
Career total			230	7	31	0	19	1	282	8

== Honours ==
=== Club ===
Panathinaikos

- Greek Cup: 2013–14

Anorthosis Famagusta

- Cypriot Cup: 2020–21

=== Individual ===
- Super League Greece Team of the Season: 2018–19, 2019–20
