= Alexandros Mouzakitis =

Greek footballer

Personal information
- Full name: Alexandros Spyridon Mouzakitis
- Date of birth: 4 August 1994 (age 32)
- Place of birth: Southport, England
- Height: 1.70 m (5 ft 7 in)
- Position: Winger

Team information
- Current team: Thinaliakos

Youth career
- 2008–2010: Olympiacos
- 2010–2012: Panathinaikos

Senior career*
Years	Team	Apps	(Gls)
2012–2015	Panathinaikos	2	(0)
2014	→ Niki Volos (loan)	10	(0)
2015	Panionios	0	(0)
2016–2017	Monopoli 1966	8	(1)
2017	Sparta	6	(0)
2018	Sparta	12	(1)
2018–2019	Kronos Argyrades		
2019–2020	PAS Acheron Kanallaki		
2020–2021	Ypsonas FC	27	(4)
2021–2022	Aiolikos	14	(0)
2022–2023	AE Rodos	20	(0)
2023–2024	AE Lefkimmi	19	(2)
2024–2025	Asteras Petriti		
2025–2026	Olympiada Karousades		
2026–	Thinaliakos		

International career
2010–2011	Greece U17	4	(0)
2011–2012	Greece U19	3	(0)
- * Club domestic league appearances and goals as of 18:23, 2 June 2024 (UTC)

Alexandros Spyridon Mouzakitis (Greek: Αλέξανδρος Σπυρίδων Μουζακίτης; born 4 August 1994) is a Greek footballer who plays as a winger for Thinaliakos.

== Career ==
On 19 October 2012, Mouzakitis along with three other players, signed his first professional contract with Panathinaikos On 19 December 2012, he made his professional debut with Panathinaikos. Then, in 2014, he went on loan to Niki Volos In January 2015, after contract termination with Panathinaikos, he joined Panionios F.C. where he spent the rest of the season. Spending 1 year without a club, Mouzakitis joined S.S. Monopoli 1966 in July 2016. In the January 2017 transfer window, Mouzakitis joined A.E. Sparta P.A.E. In January 2018, he was signed by A.E. Sparta P.A.E. for a second time where he spent the remaining of the season into. He then joined A.P.S. Kronos Argyrades F.C. during the summer of 2018, PAS Acheron Kanallaki F.C. in September 2019, Ypsonas FC in 2020, Aiolikos F.C. in 2021 and in August 2022 he joined A.E. Rodos.

== Honours ==
Panathinaikos

- Greek Cup: 2013–14
