= Vangelis Anastasopoulos =

Greek footballer

Personal information
- Full name: Evangelos Anastasopoulos
- Date of birth: 7 March 1994 (age 32)
- Place of birth: Pyrgos, Elis, Greece
- Height: 1.66 m (5 ft 5 in)
- Position: Defensive midfielder

Team information
- Current team: Panthrakikos
- Number: 27

Youth career
- Panathinaikos

Senior career*
Years	Team	Apps	(Gls)
2013–2015	Panathinaikos	0	(0)
2014	→ Niki Volos (loan)	4	(1)
2015	Lamia	2	(0)
2015–2017	Sparta	29	(1)
2017–2018	Trikala	0	(0)
2018	Panserraikos	17	(0)
2018–2020	Ierapetra	21	(1)
2020–2021	Chania	12	(0)
2021–2022	Asteras Vlachioti	30	(2)
2022–2023	Anagennisi Karditsa	25	(0)
2023–2024	Kozani	28	(0)
2024–2025	Anagennisi Karditsa		
2025–2026	Nea Artaki		
2026–	Panthrakikos		

International career^{‡}
2010–2011	Greece U17	6	(1)
- * Club domestic league appearances and goals as of 22 May 2024 ‡ National team caps and goals as of 28 March 2011

Vangelis Anastasopoulos (Greek: Βαγγέλης Αναστασόπουλος; born 7 March 1994) is a Greek professional footballer who plays as a defensive midfielder for Super League 2 club Panthrakikos.

== Honours ==
Panathinaikos

- Greek Cup: 2013–14

Sparta

- Gamma Ethniki: 2015–16

Ierapetra

- Gamma Ethniki: 2018–19
