= Konstantinos Apostolopoulos =

Greek footballer (born 1993)

Personal information
- Date of birth: 8 July 1993 (age 33)
- Place of birth: Greece
- Height: 1.73 m (5 ft 8 in)
- Position: Forward

Youth career
- 2003–2012: Panathinaikos

Senior career*
Years	Team	Apps	(Gls)
2012–2014	Panathinaikos	2	(0)
2014	→ Panachaiki (loan)	7	(0)
2014–2015	Union Saint-Gilloise	10	(1)
2015–2016	OFI	0	(0)
2016	Acharnaikos	23	(0)
2016–2017	Chania	30	(7)
2017–2018	Panachaiki	21	(3)
2018–2019	AO Chania Kissamikos	16	(1)
2019–2020	Ierapetra	18	(4)
2020–2021	Veria	12	(0)
2021–2023	Aiolikos	47	(21)
2023–2024	Panachaiki	11	(1)
2024	Agios Nikolaos		
- * Club domestic league appearances and goals as of 9 December 2023

Konstantinos Apostolopoulos (Greek: Κωνσταντίνος Αποστολόπουλος; born 8 July 1993) is a Greek professional footballer who plays as striker.

== Career ==
On 29 November 2012, during a Greek Cup match vs. Proodeftiki, he made his official debut for the men's team with Panathinaikos. On 2014 joins Panachaiki as a loan transfer from Panathinaikos

In September 2016 signs with Chania and becoming one of the best players for Chania

On 29 July 2017, after a great season for Chania with 7 goals and 8 assists, he joined Panachaiki. On 5 November 207 he made his debut and scored a brace in a 3–0 away win against Kallithea. On 3 December 2017 he scored the only goal in a 1–0 home win against Doxa Drama.
