= Anastasios Lagos =

Greek footballer

Tasos Lagos
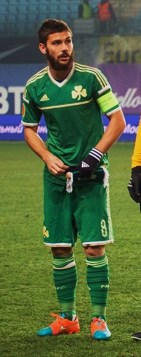
- Lagos with Panathinaikos in 2014

Personal information
- Full name: Anastasios Lagos
- Date of birth: 12 April 1992 (age 34)
- Place of birth: Almyros, Magnesia, Greece
- Height: 1.78 m (5 ft 10 in)
- Position: Defensive midfielder

Team information
- Current team: Olympiacos Volos

Youth career
- –2011: Panathinaikos

Senior career*
Years	Team	Apps	(Gls)
2011–2016	Panathinaikos	87	(5)
2016–2017	Würzburger Kickers	5	(0)
2017–2018	AEL	19	(0)
2019	Ermis Aradippou	14	(0)
2019–2021	Apollon Smyrnis	23	(0)
2021–2023	Anagennisi Karditsa	41	(4)
2023–2024	Aiolikos	3	(0)
2024	Kavala		
2024–2025	Pierikos		
2025–	Olympiacos Volos		

International career
2009–2010	Greece U17	6	(0)
2010–2011	Greece U19	10	(0)
2011–2014	Greece U21	27	(0)
- * Club domestic league appearances and goals as of 15 June 2023

Anastasios "Tasos" Lagos (Greek: Αναστάσιος "Τάσος" Λαγός; born 12 April 1992) is a Greek professional footballer who plays as a midfielder for Thessaly FCA First Division club Olympiacos Volos.

== Club career ==
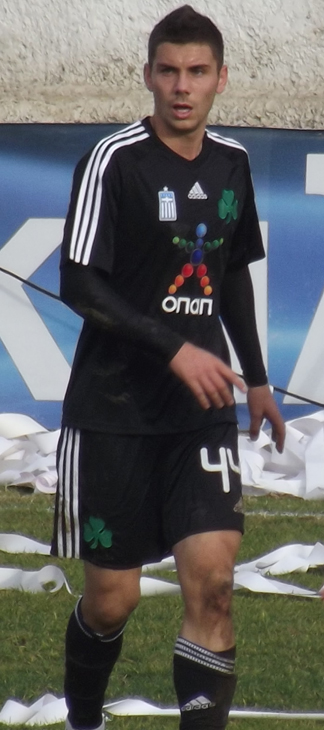
Anastasios Lagos playing for Panathinaikos against Agrotikos Asteras

The young defensive midfielder has joined the academy of Panathinaikos, coming from Almyros. In 2007, he passed the doors of club's youth academy Paiania Athletic Center. Lagos was a player for several years in the youth teams of Panathinaikos, making many appearances for Greece U19 and Greece U17 squads.

In 2007–08 season, José Peseiro was the first coach that promote him in the first team, while a few years later in the summer of 2011, was invited to Everton's training ground, to meet manager Sven-Göran Eriksson and his coaching staff. Moreover, he also came to the attention of Tottenham's manager Harry Redknapp who invited him for another trial.

Even if those trials were not successful, Lagos started to leave his sign. However, the largest step in his career was in the Greek Cup. It was 20 December 2011 in a match, against the Agrotikos Asteras, when Giorgos Karagounis suffered a small injury problem and Lagos entered the match as a substitute. Since then, the young midfielder became gradually member of the first team, with Jesualdo Ferreira giving him the opportunity to make his debut on 24 March 2012 in a Super League away game against OFI coming as a substitute. On 8 November 2012, he made the international debut with the club, in a UEFA Europa League away game against S.S. Lazio.

Lagos responded positively to the proposal to extend his contract with Panathinaikos until 2017 and will be considered as a member of the club for the next three years, completing a decade with the club.

On 3 October 2015, Lagos reached 100 appearances with the jersey of Panathinaikos.

On 25 June 2016, Zweite Bundesliga club Würzburger Kickers officially announced the signing of Panathinaikos' defensive midfielder until the summer of 2017.

On 24 August 2017, he signed a two years contract with Super League club AEL. On 3 April 2018, AEL board announced the termination of his contract and released him as a free transfer.

On 10 January 2019, he travelled to Cyprus to complete a move to Ermis Aradippou. On 25 June 2019, Apollon Smyrnis announced the signing of the Greek midfielder for an undisclosed fee. On 6 August 2021, he signed a contract with Super League Greece 2 club Anagennisi Karditsa as a free transfer.

== Career statistics ==
As of 19 December 2021

Club	Season	League			Cup		Continental		Other		Total	
Club	Season	Division	Apps	Goals	Apps	Goals	Apps	Goals	Apps	Goals	Apps	Goals
Panathinaikos	2011–12	Superleague Greece	1	0	1	0	—		—		2	0
Panathinaikos	2012–13	Superleague Greece	5	0	2	0	1	0	—		8	0
Panathinaikos	2013–14	Superleague Greece	32	3	6	0	—		—		38	3
Panathinaikos	2014–15	Superleague Greece	34	2	5	0	8	0	—		47	2
Panathinaikos	2015–16	Superleague Greece	15	0	6	0	4	0	—		25	0
Panathinaikos	Total		87	5	20	0	13	0	—		120	5
Würzburger Kickers	2016–17	2. Bundesliga	5	0	0	0	—		—		5	0
AEL	2017–18	Superleague Greece	19	0	6	0	—		—		25	0
Ermis Aradippou	2018–19	Cypriot First Division	14	0	2	0	—		—		16	0
Apollon Smyrnis	2019–20	Superleague Greece 2	9	0	1	0	—		—		10	0
Apollon Smyrnis	2020–21	Superleague Greece	14	0	2	1	—		—		16	1
Apollon Smyrnis	Total		23	0	3	1	—		—		26	1
Anagennisi Karditsa	2021–22	Super League Greece 2	7	0	2	0	—		—		9	0
Career total			155	5	33	1	13	0	0	0	201	6

(* includes Europa League, Champions League)
(** Super League Greece Play-offs)

== Honours ==
Panathinaikos

- Greek Cup: 2014
