= Konstantinos Triantafyllopoulos =

Greek footballer

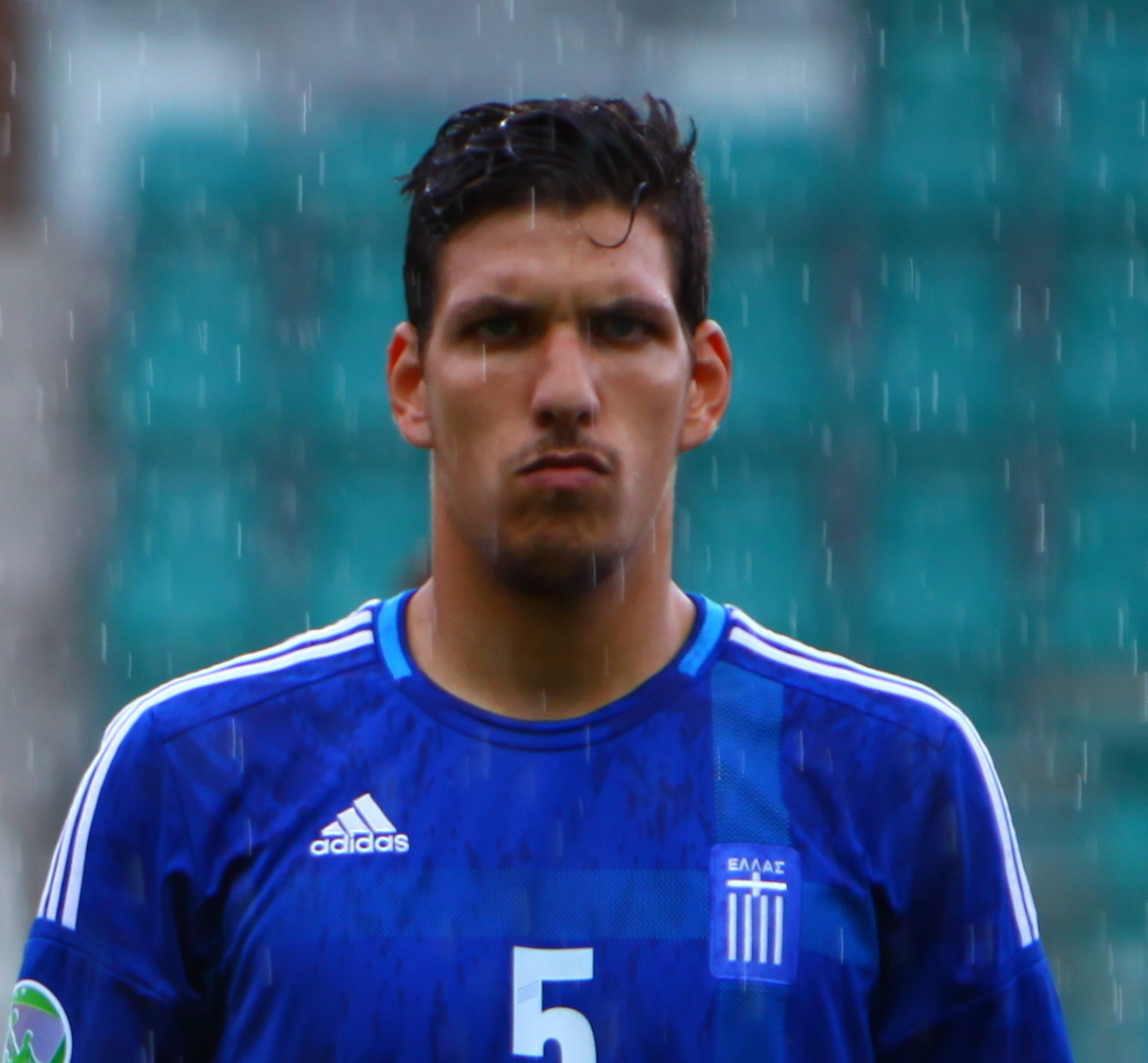
- Triantafyllopoulos with Greece U19 in 2012

Personal information
- Full name: Konstantinos Triantafyllopoulos
- Date of birth: 3 April 1993 (age 33)
- Place of birth: Corinth, Greece
- Height: 1.86 m (6 ft 1 in)
- Position: Centre-back

Youth career
- 2007–2012: Panathinaikos

Senior career*
Years	Team	Apps	(Gls)
2012–2016	Panathinaikos	73	(2)
2016–2019	Asteras Tripolis	60	(0)
2019–2023	Pogoń Szczecin	102	(5)
2023–2024	Górnik Zabrze	10	(0)
2024–2026	Asteras Tripolis	52	(1)

International career
2012	Greece U19	5	(0)
2013	Greece U20	7	(1)
2012–2014	Greece U21	8	(0)
Medal record
Men's football
Representing Greece
UEFA Euro U-19
Runner-up	2012 Estonia
- * Club domestic league appearances and goals as of 14 June 2026

Konstantinos "Kostas" Triantafyllopoulos (Greek: Κωνσταντίνος "Κώστας" Τριανταφυλλόπουλος; born 3 April 1993) is a Greek professional footballer who plays as a centre-back.

== Career ==
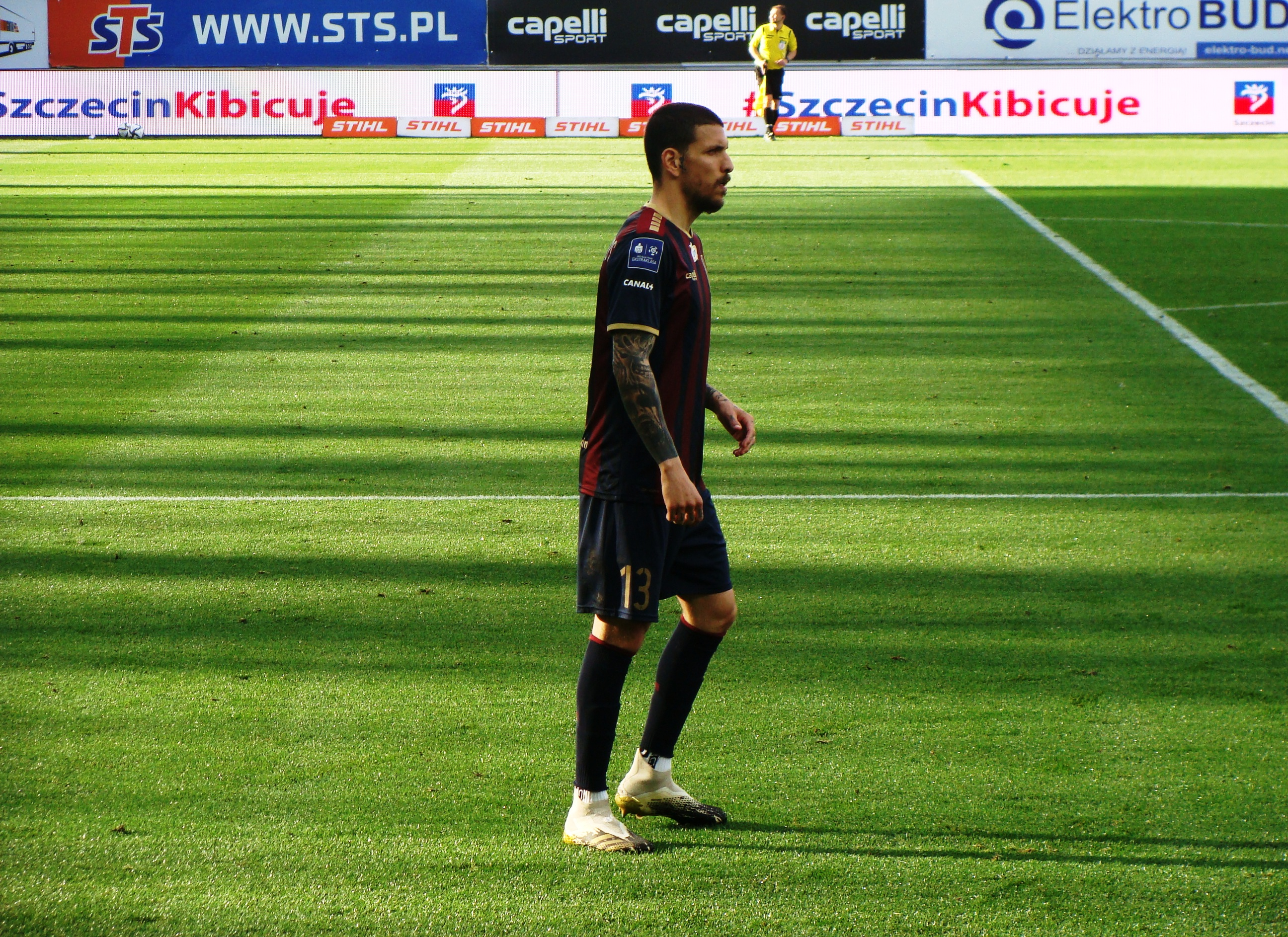
Triantafyllopoulos in 2021

On 30 September 2012, during a Super League match vs. Asteras Tripolis, Triantafyllopoulos made his debut for Panathinaikos. In his first season, he became a mainstay in the centre of defence. At the end of the season, Triantafyllopoulos signed a contract extension for three years. On 22 January 2016, Triantafyllopoulos signed a 3.5-year contract with Asteras Tripolis, despite the rumours that he will sign to Panionios, as part of Olivier Boumale transfer to Panathinaikos. His former club will keep a percentage of the profit from his next transfer.

On 13 June 2019, he joined Pogoń Szczecin on a two-year deal. On 10 August 2019, he scored his first goal with the club in a 1–0 home win game against Wisła Kraków contributing the most to his team's win. On 20 May 2021, Pogoń announced the renewal of the 28-year-old Greek defender's contract for one year with the possibility of extending their cooperation for another season.

On 19 July 2023, Triantafyllopoulos moved on a free transfer to another Ekstraklasa club Górnik Zabrze, with whom he signed a two-year contract. On 26 June 2024, he terminated his contract by mutual consent.

== Career statistics ==
As of 5 June 2024.

Club	Season	League			Cup		Europe		Other*		Total	
Club	Season	Division	Apps	Goals	Apps	Goals	Apps	Goals	Apps	Goals	Apps	Goals
Panathinaikos	2012–13	Super League Greece	15	0	3	0	2	0	1	0	21	0
Panathinaikos	2013–14	Super League Greece	26	1	8	0	—		5	0	39	1
Panathinaikos	2014–15	Super League Greece	18	1	5	0	9	0	4	0	36	1
Panathinaikos	2015–16	Super League Greece	4	0	2	0	2	0	—		8	0
Panathinaikos	Total		63	2	18	0	13	0	10	0	104	2
Asteras Tripolis	2015–16	Super League Greece	1	0	1	0	—		—		2	0
Asteras Tripolis	2016–17	Super League Greece	5	0	—		—		—		5	0
Asteras Tripolis	2017–18	Super League Greece	29	0	4	1	—		—		33	1
Asteras Tripolis	2018–19	Super League Greece	25	0	8	0	2	0	—		35	0
Asteras Tripolis	Total		60	0	13	1	2	0	0	0	75	1
Pogoń Szczecin	2019–20	Ekstraklasa	32	1	1	0	—		—		33	1
Pogoń Szczecin	2020–21	Ekstraklasa	17	1	2	0	—		—		19	1
Pogoń Szczecin	2021–22	Ekstraklasa	30	3	1	0	2	0	—		33	3
Pogoń Szczecin	2022–23	Ekstraklasa	23	0	1	0	2	0	—		26	0
Pogoń Szczecin	Total		102	5	5	0	4	0	—		111	5
Górnik Zabrze	2023–24	Ekstraklasa	10	0	2	0	—		—		12	0
Career total			235	7	38	1	19	0	10	0	302	8

(* includes Greek Playoffs)

== Honours ==
Panathinaikos

- Greek Cup: 2013–14

Greece U19

- UEFA European Under-19 Championship runner-up: 2012
