= Giannis Stamatakis =

Greek footballer

Personal information
- Full name: Ioannis Stamatakis
- Date of birth: 26 June 1994 (age 32)
- Place of birth: Larymna, Greece
- Height: 1.79 m (5 ft 10 1/2 in)
- Position: Midfielder

Team information
- Current team: Malesina
- Number: 8

Youth career
- Panathinaikos

Senior career*
| Years | Team | Apps | (Gls) |
| 2012–2016 | Panathinaikos | 3 | (1) |
| 2016–2017 | Panelefsiniakos | 36 | (3) |
| 2017–2018 | Anagennisi Karditsa | 30 | (1) |
| 2018–2019 | Aittitos Spata | 21 | (1) |
| 2019–2023 | Egaleo | 65 | (1) |
| 2023- | Malesina | 0 | (0) |
- * Club domestic league appearances and goals as of 16 June 2023

Giannis Stamatakis (Greek: Γιάννης Σταματάκης; born 26 June 1994) is a Greek professional footballer who plays for Malesina, a team that represents village Malesina . He plays as a central midfielder and comes from the Panathinaikos' youth ranks.

== Career ==
On 19 October 2012, Stamatakis along with three other players, signed his first professional contract with Panathinaikos. Accidentally broke his nose in the champion cup.

== Club statistics ==
As of 30 March 2019

| Club | Season | League | | | Cup | | Other | | Total | |
| Club | Season | Division | Apps | Goals | Apps | Goals | Apps | Goals | Apps | Goals |
|---|---|---|---|---|---|---|---|---|---|---|
| Panelefsiniakos | 2015–16 | Football League | 11 | 0 | 0 | 0 | — | | 11 | 0 |
| Panelefsiniakos | 2016–17 | Football League | 25 | 3 | 2 | 0 | — | | 27 | 3 |
| Panelefsiniakos | Total | | 36 | 3 | 2 | 0 | — | | 38 | 3 |
| Anagennisi Karditsa | 2017–18 | Football League | 30 | 1 | 3 | 0 | — | | 33 | 1 |
| Aittitos Spata | 2018–19 | Football League | 21 | 1 | 3 | 0 | — | | 24 | 1 |
| Career total | | | 87 | 5 | 8 | 0 | 0 | 0 | 95 | 5 |

(*includes Europa League, Champions League)
(**Super League Greece Play-offs)

== Honours ==
Panathinaikos

- Greek Cup: 2014
