= Athanasios Dinas =

Greek professional footballer

Thanasis Dinas
Personal information
- Full name: Athanasios Dinas
- Date of birth: 12 November 1989 (age 36)
- Place of birth: Komotini, Greece
- Height: 1.70 m (5 ft 7 in)
- Position: Winger

Senior career*
Years	Team	Apps	(Gls)
2007–2010	Skoda Xanthi	1	(0)
2008–2010	→ Zakynthos (loan)	51	(2)
2010–2013	Panachaiki	69	(9)
2013–2015	Panathinaikos	34	(2)
2015–2017	Platanias	34	(0)
2017–2018	Trikala	8	(0)
2018–2020	OFI	35	(10)
2020–2021	Xanthi	16	(1)
2021–2022	Veria	3	(0)
2022	Pierikos	12	(1)
2022–2023	Panthrakikos		
- * Club domestic league appearances and goals as of 27 April 2022

Athanasios "Thanasis" Dinas (Greek: Αθανάσιος "Θανάσης" Ντίνας; born 12 November 1989) is a Greek former professional footballer who played as a winger.

== Career ==
Dinas began his professional career at Xanthi. He was then loaned at Zakynthos In 2010, Dinas signed with Panachaiki. He stayed there for three years. On 31 January 2013, he signed with Panathinaikos in a 3 1/2-year deal. He made his debut in a match against Aris, in which Panathinaikos lost 1–0. On 2 January 2014, he renew his contract with Panathinaikos till the summer of 2017.

With the purchase of Nikos Kaltsas from Veria, Dinas could not find a place in the Panathinaikos roster, but undoubtedly could be an excellent solution for the other Super League clubs. The 25-year-old received several proposals but Platanias seems to be his next club. Dinas is expected to travel to Crete in order to negotiate the final details and sign his new contract, as a free transfer and not as a loan.

On 7 September 2017 Football League side Trikala announced the signing of Dinas.

On 22 January 2018, following his release from Trikala, he joined OFI on a 6-month contract, with an option for an additional year. On 25 February 2018 he scored his first goal for the club in a 2–0 home win against Panserraikos. On 17 March 2018 he scored two goals, both with free-kicks, in a 3–1 away win against Kallithea. One week later he scored one goal and gave one assist in an impressive 4–2 home win against Ergotelis, despite his team being down by two goals in the first five minutes. On 21 April 2018 he opened the score in an eventual 1–1 away draw against Kissamikos. Five days later he scored a brace in an emphatic 7–0 home win against Panegialios. On 29 April 2018 he scored with a penalty in a 1–0 away win against Apollon Pontus, which sealed the team's return to the Super League after 4 years of absence. On 13 May 2018 he scored two goals in a 2–1 away win against Karaiskakis. On 28 May 2018, the team's administration officially announced the renewal of his contract for an additional season.

On 5 October 2020, Papazoglou signed a contract with Greek club Xanthi F.C. for an undisclosed fee.

== Career statistics ==
As of 19 May 2021

Club	Season	League		Cup		Europe*		Other**		Total	
Club	Season	Apps	Goals	Apps	Goals	Apps	Goals	Apps	Goals	Apps	Goals
Xanthi	2007–08	1	0	0	0	0	0	0	0	1	0
Zakynthos	2008–09	23	1	1	0	0	0	0	0	24	1
Zakynthos	2009–10	28	1	1	0	0	0	0	0	29	1
Panachaiki	2010–11	24	1	3	1	0	0	0	0	27	2
Panachaiki	2011–12	29	7	2	1	0	0	5	1	36	9
Panachaiki	2012–13	16	1	3	0	0	0	0	0	19	1
Panathinaikos	2013	5	0	0	0	0	0	0	0	5	0
Panathinaikos	2013–14	16	1	4	0	0	0	0	0	20	1
Panathinaikos	2014–15	14	1	1	0	6	1	0	0	21	2
Platanias	2015–16	16	0	3	1	0	0	0	0	19	1
Platanias	2016–17	11	0	4	1	0	0	0	0	15	1
Trikala	2017–18	8	0	3	0	0	0	0	0	11	0
OFI	2017–18	17	10	4	1	0	0	0	0	21	11
OFI	2018–19	17	0	2	0	0	0	0	0	19	0
OFI	2019–20	1	0	1	0	0	0	0	0	2	0
Xanthi F.C.	2020-21	16	1	0	0	0	0	0	0	16	1
Career totals		245	24	30	5	6	1	5	1	288	31

(* includes Europa League, Champions League)
(**Super League Greece Play-offs and Football League Play-offs)

== Honours ==
Panathinaikos

- Greek Cup: 2014
