= Nano (footballer, born 1984) =

Spanish footballer

Personal information
- Full name: Mariano González Maroto
- Date of birth: 27 October 1984 (age 42)
- Place of birth: Málaga, Spain
- Height: 1.82 m (6 ft 0 in)
- Position: Left-back

Team information
- Current team: Lincoln Red Imps
- Number: 21

Senior career*
Years	Team	Apps	(Gls)
2003–2004	Fuengirola	12	(1)
2004–2006	Marbella	51	(4)
2006–2007	Gimnàstic	5	(0)
2006–2007	→ Barcelona B (loan)	7	(0)
2007	→ Córdoba (loan)	15	(0)
2007–2008	Lleida	35	(1)
2008–2009	Cartagena	36	(4)
2009–2010	Cádiz	25	(3)
2010–2012	Oviedo	66	(6)
2012–2013	Ponferradina	41	(2)
2013–2016	Panathinaikos	87	(3)
2016–2019	Almería	73	(0)
2019–2020	Recreativo	25	(1)
2020–2022	St Joseph's	31	(12)
2022–	Lincoln Red Imps	97	(18)
- * Club domestic league appearances and goals as of 08:52, 22 November 2026 (UTC)

Mariano González Maroto (born 27 October 1984), commonly known as Nano, is a Spanish professional footballer who plays as a left-back or midfielder for Gibraltar National League club Lincoln Red Imps.

== Club career ==
=== Spain ===
Born in Málaga, Andalusia, Nano spent the vast majority of his first six years as a senior in the lower leagues and amateur football, representing UD Fuengirola Los Boliches, UD Marbella, FC Barcelona Atlètic, Córdoba CF, UE Lleida and FC Cartagena. The exception to this occurred during the 2005–06 season, when he totalled only 198 minutes in the Segunda División for Gimnàstic de Tarragona to help them to promote to La Liga.

Nano returned to the second division in the 2009–10 campaign, being relatively played by Cádiz CF but suffering relegation. He scored his first goal as a professional on 4 October 2009, in a 1–0 away win against Albacete Balompié.

After two years back in division three, with Real Oviedo, Nano returned to the second tier by signing for SD Ponferradina. He only missed one game in 42 in his only season, adding two goals to help the club avoid relegation one year after promoting.

=== Panathinaikos ===
In the summer of 2013, after refusing to show up for training, Nano joined Panathinaikos F.C. from Greece. He made his debut in top-flight football on 18 August of that year, featuring the full 90 minutes in a 2–0 home victory over Panetolikos F.C. in the Super League and converting a three-minute penalty kick in the process.

Nano extended his contract to Pana on 8 December 2014, until 2017. During his spell in Athens, he was successively reconverted into a left-back.

=== Return to Spain ===
On 25 August 2016, Nano signed a two-year deal with Spanish second division team UD Almería. He totalled 72 appearances over his first two seasons, but all but missed 2018–19 due to an ankle injury.

Nano returned to Segunda División B in summer 2019, with the 34-year-old agreeing to a contract at Recreativo de Huelva.

== Honours ==
Panathinaikos

- Greek Football Cup: 2013–14

Individual

- Super League Greece Team of the Season: 2013–14
