= 2018–19 AEK Athens F.C. season =

AEK Athens
2018–19 season
- Chairman: Evangelos Aslanidis
- Manager: Marinos Ouzounidis (until 5 February); Manolo Jiménez
- Stadium: Athens Olympic Stadium
- Super League: 3rd
- Greek Cup: Runners-up
- UEFA Champions League: Group stage
- Top goalscorer: League: Ezequiel Ponce (16); All: Ezequiel Ponce (21)
- Highest home attendance: 56,865 (vs Bayern Munich) (23 October 2018)
- Lowest home attendance: 1,594 (vs Apollon Smyrnis) (23 February 2019)
- Average home league attendance: 9,621
- Biggest win: AEK Athens 5–0 AO Chania−Kissamikos
- Biggest defeat: Olympiacos 4–1 AEK Athens; Ajax 3–0 AEK Athens
Home colours	Away colours	Third colours

The 2018–19 season was the 95th season in the existence of AEK Athens F.C. and the 58th competitive season and fourth consecutive in the top flight of Greek football. They competed in the Super League, the Greek Cup and the Champions League. The season began on 8 August 2018 and finished on 11 May 2019.

== Kits ==
Supplier: Capelli
Sponsor(s): Pame stoixima
Features: LG Corp

Home	Away	Third

== Overview ==
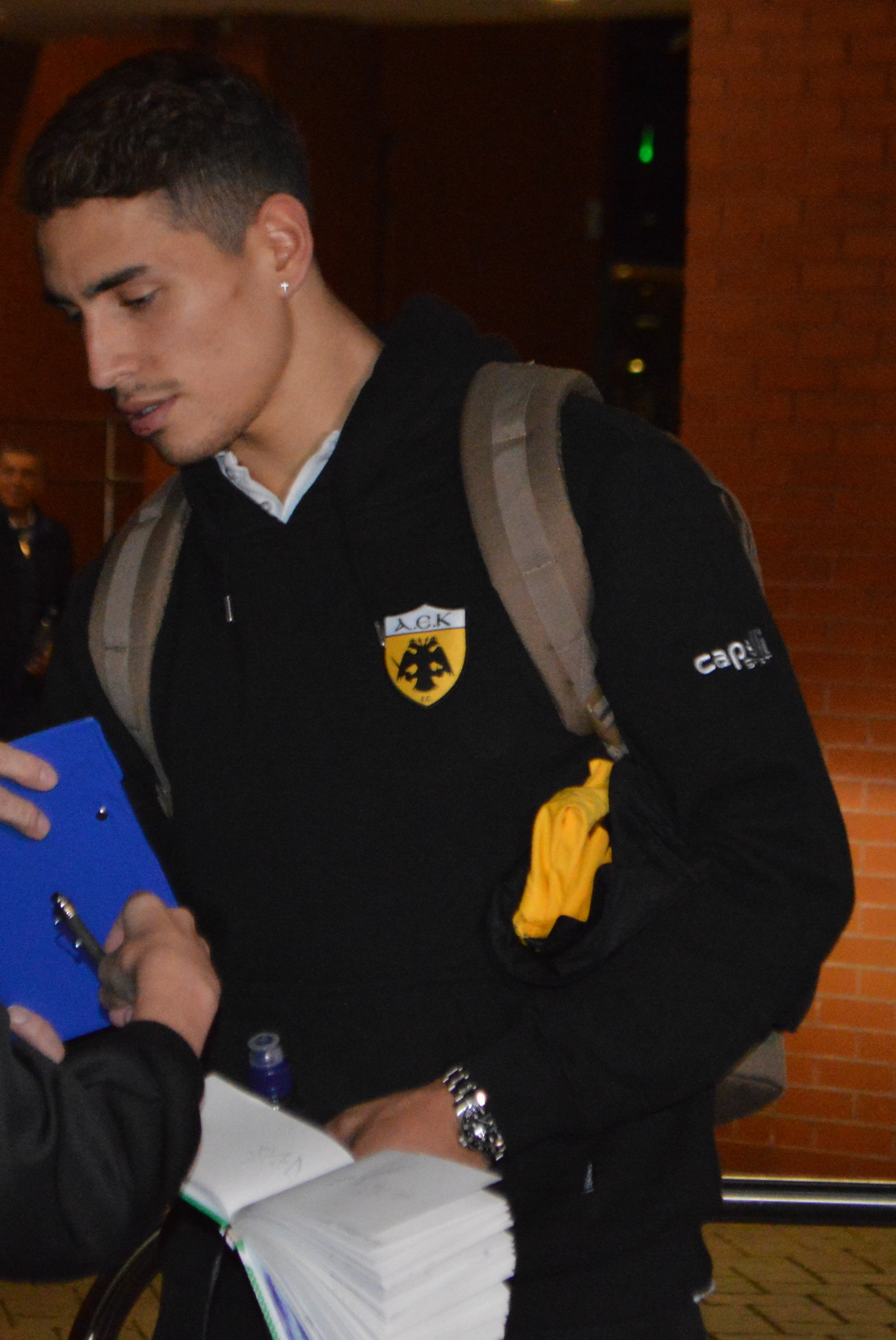
Ezequiel Ponce

AEK having won the championship after 24 years, aimed to enter the group stage of the Champions League. However, last season's championship-winning team had begun to fall apart well before the start of the summer. Initially the contract of Manolo Jiménez, was expired and despite his highly successful second spell at the team's bench, he decided not to renew it and return to Spain to sign for Las Palmas, in order to be close to his family. The Sevillian manager was immediately replaced with Marinos Ouzounidis, who despite his very good job at the bench of then problematic Panathinaikos and at the league's smaller clubs, had no experience in playing with the pressure of claiming the league. Afterwards, one of the most valuable players of the previous season, Lazaros Christodoulopoulos, who did not agree with the management about his contract, did the unthinkable and signed for Olympiacos, with the assumption of his contract going in the courts, without affecting anything in the end. Important players such as Giannis Anestis and Jakob Johansson left after the expiration of their contracts, Ognjen Vranješ was transferred to Anderlecht, while Panagiotis Kone and Sergio Araujo returned to their clubs after their loan spells ended, with the latter reuniting with his former manager. Araujo was replaced with the loan of another great Argentine striker, Ezequiel Ponce from Roma. In addition, AEK proceeded with the loans of Marios Oikonomou, Alef and Lucas Boyé, while activating the purchase option of Marko Livaja and acquired Stratos Svarnas, Christos Albanis and Giannis Gianniotas.

The competitive obligations started with the Champions League qualifiers, where AEK were drawn against the Scottish champions, Celtic. In the first leg at Celtic Park the yellow-blacks found themselves behind early on, but managed to level the game and equalize before the half-time. In the second half, while AEK were starting to get the game under control, they were left with 10 players, due to the unjustified dismissal of Galanopoulos, but managed to keep the final 1–1. In the rematch at the Olympic Stadium, AEK managed to dominate the game from the start and quickly took the lead with 2 goals at the beginning of each half. However, after the second goal the yellow-blacks played to keep the score with the Scots pressing, but all they managed was to go down in the final 2–1. AEK were a breath away from the group stage with their only obstacle being the Hungarian champions, MOL Vidi. In the match of the Groupama Arena, AEK pressed their opponent, managing to take an easy lead with 2 goals, but an unfortunate tackle by Bakasetas resulted in his dismissal with a straight red card and from there on the roles were reversed with Vidi constantly pressing and scoring the goal that put them back in the qualification game. With AEK having a favorable 2–1 score from the first leg, they went into the second leg playing conservatively and at a low tempo, keeping control of the game. At the start of the second half, AEK won a penalty and made it 1–0, with the Hungarians then gaining ground on the pitch and equalizing in a moment of inactivity of the yellow-black defense. AEK continued to try to freeze the game's tempo and keep the ball in their possession and especially after being left with 10 players from the 80th minute, they delayed just waiting for the match to end. The final whistle found AEK in the Champions League group stage and Livaja receiving an unacceptable red card for attacking an opponent player, as well as a 4 match ban. After that match, AEK completed a 14-game unbeatean streak in the UEFA competitions, breaking their previous record for the longest ubeatean run in Europe for a Greek team. They were placed in Group E along with Bayern Munich, Benfica and Ajax and having a very difficult task, AEK performed tragically, losing all six matches and thus ending their European campaign.

In the league AEK started well with emphatic wins, but an away defeat to PAOK, as well as a 3-point deduction after a home draw with Olympiacos, left them behind in the title race, which brought disappointment within the team and negatively affected their performance. Ouzounidis, unable to change the team's playing situation and restore them to the title race, resigned in February and was replaced by Jiménez, who had been released from his club since November. The return of the Spaniard to the bench of the team after 9 months failed to change anything, AEK continued their ups and downs in their performance and in the end they barely managed to finish in third place of the standings.

In the cup, AEK easily finished at top of their group with only wins and prevailed AO Chania−Kissamikos for the round of 16. Afterwards, they eliminated with relative ease Atromitos and Lamia for the quarter-finals and the semi-finals, respectively. In the final AEK faced PAOK for a third year in a row and in a repeat of the last season's final. On 11 May, in a very tight match and after a questionable refereeing, AEK once again lost the title with 1–0 to the black and whites, who won the domestic double.

== Management team ==
Position	Staff
Manager	(Spain) Manolo Jiménez
Assistant manager	(Spain) Felipe Benitez Ufano
Assistant manager	(Greece) Nikos Panagiotaras
Goalkeeping coach	(Greece) Chrysostomos Michailidis
Fitness coach	(Spain) Sebastián López Bascón
Academy director	(Greece) Ilias Kyriakidis
Academy manager	(Greece) Nikos Kostenoglou
U19 Manager	(Greece) Giorgos Simos
U17 Manager	(Serbia) Ivan Nedeljković
Technical director	(Greece) Nikos Liberopoulos
Sporting director	(Serbia) Vladimir Matijašević
Head of Scouting	(Greece) Michalis Kasapis
Scout	(Greece) Dimitrios Barbalias
Scout	(Greece) Andreas Lagonikakis
Scout	(Greece) Christos Maladenis
Head of Medical	(Greece) Lakis Nikolaou

- Source: aekfc.gr

== Players ==
=== Squad information ===
NOTE: The players are the ones that have been announced by the AEK Athens' press release. No edits should be made unless a player arrival or exit is announced. Updated 11 May 2019, 23:59 UTC+3.

No.	Player	Nat.	Position(s)	Date of birth (Age)	Signed	Previous club	Transfer fee	Contract until
Goalkeepers
1	Vasilis Barkas	(Greece) (Netherlands)	GK	30 May 1994 (aged 25)	2016	(Greece) Atromitos	€600,000	2022
16	Panagiotis Tsintotas	(Greece)	GK	4 July 1993 (aged 25)	2017	(Greece) Levadiakos	Free	2023
40	Makis Giannikoglou	(Greece)	GK	25 March 1993 (aged 26)	2018	(Greece) PAS Giannina	Free	2021
99	Panagiotis Ginis	(Greece)	GK	23 January 1999 (aged 20)	2018	(Greece) AEK Athens U19	—	2021
Defenders
2	Michalis Bakakis (Vice-captain 2)	(Greece)	RB / LB / CB / RM	18 March 1991 (aged 28)	2014	(Greece) Panetolikos	€250,000	2023
3	Hélder Lopes	(Portugal)	LB / LM / LW	4 January 1989 (aged 30)	2017	(Spain) Las Palmas	Free	2022
4	Marios Oikonomou	(Greece)	CB / LB	6 October 1992 (aged 26)	2019	(Italy) Bologna	€700,000	2022
5	Vasilios Lampropoulos	(Greece)	CB / RB	31 March 1990 (aged 29)	2016	(Greece) Panionios	Free	2019
12	Rodrigo Galo	(Brazil)	RB / RM / RW / LB	19 September 1986 (aged 32)	2015	(Portugal) Paços de Ferreira	Free	2019
15	Uroš Ćosić	(Serbia)	CB / RB / LB / DM	24 October 1992 (aged 26)	2017	(Italy) Empoli	€500,000	2020
19	Dmytro Chyhrynskyi	(Ukraine)	CB	7 November 1986 (aged 32)	2016	(Ukraine) Dnipro Dnipropetrovsk	Free	2020
23	Niklas Hult	(Sweden)	LB / LM	13 February 1990 (aged 29)	2018	(Greece) Panathinaikos	€200,000	2020
24	Stratos Svarnas	(Greece)	CB / RB	11 November 1997 (aged 21)	2018	(Greece) Xanthi	Free	2023
31	Konstantinos Stamoulis	(Greece)	CB / RB	29 October 2000 (aged 18)	2018	(Greece) AEK Athens U19	—	2021
33	Georgios Giannoutsos	(Greece)	LB / CB / DM	16 July 1998 (aged 20)	2016	(Greece) AEK Athens U20	—	2020
50	Michalis Bousis	(Greece)	CB / LB	2 January 1999 (aged 20)	2018	(Greece) AEK Athens U19	—	2021
—	Giannis Tsivelekidis	(Greece)	CB / RB	4 June 1999 (aged 20)	2018	(Greece) AEK Athens U19	—	2021
Midfielders
6	Nenad Krstičić	(Serbia)	CM / DM / AM	3 July 1990 (aged 28)	2019	(Serbia) Red Star	€500,000	2022
8	André Simões (Vice-captain)	(Portugal)	DM / CM	16 December 1989 (aged 29)	2015	(Portugal) Moreirense	Free	2022
20	Petros Mantalos (Captain)	(Greece)	AM / LM / CM / LW / SS / RM / RW	31 August 1991 (aged 27)	2014	(Greece) Xanthi	€500,000	2022
25	Konstantinos Galanopoulos	(Greece)	CM / DM	28 December 1997 (aged 21)	2015	(Greece) AEK Athens U20	—	2021
51	Giannis Sardelis	(Greece)	AM / CM / RW / LW	3 November 2000 (aged 18)	2018	(Greece) AEK Athens U19	—	2021
70	Giannis Fivos Botos	(Greece)	AM / CM / LM / RM	20 December 2000 (aged 18)	2018	(Greece) AEK Athens U19	—	2021
95	Alef	(Brazil)	CM / DM	28 January 1995 (aged 24)	2018	(Portugal) Braga	€150,000	2019
Forwards
7	Christos Albanis	(Greece)	LW / RW / LM / RM / SS	4 November 1994 (aged 24)	2018	(Greece) Apollon Smyrnis	€400,000	2021
10	Marko Livaja	(Croatia)	SS / ST / AM / LW / RW / LM / RM	26 August 1993 (aged 25)	2018	(Spain) Las Palmas	€1,800,000	2021
11	Giannis Gianniotas	(Greece)	RW / LW / RM / LM / SS / ST	29 April 1993 (aged 26)	2018	(Greece) Olympiacos	Free	2021
14	Anastasios Bakasetas	(Greece)	SS / AM / ST / RW / LW / RM / LM	28 June 1993 (aged 26)	2016	(Greece) Panionios	€300,000	2022
17	Victor Klonaridis	(Belgium) (Greece)	SS / LW / RW / LM / RM / ST / AM / CM	28 July 1992 (aged 26)	2017	(France) Lens	€200,000	2020
22	Ezequiel Ponce	(Argentina) (Spain)	ST	29 March 1997 (aged 22)	2018	(Italy) Roma	Free	2019
31	Lucas Boyé	(Argentina) (Italy)	SS / ST / LW / RW / LM / RM / AM	28 February 1996 (aged 23)	2018	(Italy) Torino	€450,000	2019
77	Christos Giousis	(Greece) (Albania)	RW / LW / RM / LM / SS / AM	8 October 1999 (aged 19)	2017	(Greece) AEK Athens U20	—	2022
Left during Winter Transfer Window
32	Paris Babis	(Greece)	DM / CM	17 July 1999 (aged 19)	2017	(Greece) AEK Athens U20	—	2022
39	Erik Morán	(Spain)	DM / CM	25 May 1991 (aged 28)	2018	(Spain) Leganés	€130,000	2021
—	Astrit Ajdarević	(Albania) (Sweden)	CM / AM / DM / ST	17 April 1990 (aged 29)	2016	(Sweden) Örebro	Free	2019
9	Giorgos Giakoumakis	(Greece)	ST / SS	9 December 1994 (aged 24)	2017	(Greece) Platanias	€300,000	2021

== Transfers ==
=== In ===
==== Summer ====
No.	Pos.	Player	From	Fee	Date	Contract Until	Source
7	FW	(Greece) Christos Albanis	(Greece) Apollon Smyrnis	€400,000	26 June 2018	30 June 2021	
10	FW	(Croatia) Marko Livaja	(Spain) Las Palmas	€1,800,000	1 July 2018	30 June 2021	
11	FW	(Greece) Giannis Gianniotas	(Greece) Olympiacos	Free transfer	29 August 2018	30 June 2021	
24	DF	(Greece) Stratos Svarnas	(Greece) Xanthi	Free transfer	16 August 2018	30 June 2023	
31	DF	(Greece) Konstantinos Stamoulis	(Greece) AEK Athens U19	Promotion	1 July 2018	30 June 2021	
40	GK	(Greece) Makis Giannikoglou	(Greece) PAS Giannina	Free transfer	1 July 2018	30 June 2021	
50	DF	(Greece) Michalis Bousis	(Greece) AEK Athens U19	Promotion	1 July 2018	30 June 2021	
51	MF	(Greece) Giannis Sardelis	(Greece) AEK Athens U19	Promotion	2 July 2018	30 June 2021	
70	MF	(Greece) Giannis Fivos Botos	(Greece) AEK Athens U19	Promotion	1 July 2018	30 June 2021	
99	GK	(Greece) Panagiotis Ginis	(Greece) AEK Athens U19	Promotion	1 July 2018	30 June 2021	
—	GK	(Greece) Giannis Papadopoulos	(Greece) AO Chania−Kissamikos	Loan return	1 July 2018	30 June 2020	
—	GK	(Greece) Vasilios Chatziemmanouil	(Greece) AEK Athens U19	Promotion	1 July 2018	30 June 2021	
—	DF	(Greece) Alkis Markopouliotis	(Greece) AO Chania−Kissamikos	Loan return	1 July 2018	30 June 2019	
—	DF	(Greece) Giannis Tsivelekidis	(Greece) AEK Athens U19	Promotion	1 July 2018	30 June 2021	
—	DF	(Greece) Stavros Vasilantonopoulos	(Greece) Lamia	Loan return	1 July 2018	30 June 2020	
—	MF	(Greece) Konstantinos Malai	(Greece) Paniliakos	Free transfer	31 July 2018	30 June 2021	
—	MF	(Brazil) Pedro Vitor	(Brazil) Sport Recife U20	Free transfer	11 August 2018	30 June 2023	
—	FW	(Greece) Andreas Vlachomitros	(Greece) Apollon Pontus	Loan return	1 July 2018	30 June 2019	

==== Winter ====
No.	Pos.	Player	From	Fee	Date	Contract Until	Source
4	DF	(Greece) Marios Oikonomou	(Italy) Bologna	€700,000	22 January 2019	30 June 2022	
6	MF	(Serbia) Nenad Krstičić	(Serbia) Red Star	€500,000	4 January 2019	30 June 2022	
—	MF	(Greece) Konstantinos Malai	(Greece) Trikala	Loan termination	31 December 2018	30 June 2021	
—	MF	(Bosnia and Herzegovina) Anel Šabanadžović	(Bosnia and Herzegovina) Željezničar	€450,000	11 January 2019	31 December 2023	
—	FW	(Greece) Christos Antoniou	(Greece) Ergotelis	Loan termination	7 January 2019	30 June 2022	
—	FW	(Greece) Andreas Vlachomitros	(Greece) Sparta	Loan return	31 December 2018	30 June 2021	

=== Out ===
==== Summer ====
No.	Pos.	Player	To	Fee	Date	Source
4	DF	(Bosnia and Herzegovina) Ognjen Vranješ	(Belgium) Anderlecht	€3,200,000	20 June 2018	
7	FW	(Greece) Lazaros Christodoulopoulos	(Greece) Olympiacos	End of contract	1 July 2018	
10	FW	(Croatia) Marko Livaja	(Spain) Las Palmas	Loan return	30 June 2018	
11	FW	(Argentina) Sergio Araujo	(Spain) Las Palmas	Loan return	30 June 2018	
16	GK	(Greece) Panagiotis Dounis	(Greece) Panegialios	Contract termination	20 August 2018	
18	MF	(Sweden) Jakob Johansson	(France) Stade Rennais	End of contract	1 July 2018	
21	MF	(Greece) Panagiotis Kone	(Italy) Udinese	Loan return	30 June 2018	
22	GK	(Greece) Giannis Anestis	(Israel) Hapoel Be'er Sheva	End of contract	5 July 2018	
24	MF	(Iran) Masoud Shojaei	(Iran) Tractor Sazi	End of contract	2 August 2018	
31	FW	(Greece) Dimitrios Melikiotis	(Greece) Volos	Contract termination	11 July 2018	
55	DF	(Greece) Adam Tzanetopoulos	(Greece) Apollon Smyrnis	Contract termination	8 July 2018	
—	MF	(Brazil) Pedro Vitor	(Greece) Aris	Free transfer^{[a]}	31 August 2018	

==== Winter ====
No.	Pos.	Player	To	Fee	Date	Source
4	DF	(Greece) Marios Oikonomou	(Italy) Bologna	Loan termination^{[b]}	22 January 2019	
6	MF	(Albania) Astrit Ajdarević	(Sweden) Djurgården	Contract termination	30 November 2018	

=== Loan in ===
==== Summer ====
No.	Pos.	Player	From	Fee	Date	Until	Option to buy	Source
4	DF	(Greece) Marios Oikonomou	(Italy) Bologna	€100,000	28 June 2018	30 June 2019	✓	
22	FW	(Argentina) Ezequiel Ponce	(Italy) Roma	Free	19 July 2018	30 June 2019	✓	
31	FW	(Argentina) Lucas Boyé	(Italy) Torino	€450,000	18 July 2018	30 June 2019	✓	
95	MF	(Brazil) Alef	(Portugal) Braga	€150,000	20 July 2018	30 June 2019	✓	

=== Loan out ===
==== Summer ====
No.	Pos.	Player	To	Fee	Date	Until	Option to buy	Source
—	GK	(Greece) Thanasis Pantos	(Greece) Sparta	Free	14 July 2018	30 June 2019	✗	
—	DF	(Greece) Stavros Vasilantonopoulos	(Greece) Lamia	Free	4 July 2018	30 June 2019	✗	
—	MF	(Greece) Konstantinos Malai	(Greece) Trikala	Free	4 September 2018	30 June 2019	✗	
—	MF	(Greece) Ilias Tselios	(Greece) Ergotelis	Free	19 July 2018	30 June 2019	✗	
—	FW	(Greece) Christos Antoniou	(Greece) Ergotelis	Free	25 July 2018	30 June 2019	✗	
—	FW	(Greece) Andreas Vlachomitros	(Greece) Sparta	Free	2 August 2018	30 June 2019	✗	

==== Winter ====
No.	Pos.	Player	To	Fee	Date	Until	Option to buy	Source
9	FW	(Greece) Giorgos Giakoumakis	(Greece) OFI	Undislosed	24 January 2019	30 June 2019	✓	
32	MF	(Greece) Paris Babis	(Greece) Apollon Pontus	Free	28 January 2019	30 June 2019	✗	
39	MF	(Spain) Erik Morán	(Spain) Málaga	Undisclosed	29 January 2019	30 June 2019	✓	
—	MF	(Greece) Konstantinos Malai	(Greece) Paniliakos	Free	29 January 2019	30 June 2019	✗	
—	MF	(Bosnia and Herzegovina) Anel Šabanadžović	(Bosnia and Herzegovina) Željezničar	Free	11 January 2019	30 June 2019	✗	
—	FW	(Greece) Christos Antoniou	(Greece) Diagoras	Free	1 February 2019	30 June 2019	✗	
—	FW	(Greece) Andreas Vlachomitros	(Greece) Aiginiakos	Free	1 February 2019	30 June 2019	✗	

=== Contract renewals ===
No.	Pos.	Player	Date	Former Exp. Date	New Exp. Date	Source
1	GK	(Greece) Vasilis Barkas	7 June 2018	30 June 2019	30 June 2022	
2	DF	(Greece) Michalis Bakakis	29 August 2018	30 June 2020	30 June 2023	
3	DF	(Portugal) Hélder Lopes	8 January 2019	30 June 2019	30 June 2022	
8	MF	(Portugal) André Simões	8 January 2019	30 June 2019	30 June 2022	
14	FW	(Greece) Anastasios Bakasetas	10 January 2019	30 June 2019	30 June 2022	
16	GK	(Greece) Panagiotis Tsintotas	29 August 2018	30 June 2020	30 June 2023	

Notes

a. Co-ownership.

b. AEK Athens enabled the player's buy-out clause prematurely.

=== Overall transfer activity ===
==== Expenditure ====
Summer: ▼€2,900,000

Winter: ▼€1,650,000

Total: ▼€4,550,000

==== Income ====
Summer: ▲€3,200,000

Winter: ▲€0

Total: ▲€3,200,000

==== Net Totals ====
Summer: ▲€300,000

Winter: ▼€1,650,000

Total: ▼€1,350,000

== Pre-season and friendlies ==
7 July 2018 Friendly	AEK Athens	0–1	Miedź Legnica	Częstochowa
20:00 EEST (UTC+3)		Report	Kunić 31'	Stadium: Stadion Piłkarski; Referee: Marcin Szrek (Poland)

13 July 2018 Friendly	AEK Athens	0–0	AEK Larnaca	Radom
17:00 EEST (UTC+3)		Report		Stadium: Radomiak Radom Stadion

21 July 2018 Friendly	Atromitos	0–0	AEK Athens	Peristeri
19:00 EEST (UTC+3)	Risvanis (yellow card) 28'; Bruno (yellow card) 67'	Report	Lampropoulos (yellow card) 19'	Stadium: Peristeri Stadium; Referee: Anastasios Sidiropoulos (Dodecanese)

31 July 2018 Friendly	AEK Athens	3–2	Galatasaray	Marousi
19:00 EEST (UTC+3)	Livaja 34'; Bakasetas 51'; Mantalos 56'	Report	Belhanda (yellow card) 26'; Maicon 22', 67', (yellow card) 40'; Aziz (yellow card) 55'	Stadium: Olympic Stadium; Referee: Athanasios Tzilos (Larissa)

7 September 2018 Friendly	Trikala	1–4	AEK Athens	Trikala
19:00 EEST (UTC+3)	Symelidis 15'	Report	Giakoumakis 2'; Lopes 9'; Galanopoulos 12'; Klonaridis 26'	Stadium: Trikala Municipal Stadium; Referee: Alexandros Aretopoulos (Trikala)

== Competitions ==
=== Overall record ===
Competition	First match	Last match	Starting round	Final position	Record							
Competition	First match	Last match	Starting round	Final position	Pld	W	D	L	GF	GA	GD	Win %
Super League	25 August 2018	5 May 2019	Matchday 1	3rd	30	18	6	6	50	19	+31	60.00
Greek Cup	12 October 2018	11 May 2019	Group Stage	Runners-up	10	8	1	1	25	4	+21	80.00
UEFA Champions League	8 August 2018	12 December 2018	Third qualifying round	Group Stage	10	2	2	6	8	17	−9	20.00
Total					50	28	9	13	83	40	+43	56.00

Last updated: 11 May 2019
Source: Competitions

=== Super League Greece ===
==== League table ====
Pos	Team	Pld	W	D	L	GF	GA	GD	Pts	Qualification or relegation
1	PAOK (Note: PAOK were deducted 2 points by court decision.) (C)	30	26	4	0	66	14	+52	80	Qualification for the Champions League third qualifying round
2	Olympiacos	30	24	3	3	71	17	+54	75	Qualification for the Champions League second qualifying round
3	AEK Athens (Note: AEK Athens were deducted 3 points by court decision.)	30	18	6	6	50	19	+31	57	Qualification for the Europa League third qualifying round
4	Atromitos	30	15	7	8	41	28	+13	52	Qualification for the Europa League second qualifying round
5	Aris	30	15	4	11	46	33	+13	49	Qualification for the Europa League second qualifying round

Source: Super League Greece
Rules for classification: 1) Points; 2) Head-to-head points; 3) Head-to-head goal difference; 4) Goal difference; 5) Goals scored; 6) Goals against 7) Play-offs (neutral ground); 8) Draw.
(Note: Criteria 7 is only used if needed to decide champion, teams for relegation or teams for UEFA competitions).
(C) Champions

==== Results summary ====
Overall								Home						Away					
Pld	W	D	L	GF	GA	GD	Pts	W	D	L	GF	GA	GD	W	D	L	GF	GA	GD
30	18	6	6	50	19	+31	57	10	3	2	27	6	+21	8	3	4	23	13	+10

Last updated: 2019-05-11.
Source: Super League Greece

==== Results by Matchday ====
Round	1	2	3	4	5	6	7	8	9	10	11	12	13	14	15	16	17	18	19	20	21	22	23	24	25	26	27	28	29	30
Ground	H	A	H	A	A	H	A	H	A	H	A	H	H	A	H	A	H	A	H	H	A	H	A	H	A	H	A	A	H	A
Result	W	W	W	L	W	D	W	W	D	L	L	W	W	D	W	W	W	W	D	W	L	W	L	D	W	W	W	D	L	W
Position	2	3	2	5	3	6	3	3	5	5	7	4	4	4	4	3	3	3	3	3	3	3	4	3	3	3	3	3	3	3

Updated to match(es) played on 11 May 2019. Source: slgr.gr
A = Away; H = Home; W = Win; D = Draw; L = Loss; P = Postponed

==== Matches ====
25 August 2018 1	AEK Athens	2–0	PAS Giannina	Marousi
20:30 EEST (UTC+3)	Ponce (yellow card) 24', (goal) 37'; Livaja 47'; Klonaridis (yellow card) 81'	Report	Lila (yellow card) 15'; Tzimopoulos (yellow card) 76'; Krizman (yellow card) 79'; Nikolias (yellow card) 90+2'	Stadium: Olympic Stadium; Attendance: 7,504; Referee: Athanasios Sezos (Kilkis); Man of the Match: Marko Livaja

1 September 2018 2	Asteras Tripolis	0–1	AEK Athens	Tripoli
20:30 EEST (UTC+3)	Kotsiras (yellow card) 32'; Triantafyllopoulos (yellow card) 60'	Report	Ponce (yellow card) 23'; Mantalos 33' (pen.), (yellow card) 44'; Alef (yellow card) 85'; Oikonomou (yellow card) 89'	Stadium: Theodoros Kolokotronis Stadium; Attendance: 3,844; Referee: Ioannis Papadopoulos (Macedonia); Man of the Match: Marko Livaja

15 September 2018 3	AEK Athens	4–0	Panionios	Marousi
19:30 EEST (UTC+3)	Ponce 45+1'; Bakasetas 58'; Klonaridis 84', 90+2'	Report	Domingues (yellow card) 65'	Stadium: Olympic Stadium; Attendance: 10,433; Referee: Evangelos Evangelou (Athens); Man of the Match: Petros Mantalos

23 September 2018 4	PAOK	2–0	AEK Athens	Thessaloniki
19:30 EEST (UTC+3)	Maurício (yellow card) 22'; Prijović 29', 59'; Jabá (yellow card) 78'	Report	Mantalos (yellow card) 33'	Stadium: Toumba Stadium; Attendance: 23,763; Referee: Mattias Gestranius (Finland); Man of the Match: Aleksandar Prijović

29 September 2018 5	OFI	0–3	AEK Athens	Heraklion
19:30 EEST (UTC+3)	Komesidis (red card) 30'; Vouho (yellow card) 36'; Potouridis (yellow card) 90+2'	Report	Bakasetas 20', (yellow card) 33'; Galo 32'; Galanopoulos (yellow card) 36'; Ponce 64'; Giakoumakis (yellow card) 90+2'	Stadium: Theodoros Vardinogiannis Stadium; Attendance: 4,701; Referee: Anastasios Sidiropoulos (Dodecanese); Man of the Match: Rodrigo Galo

7 October 2018 6	AEK Athens	1–1	Olympiacos	Marousi
19:30 EEST (UTC+3)	Livaja (yellow card) 46'; Morán (yellow card) 76'; Bakasetas 90'	Report	Fortounis 58'; Vuković (yellow card) 65'	Stadium: Olympic Stadium; Attendance: 27,419; Referee: Mads-Kristoffer Kristoffersen (Denmark); Man of the Match: Kostas Fortounis
Note: AEK were punished with a 3-point deduction, 2 matches behind closed doors and a fine of €73,250 due to fan incidents outside the stadium during the match.

20 October 2018 7	Apollon Smyrnis	0–2	AEK Athens	Rizoupoli
18:00 EEST (UTC+3)	Orihuela (yellow card) 79'	Report	Mantalos 37'; Livaja (yellow card) 42', (goal) 85'; Simões (yellow card) 45+1'; Galo (yellow card) 83'	Stadium: Georgios Kamaras Stadium; Attendance: 3,002; Referee: Evangelos Gratsanis (Trikala); Man of the Match: Petros Mantalos

28 October 2018 8	AEK Athens	4–0	Aris	Marousi
18:30 EET (UTC+2)	Boyé 5'; Ponce 56', 62'; Livaja 72'; Mantalos (yellow card) 87'	Report	Konstantinidis (yellow card) 16'; Colazo (yellow card) 23'; Diguiny (yellow card) 65'; Matilla (yellow card) 87'	Stadium: Olympic Stadium; Attendance: Behind closed doors Referee: Athanasios Tzilos (Larissa); Man of the Match: Lucas Boyé

3 November 2018 9	Panathinaikos	0–0	AEK Athens	Marousi
19:00 EET (UTC+2)	Donis (yellow card) 23'; Mavrommatis (yellow card) 46'; Johansson (yellow card) 86'	Report	Livaja (yellow card) 10'; Simões (yellow card) 57'	Stadium: Olympic Stadium; Attendance: 24,731; Referee: Oliver Drachta (Austria); Man of the Match: Dimitrios Kourbelis

11 November 2018 10	AEK Athens	0–2	Atromitos	Marousi
15:00 EET (UTC+2)	Alef (yellow card) 63'; Livaja (yellow card) 81'; Gianniotas (yellow card) 84'; Simões (yellow card) 86'	Report	Madson (yellow card) 73'; Kivrakidis (yellow card) 82'; Risvanis 88'; Koulouris 90'	Stadium: Olympic Stadium; Attendance: Behind closed doors Referee: Aristotelis Diamantopoulos (Arcadia); Man of the Match: Spyros Risvanis

24 November 2018 11	Panetolikos	2–1	AEK Athens	Agrinio
19:00 EET (UTC+2)	Kamara 26', 51', (yellow card) 52'; Chantakias (yellow card) 70'; Maná (yellow card) 82'; Kyriakidis (yellow card) 89'; Marinakis (yellow card) 90+4'	Report	Alef (yellow card) 34'; Simões 76'; Ćosić (yellow card) 90+3'	Stadium: Panetolikos Stadium; Attendance: 3,541; Referee: Manolis Skoulas (Thessaly); Man of the Match: Alhassan Kamara

2 December 2018 12	AEK Athens	2–0	Xanthi	Marousi
19:30 EET (UTC+2)	Ponce 8'; Livaja 90'	Report	Kovačević (yellow card) 45'; Casado (yellow card) 71'; Brito (yellow card) 73'; Chatziterzoglou (yellow card) 80'; Camara (yellow card) 90+2'	Stadium: Olympic Stadium; Attendance: 6,114; Referee: Fotis Fotiadis (Kastoria); Man of the Match: Ezequiel Ponce

8 December 2018 13	AEK Athens	2–0	Lamia	Marousi
19:30 EET (UTC+2)	Ponce 13'; Anastasiadis 47' (o.g.); Ćosić (yellow card) 85'	Report	Skondras (yellow card) 67'; Barrales (yellow card) 71'	Stadium: Olympic Stadium; Attendance: 5,541; Referee: Anastasios Papapetrou (Athens); Man of the Match: Ezequiel Ponce

16 December 2018 14	AEL	0–0	AEK Athens	Larissa
17:15 EET (UTC+2)	Acosta (yellow card) 43'; Kristinsson (yellow card) 90+2'	Report	Hult (yellow card) 12'; Oikonomou (yellow card) 79'; Gianniotas (yellow card) 824'	Stadium: AEL FC Arena; Attendance: 2,855; Referee: Praxitelis Zachariadis (Macedonia); Man of the Match: Marko Livaja

30 January 2019 15	AEK Athens	1–0	Levadiakos	Marousi
17:15 EET (UTC+2)	Ponce 26'; Alef (yellow card) 45'; Bakasetas (yellow card) 61'; Klonaridis (yellow card) 77'; Ćosić (yellow card) 84'	Report	Tsabouris (yellow card) 58'; Zisopoulos (yellow card) 61'; Rekhviashvili (yellow card) 85'	Stadium: Olympic Stadium; Attendance: 5,124; Referee: Konstantinos Kotsanis (Drama); Man of the Match: Ezequiel Ponce

14 January 2019 16	PAS Giannina	0–4	AEK Athens	Ioannina
19:30 EET (UTC+2)	Athanasiadis (yellow card) 4', (penalty missed) 90+2; Krizman (yellow card) 11'	Report	Mantalos 5' (pen.); Bakasetas (yellow card) 7'; Michail 20' (o.g.); Oikonomou (yellow card) 43'; Ponce 45', 45+3'	Stadium: Zosimades Stadium; Attendance: 2,800; Referee: Stefanos Koubarakis (Thrace); Man of the Match: Ezequiel Ponce

20 January 2019 17	AEK Athens	3–0	Asteras Tripolis	Marousi
19:30 EET (UTC+2)	Livaja 9'; Alef 11', (yellow card) 29'; Ponce 20' (pen.); Oikonomou (yellow card) 30'; Mantalos (yellow card) 41'; Galo (yellow card) 76'	Report	Manias (yellow card) 41'; Iglesias (yellow card) 66'; Kaltsas (yellow card) 90+2'	Stadium: Olympic Stadium; Attendance: 7,518; Referee: Vasilis Fotias (Pella); Man of the Match: Ezequiel Ponce

26 January 2019 18	Panionios	0–2	AEK Athens	Nea Smyrni
19:30 EET (UTC+2)	Durmishaj (yellow card) 36'; Kurdi (yellow card) 75'	Report	Mantalos 14'; Hult (yellow card) 24'; Bakakis (yellow card) 68'; Ponce 90+2'	Stadium: Nea Smyrni Stadium; Attendance: 2,126; Referee: Evangelos Evangelou (Athens); Man of the Match: Ezequiel Ponce

3 February 2019 19	AEK Athens	1–1	PAOK	Marousi
19:30 EET (UTC+2)	Ponce 74'; Krstičić (yellow card) 46'; Klonaridis (yellow card) 89'; Boyé (yellow card) 90+2'	Report	Maurício 10'; Shakhov (yellow card) 18'; Jabá (yellow card) 23' (yellow-red card) 32'; Vieirinha (yellow card) 32'; Paschalakis (yellow card) 40'	Stadium: Olympic Stadium; Attendance: 24,291; Referee: Michael Tykgaard (Denmark); Man of the Match: Ezequiel Ponce

10 February 2019 20	AEK Athens	1–0	OFI	Marousi
15:00 EET (UTC+2)	Livaja 37', (yellow card) 76'; Simões (yellow card) 79'; Gianniotas (yellow card) 87'	Report	Nastos (yellow card) 56'; Kyriakidis (yellow card) 64'; Mihojević (yellow card) 79'	Stadium: Olympic Stadium; Attendance: 7,580; Referee: Georgios Vreskas (Pieria); Man of the Match: Christos Albanis

17 February 2019 21	Olympiacos	4–1	AEK Athens	Piraeus
19:30 EET (UTC+2)	Camara 50', (yellow card) 71'; Fortounis 72', 87'; Hassan 83'; Guilherme (yellow card) 89'	Report	Ponce 3'; Oikonomou (yellow card) 40'; Galanopoulos (yellow card) 90+2'	Stadium: Karaiskakis Stadium; Attendance: 29,010; Referee: Tobias Stieler (Germany); Man of the Match: Kostas Fortounis

23 February 2019 22	AEK Athens	2–1	Apollon Smyrnis	Marousi
19:30 EET (UTC+2)	Boyé 4', 47'; Livaja (yellow card) 49'; Ćosić (yellow card) 74'	Report	El-Helwe 24'; Bedinelli (yellow card) 49'; Varkas (yellow card) 62'; Huanderson (yellow card) 74'	Stadium: Olympic Stadium; Attendance: 1,594; Referee: Fotios Fotiadis (Kastoria); Man of the Match: Lucas Boyé

2 March 2019 23	Aris	2–0	AEK Athens	Thessaloniki
19:00 EET (UTC+2)	Larsson 32'; Diguiny (yellow card) 43'; Rose 69'; Valerianos (yellow card) 73'	Report	Alef (yellow card) 16'; Ponce (yellow card) 67'; Simões (yellow card) 75'; Ćosić (yellow card) 82'	Stadium: Kleanthis Vikelidis Stadium; Attendance: 9,668; Referee: Aristotelis Diamantopoulos (Arcadia); Man of the Match: Daniel Larsson

9 March 2019 24	AEK Athens	0–0	Panathinaikos	Marousi
19:30 EET (UTC+2)	Ponce (yellow card) 54'	Report	Altman (yellow card) 55'; Johansson (yellow card) 56'; V. Ikonomou (yellow card) 56'; Chatzitheodoridis (yellow card) 90+1'; Emmanouilidis (yellow card) 90+5'	Stadium: Olympic Stadium; Attendance: 10,145; Referee: Tobias Welz (Germany); Man of the Match: Michalis Bakakis

17 March 2019 25	Atromitos	0–1	AEK Athens	Peristeri
16:00 EET (UTC+2)	Madson (yellow card) 55'	Report	Bakasetas (yellow card) 68'; Albanis 85'	Stadium: Peristeri Stadium; Attendance: 907; Referee: Srđan Jovanović (Serbia); Man of the Match: Christos Albanis

31 March 2019 26	AEK Athens	4–0	Panetolikos	Marousi
17:15 EEST (UTC+3)	Oikonomou 39'; Malis 50' (o.g.); Boyé 82'; Galanopoulos 84'	Report	Mazurek (yellow card) 37'	Stadium: Olympic Stadium; Attendance: 5,258; Referee: Vasilis Fotias (Pella); Man of the Match: Marios Oikonomou

7 April 2019 27	Xanthi	1–3	AEK Athens	Xanthi
16:00 EEST (UTC+3)	Castro 33', (yellow card) 90+4'; Jendrišek (yellow card) 58'; Barrientos (yellow card) 90+4'	Report	Galo (yellow card) 27'; Mantalos (yellow card) 60'; Oikonomou 68'; Ponce 70'; Livaja (yellow card) 86'; Boyé (yellow card) 90', (goal) 90+2'	Stadium: Xanthi FC Arena; Attendance: 2,166; Referee: Aristotelis Diamantopoulos (Arcadia); Man of the Match: Ezequiel Ponce

14 April 2019 28	Lamia	2–2	AEK Athens	Lamia
19:00 EEST (UTC+3)	Barrales 34' (pen.), 53'; Vasilantonopoulos (yellow card) 72'	Report	Svarnas (yellow card) 18'; Mantalos 4', (yellow card) 33'; Ćosić (yellow card) 44'; Simões (yellow card) 65'; Boyé 67'	Stadium: Lamia Municipal Stadium; Attendance: 2,459; Referee: Emmanouil Skoulas (Thessaly); Man of the Match: Jerónimo Barrales

21 April 2019 29	AEK Athens	0–1	AEL	Marousi
19:00 EEST (UTC+3)	Ponce (yellow card) 44'	Report	Bralić 28'; Žižić (yellow card) 53'; Šećerović (yellow card) 74'; Živković (yellow card) 90+4'	Stadium: Olympic Stadium; Attendance: 6,556; Referee: Praxitelis Zachariadis (Macedonia); Man of the Match: Slavko Bralić

5 May 2019 30	Levadiakos	0–3	AEK Athens	Livadeia
19:00 EEST (UTC+3)	Nikas (yellow card) 27'; Nangis (red card) 62'	Report	Bakasetas 45'; Livaja 54'; Ponce 67'; Chyhrynskyi (yellow card) 72'	Stadium: Levadia Municipal Stadium; Attendance: 1,468; Referee: Efstathios Gortsilas (Macedonia); Man of the Match: Petros Mantalos

=== Greek Cup ===
==== Group B ====
Pos	Team	Pld	W	D	L	GF	GA	GD	Pts	Qualification	AEK	LAM	VOL	APL
1	AEK Athens	3	3	0	0	9	2	+7	9	Round of 16		2–1	—	—
2	Lamia	3	1	1	1	9	3	+6	4	Round of 16	—		1–1	—
3	Volos	3	1	1	1	7	5	+2	4		1–3	—		5–1
4	Apollon Larissa	3	0	0	3	1	16	−15	0		0–4	0–7	—	

Source: epo.gr
Rules for classification: 1. Points 2. Head-to-head points 3. Head-to-head goal difference 4. Goals scored 5. Goals against 6. Play-offs (neutral ground).

==== Matches ====
===== Group stage =====
12 October 2018 1	AEK Athens	2–1	Lamia	Kallithea
17:00 EEST (UTC+3)	Gianniotas (yellow card) 35'; Morán (yellow card) 42'; Botos (yellow card) 58'; Giakoumakis 73'; Svarnas (yellow card) 78'; Galo 87'	Report	Osman (yellow card) 23'; Epstein 64'; Adejo (yellow card) 85'	Stadium: Grigoris Lambrakis Stadium; Attendance: 2,000; Referee: Athanasios Tzilos (Larissa)

31 October 2018 2	Apollon Larissa	0–4	AEK Athens	Larissa
15:00 EET (UTC+2)	Kourtesiotis (yellow card) 58'; Bimai (yellow card) 69'	Report	Alef 41'; Agiotis 45' (o.g.); Botos 76'; Sardelis 90'	Stadium: Apollon Ground; Attendance: 1,500; Referee: Stefanos Koubarakis (Thrace)

20 December 2018 3	Volos	1–3	AEK Athens	Volos
15:00 EET (UTC+2)	Pispas 6', (yellow card) 63'; Ngwem (yellow card) 42'; Iliopoulos (yellow card) 74'; Roussos (yellow card) 90+4'	Report	Morán 4'; Ćosić (yellow card) 32'; Livaja 59', 71'	Stadium: Neapoli Municipal Stadium; Referee: Ioannis Papadopoulos (Macedonia)

===== Round of 16 =====
9 January 2019 First leg	AO Chania−Kissamikos	1–1	AEK Athens	Chania
19:30 EET (UTC+2)	Zioulis (yellow card) 55'; Riski 90+3'	Report	Ponce 37'; Chyhrynskyi (yellow card) 67'; Morán (yellow card) 78'; Bakakis (yellow card) 86'	Stadium: Perivolia Municipal Stadium; Referee: Anastasios Papapetrou (Athens)

23 January 2019 Second leg	AEK Athens	5–0 (6–1 agg.)	AO Chania−Kissamikos	Marousi
17:15 EET (UTC+2)	Galo 21'; Krstičić 28'; Mantalos 57' (pen.); Livaja 78', 82'	Report	Tegousis (yellow card) 26'	Stadium: Olympic Stadium; Attendance: 1,751; Referee: Alexandros Tsamouris (Piraeus)

===== Quarter-finals =====
7 February 2019 First leg	Atromitos	0–1	AEK Athens	Peristeri
19:30 EET (UTC+2)	Bušuladžić (yellow card) 33'; Karasalidis (yellow card) 85'	Report	Bakakis (yellow card) 9'; Ponce (yellow card) 33' (yellow-red card) 89', (goal) 86' (pen.)	Stadium: Peristeri Stadium; Referee: Anastasios Sidiropoulos (Dodecanese)
Note: At the 56th minute the game was stopped until the 75th minute, due to a drop in the lighting of the pitch.

26 February 2019 Second leg	AEK Athens	3–0 (4–0 agg.)	Atromitos	Marousi
19:30 EET (UTC+2)	Ponce 11'; Ćosić (yellow card) 21'; Mantalos 51', 71'	Report	Risvanis (yellow card) 26'	Stadium: Olympic Stadium; Attendance: 5,517; Referee: Anastasios Papapetrou (Athens)

===== Semi-finals =====
3 April 2019 First leg	AEK Athens	2–0	Lamia	Marousi
21:30 EEST (UTC+3)	Krstičić (yellow card) 21', (goal) 90+1'; Oikonomou (yellow card) 40'; Ponce (yellow card) 45', (goal) 63'	Report	Barrales (yellow card) 21'; Bejarano (yellow card) 67'; Karipidis (yellow card) 78'	Stadium: Olympic Stadium; Attendance: 12,325; Referee: Ioannis Papadopoulos (Macedonia)

25 April 2019 Second leg	Lamia	0–4 (0–6 agg.)	AEK Athens	Lamia
18:00 EEST (UTC+3)	Barrales (yellow card) 3'; Skondras (yellow card) 21'	Report	Ponce (yellow card) 16', (goal) 36'; Oikonomou 41'; Bakasetas 53'; Bakakis (yellow card) 56'; Vanderson 66' (o.g.)	Stadium: Lamia Municipal Stadium; Referee: Athanasios Tzilos (Larissa)

===== Final =====
11 May 2019 Final	PAOK	1–0	AEK Athens	Marousi
20:30 EEST (UTC+3)	Akpom (yellow card) 38', (goal) 45+1'	Report	Oikonomou (yellow card) 25'; Livaja (yellow card) 29'; Krstičić (yellow card) 43'; Ponce (yellow card) 67'; Galo (yellow card) 90+7'	Stadium: Olympic Stadium; Attendance: 1,040; Referee: Felix Zwayer (Germany); Man of the Match: Chuba Akpom

=== UEFA Champions League ===
==== Third qualifying round ====
The draw for the third qualifying round was held on 23 July 2018.

8 August 2018 First leg	Celtic (Scotland)	1–1	(Greece) AEK Athens	Glasgow, Scotland
21:45 EEST (UTC+3)	McGregor 17'; Ajer (yellow card) 49'	Report	Klonaridis (yellow card) 14', (goal) 44'; Galanopoulos (yellow card) 50' (yellow-red card) 57'; Oikonomou (yellow card) 68'	Stadium: Celtic Park; Attendance: 54,370; Referee: Luca Banti (Italy)

14 August 2018 Second leg	AEK Athens (Greece)	2–1 (3–2 agg.)	(Scotland) Celtic	Athens, Greece
21:00 EEST (UTC+3)	Galo 6', (yellow card) 53'; Livaja (yellow card) 42', (goal) 50'; Mantalos (yellow card) 90'	Report	Brown (yellow card) 68'; Sinclair 78'; Griffiths (yellow card) 79'	Stadium: Olympic Stadium; Attendance: 25,183; Referee: Vladislav Bezborodov (Russia)

==== Play-off round ====
The draw for the play-off round was held on 6 August 2018.

22 August 2018 First leg	MOL Vidi (Hungary)	1–2	(Greece) AEK Athens	Budapest, Hungary
22:00 EEST (UTC+3)	Huszti (red card) 22'; Lazović (yellow card) 25', (goal) 68'; Nego (yellow card) 31'	Report	Klonaridis (yellow card) 25', (goal) 34'; Galanopoulos (yellow card) 37'; Bakasetas 49', (red card) 53'	Stadium: Groupama Arena; Attendance: 10,681; Referee: Gianluca Rocchi (Italy)

28 August 2018 Second leg	AEK Athens (Greece)	1–1 (3–2 agg.)	(Hungary) MOL Vidi	Athens, Greece
22:00 EEST (UTC+3)	Mantalos 48' (pen.); Simões (yellow card) 80'; Lopes (red card) 80'; Hult (yellow card) 90+8'; Livaja (red card) 90+8'	Report	Nikolov (yellow card) 7'; Nego (yellow card) 38', (goal) 57'; Hadžić (yellow card) 42'; Fiola (yellow card) 47'; Juhász (yellow card) 90+1'; Lazović (yellow card) 90+8'	Stadium: Olympic Stadium; Attendance: 29,774; Referee: Szymon Marciniak (Poland)

==== Group stage ====
The group stage draw was held on 30 August 2018.

===== Matches =====
Pos	Team	Pld	W	D	L	GF	GA	GD	Pts	Qualification	BAY	AJX	BEN	AEK
1	(Germany) Bayern Munich	6	4	2	0	15	5	+10	14	Advance to knockout phase	—	1–1	5–1	2–0
2	(Netherlands) Ajax	6	3	3	0	11	5	+6	12	Advance to knockout phase	3–3	—	1–0	3–0
3	(Portugal) Benfica	6	2	1	3	6	11	−5	7	Transfer to Europa League	0–2	1–1	—	1–0
4	(Greece) AEK Athens	6	0	0	6	2	13	−11	0		0–2	0–2	2–3	—

Source: UEFA
Rules for classification: Group stage tiebreakers

19 September 2018 1	Ajax (Netherlands)	3–0	(Greece) AEK Athens	Amsterdam, Netherlands
19:55 EEST (UTC+3)	Tagliafico 46', 90', (yellow card) 77'; De Jong (yellow card) 74'; Ziyech (yellow card) 74'; Van de Beek 77'	Report	Alef (yellow card) 72'; Mantalos (yellow card) 74'	Stadium: Johan Cruyff Arena; Attendance: 52,285; Referee: Carlos del Cerro Grande (Spain)

2 October 2018 2	AEK Athens (Greece)	2–3	(Portugal) Benfica	Athens, Greece
22:00 EEST (UTC+3)	Ponce (yellow card) 34'; Bakasetas (yellow card) 40'; Klonaridis 53', 63'	Report	Seferovic 6'; Dias (yellow card) 8' (yellow-red card) 45+4'; Grimaldo 15', (yellow card) 90+3'; Semedo 74'; Almeida (yellow card) 79'	Stadium: Olympic Stadium; Attendance: 31,154; Referee: Orel Grinfeld (Israel)

23 October 2018 3	AEK Athens (Greece)	0–2	(Germany) Bayern Munich	Athens, Greece
19:55 EEST (UTC+3)		Report	Martínez 61'; Lewandowski 63'	Stadium: Olympic Stadium; Attendance: 56,865; Referee: Aleksei Kulbakov (Belarus)

7 November 2018 4	Bayern Munich (Germany)	2–0	(Greece) AEK Athens	Munich, Germany
22:00 EET (UTC+2)	Lewandowski 31' (pen.), 71'	Report	Ćosić (yellow card) 29'; Simões (yellow card) 64'; Lampropoulos (yellow card) 67'	Stadium: Allianz Arena; Attendance: 70,000; Referee: Matej Jug (Slovenia)

27 November 2018 5	AEK Athens (Greece)	0–2	(Netherlands) Ajax	Athens, Greece
19:55 EET (UTC+2)	Oikonomou (yellow card) 29'; Chyhrynskyi (yellow card) 51'; Livaja (yellow card) 53' (yellow-red card) 67'; Giakoumakis (yellow card) 90'	Report	Schöne (yellow card) 19'; Mazraoui (yellow card) 60'; Tadić 68' (pen.), 72'	Stadium: Olympic Stadium; Attendance: 25,756; Referee: Michael Oliver (England)

12 December 2018 6	Benfica (Portugal)	1–0	(Greece) AEK Athens	Lisbon, Portugal
22:00 EET (UTC+2)	Dias (yellow card) 37'; Grimaldo 88'	Report	Hult (yellow card) 73'; Galanopoulos (yellow card) 82' (yellow-red card) 87'	Stadium: Estádio da Luz; Attendance: 33,633; Referee: Bobby Madden (Scotland)

== Statistics ==
=== Squad statistics ===
As of 11 May 2019

No.	Pos	Player	Super League		Greek Cup		Champions League		Total	
No.	Pos	Player	Apps	Goals	Apps	Goals	Apps	Goals	Apps	Goals
Goalkeepers
1	GK	(Greece) Vasilis Barkas	26	0	5	0	10	0	41	0
16	GK	(Greece) Panagiotis Tsintotas	4	0	5	0	0	0	9	0
40	GK	(Greece) Makis Giannikoglou	0	0	0	0	0	0	0	0
99	GK	(Greece) Panagiotis Ginis	0	0	0	0	0	0	0	0
Defenders
2	DF	(Greece) Michalis Bakakis	25	0	7	0	10	0	42	0
3	DF	(Portugal) Hélder Lopes	6	0	0	0	3	0	9	0
4	DF	(Greece) Marios Oikonomou	21	2	7	1	8	0	36	3
5	DF	(Greece) Vasilios Lampropoulos	8	0	1	0	7	0	16	0
12	DF	(Brazil) Rodrigo Galo	26	1	8	2	7	1	41	4
15	DF	(Serbia) Uroš Ćosić	19	0	6	0	6	0	31	0
19	DF	(Ukraine) Dmytro Chyhrynskyi	15	0	6	0	5	0	26	0
23	DF	(Sweden) Niklas Hult	22	0	6	0	10	0	38	0
24	DF	(Greece) Stratos Svarnas	5	0	6	0	0	0	11	0
31	DF	(Greece) Konstantinos Stamoulis	0	0	0	0	0	0	0	0
33	DF	(Greece) Giorgos Giannoutsos	1	0	2	0	0	0	3	0
50	DF	(Greece) Michalis Bousis	0	0	0	0	0	0	0	0
—	DF	(Greece) Giannis Tsivelekidis	0	0	0	0	0	0	0	0
Midfielders
6	MF	(Serbia) Nenad Krstičić	13	0	5	2	0	0	18	2
8	MF	(Portugal) André Simões	15	1	5	0	8	0	28	1
20	MF	(Greece) Petros Mantalos	25	5	6	3	9	1	40	9
25	MF	(Greece) Konstantinos Galanopoulos	17	1	1	0	9	0	27	1
51	MF	(Greece) Giannis Sardelis	0	0	1	1	0	0	1	1
70	MF	(Greece) Giannis Fivos Botos	0	0	5	1	0	0	5	1
95	MF	(Brazil) Alef	22	1	6	1	8	0	36	2
Forwards
7	FW	(Greece) Christos Albanis	13	1	3	0	1	0	17	1
10	FW	(Croatia) Marko Livaja	25	7	8	4	5	1	38	12
11	FW	(Greece) Giannis Gianniotas	7	0	4	0	2	0	13	0
14	FW	(Greece) Anastasios Bakasetas	22	4	3	1	5	1	30	6
17	FW	(Belgium) Victor Klonaridis	22	2	6	0	9	4	37	6
22	FW	(Argentina) Ezequiel Ponce	28	16	7	5	9	0	44	21
31	FW	(Argentina) Lucas Boyé	23	6	9	0	4	0	36	6
77	FW	(Greece) Christos Giousis	1	0	3	0	0	0	4	0
Left during Winter Transfer Window
32	MF	(Greece) Paris Babis	0	0	2	0	0	0	2	0
39	MF	(Spain) Erik Morán	4	0	4	1	2	0	10	1
—	MF	(Albania) Astrit Ajdarević	0	0	1	0	0	0	1	0
9	FW	(Greece) Giorgos Giakoumakis	6	0	2	1	3	0	11	1

=== Goalscorers ===
As of 11 May 2019
The list is sorted by competition order when total goals are equal, then by position and then by squad number.

Rank	No.	Pos.	Player	Super League	Greek Cup	Champions League	Total
1	22	FW	(Argentina) Ezequiel Ponce	16	5	0	21
2	10	FW	(Croatia) Marko Livaja	7	4	1	12
3	20	MF	(Greece) Petros Mantalos	5	3	1	9
4	31	FW	(Argentina) Lucas Boye	6	0	0	6
4	14	FW	(Greece) Anastasios Bakasetas	4	1	1	6
4	28	FW	(Belgium) Victor Klonaridis	2	0	4	6
7	12	DF	(Brazil) Rodrigo Galo	1	2	1	4
8	4	DF	(Greece) Marios Oikonomou	2	1	0	3
9	95	MF	(Brazil) Alef	1	1	0	2
9	6	MF	(Serbia) Nenad Krstičić	0	2	0	2
11	25	MF	(Greece) Konstantinos Galanopoulos	1	0	0	1
11	8	MF	(Portugal) André Simões	1	0	0	1
11	39	MF	(Spain) Erik Morán	0	1	0	1
11	9	FW	(Greece) Giorgos Giakoumakis	0	1	0	1
11	70	MF	(Greece) Giannis Fivos Botos	0	1	0	1
11	51	MF	(Greece) Giannis Sardelis	0	1	0	1
11	7	FW	(Greece) Christos Albanis	0	1	0	1
Own goals				3	2	0	5
Totals				49	26	8	83

=== Assists ===
As of 11 May 2019
The list is sorted by competition order when total assists are equal, then by position and then by squad number.

Rank	No.	Pos.	Player	Super League	Greek Cup	Champions League	Total
1	20	MF	(Greece) Petros Mantalos	6	3	1	10
2	10	FW	(Croatia) Marko Livaja	6	2	0	8
3	12	DF	(Brazil) Rodrigo Galo	5	1	0	6
4	22	FW	(Argentina) Ezequiel Ponce	4	0	0	4
5	2	DF	(Greece) Michalis Bakakis	3	0	0	3
5	14	FW	(Greece) Anastasios Bakasetas	2	0	1	3
7	28	FW	(Belgium) Victor Klonaridis	1	1	0	2
7	31	FW	(Argentina) Lucas Boye	1	1	0	2
7	9	FW	(Greece) Giorgos Giakoumakis	0	2	0	2
7	3	DF	(Portugal) Hélder Lopes	0	0	2	2
7	23	DF	(Sweden) Niklas Hult	0	0	2	2
12	19	DF	(Ukraine) Dmytro Chyhrynskyi	1	0	0	1
12	25	MF	(Greece) Konstantinos Galanopoulos	1	0	0	1
12	7	FW	(Greece) Christos Albanis	1	0	0	1
12	24	DF	(Greece) Stratos Svarnas	0	1	0	1
12	5	DF	(Greece) Vasilios Lampropoulos	0	0	1	1
12	4	DF	(Greece) Marios Oikonomou	0	0	1	1
Totals				31	11	8	50

=== Clean sheets ===
As of 11 May 2019
The list is sorted by competition order when total clean sheets are equal and then by squad number. Clean sheets in games where both goalkeepers participated are awarded to the goalkeeper who started the game. Goalkeepers with no appearances are not included.

Rank	No.	Player	Super League	Greek Cup	Champions League	Total
1	1	(Greece) Vasilis Barkas	18	4	0	22
2	16	(Greece) Panagiotis Tsintotas	1	2	0	3
Totals			19	6	0	25

=== Disciplinary record ===
As of 11 May 2019

N	P	Nat.	Name	Super League			Greek Cup			Champions League			Total			Notes
N	P	Nat.	Name	Yellow card	Second yellow card	Red card	Yellow card	Second yellow card	Red card	Yellow card	Second yellow card	Red card	Yellow card	Second yellow card	Red card	Notes
Goalkeepers
1	GK	(Greece)	Vasilis Barkas													
16	GK	(Greece)	Panagiotis Tsintotas													
40	GK	(Greece)	Makis Giannikoglou													
99	GK	(Greece)	Panagiotis Ginis													
Defenders
2	DF	(Greece)	Michalis Bakakis	1			3						4			
3	DF	(Portugal)	Hélder Lopes													
4	DF	(Greece)	Marios Oikonomou	5			2			2			9			
5	DF	(Greece)	Vasilios Lampropoulos							1			1			
12	DF	(Brazil)	Rodrigo Galo	3			1			1			5			
15	DF	(Serbia)	Uroš Ćosić	6			2			1			9			
19	DF	(Ukraine)	Dmytro Chyhrynskyi	1			1			1			3			
23	DF	(Sweden)	Niklas Hult	2						2			4			
24	DF	(Greece)	Stratos Svarnas	1			1						2			
31	DF	(Greece)	Konstantinos Stamoulis													
33	DF	(Greece)	Giorgos Giannoutsos													
50	DF	(Greece)	Michalis Bousis													
—	DF	(Greece)	Giannis Tsivelekidis													
Midfielders
6	MF	(Serbia)	Nenad Krstičić	1			2						3			
8	MF	(Portugal)	André Simões	6						2			8			
20	MF	(Greece)	Petros Mantalos	6						2			8			
25	MF	(Greece)	Konstantinos Galanopoulos	2						5	2		7	2		
51	MF	(Greece)	Giannis Sardelis													
70	MF	(Greece)	Giannis Fivos Botos				1						1			
95	MF	(Brazil)	Alef	6						1			7			
Forwards
7	FW	(Greece)	Christos Albanis													
10	FW	(Croatia)	Marko Livaja	7			1			3	1	1	11	1	1	
11	FW	(Greece)	Giannis Gianniotas	3			1						4			
14	FW	(Greece)	Anastasios Bakasetas	4						1		1	5		1	
17	FW	(Belgium)	Victor Klonaridis	3						2			5			
22	FW	(Argentina)	Ezequiel Ponce	5			5	1		1			11	1		
31	FW	(Argentina)	Lucas Boyé	2			1						3			
77	FW	(Greece)	Christos Giousis													
Left during Winter Transfer window
32	MF	(Greece)	Paris Babis													
39	MF	(Spain)	Erik Morán	1			2						3			
—	MF	(Albania)	Astrit Ajdarević													
9	FW	(Greece)	Giorgos Giakoumakis	1						1			2			

=== Starting 11 ===
This section presents the most frequently used formation along with the players with the most starts across all competitions.

N.	Formation	Matchday(s)
25	4–4–2	1–9, 11, 14, 21, 24, 30
15	3–5–2	15–20, 23, 25, 26, 29
8	4–2–3–1	10, 12, 13, 22, 27, 28
2	4–3–3

No.	Nat.	Player	Pos.
1	(Greece)	Vasilis Barkas	GK
4	(Greece)	Marios Oikonomou	RCB
19	(Ukraine)	Dmytro Chyhrynskyi	LCB
2	(Greece)	Michalis Bakakis	RB
23	(Sweden)	Niklas Hult	LB
8	(Portugal)	André Simões	DM
20	(Greece)	Petros Mantalos (C)	CM
12	(Brazil)	Rodrigo Galo	RM
14	(Greece)	Anastasios Bakasetas	LM
10	(Croatia)	Marko Livaja	SS
22	(Argentina)	Ezequiel Ponce	CF

Last updated: 2019-05-11
