= Ezequiel Ponce =

Argentine footballer (1997)

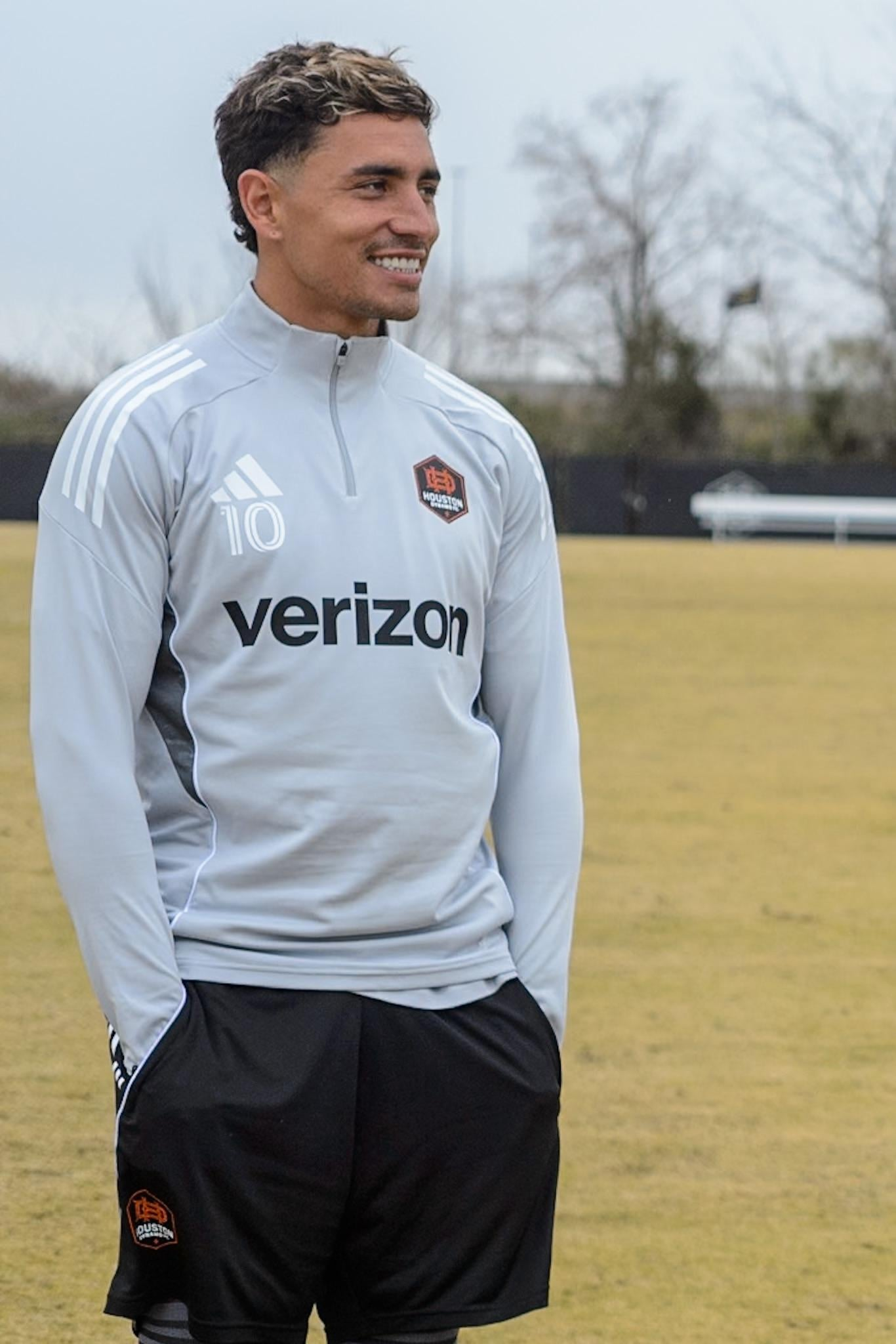
- Ponce with Houston Dynamo in 2025

Personal information
- Full name: Ezequiel Ponce Martínez
- Date of birth: 29 March 1997 (age 29)
- Place of birth: Rosario, Argentina
- Height: 1.81 m (5 ft 11 in)
- Position: Forward

Team information
- Current team: Elche
- Number: 9

Youth career
- 2005–2013: Newell's Old Boys

Senior career*
Years	Team	Apps	(Gls)
2013–2015	Newell's Old Boys	27	(5)
2015–2019	Roma	0	(0)
2016–2017	→ Granada (loan)	25	(2)
2017–2018	→ Lille (loan)	32	(2)
2018–2019	→ AEK Athens (loan)	27	(16)
2019–2022	Spartak Moscow	59	(19)
2022	→ Elche (loan)	13	(1)
2022–2023	Elche	34	(4)
2023–2024	AEK Athens	29	(15)
2024–2026	Houston Dynamo	59	(15)
2026–	Elche	0	(0)

International career
2017	Argentina U20	3	(0)
2019–2021	Argentina U23	8	(3)
- * Club domestic league appearances and goals as of 14 August 2026

Ezequiel Ponce Martínez (Spanish pronunciation: [eseˈkjel ˈponse]; born 29 March 1997) is an Argentine professional footballer who plays as a forward for La Liga club Elche.

== Club career ==
=== Newell's Old Boys ===
Ponce is a youth exponent from his hometown club Newell's Old Boys. Predictably, Ponce was snapped up by local club Newell's Old Boys at the age of eight, progressing through the youth set-up to eventually break into the senior squad in 2013. He made his league debut on 5 October 2013 against Quilmes in a 0–2 away win. At 16 March 2014, he scored his first league goal for the club against Racing Club in a 2–0 home win.

=== Roma ===
In August 2015, Italian club Roma announced the signing of Ponce from Newell's Old Boys for a fee of €4.2 million. Ponce started well with Roma by tallying three goals in the UEFA Youth League group stages, but disaster struck in December, as the striker received a torn ligament in his knee, which kept him on the sidelines for four months. He returned to action with a bang in the spring, playing in their reserve squad, winning the Campionato Nazionale Primavera and scoring nine goals in ten matches. He was also summoned to Roma's senior team without being given a chance on the pitch.

==== Loan to Granada ====
On 5 August 2016, Ponce was loaned to La Liga club Granada CF for one year. Fifteen days later he scored on his club debut, in a 1–1 home draw against Villarreal CF.

==== Loan to Lille ====
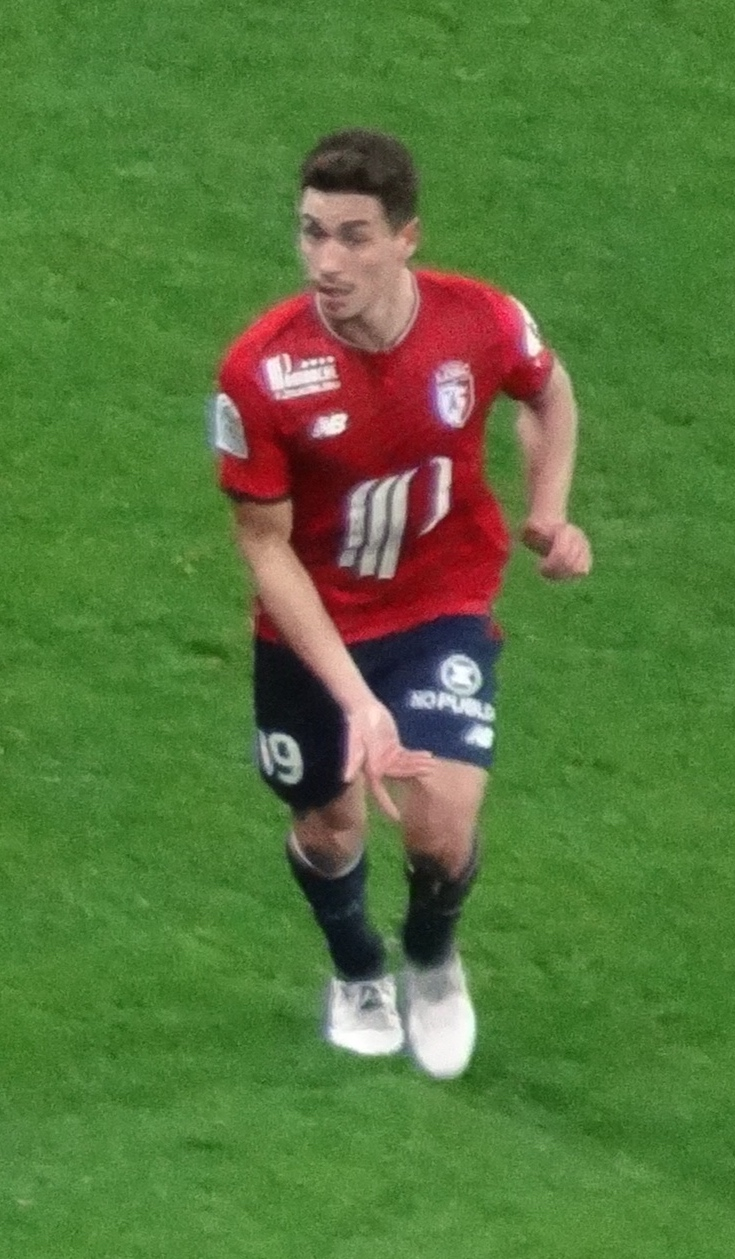
Ponce playing for Ligue 1 club Lille.

On 10 July 2017, after being identified by then Manager Marcelo Bielsa, Ponce was loaned to Ligue 1 club Lille. He made his debut in a 3–0 win against Nantes on 6 August 2017. He scored his first goal on 17 November in a 3–1 win against AS Saint-Étienne.

==== Loan to AEK Athens ====
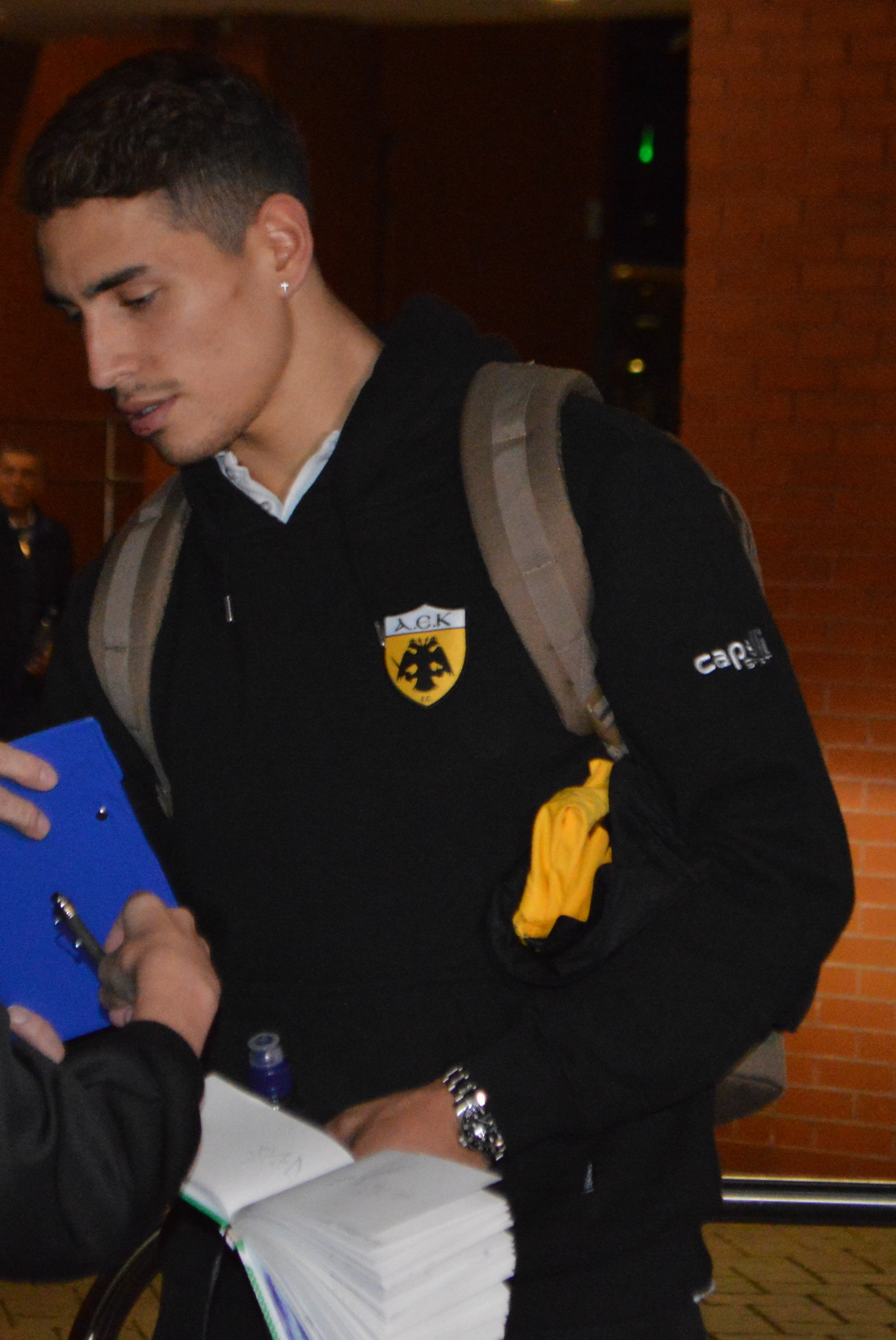
Ponce pictured during his time at Super League club AEK Athens.

On 19 July 2018, Ponce was loaned to Greek Super League club AEK Athens for one year with a €6 million buy-out. Roma would be entitled to 30% of any resale, although the loan notes that can be eliminated if AEK pays an extra €1 million. The striker is a hard worker, but looking at aspects that need to be improved, he certainly has to start scoring more goals. When joining AEK, Ponce pointed out his excitement at the opportunity to display his talents in the UEFA Champions League. "We all want to play in the Champions League; it’s our main goal. I am glad to be an AEK player, I’m impressed with the people I’ve met, and we must be a united team." he said. On 25 August 2018, he scored his first goal for the 2018–19 season in a 2–0 home win game against PAS Giannina as he was in the right place at the right time to convert a superb cross from Marko Livaja. On 16 September 2018, he scored in a 4–0 home win game against Panionios from close range after Petros Mantalos sweet and precise cross. On 29 September 2018, Ponce scored his third goal for the club in an away match against OFI, after the ball ricocheted of his body and ended up in the unguarded net to seal a 3–0 away win.

On 28 October 2018, the on-loan Roma forward netted a double within six second-half minutes in a hammering 4–0 home win game against Aris Thessaloniki. On 2 December 2018, he opened the score in a 2–0 home win against Xanthi. On 8 December 2018, he scored with a wonderful volley, after Petros Mantalos' excellent ball, in a 2–0 home win against Lamia. On 14 January 2019, Ponce rose highest to head home powerfully from a pin-point Rodrigo Galo corner, and there was still time for one more goal before half-time as Ponce rose to head home again in the third minute of added time from a great Marko Livaja's cross. On 20 January 2019, he netted with a penalty kick in a comfortable 3–0 home win game against Asteras Tripolis. On 26 January 2019, he scored in the second minute of added time sealing a 2–0 away win against Panionios. On 3 February 2019, the Argentinian winger continued his rich vein of scoring form in style, rising to meet a superb cross from Marko Livaja and glance the ball into the bottom left corner past the dive of Alexandros Paschalakis in a 1–1 draw in an absorbing derby clash at the Olympic Stadium. On 17 February 2019, he opened the score as AEK got off to a dream start in the third minute when Viktor Klonaridis intercepted a pass from Olympiacos defender Jagoš Vuković and the lightning fast winger surged forward and sent over a low cross which Olympiacos goalkeeper José Sá could only parry into the path of Ponce, who gleefully tapped home from close range. Eventually, AEK lost 4–1 against rivals Olympiacos in a derby for UEFA Champions League next season. On 26 February 2019, the prolific Argentinian striker took aim from the edge of the penalty area, thumping a fierce half-volley into the left corner past the despairing dive of Christos Theodorakis and opened the score in a thriumphic 3–0 home Greek Cup game against rivals Atromitos.

On 3 April 2019, he opened the score by finding space between the Lamia's central defenders, as he met Petros Mantalos’ pinpoint cross, confidently heading the ball into the right corner in a 2–0 Greek Cup semifinal 1st leg against Lamia. Boasting 18 goals so far, he became the club's highest goalscorer in one specific season since fellow Argentinian player Ismael Blanco struck an incredible 24 goals for AEK in the 2008–09 season. On 7 April 2019, he scored when as he perfectly brought down Rodrigo Galo’s cross rifling a shot past Živko Živković in a final 3–1 away win game against Xanthi, a result which meant that the team had all but locked up third place in the Super League.

On 25 April 2019, Ponce opened the score as Marko Livaja’s deflected effort struck the right post, but the prolific Argentinian striker was on hand to lash the ensuing rebound into the net in a hammering 4–0 Greek Cup away semi-final second-leg game against Lamia. For the third consecutive year, AEK faced PAOK in the Greek Cup final, but once again fell short, losing 1–0 after Chuba Akpom scored the only goal of the match — marking PAOK's third straight Cup final victory over AEK. On 5 May 2019, in the last matchday of the season, scored in a 3–0 away win against Levadiakos.

=== Spartak Moscow ===
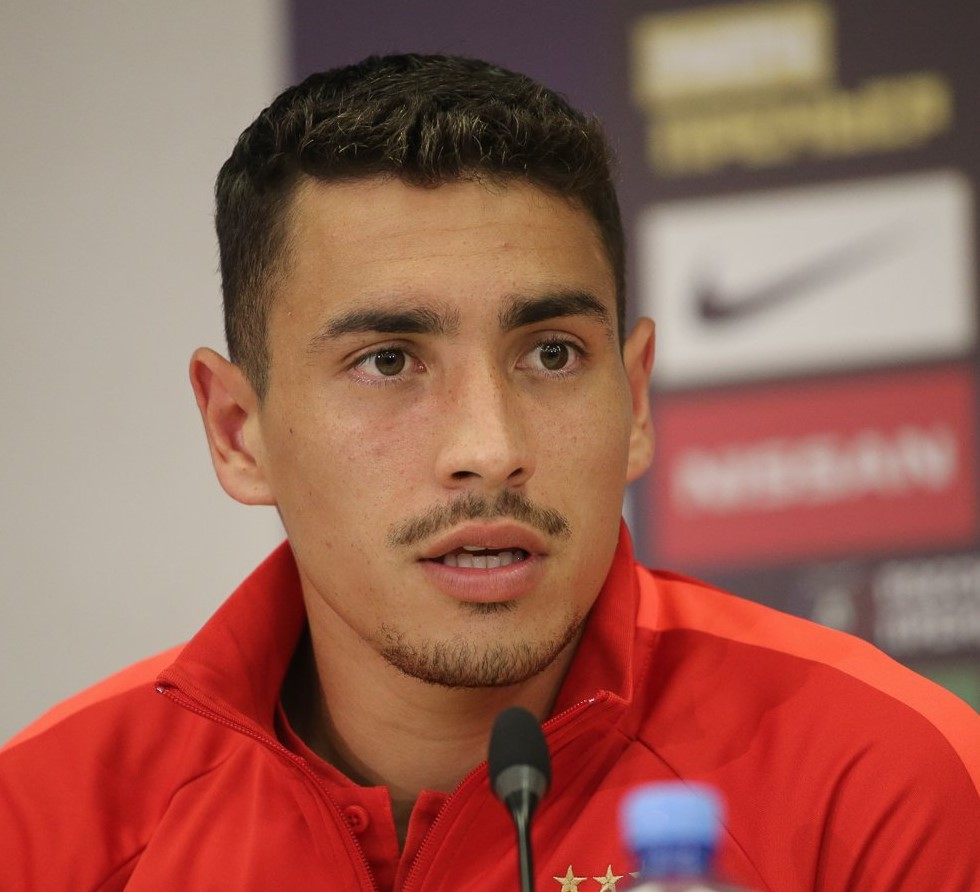
Ponce with Spartak Moscow in 2019.

On 21 June 2019, he signed a long-term contract with the Russian Premier League club Spartak Moscow.

In his fourth game for Spartak, he was sent off in the derby in the first half for striking the goalkeeper of Dynamo Moscow, Anton Shunin, with a straight leg during a cross from his teammate.

=== Elche ===
On 31 January 2022, Ponce returned to Spain after agreeing to a loan deal with Elche CF in the top tier. On 1 June 2022, Elche exercised the purchase option in the loan contract and signed a four-year contract with Ponce.

=== Return to AEK Athens ===
On 5 August 2023, Ponce returned to AEK Athens on a permanent move, signing a four-year contract. He signed for €3,500,000.

=== Houston Dynamo ===
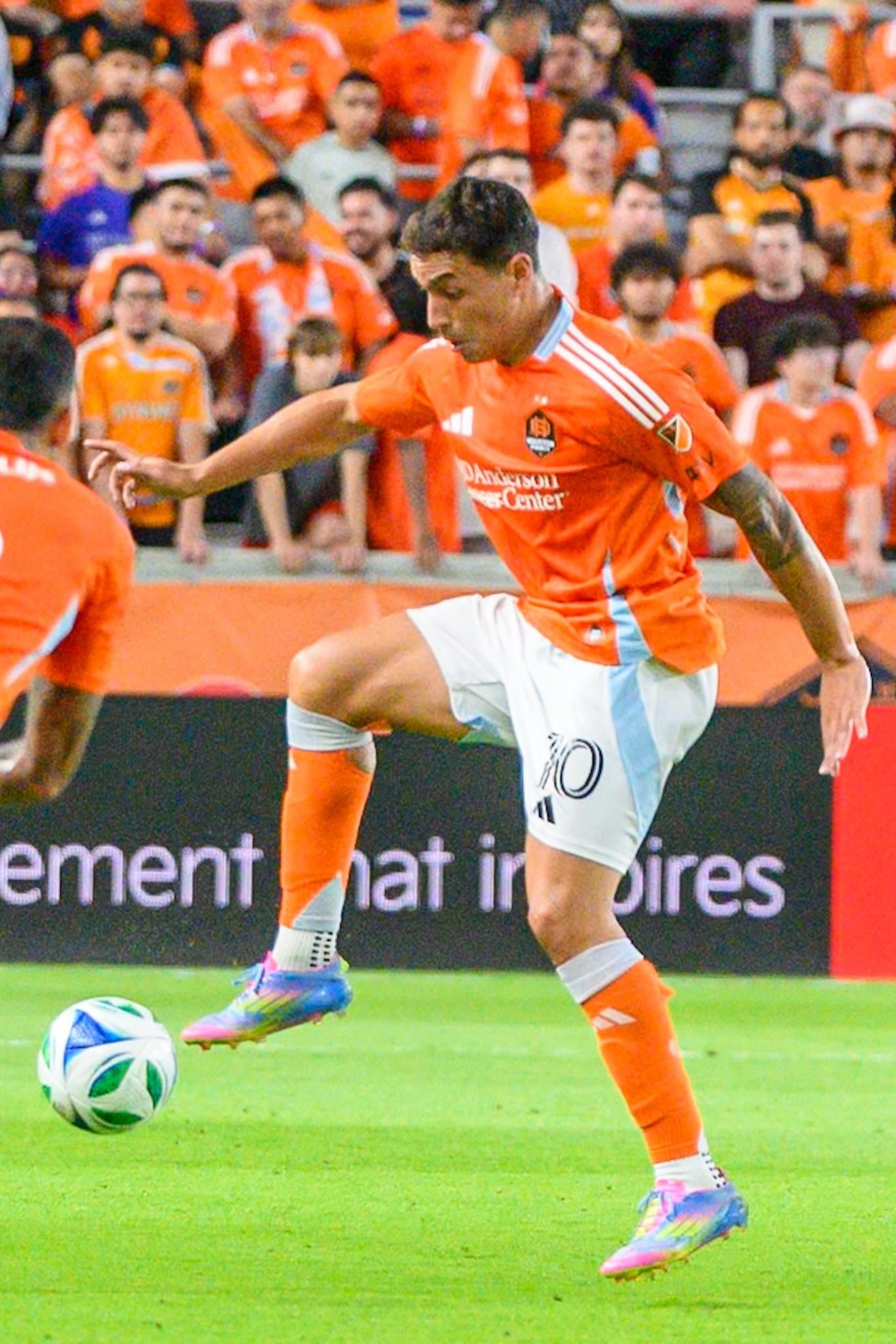
Ponce playing for Houston Dynamo in 2025.

On 17 June 2024, Ponce joined Major League Soccer club Houston Dynamo, becoming the most expensive signing in club history.

=== Elche return ===
On 14 August 2026, Ponce returned to Elche on a one-year contract, with an option for a further two seasons.

== International career ==
He was called up to the 2017 FIFA U-20 World Cup for the summer of 2017. He started for Argentina national under-20 football team in the first match in a 3–0 defeat against England national under-20 football team.

== Personal life ==
He holds Spanish citizenship.

== Career statistics ==
As of match played on 20 March 2026

Appearances and goals by club, season and competition
Club	Season	League			National cup (Note: Includes Copa Argentina, Copa del Rey, Coupe de France, Greek Football Cup, Russian Cup)		League cup (Note: Includes Coupe de la Ligue)		Continental		Total	
Club	Season	Division	Apps	Goals	Apps	Goals	Apps	Goals	Apps	Goals	Apps	Goals
Newell's Old Boys	2013–14	Argentine Primera División	17	4	1	0	—		4 (Note: Appearances in Copa Libertadores)	0	22	4
Newell's Old Boys	2014	Argentine Primera División	1	0	0	0	—		0	0	1	0
Newell's Old Boys	2015	Argentine Primera División	9	1	1	0	—		0	0	10	1
Newell's Old Boys	Total		27	5	2	0	—		4	0	33	5
Roma	2015–16	Serie A	0	0	0	0	—		0	0	0	0
Granada (loan)	2016–17	La Liga	25	2	2	0	—		—		27	2
Lille (loan)	2017–18	Ligue 1	25	2	2	1	2	0	0	0	29	3
AEK Athens (loan)	2018–19	Super League Greece	27	16	7	5	—		9 (Note: Appearances in UEFA Champions League)	0	43	21
Spartak Moscow	2019–20	Russian Premier League	27	6	3	3	—		4 (Note: Appearances in UEFA Europa League)	2	34	11
Spartak Moscow	2020–21	Russian Premier League	25	9	3	1	—		—		28	10
Spartak Moscow	2021–22	Russian Premier League	7	4	0	0	—		4 (Note: Two appearances in UEFA Champions League, two appearances in UEFA Europa League)	0	11	4
Spartak Moscow	Total		59	19	6	4	—		8	2	73	25
Elche (loan)	2021–22	La Liga	13	1	0	0	—		—		13	1
Elche	2022–23	La Liga	34	4	3	2	—		—		22	5
Elche	Total		47	5	3	2	—		—		35	6
AEK Athens	2023–24	Super League Greece	29	15	2	0	—		7 (Note: Five appearance and one goal in UEFA Europa League, two appearances in UEFA Champions League)	1	38	16
Houston Dynamo	2024	Major League Soccer	12	5	0	0	—		3	1	15	6
Houston Dynamo	2025	Major League Soccer	32	10	2	2	—		1	0	35	12
Houston Dynamo	2026	Major League Soccer	2	0	0	0	—		0	0	2	0
Houston Dynamo	Total		46	15	2	2	0	0	4	1	52	18
Career total			285	79	26	14	2	0	32	4	345	97

== Honors ==
Individual

- 2024 MLS Team of the Matchday: Matchday 30
