= Marko Livaja =

Croatian footballer (born 1993)

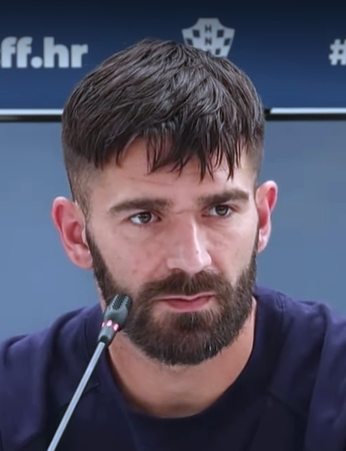
- Livaja in 2022

Personal information
- Full name: Marko Livaja
- Date of birth: 26 August 1993 (age 33)
- Place of birth: Split, Croatia
- Height: 1.79 m (5 ft 10 1/2 in)
- Positions: Forward; attacking midfielder

Team information
- Current team: Hajduk Split
- Number: 10

Youth career
- 1997–2005: GOŠK Kaštel Gomilica
- 2005–2008: Omladinac Vranjic
- 2008–2010: Hajduk Split
- 2010–2011: Inter Milan

Senior career*
Years	Team	Apps	(Gls)
2011–2013	Inter Milan	6	(0)
2011	→ Lugano (loan)	11	(2)
2011–2012	→ Cesena (loan)	3	(0)
2013–2014	Atalanta	31	(4)
2014–2016	Rubin Kazan	11	(0)
2015–2016	→ Empoli (loan)	17	(1)
2016–2018	Las Palmas	25	(5)
2017–2018	→ AEK Athens (loan)	27	(8)
2018–2021	AEK Athens	74	(19)
2021–	Hajduk Split	173	(94)

International career
2008	Croatia U15	4	(4)
2009	Croatia U16	7	(6)
2008–2010	Croatia U17	20	(7)
2010	Croatia U18	4	(1)
2011–2012	Croatia U19	7	(2)
2012–2013	Croatia U20	7	(1)
2013–2014	Croatia U21	5	(3)
2018–2023	Croatia	21	(4)
Medal record
Men's football
Representing Croatia
FIFA World Cup
Third place	2022 Qatar
- * Club domestic league appearances and goals as of 23 August 2026

Marko Livaja (Croatian pronunciation: [mâːrko liʋǎːja, - lǐʋa-]; born 26 August 1993) is a Croatian professional footballer who plays as a forward for Hajduk Split.

Livaja played for the Croatia national team from 2018 to 2023, scoring four goals in 21 matches. He was a part of the squad that won a bronze medal at the 2022 FIFA World Cup in Qatar.

== Club career ==
=== Youth career ===
Livaja began at the lower-tier Croatian side GOŠK Kaštel Gomilica when he was 4 years old, and subsequently NK Omladinac Vranjic before getting a call to the Dinamo Zagreb Academy in the summer of 2008. However, before he was registered for Dinamo he received a call from Hajduk Split Academy, long-standing rivals of Dinamo, and moved there. At the beginning of 2010, he was promoted to the full Hajduk team.

=== Inter Milan ===
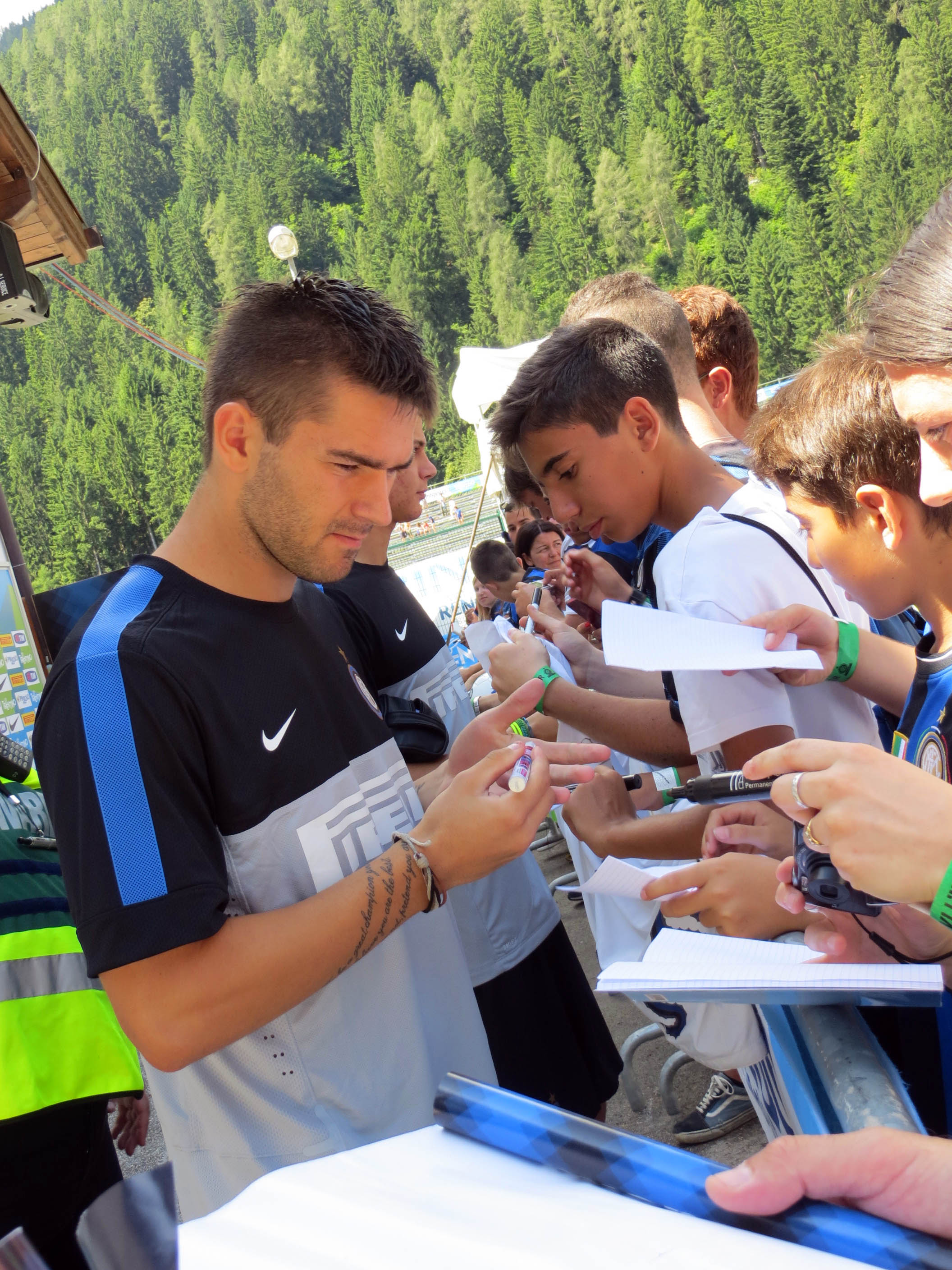
Livaja in 2012

Later in 2010 (after joining the full Hajduk team) Livaja was sold to Internazionale, who loaned him to Swiss side FC Lugano in 2011. He was loaned again to Cesena in summer 2011 through a €250,000 deal from Hajduk Split, and made his Serie A debut for Cesena against Fiorentina in October 2011. Livaja played for Cesena in both their primary team and their youth team.

In January 2012 he returned to Inter when Cesena partially sold him to them for 11 million in a co-ownership deal. After Andrea Stramaccioni was appointed the coach of the first team, Livaja became a member of Inter Primavera, winning the 2011–12 NextGen series. Livaja received his first call-up as a member of the first team on 1 April 2012, where he was an unused substitute in a match against Genoa won 5–4 at San Siro.

In the 2012–13 season, Livaja made his first appearance in the opening season match against Pescara and played his first game as a team starter against Roma in January 2013. He appeared in a total of six Serie A games during the first half of the season, but without scoring a goal. Livaja got more playing time in European games, as he was the coach Stramaccioni's first choice striker for 2012–13 UEFA Europa League group matches against Rubin Kazan, FK Partizan, and Neftchi Baku.

He scored his first goal for Inter against Rubin Kazan on 20 September 2012 and became Inter's top scorer for the group stage, with four goals in six group matches. Inter finished second in Group H with 11 points, three behind Rubin Kazan.

=== Atalanta ===
On 31 January 2013 Livaja was loaned to Atalanta, though Inter retained half his registration rights. Inter paid €1.5 million to acquire Livaja outright from Cesena but resold half his rights to Atalanta for €2.5M as part of Ezequiel Schelotto's deal for €6M. Livaja made his debut for the new club against Catania Calcio on 10 February 2013 and scored his first two goals for them on Matchday 26 against A.S. Roma.

For disciplinary reasons, he remained off the squad list in April during Atalanta's match against Sampdoria. He played his first game against his owners Inter Milan on 7 April 2013, coming on as a second-half substitute. In April, Livaja was given Atalanta's "Man of the Month" award for February 2013 by the club fans. On 7 May, before the match with Juventus, Livaja was once again expelled from the squad due to a breach of discipline.

=== Rubin Kazan ===
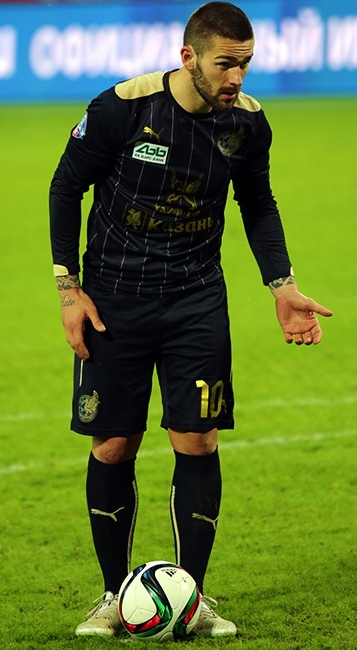
Livaja with Rubin Kazan

Livaja signed with Rubin Kazan on 15 May 2014 on a five-year deal. The Russian league club paid up to €6M for him. Due to his erratic behaviour on 31 August 2015, Rubin Kazan send him on loan at Serie A side Empoli. His spell didn't go as expected, with Livaja scoring only once in 18 matches for Azzurri, only four as starter. That goal came on 22 November during the 2–2 away draw against Fiorentina.

=== Las Palmas ===
On 14 July 2016, Livaja joined La Liga side Las Palmas by signing a contract until June 2020. He made his debut later on 22 August, a debut which brought his first goals as well, as Las Palmas defeated Valencia 4–2 at Mestalla Stadium. Then, he endured a 613-minute scoreless run across 10 matches until 4 December 2016, when he scored he's team's only goal in the 1–1 away draw against Deportivo Alavés. Livaja made his first Copa del Rey appearance on 10 January of the following year in the returning leg of round of 16 against Atlético Madrid, scoring a brace in a 2–3 away win but 4–3 aggregate loss.

==== Loan to AEK Athens ====
===== 2017–18 season =====
On 1 July 2017, after disciplinary problems, Livaja was loaned to AEK Athens, for an initial loan fee of €200,000 with a purchase option of €1.8 million for the summer of 2018. He made his debut on 25 July 2017 in a 2–0 home defeat against CSKA Moscow in the first leg of the Champions League third qualifying round. On 28 September 2017, he scored a 90th-minute equaliser for AEK, his second in a game that ends 2–2 against Austria Wien in the UEFA Europa League group stage. On 5 November 2017 he scored the only goal in the "double-headed eagle" derby against PAOK. On 19 November 2017, Livaja stole a point for AEK in an away 1–1 derby against rivals Panathinaikos with a dramatic equalizer at the last moment of the game. On 27 November 2017, he scored a brace in a 3–0 home win against Platanias, which brought his team back to the top of the league table. On 3 December 2017, with his second-half goal, AEK won 2–0 in an away clash against Levadiakos remaining on top of the 2017–18 Super League after 13 matches.

On 14 January 2018, he opened the score in a 3–1 home win game against PAS Giannina. On 27 January he scored in a 2–0 home win game against Lamia. On 4 March 2018, he scored with a head in a brilliant right-wing cross from Rodrigo Galo, sealing a 1–0 home win against rivals Panionios. In his first season with AEK Athens he won the Super League, but lost the Greek Cup to PAOK, managing to reach the Round of 32 of the Europa League, where they were eliminated by Dynamo Kyiv.

=== AEK Athens ===
==== 2018–19 season ====
On 22 March 2018, impressed by his performances, AEK decided to trigger his optional transfer clause of €1.8 million and the player will reportedly earn €700,000 per year until the summer of 2021. On 14 August 2018, he headed into the net from close range to make it 2–0, and despite Scott Sinclair bringing Celtic back into the contest in the latter stages, AEK held on for dear life to earn progression to the UEFA Champions League playoffs to play Vidi in a 2–1 home win game against Celtic in the Champions League Third qualifying round, 2nd leg. Two days later an unnamed Italian team, later proved to be Sampdoria, offered €8 million for the Croatian forward, but the administration of the team turned it down. On 25 August 2018, he scored his first goal of the 2018–19 season in a 2–0 home win game against PAS Giannina as he was in the right place at the right time to convert a superb cross from right-back Michalis Bakakis after some neat approach play from Rodrigo Galo. On 20 October 2018, some excellent build-up play from forward Viktor Klonaridis allowed Livaja to score his first league goal since the opening match of the season, in a 2–0 away win against Apollon Smyrnis. A week later, he chipped in to put further gloss on the scoreline by converting a Lucas Boyé cross, added a fourth for Marinos Ouzounidis’ team in a hammering 4–0 home win game against Aris. On 2 December 2018, he came in as a substitute and scored with a wonderful solo in a 2–0 home win against Xanthi. Οn 20 December 2018, he scored a brace in a 3–1 away win against Volos in the final game of the 2018–19 Greek Cup group stage.

On 20 January 2019, he opened the score in a comfortable 3–0 home win game against Asteras Tripolis. Three days later, he came in as a substitute and scored a brace in an emphatic 5–0 home win against AO Chania−Kissamikos in the Greek Cup round of 16. His team won 6–1 on aggregate and advanced to the quarter finals of the competition. On 10 February 2019, he scored the only goal in a 1–0 home win against OFI, after a fine solo effort from Christos Albanis.

On 5 May 2019, the last matchday of the season, he scored in a 3–0 away win against Levadiakos.

==== 2019–20 season ====
He contributed a goal and an assist as AEK beat Universitatea Craiova to reach the 2019–20 Europa League play-off round, but despite his goal in that round against Trabzonspor, the tie ended 3–3 on aggregate and AEK were eliminated on away goals. On 1 September 2019 he scored his first league goal of the season in a 2–3 away win against Asteras Tripolis, after an assist from Christos Albanis. On 21 September, Livaja continued his excellent form by scoring in a 1–0 away win against Panetolikos, which was the third consecutive. On 20 October 2019, Livaja scored with a kick in a 3–2 home win game against Volos. On 18 December, Livaja helped AEK sealing a vital 2–1 home win game against Asteras Tripolis, when 45 seconds into the second half a slick passing move involving Nenad Krstičić and Paulinho was finished off with a one-touch finish by the Croatian international. On 5 January 2020, Livaja was in excellent form as he netted two goals (one from the penalty spot) and won a penalty to lead AEK to 3–1 home victory over struggling Panetolikos. He was named as the Man of the match. On 19 February, he scored with a late penalty in a 4–0 home win against Panetolikos for the Greek Cup quarter finals.

On 7 June, after an 80-day enforced COVID-19 break, Livaja picked up possession under close attention from Mattias Johansson, and he skillfully turned his man before beating Sokratis Dioudis with a powerful shot to equalize the score in a 1–1 home draw game against Panathinaikos for the 2019–20 Super League play-offs. On 14 June 2020, he scored with a close header, after an excellent cross from Hélder Lopes, helping to a 2–0 away win against OFI.

On 24 June, Livaja scored a brace and led his team to the cup final for the fifth consecutive year, after a dramatic 2–2 away draw against Aris at extra time. Also in June, Livaja was named as the Player of the Season in the Greek Super League.

On 1 July, AEK's were awarded a penalty when Giannis Michailidis fouled AEK's Italian forward Daniele Verde in the PAOK box, and Livaja's excellent kick sealing a vital 2–0 away Playoffs win against rivals PAOK.

==== 2020–21 season ====
On 19 August 2020, AEK rejected a €4,000,000 offer from Al Wahda, setting a price tag of €8,000,000. Rennes and Saint-Étienne, both of Ligue 1, also expressed interest in signing the player. On 19 September 2020, in the 2020–21 Super League Greece opener, Livaja scored sealing a 2–0 away win against Panetolikos. On 5 November 2020, he scored a brace and gave an assist in a 4–1 away win 2020–21 UEFA Europa League group stage game against FC Zorya Luhansk helping AEK to increase the possibility of qualifying for the next phase of the UEFA Europa League. On 29 November 2020, he opened the score in a 2–1 away win against Asteras Tripolis.

On 17 January 2021, he scored with a header helping to a 2–1 home win against Atromitos.

On 17 February 2021, Livaja was released from his AEK contract upon request, after being deemed surplus to requirements due to his refusal to sign a contract extension.

=== Hajduk Split ===
On the same day his AEK contract was terminated, Livaja joined Croatian club Hajduk Split until the end of the season. He managed seven goals and eight assists in his 17 appearances for Hajduk, helping the club qualify for the 2021–22 UEFA Europa Conference League qualifying stages.

On 9 June 2021, Hajduk announced that Livaja signed a new contract with the club until the summer of 2024. On 21 December 2021, Prva HNL team captains named Marko Livaja as the Best Footballer in the league. The Hajduk striker is the first from the Split club to win the best player award since 2003. Livaja finished the 2021–22 Prva HNL season as top goalscorer with 28 goals, ahead of Rijeka's Josip Drmić with 21. His 28 league goals is a Hajduk record for a single season, beating Leo Lemešić's tally of 26 in 1934–35 and Zlatko Vujović with 25. In July 2022, Livaja extended his contract for 4 more years.

Livaja was awarded the Prva HNL Player of the Year (Tportal) award for 2022. In doing so, he became the first player to win the award in consecutive years and first since Sammir in 2012 to be a repeat winner. For the 2022–23 Croatian Football League season, Livaja was again the top goalscorer in the league with 19 goals, as Hajduk finished runners-up in the competition. The last match of the league season was also his 100th for Hajduk in all competitions. Livaja scored a late penalty in the 2023 Croatian Football Cup final, as Hajduk defended its title from the previous year, winning its eighth Croatian Cup. In July 2022, Livaja was again voted as the best player in the HNL, winning the award for the 2022/23 season.

Marko Livaja was selected as the best player in the HNL for a record third time in January 2025, with Bruno Petković in second place. At the end of season awards night, Livaja picked up three individual honours, including Best Player of the Season, Top Scorer, and Best Goal of the Season.

== International career ==
On 20 August 2018, as a result of his exceptional performances with AEK Athens, Croatia coach Zlatko Dalić included the uncapped Livaja in his squad for the friendly versus Portugal (1–1 draw), and the Nations League clash against Spain, which ended up as Croatia's biggest defeat in history.

On 17 May 2021, Livaja was named in the preliminary 34-man squad for the UEFA Euro 2020, but did not make the final 26. After three years of absence, he was recalled by Dalić for 2022 FIFA World Cup qualifying matches in September 2021. He scored his first international goal on 7 September against Slovenia, giving the lead in an eventual 3–0 victory.

On 31 October 2022, Livaja was named in Croatia's final 26-man squad for the 2022 FIFA World Cup in Qatar. On 27 November 2022, Livaja scored his first goal for Croatia at a major tournament in a 4–1 victory over Canada, becoming the first ever current Hajduk Split player to score for Croatia at a FIFA World Cup in the process. On 17 December, in the third place play-off against Morocco, Livaja provided Mislav Oršić with an assist for the winning goal, as Croatia won 2–1 and claimed their second bronze and third overall World Cup medal in history.

On 5 June 2023, Livaja was named in Dalić's final 23-man squad for the 2023 UEFA Nations League Finals; on the same day, during Croatia's open training at the Rujevica Stadium, he confronted a group of spectators who were hurling insults at him. The next day, Livaja voluntarily withdrew from the squad. On 25 September, Livaja earned a call-up back to the national team ahead of the October Euro 2024 qualifiers against Turkey and Wales. After Armada Rijeka made stickers staying "Die, Livaja" ahead of the Adriatic derby, Livaja decided to retire from the national team permanently on 8 October. Writing for The Guardian, Croatian journalist Aleksandar Holiga claimed that Livaja's decision had been influenced by Dalić's "failure to back him".

== Career statistics ==
=== Club ===
As of match played 30 July 2026

Appearances and goals by club, season and competition
Club	Season	League			National cup (Note: Includes Coppa Italia, Russian Cup, Copa del Rey, Greek Cup, Croatian Cup)		Europe		Other		Total	
Club	Season	Division	Apps	Goals	Apps	Goals	Apps	Goals	Apps	Goals	Apps	Goals
Cesena (loan)	2011–12	Serie A	3	0	0	0	—		—		3	0
Inter Milan	2012–13	Serie A	6	0	0	0	7 (Note: Appearances in UEFA Europa League)	4	—		13	4
Atalanta	2012–13	Serie A	11	2	0	0	—		—		11	2
Atalanta	2013–14	Serie A	20	2	3	2	—		—		23	4
Atalanta	Total		31	4	3	2	—		—		34	6
Rubin Kazan	2014–15	Russian Premier League	11	0	2	1	—		—		13	1
Empoli (loan)	2015–16	Serie A	17	1	0	0	—		—		17	1
Las Palmas	2016–17	La Liga	25	5	1	2	—		—		26	7
AEK Athens (loan)	2017–18	Super League Greece	27	8	5	0	10 (Note: Two appearances in UEFA Champions League, eight appearances and two goals in UEFA Europa League)	2	—		42	10
AEK Athens	2018–19	Super League Greece	25	7	8	4	5 (Note: Appearances in UEFA Champions League)	1	—		38	12
AEK Athens	2019–20	Super League Greece	32	9	6	3	4	3	—		42	15
AEK Athens	2020–21	Super League Greece	17	3	1	0	7	2	—		25	5
AEK Athens	AEK total		101	27	20	7	26	8	—		147	42
Hajduk Split	2020–21	Prva HNL	15	6	2	1	—		—		17	7
Hajduk Split	2021–22	Prva HNL	34	28	5	4	1 (Note: Appearance(s) in UEFA Europa Conference League)	0	—		40	32
Hajduk Split	2022–23	HNL	34	19	4	2	4	0	1 (Note: Appearance in Croatian Super Cup)	0	43	21
Hajduk Split	2023–24	HNL	25	10	3	2	2	0	0	0	30	12
Hajduk Split	2024–25	HNL	35	19	1	1	4 (Note: Appearances in UEFA Conference League)	1	—		40	21
Hajduk Split	2025–26	HNL	26	9	2	2	4	0	—		32	11
Hajduk Split	2026–27	HNL	3	2	0	0	6	0	—		9	2
Hajduk Split	Total		172	93	17	12	21	1	1	0	211	106
Career total			356	122	42	24	52	13	1	0	451	159

=== International ===
As of match played 25 March 2023

Appearances and goals by national team and year
National team	Year	Apps	Goals
Croatia	2018	4	0
Croatia	2019	0	0
Croatia	2020	0	0
Croatia	2021	7	2
Croatia	2022	9	2
Croatia	2023	1	0
Total		21	4

Croatia score listed first, score column indicates score after each Livaja goal.

List of international goals scored by Marko Livaja
No.	Date	Venue	Opponent	Score	Result	Competition
1	7 September 2021	Stadion Poljud, Split, Croatia	Slovenia	1–0	3–0	2022 FIFA World Cup qualification
2	8 October 2021	AEK Arena – Georgios Karapatakis, Larnaca, Cyprus	Cyprus	3–0	3–0	2022 FIFA World Cup qualification
3	25 September 2022	Ernst-Happel-Stadion, Vienna, Austria	Austria	2–1	3–1	2022–23 UEFA Nations League A
4	27 November 2022	Khalifa International Stadium, Al Rayyan, Qatar	Canada	2–1	4–1	2022 FIFA World Cup

== Honours ==
AEK Athens

- Super League Greece: 2017–18

Hajduk Split

- Croatian Cup: 2021–22, 2022–23

Croatia

- FIFA World Cup third place: 2022

Individual

- Super League Greece Player of the Season: 2019–20
- Super League Greece Team of the Season: 2017–18, 2019–20
- AEK Athens Player of the Season: 2019–20
- Croatian First Football League Player of the Year: 2021–22, 2022–23
- Croatian First Football League Top scorer: 2021–22, 2022–23
- Croatian First Football League Team of the Year: 2021–22, 2022–23
- Croatian First Football League top assist provider: 2022–23
