= Paris Babis =

Greek footballer (born 1999)

Personal information
- Date of birth: 17 July 1999 (age 27)
- Place of birth: Athens, Greece
- Height: 1.74 m (5 ft 9 in)
- Position: Midfielder

Team information
- Current team: Hellas Syros
- Number: 29

Youth career
- 2011–2013: Anagennisi Petroupoli
- 2013–2017: AEK Athens

Senior career*
Years	Team	Apps	(Gls)
2017–2022	AEK Athens	0	(0)
2019	→ Apollon Pontus (loan)	9	(0)
2019–2020	→ Kalamata (loan)	14	(0)
2020	→ Platanias (loan)	5	(0)
2020–2021	→ Apollon Larissa (loan)	23	(1)
2021–2022	AEK Athens B	25	(1)
2022–2023	Lamia	5	(0)
2023	Athens Kallithea	12	(0)
2023–2025	Egaleo	43	(5)
2025–	Hellas Syros	19	(2)
- * Club domestic league appearances and goals as of 19 September 2026

Paris Babis (Greek: Πάρης Μπάμπης; born 17 July 1999) is a Greek professional footballer who plays as a midfielder for Super League 2 club Hellas Syros.

== Career ==
=== AEK Athens ===
On 21 August 2017, Babis signed a professional contract with AEK Athens.

On 31 October 2018, Babis made his debut in Greek Cup in a 4–0 away win game against Apollon Larissa.

==== Loan moves ====
On 28 January 2019, Babis was loaned to Apollon Pontus.

On 7 September 2019, Babis signed with Football League club Kalamata.

On 31 January 2020, Babis moved to Super League 2 club Platanias.

On 6 October 2020, he was loaned to Apollon Larissa.

== Career statistics ==
As of 12 August 2022

Club	Season	League			Cup		Continental		Other		Total	
Club	Season	Division	Apps	Goals	Apps	Goals	Apps	Goals	Apps	Goals	Apps	Goals
AEK Athens	2018–19	Super League Greece	0	0	2	0	—		—		2	0
Apollon Pontus (loan)	2018–19	Super League Greece 2	9	0	—		—		—		9	0
Kalamata (loan)	2019–20	Football League	14	0	3	0	—		—		17	0
Platanias (loan)	2019–20	Super League Greece 2	5	0	—		—		—		5	0
Apollon Larissa (loan)	2020–21	Super League Greece 2	23	1	—		—		—		23	1
AEK Athens B	2021–22	Super League Greece 2	25	1	—		—		—		25	1
Career total			76	2	5	0	0	0	0	0	81	2

== Honours ==
AEK Athens

- Super League Greece: 2017–18
