= Nenad Krstičić =

Serbian footballer (born 1990)

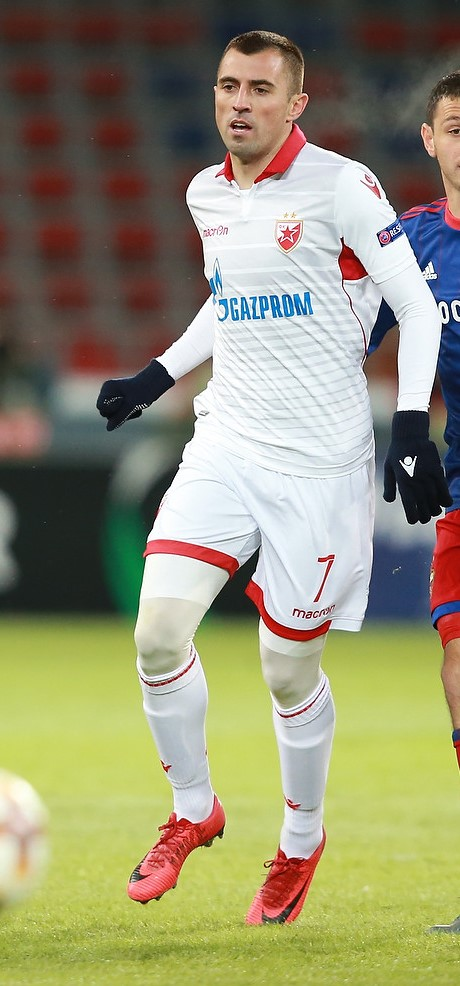
- Krstičić with Red Star Belgrade in 2018

Personal information
- Full name: Nenad Krstičić
- Date of birth: 3 July 1990 (age 36)
- Place of birth: Belgrade, SFR Yugoslavia
- Height: 1.82 m (6 ft 0 in)
- Position: Midfielder

Senior career*
| Years | Team | Apps | (Gls) |
| 2007–2008 | OFK Beograd | 29 | (2) |
| 2008–2016 | Sampdoria | 92 | (2) |
| 2015 | → Bologna (loan) | 16 | (0) |
| 2016–2017 | Alavés | 20 | (3) |
| 2017–2019 | Red Star Belgrade | 40 | (5) |
| 2019–2021 | AEK Athens | 68 | (2) |
| 2021–2023 | Red Star Belgrade | 34 | (2) |

International career^{‡}
| 2008–2012 | Serbia U21 | 6 | (0) |
| 2013–2017 | Serbia | 4 | (0) |
- * Club domestic league appearances and goals as of 28 May 2023 ‡ National team caps and goals as of 14:25, 10 November 2017 (UTC)

Nenad Krstičić (born 3 July 1990) is a Serbian retired professional footballer who played as a midfielder. He debuted for the Serbia national team in 2013.

== Club career ==
=== Early career and cancer diagnosis ===
Krstičić began his career at OFK Beograd and joined Sampdoria on 1 September 2008 at the insisting of Giuseppe Marotta, who believed the 17-year-old was one of the most talented players he had ever brought to the club. While playing for the youth team, he played in the 2011 Torneo di Viareggio as one of the allowed over-age players. He suffered a knee injury and had surgery performed to correct his meniscus injury, after which doctors unexpectedly diagnosed him with Burkitt's lymphoma and allegedly told Krstičić he had 48 hours to live. Luckily, Sampdoria's medical staff was able to reverse the cancer growth and Krstičić lived on to play football, although the condition was a great setback in his career. Over the course of his cancer episode, Krstičić lost 55 pounds and his blood was compromised. Krstičić finally made his debut for Sampdoria in a UEFA Europa League match against Debrecen on 16 December 2010. On 2 December 2012, he scored his first goal for Sampdoria against Fiorentina.

On 2 February 2015, Krstičić was signed by Bologna in a temporary deal. The club also signed Júnior Costa and Daniele Gastaldello from the Genoese club outright. However, Krstičić was injured in March. His contract with Sampdoria was terminated on 18 July 2016.

=== Alavés ===
On 25 July 2016, Krstičić signed for La Liga side Alavés on a free transfer. Fellow countryman Aleksandar Katai, who also suffered from a serious illness earlier in his career, joined Alavés later the same summer, and the two became midfield teammates.

=== Red Star Belgrade ===
On 23 August 2017, Krstičić joined Red Star Belgrade on a two-year deal. He made his debut in the eternal derby on 27 August 2017. Krstičić adapted as a central midfielder during the 2017–18 season under coach Vladan Milojević, usually pairing with defensive midfielder Mitchell Donald after Branko Jovičić's injury. After Guélor Kanga left Red Star, Krstičić began playing offensive role in early 2018. He scored his first goal for the club in 2–1 victory over Voždovac on 3 March 2018. Eight days later, Krstičić also scored in 1–1 draw to Napredak Kruševac.

=== AEK Athens ===
On 26 December 2018, Red Star Belgrade announced that Krstičić's transfer to AEK Athens had gone through. The Athens based club activated his release clause of €500,000, six months before the end of his contract with Red Star, which saw him move to his new club.

On 23 January 2019, he scored his first goal for his new club in an emphatic 5–0 home win against AO Chania Kissamikos for the Greek Cup round of 16. His team won 6–1 on aggregate and advanced to the quarter finals of the competition. On 3 April 2019, by lashing the ball across from the right wing, Victor Klonaridis picked out the onrushing Krstičić, who prodded it past the beaten Nikos Melissas in a 2–0 Greek Cup semifinal 1st leg against Lamia.

On 2 February 2020, AEK Athens escaped from Peristeri Stadium with all three points thanks to Nenad Krstičić header, whose solitary goal gave Massimo Carrera’s side a narrow 1–0 win over Atromitos. It was his first goal for the Super League. On 19 February 2020, he scored with a close tap-in in a 4–0 home win against Panetolikos for the Greek Cup quarter finals.

On 27 September 2020, he scored with an exquisite shot outside the box, helping to a 3–0 home win against Lamia.

=== Return to Red Star Belgrade ===
On 1 July 2021, Krstičić signed a three-year contract with Red Star Belgrade.

== International career ==
Krstičić made his debut for Serbia on 6 February 2013 in a friendly match against Cyprus at age 22. He earned a total of 4 caps (no goals) and his final international was a November 2017 friendly match away against China.

== Career statistics ==
=== Club ===
As of match played 1 June 2023

| Club | Season | League | | | National cup (Note: Includes Serbian Cup, Coppa Italia, Copa del Rey, Greek Cup) | | Europe | | Total | |
| Club | Season | Division | Apps | Goals | Apps | Goals | Apps | Goals | Apps | Goals |
|---|---|---|---|---|---|---|---|---|---|---|
| OFK Beograd | 2007–08 | Serbian SuperLiga | 24 | 0 | | | — | | 24 | 2 |
| OFK Beograd | 2008–09 | Serbian SuperLiga | 3 | 0 | | | 2 (Note: Appearances in UEFA Cup) | 0 | 5 | 0 |
| OFK Beograd | Total | | 27 | 2 | | | 2 | 0 | 29 | 2 |
| Sampdoria | 2009–10 | Serie A | 0 | 0 | 0 | 0 | — | | 0 | 0 |
| Sampdoria | 2010–11 | Serie A | 0 | 0 | 0 | 0 | 1 | 0 | 1 | 0 |
| Sampdoria | 2011–12 | Serie B | 13 | 0 | 0 | 0 | — | | 13 | 0 |
| Sampdoria | 2012–13 | Serie A | 25 | 1 | 1 | 0 | — | | 26 | 1 |
| Sampdoria | 2013–14 | Serie A | 32 | 1 | 2 | 1 | — | | 34 | 2 |
| Sampdoria | 2014–15 | Serie A | 12 | 0 | 3 | 0 | — | | 15 | 0 |
| Sampdoria | 2015–16 | Serie A | 10 | 0 | 0 | 0 | 2 (Note: Appearances in UEFA Europa League) | 0 | 12 | 0 |
| Sampdoria | Total | | 92 | 2 | 6 | 1 | 3 | 0 | 101 | 3 |
| Bologna (loan) | 2014–15 | Serie B | 16 | 0 | 0 | 0 | — | | 16 | 0 |
| Alavés | 2016–17 | La Liga | 14 | 2 | 6 | 1 | — | | 20 | 3 |
| Red Star | 2017–18 | Serbian SuperLiga | 27 | 4 | 1 | 0 | 8 | 0 | 36 | 4 |
| Red Star | 2018–19 | Serbian SuperLiga | 13 | 1 | 1 | 0 | 13 (Note: Appearances in UEFA Champions League) | 1 | 27 | 2 |
| Red Star | Total | | 40 | 5 | 2 | 0 | 21 | 1 | 63 | 6 |
| AEK Athens | 2018–19 | Super League Greece | 13 | 0 | 5 | 2 | — | | 18 | 2 |
| AEK Athens | 2019–20 | Super League Greece | 30 | 1 | 6 | 1 | 4 | 0 | 40 | 2 |
| AEK Athens | 2020–21 | Super League Greece | 25 | 1 | 4 | 0 | 7 | 0 | 36 | 1 |
| AEK Athens | Total | | 68 | 2 | 15 | 3 | 11 | 0 | 94 | 5 |
| Red Star | 2021–22 | Serbian SuperLiga | 30 | 2 | 3 | 0 | 11 (Note: Four appearances in UEFA Champions League, seven appearances in UEFA Europa League) | 0 | 44 | 2 |
| Red Star | 2022–23 | Serbian SuperLiga | 4 | 0 | 1 | 0 | 0 | 0 | 5 | 0 |
| Red Star | Total | | 34 | 2 | 4 | 0 | 11 | 0 | 49 | 2 |
| Career total | | | 292 | 15 | 33 | 5 | 48 | 1 | 372 | 21 |

=== International ===
As of 10 November 2017

Serbia
| Year | Apps | Goals |
| 2013 | 3 | 0 |
| 2014 | 0 | 0 |
| 2015 | 0 | 0 |
| 2016 | 0 | 0 |
| 2017 | 1 | 0 |
| Total | 4 | 0 |

== Honours ==
=== Club ===
Red Star Belgrade

- Serbian SuperLiga: 2017–18, 2018–19, 2021–22, 2022–23
- Serbian Cup: 2021–22, 2022–23

=== Individual ===
- Serbian SuperLiga Team of the Season: 2017–18
