= Alef (footballer, born 1995) =

Brazilian footballer

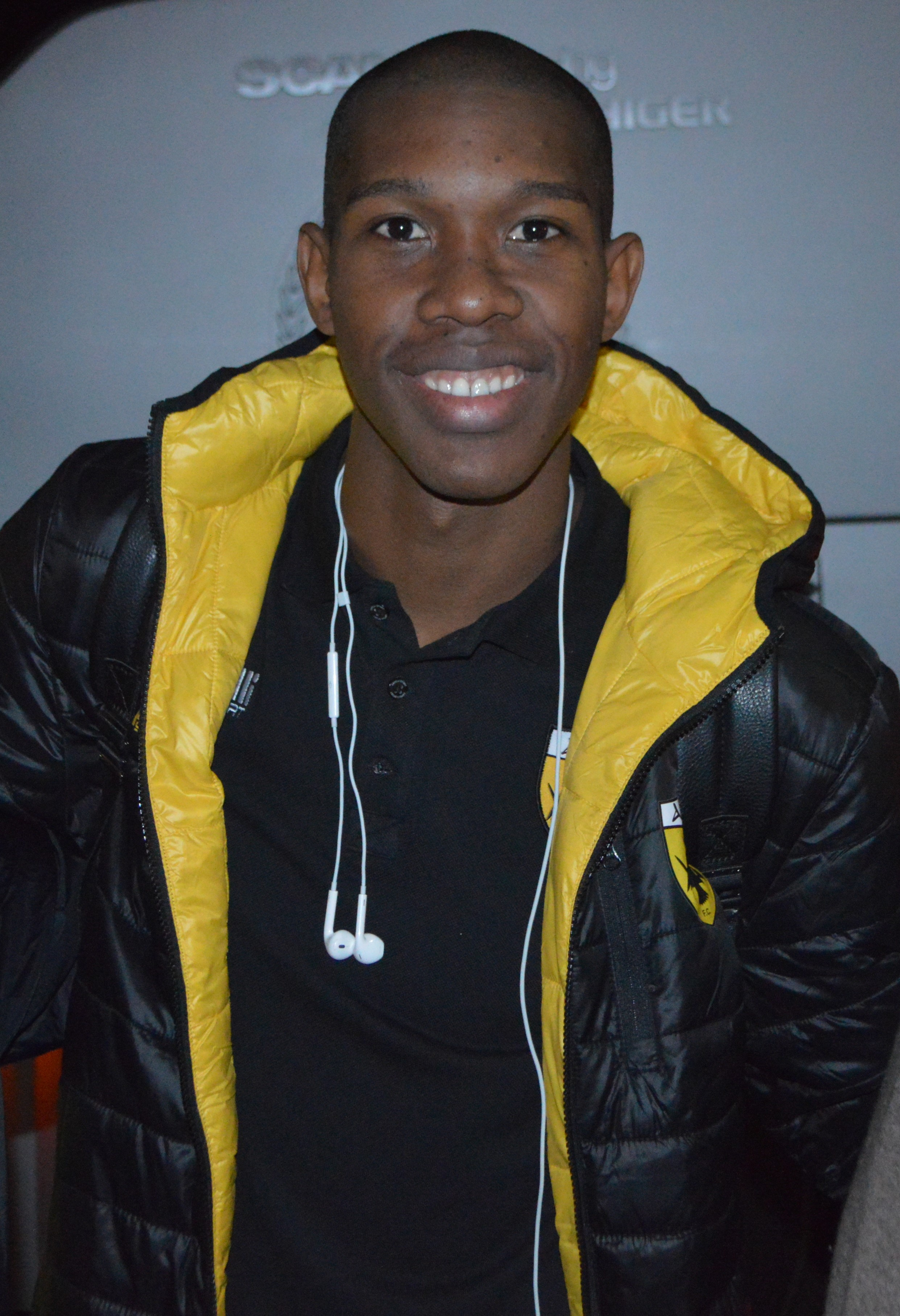
- Alef (AEK Athens, 2018)

Personal information
- Full name: Alef dos Santos Saldanha
- Date of birth: 28 January 1995 (age 31)
- Place of birth: Nova Odessa, Brazil
- Height: 1.86 m (6 ft 1 in)
- Position: Midfielder

Team information
- Current team: São Bernardo

Senior career*
Years	Team	Apps	(Gls)
2013–2015	Ponte Preta	19	(0)
2014–2015	→ Marseille B (loan)	8	(0)
2015–2020	Braga	7	(0)
2016–2017	→ Umm Salal (loan)	17	(1)
2017–2018	→ Apollon Limassol (loan)	28	(1)
2018–2019	→ AEK Athens (loan)	22	(1)
2019–2020	→ APOEL (loan)	17	(0)
2020–2023	Fehérvár	39	(2)
2023–	São Bernardo	0	(0)

International career
2015	Brazil U20	2	(0)
- * Club domestic league appearances and goals as of 11 March 2023

Alef dos Santos Saldanha (born 28 January 1995) is a Brazilian professional footballer who plays as a midfielder for São Bernardo Futebol Clube in Brazil

== Club career ==
=== Early career ===
Starting his career with Ponte Preta in 2013, he joined Marseille B on a year-long loan with an option to buy.

=== Braga ===
In July 2015, Alef signed a contract with Braga, valid for the next five seasons.

==== Umm Salal SC (loan) ====
On 2 September 2016, QSL club Umm Salal has announced the signing of midfielder Alef from Portuguese club Braga. The player put pen to paper on a one-year loan deal. The signing of the 21 year old Brazilian, completes the Orange Fortresses quartet of professionals ahead of the new QSL season. Alef joins up with compatriot Anderson Martins.

==== Apollon Limassol (loan) ====
On 5 July 2017 he joined Apollon Limassol of the Cypriot First Division on a season-long loan. In Cyprus, the Brazilian midfielder reminds the player who stood out in the FIFA U-20 World Cup in New Zealand. By keeping the ball properly, hindering the attacks of the opponents, changing the game well and circling the ball from either the left or the right side. At the same time he demonstrates that he has a very good technical training, having overall a leading role in the middle line of Apollon Limassol throughout the year.

==== AEK Athens (loan) ====
On 14 July 2018, AEK Athens and Braga agreed terms for the loan move of Alef to the Greek champions, until the summer of 2019. Under contract at Braga, the 23-year old defensive midfielder spent the last season as a loanee in Cyprus, impressing with runners-up Apollon Limassol. Despite his strong performances with Apollon Limassol, Alef is surplus to requirements at Braga and AEK decided to pounce. According to reports, the reigning Greek champions have struck a deal with Braga, agreeing to sign Alef on loan for the upcoming season with the player holding a release clause of €2 million which can be activated next year. On 20 January 2019, Alef netted with a tap in following Dmytro Chyhrynskyi's headed pass in a comfortable 3–0 home win game against Asteras Tripolis. It was his first goal in the league.

==== APOEL (loan) ====
On 26 June 2019, Brazilian defensive midfielder Alef, who spent the 2018-19 season on loan at AEK from SC Braga, has joined Cypriot champions APOEL. Reigning Cypriot champions APOEL released this announcement: “APOEL Football Club announces the agreement with Sporting Clube de Braga for the one-year loan of Alef dos Santos Saldanha with a purchase option. The footballer chose the number 95.” In AEK, Alef played in 36 games for AEK, registering the two goals. This summer, AEK had the opportunity to sign him on a permanent basis from Braga, but the club decided to let the 24-year-old go and APOEL subsequently pounced. This will be the second time when Alef has played in Cyprus. Back in the 2017-18 season, Alef played on loan at Apollon Limassol, competing in 36 matches for the club.

== International career ==
Alef played at the 2015 FIFA U-20 World Cup with Brazil.
