= Alexandros Bimai =

Greek footballer (born 1997)

Personal information
- Date of birth: 11 July 1997 (age 29)
- Place of birth: Athens, Greece
- Height: 1.81 m (5 ft 11 in)
- Position: Midfielder

Youth career
- 2013–2016: Panionios
- 2016–2017: PAS Giannina

Senior career*
Years	Team	Apps	(Gls)
2017–2018	Kallithea	1	(0)
2018	Alimos	14	(1)
2018–	Apollon Larissa	14	(1)
- * Club domestic league appearances and goals as of 9 March 2020

Alexandros Bimai (Greek: Αλέξανδρος Μπιμάι; born 11 July 1997) is a Greek professional footballer who plays as a midfielder.
