= Giannis Sardelis =

Greek footballer

Personal information
- Full name: Ioannis Sardelis
- Date of birth: 3 November 2000 (age 26)
- Place of birth: Methoni, Messenia, Greece
- Height: 1.71 m (5 ft 7 in)
- Position: Attacking midfielder

Team information
- Current team: PAS Pyrgos
- Number: 20

Youth career
- 2016–2019: AEK Athens

Senior career*
| Years | Team | Apps | (Gls) |
| 2018–2021 | AEK Athens | 1 | (0) |
| 2021–2024 | Panathinaikos B | 70 | (12) |
| 2024–2026 | Athens Kallithea | 16 | (0) |
| 2026– | PAS Pyrgos | 3 | (0) |

International career^{‡}
| 2018 | Greece U18 | 4 | (0) |
| 2018 | Greece U19 | 2 | (0) |
| 2021–2022 | Greece U21 | 5 | (2) |
- * Club domestic league appearances and goals as of 27 September 2026 ‡ National team caps and goals as of 29 March 2022

Ioannis "Giannis" Sardelis (Greek: Ιωάννης "Γιάννης" Σαρδέλης; born 3 November 2000) is a Greek professional footballer who plays as an attacking midfielder for Super League 2 club PAS Pyrgos.
