= Giannis Tsivelekidis =

Greek footballer

Personal information
- Full name: Ioannis Tsivelekidis
- Date of birth: 4 June 1999 (age 27)
- Place of birth: Athens, Greece
- Height: 1.87 m (6 ft 2 in)
- Position: Centre-back

Team information
- Current team: Levadiakos
- Number: 37

Youth career
- 2006–2007: Atromitos
- 2007–2018: AEK Athens

Senior career*
Years	Team	Apps	(Gls)
2018–2020	AEK Athens	0	(0)
2019	→ Kalamata (loan)	5	(0)
2020–2021	Fužinar	13	(0)
2021–2024	Nõmme Kalju	85	(8)
2024–2025	Athens Kallithea	38	(0)
2025–	Levadiakos	14	(0)
- * Club domestic league appearances and goals as of 20 September 2026

Giannis Tsivelekidis (Greek: Γιάννης Τσιβελεκίδης; born 4 June 1999) is a Greek professional footballer who plays as a centre-back for Super League club Levadiakos.
