= Victor Klonaridis =

Belgian footballer

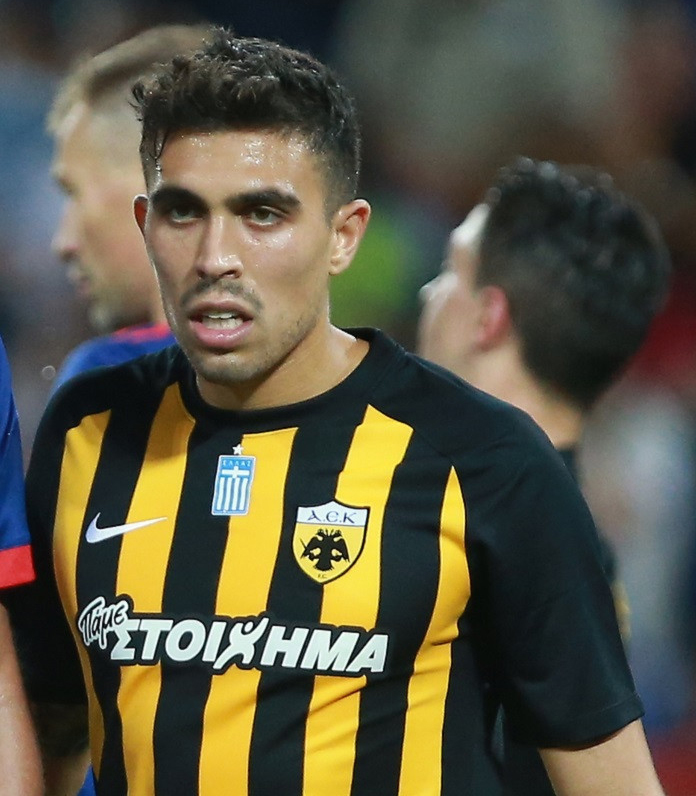
- Klonaridis with AEK Athens in 2017

Personal information
- Full name: Dorian Victor Klonaridis
- Date of birth: 28 July 1992 (age 34)
- Place of birth: Seraing, Belgium
- Height: 1.80 m (5 ft 11 in)
- Position: Forward

Team information
- Current team: Aris Petroupolis

Youth career
- 2007–2010: AEK Athens

Senior career*
Years	Team	Apps	(Gls)
2010–2012	AEK Athens	20	(4)
2012–2013	Lille	3	(0)
2013	→ Royal Excel Mouscron (loan)	8	(2)
2013–2016	Panathinaikos	74	(14)
2016–2017	Lens	13	(2)
2017	→ Panathinaikos (loan)	16	(4)
2017–2020	AEK Athens	41	(5)
2020–2021	APOEL	39	(7)
2021–2023	Atromitos	46	(4)
2023	Ümraniyespor	11	(1)
2024	A.E. Kifisia	12	(0)
2024	Forge FC	3	(0)
2025	Lamia	4	(0)
2025	Forge FC	2	(0)
2026–	Aris Petroupolis	0	(0)

International career^{‡}
2012	Belgium U20	1	(0)
- * Club domestic league appearances and goals as of 18 January 2026 ‡ National team caps and goals as of 22:35, 13 September 2012 (UTC)

Dorian Victor Klonaridis (Greek: Ντοριάν Βίκτωρ Κλωναρίδης, born 28 July 1992) is a Belgian professional footballer who plays as a forward for Gamma Ethniki club Aris Petroupolis.

== Career ==
=== AEK Athens ===
Klonaridis emerged from the AEK Athens academy as a young prodigy, signing his first professional contract with the club at the age of 18. During his first stint at the club, he made some notable appearances against Panathinaikos FC where he scored his first professional goal in the Greek Super League and then proceeded to score 3 more goals in the championship. After his impressive performances in the championship and in European football, he secured a transfer with Lille OSC.

=== Lille ===
On 2 July 2012, Klonaridis signed a three-year contract with Lille OSC for a reported fee of €800,000. On 31 January 2013, he joined Belgian Second Division side Mouscron-Péruwelz on loan from Lille.

=== Panathinaikos ===
On 3 August 2013, Panathinaikos paid to AEK Athens €1 million for his transfer (just like with Georgios Koutroumpis the same summer) and Klonaridis signing a 4-year contract with the "Greens". On 25 September 2013, he scored on his debut, against Ergotelis in the Greek Cup. On 10 November 2013, he netted twice in a 2–0 win against Aris. On 14 May 2014, he helped his club claim Greece's second Champions League spot scoring in a 1–1 draw against Atromitos in the playoffs, which left Panathinaikos with an unassailable lead at the top of the table with one match left.

At the beginning of 2015–16 season, Klonaridis faced injury problems causing him to train separately from the rest of the squad. On 28 October 2015, he scored his first goal for the season, playing in the Greek Cup against Levadiakos. On 3 December 2015, Panathinaikos won 2–1 against Panachaiki at Pampeloponnisiako Stadium thanks to a brace scored by him in the first half. On 23 May 2016, he scored in a 3–0 defeat of rivals AEK Athens] reaching 100 appearances with for Panathinaikos.

On 14 August 2016, Panathinaikos accepted a bid from Belgian club Lokeren for a transfer fee, reported to be in the region of €300,000. However, the move was not completed.

=== Lens ===
On 31 August 2016, the last day of the summer transfer window, Klonaridis returned to France, signing a two-year contract with Ligue 2 club Lens, for an undisclosed fee.

==== Loan to Panathinaikos ====
On 30 January 2017, Klonaridis returned to Panathinaikos, initially on loan, but with an option for the Greek club to sign him permanently. On 31 May 2017, his goal and overall positive performance, helped his club to succeed an away 3–2 win against rivals PAOK in the last matchday of the 2016–17 Play-offs depriving them of the possibility to participate in the UEFA Champions League third qualifying round.

=== Return to AEK Athens ===
On 29 June 2017, Klonaridis returned to AEK Athens by signing a contract until June 2020. AEK paid €200,000 to acquire Klonaridis from Lens. On 8 August 2018, he scored before the break in a 1–1 away draw for UEFA Champions League Third qualifying round, 1st leg against Celtic. On 22 August 2018, he scored, slamming home the rebound from close range after Anastasios Bakasetas' snapshot had been parried by MOL Vidi's goalkeeper Ádám Kovácsik in a glorious 2–1 away win for UEFA Champions League Playoffs, 1st leg against MOL Vidi.

On 16 September 2018, Klonaridis scored his first brace with the club in a 4–0 home win game against Panionios, as six minutes from full time with a piece of individual skill, skipping past the challenge of Luis Gustavo Dominques before firing a powerful shot beyond Panthers goalkeeper Filip Manojlović and at the last minute of the match scoring his second of the night, slotting home after good work from striker Marko Livaja. On 2 October 2018, he scored a brace in a 2–3 loss UEFA Champions League home game against Benfica. In both goals, he scored with a right footed shot from very close range after assisted by Niklas Hult and Marios Oikonomou respectively, but after the AEK forward missed a chance for his hat-trick, Alfa Semedo's long-range strike won it for Benfica on the counterattack. He has become the team's first player in history to score twice in one single group match.

On 22 January 2020, Klonaridis scored his first goal for the season, after a Hélder Lopes assist, in a 3–1 away win against Volos. The speedy 27-year-old has previously been plagued by injuries this season. The goal was Klonaridis' first since 2 October 2018, when he scored twice in a 3–2 home defeat to Benfica in the UEFA Champions League group stage. On 1 March 2020, Klonaridis scored a stunning goal in stoppage time to salvage a thrilling 1–1 away draw for AEK against Panionios. On 30 June 2020, Klonaridis solved his contract with the club. At times, the talented 27-year-old forward showed glimpses of his potential, but he was often hindered by injury problems and a lack of consistency.

=== APOEL ===
On 7 July 2020, Klonaridis joined Cypriot club APOEL on a free transfer.

=== Atromitos ===
On 17 July 2021, Klonaridis returned to Greece and signed a two-year contract with Atromitos.

== Personal life ==
Klonaridis was born in Belgium to a Greek father and a Belgian mother of Flemish ethnicity. He spent the first years of his life in Uganda.

== Career statistics ==
As of 3 November 2025

Appearances and goals by club, season and competition
Club	Season	League			National cup (Note: Includes Coupe de France, Greek Cup, Cypriot Cup)		League cup (Note: Includes Coupe de la Ligue)		Continental		Other		Total	
Club	Season	Division	Apps	Goals	Apps	Goals	Apps	Goals	Apps	Goals	Apps	Goals		
AEK Athens	2010–11	Super League Greece	1	0	0	0	—		0	0	—		1	0
AEK Athens	2011–12	Super League Greece	19	4	0	0	—		3	1	—		22	5
AEK Athens	Total		20	4	0	0	—		3	1	—		23	5
Lille	2012–13	Ligue 1	3	0	1	0	1	0	0	0	—		5	0
Mouscron (loan)	2012–13	Belgian Second Division	7	2	0	0	—		—		—		7	2
Panathinaikos	2013–14	Super League Greece	32	9	8	2	—		—		—		40	11
Panathinaikos	2014–15	Super League Greece	29	3	4	2	—		6	1	—		39	6
Panathinaikos	2015–16	Super League Greece	13	2	6	4	—		2	0	—		21	6
Panathinaikos	Total		74	14	18	8	—		8	1	—		100	23
Lens	2016–17	Ligue 2	10	1	2	1	0	0	—		—		12	2
Panathinaikos (loan)	2016–17	Super League Greece	16	4	4	2	—		0	0	—		20	6
AEK Athens	2017–18	Super League Greece	12	1	4	0	—		8	0	—		24	1
AEK Athens	2018–19	Super League Greece	22	2	6	0	—		9	4	—		37	6
AEK Athens	2019–20	Super League Greece	7	2	2	0	—		2	0	—		11	2
AEK Athens	Total		41	5	12	0	—		19	4	—		72	9
APOEL	2020–21	Cypriot First Division	32	6	4	1	—		3	0	39	7		
Atromitos	2021–22	Super League Greece	19	2	0	0	—		—		—		19	2
Atromitos	2022–23	Super League Greece	25	1	2	1	—		—		—		27	2
Atromitos	Total		44	3	2	1	0	0	0	0	—		46	4
Ümraniyespor	2023–24	TFF First League	11	1	1	1	—		—		—		12	2
A.E. Kifisia	2023–24	Super League Greece	12	0	0	0	—		—		—		12	0
Forge FC	2024	Canadian Premier League	3	0	0	0	—		0	0	0	0	3	0
Lamia	2024–25	Super League Greece	4	0	0	0	—		—		—		4	0
Forge FC	2025	Canadian Premier League	2	0	1	0	—		0	0	0	0	3	0
Career total			279	40	45	14	1	0	33	6	358	60		

== Honours ==
AEK Athens

- Super League Greece: 2017–18
- Greek Cup: 2010–11

Panathinaikos

- Greek Cup: 2013–14
