= 2015–16 Panathinaikos F.C. season =

Panathinaikos
2015–16 season
- Chairman: Giannis Alafouzos
- Manager: Andrea Stramaccioni
- Stadium: Leoforos Alexandras Stadium
- Super League Greece: 2nd
- Greek Cup: Quarter-finals
- UEFA Champions League: Third qualifying round
- UEFA Europa League: Play-off round
- Top goalscorer: League: Marcus Berg (17); All: Marcus Berg (19)
| Home colours | Away colours | Third colours |

The 2015–16 Panathinaikos season was the club's 57th consecutive season in the Super League Greece. They will also compete in the Greek Cup. Qualifying rounds will determine whether the club will compete in the UEFA Champions League or the UEFA Europa League.

== Players ==
| No. | Name | Nationality | Position (s) | Date of Birth (Age) | Signed from | Notes |
Goalkeepers
| 1 | Stefanos Kotsolis | (Greece) | GK | 5 June 1979 (35) | (Cyprus) Omonia | Originally from youth system |
| 15 | Luke Steele | (England) | GK | 24 September 1984 (29) | (England) Barnsley | |
| 45 | Nikos Giannakopoulos | (Greece) | GK | 19 February 1993 (22) | (Greece) Panionios | |
| 61 | Konstantinos Kotsaris | (Greece) | GK | 25 July 1996 (18) | Youth system | |
| 99 | Odisseas Vlachodimos | (Greece) | GK | 26 April 1994 (21) | (Germany) VfB Stuttgart | |
Defenders
| 3 | Diamantis Chouchoumis | (Greece) | LB / LM | 17 July 1994 (20) | Youth system | |
| 4 | Georgios Koutroumpis | (Greece) | CB | 10 February 1991 (23) | (Greece) AEK Athens | |
| 11 | Jens Wemmer | (Germany) | RB | 31 October 1985 (30) | (Germany) SC Paderborn | |
| 12 | Nikos Marinakis | (Greece) | RB | 12 September 1993 (21) | Youth system | |
| 20 | Efstathios Tavlaridis | (Greece) | CB | 25 January 1980 (34) | (Greece) Atromitos | |
| 21 | Nano | (Spain) | LB / LM | 27 October 1984 (30) | (Spain) Ponferradina | |
| 24 | Sergio Sánchez | (Spain) | CB | 3 April 1986 (age 29) | (Spain) Málaga | |
| 25 | Rasmus Thelander | (Denmark) | CB | 9 July 1991 (23) | (Denmark) Aalborg BK | |
| 27 | Giandomenico Mesto | (Italy) | RB | 25 May 1982 (33) | (Italy) Napoli | |
| 31 | Rodrigo Moledo | (Brazil) | CB | 27 October 1987 (28) | (Brazil) Internacional | |
Midfielders
| 2 | Michael Essien | (Ghana) | DM | 3 December 1982 (32) | (Italy) Milan | |
| 6 | Mehdi Abeid | (Algeria) | CM/AM / RM | 6 August 1992 (23) | (England) Newcastle United | |
| 8 | Anastasios Lagos | (Greece) | DM/CM | 12 April 1992 (22) | Youth system | |
| 10 | Zeca | (Greece) | CM/AM | 31 August 1988 (25) | (Portugal) Vitória de Setúbal | |
| 14 | Abdul Jeleel Ajagun | (Nigeria) | RW / AM / LW | 10 February 1993 (21) | (Nigeria) Dolphins | |
| 16 | Vasilis Angelopoulos | (Greece) | DM / CM | 12 February 1997 (19) | Youth system | |
| 17 | Robin Lod | (Finland) | CM | 17 April 1993 (22) | (Finland) HJK Helsinki | |
| 19 | Lucas Villafáñez | (Argentina) | W / AM | 4 October 1991 (24) | (Argentina) Independiente | |
| 23 | Nikos Kaltsas | (Greece) | RM / RW / AM | 3 May 1990 (25) | (Greece) Veria | |
| 30 | Olivier Boumale | (Cameroon) | W | 17 September 1989 (26) | (Greece) Panionios | |
| 32 | Danijel Pranjić | (Croatia) | LM / LB | 2 December 1981 (33) | (Portugal) Sporting CP | |
| 71 | Panagiotis Vlachodimos | (Greece) | W | 12 October 1991 (24) | Free agent | |
| 95 | Lucas Evangelista | (Brazil) | CM | 6 May 1995 (20) | (Italy) Udinese | On Loan |
Forwards
| 5 | Sebastián Leto | (Argentina) | W / F | 30 August 1986 (29) | (Italy) Catania | |
| 7 | Viktor Klonaridis | (Belgium) | RW / AM / LW | 28 July 1992 (22) | (France) Lille | |
| 9 | Marcus Berg | (Sweden) | CF | 17 August 1986 (27) | (Germany) Hamburger SV | |
| 33 | Mladen Petrić | (Croatia) | CF | 1 January 1981 (33) | (England) West Ham United | |
| 36 | Lazaros Lamprou | (Greece) | CF | 19 December 1997 (18) | Youth system | |
| 77 | Yuri Mamute | (Brazil) | CF | 7 May 1995 (20) | (Brazil) Grêmio | On Loan |

== Transfers ==
=== In ===
| Date | Squad # | Position | Player | Transferred From | Fee | Source |
|---|---|---|---|---|---|---|
| 30 June 2015 | | GK | (Greece) Nestoras Gekas | (Greece) Fostiras | Return from loan | |
| 30 June 2015 | | GK | (Greece) Alexandros Tabakis | (Netherlands) VVV-Venlo | Return from loan | |
| 30 June 2015 | | DF | (Greece) Spyros Risvanis | (Greece) Panionios | Return from loan | |
| 30 June 2015 | | MF | (Albania) Maldin Ymeraj | (Greece) Fostiras | Return from loan | |
| 1 July 2015 | 23 | MF | (Greece) Nikos Kaltsas | (Greece) Veria | Free | |
| 1 July 2015 | 17 | MF | (Finland) Robin Lod | (Finland) HJK Helsinki | €350,000 | |
| 1 July 2015 | 11 | DF | (Germany) Jens Wemmer | (Germany) SC Paderborn | Free | |
| 1 July 2015 | 2 | MF | (Ghana) Michael Essien | (Italy) Milan | Free | |
| 2 July 2015 | 25 | DF | (Denmark) Rasmus Thelander | (Denmark) Aalborg BK | €300,000 | |
| 7 July 2015 | 24 | DF | (Spain) Sergio Sánchez | (Spain) Málaga | Free | |
| 24 July 2015 | 41 | DF | (Greece) Stefanos Evangelou | (Greece) Panionios | €300,000 | |
| 29 July 2015 | 45 | GK | (Greece) Nikos Giannakopoulos | (Greece) Panionios | Free | |
| 21 August 2015 | 6 | MF | (Algeria) Mehdi Abeid | (England) Newcastle United | €600,000 | |
| 29 December 2015 | 30 | W | (Cameroon) Olivier Boumale | (Greece) Panionios | €300,000 | |
| 31 December 2015 | 27 | RB | (Italy) Giandomenico Mesto | (Italy) Napoli | Free | |
| 6 January 2016 | 71 | W | (Greece) Panagiotis Vlachodimos | Free agent | Free | |
| 8 January 2016 | 77 | ST | (Brazil) Yuri Mamute | (Brazil) Grêmio | Loan | |
| 20 January 2016 | 95 | CM | (Brazil) Lucas Evangelista | (Italy) Udinese | Loan | |
| 26 January 2016 | 99 | GK | (Germany) (Greece) Odisseas Vlachodimos | (Germany) VfB Stuttgart | Free | |
| 29 January 2016 | 31 | CB | (Brazil) Rodrigo Moledo | (Brazil) Internacional | Free | |
| 1 February 2016 | 19 | W / AM | (Argentina) Lucas Villafáñez | (Argentina) Independiente | €200,000 | |
| 2 February 2016 | 5 | W / F | (Argentina) Sebastián Leto | (Italy) Catania | Free | |

Total spending: ▼€2,050,000

=== Promoted from youth system ===
| Date | Squad # | Position | Player | Signed Until | Source |
|---|---|---|---|---|---|
| 19 June 2015 | | MF | (Greece) Giorgos Angelopoulos | 30 June 2018 | |

=== Out ===
| Date | Squad # | Position | Player | Transferred To | Fee | Source |
|---|---|---|---|---|---|---|
| 30 June 2015 | | DF | (Croatia) Gordon Schildenfeld | (Russia) Dynamo Moscow | End of loan | |
| 30 June 2015 | | MF | (Netherlands) Ouasim Bouy | (Italy) Juventus | End of loan | |
| 30 June 2015 | | MF | (Greece) Charis Mavrias | (England) Sunderland | End of loan | |
| 30 June 2015 | | FW | (Sweden) Valmir Berisha | (Italy) Roma | End of loan | |
| 17 July 2015 | | DF | (Greece) Spyros Risvanis | (Greece) Panionios | Free | |
| 11 August 2015 | | MF | (Greece) Thanasis Dinas | (Greece) Platanias | Free | |
| 11 August 2015 | | MF | (Albania) Maldin Ymeraj | (Sweden) Akropolis | Free | |
| 20 August 2015 | | GK | (Greece) Nestoras Gekas | (Greece) Panthrakikos | Free | |
| 1 September 2015 | | DF | (Greece) Panagiotis Spyropoulos | (Greece) AEL Kalloni | Free | |
| 30 December 2015 | | GK | (Greece) Alexandros Tabakis | (United States) Atlanta United | Free | |
| 12 January 2016 | 19 | CF | (Greece) Nikos Karelis | (Belgium) Genk | €3,000,000 | |
| 18 January 2016 | 29 | M | (Greece) Sotiris Ninis | (Belgium) Charleroi | Free | |
| 22 January 2016 | 5 | DF | (Greece) Konstantinos Triantafyllopoulos | (Greece) Asteras Tripolis | Free | |
| 31 January 2016 | 14 | M | (Nigeria) Abdul Jeleel Ajagun | (Greece) Levadiakos | Loan | |
| 1 February 2016 | 28 | RB | (Greece) Christos Bourbos | | Free | |
| 15 February 2016 | 18 | CM | (Greece) Christos Donis | (Switzerland) Lugano | Loan | |

Total income: ▲€3,000,000

Expenditure: ▲€950,000

== Pre-season and friendlies ==
| 5 July 2015 Friendly | Panathinaikos | 10–0 | AFC Arnhem | Arnhem, Netherlands |
| 18:30 | Petrić 12', 36'; Kaltsas 30'; Berg 32', 34', 40'; Klonaridis 53', 87'; Karelis 79'; Lod 80' | Report | | Stadium: Schuytgraaf |

| 7 July 2015 Friendly | Club Brugge | 2–1 | Panathinaikos | Garderen, Netherlands |
| 19:00 | Diaby 27'; De fauw 49' | Report | Karelis 21' | Stadium: Stadio Garderen |

| 10 July 2015 Friendly | Ajax | 2–0 | Panathinaikos | Epe, Netherlands |
| 20:30 | Milik 33'; El Ghazi 87' | Report | | Stadium: Stadio SV EPE |

| 18 July 2015 Friendly | Levadiakos | 1–3 | Panathinaikos | Levadia, Greece |
| 19:30 | Milhazes 13' | Report | 44' Kaltsas; 47' Petrić; 84' Karelis | Stadium: Levadia Municipal Stadium |

| 22 July 2015 Friendly | Panathinaikos | 1–2 | Udinese | Athens, Greece |
| 21:00 | Berg 56' | Report | Fernandes 9'; Aguirre 76' | Stadium: Leoforos Alexandras Stadium |

| 12 August 2015 Friendly | Real Sociedad | 3–0 | Panathinaikos | San Sebastián, Spain |
| 21:00 | Bruma 82'; Canales 87'; Agirretxe 88' | Report | | Stadium: Anoeta |

== Competitions ==
=== Super League Greece ===
==== Regular season ====
===== League table =====
| Pos | Team | Pld | W | D | L | GF | GA | GD | Pts | Qualification or relegation |
|---|---|---|---|---|---|---|---|---|---|---|
| 1 | Olympiacos (C) | 30 | 28 | 1 | 1 | 81 | 16 | +65 | 85 | Qualification for the Champions League third qualifying round |
| 2 | Panathinaikos (Note: Panathinaikos were deducted 3 points due to extreme fan behavior against Olympiacos. The match was awarded as a 3–0 win for Olympiacos.) | 30 | 18 | 4 | 8 | 52 | 26 | +26 | 55 | Qualification for the Play-offs |
| 3 | AEK Athens (Note: AEK were deducted 3 points due to extreme fan behavior against Atromitos.) | 30 | 17 | 6 | 7 | 43 | 21 | +22 | 54 | Qualification for the Play-offs |
| 4 | PAOK (Note: PAOK were deducted 3 points due to extreme fan behavior against Olympiacos in Greek Cup semifinal match.) | 30 | 13 | 9 | 8 | 45 | 32 | +13 | 45 | Qualification for the Play-offs |
| 5 | Panionios | 30 | 12 | 8 | 10 | 33 | 27 | +6 | 44 | Qualification for the Play-offs |

Source: Super League Greece
Rules for classification: 1) Points; 2) Head-to-head points; 3) Head-to-head goal difference; 4) Goals scored; 5) Goals against; 6) Play-offs (neutral ground); 7) Draw.
(Note: Criteria 6 is only used if needed to decide champion, teams for relegation or teams for UEFA competitions).
(C) Champions

===== Matches =====
| 24 August 2015 1 | Panetolikos | 1–2 | Panathinaikos | Agrinio |
| 21:30 (UTC+3) | Kappel (yellow card) 26', (goal) 41'; Papazoglou (yellow card) 45'; Kevin (yellow card) 81' | Summary | Tavlaridis (yellow card) 24'; Koutroumpis (yellow card) 27'; Marinakis (yellow card) 45'; Karelis 51'; Lagos (yellow card) 53'; Berg 84' | Stadium: Panetolikos Stadium; Attendance: 4,160; Referee: Anastasios Sidiropoulos |

| 30 August 2015 2 | Panathinaikos | 4–0 | Kalloni | Athens |
| 19:15 (UTC+3) | Karelis 8'; Berg 31'; Lagos (yellow card) 43'; Tavlaridis 57'; Petrić 80'; Zeca (yellow card) 90+4' | Summary | Kaltsas (yellow card) 14'; Ellacopulos (yellow card) 43'; Tsabouris (yellow card) 81' | Stadium: Leoforos Alexandras Stadium; Attendance: 7,968; Referee: Spyros Selimos |

| 13 September 2015 3 | Panionios | 1–0 | Panathinaikos | Athens |
| 20:30 (UTC+3) | Bakasetas 8'; Papadopoulos (yellow card) 90+3' | Summary | Abeid (yellow card) 38'; Karelis (yellow card) 65'; Berg (yellow card) 84'; Tavlaridis (yellow card) 87'; Kaltsas (yellow card) 90+4' | Stadium: Nea Smyrni Stadium; Attendance: 2,762; Referee: Andreas Pappas |

| 23 September 2015 4 | Panathinaikos | 3–0 | Levadiakos | Athens |
| 16:00 (UTC+3) | Nano 5'; Karelis 14'; Ajagun 19'; Thelander (yellow card) 37' | Summary | Ouon (yellow card) 4'; Jahić (yellow card) 47' | Stadium: Leoforos Alexandras Stadium; Attendance: 5,566; Referee: Georgios Kominis |

| 27 September 2015 5 | Panathinaikos | 1–0 | Platanias | Athens |
| 16:00 (UTC+3) | Ajagun 45+1' | Summary | Selin (yellow card) 49'; Coulibaly (yellow card) 64' | Stadium: Leoforos Alexandras Stadium; Attendance: 8,612; Referee: Ioannis Delfakis |

| 3 October 2015 6 | Skoda Xanthi | 0–1 | Panathinaikos | Pigadia |
| 20:30 (UTC+3) | | Summary | Berg (yellow card) 7'; Zeca (yellow card) 33'; Abeid (yellow card) 60'; Karelis (yellow card) 77'; Thelander 83'; Lagos (yellow card) 90+4' | Stadium: Skoda Xanthi Arena; Attendance: 2,422; Referee: Mihail Voskakis |

| 19 October 2015 7 | Panathinaikos | 3–1 | PAS Giannina | Athens |
| 17:15 (UTC+3) | Karelis 17'; Petrić 60' (pen.); Nano (yellow card) 65'; Tavlaridis (yellow card) 70'; Zeca (yellow card) 75'; Abeid 90+3' | Summary | Michail (yellow card) 53'; Berios (yellow card) 59'; Chávez 70' (pen.), (yellow card) 83'; Ferfelis (yellow card) 81'; Manias (yellow card) 90' | Stadium: Leoforos Alexandras Stadium; Attendance: 7,823; Referee: Marios Labropoulos |

| 25 October 2015 8 | PAOK | 3–1 | Panathinaikos | Thessaloniki |
| 19:30 (UTC+2) | Berbatov 28' (pen.); Rodrigues 31'; Vítor 42', (yellow card) 44'; Tzavellas (yellow card) 47'; Leovac (yellow card) 73'; Mak (yellow card) 84' | Summary | Tavlaridis (yellow card) 27'; Karelis 74' (pen.) | Stadium: Toumba Stadium; Attendance: 15,374; Referee: Alexander Aretopoulos |

| 1 November 2015 9 | Panathinaikos | 0–0 | AEK Athens | Athens |
| 19:30 (UTC+2) | Berg (yellow card) 58' | Summary | Vilà (yellow card) 56' | Stadium: Leoforos Alexandras Stadium; Attendance: 15,640; Referee: Stavros Mantalos |

| 7 November 2015 10 | Atromitos | 1–2 | Panathinaikos | Athens |
| 19:30 (UTC+2) | Godoy (yellow card) 17'; Napoleoni 53'; Lazaridis (yellow card) 80' | Summary | Berg (yellow card) 16', (goal) 84'; Ninis (yellow card) 22'; Lod (yellow card) 50'; Karelis 72'; Ajagun (yellow card) 80' | Stadium: Peristeri Stadium; Attendance: 1,414; Referee: Georgios Kizas |

| 21 November 2015 11 | Panathinaikos | 0–3 | Olympiacos | Athens |
| 19:30 (UTC+2) | | Summary | | Stadium: Leoforos Alexandras Stadium; Referee: Andrea appas |

| 28 November 2015 12 | Iraklis | 1–0 | Panathinaikos | Thessaloniki |
| 19:30 (UTC+2) | Vellios 23' (yellow card) 39'; Boukouvalas (yellow card) 59'; Ziabaris (yellow card) 61'; Huanderson (yellow card) 90'; Chanti (yellow card) 90+4' | Summary | Zeca (yellow card) 21'; Tavlaridis (yellow card) 61'; Karelis (yellow card) 75'; Berg (yellow card) 78'; Sánchez (yellow card) 85'; Ninis (yellow card) 90+2' | Stadium: Kaftanzoglio Stadium; Attendance: 6,160; Referee: Georgios Kominis |

| 6 December 2015 13 | Veria | 0–1 | Panathinaikos | Veria |
| 19:30 (UTC+2) | Neto (yellow card) 35'; Giannoulis (yellow card) 40'; López (yellow card) 90+5' | Summary | Sánchez (yellow card) 16'; Essien (yellow card) 22'; Karelis 86' | Stadium: Veria Stadium; Attendance: 1,035; Referee: Ioannis Delfakis |

| 13 December 2015 14 | Panathinaikos | 2–0 | Asteras Tripolis | Athens |
| 19:30 (UTC+2) | Karelis 72'; Kaltsas 90+4' | Summary | Lluy (yellow card) 34'; Hamdani (yellow card) 60' | Stadium: Leoforos Alexandras Stadium; Referee: Michael Koukoulakis |

| 20 December 2015 15 | Panthrakikos | 1–0 | Panathinaikos | Komotini |
| 19:30 (UTC+2) | Rogério 26'; Cherfa (yellow card) 54' | Summary | Pranjić (yellow card) 37'; Koutroumpis (yellow card) 61' (yellow-red card) 85' | Stadium: Komotini Municipal Stadium; Attendance: 1,573; Referee: Anastasios Sidiropoulos |

| 4 January 2016 16 | Panathinaikos | 4–2 | Panetolikos | Athens |
| 19:30 (UTC+2) | Abeid 6', 90+2', (yellow card) 44'; Petrić 11', 51'; Essien (yellow card) 36' | Summary | Villafáñez 2'; Markovski 16'; Kappel (yellow card) 62'; Mygas (yellow card) 79' | Stadium: Leoforos Alexandras Stadium; Referee: Thanasis Tzilos |

| 11 January 2016 16 | Kalloni | 0–2 | Panathinaikos | Mytilene |
| 19:30 (UTC+2) | Tsabouris (yellow card) 42' | Summary | Kaltsas 47'; Pranjić (yellow card) 65'; Boumal 90' | Stadium: Mytilene Municipal Stadium; Attendance: 1,766; Referee: Athanasios Giachos |

| 17 January 2016 17 | Panathinaikos | 0–0 | Panionios | Athens |
| 19:30 (UTC+2) | Abeid (yellow card) 56' | Summary | Chatziisaias (yellow card) 36'; Karamanos (yellow card) 90+1' | Stadium: Leoforos Alexandras Stadium; Referee: Anastasios Papapetrou |

| 24 January 2016 19 | Levadiakos | 0–2 | Panathinaikos | Livadeia |
| 15:00 (UTC+2) | Mendy (yellow card) 43'; Nabouhane (yellow card) 68'; Stathis (yellow card) 74'; A. Mangas (yellow card) 79' | Summary | Berg 57'; Essien 78'; Abeid (yellow card) 85' | Stadium: Levadia Municipal Stadium; Attendance: 1,708; Referee: Alexandros Dimitropoulos |

| 31 January 2016 20 | Platanias | 2–3 | Panathinaikos | Chania |
| 17:15 (UTC+2) | Alkis (yellow card) 12'; Yaya (yellow card) 44'; Coulibaly (yellow card) 55'; Goundoulakis 62'; Ramos 73' | Summary | Kaltsas 45+1', 53'; Klonaridis 69'; Tavlaridis (yellow card) 90+2' | Stadium: Perivolia Municipal Stadium; Attendance: 3,052; Referee: Ioannis Papadopoulos |

| 6 February 2016 21 | Panathinaikos | 0–1 | Skoda Xanthi | Athens |
| 19:30 (UTC+2) | Lagos (yellow card) 45'; Zeca (red card) 51'; Marinakis (yellow card) 50'; Kaltsas (yellow card) 53'; Moledo (yellow card) 90+1' | Summary | Baxevanidis (yellow card) 19'; Soltani (yellow card) 23' (goal) 67'; Bertos (yellow card) 34'; Lucero (yellow card) 53' | Stadium: Leoforos Alexandras Stadium; Attendance: 7,142; Referee: Stavros Mantalos |

| 14 February 2016 22 | PAS Giannina | 0–3 | Panathinaikos | Ioannina |
| 15:00 (UTC+2) | Acosta (yellow card) 53'; Karanikas (yellow card) 65'; Ilić (yellow card) 76' | Summary | Vlachodimos 26'; Zeca (yellow card) 36' (yellow-red card) 40'; Abeid (yellow card) 53'; Thelander (yellow card) 54'; Pranjić (yellow card) 67'; Lagos (yellow card) 75'; Berg 82', 90+1' | Stadium: Zosimades Stadium; Attendance: 2,703; Referee: Ioannis Delfakis |

| 21 February 2016 23 | Panathinaikos | 2–2 | PAOK | Athens |
| 19:30 (UTC+2) | Berg 10', (yellow card) 85'; Pranjić (yellow card) 17'; Lagos (yellow card) 28'; Koutroumpis (yellow card) 42'; Kaltsas 51'; Lod (yellow card) 62'; Mamute (yellow card) 90' | Summary | Cimirot (yellow card) 20', (goal) 56'; Malezas (yellow card) 40'; Charisis (yellow card) 42' (yellow-red card) 90+1'; Pelkas 67', (yellow card) 90'; Chatziisaias (yellow card) 71'; Kitsiou (yellow card) 78' | Stadium: Leoforos Alexandras Stadium; Attendance: 8,318; Referee: Georgios Kominis |

| 28 February 2016 24 | AEK Athens | 1–0 | Panathinaikos | Athens |
| 19:30 (UTC+2) | Vargas 78'; Simões (yellow card) 84'; Tzanetopoulos (yellow card) 89' | Summary | Zeca (yellow card) 68'; Vlachodimos (yellow card) 77'; Koutroumpis (yellow card) 88'; Mesto (yellow card) 90+1' (yellow-red card) 90+4'; Abeid (red card) 90+7' | Stadium: Olympic Stadium; Attendance: 20,930; Referee: Michael Koukoulakis |

| 6 March 2016 25 | Panathinaikos | 2–0 | Atromitos | Athens |
| 19:30 (UTC+2) | Evangelista 8'; Berg (yellow card) 68'; Villafáñez 70' (yellow card) 77' | Summary | K.Kivrakidis (yellow card) 35'; Bíttolo (yellow card) 37'; Matei (yellow card) 60'; Umbides (yellow card) 89' | Stadium: Leoforos Alexandras Stadium; Attendance: 4,809; Referee: Dimitrios Styliaras |

| 13 March 2016 26 | Olympiacos | 3–1 | Panathinaikos | Piraeus |
| 19:30 (UTC+2) | Salino (yellow card) 29'; Cambiasso 38'; Milivojević (yellow card) 40'; Costa (yellow card) 47', (goal) 87'; Ideye 89', (yellow card) 90' | Summary | Berg 3', (yellow card) 57'; Pranjić (yellow card) 10'; Mesto (yellow card) 59' | Stadium: Karaiskakis Stadium; Attendance: 30314; Referee: Georgios Kizas |

| 19 March 2016 27 | Panathinaikos | 4–0 | Iraklis | Athens |
| 19:30 (UTC+2) | Evangelista (yellow card) 3'; Berg 9', 68'; Moledo 27', 72'; Lod (yellow card) 35'; Nano (yellow card) 45'; Koutroumpis (yellow card) 76' | Summary | Boukouvalas (yellow card) 13'; Karasalidis (yellow card) 16'; Intzoglou (yellow card) 45+1'; Stamou (yellow card) 84' | Stadium: Leoforos Alexandras Stadium; Attendance: 5,086; Referee: Athanasios Giachos |

| 3 April 2016 28 | Panathinaikos | 3–2 | Veria | Athens |
| 19:00 (UTC+3) | Marangos 15' (o.g.); Leto (yellow card) 51', (goal) 65', 90+3'; Abeid (yellow card) 77' | Summary | Nazlidis 25'; Balafas (yellow card) 26'; Melikiotis 58'; Giannoulis (yellow card) 62' (yellow-red card) 90+5'; Neto (yellow card) 79' | Stadium: Leoforos Alexandras Stadium; Attendance: 5,081; Referee: Spyros Selimos |

| 10 April 2016 29 | Asteras Tripolis | 0–0 | Panathinaikos | Tripoli |
| 19:00 (UTC+3) | Iglesias (yellow card) 58'; Goian (yellow card) 73' | Summary | Moledo (yellow card) 82'; Leto (yellow card) 90+3' | Stadium: Theodoros Kolokotronis Stadium; Attendance: 2,326; Referee: Charalambos Kalogeropoulos |

| 17 April 2016 30 | Panathinaikos | 6–1 | Panthrakikos | Athens |
| 19:00 (UTC+3) | Berg 23', 41', 45+2', 52', 61'; Villafáñez 71' | Summary; Report | Baykara (yellow card) 26'; Moudouroglou 49' | Stadium: Leoforos Alexandras Stadium; Referee: Ioannis Mourtzakis |

==== Play-offs ====
===== League table =====
| Pos | Team | Pld | W | D | L | GF | GA | GD | Pts | Qualification |
|---|---|---|---|---|---|---|---|---|---|---|
| 2 | PAOK | 6 | 3 | 3 | 0 | 8 | 3 | +5 | 12 | Qualification for the Champions League third qualifying round |
| 3 | Panathinaikos | 6 | 2 | 3 | 1 | 8 | 6 | +2 | 11 | Qualification for the Europa League third qualifying round (Note: AEK Athens qualified for the Europa League third qualifying round by winning the Greek Cup.) |
| 4 | AEK Athens | 6 | 2 | 1 | 3 | 5 | 7 | −2 | 9 | Qualification for the Europa League third qualifying round |
| 5 | Panionios (Note: The fifth-placed team of the 2015–16 Super League Greece Panionios would have qualified for the Europa League second qualifying round, but were excluded from participating in the 2016–17 European competitions by UEFA for financial reasons. As a result, the berth was given to the sixth-placed team PAS Giannina.) | 6 | 1 | 1 | 4 | 2 | 7 | −5 | 4 | |

Source: Super League Greece: Standings, Schedule
Rules for classification: 1) Points; 2) Head-to-head points; 3) Head-to-head goal difference; 4) Goals scored; 5) Goals against; 6) Regular season position.

===== Matches =====
| 11 May 2016 1 | Panionios | 1–1 | Panathinaikos | Athens |
| 18:15 (UTC+3) | Ansarifard 52' | Summary | Leto 66' | Stadium: Nea Smyrni Stadium; Referee: Anastasios Papapetrou |

| 15 May 2016 2 | Panathinaikos | 1–1 | PAOK | Athens |
| 20:30 (UTC+3) | Koutroumpis (yellow card) 37'; Berg 46'; Tavlaridis (yellow card) 85'; Kaltsas (yellow card) 90+5' | Summary | Tziolis (red card) 20'; Charisis 49'; Malezas (yellow card) 53' | Stadium: Leoforos Alexandras Stadium; Referee: Georgios Kizas |

| 23 May 2016 3 | Panathinaikos | 3–0 | AEK Athens | Athens |
| 20:30 (UTC+3) | Lod 11', (yellow card) 17'; Berg 30', (yellow card) 75'; Mesto (yellow card) 82'; Klonaridis 90' | Summary | Aravidis (yellow card) 40'; Simões (yellow card) 59'; Vilà (yellow card) 72'; Arzo (yellow card) 75' | Stadium: Leoforos Alexandras Stadium; Attendance: 8,018; Referee: Anastasios Sidiropoulos |

| 26 May 2016 4 | AEK Athens | 3–1 | Panathinaikos | Athens |
| (UTC+3) | Johansson 5'; Barbosa 40', 69'; Bakakis (yellow card) 81' | Summary | Berg (yellow card) 21'; Villafáñez (yellow card) 45+3'; Leto 54'; Abeid (yellow card) 71'; Moledo (yellow card) 80' | Stadium: Olympic Stadium; Referee: Michael Koukoulakis |

| 29 May 2016 5 | Panathinaikos | 1–0 | Panionios | Athens |
| 18:15 (UTC+3) | Leto (yellow card) 37', (goal) 78'; Chouchoumis (yellow card) 88'; Klonaridis (yellow card) 90' | Summary | N. Katharios (yellow card) 27'; Risvanis (yellow card) 37' | Stadium: Leoforos Alexandras Stadium; Attendance: 4,910; Referee: Georgios Kizas |

| 31 May 2016 6 | PAOK | 1–1 | Panathinaikos | Thessaloniki |
| 20:15 (UTC+3) | Rodrigues 17'; Vítor (yellow card) 57'; Leovac (yellow card) 64'; Glykos (yellow card) 90+3' | Summary | Lod 26'; Evangelista (yellow card) 34'; Klonaridis (yellow card) 43'; Mesto (yellow card) 62'; Zeca (yellow card) 79'; Nano (yellow card) 89' | Stadium: Toumba Stadium; Attendance: 20,156; Referee: Alexander Aretopoulos |

=== Greek Cup ===
==== Group D ====
| Pos | Team | Pld | W | D | L | GF | GA | GD | Pts | Qualification | PAO | LEV | KER | PNA |
|---|---|---|---|---|---|---|---|---|---|---|---|---|---|---|
| 1 | Panathinaikos | 3 | 2 | 1 | 0 | 6 | 2 | +4 | 7 | Round of 16 | | 3–0 | — | — |
| 2 | Levadiakos | 3 | 2 | 0 | 1 | 6 | 4 | +2 | 6 | Round of 16 | — | | 2–0 | — |
| 3 | Kerkyra | 3 | 0 | 2 | 1 | 2 | 4 | −2 | 2 | | 1–1 | — | | 1–1 |
| 4 | Panachaiki | 3 | 0 | 1 | 2 | 3 | 7 | −4 | 1 | | 1–2 | 1–4 | — | |

Source: epo.gr

| 28 October 2015 1 | Panathinaikos | 3–0 | Levadiakos | Athens |
| 17:15 (UTC+2) | Ninis 24' (pen.); Tavlaridis 27'; Klonaridis 77' | Summary | Machairas (yellow card) 29' | Stadium: Leoforos Alexandras Stadium; Referee: Stavros Tritsonis |

| 3 December 2015 2 | Panachaiki | 1–2 | Panathinaikos | Patras |
| 19:30 (UTC+2) | Đilas (yellow card) 86'; G. Kargas (yellow card) 89', (goal) 90+1' | Summary | Klonaridis 7', 42'; Koutroumpis (yellow card) 86' | Stadium: Kostas Davourlis Stadium; Referee: Spyros Selimos |

| 17 December 2015 3 | Kerkyra | 1–1 | Panathinaikos | Corfu |
| 17:00 (UTC+2) | P. Vlachos 4'; Fábio (yellow card) 52' | Summary | Lod (yellow card) 8'; Lagos (yellow card) 90'; Klonaridis 90+4' | Stadium: Kerkyra Stadium; Referee: Alexandros Katsikogiannis |

==== Round of 16 ====
| 7 January 2016 First leg | PAS Giannina | 1–2 | Panathinaikos | Ioannina |
| 15:00 (UTC+2) | Acosta 57'; Karanikas (red card) 67'; Tsoukalas (yellow card) 77'; Tzimopoulos (yellow card) 85' | Summary | Pranjić (yellow card) 20'; Abeid 75'; Petrić 78' | Stadium: Zosimades Stadium; Referee: Stavros Mantalos |

| 14 January 2016 Second leg | Panathinaikos | 0–1 (a2–2 agg.) | PAS Giannina | Athens |
| 19:30 (UTC+2) | Berg (yellow card) 57'; Wemmer (yellow card) 85' | Summary | Skondras (yellow card) 47'; Karanikas (yellow card) 72'; Ferfelis 90+3' | Stadium: Leoforos Alexandras Stadium; Referee: Dimitros Karantonis |

==== Quarter-finals ====
| 27 January 2016 First leg | Panathinaikos | 0–0 | Atromitos | Athens |
| 17:15 (UTC+2) | Abeid (yellow card) 19'; Mesto (yellow card) 41'; Koutroumpis (yellow card) 71' (red card) 88' | Summary | Keita (yellow card) 21'; Bíttolo (yellow card) 30'; Fytanidis (yellow card) 57'; Lazaridis (yellow card) 80' | Stadium: Leoforos Alexandras Stadium; Referee: Milos Styliaras |

| 10 February 2016 Second leg | Atromitos | 1–0 (1–0 agg.) | Panathinaikos | Athens |
| 19:30 (UTC+2) | Le Tallec (yellow card) 36'; Fytanidis (yellow card) 53'; Stojčev 65'; Umbides (yellow card) 86'; Lazaridis (yellow card) 90+4'; Matei (yellow card) 90+5' | Summary | Kaltsas (yellow card) 31'; Essien (yellow card) 47'; Villafáñez (yellow card) 80'; Moledo (yellow card) 88'; Thelander (yellow card) 90+3'; Steele (yellow card) 90+6' | Stadium: Peristeri Stadium; Referee: Christos Mitsios |

=== UEFA Champions League ===
==== Qualifying phase ====
===== Third qualifying round =====
| 28 July 2015 First leg | Panathinaikos (Greece) | 2–1 | (Belgium) Club Brugge | Athens, Greece |
| 21:00 (UTC+3) | Berg 37'; Sánchez (red card) 44'; Karelis 65' (pen.); Pranjić (yellow card) 90' | Report | Bolingoli-Mbombo 10' | Stadium: Leoforos Alexandras Stadium; Attendance: 12,874; Referee: Vladislav Bezborodov (Russia) |

| 5 August 2015 Second leg | Club Brugge (Belgium) | 3–0 (4–2 agg.) | (Greece) Panathinaikos | Bruges, Belgium |
| 21:30 (UTC+3) | Duarte (yellow card) 32'; Cools 53'; Vázquez 58'; Diaby (yellow card) 64'; Óularé 82' | Report | Zeca (yellow card) 42'; Wemmer (yellow card) 45+2'; Tavlaridis (yellow card) 66' | Stadium: Jan Breydel Stadium; Attendance: 27,038; Referee: Stefan Johannesson (Sweden) |

=== UEFA Europa League ===
==== Play-off round ====
| 20 August 2015 First leg | Gabala (Azerbaijan) | 0–0 | (Greece) Panathinaikos | Baku^{2}, Azerbaijan |
| 19:00 (UTC+3) | Santos (yellow card) 49'; Antonov (yellow card) 83' | Report | Zeca (yellow card) 31'; Wemmer (yellow card) 63' | Stadium: Bakcell Arena; Attendance: 10,950; Referee: Andre Marriner (England) |

| 27 August 2015 Second leg | Panathinaikos (Greece) | 2–2 (2–2(a) agg.) | (Azerbaijan) Gabala | Athens, Greece |
| 21:00 (UTC+3) | Berg 35', (yellow card) 40'; Zeca (yellow card) 52'; Nano (yellow card) 73', (goal) 78'; Tavlaridis (yellow card) 90+1' | Report | Dodô 6', 60'; Vernydub (yellow card) 39'; Gai (yellow card) 62'; Ricardinho (yellow card) 78' | Stadium: Leoforos Alexandras Stadium; Attendance: 13,956; Referee: Ivan Kružliak (Slovakia) |

== Squad statistics ==
As of Match played 31 May 2016

=== Appearances and goals ===
| No. | Pos | Nat | Player | Total | | Super League | | Greek Cup | | Europe | | Playoffs | |
| No. | Pos | Nat | Player | Apps | Goals | Apps | Goals | Apps | Goals | Apps | Goals | Apps | Goals |
|---|---|---|---|---|---|---|---|---|---|---|---|---|---|
| 1 | GK | (Greece) GRE | Stefanos Kotsolis | 7 | 0 | 0 | 0 | 5 | 0 | 2 | 0 | 0 | 0 |
| 2 | MF | (Ghana) GHA | Michael Essien | 15 | 1 | 10+2 | 1 | 3 | 0 | 0 | 0 | 0 | 0 |
| 3 | DF | (Greece) GRE | Diamantis Chouchoumis | 4 | 0 | 1 | 0 | 2 | 0 | 0 | 0 | 1 | 0 |
| 4 | DF | (Greece) GRE | Georgios Koutroumpis | 32 | 0 | 15+3 | 0 | 3+1 | 0 | 4 | 0 | 6 | 0 |
| 5 | FW | (Argentina) ARG | Sebastián Leto | 12 | 5 | 4+2 | 2 | 0 | 0 | 0 | 0 | 5+1 | 3 |
| 6 | MF | (Algeria) ALG | Mehdi Abeid | 34 | 4 | 18+5 | 3 | 5+1 | 1 | 0 | 0 | 3+2 | 0 |
| 7 | FW | (Belgium) BEL | Viktor Klonaridis | 24 | 6 | 6+6 | 1 | 5+1 | 4 | 0+2 | 0 | 1+3 | 1 |
| 8 | MF | (Greece) GRE | Anastasios Lagos | 25 | 0 | 9+6 | 0 | 3+3 | 0 | 1+3 | 0 | 0 | 0 |
| 9 | FW | (Sweden) SWE | Marcus Berg | 34 | 19 | 19+3 | 15 | 2+2 | 0 | 3+1 | 2 | 4 | 2 |
| 10 | MF | (Portugal) POR | Zeca | 40 | 0 | 26 | 0 | 4 | 0 | 4 | 0 | 6 | 0 |
| 11 | DF | (Germany) GER | Jens Wemmer | 10 | 0 | 4 | 0 | 2+1 | 0 | 3 | 0 | 0 | 0 |
| 12 | DF | (Greece) GRE | Nikos Marinakis | 17 | 0 | 10+3 | 0 | 3 | 0 | 0 | 0 | 1 | 0 |
| 15 | GK | (England) ENG | Luke Steele | 37 | 0 | 27 | 0 | 2 | 0 | 2 | 0 | 6 | 0 |
| 17 | MF | (Finland) FIN | Robin Lod | 23 | 2 | 8+4 | 0 | 4 | 0 | 1+2 | 0 | 4 | 2 |
| 19 | MF | (Argentina) ARG | Lucas Villafáñez | 12 | 2 | 6+1 | 2 | 1 | 0 | 0 | 0 | 4 | 0 |
| 20 | DF | (Greece) GRE | Stathis Tavlaridis | 26 | 2 | 14+2 | 1 | 3 | 1 | 4 | 0 | 3 | 0 |
| 21 | DF | (Spain) ESP | Nano | 27 | 2 | 15+3 | 1 | 2 | 0 | 2 | 1 | 5 | 0 |
| 23 | MF | (Greece) GRE | Nikos Kaltsas | 27 | 5 | 10+9 | 5 | 3+3 | 0 | 1 | 0 | 0+1 | 0 |
| 24 | DF | (Spain) ESP | Sergio Sánchez | 14 | 0 | 8+2 | 0 | 2 | 0 | 2 | 0 | 0 | 0 |
| 25 | DF | (Denmark) DEN | Rasmus Thelander | 21 | 1 | 18 | 1 | 3 | 0 | 0 | 0 | 0 | 0 |
| 27 | DF | (Italy) ITA | Giandomenico Mesto | 20 | 0 | 12 | 0 | 2 | 0 | 0 | 0 | 5+1 | 0 |
| 28 | DF | (Greece) GRE | Christos Bourbos | 2 | 0 | 1 | 0 | 0 | 0 | 1 | 0 | 0 | 0 |
| 30 | MF | (Cameroon) CMR | Olivier Boumal | 16 | 1 | 3+4 | 1 | 2+1 | 0 | 0 | 0 | 1+5 | 0 |
| 31 | DF | (Brazil) BRA | Rodrigo Moledo | 14 | 2 | 7 | 2 | 1 | 0 | 0 | 0 | 6 | 0 |
| 32 | MF | (Croatia) CRO | Danijel Pranjić | 33 | 0 | 21+2 | 0 | 5+1 | 0 | 4 | 0 | 0 | 0 |
| 33 | FW | (Croatia) CRO | Mladen Petrić | 27 | 5 | 9+9 | 4 | 3+1 | 1 | 1+2 | 0 | 1+1 | 0 |
| 36 | FW | (Greece) GRE | Lazaros Lamprou | 2 | 0 | 0 | 0 | 0+2 | 0 | 0 | 0 | 0 | 0 |
| 45 | GK | (Greece) GRE | Nikos Giannakopoulos | 1 | 0 | 1 | 0 | 0 | 0 | 0 | 0 | 0 | 0 |
| 71 | FW | (Greece) GRE | Panagiotis Vlachodimos | 9 | 1 | 4+1 | 1 | 0+1 | 0 | 0 | 0 | 1+2 | 0 |
| 77 | FW | (Brazil) BRA | Yuri Mamute | 8 | 0 | 2+5 | 0 | 0 | 0 | 0 | 0 | 0+1 | 0 |
| 95 | MF | (Brazil) BRA | Lucas Evangelista | 12 | 1 | 4+4 | 1 | 0+1 | 0 | 0 | 0 | 3 | 0 |
| 99 | GK | (Germany) GER | Odisseas Vlachodimos | 1 | 0 | 1 | 0 | 0 | 0 | 0 | 0 | 0 | 0 |
Players away on loan:
| 14 | MF | (Nigeria) NGR | Abdul Jeleel Ajagun | 14 | 2 | 6+5 | 2 | 1 | 0 | 1+1 | 0 | 0 | 0 |
Players who left Panathinaikos during the season:
| 5 | DF | (Greece) GRE | Konstantinos Triantafyllopoulos | 7 | 0 | 2+1 | 0 | 2 | 0 | 1+1 | 0 | 0 | 0 |
| 19 | FW | (Greece) GRE | Nikos Karelis | 22 | 9 | 14+1 | 8 | 1+2 | 0 | 4 | 1 | 0 | 0 |
| 29 | MF | (Greece) GRE | Sotiris Ninis | 13 | 1 | 4+3 | 0 | 3 | 1 | 3 | 0 | 0 | 0 |

=== Goal scorers ===
| Place | Position | Nation | Number | Name | Super League | Greek Cup | Europe | Playoffs | Total |
|---|---|---|---|---|---|---|---|---|---|
| 1 | FW | (Sweden) | 9 | Marcus Berg | 15 | 0 | 2 | 2 | 19 |
| 2 | FW | (Greece) | 19 | Nikos Karelis | 8 | 0 | 1 | 0 | 9 |
| 3 | FW | (Belgium) | 7 | Viktor Klonaridis | 1 | 4 | 0 | 1 | 6 |
| 4 | MF | (Greece) | 23 | Nikos Kaltsas | 5 | 0 | 0 | 0 | 5 |
| 4 | FW | (Croatia) | 33 | Mladen Petrić | 4 | 1 | 0 | 0 | 5 |
| 4 | FW | (Argentina) | 5 | Sebastián Leto | 2 | 0 | 0 | 3 | 5 |
| 7 | MF | (Algeria) | 6 | Mehdi Abeid | 3 | 1 | 0 | 0 | 4 |
| 8 | MF | (Nigeria) | 14 | Abdul Jeleel Ajagun | 2 | 0 | 0 | 0 | 2 |
| 8 | DF | (Brazil) | 31 | Rodrigo Moledo | 2 | 0 | 0 | 0 | 2 |
| 8 | MF | (Argentina) | 19 | Lucas Villafáñez | 2 | 0 | 0 | 0 | 2 |
| 8 | DF | (Greece) | 20 | Stathis Tavlaridis | 1 | 1 | 0 | 0 | 2 |
| 8 | DF | (Spain) | 21 | Nano | 1 | 0 | 1 | 0 | 2 |
| 8 | MF | (Finland) | 17 | Robin Lod | 0 | 0 | 0 | 2 | 2 |
| 14 | DF | (Denmark) | 25 | Rasmus Thelander | 1 | 0 | 0 | 0 | 1 |
| 14 | MF | (Cameroon) | 30 | Olivier Boumal | 1 | 0 | 0 | 0 | 1 |
| 14 | MF | (Ghana) | 2 | Michael Essien | 1 | 0 | 0 | 0 | 1 |
| 14 | FW | (Greece) | 71 | Panagiotis Vlachodimos | 1 | 0 | 0 | 0 | 1 |
| 14 | MF | (Brazil) | 95 | Lucas Evangelista | 1 | 0 | 0 | 0 | 1 |
| 14 | | | | Own goal | 1 | 0 | 0 | 0 | 1 |
| 14 | MF | (Greece) | 29 | Sotiris Ninis | 0 | 1 | 0 | 0 | 1 |
| | | | | TOTALS | 52 | 8 | 4 | 8 | 72 |

=== Disciplinary record ===
| Number | Nation | Position | Name | Super League | | Greek Cup | | Europe | | Playoffs | | Total | |
| Number | Nation | Position | Name | Yellow card | Red card | Yellow card | Red card | Yellow card | Red card | Yellow card | Red card | Yellow card | Red card |
| 2 | (Ghana) | MF | Michael Essien | 0 | 0 | 1 | 0 | 0 | 0 | 0 | 0 | 1 | 0 |
| 3 | (Greece) | DF | Diamantis Chouchoumis | 0 | 0 | 0 | 0 | 0 | 0 | 1 | 0 | 1 | 0 |
| 4 | (Greece) | DF | Georgios Koutroumpis | 0 | 0 | 2 | 1 | 0 | 0 | 1 | 0 | 3 | 1 |
| 5 | (Argentina) | FW | Sebastián Leto | 0 | 0 | 0 | 0 | 0 | 0 | 1 | 0 | 1 | 0 |
| 6 | (Algeria) | MF | Mehdi Abeid | 0 | 0 | 1 | 0 | 0 | 0 | 1 | 0 | 2 | 0 |
| 7 | (Belgium) | FW | Viktor Klonaridis | 0 | 0 | 0 | 0 | 0 | 0 | 2 | 0 | 2 | 0 |
| 8 | (Greece) | MF | Anastasios Lagos | 0 | 0 | 1 | 0 | 0 | 0 | 0 | 0 | 1 | 0 |
| 9 | (Sweden) | FW | Marcus Berg | 0 | 0 | 1 | 0 | 1 | 0 | 2 | 0 | 4 | 0 |
| 10 | (Portugal) | MF | Zeca | 0 | 0 | 0 | 0 | 3 | 0 | 1 | 0 | 4 | 0 |
| 11 | (Germany) | DF | Jens Wemmer | 0 | 0 | 1 | 0 | 2 | 0 | 0 | 0 | 3 | 0 |
| 15 | (England) | GK | Luke Steele | 0 | 0 | 1 | 0 | 0 | 0 | 0 | 0 | 1 | 0 |
| 17 | (Finland) | MF | Robin Lod | 0 | 0 | 1 | 0 | 0 | 0 | 1 | 0 | 2 | 0 |
| 19 | (Argentina) | MF | Lucas Villafáñez | 0 | 0 | 1 | 0 | 0 | 0 | 0 | 1 | 1 | 1 |
| 20 | (Greece) | DF | Stathis Tavlaridis | 0 | 0 | 0 | 0 | 2 | 0 | 1 | 0 | 3 | 0 |
| 21 | (Spain) | DF | Nano | 0 | 0 | 0 | 0 | 1 | 0 | 1 | 0 | 2 | 0 |
| 23 | (Greece) | MF | Nikos Kaltsas | 0 | 0 | 1 | 0 | 0 | 0 | 1 | 0 | 2 | 0 |
| 24 | (Spain) | DF | Sergio Sánchez | 0 | 0 | 0 | 0 | 1 | 0 | 0 | 0 | 1 | 0 |
| 25 | (Denmark) | DF | Rasmus Thelander | 0 | 0 | 1 | 0 | 0 | 0 | 0 | 0 | 1 | 0 |
| 27 | (Italy) | DF | Giandomenico Mesto | 0 | 0 | 1 | 0 | 0 | 0 | 2 | 0 | 3 | 0 |
| 31 | (Brazil) | DF | Rodrigo Moledo | 0 | 0 | 1 | 0 | 0 | 0 | 1 | 0 | 2 | 0 |
| 32 | (Croatia) | MF | Danijel Pranjić | 0 | 0 | 1 | 0 | 1 | 0 | 0 | 0 | 2 | 0 |
| 95 | (Brazil) | FW | Lucas Evangelista | 0 | 0 | 0 | 0 | 0 | 0 | 1 | 0 | 1 | 0 |
| | | | TOTALS | 0 | 0 | 15 | 1 | 10 | 1 | 17 | 1 | 42 | 3 |
