= 2017–18 Panathinaikos F.C. season =

Panathinaikos
2017–18 season
- Chairman: Giannis Alafouzos
- Manager: Marinos Ouzounidis
- Stadium: Leoforos Alexandras Stadium
- Super League Greece: 11th
- Greek Cup: Round of 16
- UEFA Europa League: Play-off round
- Top goalscorer: League: Robin Lod, Lucas Villafáñez (5); All: Guillermo Molins, Robin Lod (7)
- Highest home attendance: 13,715
- Lowest home attendance: 2,077
Home colours	Away colours	Third colours

The 2017–18 Panathinaikos season is the club's 59th consecutive season in Super League Greece. They are also competing in the Greek Cup.

== Players ==
No.	Name	Nationality	Position (s)	Date of birth (age)	Signed from	Notes
Goalkeepers
1	Sokratis Dioudis	(Greece)	GK	3 February 1993 (24)	(Greece) Aris	
27	Konstantinos Kotsaris	(Greece)	GK	25 July 1996 (21)	Youth system	
99	Odisseas Vlachodimos	(Greece)	GK	26 April 1994 (23)	(Germany) VfB Stuttgart	
Defenders
2	Mattias Johansson	(Sweden)	RB / RM	16 February 1992 (25)	(Netherlands) Alkmaar	
3	Emanuel Insúa	(Argentina)	LB / LM	10 April 1991 (26)	(Italy) Udinese	
15	Anastasios Avlonitis	(Greece)	CB	1 January 1990 (27)	(Greece) Olympiacos	
20	Evangelos Ikonomou	(Greece)	CB / LB	18 July 1987 (30)	Panionios	
26	Dimitrios Kolovetsios	(Greece)	CB	16 October 1991 (25)	(Greece) AEK Athens	
41	Stefanos Evangelou	(Greece)	CB	12 May 1998 (19)	(Greece) Panionios	
78	Ousmane Coulibaly	(Mali)	RB / LB	9 July 1989 (age 27)	(Greece) Platanias	
Midfielders
5	Ergys Kaçe	(Albania)	DM	8 July 1993 (24)	PAOK	
6	Christos Donis	(Greece)	CM	9 October 1994 (22)	Youth system	
7	Omri Altman	(Israel)	W / F	23 March 1994 (23)	(Israel) Hapoel Tel Aviv	
17	Robin Lod	(Finland)	CM	17 April 1993 (24)	(Finland) HJK Helsinki	
22	Theofanis Tzandaris	(Greece)	DM	13 June 1993 (age 24)	(Greece) Olympiacos	
34	Paschalis Staikos	(Greece)	CM / DM	8 February 1996 (21)	Youth system	
39	Anastasios Chatzigiovannis	(Greece)	RW / LW	31 May 1997 (20)	Youth system	
Forwards
8	Guillermo Molins	(Sweden)	W / F	26 September 1988 (age 29)	(China) Beijing Renhe	
9	Giannis Mystakidis	(Greece)	ST	7 December 1994 (23)	PAOK	
10	Anthony Mounier	(France)	RW / LW	27 September 1987 (29)	(Italy) Bologna	
18	Luciano	(Brazil)	CF	18 May 1993 (24)	(Brazil) Corinthians	
49	Sotiris-Pantelis Pispas	(Greece)	CF	19 January 1998 (19)	Youth system	

== Transfers ==
=== In ===
==== Summer ====
No.	Pos.	Nation	Player
1	(Greece)	GK	Sokratis Dioudis (from Aris)
2	(Sweden)	DF	Mattias Johansson (from (Netherlands) AZ)
3	(Argentina)	DF	Emanuel Insúa (from (Italy) Udinese)
7	(Israel)	MF	Omri Altman (from (Israel) Hapoel Tel Aviv)
9	(Argentina)	FW	Andrés Chávez (from (Argentina) Boca Juniors)
10	(France)	MF	Anthony Mounier (from (Italy) Bologna)
11	(Ecuador)	FW	Bryan Cabezas (on loan from (Italy) Atalanta)
14	(Sweden)	MF	Oscar Hiljemark (on loan from (Italy) Genoa)
18	(Brazil)	FW	Luciano (on loan from (Brazil) Corinthians)
22	(Greece)	MF	Theofanis Tzandaris (from Olympiacos)
26	(Greece)	DF	Dimitrios Kolovetsios (from AEK Athens)
29	(Mali)	MF	Yacouba Sylla (on loan from (France) Rennais)

==== Winter ====
No.	Pos.	Nation	Player
5	MF	ALB	Ergys Kaçe (on loan from PAOK)
9	FW	GRE	Giannis Mystakidis (on loan from PAOK)
18	FW	BRA	Luciano (from (Brazil) Corinthians, previously on loan)
20	DF	GRE	Evangelos Ikonomou (from Panionios)

=== Out ===
==== Summer ====
No.	Pos.	Nation	Player
--	(Nigeria)	MF	Abdul Ajagun (to (Belgium) Kortrijk)
--	(Greece)	DF	Konstantinos Valmas (on loan to Kallithea)
--	(Greece)	DF	Georgios Servilakis (to Kissamikos)
1	(Greece)	GK	Stefanos Kotsolis (released)
3	(Greece)	DF	Diamantis Chouchoumis (released)
7	(Cameroon)	MF	Olivier Boumal (to (China) Liaoning)
9	(Sweden)	FW	Marcus Berg (to (United Arab Emirates) Al Ain)
10	(Portugal)	MF	Zeca (to (Denmark) Copenhagen)
11	(Argentina)	FW	Sebastián Leto (to (United Arab Emirates) Emirates Club)
12	(Greece)	DF	Nikos Marinakis (to Panetolikos)
14	(Belgium)	FW	Viktor Klonaridis (loan return to (France) Lens)
15	(England)	GK	Luke Steele (to (England) Bristol City)
22	(Ghana)	MF	Mubarak Wakaso (to (Spain) Deportivo Alavés)
27	(Italy)	DF	Giandomenico Mesto (released)
37	(Greece)	MF	Georgios Angelopoulos (on loan to Ergotelis)
38	(Greece)	MF	Theodoros Mingos (on loan to Kallithea)
40	(Democratic Republic of the Congo)	MF	Paul-José M'Poku (loan return to (Italy) Chievo)
45	(Greece)	GK	Nikos Giannakopoulos (to Kerkyra)
71	(Greece)	MF	Panagiotis Vlachodimos (to (France) Nîmes)

==== Winter ====
No.	Pos.	Nation	Player
4	DF	GRE	Georgios Koutroumpis (to (Belgium) Standard Liège)
5	DF	POR	Nuno Reis (to (Portugal) Vitória Setúbal)
9	FW	ARG	Andrés Chávez (to (Argentina) Huracán)
11	FW	ECU	Bryan Cabezas (loan return to (Italy) Atalanta)
14	MF	SWE	Oscar Hiljemark (loan return to (Italy) Genoa)
19	MF	ARG	Lucas Villafáñez (to (Turkey) Alanyaspor)
23	DF	SWE	Niklas Hult (to AEK Athens)
29	MF	MLI	Yacouba Sylla (loan return to (France) Rennais)

== Competitions ==
=== Super League Greece ===
==== League table ====
Pos	Team	Pld	W	D	L	GF	GA	GD	Pts
9	PAS Giannina	30	7	13	10	31	34	−3	34 (Note: Head-to-head points: Levadiakos 2, PAS Giannina 2.)
10	Levadiakos	30	8	10	12	23	34	−11	34
11	Panathinaikos	30	10	10	10	30	30	0	32 (Note: Panathinaikos were deducted 2 points due to crowd behavior against PAOK in a play-off match during the 2016–17 season. Panathinaikos were deducted 3 points for financial reasons on 11 April 2018. On 23 April 2018 another 3 points were deducted for the same occasion.)
12	AEL	30	7	10	13	22	41	−19	31
13	Lamia	30	6	12	12	20	34	−14	30

Source: Super League Greece
Rules for classification: 1) Points; 2) Head-to-head points; 3) Head-to-head goal difference; 4) Goals scored; 5) Goals against; 6) Play-offs (neutral ground); 7) Draw.
(Note: Criteria 6 is only used if needed to decide champion, teams for relegation or teams for UEFA competitions).

==== Matches ====
Win Draw Loss Postponed

20 August 2017 1	Platanias	1–1	Panathinaikos	Chania
21:30	Korovesis 78'	Report	Chávez 72'	Stadium: Perivolia Municipal Stadium; Attendance: 1,879; Referee: Anastasios Papapetrou

27 August 2017 2	Panathinaikos	0–0	Levadiakos	Athens
19:15		Report		Stadium: Leoforos Alexandras Stadium; Attendance: Behind closed doors Referee: Aristotelis Diamantopoulos

10 September 2017 3	Kerkyra	1–0	Panathinaikos	Kerkyra
20:30	Epstein 18' (pen.)	Report		Stadium: Kerkyra Stadium; Attendance: 1,748; Referee: Ioannis Papadopoulos

17 September 2017 4	Panathinaikos	1–0	Apollon Smyrnis	Athens
16:00	Altman 32'	Report		Stadium: Leoforos Alexandras Stadium; Attendance: 4,391; Referee: Alexandros Katsikogiannis

23 September 2017 5	Panetolikos	2–0	Panathinaikos	Agrinio
20:30	Mazurek 19'; Clésio 65'	Report		Stadium: Panetolikos Stadium; Attendance: 3,721; Referee: Georgios Kominis

30 September 2017 6	Panathinaikos	2–0	PAS Giannina	Athens
18:15	Michail 11' (o.g.); Molins 13'	Report		Stadium: Leoforos Alexandras Stadium; Attendance: 10,620; Referee: Emmanouil Skoulas

16 October 2017 7	Panathinaikos	2–1	AEL	Athens
19:30	Villafanez 50' (pen.); Hiljemark 90+3'	Report	Perrone 78'	Stadium: Leoforos Alexandras Stadium; Attendance: 7,555; Referee: Aristomenis Koutsiaftis

21 October 2017 8	Lamia	1–1	Panathinaikos	Lamia
20:30	Hult 37'	Report	Molins 85'	Stadium: Lamia Municipal Stadium; Attendance: 3,836; Referee: Praxitelis Zahariadis

28 October 2017 9	Panathinaikos	1–0	Olympiacos	Athens
19:30	Villafáñez 56'	Report		Stadium: Leoforos Alexandras Stadium; Attendance: 13,715; Referee: Anastasios Papapetrou

4 November 2017 10	Asteras Tripolis	1–0	Panathinaikos	Tripoli
19:30	Munafo 86'	Report		Stadium: Theodoros Kolokotronis Stadium; Attendance: 3,907; Referee: Georgios Kominis

19 November 2017 11	Panathinaikos	1–1	AEK Athens	Athens
19:30	Moledo 10'	Report	Livaja 90+5'	Stadium: Leoforos Alexandras Stadium; Attendance: 8,734; Referee: Charalampos Kalogeropoulos

25 November 2017 12	Atromitos	1–1	Panathinaikos	Athens
19:30	Dauda 3'	Report	Molins 30' (pen.)	Stadium: Peristeri Stadium; Attendance: 1,559; Referee: Stavros Mandalos

3 December 2017 13	Panathinaikos	0–1	Panionios	Athens
15:00		Report	Durmishaj 73'	Stadium: Leoforos Alexandras Stadium; Attendance: 8,045; Referee: Athanassios Tzilos

10 December 2017 14	PAOK	4–0	Panathinaikos	Thessaloniki
19:30	Pelkas 8', 51'; Koulouris 67' (pen.); Prijović 77'	Report		Stadium: Toumba Stadium; Attendance: 26,140; Referee: Dimitrios Styliaras

17 December 2017 15	Xanthi	1–1	Panathinaikos	Xanthi
19:30	Jendrišek 79'	Report	Altman 18'	Stadium: Xanthi FC Arena; Attendance: 1,806; Referee: Dimitrios Karantonis

7 January 2018 16	Panathinaikos	2–0	Platanias	Athens
15:00	Villafanez 72' (pen.), 90+2' (pen.)	Report		Stadium: Leoforos Alexandras Stadium; Attendance: 6,479; Referee: Praxitelis Zahariadis

14 January 2018 17	Levadiakos	3–2	Panathinaikos	Livadeia
19:30	Favaro 22'; Youssouf 36'; Mitropoulos 50'	Report	Lod 76'; Villafanez 90+4' (pen.)	Stadium: Levadia Municipal Stadium; Attendance: 1,019; Referee: Angelos Evangelou

20 January 2018 18	Panathinaikos	4–0	Kerkyra	Athens
17:15	Donis 16'; Johansson 33'; Lod 70'; Altman 90'	Report		Stadium: Leoforos Alexandras Stadium; Attendance: 4,900; Referee: Georgios Blanas

27 January 2018 19	Apollon Smyrnis	0–0	Panathinaikos	Athens
17:15		Report		Stadium: Georgios Kamaras Stadium; Attendance: 1,710; Referee: Aristidis Vatsios

3 February 2018 20	Panathinaikos	0–0	Panetolikos	Athens
19:30		Report		Stadium: Leoforos Alexandras Stadium; Attendance: 5,589; Referee: Athanassios Tzilos

10 February 2018 21	PAS Giannina	2–1	Panathinaikos	Ioannina
19:30	Conde 30', 45+1'	Report	Garoufalias 69' (o.g.)	Stadium: Zosimades Stadium; Attendance: 2,374; Referee: Anastasios Sidiropoulos

19 February 2018 22	AEL	0–1	Panathinaikos	Larissa
19:30		Report	Lod 19'	Stadium: AEL FC Arena; Attendance: 4,584; Referee: Dimitrios Styliaras

24 February 2018 23	Panathinaikos	2–0	Lamia	Athens
19:30	Mounier 48'; Insúa 64'	Report		Stadium: Leoforos Alexandras Stadium; Attendance: 3,505; Referee: Dimitrios Karantonis

4 March 2018 24	Olympiacos	1–1	Panathinaikos	Piraeus
19:30	Fortounis 62'	Report	Mounier 87'	Stadium: Karaiskakis Stadium; Attendance: Behind closed doors Referee: Angelos Evangelou

10 March 2018 25	Panathinaikos	1–1	Asteras Tripolis	Athens
19:30	Lod 87'	Report	Manias 69'	Stadium: Leoforos Alexandras Stadium; Attendance: 8,865; Referee: Emmanouil Skoulas

1 April 2018 26	AEK Athens	3–0	Panathinaikos	Athens
19:30	Araujo 30', 68'; Galo 52'	Report		Stadium: Olympic Stadium; Attendance: 27,106; Referee: Dimitrios Thanos

15 April 2018 27	Panathinaikos	1–0	Atromitos	Athens
17:15	Mounier 58' (pen.)	Report		Stadium: Leoforos Alexandras Stadium; Attendance: 4,147; Referee: Alexandros Katsikogiannis

22 April 2018 28	Panionios	0–3	Panathinaikos	Athens
19:00		Report	Luciano 35'; Lod 38'; Molins 87'	Stadium: Nea Smyrni Stadium; Attendance: 1,909; Referee: Anastasios Sidiropoulos

29 April 2018 29	Panathinaikos	0–3	PAOK	Athens
19:00		Report	Prijović 27', 65'; Shakhov 84'	Stadium: Leoforos Alexandras Stadium; Attendance: 8,649; Referee: Athanasios Tzilos

7 May 2018 30	Panathinaikos	1–2	Xanthi	Athens
19:00	Luciano 11'	Report	Casado 44'; Đuričković 66'	Stadium: Leoforos Alexandras Stadium; Attendance: 2,077; Referee: Dimitrios Styliaras

=== Greek Cup ===
==== Group stage ====
Pos	Team	Pld	W	D	L	GF	GA	GD	Pts	Qualification
1	Panathinaikos	3	2	1	0	5	2	+3	7	Round of 16
2	AEL	3	1	1	1	3	2	+1	4	Round of 16
3	Panachaiki	3	1	1	1	2	4	−2	4	
4	Anagennisi Karditsa	3	0	1	2	1	3	−2	1	

Source: epo.gr
Rules for classification: 1) points, 2) head-to-head points, 3) head-to-head goal difference, 4) head-to-head best offense, 5) overall goal difference, 6) overall best offense, 7) overall best defense.

20 September 2017 Matchday 1	Panathinaikos	2–0	AEL	Ampelokipoi
20:30 EEST	Chávez 18'; Molins 90+4'	Report		Stadium: Leoforos Alexandras Stadium; Referee: Praxitelis Zachariadis (Macedonia)

24 October 2017 Matchday 2	Anagennisi Karditsa	1–2	Panathinaikos	Karditsa
17:15 EEST	Plavoukos 14'	Report	Mounier 51'; Molins 90+1'	Stadium: Municipal Stadium of Karditsa; Referee: Giorgos Tzovaras (Phthiotis)

29 November 2017 Matchday 3	Panachaiki	1–1	Panathinaikos	Patras
19:30 EET	Argyropoulos 40' (pen.)	Report	Hiljemark 29'	Stadium: Kostas Davourlis Stadium; Attendance: 5,000; Referee: Georgios Blanas (Messinia)

==== Round of 16 ====
21 December 2017 First leg	Lamia	4–1	Panathinaikos	Lamia
17:15	Piti 5', 45'; Panteliadis 42'; Blažić 90'	Report	Molins 82'	Stadium: Lamia Municipal Stadium; Referee: Alexandros Aretopoulos (Trikala)

10 January 2018 Second leg	Panathinaikos	1–0 (2–4 agg.)	Lamia	Ampelokipoi
19:30	Mounier 73'	Report		Stadium: Leoforos Alexandras Stadium; Referee: Giorgos Kominis (Thesprotia)

=== UEFA Europa League ===
==== Qualifying phase ====
===== Third qualifying round =====
27 July 2017 First leg	Panathinaikos (Greece)	1–0	(Azerbaijan) Gabala	Athens
20:30	Molins 37' (pen.)	Report		Stadium: Leoforos Alexandras Stadium; Attendance: 11,237; Referee: Juan Martínez Munuera (Spain)

3 August 2017 Second leg	Gabala (Azerbaijan)	1–2 (1–3 agg.)	(Greece) Panathinaikos	Baku
19:00	Moledo 52' (o.g.)	Report	Lod 63'; Cabezas 66'	Stadium: Bakcell Arena; Attendance: 11,000; Referee: Craig Pawson (England)

===== Play-off round =====
17 August 2017 First leg	Panathinaikos (Greece)	2–3	(Spain) Athletic Bilbao	Athens
20:30	Lod 29'; Cabezas 55'	Report	Aduriz 68', 74' (pen.); De Marcos 71'	Stadium: Leoforos Alexandras Stadium; Attendance: 15,000; Referee: Jorge Sousa (Portugal)

24 August 2017 Second leg	Athletic Bilbao (Spain)	1–0 (4–2 agg.)	(Greece) Panathinaikos	Bilbao
20:45	Muniain 22'	Report		Stadium: San Mamés; Referee: Benoît Bastien (France)
