= Wemmer (surname) =

Wemmer is a surname of German origin. Notable people with the surname include:

- Jens Wemmer (born 1985), German footballer
- Jörn Wemmer (born 1984), German footballer
