= Abdul Jeleel Ajagun =

Nigerian footballer (born 1993)

Personal information
- Full name: Abdul Jeleel Ajagun
- Date of birth: 10 February 1993 (age 33)
- Place of birth: Port Harcourt, Nigeria
- Height: 1.68 m (5 ft 6 in)
- Position: Attacking midfielder

Team information
- Current team: Al-Faisaly
- Number: 36

Youth career
- 2003–2009: Dolphins

Senior career*
Years	Team	Apps	(Gls)
2009–2013	Dolphins	92	(39)
2013–2017	Panathinaikos	67	(10)
2016	→ Levadiakos (loan)	12	(0)
2016–2017	→ Roda JC (loan)	31	(5)
2017–2020	Kortrijk	58	(7)
2019	→ Omonia (loan)	11	(0)
2020–2022	Cape Town City	11	(4)
2022–2023	Al-Hilal Club	15	(0)
2023–2025	Al-Hussein		
2025–	Al-Faisaly	11	(0)

International career
2009–2010	Nigeria U17	7	(2)
2010–2014	Nigeria U20	22	(12)
- * Club domestic league appearances and goals as of 2 February 2026

Abdul Jeleel Ajagun(born 10 February 1993) is a Nigerian professional footballer who plays as an attacking midfielder for Jordanian Pro League club Al-Faisaly.

== Club career ==
Ajagun is a youth product of the Nigerian's Dolphins F.C.

On 28 August 2013, Panathinaikos announced Ajagun signed a contract for four years with the club. On his debut with Panathinaikos, he scored against Platanias.

On 30 July 2015, Ajagun helped Greek club Panathinaikos come from behind to beat visiting Club Brugge of Belgium 2–1 in a UEFA Champions League qualifying round. Panathinaikos fell behind in front of their fans after just 10 minutes, but they showed great character to come back and win with two goals, one in each half. And that was after they had defender Sergio Sanchez sent off two minutes from halftime and also missed a penalty in the 34th minute. Ajagun was replaced in the 46th minute on account of the red card against his team. Ajagun scored for his Greek side Panathinaikos in his first league game of the 2015–16 season as they beat Levadiakos by 3–0. On 29 January 2015, Panathinaikos announced that 23-year-old Nigerian midfielder Abdul Ajagun will continue his career at Levadiakos on loan until the end of season. Ajagun was not in manager's Andrea Stramaccioni plans and his departure would free a foreigner's position, in order for the Greens to complete Lucas Villafanez and Rodrigo Moledo's transfers.

On 14 July 2016, Roda announced the signing of former Nigeria youth international on season-long loan with a view to a permanent move. Ajagun, who played under the Miners boss Yannis Anastasiou will be hoping to make his mark in the Dutch elite division. On 15 April 2017, he scored a brace in a vital game against Sparta Rotterdam sealing a 3–1 home win in his club's effort to avoid relegation. On 7 May 2017, he scored at the last minute of the vital home game against Willem II sealing a 1–0 win but despite the win, the team from Kerkrade kept fighting Sparta Rotterdam and NEC for a chance to direct self-preservation, with one game remaining for the end of the season.

On 5 July 2017, Ajagun moved to Kortrijk on coach Yannis Anastasiou's recommendation, as Panathinaikos announced officially. It has long been known to be official, that the Nigerian footballer was not in the plans of Panathinaikos manager Marinos Ouzounidis after returning from his long season loan to Roda. On 17 September 2017, he scored his first goal with the club in a 2–2 home draw against Anderlecht.

== Career statistics ==
As of match played on 21 May 2019

Appearances and goals by club, season and competition
Club	Season	League			Cup		Other		Total	
Club	Season	Division	Apps	Goals	Apps	Goals	Apps	Goals	Apps	Goals
Panathinaikos	2013–14	Super League Greece	27	4	5	2	0	0	32	6
Panathinaikos	2014–15	Super League Greece	28	4	3	1	8 (Note: Six appearances in UEFA Europa League, Two appearances in UEFA Champions League)	1	39	6
Panathinaikos	2015–16	Super League Greece	12	2	1	0	2 (Note: One appearance in both UEFA Champions League and UEFA Europa League)	0	15	2
Panathinaikos	Total		67	10	9	3	10	1	86	14
Levadiakos (loan)	2015–16	Super League Greece	12	0	0	0	0	0	12	0
Roda JC (loan)	2016–17	Eredivisie	31	5	1	0	4 (Note: Appearances in Promotion/relegation play-offs)	0	36	5
Kortrijk	2017–18	Belgian First Division A	36	6	5	3	0	0	41	9
Kortrijk	2018–19	Belgian First Division A	8	0	3	0	0	0	11	0
Kortrijk	Total		44	6	8	3	0	0	52	9
AC Omonia (loan)	2018–19	Cypriot First Division	11	0	1	0	0	0	12	0
Career totals			165	21	19	6	14	1	198	28

== International career ==
He was a member of the Nigeria national under-17 football team that placed second in the 2009 edition they hosted, and scored two goals. He has played in two African Youth Championships with the Nigeria under-20 team. He captained the squad in 2013 as they placed third to qualify for the 2013 Under-20 World Cup in Turkey.

On 21 June 2013, Ajagun scored two goals in their 3–2 defeat to Portugal in their opening game of the 2013 U-20 World Cup.

== Honours ==
=== Club ===
Dolphins

- Nigeria Premier League: 2010–11

Panathinaikos

- Greek Cup: 2013–14

=== Country ===
Under-20

- African Youth Championship: 2011; Third Place: 2013
