= Boumal =

Boumal is a surname. Notable people with the surname include:

- Olivier Boumal (born 1989), Cameroonian footballer
- Petrus Boumal (born 1993), Cameroonian footballer
