= Efthymis =

Efthymis and Efthimis are given names. People with the given names include:

== Efthymis ==
- Efthymis Koulouris
- Efthymis Argyropoulos
- Efthymis Christopoulos
- Efthymis Kouloucheris

== Efthimis ==
- Efthimis Bakatsias
- Efthimis Filippou
- Efthimis Kioumourtzoglou
