= Zeca (footballer, born 1988) =

Greek footballer (born 1988)

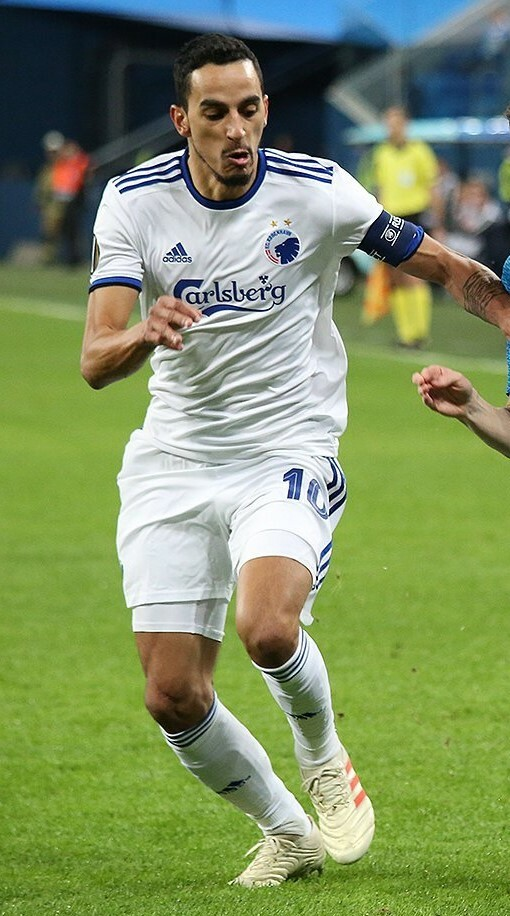
- Zeca with Copenhagen in 2018

Personal information
- Full name: José Carlos Gonçalves Rodrigues
- Date of birth: 31 August 1988 (age 38)
- Place of birth: Lisbon, Portugal
- Height: 1.82 m (6 ft 0 in)
- Position: Midfielder

Team information
- Current team: Panathinaikos (assistant)

Youth career
- 1998–2007: Casa Pia

Senior career*
Years	Team	Apps	(Gls)
2007–2010	Casa Pia	46	(5)
2010–2011	Vitória Setúbal	26	(0)
2011–2017	Panathinaikos	165	(8)
2017–2023	Copenhagen	140	(8)
2023–2025	Panathinaikos	16	(0)
2023	Panathinaikos B	1	(0)
Total		394	(21)

International career
2011	Portugal U23	1	(0)
2017–2023	Greece	34	(2)
- * Club domestic league appearances and goals

José Carlos Gonçalves Rodrigues (Greek: Ζοζέ Κάρλος Γκονσάλβες Ροντρίγκες; born 31 August 1988), commonly known as Zeca (Greek: Ζέκα), is a former professional footballer who played as a midfielder.

He spent most of his career in Greece with Panathinaikos after starting out at Casa Pia, appearing in 275 competitive matches for the former club in two spells and winning the 2014 Greek Cup. In 2017, he signed with Copenhagen.

Born in Portugal, Zeca became a Greek citizen in March 2017 and started representing its national team the same year.

== Club career ==
=== Vitória Setúbal ===
Born in Lisbon, Zeca started his career with local Casa Pia, joining the club's youth system at the age of 10 and promoting to the fourth division in his first season as a senior. In summer 2010 he moved straight into the Primeira Liga, signing with Vitória de Setúbal.

During his only season with the Sado River team, Zeca made 26 league appearances, appearing in as many games as a starter or a substitute and totalling 1,611 minutes of action.

=== Panathinaikos ===
Zeca signed a four-year contract with Greek side Panathinaikos on 29 July 2011 for a fee of €400,000, as the club was coached by countryman Jesualdo Ferreira. He played all 30 league games in 2012–13, but the Clover could only finish in sixth place. After a massive rebuilding for the following campaign, he was one of the few survivors.

After more than 100 appearances with the club, on 26 April 2014 Zeca lifted the Greek Cup as team captain, in a final against PAOK at the Olympic Stadium in Athens. On 21 June, he signed a three-year extension.

In February 2015, Zeca expressed his desire to play for the Greece national team if he was awarded the country's citizenship. He agreed to renew his contract until 2018 two months later, commenting on the deal: "It will be good to continue with Anastasiou in charge. ... The team is happy and I think we can do a lot better under him".

On 6 February 2016, Andrea Stramaccioni's team ended the match with ten players as Zeca was shown a straight red card in a 0–1 home loss against Skoda Xanthi. Eight days later, after returning from suspension, he again received his marching orders, but in an eventual 3–0 away victory over PAS Giannina.

Zeca extended his contract on 9 August 2016, until the summer of 2019 for an undisclosed fee.

=== Copenhagen ===
On 28 August 2017, Panathinaikos reached a formal agreement with Copenhagen for Zeca's transfer to the Danish club, for a fee believed to be in the region of €1.5 million; the player signed a four-year deal, with an annual salary of €1 million. On his debut, on 9 September, he scored in a 4–3 home defeat of Midtjylland.

On 6 November 2019, after helping the team win the Superliga for the fifth time in the decade, Zeca renewed his contract until 30 June 2023. On 3 October 2021, he suffered a cruciate ligament injury in a game against Viborg that sidelined him for several months; he still contributed relatively as they conquered the domestic league again.

Zeca was again seriously injured in the knee in October 2022.

=== Return to Panathinaikos ===
On 23 May 2023, aged 34, Zeca returned to Panathinaikos on a two-year contract. After retiring, he remained at the club as team manager first and assistant coach later.

== International career ==
Having completed five years of residence and professional status in Greece, Zeca became eligible for its citizenship in the beginning of 2017. He passed the relevant language and history exams in November 2016, becoming available for national side manager Michael Skibbe in the middle of the 2018 FIFA World Cup qualification campaign. He earned his first cap on 25 March 2017, coming on as a late substitute in a 1–1 away draw against Belgium; in the return match, on 3 September of that year, he scored his first goal in a 1–2 loss in Piraeus.

== Career statistics ==
=== Club ===
Appearances and goals by club, season and competition
Club	Season	League			National cup (Note: Includes Taça de Portugal, Greek Football Cup, Danish Cup)		League cup (Note: Includes Taça da Liga)		Europe		Other		Total	
Club	Season	Division	Apps	Goals	Apps	Goals	Apps	Goals	Apps	Goals	Apps	Goals	Apps	Goals
Vitória Setúbal	2010–11	Primeira Liga	26	0	3	1	2	0	–		–		31	1
Panathinaikos	2011–12	Super League Greece	27	2	2	0	–		2 (Note: Appearances in UEFA Europa League)	0	5 (Note: Appearances in Super League Greece play-offs)	0	36	2
Panathinaikos	2012–13	Super League Greece	30	4	2	0	–		10 (Note: Four appearances in UEFA Champions League, six appearances and one goal in UEFA Europa League)	1	–		42	5
Panathinaikos	2013–14	Super League Greece	27	0	8	0	–		–		6	0	41	0
Panathinaikos	2014–15	Super League Greece	29	2	2	0	–		8 (Note: Two appearances in UEFA Champions League, six appearances in UEFA Europa League)	0	5	0	44	2
Panathinaikos	2015–16	Super League Greece	27	0	4	0	–		4 (Note: Two appearances in UEFA Champions League, two appearances in UEFA Europa League)	0	6	0	41	0
Panathinaikos	2016–17	Super League Greece	23	0	3	0	–		9	0	4	0	39	0
Panathinaikos	2017–18	Super League Greece	2	0	0	0	–		4	0	–		6	0
Panathinaikos	Total		165	8	21	0	–		37	1	26	0	249	9
Copenhagen	2017–18	Danish Superliga	27	2	1	0	–		5	0	–		33	2
Copenhagen	2018–19	Danish Superliga	32	1	1	0	–		12	0	–		45	1
Copenhagen	2019–20	Danish Superliga	35	2	2	0	–		16 (Note: Four appearances in UEFA Champions League, twelve appearances and one goal in UEFA Europa League)	1	–		53	3
Copenhagen	2020–21	Danish Superliga	28	2	1	0	–		3	0	–		32	2
Copenhagen	2021–22	Danish Superliga	11	1	0	0	–		7 (Note: Appearances in UEFA Europa Conference League)	1	–		18	2
Copenhagen	2022–23	Danish Superliga	7	0	0	0	–		4 (Note: Appearances in UEFA Champions League)	0	–		11	0
Copenhagen	Total		140	8	5	0	–		47	2	–		192	10
Panathinaikos	2023–24	Super League Greece	12	0	4	0	–		–		2	0	18	0
Panathinaikos	2024–25	Super League Greece	4	0	1	0	–		2	0	1	0	8	0
Panathinaikos	Total		16	0	5	0	–		2	0	3	0	26	0
Panathinaikos	PAO Total		181	8	26	0	–		39	1	29	0	275	9
Career total			347	16	34	1	2	0	86	3	29	0	498	20

=== International ===
Appearances and goals by national team and year
National team	Year	Apps	Goals
Greece	2017	8	1
Greece	2018	5	0
Greece	2019	6	1
Greece	2020	8	0
Greece	2021	6	0
Greece	2022	0	0
Greece	2023	1	0
Total		34	2

Scores and results list Greece's goal tally first, score column indicates score after each Zeca goal.

List of international goals scored by Zeca
No.	Date	Venue	Cap	Opponent	Score	Result	Competition
1	3 September 2017	Karaiskakis Stadium, Piraeus, Greece	4	Belgium	1–1	1–2	2018 World Cup qualification
2	11 June 2019	Olympic Stadium, Athens, Greece	17	Armenia	1–2	2–3	Euro 2020 qualifying

== Honours ==
Panathinaikos

- Greek Football Cup: 2013–14, 2023–24

Copenhagen

- Danish Superliga: 2018–19, 2021–22, 2022–23

Individual

- Super League Greece Team of the Season: 2014–15, 2015–16
- Danish Superliga Player of the Season: 2019–20
- Copenhagen Player of the Season: 2019–20, 2020–21
