= Maldin Ymeraj =

Albanian footballer

Personal information
- Full name: Maldin Bujar Ymeraj
- Date of birth: 6 March 1995 (age 31)
- Place of birth: Mallakastër, Albania
- Height: 1.82 m (6 ft 0 in)
- Position: Midfielder

Youth career
- 2002–2014: Panathinaikos

Senior career*
Years	Team	Apps	(Gls)
2014–2015	→ Fostiras (loan)	10	(0)
2015–2018	Akropolis	38	(7)
2018	Kukësi	6	(0)
2018–2019	Luftëtari	26	(1)
2019–2020	Panachaiki	0	(0)

International career^{‡}
2011–2012	Albania U-17	8	(0)
2012–2013	Albania U-19	7	(0)
2013	Albania U-20	5	(0)
2015	Albania U-21	3	(0)
- * Club domestic league appearances and goals as of 11 August 2019 ‡ National team caps and goals as of 17 November 2015

Maldin Bujar Ymeraj (born 6 March 1995) is an Albanian professional footballer who plays as a midfielder.

== Club career ==
=== Early career ===
Maldin Ymeraj was born in Mallakastër, Albania and his parents emigrated in Greece when Maldin was 2 years old. His name is not coincidentally similar to the icon of Milan, Paolo Maldini. His father Bujar recounts: "I was a fan of Paolo Maldini and I promised friends that if the child was boy, will line Maldini name". Ymeraj started his youth career at Panathinaikos F.C. academies aged seven. He was scorer of U-17 Academy of Panathinaikos as a 15 years old.

=== Panathinaikos ===
During the 2013–14 season on 13 March 2014 Panathinaikos announced that reached an agreement to sign professional contracts with Ymeraj and the fellow young footballers Nestoras Gekas, Stefanos Kotsaris, Dimitris Myrthianos, Marios Tzanoulinos, Vasilis Angelopoulos, Michail Peter Niouman, Paschalis Staikos, Lazaros Lamprou and Dimitris Aggelopoulos.

=== Fostiras ===
On 29 January 2015 Ymeraj was loaned until the end of the 2014–15 season to Fostiras F.C. first team to gain experience. He made his professional debut on 1 February 2015 by coming on as a 64th-minute substitute in place of Christos Moustogiannis in a goalless draw against Chania.

=== Akropolis ===
In July 2015, Ymeraj moved to Swedish Division 1 Norra club Akropolis IF. He made his league debut for the club on 23 August 2015 in a 4–2 away victory over Carlstad United. In this match, he also scored his first league goal for the club. His goal, scored in the 49th minute, made the score 2-2. He played all ninety minutes of the match.

=== Kukësi ===
In January 2017, Ymeraj moved to Albanian Superliga club FK Kukësi. He made his league debut for the club on 24 February 2018 in a 1–0 home victory over KF Laçi. He was subbed on for Eni Imami in the 69th minute.

== International career ==
Ymeraj was included in the list of coach Ardian Mema the representative U-15 training accumulation talents became Albanian, living in Greece who became the U-17 and U-15, but could not appear. His declared that his big dream is red and black national team of Albania.

=== Albania U21 ===
Ymeraj was called up for the first time at the Albania national under-21 football team by the coach Skënder Gega for the friendly match against Italy u21 on 6 May 2014, the first match ever for Albania U21 after had finished their 2017 UEFA European Under-21 Championship qualification campaign. His next invitation then came to participate in for a mini preparatory stage in Turkey, wreathed with detailed program of Skënder Gega coach, the team also played 3 friendly matches: On 20 January 2015 against Iran U-20, on 22 January against Ukraine U21 counterparts while two days later, on Sunday in front of Albania dated 25 January against China U-23.

== Career statistics ==
=== Club ===
As of 9 February 2015

Season	Club	League country	League		League Cup		Europe		Total	
Season	Club	League country	Apps	Goals	Apps	Goals	Apps	Goals	Apps	Goals
2014–15	Fostiras	Football League (Greece)	10	0	0	0	-	-	10	0
Total			10	0	0	0	0	0	10	0
2015	Akropolis	Allsvenskan	0	0	0	0	-	-	0	0
Total			0	0	0	0	0	0	0	0
Career total			10	0	0	0	0	0	10	0
