= Sergio Sánchez (footballer, born 1986) =

Spanish footballer

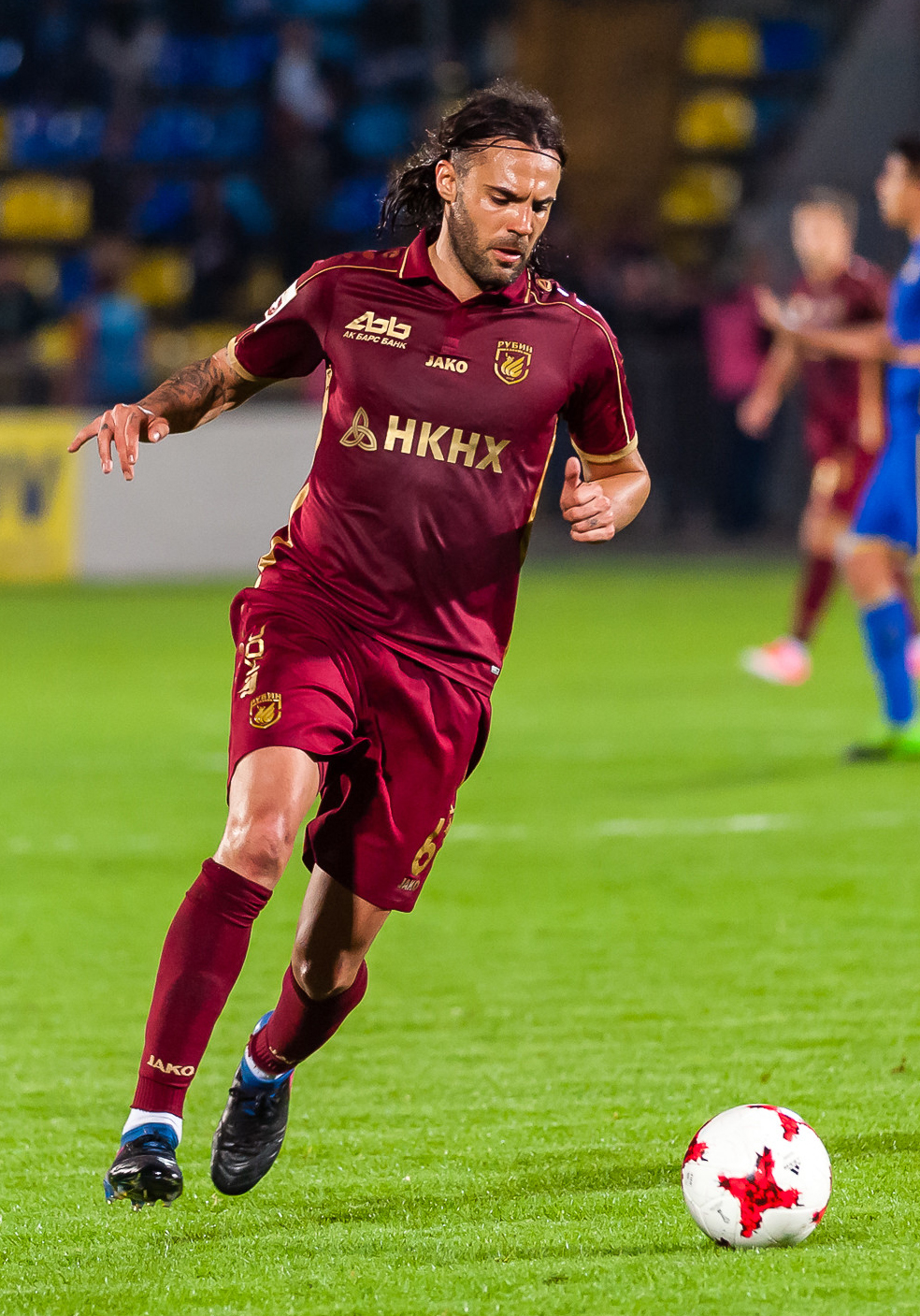
- Sánchez playing with Rubin in 2017

Personal information
- Full name: Sergio Sánchez Ortega
- Date of birth: 3 April 1986 (age 40)
- Place of birth: Mataró, Spain
- Height: 1.85 m (6 ft 1 in)
- Position: Defender

Youth career
- 1998–2004: Espanyol

Senior career*
Years	Team	Apps	(Gls)
2004–2006	Espanyol B	19	(1)
2005–2009	Espanyol	48	(3)
2007	→ Real Madrid B (loan)	20	(0)
2007–2008	→ Racing Santander (loan)	19	(0)
2009–2011	Sevilla	14	(0)
2011–2015	Málaga	85	(0)
2015–2016	Panathinaikos	11	(0)
2016–2018	Rubin Kazan	22	(0)
2017–2018	→ Espanyol (loan)	2	(0)
2018	Espanyol	0	(0)
2018–2020	Cádiz	23	(1)
2020	→ Albacete (loan)	1	(0)
Total		264	(5)

International career
2001–2002	Spain U16	5	(0)
2002–2003	Spain U17	16	(1)
2005	Spain U19	6	(0)
2007–2009	Spain U21	4	(0)
Medal record
Representing Spain
Men's football
FIFA U-17 World Cup
Runner-up	2003 Finland
UEFA European Under-17 Championship
Runner-up	2003 Portugal
- * Club domestic league appearances and goals

Sergio Sánchez Ortega (Spanish pronunciation: [ˈseɾxjo ˈsantʃeθ]; born 3 April 1986) is a Spanish former professional footballer who played as either a right-back or a central defender.

He amassed La Liga totals of 168 games and three goals over the course of 12 seasons, representing Espanyol, Racing de Santander, Sevilla and Málaga in the competition. He won one Copa del Rey with the third club.

== Club career ==
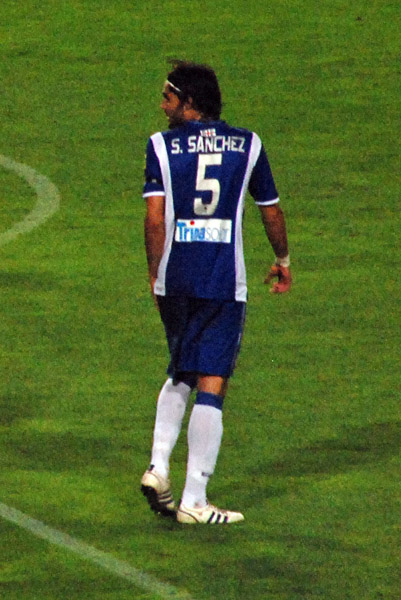
Sánchez playing with Espanyol in 2009

=== Espanyol ===
Born in Mataró, Barcelona, Catalonia, Sánchez was a product of RCD Espanyol's youth system. He made his debut for the first team on 24 April 2005, playing 85 minutes from the bench in a 3–1 home win against Real Zaragoza in what was his sole appearance of the season.

Sánchez was loaned to Segunda División's Real Madrid Castilla in January 2007 and, at the end of the campaign, which ended in relegation, was loaned again, to Racing de Santander in La Liga, appearing significantly as the Cantabrian side achieved a first-ever qualification for the UEFA Cup.

In July 2008, Sánchez returned to Espanyol, scoring his first official goal for the club in a 1–1 home draw with Getafe CF on 20 September. He spent the entire season on the right flank, as the Pericos eventually avoided relegation.

=== Sevilla ===
Sánchez agreed to join Sevilla FC in July 2009 in a four-year deal worth €4 million, with an additional one million being added if the Andalusians attained certain goals. On 1 January 2010, it was announced that he would be unable to play football again until 'rigorous tests' were carried out on his heart, after he complained of pains. His season outputs consisted of seven league games – helping Sevilla to the fourth place – and two in the Copa del Rey which the club won, both legs of the clash against CF Atlético Ciudad (9–3 on aggregate).

On 18 January 2011, after more than one year out of football, Sánchez returned to active – he had already been an unused substitute the previous week against former side Espanyol – starting in a Spanish Cup match against Villarreal CF, and helping the title holders to reach the semi-finals after a 3–0 home win (6–3 on aggregate).

=== Málaga ===
On 23 June 2011, Sánchez left Sevilla and joined neighbours Málaga CF for €2.8 million, signing a four-year contract. He made his debut for his new club on 25 September, appearing as a right-back in the 0–0 draw at Zaragoza.

Sánchez opened the scoring in a Spanish Cup tie against Real Madrid on 3 January 2012, through a header in an eventual 3–2 away loss (4–2 aggregate).

=== Panathinaikos ===
On 28 June 2015, after being linked to former club Espanyol and Beşiktaş JK, the 29-year-old Sánchez moved abroad for the first time in his career and signed with Panathinaikos FC, earning a reported annual salary of €800,000 including objectives. In his debut, at home against Club Brugge KV in the third qualifying round of the UEFA Champions League, he was sent off late into the first half, but the hosts eventually came from behind with one player less to win 2–1.

Sánchez suffered an arm injury during an away game against PAS Giannina F.C. on 7 January 2016 after colliding with teammate Stefanos Kotsolis, going on to be sidelined for approximately three months.

=== Rubin and Espanyol ===
On 27 June 2016, Sánchez moved to Russia after signing with FC Rubin Kazan. On 1 September 2017, he returned to Espanyol after agreeing to a one-year loan.

Sánchez subsequently joined the latter on a permanent deal, leaving the RCDE Stadium in August 2018.

=== Cádiz ===
On 21 September 2018, Sánchez signed a two-year contract with Cádiz CF. On 31 January 2020, after falling down the pecking order, he was loaned to fellow second division side Albacete Balompié for six months.

On 8 August 2020, despite his contract was automatically extended for a further year after Cádiz achieved promotion, Sánchez was released.

== Honours ==
Sevilla

- Copa del Rey: 2009–10
