= Savvas Moudouroglou =

Greek footballer

Personal information
- Date of birth: 15 December 1991 (age 34)
- Place of birth: Drama, Greece
- Height: 1.78 m (5 ft 10 in)
- Position: Forward

Team information
- Current team: Pontioi Nea Amissos

Youth career
- 2008–2011: Aris

Senior career*
Years	Team	Apps	(Gls)
2010–2011	Eordaikos	16	(2)
2011–2012	Niki Volos	9	(0)
2013–2015	Doxa Drama	19	(0)
2015–2016	Panthrakikos	9	(1)
2017–2018	Aiolikos		
2018–2019	Aetos Orfano		
2019–2020	Ethnikos Piraeus		
2020–2021	Pandramaikos		
2021–2022	Doxa Drama		
2025	Doxa Drama		
2025–	Pontioi Nea Amissos		
- * Club domestic league appearances and goals as of 23:26, 9 March 2020 (UTC)

Savvas Moudouroglou (Greek: Σάββας Μουδούρογλου; born 15 December 1991) is a Greek forward who plays for Gamma Ethniki club Pontioi Nea Amissos.

== Career ==
=== Ethnikos Piraeus ===
On 7 October 2019 it was confirmed, that Moudouroglou had joined Gamma Ethniki club Ethnikos Piraeus.
