= Nestoras Gekas =

Greek footballer

Personal information
- Full name: Nestor Gekas
- Date of birth: 7 March 1995 (age 31)
- Place of birth: Karditsa, Greece
- Height: 1.85 m (6 ft 1 in)
- Position: Goalkeeper

Youth career
- Panathinaikos

Senior career*
Years	Team	Apps	(Gls)
2014–2015	Panathinaikos	0	(0)
2014–2015	→ Fostiras (loan)	18	(0)
2015–2016	Panthrakikos	0	(0)
2016	Kallithea	1	(0)
2016–2017	Kissamikos	0	(0)
2017–2018	Anagennisi Karditsa	30	(0)
2018–2019	AEL	0	(0)
2019–2020	Apollon Larissa	21	(0)
2020–2021	Levadiakos	5	(0)
2021	Apollon Larissa	0	(0)
2021	Aspropyrgos	6	(0)
2021–2024	Anagennisi Karditsa	43	(0)
2024–2026	Trikala		

International career
2013	Greece U19	2	(0)
2015	Greece U21	2	(0)
- * Club domestic league appearances and goals as of 30 July 2025

Nestoras Gekas (Greek: Νέστορας Γκέκας, born 7 March 1995) is a Greek professional footballer who plays as a goalkeeper.
