= Jörn Wemmer =

German footballer

Personal information
- Full name: Jörn Andreas Wemmer
- Date of birth: 13 May 1984 (age 42)
- Place of birth: Berlin, Germany
- Height: 1.83 m (6 ft 0 in)
- Position: Midfielder

Youth career
- –2004: SpVg Aurich

Senior career*
Years	Team	Apps	(Gls)
2004–2005	SV Meppen	6	(0)
2005–2008	VfL Wolfsburg II	57	(7)
2008–2009	FC Oberneuland	10	(2)
2009–2011	Erzgebirge Aue	12	(0)
2011–2012	Berliner AK	15	(0)
2012–2014	Berliner FC Dynamo	29	(10)
Total		129	(19)
- * Club domestic league appearances and goals

Jörn Wemmer (born 13 May 1984) is a German former professional footballer who played as a midfielder. Wemmer played most of his career with a mix of professional and amateur teams from levels 4 through 6, but he did sign with professional Erzgebirge Aue as a backup player for two seasons, appearing in seven matches with them in level 3. Liga, then five matches in level 2. Bundesliga during his second season with the team.

== Personal life ==
Wemmer is the older brother of footballer Jens Wemmer.

He joined lower-league side in TSG Einheit Bernau in 2016.
