= Ousmane Coulibaly =

Malian footballer (born 1989)

Personal information
- Date of birth: 9 July 1989 (age 37)
- Place of birth: Paris, France
- Height: 1.83 m (6 ft 0 in)
- Position: Defender

Youth career
- 2007–2008: FC Mantes

Senior career*
Years	Team	Apps	(Gls)
2008–2009	Guingamp	2	(0)
2009–2014	Brest	71	(0)
2014–2016	Platanias	50	(4)
2016–2019	Panathinaikos	52	(0)
2019–2022	Al-Wakrah	52	(3)
2022–2023	Al Shahaniya	8	(1)

International career
2011–2017	Mali	16	(0)
- * Club domestic league appearances and goals

Ousmane Coulibaly (born 9 July 1989) is a professional former footballer who plays as a defender. Born in France, he represented Mali at international level. His brother is the professional kickboxer, multiple champion of France and world champion, Abdarhmane Coulibaly.

== Career ==
In August 2014, Coulibaly signed a three-year contract with Super League side Platanias for an undisclosed fee. He played exceptionally well for two consecutive years, therefore was monitored by several Greek top clubs, as well as German and English clubs.

On 30 August 2016, Coulibaly moved to Panathinaikos for an estimated amount of €250,000 signing a three-season contract with the club. He was expected to be the backup of experienced Italian Giandomenico Mesto. On 11 January 2018, Mechelen filed an offer to the financially struggling Greens for the acquisition of Coulibaly in the range of €200,000. The player asked to be excluded from the first-team squad on 16 April 2018 due to Panathinaikos being in a dire financial and administrative state, and two weeks later, he filed an official request to leave Panathinaikos on a free transfer.

On 8 January 2022, in the first half of the Qatar Stars League match between Al-Rayyan and Al-Wakrah, Coulibaly suffered a heart attack and was taken to hospital. He was in a stable condition per a statement from his club.

== Career statistics ==
As of 10 April 2023

Appearances and goals by club, season and competition
Club	Season	League			Cup		Continental*		Other**		Total	
Club	Season	Division	Apps	Goals	Apps	Goals	Apps	Goals	Apps	Goals	Apps	Goals
Guingamp	2008–09	Ligue 2	2	0	-	-	-	-	-	-	2	0
Brest	2009–10	Ligue 1	1	0	1	0	-	-	-	-	2	0
Brest	2010–11	Ligue 1	7	0	-	-	-	-	-	-	7	0
Brest	2011-12	Ligue 1	18	0	1	0	-	-	1	0	20	0
Brest	2012–13	Ligue 1	14	0	1	0	-	-	1	0	16	0
Brest	2013–14	Ligue 1	31	0	1	0	-	-	-	-	32	0
Brest	Total		71	0	4	0	0	0	2	0	77	0
Platanias	2014–15	Super League Greece	24	2	-	-	-	-	-	-	24	2
Platanias	2015–16	Super League Greece	26	2	2	0	-	-	-	-	28	2
Platanias	Total		50	4	2	0	0	0	0	0	52	4
Panathinaikos	2016–17	Super League Greece	19	0	5	0	4	0	2	0	30	0
Panathinaikos	2017–18	Super League Greece	16	0	2	0	2	0	0	0	20	0
Panathinaikos	2018–19	Super League Greece	17	0	1	0	0	0	0	0	18	0
Panathinaikos	Total		52	0	8	0	6	0	2	0	68	0
Al-Wakrah SC	2019–20	Qatar Stars League	18	1	3	0	0	0	0	0	21	1
Al-Wakrah SC	2020–21	Qatar Stars League	22	2	4	2	0	0	1	0	27	4
Al-Wakrah SC	2021–22	Qatar Stars League	12	0	4	1	0	0	0	0	16	1
Al-Wakrah SC	Total		52	3	11	3	0	0	1	0	64	6
Al Shahaniya	2022–23	Qatari Second Division	8	1	2	1	-	-	-	-	10	2
Career total			235	8	27	4	6	0	5	0	273	12

(* Includes UEFA Champions League and UEFA Europa League)

(** Includes Coupe de la Ligue and Greek Playoffs)

== Honours ==
Mali

- Africa Cup of Nations bronze: 2013
