= Olivier Boumal =

Cameroonian footballer

Personal information
- Full name: Olivier Junior Boumal
- Date of birth: 17 September 1989 (age 37)
- Place of birth: Douala, Cameroon
- Height: 1.74 m (5 ft 9 in)
- Position: Winger

Youth career
- George Fominyen FC
- CFF Paris
- Saint-Étienne
- Albacete Balompié

Senior career*
Years	Team	Apps	(Gls)
2010–2012	Panetolikos	40	(3)
2012–2013	Astra Giurgiu	0	(0)
2013	Levadiakos	3	(0)
2013–2014	Iraklis Psachna	23	(10)
2014–2016	Panionios	46	(9)
2016–2017	Panathinaikos	29	(2)
2017	Liaoning Whowin	11	(2)
2018	Yokohama F. Marinos	15	(2)
2019	Panionios	9	(1)
2020–2021	Saburtalo Tbilisi	8	(0)
2021–2022	Newcastle Jets	20	(4)
2022–2023	Al-Merrikh SC		

International career^{‡}
2009	Cameroon U-20	3	(0)
2017–2019	Cameroon	7	(0)
- * Club domestic league appearances and goals as of 15 May 2022 ‡ National team caps and goals as of 7 February 2019

Olivier Boumal (born 17 September 1989) is a Cameroonian professional footballer who last played as a winger for Al-Merrikh SC. Between 2017 and 2019 he made six appearances for the Cameroon national team.

== Career ==
Boumal began his career with George Fominyen FC before moving to Europe in 2005 signing with CFF Paris. After one year with the team from Paris he joined the youth and reserve team of AS Saint-Étienne.

In January 2010, he signed a 2.5-year contract with Super League club Panetolikos, after a successful trial. He also played for Levadiakos and Iraklis Psachna.

In summer 2014, Boumal signed a two-year contract to Panionios for an undisclosed fee. At the end of 2014–15 season, he was linked with a move to Turkish club Mersin İdmanyurdu.

On 23 December 2015, Boumal joined Panathinaikos on a 2.5-year contract for a reported transfer fee of €400,000 plus one Panathinaikos player Christos Donis, Kostas Triantafyllopoulos and Diamantis Chouchoumis. On 11 January 2016, he made his club debut by having an appearance along with a late goal, helping his club to a 2–0 win against AEL Kalloni. On 31 January 2016, in a 3–2 away win against Platanias, Boumal broke his collarbone which required surgery and would keep him out of action for 4–6 weeks.

On 6 July 2017, Boumal signed 1.5-season contract with Chinese Super League club Liaoning Whowin for a €2.2 million fee, leaving Panathinaikos after 18 months.

On 14 February 2019, he returned to Panionios on a free transfer.

Boumal joined FC Saburtalo Tbilisi of the Georgian Erovnuli Liga in August 2020 on a one-year contract.

In August 2021, Boumal joined Australian club Newcastle Jets on a one-year contract.

== International career ==
Boumal played for the Cameroon national under-20 football team the 2009 FIFA U-20 World Cup.

On 29 May 2017, Olivier Bumal was included for the first time in Cameroon's squad for Morocco on 10 June for the 2019 Africa Cup of Nations qualifiers and the Confederations Cup to be held from 17 June to 2 July in Russia. Cameroon will participate in the second group with Chile, Australia and Germany, representing Africa. On 10 June 2017, he made his international debut as a late substitute in a 1–0 2019 Africa Cup of Nations qualifiers win against Morocco.

== Honours ==
Panetolikos

- Beta Ethniki: 2010–11
