= Jens Wemmer =

German footballer (born 1985)

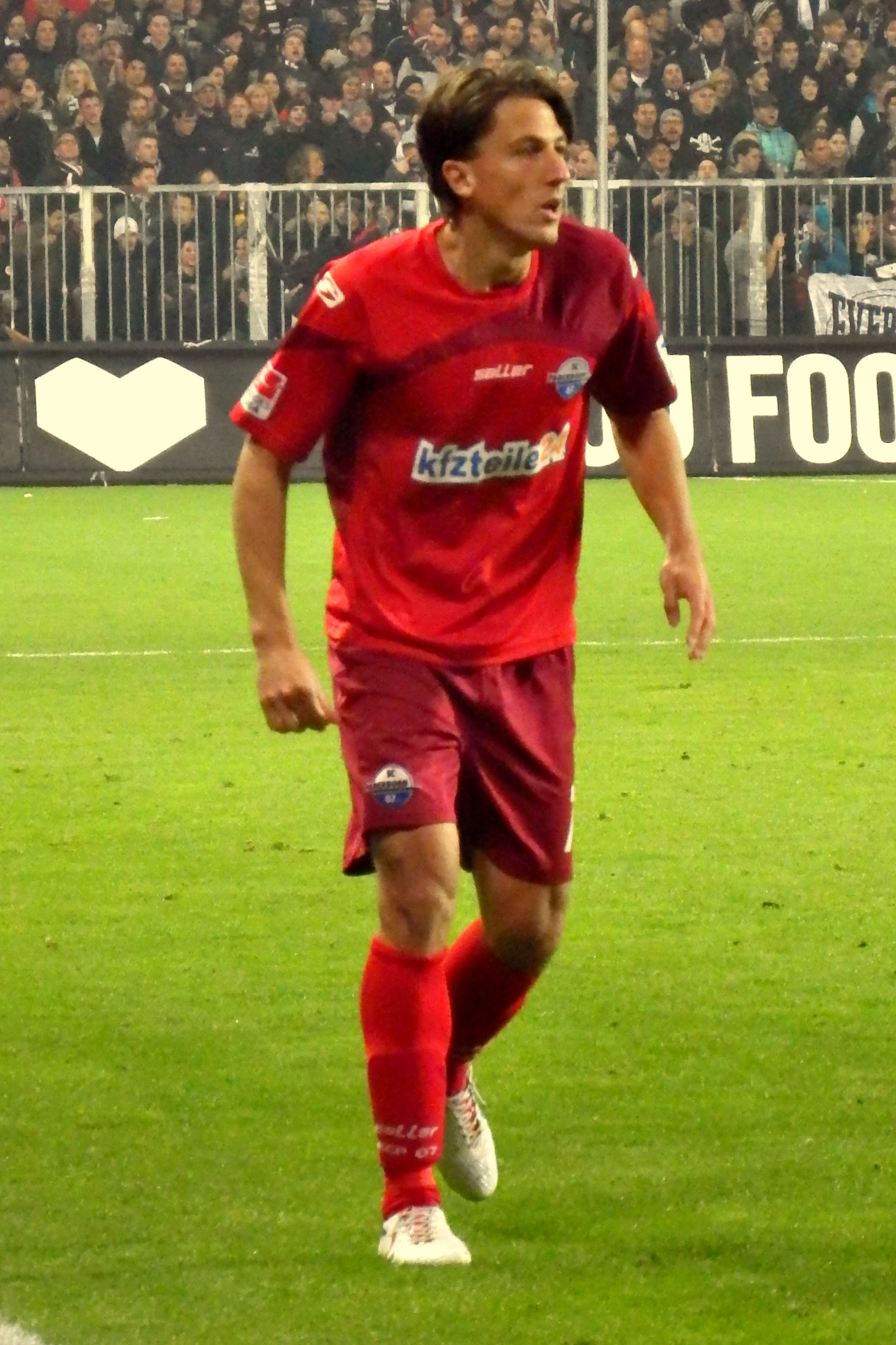
- Wemmer playing for Paderborn in 2013

Personal information
- Date of birth: 31 October 1985 (age 41)
- Place of birth: Aurich, West Germany
- Height: 1.85 m (6 ft 1 in)
- Position: Right-back

Youth career
- TuS Sandhorst
- SpVg Aurich
- –2005: Werder Bremen

Senior career*
Years	Team	Apps	(Gls)
2005–2008	VfL Wolfsburg II	58	(3)
2008–2015	SC Paderborn 07	163	(9)
2015–2017	Panathinaikos	4	(0)
2018–2019	Tarxien Rainbows	18	(5)
2019–2020	Hibernians	12	(0)
Total		255	(17)
- * Club domestic league appearances and goals

Jens Wemmer (born 31 October 1985) is a German former professional footballer who played as a right-back. He played for seven consecutive years for SC Paderborn. He is the brother of Jörn Wemmer.

== Career ==
After being released by SC Paderborn Wemmer joined Super League Greece club Panathinaikos in May 2015. He signed a three-year contract.

In January 2016, it was reported he was not in the plans of manager Andrea Stramaccioni.

In July 2017, Wemmer terminated his contract with Panathinaikos and returned to Germany. He filed an appeal with the Financial Dispute Resolution Committee for €500,000. His manager also appealed to the committee, demanding that he be paid €15,000 for his commission. On 28 September 2017, the committee of the Greek Football Federation's financial disputes gave the football player the amount of €498,000 plus the legal interest. On 19 March 2018, Hellenic Football Federation announced the deduction of three points from Panathinaikos for the delay in repayment of Wemmer, a penalty that would be triggered in a new court, as in the ruling it was clarified that "the immediate application of the decision is rejected". Eventually on 20 April 2018, Panathinaikos faced a three points deduction, as the debt to Wemmer had not been settled within the specified period. The administration of the club was unable to reach an agreement with him and the points' deduction was confirmed.

Hibernians announced on 29 June 2019, that they had signed Wemmer on a one-year contract.
