= Efthymis Argyropoulos =

Greek footballer (born 1990)

Personal information
- Full name: Efthymios Argyropoulos
- Date of birth: 22 April 1990 (age 36)
- Place of birth: Patras, Greece
- Height: 1.78 m (5 ft 10 in)
- Position: Midfielder

Youth career
- 2005–2010: Thyella Patras

Senior career*
Years	Team	Apps	(Gls)
2010–2011	Paniliakos	19	(0)
2011–2014	Panegialios	51	(8)
2014–2015	Kalamata	5	(1)
2015–2016	Doxa Manolada	27	(1)
2016–2019	Panachaiki	54	(4)
2019–2020	Doxa Drama	7	(0)
2020	Episkopi	1	(0)
2020–2021	Panachaiki	8	(0)
2021–2022	Nea Artaki		
2022	Mykonos		
2022–2023	Keravnos Agios Vasilios		
- * Club domestic league appearances and goals as of 18 May 2021

Efthymis Argyropoulos (Greek: Ευθύμης Αργυρόπουλος; born 22 April 1990) is a Greek professional footballer who plays as a midfielder.
