= Nikos Giannakopoulos =

Greek footballer (born 1993)

Personal information
- Full name: Nikolaos Giannakopoulos
- Date of birth: 19 February 1993 (age 33)
- Place of birth: Tripoli, Greece
- Height: 1.93 m (6 ft 4 in)
- Position: Goalkeeper

Team information
- Current team: Panionios
- Number: 1

Youth career
- –2009: Asteras Tripolis
- 2009–2010: Blackburn Rovers
- 2010–2011: Asteras Tripolis
- 2011–2014: Udinese

Senior career*
Years	Team	Apps	(Gls)
2012–2014	Udinese	0	(0)
2012–2014	→ Panionios (loan)	27	(0)
2014–2015	Panionios	8	(0)
2015–2017	Panathinaikos	1	(0)
2016–2017	→ Aris Limassol (loan)	23	(0)
2017–2018	Kerkyra	25	(0)
2018–2020	Panetolikos	18	(0)
2020–2021	Apollon Smyrnis	0	(0)
2022–2023	Zimbru Chișinău	22	(0)
2023–2024	Hapoel Petah Tikva	4	(0)
2024	EIF	1	(0)
2024–	Panionios	44	(0)

International career
2011	Greece U19	1	(0)
- * Club domestic league appearances and goals as of 20 April 2026

Nikolaos Giannakopoulos (Greek: Νίκος Γιαννακόπουλος; born 19 February 1993) is a Greek professional footballer who plays as a goalkeeper for Super League 2 club Panionios.

== Career ==
Giannakopoulos began his career in the youth team of Asteras Tripolis, after which he joined the youth team of Blackburn Rovers, and after a year at Blackburn Rovers, he joined the youth team of Italian club Udinese Calcio.

Eventually, Giannakopoulos was released and returned to his country to join Panionios. On 27 August 2012, he made his league debut against Aris. Giannakopoulos has been the first-choice keeper for the club since the early part of 2013. There was a brief period when Kostas Peristeridis displaced him from top spot again after young Giannakapoulos oversaw a run of 3 straight defeats. But he regained his spot later in the 2013–14 season and has been the first choice ever since. Arguably his best performance came in the early part of his career when he kept a clean sheet against Greek giants, Panathanaikos. He repeated this feat the following season as Panionios beat Panathanaikos 3–0 with Giannakopoulos as a main goalie.

On 29 July 2015, Giannakopoulos signed his four (three years with an option for an additional one) years' contract with Greek giants Panathinaikos for €180,000, adding another high-caliber Greek talent to their squad. On 17 April 2016, in the last game of the 2015–16 season, he made his debut with the club in a 6–1 home win against Panthrakikos. As he is not among the first priorities of Panathinaikos coach Andrea Stramaccioni he signed a long-term year loan with Cypriot club Aris Limassol FC.

On 26 June 2017, Giannakopoulos signed a two-year contract with Kerkyra.

On 4 July 2018, following the relegation of Kerkyra to the Football League, he joined Panetolikos on a two-year deal.

On 13 March 2024, Giannakopoulos signed with newly promoted Finnish Veikkausliiga club Ekenäs IF. He was injured in his Veikkausliiga debut, in the opening game of the season. On 30 June 2024, his contract with EIF was terminated by mutual consent.

== Career statistics ==
As of 10 June 2024

Club	Season	League			Cup		Continental		Other		Total	
Club	Season	Division	Apps	Goals	Apps	Goals	Apps	Goals	Apps	Goals	Apps	Goals
Panionios	2012–13	Super League Greece	14	0	0	0	—		—		14	0
Panionios	2013–14	Super League Greece	13	0	0	0	—		—		13	0
Panionios	2014–15	Super League Greece	8	0	3	0	—		—		11	0
Panionios	Total		35	0	3	0	—		—		38	0
Panathinaikos	2015–16	Super League Greece	1	0	0	0	—		—		1	0
Aris Limassol (loan)	2016–17	Cypriot First Division	23	0	1	0	—		—		24	0
Kerkyra	2017–18	Super League Greece	25	0	1	0	—		—		26	0
Panetolikos	2018–19	Super League Greece	11	0	3	0	—		—		14	0
Panetolikos	2019–20	Super League Greece	7	0	1	0	—		—		8	0
Panetolikos	Total		18	0	4	0	—		—		22	0
Apollon Smyrnis	2020–21	Super League Greece	0	0	1	0	—		—		1	0
Zimbru Chișinău	2022–23	Moldovan Super Liga	22	0	0	0	—		2	0	24	0
Hapoel Petah Tikva	2023–24	Israeli Premier League	4	0	0	0	—		0	0	4	0
EIF	2024	Veikkausliiga	1	0	0	0	—		0	0	1	0
Career total			127	0	10	0	0	0	2	0	141	0
