= Stefanos Kotsolis =

Greek footballer

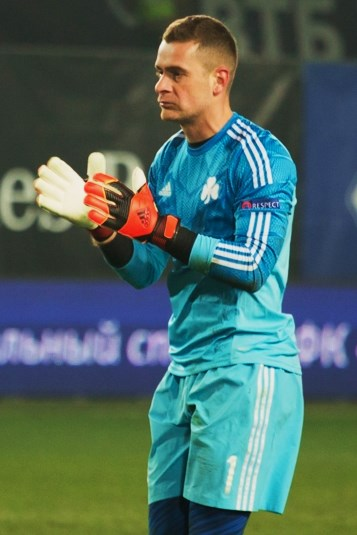
- Kotsolis with Panathinaikos in 2014

Personal information
- Date of birth: 5 June 1979 (age 47)
- Place of birth: Athens, Greece
- Height: 1.90 m (6 ft 3 in)
- Position: Goalkeeper

Team information
- Current team: Panathinaikos (technical director)

Youth career
- 1997–1998: Panathinaikos

Senior career*
Years	Team	Apps	(Gls)
1998–2005	Panathinaikos	8	(0)
2005–2009	AEL	100	(0)
2009–2010	Omonia	15	(0)
2010–2017	Panathinaikos	17	(0)
Total		140	(0)

International career^{‡}
2005–2011	Greece	5	(0)
- * Club domestic league appearances and goals as of 14:52, 15 June 2017 (UTC) ‡ National team caps and goals as of 18:17, 22 December 2014 (UTC)

Stefanos Kotsolis (Greek: Στέφανος Κοτσόλης; born 5 June 1979) is a Greek former professional footballer who played as a goalkeeper.

== Club career ==
=== Panathinaikos ===
Born in Athens, Kotsolis joined Panathinaikos as an 18-year-old youth player in 1997 and made sporadic appearances over his first five seasons at Panathinaikos. The imposing form of first-choice keeper Antonios Nikopolidis and the presence of Józef Wandzik, Kostas Chalkias and Mario Galinović kept Kotsolis most of that time at the bench. He made his professional debut for Panathinaikos on 13 April 1999, in a Greek Cup game against Athinaikos.

=== AEL ===
In 2005, Kotsolis was transferred to AEL where he made a total of 121 appearances, playing there until June 2009. During season 2006/2007, he won the Greek Cup after beating his former club Panathinaikos at the final.

=== Omonia ===
He was then transferred to Cypriot club Omonia, from where he was released in summer 2010. Here he won Cypriot First Division and the LTV Super Cup.

=== Return to Panathinaikos ===
On 8 February 2011 he returned to Panathinaikos after five and a half years of absence from the team. On 23 July 2013, he renewed his contract for 2 more years. On 26 April 2014, Kotsolis won his third Greek Cup playing at the final against PAOK.

Kotsolis was released by Panathinaikos after the end of 2016–17 season.

== International career ==
He is a former Greece under-21 international and team captain at the 2002 UEFA European Under-21 Football Championship. He is also a senior international with Greece, making 5 appearances since 2005.

== Career statistics ==
As of 14 April 2017

Club	Season	League			Cup		Europe*		Other**		Total	
Club	Season	Division	Apps	Goals	Apps	Goals	Apps	Goals	Apps	Goals	Apps	Goals
Panathinaikos	1998–99	Super League Greece	1	0	1	0	0	0	0	0	2	0
Panathinaikos	1999–00	Super League Greece	1	0	0	0	0	0	0	0	1	0
Panathinaikos	2000–01	Super League Greece	1	0	4	0	0	0	0	0	5	0
Panathinaikos	2001–02	Super League Greece	1	0	2	0	0	0	0	0	3	0
Panathinaikos	2002–03	Super League Greece	2	0	5	0	0	0	0	0	7	0
Panathinaikos	2003–04	Super League Greece	2	0	0	0	0	0	0	0	2	0
Panathinaikos	2004–05	Super League Greece	0	0	2	0	0	0	0	0	2	0
Panathinaikos	Total		8	0	14	0	0	0	0	0	22	0
AEL	2005–06	Super League Greece	27	0	7	0	0	0	0	0	34	0
AEL	2006–07	Super League Greece	25	0	5	0	0	0	0	0	30	0
AEL	2007–08	Super League Greece	17	0	3	0	5	0	0	0	25	0
AEL	2008–09	Super League Greece	31	0	1	0	0	0	0	0	32	0
AEL	Total		100	0	16	0	5	0	0	0	121	0
Omonia	2009–10	Cypriot First Division	15	0	1	0	4	0	0	0	20	0
Omonia	Total		15	0	1	0	4	0	0	0	20	0
Panathinaikos	2010–11	Super League Greece	1	0	1	0	0	0	1	0	3	0
Panathinaikos	2011–12	Super League Greece	3	0	0	0	1	0	0	0	4	0
Panathinaikos	2012–13	Super League Greece	0	0	1	0	0	0	0	0	1	0
Panathinaikos	2013–14	Super League Greece	7	0	9	0	0	0	1	0	17	0
Panathinaikos	2014–15	Super League Greece	6	0	3	0	7	0	0	0	16	0
Panathinaikos	2015–16	Super League Greece	0	0	5	0	2	0	0	0	7	0
Panathinaikos	2016–17	Super League Greece	0	0	1	0	0	0	0	0	1	0
Panathinaikos	Total		17	0	20	0	10	0	2	0	49	0
Career total			140	0	51	0	19	0	2	0	212	0

(* Includes UEFA Europa League and UEFA Champions League) (** Includes Super League Play-offs )

== Honours ==
Panathinaikos

- Alpha Ethniki: 2003–04
- Greek Cup: 2003–04, 2013–14

AEL

- Greek Cup: 2006–07

Omonia

- Cypriot First Division: 2009–10
- LTV Super Cup: 2010
