= Giandomenico Mesto =

Italian footballer

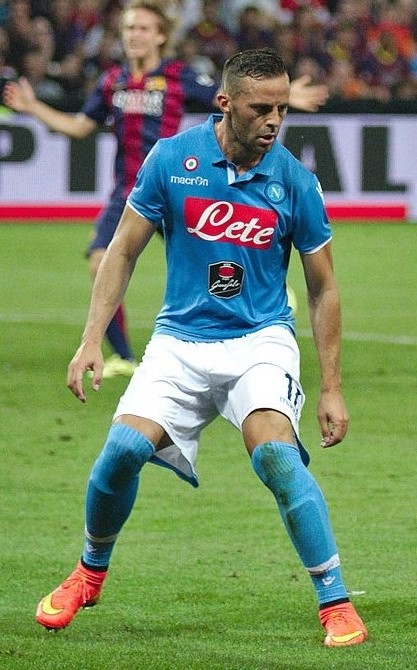
- Mesto playing for Napoli in 2014

Personal information
- Full name: Giandomenico Mesto
- Date of birth: 25 May 1982 (age 44)
- Place of birth: Monopoli, Italy
- Height: 1.81 m (5 ft 11 in)
- Positions: Right back; right midfielder

Senior career*
Years	Team	Apps	(Gls)
1998–2008	Reggina	138	(1)
2000–2001	→ Cremonese (loan)	19	(0)
2001–2002	→ Fermana (loan)	31	(6)
2007–2008	→ Udinese (loan)	28	(2)
2008–2012	Genoa	132	(8)
2012–2015	Napoli	34	(1)
2015–2017	Panathinaikos	28	(0)

International career
2002–2003	Italy U-18	7	(2)
2002–2003	Italy U-20	7	(2)
2004–2005	Italy U-21	8	(0)
2005–2007	Italy	3	(0)
Medal record
Representing Italy
Men's Football
Bronze medal – third place	2004	Team competition
UEFA European Under-21 Championship
Gold medal – first place	2004
- * Club domestic league appearances and goals

Giandomenico Mesto Cavaliere OMRI (Italian pronunciation: [dʒandoˈmeːniko ˈmɛsto]; born 25 May 1982) is a former Italian footballer. Known for his pace, work-rate, and versatility, Mesto usually played as a full-back or as a wide midfielder on the right flank.

== Club career ==
After making his professional debut during the 1998–99 Serie B season, Mesto has spent the majority of his career at Reggina, aside from spells with Cremonese and Fermana during the 2001–02 Serie C2 and C1 seasons, makine 138 appearances and scoring 1 goal; he was loaned out to Udinese during the 2007–08 season. In 2008, he transferred to Genoa, where he remained for four seasons. In 2012, he moved to Napoli where he remained until the 2014–15 Serie A season, winning a Coppa Italia and the Supercoppa Italiana in 2014. At the end of the season, his contract was not renewed. On 31 December 2015 he signed with Greek side Panathinaikos for one and a half years. On 1 June 2016, Mesto extended his contract with the club for another year till the summer of 2018.

== International career ==
At international level, Mesto appeared in the Italian under-21 national team which won the 2004 UEFA European Under-21 Championship, and was a member of the under-23 Olympic squad which won the bronze medal at the 2004 Summer Olympics in Athens. Afterwards, he made his senior international debut for Italy a year later, in a 1–1 friendly draw against Serbia and Montenegro, on 8 June 2005; in total, he has obtained three caps for Italy.

== Honours ==
=== International ===
Italy U21

- UEFA European Under-21 Championship: 2004
- Olympic Bronze Medal: 2004

=== Club ===
Napoli

- Coppa Italia: 2013–14
- Supercoppa Italiana: 2014

=== Orders ===
- 5th Class / Knight: Cavaliere Ordine al Merito della Repubblica Italiana: 2004
