= Diamantis Chouchoumis =

Greek footballer (born 1994)

Personal information
- Date of birth: 17 July 1994 (age 32)
- Place of birth: Aliveri, Euboea, Greece
- Height: 1.83 m (6 ft 0 in)
- Position: Left-back

Team information
- Current team: Athens Kallithea
- Number: 3

Youth career
- 2008–2012: Panathinaikos

Senior career*
Years	Team	Apps	(Gls)
2012–2017	Panathinaikos	39	(1)
2017–2018	Slovan Bratislava	20	(0)
2018–2019	Vojvodina	7	(0)
2019–2021	Apollon Smyrnis	37	(1)
2021–2023	Panetolikos	51	(1)
2023–2025	Asteras Tripolis	43	(1)
2025–2026	A.E. Kifisia	13	(0)
2026–	Athens Kallithea	3	(0)

International career^{‡}
2011–2015	Greece U19	7	(1)
2015	Greece U21	4	(0)
- * Club domestic league appearances and goals as of 20 September 2026 ‡ National team caps and goals as of 1 June 2020

Diamantis Chouchoumis (Greek: Διαμαντής Χουχούμης; born 17 July 1994) is a Greek professional footballer who plays as a left-back for Super League 2 club Athens Kallithea.

== Club career ==
On 29 October 2012, during a Super League match against OFI, he made his official debut for the men's team with Panathinaikos. He plays as left back and comes from the club's youth ranks. On 22 December 2014 he scored his first goal for Panathinaikos against Kerkyra. On 1 April 2014, he signed a new contract with Panathinaikos till 2018.

On 29 July 2017, Slovan Bratislava officially announced the signing of Chouchoumis on a one-year contract for an undisclosed fee, as the 23-year-old player was not in the season plans of Greek manager of The Greens, Marinos Ouzounidis.

On 11 July 2018, Chouchoumis signed a two-year deal with the Serbian club Vojvodina Novi Sad. On 25 February 2019, Chouchoumis and Vojvodina mutually terminated the contract.

On 10 July 2019, he joined Apollon Smyrnis on a free transfer.

== International career ==
After becoming a frequent presence in the calls of Greece U19 since 2011, in 2015, when he made 21 years of age, he debuted for the Greek U21 team.

== Career statistics ==
As of 13 January 2025

Club	Season	League			Cup		Continental		Other		Total	
Club	Season	Division	Apps	Goals	Apps	Goals	Apps	Goals	Apps	Goals	Apps	Goals
Panathinaikos	2012–13	Super League Greece	8	0	2	0	1	0	—		11	0
Panathinaikos	2013–14	Super League Greece	9	0	5	0	—		—		14	0
Panathinaikos	2014–15	Super League Greece	14	1	3	0	1	0	—		18	1
Panathinaikos	2015–16	Super League Greece	2	0	2	0	0	0	—		4	0
Panathinaikos	2016–17	Super League Greece	6	0	4	0	2	0	—		0	0
Panathinaikos	Total		39	1	16	0	4	0	—		59	1
Slovan Bratislava	2017–18	Slovak Super Liga	16	0	4	0	—		—		20	0
Vojvodina	2018–19	Serbian SuperLiga	6	0	1	0	—		—		7	0
Apollon Smyrnis	2019–20	Super League Greece 2	9	1	1	0	—		—		10	1
Apollon Smyrnis	2020–21	Super League Greece	25	0	2	0	—		—		27	0
Apollon Smyrnis	Total		34	1	2	0	—		—		37	1
Panetolikos	2021–22	Super League Greece	20	0	4	0	—		—		24	0
Panetolikos	2022–23	Super League Greece	27	1	0	0	—		—		27	1
Panetolikos	Total		47	1	4	0	—		—		51	1
Asteras Tripolis	2023–24	Super League Greece	19	0	2	0	—		—		21	0
Asteras Tripolis	2024–25	Super League Greece	13	1	3	0	—		—		16	1
Asteras Tripolis	Total		32	1	5	0	—		—		37	1
Career total			174	4	33	0	4	0	0	0	211	4

== Honours ==
Panathinaikos

- Greek Cup: 2014

Slovan Bratislava

- Slovak Cup: 2018
