= Rodrigo Moledo =

Brazilian footballer

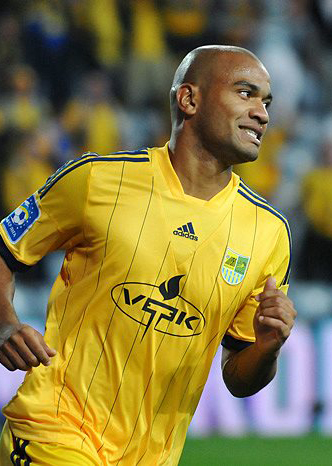

Personal information
- Full name: Rodrigo Modesto da Silva Moledo
- Date of birth: 27 October 1987 (age 39)
- Place of birth: Rio de Janeiro, Brazil
- Height: 1.88 m (6 ft 2 in)
- Position: Centre-back

Team information
- Current team: Coritiba
- Number: 4

Youth career
- 1996–2000: Macaé
- 2000–2003: Vasco da Gama
- 2005: São Caetano
- 2003–2008: Camboriú

Senior career*
Years	Team	Apps	(Gls)
2008	Camboriú		
2009–2010	União Rondonópolis	6	(1)
2009	→ Odra Wodzisław (loan)	3	(0)
2010–2013	Internacional	78	(4)
2013–2014	Metalist Kharkiv	13	(1)
2015	Internacional	0	(0)
2016–2018	Panathinaikos	45	(4)
2018–2024	Internacional	120	(7)
2024	Chapecoense	3	(0)
2025–	Coritiba	9	(0)
- * Club domestic league appearances and goals as of 7 April 2026

Rodrigo Modesto da Silva Moledo (born 27 October 1987) is a Brazilian professional footballer who plays as a centre back for Coritiba.

== Club career ==
=== Early career ===
Born in Rio de Janeiro, Moledo was known as Rodrigão during the start of his career. He started his senior career with Camboriú FC in early 2008, playing in the second division of Campeonato Catarinense.

Moledo attracted the interest of União Esporte Clube, a Brazilian football team from Rondonópolis, Mato Grosso. In the summer of 2009, they sent him on a loan in the Polish club Odra Wodzisław, and he returned to the side for the 2010 season, helping them to win the 2010 Campeonato Mato-Grossense.

=== Internacional ===
Moledo impressed the scouts of Internacional while playing for União in a match against them for the 2009 Copa do Brasil. He signed with the club in 2010, and spent his first year at the club with the B-side before being promoted to the main squad for the 2011 season. He scored his first goal for Inter on 7 September 2011, in 4–2 victory against América Mineiro in the Campeonato Brasileiro.

=== Metalist Kharkiv ===
In 2013, Metalist Kharkiv acquired Moledo for R$ 20.51 million. In Ukraine, the beginning was exciting and Moledo he started playing important matches, but a serious knee injury kept him out of for a number of games. In 2013–14 season, Moledo started in the Champions League qualifying round against PAOK. He had a vital role for the club in all competitions.

=== Return to Internacional ===
After leaving Metalist, Moledo returned to Internacional on 3 July 2015, signing a contract until the end of the year. However, he only featured twice as an unused substitute before leaving the club the following January, without making a re-debut.

=== Panathinaikos ===
In January 2016, Moledo signed for Panathinaikos until the summer of 2018. On 19 March 2016, he scored twice against Iraklis for Super League Greece game and expressed his happiness for his team's victory. On 28 July 2016, he scored the only goal in a UEFA Europa League game against AIK for the first leg of the third qualifying round.

Moledo started the 2016–17 season as the indisputable leader of the Greens' defence. On 14 February 2017, Panathinaikos defender is believed to be unhappy for not having his contract renewed as ex-Panathinaikos manager Andrea Stramaccioni promised him.

=== Third spell at Internacional ===
On 10 January 2018, Moledo signed a contract with Sport Club Internacional, a deal which will begin on 1 July after his current agreement with Panathinaikos runs out. Fifteen days later, however, he moved immediately to the Colorado as Panathinaikos had a debt with the player; they accepted an offer of €150,000 for the transfer of the player.

== International career ==
On 19 April 2013, Moledo was called up to the Brazil national team by coach Luiz Felipe Scolari for Brazil's 24 April friendly against Chile as a replacement for Henrique, who was playing a match for his club the next day.

However, CONMEBOL moved Palmeiras game to the next week, allowing Scolari to recall Henrique while keeping Moledo in the squad.

== Honours ==
Internacional

- Recopa Sudamericana: 2011
- Campeonato Gaúcho: 2012, 2013

Individual

- Super League Greece Team of the Season: 2015–16, 2016–17
