= Lucas Villafáñez =

Greek footballer

Personal information
- Full name: Lucas Martín Villafáñez
- Date of birth: 4 October 1991 (age 35)
- Place of birth: Comodoro Rivadavia, Chubut, Argentina
- Height: 1.71 m (5 ft 7 in)
- Position: Attacking midfielder

Team information
- Current team: Athens Kallithea
- Number: 11

Youth career
- 2002-2008: CAI

Senior career*
Years	Team	Apps	(Gls)
2008–2010	CAI	55	(11)
2010–2011	→ Independiente (loan)	8	(2)
2011–2016	Independiente	23	(0)
2013–2014	→ Huracán (loan)	20	(2)
2014–2016	→ Panetolikos (loan)	38	(11)
2016–2018	Panathinaikos	63	(9)
2018–2019	Alanyaspor	47	(1)
2019–2020	Morelia	16	(2)
2020–2022	Panathinaikos	52	(3)
2022–2024	APOEL	45	(4)
2024–2025	Volos	14	(0)
2025–2026	A.E. Kifisia	20	(0)
2026–	Athens Kallithea	3	(0)

International career
2011	Argentina U20	1	(1)
2011	Argentina U22	5	(1)
- * Club domestic league appearances and goals as of 20 September 2026

Lucas Martín Villafáñez ([biʝaˈfaɲes]; born 4 October 1991) is an Argentine professional footballer who plays as an attacking midfielder for Greek Super League 2 club Athens Kallithea.

== Club career ==
Villafáñez made his professional debut in the Primera B Nacional with his hometown club Comisión de Actividades Infantiles, when he was 16 years old. In total he played 57 games with the club, scoring 12 goals.

In 2010, Independiente acquired the player on a one-year loan deal. He debuted in the Argentine Primera División on a 0–1 defeat to Tigre for the 2010 Apertura, despite the game being played in February 2011.

On 2 May 2011, Villafáñez scored his first goal with Independiente, in a 1–1 draw with Boca Juniors.

In summer 2013, the hitch that had a contract until June 2014 and would not be taken into account by Miguel Angel Brindisi was asked by Antonio Mohamed after his arrival in Huracán F.C. and eventually would be signing with the "Globe". After several days of negotiation and obstacles, it was finally decided that Villafáñez would go on loan to Huracán F.C. for the 2013–14 season. On 1 August 2014, Villafáñez signed a two-year contract with Greek Super League side Panetolikos on loan from Independiente, along with his former Independiente teammates Fernando Godoy and Nicolás Martinez.

In December 2015, Villafáñez was linked with a move to AEK Athens. On 24 January 2016, he scored with a close-range effort at the beginning of a match against Veria which Panetolikos won 1–0 and scooped its first away victory since August 2015.

=== Panathinaikos ===
On 27 January 2016, Panathinaikos bought the Villafáñez's playing rights from Independiente, so from the summer of 2016, he would have belonged to the "Greens". Panetolikos, however, wanted to make a profit form the player's transfer and gave him to Panathinaikos from 1 February. On 6 March 2016, he scored his first goal with the club in a 2–0 home win against Atromitos. On 28 October 2017, thanks to a close-range effort by the Argentinian attacking midfielder, Panathinaikos won 1–0 at Super League derby clash against champions Olympiacos. On 7 January 2018, Marinos Ouzounidis’ team, which had last tasted victory in the Super League back on 28 October with a 1–0 derby win over Olympiacos, finally stopped the rot in the first game of 2018 thanks to a pair of penalties from Villafáñez in a 2–0 win home game against Platanias.

On 14 January 2018, with Panathinaikos in financial difficulties, French website "Foot Mercato" reported Villafáñez had been offered to three Ligue 1 clubs, namely Nantes, Saint-Étienne and Toulouse for the January transfer window on a loan basis till the end of the season with a purchase option in the range of €2 million for the summer of 2018.

Villafáñez left the club having 73 appearances (10 goals, 13 assists) in all competitions.

=== Alanyaspor ===
On 23 January 2018, Turkish club Alanyaspor initially offered an €800,000 transfer fee to Panathinaikos for Villafáñez. The transfer offer involved two Greek internationals, Giorgos Tzavellas and Giannis Maniatis. According to various sources, the transfer could be set in the range of €1.1 million, with Villafáñez agreeing to a 2.5-year contract, with annual earnings levelled to €800,000 per year. After three days of negotiations, Panathinaikos agreed with Alanyaspor for a total transfer amount of €1.2 million. The financial struggling Greens will receive a net amount of €900,000, as Villafáñez ex-club Panetolikos retained a 10% resale rate, while from the total transfer amount Panathinaikos will cover his debt both to the player's rights from Independiente and his annual delayed salary. On 27 January 2018, two days after his arrival, he made his debut with the club as a starter in a 3–1 home win game against Alanyaspor. On 18 May 2018, in the last matchday of the season he scored his first goal with the club in a 3–2 home win game against Antalyaspor.

=== Morelia ===
On 3 July 2019, Monarcas Morelia presented Villafáñez as their new player.

=== Return to Panathinaikos ===
In July 2020, Villafáñez returned to the Greek giants Panathinaikos F.C. with a two-year deal from Monarcas Morelia.

== International career ==
Villafáñez was part of Sergio Batista's Argentina U20 in 2010. In 2011, he was selected to represent Argentina at the FIFA U-20 World Cup.

Villafanez also is of partial-Greek descent, expressed his desire to play for Greece, through his maternal great-grandfather, who was born in Piraeus. In 2014, Villafáñez started the procedure in order to claim the Greek citizenship. In December 2017, he was in the final stages for acquiring the citizenship and was to be available for the national team.

== Career statistics ==
=== Club ===
As of 7 April 2024

Club performance			League		National Cup		Continental		Total	
Club	Season	Division	Apps	Goals	Apps	Goals	Apps	Goals	Apps	Goals
CAI	2008-09	Primera B Nacional	25	4	—		—		25	4
CAI	2009-10	Primera B Nacional	30	7	—		—		30	7
CAI	Total		55	11	—		—		55	11
Independiente (loan)	2010-11	Argentine Primera División	8	2	—		—		8	2
Independiente	2011-12	Argentine Primera División	13	0	1 (Note: Appearance(s) in Copa Argentina)	0	—		14	0
Independiente	2012-13	Argentine Primera División	10	0	1	0	4 (Note: Appearance(s) in Copa Sudamericana)	1	15	1
Independiente	Total		23	0	2	0	4	1	29	1
Huracán (loan)	2013-14	Primera B Nacional	20	2	1	0	—		21	2
Panetolikos (loan)	2014-15	Super League Greece	19	6	—		—		19	6
Panetolikos (loan)	2015-16	Super League Greece	19	5	2 (Note: Appearance(s) in Greek Cup)	1	—		21	6
Panetolikos (loan)	Total		38	11	2	1	—		40	12
Panathinaikos	2015-16	Super League Greece	11	2	1	0	—		12	2
Panathinaikos	2016-17	Super League Greece	30	2	7	1	9 (Note: Appearance(s) in UEFA Europa League)	0	46	3
Panathinaikos	2017-18	Super League Greece	12	5	3	0	0	0	15	5
Panathinaikos	Total		53	9	11	1	9	0	73	10
Alanyaspor	2017-18	Süper Lig	15	1	—		—		15	1
Alanyaspor	2018-19	Süper Lig	32	0	4 (Note: Appearance(s) in Turkish Cup)	5	—		36	5
Alanyaspor	Total		47	1	4	5	—		51	6
Morelia	2019-20	Liga MX	16	2	6 (Note: Appearance(s) in Copa MX)	1	—		22	3
Panathinaikos	2020-21	Super League Greece	26	2	2	0	—		28	2
Panathinaikos	2021-22	Super League Greece	26	1	7	0	—		33	1
Panathinaikos	Total		52	3	9	0	—		61	3
APOEL	2022-23	Cyta Championship	18	0	1 (Note: Appearance(s) in Cypriot Cup)	0	4 (Note: Appearance(s) in UEFA Europa Conference League)	0	23	0
APOEL	2023-24	Cyta Championship	27	4	1	0	6	0	34	4
APOEL	Total		45	4	2	0	10	0	57	4
Career Total			357	45	37	8	23	1	417	54

== Honours ==
Panathinaikos

- Greek Cup: 2021–22
