= 2016–17 Panathinaikos F.C. season =

Panathinaikos
2016–17 season
- Chairman: Giannis Alafouzos
- Manager: Marinos Ouzounidis
- Stadium: Leoforos Alexandras Stadium
- Super League Greece: 3rd
- Greek Cup: Semi-finals
- UEFA Europa League: Group stage
- Top goalscorer: League: Marcus Berg (22); All: Marcus Berg (31)
- Highest home attendance: 13,666
- Lowest home attendance: 1,398
- Average home league attendance: 5,879
Home colours	Away colours	Third colours

The 2016–17 Panathinaikos season is the club's 58th consecutive season in Super League Greece. They are also competing in the UEFA Europa League and Greek Cup.

== Players ==
No.	Name	Nationality	Position (s)	Date of birth (age)	Signed from	Notes
Goalkeepers
1	Stefanos Kotsolis	(Greece)	GK	5 June 1979 (37)	(Cyprus) Omonia	Originally from youth system
15	Luke Steele	(England)	GK	24 September 1984 (30)	(England) Barnsley	
61	Vasilios Xenopoulos	(Greece)	GK	20 May 1998 (18)	Youth system	
99	Odisseas Vlachodimos	(Greece)	GK	26 April 1994 (22)	(Germany) VfB Stuttgart	
Defenders
2	Jens Wemmer	(Germany)	RB	31 October 1985(31)	(Germany) SC Paderborn	
3	Diamantis Chouchoumis	(Greece)	LB / LM	17 July 1994 (21)	Youth system	
4	Georgios Koutroumpis	(Greece)	CB	10 February 1991 (25)	(Greece) AEK Athens	
6	Christopher Samba	(France)	CB	28 March 1984 (33)	(Russia) Dynamo Moscow	
12	Nikos Marinakis	(Greece)	RB	12 September 1993 (23)	Youth system	
23	Niklas Hult	(Sweden)	LB / LM	13 February 1990 (age 26)	(France) Nice	
25	Rasmus Thelander	(Denmark)	CB	9 July 1991 (25)	(Denmark) Aalborg BK	
27	Giandomenico Mesto	(Italy)	RB	25 May 1982 (34)	(Italy) Napoli	
31	Rodrigo Moledo	(Brazil)	CB	27 October 1987 (28)	(Brazil) Internacional	
41	Stefanos Evangelou	(Greece)	CB	12 May 1998 (18)	(Greece) Panionios	
51	Ivan Ivanov	(Bulgaria)	CB	25 February 1988 (29)	(Bulgaria) Lokomotiv Plovdiv	
78	Ousmane Coulibaly	(Mali)	RB / LB	9 July 1989 (age 27)	(Greece) Platanias	
Midfielders
5	Nuno Reis	(Portugal)	DM	31 January 1991 (age 25)	(France) Metz	
7	Olivier Boumal	(Cameroon)	RW / LW	17 September 1989 (26)	(Greece) Panionios	
10	Zeca	(Greece)	CM	31 August 1988 (25)	(Portugal) Vitória de Setúbal	
11	Sebastián Leto	(Argentina)	W / F	30 August 1986 (30)	(Italy) Catania	
17	Robin Lod	(Finland)	CM	17 April 1993 (23)	(Finland) HJK Helsinki	
18	Christos Donis	(Greece)	CM	9 October 1994 (22)	Youth system	
19	Lucas Villafáñez	(Argentina)	W / AM	4 October 1991 (24)	(Argentina) Independiente	
21	Dimitrios Kourbelis	(Greece)	DM	2 November 1993 (23)	(Greece) Asteras Tripolis	
22	Mubarak Wakaso	(Ghana)	LM / CM	25 July 1990 (age 25)	(Russia) Rubin Kazan	
24	Cristian Ledesma	(Italy)	CM	24 September 1982(34)	(Brazil) Santos	
34	Paschalis Staikos	(Greece)	CM / DM	8 February 1996 (20)	Youth system	
40	Paul-José M'Poku	(Belgium)	RW / LW	19 April 1992 (24)	(Italy) Chievo	On loan
Forwards
8	Guillermo Molins	(Sweden)	W / OF	26 September 1988 (age 28)	(China) Beijing Renhe	
9	Marcus Berg	(Sweden)	CF	17 August 1986 (30)	(Germany) Hamburger SV	
14	Viktor Klonaridis	(Belgium)	RW / LW	28 July 1992 (24)	(France) Lens	On loan
20	Lautaro Rinaldi	(Argentina)	ST	30 December 1993 (23)	(Argentina) Argentinos Juniors	
32	Victor Ibarbo	(Colombia)	LW	19 May 1990 (26)	(Italy) Cagliari	On loan
71	Panagiotis Vlachodimos	(Greece)	RW / LW	12 October 1991 (24)	(France) Nîmes	

=== Out of team with contract ===
No.	Name	Nationality	Position (s)	Date of birth (age)	Signed from	Notes
16	Stathis Tavlaridis	(Greece)	CB	25 January 1980(37)	(Greece) Atromitos	

== Transfers ==
=== In ===
Date	Squad #	Position	Player	Transferred from	Fee	Source
31 June 2016	14	M	(Nigeria) Abdul Jeleel Ajagun	(Greece) Levadiakos	End of loan	
31 June 2016	18	CM	(Greece) Christos Donis	(Switzerland) Lugano	End of loan	
28 June 2016	51	CB	(Bulgaria) Ivan Ivanov	(Bulgaria) Lokomotiv Plovdiv	€200,000	
30 June 2016	23	LB	(Sweden) Niklas Hult	(France) Nice	€300,000	
30 June 2016	8	F	(Colombia) Víctor Ibarbo	(Italy) Cagliari	Loan (€1,000,000 )	
4 July 2016	5	CB	(Portugal) Nuno Reis	(France) Metz	Free	
9 July 2016	22	LM	(Ghana) Mubarak Wakaso	(Russia) Rubin Kazan	Free	
14 July 2016	24	DM	(Italy) Cristian Ledesma	(Brazil) Santos	Free	
4 August 2016	20	ST	(Argentina) Lautaro Rinaldi	(Argentina) Argentinos Juniors	€300,000	
31 August 2016	78	RB	(Mali) Ousmane Coulibaly	(Greece) Platanias	€250,000	
31 August 2016	6	CB	(Republic of the Congo) Christopher Samba	(Russia) Dynamo Moscow	Free	
31 August 2016	40	W	(Democratic Republic of the Congo) Paul-José M'Poku	(Italy) Chievo	Loan	
23 December 2016	21	DM	(Greece) Dimitrios Kourbelis	(Greece) Asteras Tripolis	€500.000	

Total spending: ▼€2,550,000

=== Out ===
Date	Squad #	Position	Player	Transferred To	Fee	Source
1 June 2016	95	MF	(Brazil) Lucas Evangelista	(Italy) Udinese	End of loan	
1 June 2016	77	ST	(Brazil) Yuri Mamute	(Brazil) Grêmio	End of loan	
1 June 2016	32	MF	(Croatia) Danijel Pranjić	(Slovenia) Koper	End of contract	
1 June 2016	33	ST	(Croatia) Mladen Petrić		Retired	
10 June 2016	61	GK	(Greece) Konstantinos Kotsaris	(Cyprus) Omonia	Loan	
22 June 2016	24	DF	(Spain) Sergio Sánchez	(Russia) Rubin Kazan	Free	
25 June 2016	8	DM	(Greece) Anastasios Lagos	(Germany) Würzburger Kickers	Free	
25 June 2016	23	FW	(Greece) Nikos Kaltsas	(Greece) Asteras Tripolis	€180,000	
28 June 2016	18	MF	(Greece) Christos Donis	(Greece) PAS Giannina	Loan	
30 June 2016	14	MF	(Nigeria) Abdul Jeleel Ajagun	(Netherlands) Roda JC	Loan	
28 July 2016	45	GK	(Greece) Nikos Giannakopoulos	(Cyprus) Aris Limassol	Loan	
25 August 2016	21	DF	(Spain) Nano	(Spain) Almería	Free	
31 August 2016	6	MF	(Algeria) Mehdi Abeid	(France) Dijon	€250,000	
31 August 2016	28	FW	(Greece) Viktor Klonaridis	(France) Lens	€150,000	
15 September 2016	2	CM	(Ghana) Michael Essien		Retired	
28 December 2016	24	DM	(Italy) Cristian Ledesma		Free	

Total income: ▲€580,000

== Pre-season and friendlies ==
1 July 2016 Friendly	Alemannia Aachen	2–2	Panathinaikos	Tegelen, Netherlands
19:00	Fejzullahu 4', 20'	Report	Lod 29'; Villafáñez 60'	Stadium: Tegelen

4 July 2016 Friendly	Silvolde	0–2	Panathinaikos	Tegelen, Netherlands
19:00		Report	Villafáñez 10'; Leto 70' (pen.)	Stadium: Tegelen

7 July 2016 Friendly	Panathinaikos	1–1	Osmanlıspor	Tegelen, Netherlands
19:00	Lod 75'	Report	Rusescu 88'	Stadium: Tegelen

13 July 2016 Friendly	Fenerbahçe	2–1	Panathinaikos	Istanbul, Turkey
21:00	Emenike 3', 54'	Report	Berg 23'	Stadium: Şükrü Saracoğlu Stadium

20 July 2016 Friendly	Panathinaikos	4–0	Zwolle	Athens, Greece
21:00	Ledesma 7'; Lod 37'; Wakaso 40'; Berg 66'	Report		Stadium: Leoforos Alexandras Stadium

11 August 2016 Friendly	Omonia	3–0	Panathinaikos	Nicosia, Cyprus
	Derbyshire 25'; Agayev 56'; Sheridan 79'			Stadium: GSP Stadium

== Competitions ==
=== Super League Greece ===
==== Regular season ====
===== League table =====
Pos	Team	Pld	W	D	L	GF	GA	GD	Pts	Qualification or relegation
1	Olympiacos (C)	30	21	4	5	57	16	+41	67	Qualification for the Champions League third qualifying round
2	PAOK (Note: PAOK were deducted three points as they did not show up to the second semi-final match against Olympiacos in last year's Greek Cup.)	30	20	4	6	52	19	+33	61	Qualification for the Play-offs
3	Panathinaikos	30	16	9	5	45	19	+26	57	Qualification for the Play-offs
4	AEK Athens	30	14	11	5	54	23	+31	53	Qualification for the Play-offs
5	Panionios	30	15	7	8	35	23	+12	52	Qualification for the Play-offs

Source: Super League Greece
Rules for classification: 1) Points; 2) Head-to-head points; 3) Head-to-head goal difference; 4) Goals scored; 5) Goals against; 6) Play-offs (neutral ground); 7) Draw.
(Note: Criteria 6 is only used if needed to decide champion, teams for relegation or teams for UEFA competitions).
(C) Champions

===== Matches =====
Win Draw Loss Postponed

5 January 2017 1	Platanias	1–0	Panathinaikos	Chania
19:30	Manousos (yellow card) 42'; Kargas (yellow card) 56'; Banana 74'; Pryndeta (yellow card) 83'; Sotiriou (yellow card) 90+5'	Report	Mesto (yellow card) 37'; Villafáñez (yellow card) 88'; Rinaldi (yellow card) 90'	Stadium: Perivolia Municipal Stadium; Attendance: 2,196; Referee: Praxitelis Zachariadis

9 January 2017 2	Panathinaikos	1–0	PAE Kerkyra	Athens
19:30	Kourbelis (yellow card) 45'; Moledo (yellow card) 79'; Leto 83'	Report	Georgiou (yellow card) 41'; Zaradoukas (yellow card) 88'	Stadium: Leoforos Alexandras Stadium; Attendance: 1,398; Referee: Christos Granas

10 September 2016 3	Levadiakos	0–3	Panathinaikos	Levadia
20:30		Report	Ledesma 8' (pen.); Wakaso 36'; Leto 74'	Stadium: Levadia Municipal Stadium; Attendance: 1.871; Referee: Anastasios Sidiropoulos

18 September 2016 4	Panathinaikos	4–0	PAS Giannina	Athens
16:00	Berg 38', 76'; Coulibaly (yellow card) 51'; Lod 54'; Moledo (yellow card) 75'; Leto 88'	Report	Paschalakis (red card) 22'; Berios (yellow card) 75'	Stadium: Leoforos Alexandras Stadium; Attendance: 7.142; Referee: Spyros Selimos

24 September 2016 5	Panetolikos	0–0	Panathinaikos	Agrinio
20:30	Makos (yellow card) 18'; Clésio (yellow card) 22'	Report	Wakaso (yellow card) 39'; Zeca (yellow card) 90+5'	Stadium: Panetolikos Stadium; Attendance: 4,179; Referee: Giorgos Kominis

2 October 2016 6	Panathinaikos	3–1	Asteras Tripolis	Athens
18:15	Berg 1'; Hult (yellow card) 25'; Ledesma 39' (pen.), 88' (pen.); Koutroumpis (yellow card) 56'; Ivanov (yellow card) 66'	Report	Fariña (red card) 55'; Ioannidis 67' (pen.); Hamdani (yellow card) 69'; Kourbelis (yellow card) 81'; Stanisavljević (yellow card) 87'	Stadium: Leoforos Alexandras Stadium; Attendance: 9,786; Referee: Charalambos Kalogeropoulos

16 October 2016 7	Panathinaikos	1–2	Xanthi	Athens
16:00	Wakaso (yellow card) 33'; Mesto (yellow card) 38'; Zeca (yellow card) 49'; Leto 62'; Moledo (yellow card) 69'	Report	Chatziterzoglu (yellow card) 25'; Lucas 34'; Vasilakakis 66'; Lisgaras (yellow card) 71'; Baxevanidis (yellow card) 76'; Nieto (yellow card) 85'	Stadium: Leoforos Alexandras Stadium; Attendance: 9,524; Referee: Giorgos Foukakis

24 October 2016 8	Veria	1–1	Panathinaikos	Veria
19:30	Sissoko (yellow card) 68'; Balafas 88'; Navalovski (yellow card) 90'	Report	Berg 13'; Villafáñez (yellow card) 55'	Stadium: Veria Stadium; Attendance: 2.439; Referee: Xristos Gkranas

30 October 2016 9	Panathinaikos	2–0	Iraklis	Athens
15:00	Wakaso (yellow card) 21'; Reis (yellow card) 41'; Leto (yellow card) 45' (goal) 58'; M'Poku 62'	Report	Monteiro (yellow card) 28'; Intzoglou (yellow card) 50'; Bartolini (yellow card) 83'; Angelopoulos (yellow card) 90+4'	Stadium: Leoforos Alexandras Stadium; Attendance: 5.946; Referee: Georgios Kyzas

6 November 2016 10	Olympiacos	3–0	Panathinaikos	Piraeus
19:30	Retsos (yellow card) 14'; Botia 21'; Elyounoussi 26'; Milivojević (yellow card) 34'; Ideye 44'; Figueiras (yellow card) 69'	Report	Moledo (yellow card) 11'; Koutroumpis (yellow card) 32'; Ledesma (yellow card) 56'; Ibarbo (yellow card) 83'; Rinaldi (yellow card) 90+4'	Stadium: Karaiskakis Stadium; Attendance: 31.283; Referee: Anastasios Sidiropoulos

15 January 2017 11	Panathinaikos	0–0	AEK Athens	Athens
19:30		Report		Stadium: Leoforos Alexandras Stadium

27 November 2016 12	Panionios	1–1	Panathinaikos	Athens
19:30	Tasoulis (yellow card) 58'; Ansarifard 71'	Report	Ivanov (yellow card) 40'; Reis (yellow card) 67'; Villafáñez 90+3'	Stadium: Nea Smyrni Stadium; Attendance: 1.007; Referee: Giorgos Kominis

4 December 2016 13	Panathinaikos	1–0	PAOK	Athens
19:30	Coulibaly (yellow card) 32'; Lod 69'; Leto (yellow card) 77'; Moledo (yellow card) 81'	Report	Leovac (yellow card) 22'	Stadium: Leoforos Alexandras Stadium; Attendance: 5,221; Referee: Anastasios Papapetrou

11 December 2016 14	Atromitos	0–1	Panathinaikos	Athens
19:30	Fytanidis (yellow card) 22'	Report	Zeca (yellow card) 34'; Ibarbo (yellow card) 42'; Berg 45'; M'Poku (yellow card) 57'; Reis (yellow card) 88'	Stadium: Peristeri Stadium; Attendance: 0(played behind closed doors); Referee: Anastasios Sidiropoulos

18 December 2016 15	AEL	0–0	Panathinaikos	Larissa
19:30	Nazlidis (yellow card) 33'; Rentzas (yellow card) 90'	Report	Berg (yellow card) 8'; Boumal (yellow card) 12'; Zeca (yellow card) 59' (yellow-red card) 81'; (yellow card) 80' Leto; Mesto (yellow card) 90'	Stadium: AEL FC Arena; Attendance: 3.929; Referee: Ioannis Papadopoulos

19 January 2017 16	Panathinaikos	2–1	Platanias	Athens
19:30	Berg 26' (pen.); Berg 29'		Giakoumakis 37'	Stadium: Leoforos Alexandras Stadium

22 January 2017 17	PAE Kerkyra	1–1	Panathinaikos	Corfu
19:30	Epstein 29'		Berg 21'	Stadium: Kerkyra Stadium; Referee: TBA

29 January 2017 18	Panathinaikos	0–0	Levadiakos	Athens
15:00				Stadium: Leoforos Alexandras Stadium

4 February 2017 19	PAS Giannina	1–1	Panathinaikos	Ioannina
	Conde 31'		Berg 56'	Stadium: Zosimades Stadium

12 February 2017 20	Panathinaikos	4–0	Panetolikos	Athens
	Berg 67', 80', 90'; Lod 89'			Stadium: Leoforos Alexandras Stadium

18 February 2017 21	Asteras Tripolis	0–5	Panathinaikos	Tripoli
			Klonaridis 7'; Berg 9'; Moledo 30'; M'Poku 39'; Boumal 83'	Stadium: Theodoros Kolokotronis Stadium

25 February 2017 22	Xanthi	1–0	Panathinaikos	Xanthi
	Vasilakakis 67'			Stadium: Skoda Xanthi Arena

4 March 2017 23	Panathinaikos	5–0	Veria	Athens
	Berg 18' (pen.), 39' (pen.), 41', 57'; Klonaridis 21'; Berg			Stadium: Leoforos Alexandras Stadium

11 Μarch 2017 24	Iraklis	1–1	Panathinaikos	Thessaloniki
	Perrone 72'		Berg 37' (pen.)	Stadium: Kaftanzoglio Stadium

19 March 2017 25	Panathinaikos	1–0	Olympiacos	Athens
	Berg 15'			Stadium: Leoforos Alexandras Stadium; Attendance: 13.666; Referee: Giorgos Kominis

2 April 2017 26	AEK Athens	2–3	Panathinaikos	Athens
	Christodoulopoulos 61' (pen.); Pekhart 78'		Klonaridis 24'; Berg 27', 90'	Stadium: Olympic Stadium; Attendance: 18.526; Referee: I. Papadopoulos; Man of the Match: Tomáš Pekhart (Czech Republic)

6 April 2017 27	Panathinaikos	1–0	Panionios	Athens
17:15	Berg 74' (pen.)			Stadium: Leoforos Alexandras Stadium

9 April 2017 28	PAOK	3–0	Panathinaikos	Thessaloniki
19:30	Shakhov (yellow card) 2' (goal) 30'; Henrique 18' (yellow card) 69'; Leovac 27' (yellow card) 53'; Warda (yellow card) 42'		Klonaridis (yellow card) 27'; Molins (yellow card) 35'; Boumal (yellow card) 40'; M'Poku (yellow card) 70'	Stadium: Toumba Stadium; Attendance: 17.209; Referee: Dimitris Styliaras

23 April 2017 29	Panathinaikos	1–0	Atromitos	Athens
	Molins 86'			Stadium: Leoforos Alexandras Stadium

30 April 2017 30	Panathinaikos	2–0	AEL	Athens
				Stadium: Leoforos Alexandras Stadium

==== Play-offs ====
===== Table =====
Pos	Team	Pld	W	D	L	GF	GA	GD	Pts	Qualification
2	AEK Athens	6	4	0	2	5	3	+2	12	Qualification for the Champions League third qualifying round
3	Panathinaikos (Note: Panathinaikos were deducted 3 points due to fan behavior against PAOK.)	6	3	1	2	6	7	−1	8	Qualification for the Europa League third qualifying round (Note: PAOK qualified for the Europa League third qualifying round by winning the Greek Cup.)
4	PAOK (Note: PAOK were deducted 6 points due to fan behavior against AEK Athens in Greek Cup final.)	6	3	0	3	7	5	+2	5	Qualification for the Europa League third qualifying round
5	Panionios	6	1	1	4	3	6	−3	4	Qualification for the Europa League second qualifying round

Source: Super League Greece: Standings, Schedule
Rules for classification: 1) Points; 2) Head-to-head points; 3) Head-to-head goal difference; 4) Goals scored; 5) Goals against; 6) Regular season position.

===== Matches =====
14 May 2017 1	Panionios	1–1	Panathinaikos	Athens
18:15				Stadium: Nea Smyrni Stadium

17 May 2017 2	Panathinaikos	0–3	PAOK	Athens
20:30				Stadium: Leoforos Alexandras Stadium

21 May 2017 3	AEK Athens	1–0	Panathinaikos	Athens
20:30				Stadium: Olympic Stadium

24 May 2017 4	Panathinaikos	1–0	AEK Athens	Athens
20:30				Stadium: Leoforos Alexandras Stadium

28 May 2017 5	Panathinaikos	1–0	Panionios	Athens
18:15				Stadium: Leoforos Alexandras Stadium

31 May 2017 6	PAOK	2–3	Panathinaikos	Thessaloniki
20:30				Stadium: Toumba Stadium

=== Greek Cup ===
==== Group C ====
Pos	Team	Pld	W	D	L	GF	GA	GD	Pts	Qualification
1	OFI	3	2	0	1	4	3	+1	6	Round of 16
2	Panathinaikos	3	1	1	1	5	5	0	4	Round of 16
3	Iraklis	3	1	1	1	4	2	+2	4	
4	Apollon Smyrnis	3	1	0	2	4	7	−3	3	

Source: epo.gr

27 October 2016 1	Panathinaikos	0–0	Iraklis	Athens
19:30	Ivanov (yellow card) 38'; Villafáñez (yellow card) 85'; Reis (yellow card) 90+3'; Leto (yellow card) 90+6'	Report	Pasas (yellow card) 38'; Monteiro (yellow card) 76'; Vosnakidis (yellow card) 84'; Bletsas (yellow card) 88'	Stadium: Leoforos Alexandras Stadium; Referee: Dimitrios Karantonis

30 November 2016 2	OFI	2–1	Panathinaikos	Heraklion
19:30	Komesidis (yellow card) 29'; Chanti (yellow card) 45'; Chanti 69'; Ogboe 84'; Vallianos (yellow card) 90'; Dafkos (yellow card) 90+3'	Report	Zeca (yellow card) 27'; Berg 31'	Stadium: Th. Vardinogiannis Stadium

14 December 2016 3	Apollon Smyrnis	3–4	Panathinaikos	Athens
19:30	Siatravanis 11', 43', 76'	Report	Berg 54'; M'Poku 61'; Leto 65'; Dasios 74' (o.g.)	Stadium: Georgios Kamaras Stadium; Referee: A.Tzilos

==== Round of 16 ====
12 January 2017 First leg	Panathinaikos	3–0	Kissamikos	Athens
19:30	Chouchoumis (yellow card) 13'; Berg 49'; Leto 74', 90'; Xatzigiovanis (yellow card) 83'		Tserkezos (yellow card) 16'; Pantelakis (yellow card) 74'	Stadium: Leoforos Alexandras Stadium; Referee: Nikolaos Poulimas

24 January 2017 Second leg	Kissamikos	0–4 (0–7 agg.)	Panathinaikos	Maleme
			Klonaridis 42'; Xatzigiovanis 57'; Pispas 78'; Boumale 79'	Stadium: Maleme Stadium

==== Quarter-finals ====
8 February 2017 First leg	Panathinaikos	4–0	Asteras Tripolis	Athens
17:15 UTC +2	Reis 6'; Klonaridis 32'; Villafáñez 61'; M'Poku 68' (pen.)			Stadium: Leoforos Alexandras Stadium

1 March 2017 Second leg	Asteras Tripolis	0–1 (0–5 agg.)	Panathinaikos	Tripoli
17:15 UTC +2			Marinakis 92'	Stadium: Theodoros Kolokotronis Stadium

==== Semi-finals ====
12 April 2017 First leg	Panathinaikos	2–0	PAOK	Athens
19:00 EET				Stadium: Leoforos Alexandras Stadium

27 April 2017 Second leg	PAOK	4–0 (4–2 agg.)	Panathinaikos	Thessaloniki
19:00 EET				Stadium: Toumba Stadium

=== UEFA Europa League ===
==== Qualifying phase ====
===== Third qualifying round =====
28 July 2016 First leg	Panathinaikos (Greece)	1–0	(Sweden) AIK	Athens, Greece
21:00	Wakaso (yellow card) 59'; Moledo 79'; Mesto (yellow card) 85'	Report	Hauksson (yellow card) 25'; Kpozo (yellow card) 28'; Johansson (yellow card) 90+4'	Stadium: Leoforos Alexandras Stadium; Attendance: 12.021; Referee: Bastian Dankert

4 August 2016 Second leg	AIK (Sweden)	0–2 (0–3 agg.)	(Greece) Panathinaikos	Stockholm, Sweden
20:00	Johansson (yellow card) 42'; Ofori (yellow card) 48'; Markkanen (yellow card) 50'	Report	Ledesma (yellow card) 16'; Ibarbo 46'; Koutroumpis (yellow card) 67'; Berg 73'; Steele (yellow card) 81'	Stadium: Tele2 Arena; Attendance: 15.175; Referee: Tony Chapron

===== Play-off round =====
18 August 2016 First leg	Panathinaikos (Greece)	3–0	(Denmark) Brøndby	Athens, Greece
21:00	Koutroumpis (yellow card) 4'; Wakaso (yellow card) 31'; Berg 45', 82'; Ledesma 54' (pen.)	Report	Crone (yellow card) 9' (yellow-red card) 33' Crone; Albrechtsen (yellow card) 37'; Ronnow (red card) 50'	Stadium: Leoforos Alexandras Stadium; Attendance: 11.072; Referee: Istvan Vad

25 August 2016 Second leg	Brøndby (Denmark)	1–1 (1–4 agg.)	(Greece) Panathinaikos	Brøndby, Denmark
	Mukhtar 35'; Hjulsager (yellow card) 45+1'	Report	Wakaso (yellow card) 40'; Koutroumpis (yellow card) 49'; Ivanov 66'	Stadium: Brøndby Stadium; Attendance: 13.521; Referee: Oliver Drachta

==== Group G ====
Pos	Team	Pld	W	D	L	GF	GA	GD	Pts	Qualification	AJX	CLT	STL	PAN
1	(Netherlands) Ajax	6	4	2	0	11	6	+5	14	Advance to knockout phase	—	3–2	1–0	2–0
2	(Spain) Celta Vigo	6	2	3	1	10	7	+3	9	Advance to knockout phase	2–2	—	1–1	2–0
3	(Belgium) Standard Liège	6	1	4	1	8	6	+2	7		1–1	1–1	—	2–2
4	(Greece) Panathinaikos	6	0	1	5	3	13	−10	1		1–2	0–2	0–3	—

Source: UEFA

15 September 2016 1	Panathinaikos (Greece)	1–2	(Netherlands) Ajax	Athens, Greece
22:05	Berg 5'; Koutroumpis (yellow card) 35'; Ivanov (yellow card) 59' (yellow-red card) 69'; Wakaso (yellow card) 62' (yellow-red card) 90+1'; Mesto (yellow card) 66'; Zeca (yellow card) 68'; Villafanez (yellow card) 71'	Report	Traore 34'; Viergever (yellow card) 42'; Ziyech (yellow card) 55' (yellow-red card) 79'; Riedewald 67'; Veltman (yellow card) 90+1'	Stadium: Leoforos Alexandras Stadium; Attendance: 13.019; Referee: Andre Marriner

29 September 2016 2	Celta Vigo (Spain)	2–0	(Greece) Panathinaikos	Vigo, Spain
20:00	Cabral (yellow card) 51'; Guidetti 84'; Wass 89'	Report	Zeca (yellow card) 42'; Villafáñez (yellow card) 50'; Samba (yellow card) 87'	Stadium: Estadio Balaídos; Attendance: 15,726; Referee: Luca Banti

20 October 2016 3	Standard Liège (Belgium)	2–2	(Greece) Panathinaikos	Liège, Belgium
20:00	Junior 45' (pen.); Belfodil 82'; Trebel (yellow card) 85'	Report	Ibarbo 13', 36'; Leto (yellow card) 20'; Samba (yellow card) 22'; Zeca (yellow card) 45'; Villafáñez (yellow card) 79'; Ledesma (yellow card) 88'	Stadium: Stade Maurice Dufrasne; Attendance: 14.463; Referee: Daniel Stefański

3 November 2016 4	Panathinaikos (Greece)	0–3	(Belgium) Standard Liège	Athens, Greece
22:05	M'Poku (yellow card) (yellow-red card) 47'; Ivanov (yellow card) 65'; Moledo (yellow card) 67'	Report	Cissé 61'; Sa (yellow card) 66'; Fai (yellow card) 71'; Belfodil 75', 90+3'	Stadium: Leoforos Alexandras Stadium; Attendance: 10,837; Referee: Sergiy Boyoko

24 November 2016 5	Ajax (Netherlands)	2–0	(Greece) Panathinaikos	Amsterdam, Netherlands
20:00	Dijks (yellow card) 15'; Schöne 39'; Tete 50'	Report	Wakaso (yellow card) 13'; Villafáñez (yellow card) 54'	Stadium: Amsterdam Arena; Attendance: 41.011; Referee: Aleksei Eskov

8 December 2016 6	Panathinaikos (Greece)	0–2	(Spain) Celta Vigo	Athens, Greece
22:05	Lod (yellow card) 34'; Wakaso (yellow card) 69'	Report	Guidetti 4'; Orellana 76' (pen.)	Stadium: Leoforos Alexandras Stadium; Attendance: 4,005; Referee: Andris Treimanis
