= 2015–16 AS Roma season =

Roma
2015–16 season
- President: James Pallotta
- Manager: Rudi Garcia (until 13 January); Luciano Spalletti (from 14 January)
- Stadium: Stadio Olimpico
- Serie A: 3rd
- Coppa Italia: Round of 16
- UEFA Champions League: Round of 16
- Top goalscorer: League: Mohamed Salah (14); All: Mohamed Salah (15)
- Highest home attendance: 57,836 vs Barcelona (16 September 2015, Champions League)
- Lowest home attendance: 7,167 vs Spezia (16 December 2015, Coppa Italia)
- Average home league attendance: 35,182
Home colours	Away colours	Third colours

The 2015–16 season was Associazione Sportiva Roma's 88th in existence and 87th season in the top flight of Italian football. The team began the season competing in Serie A, the Coppa Italia, and the UEFA Champions League, but were knocked out in the round of 16 in the latter two competitions. After a run of fourteen wins and three draws in their final seventeen matches, Roma managed to finish the league in third place, qualifying for the play-off round of the 2016–17 UEFA Champions League.

French coach Rudi Garcia began the season as Roma's manager for the third consecutive campaign, but was sacked on 13 January after a run of poor results. Former Roma coach Luciano Spalletti, who was at the club from 2005 to 2009, was hired to replace Garcia.

== Players ==
=== Squad information ===
Last updated on 14 May 2016
Appearances include league matches only

No.	Player	Nat.	Position(s)	Date of birth (age at end of season)	Signed from	Signed in	Contract ends	Apps	Goals
Goalkeepers
1	Bogdan Lobonț	(Romania)	GK	18 January 1978 (aged 38)	(Romania) Dinamo București	2009	2016	22	0
25	Wojciech Szczęsny	(Poland)	GK	18 April 1990 (aged 26)	(England) Arsenal	2015	2016	34	0
26	Morgan De Sanctis	(Italy)	GK	30 March 1977 (aged 39)	(Italy) Napoli	2013	2016	75	0
Defenders
2	Antonio Rüdiger	(Germany)	CB	3 March 1993 (aged 23)	(Germany) VfB Stuttgart	2015	2016	30	2
3	Lucas Digne	(France)	LB	20 July 1993 (aged 22)	(France) Paris Saint-Germain	2015	2016	33	3
5	Leandro Castán	(Brazil)	CB	5 November 1986 (aged 29)	(Brazil) Corinthians	2012	2018	72	1
13	Maicon	(Brazil)	RB	26 July 1981 (aged 34)	(England) Manchester City	2013	2016	57	4
23	Norbert Gyömbér	(Slovakia)	CB / RB / DM	3 July 1992 (aged 23)	(Italy) Catania	2015	2016	6	0
33	Emerson	(Brazil)	LB / LM	13 March 1994 (aged 22)	(Brazil) Santos	2015	2016	8	1
35	Vasilis Torosidis	(Greece)	RB / LB	10 June 1985 (aged 31)	(Greece) Olympiacos	2013	2017	60	4
44	Kostas Manolas	(Greece)	CB	14 June 1991 (aged 25)	(Greece) Olympiacos	2014	2019	67	2
87	Ervin Zukanović	(Bosnia and Herzegovina)	CB / LB	11 February 1987 (aged 29)	(Italy) Sampdoria	2016	2016	9	0
Midfielders
4	Radja Nainggolan	(Belgium)	DM / CM	4 May 1989 (aged 27)	(Italy) Cagliari	2014	2018	87	13
6	Kevin Strootman	(Netherlands)	DM / CM	13 February 1990 (aged 26)	(Netherlands) PSV Eindhoven	2013	2018	36	5
15	Miralem Pjanić	(Bosnia and Herzegovina)	CM / AM	2 March 1990 (aged 26)	(France) Lyon	2011	2018	159	27
16	Daniele De Rossi (Vice-Captain)	(Italy)	DM / CM	24 July 1983 (aged 32)	(Italy) Youth Sector	2001	2017	388	37
20	Seydou Keita	(Mali)	DM / CM	16 January 1980 (aged 36)	(Spain) Valencia	2014	2016	46	3
21	William Vainqueur	(France)	DM / CM	19 November 1988 (aged 27)	(Russia) Dynamo Moscow	2015	2017	16	0
24	Alessandro Florenzi	(Italy)	RB / CM / RW	11 March 1991 (aged 25)	(Italy) Youth Sector	2011	2019	142	21
48	Salih Uçan	(Turkey)	CM / AM	6 January 1994 (aged 22)	(Turkey) Fenerbahçe	2014	2016	7	0
52	Lorenzo Di Livio	(Italy)	CM	11 January 1997 (aged 19)	(Italy) Youth Sector	2016		1	0
Forwards
8	Diego Perotti	(Argentina)	AM / SS / LW / RW	26 July 1988 (aged 27)	(Italy) Genoa	2016	2016	15	3
9	Edin Džeko	(Bosnia and Herzegovina)	CF / ST	17 March 1986 (aged 30)	(England) Manchester City	2015	2016	31	8
10	Francesco Totti (Captain)	(Italy)	AM / LW / SS / CF / ST	27 September 1976 (aged 39)	(Italy) Youth Sector	1992	2016	601	248
11	Mohamed Salah	(Egypt)	LW / RW	15 June 1992 (aged 24)	(England) Chelsea	2015	2016	34	14
14	Iago Falque	(Spain)	LW / RW / SS	4 January 1990 (aged 26)	(Italy) Genoa	2015	2020	22	2
18	Ezequiel Ponce	(Argentina)	CF / ST	29 March 1997 (aged 19)	(Argentina) Newell's Old Boys	2015	2020	0	0
22	Stephan El Shaarawy	(Italy)	LW / RW	27 October 1992 (aged 23)	(Italy) Milan	2016	2016	16	8
92	Edoardo Soleri	(Italy)	CF	19 October 1997 (aged 18)	(Italy) Youth Sector	2015		0	0
93	Marco Tumminello	(Italy)	ST	6 November 1998 (aged 17)	(Italy) Youth Sector	2015	2022	1	0
97	Umar Sadiq	(Nigeria)	CF	2 February 1997 (aged 19)	(Italy) Spezia	2015	2016	6	2
Players transferred during the season
7	Juan Iturbe	(Paraguay)	SS / LW / RW	4 June 1993 (aged 23)	(Italy) Hellas Verona	2014	2019	39	3
19	Víctor Ibarbo	(Colombia)	LW / RW	19 May 1990 (aged 26)	(Italy) Cagliari	2015	2016	10	0
22	Adem Ljajić	(Serbia)	LW / RW / SS / AM	29 September 1991 (aged 24)	(Italy) Fiorentina	2013	2016	61	14
27	Gervinho	(Ivory Coast)	LW / RW / SS	29 September 1991 (aged 24)	(England) Arsenal	2013	2016	71	17

=== Roma Primavera ===
Note: Flags indicate national team as defined under FIFA eligibility rules; some limited exceptions apply. Players may hold more than one non-FIFA nationality.

No.	Pos.	Nation	Player
52	MF	ITA	Lorenzo Pellegrini
56	FW	SVK	Tomáš Vestenický
91	DF	ITA	Arturo Calabresi
92	GK	ITA	Gianluca Marchegiani
93	MF	MLT	Conor Borg
99	MF	MLT	Charles Mizzi

== Transfers ==
=== In ===
Date	Pos.	Player	Age	Moving from	Fee	Notes	Source
23 June 2015	MF	(Italy) Andrea Bertolacci	24	(Italy) Genoa	€8,500,000	Resolved co-ownership	
24 June 2015	MF	(Belgium) Radja Nainggolan	27	(Italy) Cagliari	€9,000,000	Resolved co-ownership	
1 July 2015	DF	(Italy) Alessio Romagnoli	20	(Italy) Sampdoria	Free	Loan return	
1 July 2015	FW	(Spain) Iago Falque	25	(Italy) Genoa	€1,000,000	Full ownership (+ €8M in Summer 2016)	
31 August 2015	MF	(France) William Vainqueur	26	(Russia) Dynamo Moscow	Undisclosed		

==== Loans in ====
Date	Pos.	Player	Age	Moving from	Fee	Notes	Source
3 July 2015	FW	(Colombia) Víctor Ibarbo	25	(Italy) Cagliari	€5,000,000 (option for €8M)	Previous loan extended to June 2016	
29 July 2015	GK	(Poland) Wojciech Szczęsny	25	(England) Arsenal		End of season	
6 August 2015	FW	(Egypt) Mohamed Salah	23	(England) Chelsea	€5,000,000 (option for €18M)	End of season	
12 August 2015	FW	(Bosnia and Herzegovina) Edin Džeko	29	(England) Manchester City	€4,000,000 (option for €11M)	End of season	
19 August 2015	DF	(Germany) Antonio Rüdiger	22	(Germany) VfB Stuttgart	€4,000,000 (option for €9M)	End of season	
20 August 2015	DF	(Slovakia) Norbert Gyömbér	23	(Italy) Catania	Free	End of season	
26 August 2015	DF	(France) Lucas Digne	22	(France) Paris Saint-Germain	€2,500,000 (option to buy undisclosed)	End of season	
31 August 2015	DF	(Brazil) Emerson	21	(Brazil) Santos	Free (option to buy for €1.75M)	End of season	
26 January 2016	FW	(Italy) Stephan El Shaarawy	23	(Italy) Milan	€1,400,000 (option to buy for €13M)	End of season	
29 January 2016	DF	(Bosnia and Herzegovina) Ervin Zukanović	28	(Italy) Sampdoria	€1,200,000 (option to buy for €2.8M)	End of season	
1 February 2016	FW	(Argentina) Diego Perotti	27	(Italy) Genoa	€1,000,000 (option to buy for €9M)	End of season	

Total spending: ▼€42,600,000

=== Out ===
Date	Pos.	Player	Age	Moving to	Fee	Notes	Source
29 June 2015	MF	(Italy) Andrea Bertolacci	24	(Italy) Milan	€20,000,000	Full Ownership	
30 June 2015	MF	(Italy) Federico Viviani	23	(Italy) Hellas Verona	€4,000,000	Full Ownership	
30 June 2015	MF	(Italy) Lorenzo Pellegrini	19	(Italy) Sassuolo	€1,250,000	Full Ownership	
2 July 2015	DF	(Greece) José Holebas	31	(England) Watford	€2,500,000	Full Ownership	
15 July 2015	DF	(Italy) Simone Sini	23	(Italy) Virtus Entella	Undisclosed	Full Ownership	
15 July 2015	FW	(Ivory Coast) Tallo Gadji	22	(France) Lille	Undisclosed		
11 August 2015	DF	(Italy) Alessio Romagnoli	20	(Italy) Milan	€25,000,000	Full Ownership	
17 August 2015	DF	(France) Mapou Yanga-Mbiwa	26	(France) Lyon	€7,900,000	Full Ownership	
20 August 2015	FW	(Italy) Mattia Destro	24	(Italy) Bologna	€6,500,000	Full Ownership	
27 January 2016	LW	(Ivory Coast) Gervinho	28	Hebei China Fortune	€18,000,000 + 1M in bonuses	Full Ownership	

==== Loans out ====
Date	Pos.	Player	Age	Moving to	Fee	Notes	Source
30 June 2015	GK	(Poland) Łukasz Skorupski	24	(Italy) Empoli	Loan	2-year Loan	
2 July 2015	FW	(Italy) Matteo Politano	21	(Italy) Sassuolo	Loan		
3 July 2015	FW	(Sweden) Valmir Berisha	19	(Netherlands) Cambuur	Loan		
9 July 2015	DF	(Romania) Mihai Bălașa	20	(Italy) Crotone	Loan		
9 July 2015	MF	(Italy) Federico Ricci	21	(Italy) Crotone	Loan		
9 July 2015	FW	(Italy) Daniele Verde	19	(Italy) Frosinone	Loan		
10 July 2015	FW	(Italy) Marco Frediani	21	(Italy) Ascoli	Loan		
10 July 2015	DF	(Italy) Michele Somma	20	(Italy) Brescia	Loan		
10 July 2015	DF	(Italy) Luca Mazzitelli	19	(Italy) Brescia	Loan		
12 July 2015	DF	(Italy) Arturo Calabresi	19	(Italy) Livorno	Loan		
13 July 2015	GK	(Italy) Gabriele Marchegiani	19	(Italy) Pistoiese	Loan		
13 July 2015	DF	(Italy) Massimo Sammartino	19	(Italy) Pistoiese	Loan		
17 July 2015	DF	(Serbia) Petar Golubović	21	(Italy) Pisa	Loan		
20 July 2015	FW	(Italy) Jacopo Ferri	20	(Italy) SPAL	Loan		
24 July 2015	FW	(Italy) Stefano Pettinari	23	(Italy) Vicenza	Loan		
30 July 2015	GK	(Lithuania) Tomas Švedkauskas	21	(Italy) Ascoli	Loan		
10 August 2015	FW	(Ivory Coast) Seydou Doumbia	27	(Russia) CSKA Moscow	Loan	6-month loan	
11 August 2015	FW	(Paraguay) Antonio Sanabria	19	(Spain) Sporting Gijón	Loan		
31 August 2015	FW	(Serbia) Adem Ljajić	23	(Italy) Internazionale	€2,000,000	Loan with a mandatory option to buy for a further €9,000,000	
19 December 2015	FW	(Paraguay) Juan Iturbe	22	(England) Bournemouth	€1,500,000	Loan with an option to buy for a further €18,000,000 at the end of the season	

Total income: ▲€88,650,000
Net income: ▲€48,250,000

== Pre-season and friendlies ==
18 July 2015 ICC	Real Madrid (Spain)	0–0 (6–7 p)	(Italy) Roma	Melbourne, Australia
19:00 AEDT (UTC+10)		Report		Stadium: Melbourne Cricket Ground; Attendance: 80,746; Referee: Mark Clattenburg (England)
	Penalties
	Danilo (penalty scored); Kroos (penalty scored); Silva (penalty scored); Isco (penalty scored); Benzema (penalty scored); Nacho (penalty scored); Vázquez (penalty missed)		(penalty scored) Pjanić; (penalty scored) Ljajić; (penalty scored) Destro; (penalty scored) Florenzi; (penalty scored) Iturbe; (penalty scored) Paredes; (penalty scored) Keita

21 July 2015 ICC	Roma (Italy)	2–2 (4–5 p)	(England) Manchester City	Melbourne, Australia
20:00 AEDT (UTC+10:00)	Pjanić 8'; Ljajić 86'	Report	Sterling 3'; Iheanacho 51'	Stadium: Melbourne Cricket Ground; Attendance: 80,746; Referee: Jarred Gillett (Australia)
	Penalties
	Nainggolan (penalty scored); Ljajić (penalty scored); Destro (penalty scored); Falque (penalty scored); Doumbia (penalty missed); Keita (penalty missed)		(penalty scored) Touré; (penalty missed) Kolarov; (penalty scored) Navas; (penalty scored) Lopes; (penalty scored) Hart; (penalty scored) Horsfield

20 May 2016 Friendly	Al Ahly (Egypt)	4–3	(Italy) Roma	Al Ain, United Arab Emirates
09:00 GST (UTC+04:00)	Antwi 13'; Zakaria 42'; Soliman 55'; El Sheikh 90+3'	Report	Džeko 20'; Salah 41'; Vainqueur 90+1'	Stadium: Hazza Bin Zayed Stadium

== Competitions ==
=== Overall ===
Competition	Started round	Final position	First match	Last match
Serie A	Matchday 1	3rd	22 August 2015	14 May 2016
Coppa Italia	Round of 16	Round of 16	16 December 2015	
Champions League	Group stage	Round of 16	16 September 2015	8 March 2016

Last updated: 14 May 2016

=== Serie A ===
==== League table ====
Pos	Team	Pld	W	D	L	GF	GA	GD	Pts	Qualification or relegation
1	Juventus (C)	38	29	4	5	75	20	+55	91	Qualification to Champions League group stage
2	Napoli	38	25	7	6	80	32	+48	82	Qualification to Champions League group stage
3	Roma	38	23	11	4	83	41	+42	80	Qualification to Champions League play-off round
4	Internazionale	38	20	7	11	50	38	+12	67	Qualification to Europa League group stage (Note: Since the winners of the 2015–16 Coppa Italia, Juventus, qualified for European competition based on league position, the spot awarded to the cup winners (Europa League group stage) was passed to fifth-placed team and the spot awarded to the fifth-placed team (Europa League third qualifying round) was passed to the sixth-placed team.)
5	Fiorentina	38	18	10	10	60	42	+18	64	Qualification to Europa League group stage

Source: Serie A, Soccerway
Rules for classification: 1) Points; 2) Head-to-head points; 3) Head-to-head goal difference; 4) Goal difference; 5) Goals scored; 6) Draw.
(C) Champions

==== Results summary ====
Overall								Home						Away					
Pld	W	D	L	GF	GA	GD	Pts	W	D	L	GF	GA	GD	W	D	L	GF	GA	GD
38	23	11	4	83	41	+42	80	13	5	1	44	17	+27	10	6	3	39	24	+15

Last updated: 14 May 2016.
Source: Competitive matches

==== Results by round ====
Round	1	2	3	4	5	6	7	8	9	10	11	12	13	14	15	16	17	18	19	20	21	22	23	24	25	26	27	28	29	30	31	32	33	34	35	36	37	38
Ground	A	H	A	H	A	H	A	H	A	H	A	H	A	H	A	A	H	A	H	H	A	H	A	H	A	H	A	H	A	H	A	H	A	H	H	A	H	A
Result	D	W	W	D	L	W	W	W	W	W	L	W	D	L	D	D	W	D	D	D	L	W	W	W	W	W	W	W	W	D	W	D	D	W	W	W	W	W
Position	11	7	5	4	9	6	4	2	1	1	3	3	4	4	4	5	5	5	5	5	5	5	5	5	4	4	3	3	3	3	3	3	3	3	3	3	3	3

Updated to match(es) played on 14 May 2016. Source: Competitive matches
A = Away; H = Home; W = Win; D = Draw; L = Loss

==== Matches ====
22 August 2015 1	Hellas Verona	1–1	Roma	Verona
18:00 CEST (UTC+02:00)	Souprayen (yellow card) 33'; Juanito (yellow card) 51'; Janković 61'	Report	Florenzi 66'; Castán (yellow card) 87'	Stadium: Stadio Marc'Antonio Bentegodi; Attendance: 22,255; Referee: Marco Guida

30 August 2015 2	Roma	2–1	Juventus	Rome
18:00 CEST (UTC+02:00)	Pjanić (yellow card) 57', (goal) 61'; De Rossi (yellow card) 63'; Džeko (yellow card) 76', (goal) 79'	Report	Pogba (yellow card) 22'; Chiellini (yellow card) 37'; Rubinho (red card) 65'; Evra (yellow card) 74' (yellow-red card) 77'; Dybala 87'	Stadium: Stadio Olimpico; Attendance: 55,040; Referee: Nicola Rizzoli
Note: Rubinho was sent off for dissent while a substitute.

12 September 2015 3	Frosinone	0–2	Roma	Frosinone
18:00 CEST (UTC+02:00)	Diakité (yellow card) 40'; Pavlović (yellow card) 66'; Rosi (yellow card) 76'; Leali (yellow card) 90+4'	Report	Falque (yellow card) 27', (goal) 44'; Totti (yellow card) 39'; De Rossi (yellow card) 64'; Iturbe 90+3'	Stadium: Stadio Matusa; Attendance: 10,000; Referee: Andrea Gervasoni

20 September 2015 4	Roma	2–2	Sassuolo	Rome
15:00 CEST (UTC+02:00)	Totti 36'; Salah 49'; Maicon (yellow card) 57'; De Rossi (yellow card) 73'	Report	Defrel 22'; Politano (yellow card) 40', (goal) 45'; Sansone (yellow card) 86'; Peluso (yellow card) 88'	Stadium: Stadio Olimpico; Attendance: 36,727; Referee: Davide Massa

23 September 2015 5	Sampdoria	2–1	Roma	Genoa
20:45 CEST (UTC+02:00)	Éder (yellow card) 26', (goal) 50'; Fernando (yellow card) 54'; Correa (yellow card) 56'; Barreto (yellow card) 73'; Manolas 85' (o.g.); Mesbah (yellow card) 90+1'; Zukanović (yellow card) 90+4'	Report	De Rossi (yellow card) 30'; Pjanić (yellow card) 45+3'; Digne (yellow card) 52'; Salah 69'	Stadium: Stadio Luigi Ferraris; Attendance: 21,769; Referee: Luca Banti

26 September 2015 6	Roma	5–1	Carpi	Rome
18:00 CEST (UTC+02:00)	Manolas 24'; Pjanić 28'; Gervinho 31'; Salah 51'; Digne 68'; Maicon (yellow card) 76'	Report	Cofie (yellow card) 26'; Borriello 34'	Stadium: Stadio Olimpico; Attendance: 33,430; Referee: Massimiliano Irrati

4 October 2015 7	Palermo	2–4	Roma	Palermo
15:00 CEST (UTC+02:00)	Hiljemark (yellow card) 48'; Gilardino 58', (yellow card) 65'; Chochev (yellow card) 61'; Struna (yellow card) 64'; González 90+1'	Report	Pjanić 2'; Florenzi 14'; Gervinho 28', 90+2'; Nainggolan (yellow card) 34'; Emerson (yellow card) 76'; Manolas (yellow card) 81'	Stadium: Stadio Renzo Barbera; Attendance: 15,910; Referee: Antonio Damato

17 October 2015 8	Roma	3–1	Empoli	Rome
18:00 CEST (UTC+02:00)	Pjanić (yellow card) 37', (goal) 56'; De Rossi 59'; Salah 69'	Report	Dioussé (yellow card) 39'; Büchel 75'	Stadium: Stadio Olimpico; Attendance: 34,124; Referee: Piero Giacomelli

25 October 2015 9	Fiorentina	1–2	Roma	Florence
18:00 CET (UTC+01:00)	Roncaglia (yellow card) 53'; Bernardeschi (yellow card) 70'; Babacar 90+4'	Report	Salah 7', (yellow card) 87' (yellow-red card) 87'; Džeko (yellow card) 18'; Florenzi (yellow card) 26'; Gervinho 34'; De Rossi (yellow card) 35'; Szczęsny (yellow card) 84'	Stadium: Stadio Artemio Franchi; Attendance: 36,297; Referee: Daniele Orsato

28 October 2015 10	Roma	3–1	Udinese	Rome
20:45 CET (UTC+01:00)	Pjanić 4'; Maicon 9'; Gervinho 63'; Vainqueur (yellow card) 90'	Report	Perica (yellow card) 37'; Iturra (yellow card) 54'; Aguirre (yellow card) 74'; Théréau 77'	Stadium: Stadio Olimpico; Attendance: 29,599; Referee: Carmine Russo

31 October 2015 11	Internazionale	1–0	Roma	Milan
20:45 CET (UTC+01:00)	Medel 31'; Guarín (yellow card) 59'; Handanović (yellow card) 70'; Palacio (yellow card) 77'; Ljajić (yellow card) 90+1'	Report	Pjanić (yellow card) 41' (yellow-red card) 73'; Digne (yellow card) 90+4'	Stadium: San Siro; Attendance: 59,213; Referee: Nicola Rizzoli

8 November 2015 12	Roma	2–0	Lazio	Rome
15:00 CET (UTC+01:00)	Džeko 10' (pen.); Gervinho 63'; Rüdiger (yellow card) 66'; Vainqueur (yellow card) 68'; Digne (yellow card) 70'	Report	Gentiletti (yellow card) 9'; Biglia (yellow card) 28'; Radu (yellow card) 65'; Felipe Anderson (yellow card) 90+5'	Stadium: Stadio Olimpico; Attendance: 35,253; Referee: Paolo Tagliavento

21 November 2015 13	Bologna	2–2	Roma	Bologna
18:00 CET (UTC+01:00)	Masina 14'; Donsah (yellow card) 26'; Gastaldello (yellow card) 33'; Mirante (yellow card) 38'; Maietta (yellow card) 54'; Destro 87' (pen.), (yellow card) 88'	Report	Manolas (yellow card) 12'; Nainggolan (yellow card) 33'; Pjanić 52' (pen.); Iturbe (yellow card) 57'; Džeko 72' (pen.); Torosidis (yellow card) 85'	Stadium: Stadio Renato Dall'Ara; Attendance: 23,304; Referee: Gianluca Rocchi

29 November 2015 14	Roma	0–2	Atalanta	Rome
15:00 CET (UTC+01:00)	Maicon (red card) 81'; Torosidis (yellow card) 90+5'	Report	Stendardo (yellow card) 12' (yellow-red card) 88'; Gómez 40'; Grassi (yellow card) 58' (yellow-red card) 90+3'; Sportiello (yellow card) 68'; Cigarini (yellow card) 69'; Denis 82' (pen.)	Stadium: Stadio Olimpico; Attendance: 29,222; Referee: Gianpaolo Calvarese

5 December 2015 15	Torino	1–1	Roma	Turin
15:00 CET (UTC+01:00)	Peres (yellow card) 28'; Acquah (yellow card) 36'; Glik (yellow card) 74'; López 90+4' (pen.)	Report	Pjanić (yellow card) 16', (goal) 83'; Florenzi (yellow card) 36'; Nainggolan (yellow card) 56'; Manolas (yellow card) 90+4'	Stadium: Stadio Olimpico di Torino; Attendance: 19,781; Referee: Antonio Damato

13 December 2015 16	Napoli	0–0	Roma	Naples
18:00 CET (UTC+01:00)	Albiol (yellow card) 59'; Mertens (yellow card) 71'	Report	Gyömbér (yellow card) 90'; Nainggolan (yellow card) 90+1'; De Rossi (yellow card) 90+3'	Stadium: Stadio San Paolo; Attendance: 55,726; Referee: Nicola Rizzoli

20 December 2015 17	Roma	2–0	Genoa	Rome
15:00 CET (UTC+01:00)	Nainggolan (yellow card) 22'; Florenzi (yellow card) 29', (goal) 42'; Pjanić (yellow card) 35'; Džeko (red card) 75'; Sadiq 89'	Report	Laxalt (yellow card) 9'	Stadium: Stadio Olimpico; Attendance: 28,133; Referee: Andrea Gervasoni

6 January 2016 18	Chievo	3–3	Roma	Verona
15:00 CET (UTC+01:00)	Castro (yellow card) 28'; Paloschi 44'; Hetemaj (yellow card) 53'; Cacciatore (yellow card) 56'; Dainelli 58'; Pepe 85'	Report	Sadiq 7'; Digne (yellow card) 22'; Florenzi 37'; Falque 71'; Di Livio (yellow card) 88'	Stadium: Stadio Marc'Antonio Bentegodi; Attendance: 12,000; Referee: Massimiliano Irrati

9 January 2016 19	Roma	1–1	Milan	Rome
20:45 CET (UTC+01:00)	Rüdiger 4'; Manolas (yellow card) 29'; Pjanić (yellow card) 34'; Nainggolan (yellow card) 88'	Report	Kucka (yellow card) 28', (goal) 50'; Luiz Adriano (yellow card) 42'; Bertolacci (yellow card) 87'	Stadium: Stadio Olimpico; Attendance: 34,777; Referee: Daniele Orsato

17 January 2016 20	Roma	1–1	Hellas Verona	Rome
15:00 CET (UTC+01:00)	Nainggolan 41'	Report	Pazzini 61' (pen.); Sala (yellow card) 67'; Greco (yellow card) 74'	Stadium: Stadio Olimpico; Attendance: 29,709; Referee: Davide Massa

24 January 2016 21	Juventus	1–0	Roma	Turin
20:45 CET (UTC+01:00)	Mandžukić (yellow card) 51'; Dybala 77'; Evra (yellow card) 88'	Report	De Rossi (yellow card) 9'; Rüdiger (yellow card) 14'; Pjanić (yellow card) 51'; Nainggolan (yellow card) 90+3'	Stadium: Juventus Stadium; Attendance: 39,721; Referee: Luca Banti

30 January 2016 22	Roma	3–1	Frosinone	Rome
20:45 CET (UTC+01:00)	Nainggolan 18'; Manolas (yellow card) 41'; El Shaarawy 48'; Pjanić 84'	Report	Ajeti (yellow card) 15'; Ciofani 24'; Dionisi (yellow card) 64'	Stadium: Stadio Olimpico; Attendance: 29,799; Referee: Marco Guida

2 February 2016 23	Sassuolo	0–2	Roma	Reggio Emilia
20:45 CET (UTC+01:00)	Duncan (yellow card) 76'	Report	Salah 11'; Keita (yellow card) 30'; Nainggolan (yellow card) 73' (yellow-red card) 87'; Vainqueur (yellow card) 90+1'; El Shaarawy 90+4'	Stadium: Mapei Stadium – Città del Tricolore; Attendance: 11,102; Referee: Gianpaolo Calvarese

7 February 2016 24	Roma	2–1	Sampdoria	Rome
20:45 CET (UTC+01:00)	Zukanović (yellow card) 34'; Florenzi 45'; Perotti 50'; Keita (yellow card) 62'	Report	Barreto (yellow card) 11'; Correa (yellow card) 38'; Ranocchia (yellow card) 55'; Pjanić 57' (o.g.)	Stadium: Stadio Olimpico; Attendance: 28,301; Referee: Domenico Celi

12 February 2016 25	Carpi	1–3	Roma	Modena
20:45 CET (UTC+01:00)	Suagher (yellow card) 37'; Mancosu (yellow card) 40'; Gagliolo (yellow card) 47'; Mbakogu (yellow card) 54'; Lasagna 61', (yellow card) 76'	Report	Digne 56'; Džeko 84'; Salah 85'	Stadium: Stadio Alberto Braglia; Attendance: 9,166; Referee: Paolo Tagliavento

21 February 2016 26	Roma	5–0	Palermo	Rome
20:45 CET (UTC+01:00)	Džeko 30', 89'; Keita 52'; Salah 60', 62'	Report	Struna (yellow card) 75'	Stadium: Stadio Olimpico; Attendance: 27,000; Referee: Piero Giacomelli

27 February 2016 27	Empoli	1–3	Roma	Empoli
18:00 CET (UTC+01:00)	Pucciarelli (yellow card) 17'; Zukanović 22' (o.g.); Mário Rui (yellow card) 63' (yellow-red card) 90+4'	Report	El Shaarawy 5', 74'; Pjanić (yellow card) 17', (goal) 27'; Perotti (yellow card) 41'	Stadium: Stadio Carlo Castellani; Attendance: 12,761; Referee: Andrea Gervasoni

4 March 2016 28	Roma	4–1	Fiorentina	Rome
20:45 CET (UTC+01:00)	El Shaarawy 22'; Salah 25', 58', (yellow card) 43'; Perotti 38'; Pjanić (yellow card) 44'; Nainggolan (yellow card) 90+1'	Report	Badelj (yellow card) 40'; Iličić 45+3' (pen.); Bernardeschi (yellow card) 80'; Costa (yellow card) 90'	Stadium: Stadio Olimpico; Attendance: 36,263; Referee: Massimiliano Irrati

13 March 2016 29	Udinese	1–2	Roma	Udine
15:00 CET (UTC+01:00)	Fernandes 85'; Zapata (yellow card) 87'; Danilo (yellow card) 90+1'	Report	Nainggolan (yellow card) 6'; Džeko 15', (yellow card) 31'; Keita (yellow card) 17'; Florenzi 74'	Stadium: Stadio Friuli; Attendance: 17,626; Referee: Paolo Mazzoleni

19 March 2016 30	Roma	1–1	Internazionale	Rome
20:45 CET (UTC+01:00)	Keita (yellow card) 22'; Nainggolan 84'; Manolas (yellow card) 88'	Report	Perišić 53'; Medel (yellow card) 62'; Handanović (yellow card) 75'	Stadium: Stadio Olimpico; Attendance: 47,049; Referee: Daniele Orsato

3 April 2016 31	Lazio	1–4	Roma	Rome
15:00 CEST (UTC+02:00)	Patric (yellow card) 24'; Candreva (yellow card) 27'; Biglia (yellow card) 37'; Hoedt (yellow card) 65' (yellow-red card) 90+5'; Cataldi (yellow card) 69'; Parolo 75'	Report	El Shaarawy 15'; Nainggolan (yellow card) 41'; Rüdiger (yellow card) 56'; Džeko 64'; Florenzi 83'; Perotti 87'	Stadium: Stadio Olimpico; Attendance: 29,922; Referee: Luca Banti

11 April 2016 32	Roma	1–1	Bologna	Rome
20:45 CEST (UTC+02:00)	Salah 50'; Totti (yellow card) 90+3'	Report	Rossettini 25'; Mbaye (yellow card) 35'; Oikonomou (yellow card) 78'	Stadium: Stadio Olimpico; Attendance: 32,835; Referee: Davide Massa

17 April 2016 33	Atalanta	3–3	Roma	Bergamo
12:30 CEST (UTC+02:00)	D'Alessandro 33'; Borriello 37', 50', (yellow card) 51'; Masiello (yellow card) 55'; Raimondi (yellow card) 90'; Kurtić (yellow card) 90+4'	Report	Digne 23'; Nainggolan 27'; Zukanović (yellow card) 35'; De Rossi (yellow card) 67'; Totti 85'; Džeko (yellow card) 90'; Manolas (yellow card) 90+4'	Stadium: Stadio Atleti Azzurri d'Italia; Attendance: 15,326; Referee: Massimiliano Irrati

20 April 2016 34	Roma	3–2	Torino	Rome
20:45 CEST (UTC+02:00)	Florenzi (yellow card) 39'; Manolas 65'; Totti 86', 89' (pen.)	Report	Belotti 35' (pen.), (yellow card) 42'; Martínez 80'; Padelli (yellow card) 84'; Glik (yellow card) 89'	Stadium: Stadio Olimpico; Attendance: 30,407; Referee: Gianpaolo Calvarese

25 April 2016 35	Roma	1–0	Napoli	Rome
15:00 CEST (UTC+02:00)	Pjanić (yellow card) 38'; Rüdiger (yellow card) 47'; Nainggolan 89'	Report	Koulibaly (yellow card) 41'; Ghoulam (yellow card) 41'; Mertens (yellow card) 70'; Jorginho (yellow card) 74'	Stadium: Stadio Olimpico; Attendance: 35,273; Referee: Daniele Orsato

2 May 2016 36	Genoa	2–3	Roma	Genoa
19:00 CEST (UTC+02:00)	Tachtsidis 13'; Pavoletti 65'; Rincón (yellow card) 72'; Laxalt (yellow card) 79'; Marchese (yellow card) 90+1'	Report	Salah 6'; Totti (yellow card) 72', (goal) 77'; De Rossi (yellow card) 83'; El Shaarawy 87'; Strootman (yellow card) 90+1'	Stadium: Stadio Luigi Ferraris; Attendance: 21,355; Referee: Andrea Gervasoni

8 May 2016 37	Roma	3–0	Chievo	Rome
12:30 CEST (UTC+02:00)	Nainggolan 18'; Rüdiger 39'; Perotti (yellow card) 78'; Pjanić 85'	Report	Radovanović (yellow card) 12'; Hetemaj (yellow card) 80'; M'Poku (yellow card) 90+1'	Stadium: Stadio Olimpico; Attendance: 55,508; Referee: Domenico Celi

14 May 2016 38	Milan	1–3	Roma	Milan
15:00 CEST (UTC+02:00)	Locatelli (yellow card) 21'; Mexès (yellow card) 54'; Luiz Adriano (yellow card) 56'; Donnarumma (yellow card) 61'; Bacca 86'	Report	Salah 19'; El Shaarawy 59'; Emerson 82'	Stadium: San Siro; Attendance: 41,571; Referee: Nicola Rizzoli

=== Coppa Italia ===
16 December 2015 Round of 16	Roma	0–0 (a.e.t.) (2–4 p)	Spezia	Rome
14:30 CET (UTC+01:00)	Uçan (yellow card) 19'; Vainqueur (yellow card) 40'; Rüdiger (yellow card) 90+1'	Report	Terzi (yellow card) 34'; Nenê (yellow card) 35'	Stadium: Stadio Olimpico; Attendance: 7,167; Referee: Marco Di Bello
	Penalties
	Pjanić (penalty missed); Džeko (penalty missed); De Rossi (penalty scored); Digne (penalty scored)		(penalty scored) Terzi; (penalty scored) Nenê; (penalty scored) Juande; (penalty scored) Acampora

=== UEFA Champions League ===
==== Group stage ====
Pos	Team	Pld	W	D	L	GF	GA	GD	Pts	Qualification	BAR	ROM	LEV	BATE
1	(Spain) Barcelona	6	4	2	0	15	4	+11	14	Advance to knockout phase	—	6–1	2–1	3–0
2	(Italy) Roma	6	1	3	2	11	16	−5	6	Advance to knockout phase	1–1	—	3–2	0–0
3	(Germany) Bayer Leverkusen	6	1	3	2	13	12	+1	6	Transfer to Europa League	1–1	4–4	—	4–1
4	(Belarus) BATE Borisov	6	1	2	3	5	12	−7	5		0–2	3–2	1–1	—

Source: UEFA
Rules for classification: Group stage tiebreakers

16 September 2015 1	Roma (Italy)	1–1	(Spain) Barcelona	Rome, Italy
20:45 CEST (UTC+02:00)	Florenzi 31'; Nainggolan (yellow card) 63'	Report	Suárez 21'; Piqué (yellow card) 75'	Stadium: Stadio Olimpico; Attendance: 57,836; Referee: Björn Kuipers (Netherlands)

29 September 2015 2	BATE Borisov (Belarus)	3–2	(Italy) Roma	Barysaw, Belarus
20:45 CEST (UTC+02:00)	Stasevich 8'; Mladenović 12', 30'; Milunović (yellow card) 27'; Dubra (yellow card) 90+1'	Report	Digne (yellow card) 12'; De Rossi (yellow card) 46'; Gervinho 66'; Torosidis 82'; Manolas (yellow card) 87'	Stadium: Borisov Arena; Attendance: 12,767; Referee: Mark Clattenburg (England)

20 October 2015 3	Bayer Leverkusen (Germany)	4–4	(Italy) Roma	Leverkusen, Germany
20:45 CEST (UTC+02:00)	Hernández 4' (pen.), 19'; Kramer (yellow card) 36'; Kampl 84'; Mehmedi 86'; Wendell (yellow card) 90'	Report	Nainggolan (yellow card) 24'; De Rossi 29', 38', (yellow card) 35'; Pjanić 54'; Falque 73'	Stadium: BayArena; Attendance: 29,412; Referee: Viktor Kassai (Hungary)

4 November 2015 4	Roma (Italy)	3–2	(Germany) Bayer Leverkusen	Rome, Italy
20:45 CET (UTC+01:00)	Salah 2'; Džeko 29'; Pjanić 80' (pen.); Torosidis (yellow card) 90+1'; Szczęsny (yellow card) 90+4'	Report	Mehmedi 46'; Hernández 51'; Papadopoulos (yellow card) 61'; Toprak (red card) 79'	Stadium: Stadio Olimpico; Attendance: 38,361; Referee: Sergei Karasev (Russia)

24 November 2015 5	Barcelona (Spain)	6–1	(Italy) Roma	Barcelona, Spain
20:45 CET (UTC+01:00)	Suárez 15', 44'; Messi 18', 60', (yellow card) 64'; Piqué (yellow card) 41', (goal) 56'; Alves (yellow card) 57'; Adriano 77'	Report	Vainqueur (yellow card) 62'; Džeko 90+1'	Stadium: Camp Nou; Attendance: 71,433; Referee: Cüneyt Çakır (Turkey)

9 December 2015 6	Roma (Italy)	0–0	(Belarus) BATE Borisov	Rome, Italy
20:45 CET (UTC+01:00)		Report		Stadium: Stadio Olimpico; Attendance: 29,489; Referee: Martin Atkinson (England)

==== Knockout phase ====
===== Round of 16 =====
17 February 2016 First leg	Roma (Italy)	0–2	(Spain) Real Madrid	Rome, Italy
20:45 CET (UTC+01:00)		Report	Ronaldo 57'; Varane (yellow card) 62'; Ramos (yellow card) 85'; Jesé 86'	Stadium: Stadio Olimpico; Attendance: 55,612; Referee: Pavel Královec (Czech Republic)

8 March 2016 Second leg	Real Madrid (Spain)	2–0 (4–0 agg.)	(Italy) Roma	Madrid, Spain
20:45 CET (UTC+01:00)	Danilo (yellow card) 37'; Ronaldo 64'; Rodríguez 68'	Report	Zukanović (yellow card) 76'	Stadium: Santiago Bernabéu; Attendance: 76,654; Referee: Szymon Marciniak (Poland)

== Statistics ==
=== Appearances and goals ===
No.	Pos	Nat	Player	Total		Serie A		Coppa Italia		Champions League	
No.	Pos	Nat	Player	Apps	Goals	Apps	Goals	Apps	Goals	Apps	Goals
Goalkeepers
1	GK	(Romania) ROU	Bogdan Lobonț	0	0	0	0	0	0	0	0
25	GK	(Poland) POL	Wojciech Szczęsny	42	0	34	0	0	0	8	0
26	GK	(Italy) ITA	Morgan De Sanctis	6	0	4	0	1	0	0+1	0
Defenders
2	DF	(Germany) GER	Antonio Rüdiger	37	2	29+1	2	1	0	6	0
3	DF	(France) FRA	Lucas Digne	42	3	32+1	3	0+1	0	8	0
5	DF	(Brazil) BRA	Leandro Castán	6	0	4+1	0	1	0	0	0
13	DF	(Brazil) BRA	Maicon	19	1	12+3	1	1	0	1+2	0
23	DF	(Slovakia) SVK	Norbert Gyömbér	6	0	0+6	0	0	0	0	0
33	DF	(Brazil) BRA	Emerson	9	1	1+7	1	1	0	0	0
35	DF	(Greece) GRE	Vasilis Torosidis	15	1	6+5	0	0	0	1+3	1
44	DF	(Greece) GRE	Kostas Manolas	45	2	36+1	2	0	0	8	0
87	DF	(Bosnia and Herzegovina) BIH	Ervin Zukanović	10	0	6+3	0	0	0	1	0
Midfielders
4	MF	(Belgium) BEL	Radja Nainggolan	42	6	33+2	6	0	0	7	0
6	MF	(Netherlands) NED	Kevin Strootman	5	0	2+3	0	0	0	0	0
15	MF	(Bosnia and Herzegovina) BIH	Miralem Pjanić	41	12	30+3	10	1	0	7	2
16	MF	(Italy) ITA	Daniele De Rossi	31	3	23+1	1	0+1	0	5+1	2
20	MF	(Mali) MLI	Seydou Keita	23	1	16+4	1	0	0	3	0
21	MF	(France) FRA	William Vainqueur	21	0	4+12	0	1	0	2+2	0
24	MF	(Italy) ITA	Alessandro Florenzi	42	8	31+2	7	0+1	0	8	1
48	MF	(Turkey) TUR	Salih Uçan	6	0	0+3	0	1	0	0+2	0
52	MF	(Italy) ITA	Lorenzo Di Livio	1	0	0+1	0	0	0	0	0
Forwards
8	FW	(Argentina) ARG	Diego Perotti	17	3	14+1	3	0	0	2	0
9	FW	(Bosnia and Herzegovina) BIH	Edin Džeko	39	10	21+10	8	1	0	5+2	2
10	FW	(Italy) ITA	Francesco Totti	15	5	2+11	5	0	0	0+2	0
11	FW	(Egypt) EGY	Mohamed Salah	42	15	32+2	14	1	0	6+1	1
14	FW	(Spain) ESP	Iago Falque	27	3	13+9	2	0	0	3+2	1
22	FW	(Italy) ITA	Stephan El Shaarawy	18	8	15+1	8	0	0	2	0
92	FW	(Italy) ITA	Edoardo Soleri	1	0	0	0	0	0	0+1	0
93	FW	(Italy) ITA	Marco Tumminello	1	0	0+1	0	0	0	0	0
97	FW	(Nigeria) NGR	Umar Sadiq	6	2	2+4	2	0	0	0	0
Players transferred out during the season
7	FW	(Paraguay) PAR	Juan Iturbe	19	1	3+9	1	1	0	2+4	0
19	FW	(Colombia) COL	Víctor Ibarbo	2	0	0+2	0	0	0	0	0
22	FW	(Serbia) SRB	Adem Ljajić	1	0	0+1	0	0	0	0	0
27	FW	(Ivory Coast) CIV	Gervinho	17	7	13+1	6	0	0	3	1

Last updated: 14 May 2016
Source: Competitions

=== Goalscorers ===
Rank	No.	Pos	Nat	Name	Serie A	Coppa Italia	UEFA CL	Total
1	11	FW	(Egypt)	Mohamed Salah	14	0	1	15
2	15	MF	(Bosnia and Herzegovina)	Miralem Pjanić	10	0	2	12
3	9	FW	(Bosnia and Herzegovina)	Edin Džeko	8	0	2	10
4	22	FW	(Italy)	Stephan El Shaarawy	8	0	0	8
4	24	MF	(Italy)	Alessandro Florenzi	7	0	1	8
6	27	FW	(Ivory Coast)	Gervinho	6	0	1	7
7	4	MF	(Belgium)	Radja Nainggolan	6	0	0	6
8	10	FW	(Italy)	Francesco Totti	5	0	0	5
9	3	DF	(France)	Lucas Digne	3	0	0	3
9	8	MF	(Argentina)	Diego Perotti	3	0	0	3
9	14	FW	(Spain)	Iago Falque	2	0	1	3
9	16	MF	(Italy)	Daniele De Rossi	1	0	2	3
13	2	DF	(Germany)	Antonio Rüdiger	2	0	0	2
13	44	DF	(Greece)	Kostas Manolas	2	0	0	2
13	97	FW	(Nigeria)	Umar Sadiq	2	0	0	2
16	7	FW	(Paraguay)	Juan Iturbe	1	0	0	1
16	13	DF	(Brazil)	Maicon	1	0	0	1
16	20	MF	(Mali)	Seydou Keita	1	0	0	1
16	33	DF	(Brazil)	Emerson	1	0	0	1
16	35	DF	(Greece)	Vasilis Torosidis	0	0	1	1
Own goal					0	0	0	0
Totals					83	0	11	94

Last updated: 14 May 2016

=== Clean sheets ===
Rank	No.	Pos	Nat	Name	Serie A	Coppa Italia	UEFA CL	Total
1	25	GK	(Poland)	Wojciech Szczęsny	8	0	1	9
2	26	GK	(Italy)	Morgan De Sanctis	0	1	0	1
Totals					8	1	1	10

Last updated: 14 May 2016

=== Disciplinary record ===
No.	Pos	Nat	Name	Serie A			Coppa Italia			UEFA CL			Total		
No.	Pos	Nat	Name	Booked	(yellow card) (yellow-red card)	Sent off (straight red)	Booked	(yellow card) (yellow-red card)	Sent off (straight red)	Booked	(yellow card) (yellow-red card)	Sent off (straight red)	Booked	(yellow card) (yellow-red card)	Sent off (straight red)
1	GK	(Romania)	Bogdan Lobonț	0	0	0	0	0	0	0	0	0	0	0	0
25	GK	(Poland)	Wojciech Szczęsny	1	0	0	0	0	0	1	0	0	2	0	0
26	GK	(Italy)	Morgan De Sanctis	0	0	0	0	0	0	0	0	0	0	0	0
2	DF	(Germany)	Antonio Rüdiger	4	0	0	1	0	0	0	0	0	5	0	0
3	DF	(France)	Lucas Digne	4	0	0	0	0	0	1	0	0	5	0	0
5	DF	(Brazil)	Leandro Castán	1	0	0	0	0	0	0	0	0	1	0	0
13	DF	(Brazil)	Maicon	2	0	1	0	0	0	0	0	0	2	0	1
23	DF	(Slovakia)	Norbert Gyömbér	1	0	0	0	0	0	0	0	0	1	0	0
33	DF	(Brazil)	Emerson	1	0	0	0	0	0	0	0	0	1	0	0
35	DF	(Greece)	Vasilis Torosidis	2	0	0	0	0	0	1	0	0	3	0	0
44	DF	(Greece)	Kostas Manolas	7	0	0	0	0	0	1	0	0	8	0	0
87	DF	(Bosnia and Herzegovina)	Ervin Zukanović	2	0	0	0	0	0	1	0	0	3	0	0
4	MF	(Belgium)	Radja Nainggolan	10	1	0	0	0	0	2	0	0	12	1	0
6	MF	(Netherlands)	Kevin Strootman	1	0	0	0	0	0	0	0	0	1	0	0
15	MF	(Bosnia and Herzegovina)	Miralem Pjanić	10	1	0	0	0	0	0	0	0	10	1	0
16	MF	(Italy)	Daniele De Rossi	9	0	0	0	0	0	2	0	0	11	0	0
20	MF	(Mali)	Seydou Keita	4	0	0	0	0	0	0	0	0	4	0	0
21	MF	(France)	William Vainqueur	3	0	0	1	0	0	1	0	0	5	0	0
24	MF	(Italy)	Alessandro Florenzi	4	0	0	0	0	0	0	0	0	4	0	0
48	MF	(Turkey)	Salih Uçan	0	0	0	1	0	0	0	0	0	1	0	0
52	MF	(Italy)	Lorenzo Di Livio	1	0	0	0	0	0	0	0	0	1	0	0
7	FW	(Paraguay)	Juan Iturbe	1	0	0	0	0	0	0	0	0	1	0	0
8	FW	(Argentina)	Diego Perotti	2	0	0	0	0	0	0	0	0	2	0	0
9	FW	(Bosnia and Herzegovina)	Edin Džeko	4	0	1	0	0	0	0	0	0	4	0	1
10	FW	(Italy)	Francesco Totti	3	0	0	0	0	0	0	0	0	3	0	0
11	FW	(Egypt)	Mohamed Salah	1	1	0	0	0	0	0	0	0	1	1	0
14	FW	(Spain)	Iago Falque	1	0	0	0	0	0	0	0	0	1	0	0
18	FW	(Argentina)	Ezequiel Ponce	0	0	0	0	0	0	0	0	0	0	0	0
19	FW	(Colombia)	Víctor Ibarbo	0	0	0	0	0	0	0	0	0	0	0	0
22	FW	(Italy)	Stephan El Shaarawy	0	0	0	0	0	0	0	0	0	0	0	0
22	FW	(Serbia)	Adem Ljajić	0	0	0	0	0	0	0	0	0	0	0	0
27	FW	(Ivory Coast)	Gervinho	0	0	0	0	0	0	0	0	0	0	0	0
92	FW	(Italy)	Edoardo Soleri	0	0	0	0	0	0	0	0	0	0	0	0
93	FW	(Italy)	Marco Tumminello	0	0	0	0	0	0	0	0	0	0	0	0
97	FW	(Nigeria)	Umar Sadiq	0	0	0	0	0	0	0	0	0	0	0	0
Totals				79	3	2	3	0	0	10	0	0	92	3	2

Last updated: 14 May 2016
