= Víctor Ibarbo =

Colombian footballer (born 1990)

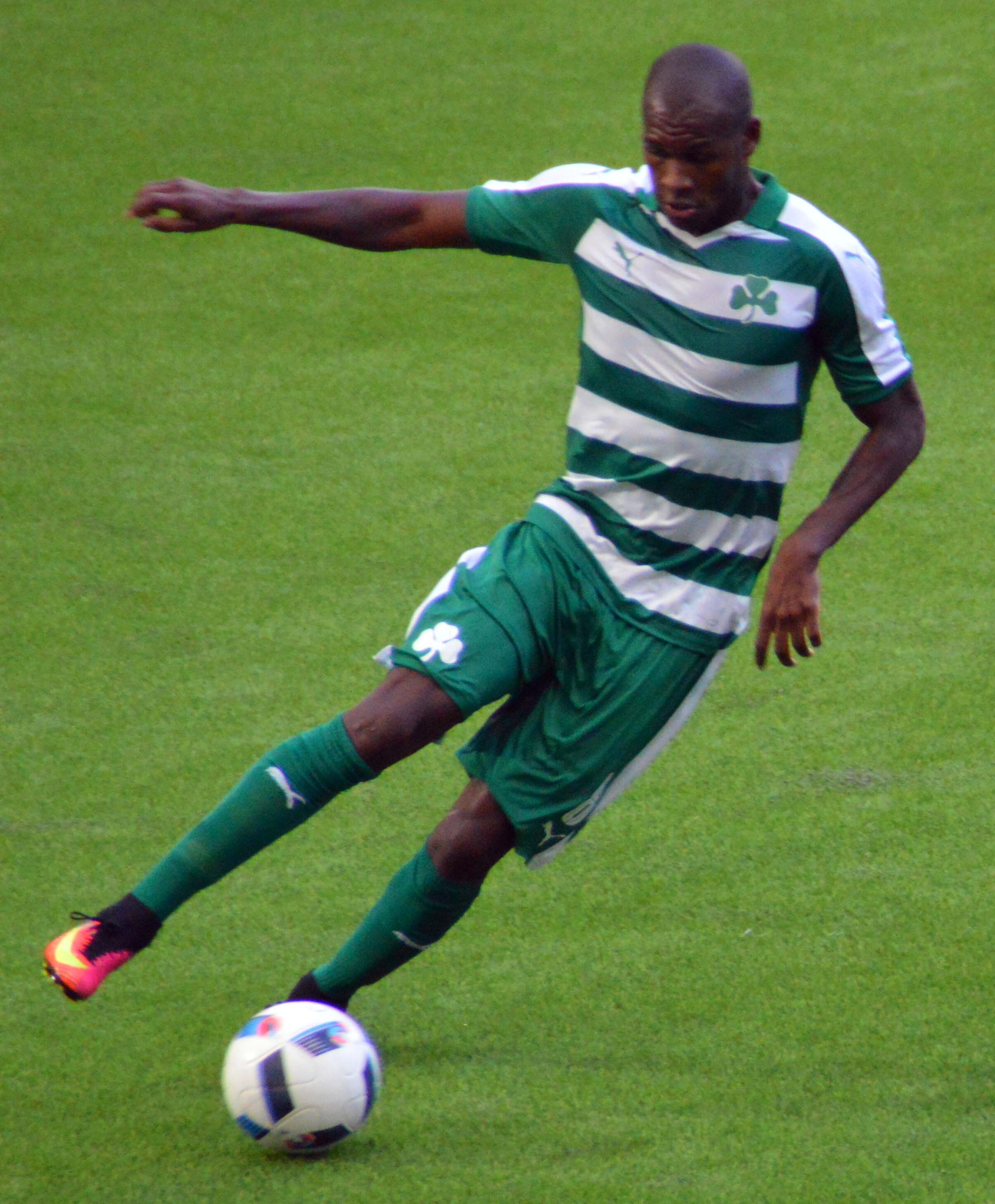
- Ibarbo with Panathinaikos in 2016

Personal information
- Full name: Segundo Víctor Ibarbo Guerrero
- Date of birth: 19 May 1990 (age 36)
- Place of birth: Tumaco, Colombia
- Height: 1.88 m (6 ft 2 in)
- Positions: Winger; forward

Team information
- Current team: San Cataldo

Youth career
- 2001–2008: Club La Cantera

Senior career*
Years	Team	Apps	(Gls)
2008–2011	Atlético Nacional	102	(6)
2011–2017	Cagliari	116	(15)
2015	→ Roma (loan)	12	(0)
2015–2016	→ Watford (loan)	4	(0)
2016	→ Atlético Nacional (loan)	11	(1)
2016–2017	→ Panathinaikos (loan)	8	(0)
2017	→ Sagan Tosu (loan)	25	(5)
2018–2019	Sagan Tosu	10	(2)
2019	→ V-Varen Nagasaki (loan)	16	(2)
2020–2023	V-Varen Nagasaki	51	(5)
2023–2024	América de Cali	21	(3)
2024–2025	Inter Palmira	43	(8)
2026	Pontedera	3	(0)
2026–	San Cataldo	0	(0)

International career
2007–2010	Colombia U20	8	(1)
2010–2016	Colombia	15	(1)
- * Club domestic league appearances and goals as of 1 October 2026

Segundo Víctor Ibarbo Guerrero (Spanish pronunciation: [ˈbiɣtoɾ iˈβaɾβo]; born 19 May 1990) is a Colombian professional footballer who plays as a winger or forward for Eccellenza Basilicata club San Cataldo.

After starting his career at Atlético Nacional, he moved to Cagliari in 2011, where he made over 100 Serie A appearances. He also had unsuccessful loans at Roma, Watford, back at Atlético Nacional and Panathinaikos.

A full international for Colombia since 2010, he was part of their teams that reached the quarter-finals at the 2014 FIFA World Cup and 2015 Copa América.

He is also known in the EA Sports FIFA franchise as one of the most used players in FIFA 14 and FIFA 15 and in the latter had a popular partnership with Seydou Doumbia and Gervinho.

== Club career ==
=== Atlético Nacional ===
Born in Tumaco, Colombia, Ibarbo started his career at Club La Cantera before moving to Atlético Nacional, where he started his professional career and quickly promoted to the first team.

Ibarbo made his Atlético Nacional debut in a 1–0 loss against Envigado on 21 February 2008. Throughout the 2008 season, he quickly established himself in the starting eleven for the side, playing in the midfield position. This resulted in him making 16 appearances for the side later in the season.

Ahead of the 2009 season, Ibarbo was linked with a move to Serie A side Udinese, which saw his teammate Juan Camilo Zúñiga moved a year before. Despite this, he continued to remain in the first team regular for the club. However, on 5 April 2009, Ibarbo was sent–off in the 59th minute, just 13 minutes after coming on as a substitute at half–time, in a 2–0 loss against Once Caldas. After returning from suspension, he then scored his first goal for the club on 14 May 2009, in a 2–1 win over Independiente Medellín. During the summer transfer window, Udinese continued to be interested in signing Ibarbo and the deal was agreed. However, the move never materialised and stayed at the club to allow him to participate in the Categoría Primera A. In the Torneo Finalización semi-finals, Ibarbo played an important role in a 2–1 win over Deportes Tolima when he set up two goals on 22 November 2009. Despite his performance, this was not enough to help Nacional qualify for the finals, but a huge overturn from the Apertura where they finished second to last in the table. Despite suffering from injuries and suspension later in the season, Ibarbo finished the 2009 season making 30 appearances and scoring once in all competitions.

Ibarbo started out the 2010 season mostly on the substitute bench. By April, Ibarbo soon quickly regained his place in the starting lineup in the first team. He then played a role when he made six assists in three matches against Cortuluá (twice), Independiente Medellín, and Real Cartagena. On 2 May 2010, he scored his first goal of the season in a 3–2 win over Deportivo Pereira. Ibarbo scored two more goals later in the season. Despite missing out two matches in the 2010 season, Ibarbo went on to make 40 appearances and scoring 3 times in all competitions.

Ahead of the 2011 season, Ibarbo switched number shirt to 8. At the start of the season, however, Ibarbo missed the first two matches, due to an injury. On 20 February 2011 he returned from injury in a 3–1 win over América de Cali. Ibarbo quickly regained his first team place for the side since recovering. After receiving criticism for his performance in recent matches, he was able to redeem it when he scored his first goal of the season, in a 2–1 loss against Boyacá Chicó. A month later, on 11 May 2011, Ibarbo scored his second goal of the season, in a 2–2 draw against Deportes Quindío. In a match against La Equidad for the 2011 Liga Postobón Apertura, Ibarbo played in both legs, as the results were 3–3 all on aggregate and Atlético Nacional ended up winning its 11th National title after beating in the penalty shootout. By the time of his departure, Ibarbo went on to make 22 appearances and scoring 2 times in all competitions this season.

=== Cagliari ===
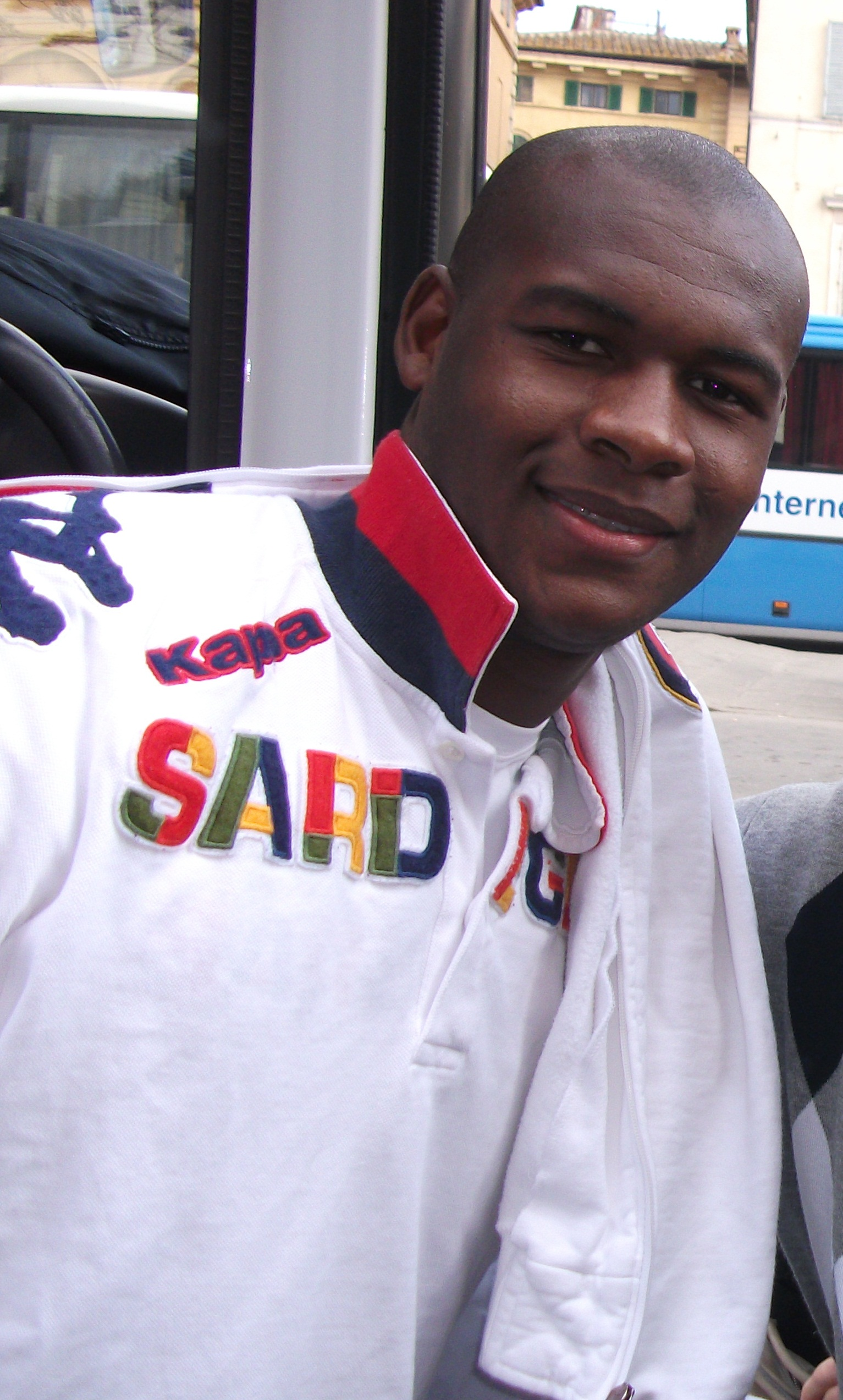
Ibarbo with Cagliari in March 2012.

On 4 July 2011, Ibarbo transferred from Atlético Nacional to Cagliari, having previously been close to a move to Udinese two years prior.

Ibarbo made his Cagliari debut, where he came on as a substitute for Thiago Ribeiro in the 51st minute, in a 2–1 win over Roma in the opening game of the season. Since joining the club, he appeared on the substitute bench in number of matches. By mid–November, he began to make his way to the starting eleven. On 4 December 2011 he scored his first goal for the club in a 1–0 win over Catania. Ibarbo later scored two more goals later in the season. He provided a double assist for the club's third goal in a game, in a 6–3 loss against Napoli on 9 March 2012. Ibarbo played in every Cagliari's matches in his first season, as he went on to make 39 appearances and scoring 3 times in all competitions. At the end of the 2011–12 season, Ibarbo was praised by the club's then owner Massimo Cellino.

In the 2012–13 season, Ibarbo continued to remain in the first team for the side, though he found himself behind a pecking order in the midfield position and was placed on the substitute bench as a result. Despite this, Ibarbo played a role in the fourth round of Coppa Italia against Pescara on 5 December 2012 when he set up twice for Thiago Ribeiro, who scored a hat–trick, in a 4–2 win to progress to the quarter–final. By January, he later regained his first team place and started in number of matches. On 10 February 2013 Ibarbo scored his first goal of the season, in a 1–1 draw against AC Milan. A month later, on 10 March 2013, he scored a hat-trick in a 3–1 win over Sampdoria, having only scored once in 23 previous games that season. Ibarbo later scored two more goals in the season, in a 1–1 draw against regaining league champion, Juventus on 11 May 2013. Despite missing out three matches during the season, Ibarbo went to make 34 appearances and scoring 6 times in all competitions.

Ahead of the 2013–14 season, Ibarbo was linked with a move away from Cagliari, as top clubs around Europe became interested in signing him. However, Ibarbo, himself, said he wanted to stay at the club, while Cellino placed a price tag on him for about 15 million. Despite this, he continued to remain in the first team at the start of the season. On 25 September 2013, Ibarbo scored his first goal of the season in a 1–1 draw against Livorno. He then scored again on 19 October 2013, in a 2–1 win over Catania. As a result, his performances led to starting a contract negotiations. However, in a 2–2 draw against Sassuolo on 1 December 2013, Ibarbo suffered an injury in early of the game. As a result, he was sidelined for a month. After returning to the first team from injury in early–January, his return was soon short–lived when he was sent–off at a last minutes, in a 1–0 loss against Atalanta on 19 January 2014. Shortly after, Ibarbo suffered an injury once again in early–February. After returning from injury, Ibarbo scored his third goal of the season, in a 3–0 win over Udinese on 2 March 2014. He scored his fourth goal of the season on 19 April 2017, in a 2–1 win over Genoa. At the end of the season, Ibarbo went on to make 31 appearances and scoring 4 times in all competitions.

Following his World Cup performance with Colombia, Ibarbo continued to be linked a move away from the club. As a result, the club began negotiation with Ibarbo over a new contract. Eventually, on 26 August 2014, Ibarbo ended the transfer speculation when he signed a three–year contract, keeping him until 2017. After missing the opening game of the season on 14 September 2014, due to an injury, Ibarbo returned to the follow–up match against Atalanta, where he assisted the club's only goal in the game, in a 2–1 loss. Since his return, Ibarbo quickly regained his place in the first team. On 29 October 2014 he scored his first goal of the season in a 1–1 draw against AC Milan. On 3 November 2014, he was given a straight red card in the 72nd minute of a 4–2 defeat at Lazio. After serving a one match ban, Ibarbo scored and set up one of the goals, on his return, in a 3–3 draw against Napoli on 23 November 2014. However, by the end of the year, he later faced suspension for one match after picking up five yellow cards, as well as, injuries. Throughout January, Ibarbo continued to be linked a move away from the club.

==== Loan spell at A.S. Roma ====
On 1 February 2015, he joined fellow Serie A club A.S. Roma on loan until the end of the 2015–16 season. The club paid €2.5 million, with the option to purchase him for €12.5 million. Shortly after the move, it was announced that Ibarbo would be out for another six weeks with another injury.

He made his debut two days later, replacing Francesco Totti for the last 17 minutes of a 0–2 home defeat against Fiorentina in the quarter-finals of the Coppa Italia. A month later, on 22 March 2015, he made his Roma league debut, coming on as a late substitute for the last 3 minutes of a 1–0 win against Cesena. Following his return from injury, Ibarbo quickly became involved in the first team in number of games towards the end of the season. Ibarbo then played a role against rivals Lazio on 25 May 2015 when he set up a goal for Juan Iturbe, in a 2–1 win to help Roma stay in second position and gave them a direct start in the Champions League in the next year.

On 3 July 2015, Ibarbo's time at Roma was extended further when he signed on loan for another season. Ibarbo appeared the first two matches of the 2015–16 season, both of the matches were late substitute.

==== Loan spell at Watford ====
On transfer deadline day on 1 September 2015, Ibarbo joined Premier League side Watford on a season-long loan from Cagliari. However, his move to Watford initially suffered a setback over a visa issue to allow him to play in England; eventually, it was resolved in the end.

Ibarbo made his Watford debut, where he came on as a substitute in the 82nd minute for Ben Watson, in a 1–0 loss against Crystal Palace on 27 September 2015. However, his first team opportunities with the club become more limited and was demoted to playing for the reserve side. Not a player who satisfied coach Quique Sánchez Flores, he made only four appearances for the Hornets, totalling just 64 minutes, and left in January 2016.

==== Loan spell at Atlético Nacional ====
After a disappointing loan spell at Watford, Ibarbo returned to Colombia for the first time in almost five years, rejoining Atlético Nacional until the end of the season. Ibarbo became eligible to play for the club after he cannot play three different teams in a single season, under the European regulations.

On 7 February 2016 Ibarbo made his Atlético Nacional debut, where he started and played for 70 minutes before being substituted, and set up one of the goals, in a 3–0 win over Jaguares de Córdoba. On 31 March, he was sent off in a 2–1 loss at Millonarios, and was heavily criticized for his performance by website Futbol Red. He scored his first goal of the spell on 4 June, equalising at home to Rionegro Águilas in the quarter-final second leg and then converting in the penalty shootout victory.

However, Ibarbo was sidelined from playing in the league and instead played in the Copa Libertadores, as he went on to make 11 appearances and scored 3 times in all competitions. During the tournament, he scored two for the side. His loan spell ended on 30 June. During the spell, Ibarbo helped the side win the Superliga Colombiana and Copa Libertadores.

Two years after leaving Cagliari and having three different loan spells, Ibarbo returned to the squad in February 2017. However, his return was met with mixed reception from the club's supporters, who branded him a traitor. Ibarbo, himself, acknowledged that he was wrong to leave Cagliari for Roma. Ibarbo's first game after rejoining the club came on 12 February 2017, where he came on as a late substitute, in a 2–0 loss against Juventus. By the time of his departure, Ibarbo made two more appearances upon returning to Cagliari.

==== Loan spell at Panathinaikos ====
On 30 June 2016, he joined Greece's Panathinaikos on loan. As a result, his loan spell at Atlético Nacional ended to allow him to join Panathinaikos.

On 4 August 2016, Ibarbo opened the scoring in a 2–0 away win against AIK for the second leg of the third qualifying round of UEFA Europa League. On 20 October 2016, he scored twice at Standard Liège in a 2–2 draw in the same competition.

After a string of poor performances and a league goal drought, during the managerial reins of both Andrea Stramaccioni and Marinos Ouzounidis, the latter no longer featured Ibarbo in his first-team plans. In conjunction with Ibarbo's prolonged and unjustified absence from training after the 2016 Christmas break, Panathinaikos decided to initiate the necessary procedures for the termination of his loan spell from Cagliari. The player's loan spell at Panathinaikos was officially terminated on 31 January 2017. Before he left Panathinaikos, Ibarbo went on to make 19 appearances and scored 3 times in all competitions.

=== Sagan Tosu ===
On 14 March 2017, Cagliari reached an agreement with Japanese club Sagan Tosu to loan the player out until the end of the season, with a mandatory purchase option effective from the start of the 2017–18 campaign. By the time he joined Sagan Tosu, local newspaper El Mundo described him as "more of a tourist than a footballer".

Ibarbo made his Sagan Tosu debut, where he started the match before coming off in the 56th minute, in a 1–0 loss against Cerezo Osaka in the opening game of the season. On 31 May 2017, he scored his first goal for the club in a 3–2 win over Ventforet Kofu. By the time he was deregistered from the team in late–June, he made 14 appearances and scoring once so far whilst on loan at Sagan Tosu. Ibarbo's permanent transfer to the J-League club was confirmed officially by Cagliari and Sagan Tosu in July 2017. A month later, on 19 August 2017, Ibarbo scored his first brace of his Sagan Tosu career, in a 3–0 win over Omiya Ardija. Ibarbo later scored three more goals later in the season. Despite suffering an injury during the 2017 season, Ibarbo went on to make 29 appearances and scoring 6 times in all competitions. Despite this, Ibarbo was one of the key players in the league.

Ahead of the 2018 season, Ibarbo signed a contract with the club for another season. After missing the start of the season, due to his injury, he returned on 7 March 2018, in a 1–0 loss against Shonan Bellmare in the J. League Cup. Ibarbo then scored his first league appearance of the season, in a 2–1 win over Yokohama F. Marinos on 10 March 2018. Following the match, Ibarbo say he dedicated his goal to his former teammate, Davide Astori, who died 6 days earlier. He then scored his second goal of the season to make a comeback, in a 3–2 win over Nagoya Grampus on 31 March 2018. For his performance throughout the month, Ibarbo was awarded March's MVP. After being sidelined for a month, he returned from injury, coming on as a substitute in 15 minutes from the game, in a 3–1 win over Shimizu S-Pulse on 6 May 2018. However, he was injured again on 29 June, He was deregistered on 23 July.

== International career ==
=== Colombia U20 ===
Ibarbo was first called up by Colombia U20 in 2007. He was then called up to the squad for the South American U-20 Championship. He went on to make six appearances during the tournament.

=== Senior career ===
On 20 May 2010, Ibarbo was called up to the senior team for the first time, alongside teammate Giovanni Moreno. He made his international debut on 27 May 2010 in a 2–1 defeat to World Cup hosts South Africa in Johannesburg. He gained four more caps in friendlies that year.

On 14 November 2013, three days shy of three years since his last call-up, he scored his first international goal in a 2–0 friendly win over Belgium, after replacing Luis Muriel.

Ibarbo was a member of the Colombia squad which reached the quarter-finals of the 2014 FIFA World Cup. He started their first match in Group C, a 3–0 win over Greece. In the second match, a 2–1 win against the Ivory Coast, Ibarbo was substituted after 53 minutes for Juan Quintero due to injury. Quintero remained in the left-wing position until Ibarbo recovered for the quarter-final defeat to Brazil, in which he was replaced at half time by Adrián Ramos.

The following year, Ibarbo made two substitute appearances in Group C at the 2015 Copa América in Chile, in which Colombia again reached the last eight. Since then, Ibarbo hasn't been called up by the national team.

== Personal life ==
Although born in Tumaco, Colombia, Ibarbo grew up in Cali. Ibarbo grew up with his father, an electrician, and Ibarbo's seven brothers.

Ibarbo is married to his wife, Sirley and has a son, Martin. Shortly after returning to Atlético Nacional in 2016, Ibarbo was a victim of robbery after his jewelry, which is worth 70 million peso, was taken from him in Medellín.

Ibarbo is currently represented by his agent, Riccardo Calleri. Ibarbo later considered Zdeněk Zeman as a father to him during his time at Cagliari. In addition to speaking Spanish, Ibarbo also speaks English and Italian.

== Career statistics ==
=== Club ===
As of match played 23 November 2025

Appearances and goals by club, season and competition
Club	Season	League			National cup (Note: Includes Copa Colombia, Coppa Italia, Greek Football Cup, Emperor's Cup)		League cup (Note: Includes J.League Cup)		International		Total	
Club	Season	Division	Apps	Goals	Apps	Goals	Apps	Goals	Apps	Goals	Apps	Goals
Atlético Nacional	2008	Categoría Primera A	16	0	0	0	—		—		16	0
Atlético Nacional	2009	Categoría Primera A	30	1	0	0	—		—		30	1
Atlético Nacional	2010	Categoría Primera A	40	3	0	0	—		—		40	3
Atlético Nacional	2011	Categoría Primera A	16	2	5	1	—		—		21	3
Atlético Nacional	Total		102	6	5	1	—		—		107	7
Cagliari	2011–12	Serie A	38	3	1	0	—		—		39	3
Cagliari	2012–13	Serie A	34	6	3	0	—		—		37	6
Cagliari	2013–14	Serie A	30	4	1	0	—		—		31	4
Cagliari	2014–15	Serie A	13	2	1	0	—		—		14	2
Cagliari	2016–17	Serie A	3	0	0	0	—		—		3	0
Cagliari	Total		118	15	6	0	—		—		124	15
Roma (loan)	2014–15	Serie A	10	0	1	0	—		0	0	11	0
Roma (loan)	2015–16	Serie A	2	0	0	0	—		0	0	2	0
Roma (loan)	Total		12	0	1	0	—		—		13	0
Watford (loan)	2015–16	Premier League	4	0	0	0	0	0	—		4	0
Atlético Nacional (loan)	2016	Categoría Primera A	11	1	0	0	—		8 (Note: Appearances in Copa Libertadores)	2	13	2
Panathinaikos (loan)	2016–17	Super League Greece	6	0	1	0	—		9 (Note: Appearances in UEFA Europa League)	3	16	3
Sagan Tosu	2017	J1 League	25	5	1	0	3	1	—		29	6
Sagan Tosu	2018	J1 League	7	2	1	2	1	0	—		9	4
Sagan Tosu	2019	J1 League	3	0	1	1	2	0	—		6	1
Sagan Tosu	Total		35	7	3	3	6	1	—		44	11
V-Varen Nagasaki	2019	J2 League	16	2	0	0	0	0	—		16	2
V-Varen Nagasaki	2020	J2 League	22	3	0	0	0	0	—		22	3
V-Varen Nagasaki	2021	J2 League	6	0	2	1	0	0	—		8	1
V-Varen Nagasaki	2022	J2 League	7	0	2	0	0	0	—		9	0
V-Varen Nagasaki	Total		51	5	4	1	0	0	—		55	6
América de Cali	2023	Categoría Primera A	18	3	1	0	—		—		19	3
América de Cali	2024	Categoría Primera A	3	0	0	0	—		—		3	0
América de Cali	Total		21	3	1	0	—		—		22	3
Inter Palmira	2024	Categoría Primera B	6	2	0	0	—		—		6	2
Inter Palmira	2025	Categoría Primera B	38	6	0	0	—		—		38	6
Inter Palmira	Total		44	8	0	0	—		—		44	8
Career total			404	44	21	5	6	1	17	5	442	55

=== International ===
Appearances and goals by national team and year
National team	Year	Apps	Goals
Colombia
Colombia	2010	4	0
Colombia	2011	0	0
Colombia	2012	0	0
Colombia	2013	2	1
Colombia	2014	6	0
Colombia	2015	3	0
Total		15	1

Scores and results list Colombia's goal tally first, score column indicates score after each Ibarbo goal.

List of international goals scored by Víctor Ibarbo
No.	Date	Venue	Opponent	Score	Result	Competition	Ref.
1	14 November 2013	King Baudouin Stadium, Brussels, Belgium	Belgium	2–0	2–0	Friendly	

== Honours ==
Atlético Nacional

- Torneo Apertura: 2011
- Superliga Colombiana: 2016
- Copa Libertadores: 2016
