= Dimitrios Vosnakidis =

Greek footballer (born in 1994)

Personal information
- Date of birth: 14 February 1994 (age 32)
- Place of birth: Komotini, Greece
- Height: 1.87 m (6 ft 2 in)
- Position: Centre-back

Team information
- Current team: Ilioupoli
- Number: 2

Youth career
- Panthrakikos
- 2012–2014: Bari

Senior career*
Years	Team	Apps	(Gls)
2014–2015	Bari	1	(0)
2014	→ Lucchese (loan)	4	(0)
2015	→ Savoia (loan)	6	(0)
2016	Zakynthos	17	(1)
2016–2017	Iraklis	3	(0)
2017–2018	Sparta	24	(0)
2018–2019	THOI Lakatamia	25	(0)
2019–2023	Olympiacos Volos	0	(0)
2023–	Ilioupolis	8	(0)

International career^{‡}
2011	Greece U17	1	(0)
2012	Greece U18	2	(0)
2013	Greece U19	4	(0)
- * Club domestic league appearances and goals as of 16 June 2023 ‡ National team caps and goals as of 17 March 2014

Dimitrios Vosnakidis (Greek: Δημήτριος Βοσνακίδης, born 14 February 1994) is a Greek professional footballer who plays as a centre-back for Super League 2 club Ilioupoli.

== Career ==
After starting his youth career at Panthrakikos, Vosnakidis moved to Italy, joining Serie B side Bari in October 2012.

He then progressed through the youth side, and played his first match as a professional on 23 August 2013, coming on as a late substitute in a 0–0 draw at Reggina.
