= Giakoumakis =

Giakoumakis (Greek: Γιακουμάκης) is a Greek surname that may refer to:

- Georgios Giakoumakis (born 1959), Greek naval officer
- Giorgos Giakoumakis (born 1994), Greek footballer
- Petros Giakoumakis (born 1992), Greek footballer
