= Conor Borg =

Maltese footballer (born 1997)

Personal information
- Date of birth: May 13, 1997 (age 29)
- Place of birth: Malta
- Height: 1.85 m (6 ft 1 in)
- Position: Midfielder

Team information
- Current team: Gudja United
- Number: 31

Youth career
- –2013: Floriana
- 2014: Chievo
- 2017–2018: Roma

Senior career*
Years	Team	Apps	(Gls)
2014–2017	Floriana	27	(3)
2019–2021	Ħamrun Spartans	18	(0)
2021–2022	Sirens	16	(0)
2022	Marsaxlokk	5	(0)
2023	Qrendi		
2023–	Gudja United	7	(0)
- * Club domestic league appearances and goals

Conor Borg (born 13 May 1997) is a Maltese footballer who plays as a midfielder for Gudja United.

== Early life ==
Borg has been a supporter of English Premier League side Liverpool. He was described as one "of the country’s brightest prospects". He joined the youth academy of Italian side Chievo at the age of sixteen.

== Club career ==
In 2014, Borg signed for Maltese side Floriana. In 2017, he joined the youth academy of Italian Serie A side Roma. He suffered an injury while playing for the club. He trained with their first team. In 2019, he signed for Maltese side Ħamrun Spartans. In 2021, he signed for Maltese side Sirens. In 2022, he signed for Maltese side Marsaxlokk. In 2023, he signed for Maltese side Qrendi. After that, he signed for Maltese side Gudja United.

== International career ==
Borg represented Malta internationally at youth level. He was regarded as one of the Malta national under-17 football team's most important players at the 2014 UEFA European Under-17 Championship. He captained the Malta national under-17 football team.

== Style of play ==
Borg mainly operates as a midfielder. He is known for his strength. He has been described as a "classic footballer who in the heart of the midfield can act in the double role of a play builder with the license to hit the target".

== Personal life ==
Borg's father died in 2018. Borg was born in 1997 in Malta.
