= 2013–14 AEK Athens F.C. season =

AEK Athens
2013–14 season
- Chairman: Konstantinos Kotsatos (until 29 May); Alexis Alexiou
- Manager: Traianos Dellas
- Stadium: Athens Olympic Stadium
- Football League 2: 1st (6th Group)
- Football League 2 Cup: Quarter-finals
- Top goalscorer: League: Alexandre D'Acol (18); All: Alexandre D'Acol (21)
- Highest home attendance: 13,538 (vs Thyella Rafina) (29 September 2013)
- Lowest home attendance: 4,117 (vs PAO Krousonas) (1 December 2013)
- Average home league attendance: 7,183
- Biggest win: AEK Athens 8–0 Mandraikos
- Biggest defeat: Agrotikos Asteras 2–0 AEK Athens
Home colours	Away colours

The 2013–14 season was the 90th season in the existence of AEK Athens F.C. and the first in the third tier of Greek football. They competed in the Football League 2 and the Football League 2 Cup. The season began on 22 September 2013 and finished on 21 May 2014.

== Kits ==
Supplier: Puma
Sponsor(s): Joker
Features: Fujitsu

Home	Away

== Overview ==
After the competitive relegation of AEK to the second division, the decision to bankrupt the S.A. and establish a new "clean" was immediate without encountering any resistance. Since the spring, Dimitris Melissanidis, the then potential owner of OPAP and former presindent of the club, remained as the last hope for the club, since all their financially prominent supporters were disappeared. Melissanidis believed that the future of AEK depends on the construction of its own stadium. On 9 June, Melissanidis won the elections of AEK Athens with his party called "Regeneration of AEK" and became the new owner of the club. The elections happened to the amateur AEK, since the club ceased being an S.A. by getting relegated to Football League 2, the top amateur division in Greek football. The team did not wear last season's kit in the friendlies, since they did not want to remember the kit which was marked by the worst season in the history of the club. It was the first season of the club's history that did not play in the highest domestic tier. Because of that, the club also did not participate in Greek Cup or in AFCA Cup, but in the Football League 2 Cup.

In the competitive part, Traianos Dellas remained in the position of coach and the roster was filled with young footballers. Nikolaos Georgeas and Bruno Cirillo returned to the team, while the stay of Miguel Cordero was remarkable, since he was perhaps the only footballer whose level higher than the third division of Greece. Under these circumstances, AEK's first place was never in doubt, the season went naturally, i.e. excruciatingly slowly and without any interest. Only the 4 matches that AEK did not win caused a relative irritation among the fans of the team. All the remaining matches of the championship were victorious for AEK and worth mentioning were the incidents that took place in the away game against Egaleo, which cost AEK 3 points due to punishment, without affecting the course of the championship. An interesting element, however, was the large turnout of the fans to the Olympic Stadium throughout the year. The attendance of AEK fans in Football League 2 was much higher than almost all Super League teams. Thus, the team successfully completed the first step of their return and now being in the second division, they continued their journey to the top.

In the Football League 2 Cup, AEK started from the second matchday of the sixth group, where they faced Ilisiakos, beating them with 0–3, while in the third matchday they played against Agios Nikolaos, winning with 5–0 and in the final of their group they beat Asteras Vari by 1–0. Thus, they qualified for the quarter-finals facing Agrotikos Asteras in a single match at Kaftanzoglio Stadium. The trip to Thessaloniki was treated as a chore for AEK and as a result it showed on the pitch where AEK were eliminated with a 2–0 defeat.

== Management team ==
Position	Staff
Manager	(Greece) Traianos Dellas
Assistant manager	(Greece) Vasilios Borbokis
Goalkeeping coach	(Greece) Kostas Kampolis
Fitness coach	(Cyprus) Antonis Kezos
Technical director	(Greece) Nikos Liberopoulos
Executive director	(Bosnia and Herzegovina) Dušan Bajević
Academy manager	(Greece) Akis Zikos
U17 manager	(Greece) Charis Kopitsis
Head of Scouting	(Greece) Michalis Kasapis
Head of Medical	(Greece) Lakis Nikolaou

- Source: aekfc.gr

== Players ==
=== Squad information ===
NOTE: The players are the ones that have been announced by the AEK Athens' press release. No edits should be made unless a player arrival or exit is announced. Updated 21 May 2014, 23:59 UTC+3.

Player	Nat.	Position(s)	Date of birth (Age)	Signed	Previous club	Transfer fee	Contract until
Goalkeepers
Fotis Karagiolidis	(Greece)	GK	28 August 1987 (aged 26)	2013	(Greece) Atromitos	Free	2016
Ilias Vouras	(Greece)	GK	20 February 1988 (aged 26)	2013	(Greece) Niki Volos	Free	2017
Panagiotis Dounis	(Greece)	GK	29 March 1997 (aged 17)	2013	(Greece) AEK Athens U20	—	2017
Defenders
Nikolaos Georgeas (Captain)	(Greece)	RB / LB / DM	27 December 1976 (aged 37)	2013	(Greece) Veria	Free	2014
Bruno Cirillo (Vice-captain)	(Italy)	CB / RB	21 March 1977 (aged 37)	2013	(France) Metz	Free	2014
Stavros Stathakis	(Greece)	CB	30 November 1987 (aged 26)	2013	(Greece) Skoda Xanthi	Free	2016
Anastasios Tsoumagas	(Greece)	LB / LM	22 March 1991 (aged 23)	2013	(Portugal) Leixões	Free	2017
Kostas Tsoupros	(Greece)	CB	20 July 1991 (aged 22)	2012	(Greece) Asteras Magoula	Free	2016
Sokratis Tsoukalas	(Greece)	RB / LB	7 July 1992 (aged 21)	2011	(Italy) Palermo	Free	2016
Stavros Petavrakis	(Greece)	LB / LM	9 November 1992 (aged 21)	2013	(Greece) Fostiras	Free	2017
Nikolaos Argyriou	(Greece)	RB	4 April 1994 (aged 20)	2013	(Greece) AEK Athens U20	Free	2016
Midfielders
Vasilios Rovas	(Greece)	DM / CM / CB / RB	6 January 1984 (aged 30)	2013	(Greece) Apollon Smyrnis	Free	2016
Miguel Cordero (Vice-captain 2)	(Spain)	CM / DM	10 September 1987 (aged 26)	2012	(Spain) Xerez	€70,000	2017
Enias Kalogeris	(Greece) (Albania)	RM / RW	9 October 1990 (aged 22)	2012	(Greece) Thiva	Free	2016
Roberto Katsikas	(Greece) (England)	CM	5 August 1991 (aged 22)	2013	(Greece) Paniliakos	Free	2016
Dimitrios Anakoglou (Vice-captain 3)	(Greece)	AM / CM / RM / LM	6 September 1991 (aged 22)	2013	(Greece) Panserraikos	€50,000	2016
Dimitrios Grontis	(Greece)	CM / AM / LM / RM / LW / RW	21 August 1994 (aged 19)	2012	(Greece) AEK Athens U20	—	2016
Adam Tzanetopoulos	(Greece)	DM / CB / CM	10 February 1995 (aged 19)	2013	(Greece) Niki Volos	Free	2016
Fotis Kezos	(Cyprus)	DM / CB	25 July 1995 (aged 18)	2013	(Greece) AEK Athens U20	—	2016
Nikola Zivanović	(Serbia) (Greece)	DM	21 February 1996 (aged 18)	2013	(Greece) AEK Athens U20	—	2016
Forwards
Zdravko Popović	(Croatia)	ST / LW / SS	2 January 1983 (aged 31)	2013	(Azerbaijan) Simurq	Free	2015
Alexandre D'Acol	(Brazil) (Italy)	ST / SS / LW / AM	18 July 1986 (aged 27)	2013	(Greece) Kallithea	Free	2015
Ivan Brečević	(Croatia)	ST	28 July 1987 (aged 26)	2013	(Slovenia) Koper	Free	2016
Vangelis Platellas	(Greece)	RW / RM / LM / LW / SS / AM	1 December 1988 (aged 25)	2013	(Greece) Skoda Xanthi	Free	2016
Renaldo Rama	(Albania)	RW / LW	27 January 1990 (aged 24)	2013	(Albania) Apolonia Fier	Free	2016
Orestis Paliaroutas	(Greece)	LW	6 August 1994 (aged 19)	2013	(Greece) AEK Athens U20	—	2016
Edin Murga	(Bosnia and Herzegovina)	LW / LM / SS / ST / RW	21 December 1994 (aged 19)	2013	(Bosnia and Herzegovina) Sarajevo	Free	2016
Vasilios Tsevas	(Greece)	ST / SS	27 May 1995 (aged 19)	2013	(Greece) AEK Athens U20	—	2017
Lampros Thanailakis	(Greece)	ST	17 December 1995 (aged 18)	2013	(Greece) Panathinaikos U20	Free	2017
Trifon Kazviropoulos	(Greece)	LW / RW / LM / RM / AM	21 September 1996 (aged 17)	2013	(Greece) AEK Athens U20	—	2016
Left during Winter Transfer Window
Christopher Duberet	(Greece) (Democratic Republic of the Congo)	CB	22 March 1992 (aged 22)	2013	(Greece) Glyfada	—	2016
Alexandros Dimgiokas	(Albania) (Greece)	RM	17 August 1994 (aged 19)	2013	(Greece) AEK Athens U20	—	2016
Michalis Pavlis	(Greece)	SS / ST / RW / LW	22 September 1989 (aged 23)	2012	(Greece) Kavala	Free	2014
From U17 Squad
Giannis Vidalis	(Greece)	RB	1 June 1997 (aged 17)	—	(Greece) AEK Athens U17	—	
Ilias Tselios	(Greece)	CM / AM / DM / RM	6 October 1997 (aged 16)	2008	(Greece) AEK Athens U17	—	
Dimitrios Tzathas	(Greece)	LW / ST / SS	10 November 1996 (aged 17)	—	(Greece) AEK Athens U17	—	
Andreas Vlachomitros	(Greece)	SS / ST / RW / LW	3 July 1997 (aged 16)	2011	(Greece) AEK Athens U17	—	

== Transfers ==
=== In ===
==== Summer ====
Pos.	Player	From	Fee	Date	Contract Until	Source
GK	(Greece) Ilias Vouras	(Greece) Niki Volos	Free transfer	1 July 2013	30 June 2017	
GK	(Greece) Fotis Karagiolidis	(Greece) Atromitos	Free transfer	5 July 2013	30 June 2016	
GK	(Greece) Panagiotis Dounis	(Greece) AEK Athens U20	Promotion	21 July 2013	30 June 2017	
DF	(Greece) Spyros Matentzidis	(Greece) Korinthos	Loan return	1 July 2013	30 June 2014	
DF	(Italy) Bruno Cirillo	(France) Metz	Free transfer	26 August 2013	30 June 2014	
DF	(Greece) Stavros Stathakis	(Greece) Skoda Xanthi	Free transfer	1 July 2013	30 June 2016	
DF	(Greece) Christopher Duberet	(Greece) AEK Athens U20	Promotion	1 July 2013	30 June 2016	
DF	(Greece) Nikolaos Georgeas	(Greece) Veria	Free transfer	1 July 2013	30 June 2014	
DF	(Greece) Nikolaos Argyriou	(Greece) AEK Athens U20	Promotion	1 July 2013	30 June 2016	
DF	(Greece) Michalis Tsamourlidis	(Greece) Panionios	Loan return	1 July 2013	30 June 2016	
DF	(Cyprus) Nikos Englezou	(Cyprus) Nea Salamis Famagusta	Loan return	1 July 2013	30 June 2014	
DF	(Greece) Stavros Petavrakis	(Greece) Fostiras	Free transfer	31 July 2013	30 June 2017	
DF	(Albania) Kledis Hereki	(Greece) AEK Athens U20	Promotion	1 July 2013	30 June 2014	
MF	(Greece) Adam Tzanetopoulos	(Greece) Niki Volos	Free transfer	1 August 2013	30 June 2016	
MF	(Greece) Vasilios Rovas	(Greece) Apollon Smyrnis	Free transfer	1 July 2013	30 June 2016	
MF	(Senegal) Ablaye Faye	(Greece) Kallithea	Free transfer	29 August 2013	30 June 2017	
MF	(Greece) Iraklis Garoufalias	(Greece) Asteras Magoula	Loan return	1 July 2013	30 June 2014	
MF	(Cyprus) Fotis Kezos	(Greece) AEK Athens U20	Promotion	17 July 2013	30 June 2016	
MF	(Serbia) Nikola Zivanović	(Greece) AEK Athens U20	Promotion	1 July 2013	30 June 2016	
MF	(Greece) Roberto Katsikas	(Greece) Paniliakos	Free transfer	5 August 2013	30 June 2016	
MF	(Albania) Alexandros Dimgiokas	(Greece) AEK Athens U20	Promotion	21 July 2013	30 June 2016	
FW	(Greece) Vangelis Platellas	(Greece) Skoda Xanthi	Free transfer	28 August 2013	30 June 2016	
FW	(Albania) Renaldo Rama	(Albania) Apolonia Fier	Free transfer	9 July 2013	30 June 2016	
FW	(Albania) Flosard Malci	(Greece) AEK Athens U20	Promotion	1 July 2013	30 June 2016	
FW	(Greece) Tryfon Kazviropoulos	(Greece) AEK Athens U20	Promotion	1 July 2013	30 June 2016	
FW	(Greece) Orestis Paliaroutas	(Greece) AEK Athens U20	Promotion	1 July 2013	30 June 2016	
FW	(Brazil) Alexandre D'Acol	(Greece) Kallithea	Free transfer	28 August 2013	30 June 2015	
FW	(Croatia) Zdravko Popović	(Azerbaijan) Simurq	Free transfer	27 August 2013	30 June 2015	
FW	(Greece) Lampros Thanailakis	(Greece) Panathinaikos U20	Free transfer	31 July 2013	30 June 2017	
FW	(Croatia) Ivan Brečević	(Slovenia) Koper	Free transfer	15 July 2013	30 June 2016	
FW	(Bosnia and Herzegovina) Edin Murga	(Bosnia and Herzegovina) Sarajevo	Free transfer	9 July 2013	30 June 2016	
FW	(Greece) Vasilios Tsevas	(Greece) AEK Athens U20	Promotion	1 July 2013	30 June 2017	

=== Out ===
==== Summer ====
No.	Pos.	Player	To	Fee	Date	Source
1	GK	(Greece) Dimitrios Konstantopoulos	(England) Middlesbrough	End of contract	16 August 2013	
3	DF	(Portugal) Yago Fernández	(Sweden) Häcken	Contract termination	19 August 2013	
7	FW	(Greece) Nikolaos Katsikokeris	(Greece) Panthrakikos	Contract termination	14 August 2013	
8	MF	(Greece) Giorgos Katidis	(Italy) Novara	Contract termination	11 July 2013	
9	FW	(Greece) Thomas Tsitas	(Greece) Niki Volos	Contract termination	18 July 2013	
10	MF	(Poland) Roger Guerreiro	(Brazil) Guaratinguetá	End of contract	27 September 2013	
13	MF	(Greece) Antonis Rikka	(France) Red Star	End of contract	4 July 2013	
14	FW	(Greece) Andreas Stamatis	(Greece) Paniliakos	Contract termination	3 September 2013	
18	DF	(Greece) Konstantinos Nikolopoulos	(Greece) Zakynthos	Contract termination	30 June 2013	
20	FW	(Cape Verde) José Furtado	(Romania) Poli Timișoara	Contract termination	8 August 2013	
21	MF	(Greece) Taxiarchis Fountas	(Austria) Red Bull Salzburg	Contract termination	2 September 2013	
23	MF	(Greece) Xenofon Fetsis	(Greece) Doxa Vyronas	End of contract	13 September 2013	
24	DF	(Greece) Konstantinos Vlachos	(Greece) Olympiacos U20	Contract termination	9 July 2013	
28	GK	(Greece) Theodoros Moschonas	(Greece) Fostiras	End of contract	7 August 2013	
30	MF	(Ghana) Joseph Agyriba	(Spain) Torre Levante	Contract termination	3 September 2013	
33	FW	(Greece) Antonis Petropoulos	(Greece) Apollon Smyrnis	Contract termination	19 June 2013	
37	DF	(Greece) Valentinos Vlachos	(Belgium) Club Brugge	Contract termination	14 June 2013	
39	MF	(Greece) Dimitrios Anastasopoulos	(Germany) Jahn Regensburg	Contract termination	27 June 2013	
47	DF	(Greece) Mavroudis Bougaidis	(Spain) Granada	Contract termination	30 August 2013	
63	MF	(Greece) Christos Papadimitriou	(Germany) Leipzig	Free transfer^{[a]}	11 July 2013	
66	MF	(Greece) Alexandros Nikolias	(Greece) Glyfada	Contract termination	28 August 2013	
70	FW	(Greece) Giannis Karalis	(Greece) Kallithea	Contract termination	31 August 2013	
77	DF	(Greece) Christos Arkoudas	(Greece) Atromitos	Contract termination	30 June 2013	
82	MF	(Greece) Pavlos Mitropoulos	(Greece) Panetolikos	Loan return	30 June 2013	
88	MF	(Greece) Nikos Kourellas	(Greece) Kavala	Contract termination	27 August 2013	
89	GK	(Greece) Ilias Makryonitis	(Greece) Ionikos	Contract termination	23 July 2013	
91	DF	(Greece) Georgios Koutroumpis	(Greece) Panathinaikos	Contract termination	17 July 2013	
99	GK	(Greece) Giannis Arabatzis	(Cyprus) Ermis Aradippou	End of contract	20 August 2013	
—	DF	(Greece) Spyros Matentzidis	(Greece) Kilkisiakos	Contract termination	21 July 2013	
—	DF	(Cyprus) Nikos Englezou	(Cyprus) AEK Larnaca	Contract termination	8 July 2013	
—	DF	(Greece) Michalis Tsamourlidis	(Greece) AO Nea Ionia	Contract termination	17 September 2013	
—	MF	(Greece) Iraklis Garoufalias	(Greece) Fostiras	Contract termination	30 June 2013	
—	MF	(Cyprus) Georgios Aresti	(Cyprus) Enosis Neon Paralimni	Contract termination	28 August 2013	

a. Leipzig paid €50,000 to AEK Athens for the player's expenses.

==== Winter ====
No.	Pos.	Player	To	Fee	Date	Source
—	FW	(Greece) Michalis Pavlis	Retired		2 January 2014	

=== Loan out ===
==== Summer ====
No.	Pos.	Player	To	Fee	Date	Until	Option to buy	Source
—	DF	(Albania) Kledis Hereki	(Greece) AO Nea Ionia	Free	25 July 2013	30 June 2014	✗	
—	MF	(Senegal) Ablaye Faye	(Greece) Kallithea	Free	29 August 2013	30 June 2014	✗	
—	FW	(Albania) Flosard Malci	(Greece) AO Nea Ionia	Free	25 July 2013	30 June 2014	✗	

==== Winter ====
No.	Pos.	Player	To	Fee	Date	Until	Option to buy	Source
—	DF	(Greece) Christopher Duberet	(Greece) Peramaikos	Free	31 January 2014	30 June 2014	✗	
—	MF	(Albania) Alexandros Dimgiokas	(Greece) Peramaikos	Free	31 January 2014	30 June 2014	✗	

=== Contract renewals ===
Pos.	Player	Date	Former Exp. Date	New Exp. Date	Source
DF	(Greece) Kostas Tsoupros	7 June 2013	30 June 2016	30 June 2016	
DF	(Greece) Sokratis Tsoukalas	29 May 2013	30 June 2014	30 June 2016	
DF	(Greece) Anastasios Tsoumagas	26 May 2013	30 June 2015	30 June 2017	
MF	(Spain) Miguel Cordero	19 June 2013	30 June 2014	30 June 2017	
MF	(Greece) Dimitrios Grontis	7 June 2013	30 June 2016	30 June 2016	
MF	(Greece) Enias Kalogeris	3 June 2013	30 June 2016	30 June 2016	
MF	(Greece) Dimitrios Anakoglou	26 May 2013	30 June 2016	30 June 2017	
FW	(Greece) Michalis Pavlis	3 June 2013	30 June 2013	30 June 2014	

=== Overall transfer activity ===
==== Expenditure ====
Summer: ▼€0

Winter: ▼€0

Total: ▼€0

==== Income ====
Summer: ▲€0

Winter: ▲€0

Total: ▲€0

==== Net Totals ====
Summer: €0

Winter: €0

Total: €0

== Pre-season and friendlies ==
4 August 2013 Friendly	AEK Athens	4–1	Nea Ionia	Spata
19:00 EEST (UTC+3)	Tsoupros 45'; Anakoglou (pen.); Grontis	Report	Ropas 3' (pen.)	Stadium: Spata Training Centre; Attendance: Behind closed doors

14 August 2013 Friendly	AE Dimini	2–4	AEK Athens	Pelion
18:00 EEST (UTC+3)	Filatzikiotis 5'; Barboutas 66' (pen.)	Report	Anakoglou 38'; Katsikas 42'; Rama 57'; Brečević 69'	Stadium: Dimini Stadium; Attendance: 800

18 August 2013 Friendly	Rigas Feraios	1–3	AEK Athens	Velestino
18:00 EEST (UTC+3)	Chatzis 58'	Report	Paliaroutas 45'; Brečević 67', 71'	Stadium: Velestino Stadium; Attendance: 3,000

21 August 2013 Friendly	Apollon Kalamarias	1–1	AEK Athens	Velestino
18:00 EEST (UTC+3)	Vlachos 16'	Report	Brečević 57'	Stadium: Velestino Stadium

25 August 2013 Friendly	Niki Volos	3–1	AEK Athens	Volos
19:00 EEST (UTC+3)	Soiledis 35'; Ješić 70' (pen.); Jové 90+1'	Report	Kasviropoulos 86'	Stadium: Panthessaliko Stadium; Referee: Manolis Skoulas (Thessaly)

31 August 2013 Friendly	Kallithea	1–2	AEK Athens	Kallithea
20:00 EEST (UTC+3)	Galán 63'	Report	Platellas 15'; D' Acol 16'	Stadium: Grigoris Lambrakis Stadium; Referee: Dimitris Antoniou (Athens)
Note: A moment of silence was held in memory of the president of Kallithea, Nikos Salevris.

4 September 2013 Chrisostomeia 2013 Tournament	Triglia Rafinas	0–1	AEK Athens	Rafina
18:00 EEST (UTC+3)		Report	Toskas 4' (o.g.)	Stadium: Rafina Stadium
Note: 45 minute match.

4 September 2013 Chrisostomeia 2013 Tournament	AEK Athens	2–0	Apollon Smyrnis	Rafina
20:00 EEST (UTC+3)	Murga 42', 43'	Report		Stadium: Rafina Stadium
Note: 45 minute match.

7 September 2013 Friendly	AEK Athens	1–1	Omonia	Marousi
20:00 EEST (UTC+3)	D'Acol 75' (pen.)	Report	Leandro 81'	Stadium: Olympic Stadium; Attendance: 5,000; Referee: Iosif Sfakianakis (Athens)

9 September 2013 Friendly	AEK Athens	0–1	Chaidari	Spata
19:30 EEST (UTC+3)		Report	35'	Stadium: Spata Training Centre; Attendance: Behind closed doors

14 September 2013 Friendly	Ionikos	2–1	AEK Athens	Nikaia
19:00 EEST (UTC+3)	Dimitriou 36'; Pernidakis 48'	Report	Brečević 43'	Stadium: Neapolis Public Stadium; Referee: Alekos Tsamouris (Piraeus)

23 September 2013 Friendly	AEK Athens	5–0	Dionysos	Spata
16:00 EEST (UTC+3)	Rama; Dimgiokas; Murga	Report		Stadium: Spata Training Centre

30 September 2013 Friendly	AEK Athens	0–0	Aris Petroupolis	Spata
16:00 EEST (UTC+3)		Report		Stadium: Spata Training Centre

14 October 2013 Friendly	AEK Athens	2–0	Kallithea B	Spata
16:00 EEST (UTC+3)	Rama; Tsoukalas	Report		Stadium: Spata Training Centre

21 October 2013 Friendly	AEK Athens	1–0	Fostiras	Spata
16:00 EEST (UTC+3)	Thanailakis	Report	Penalty missed	Stadium: Spata Training Centre; Attendance: Behind closed doors

5 November 2013 Friendly	AEK Athens	1–1	Acharnaikos	Spata
15:00 EET (UTC+2)	Tsevas	Report	Goal	Stadium: Spata Training Centre

23 February 2014 Friendly	AEK Athens	1–1	Nea Ionia	Spata
21:00 EET (UTC+2)	Popović	Report	Ogboe	Stadium: Spata Training Centre

26 May 2014 Charity match	Doxa Agias Annas	0–4	AEK Athens	Acharnes
18:30 EEST (UTC+3)		Report	Vidalis; Antoniou; Kyriazis; Vlachomitros	Stadium: Agia Anna Stadium
Note: 45 minute match.

== Competitions ==
=== Overall record ===
Competition	First match	Last match	Starting round	Final position	Record							
Competition	First match	Last match	Starting round	Final position	Pld	W	D	L	GF	GA	GD	Win %
Football League 2	22 September 2013	21 May 2014	Matchday 1	Winners	28	24	3	1	80	14	+66	85.71
Football League 2 Cup	13 October 2013	29 December 2013	First round	Quarter-finals	4	3	0	1	9	2	+7	75.00
Total					32	27	3	2	89	16	+73	84.38

Last updated: 21 May 2014
Source: Competitions

=== Football League 2 ===
==== Group 6 League Table ====
Pos	Team	Pld	W	D	L	GF	GA	GD	Pts	Promotion or relegation
1	AEK Athens (C, P)	28	24	3	1	80	14	+66	72 (Note: On 24 January 2014, AEK were deducted three points by Hellenic Football Federation.)	Promotion to Football League
2	A.E. Kifisia	28	16	6	6	59	31	+28	54	
3	Irodotos	28	13	6	9	40	33	+7	45	
4	Triglia Rafina	28	11	11	6	42	26	+16	44	
5	Asteras Vari	28	12	6	10	39	29	+10	42	

Source: (in Greek)
Rules for classification: 1st points; 2nd head-to-head points; 3rd head-to-head goal difference
(C) Champions; (P) Promoted

==== Results summary ====
Overall								Home						Away					
Pld	W	D	L	GF	GA	GD	Pts	W	D	L	GF	GA	GD	W	D	L	GF	GA	GD
28	24	3	1	80	14	+66	72	13	1	0	51	7	+44	11	2	1	29	7	+22

Last updated: 2013-05-21.
Source: epo.gr

==== Results by Matchday ====
Round	1	2	3	4	5	6	7	8	9	10	11	12	13	14	15	16	17	18	19	20	21	22	23	24	25	26	27	28	29	30
Ground	A	H	A	H	A	H	–	A	H	A	H	A	H	H	A	H	A	H	A	H	A	–	H	A	H	A	H	A	A	H
Result	W	W	D	W	W	W	–	W	W	D	W	W	W	W	W	W	L	W	W	W	W	–	D	W	W	W	W	W	W	W
Position	7	7	4	1	1	1	1	1	1	2	1	1	1	1	1	1	1	1	1	1	1	1	1	1	1	1	1	1	1	1

Updated to match(es) played on 21 May 2014. Source: epo.gr
A = Away; H = Home; W = Win; D = Draw; L = Loss; P = Postponed

==== Matches ====
22 September 2013 1	Mandraikos	0–2	AEK Athens	Fyli
16:30 EEST (UTC+3)	Siakavaras (yellow card) 34'; Meshini (yellow card) 56'; Vasiliou (yellow card) 74'	Report	Stathakis 11'; D'Acol (penalty missed) 75'; Platellas 82', (yellow card) 83'	Stadium: Fyli Stadium; Attendance: 2,850; Referee: Giorgos Tzovaras (Phthiotis)

29 September 2013 2	AEK Athens	2–1	Thyella Rafinas	Marousi
16:30 EEST (UTC+3)	Anakoglou (penalty missed) 4'; D'Acol 30'; Cordero (yellow card) 34'; Platellas 60'	Report	Tselios (yellow card) 4'; Rabavilas 74'; Prodromou (yellow card) 90+1'	Stadium: Olympic Stadium; Attendance: 13,538; Referee: Athanasios Tzilos (Larissa)

6 October 2013 3	A.O. Peristeri	0–0	AEK Athens	Kallithea
16:00 EEST (UTC+3)	Chelmis (yellow card) 34'	Report	Grontis (yellow card) 39'; Cordero (yellow card) 90+3'	Stadium: Grigoris Lambrakis Stadium; Attendance: 4,000; Referee: Aristeidis Vatsios (West Attica)

20 October 2013 4	AEK Athens	3–0	Agios Nikolaos	Marousi
16:00 EEST (UTC+3)	Popović 29', 60'; D'Acol 63'; Grontis (yellow card) 70'	Report	Kokolakis (yellow card) 37'	Stadium: Olympic Stadium; Attendance: 9,916; Referee: Dimitris Kritikos (Thessaly)

11 December 2013 5	Irodotos	1–2	AEK Athens	Heraklion
17:00 EET (UTC+2)	Cournti (yellow card) 13'; Georgopoulos (yellow card) 20'; Kozyrakis (yellow card) 27'; Chatziandreou (yellow card) 33'; Zafiris (yellow card) 35'; Moraitis 53'; Binichakis (yellow card) 68'	Report	D'Acol 59', (penalty missed) 74'; Rovas (yellow card) 66'; Anakoglou (yellow card) 68'; Platellas (yellow card) 88', (goal) 90+3'; Cordero (yellow card) 90+2'	Stadium: Pankritio Stadium; Attendance: 2,000; Referee: Charalampos Sotiriadis (Lasithi)

3 November 2013 6	AEK Athens	3–0	Triglia Rafinas	Marousi
15:15 EET (UTC+2)	Cordero 10'; D'Acol 54'; Brečević 56'; Georgeas (yellow card) 70'; Stathakis (yellow card) 76'; Rovas (yellow card) 86'	Report	Mantzis (yellow card) 25'	Stadium: Olympic Stadium; Attendance: 12,064; Referee: Dimitris Psichoulas (Euboea)

11 November 2013 7	Day off

23 November 2013 8	Ilisiakos	0–1	AEK Athens	Marousi
15:00 EET (UTC+2)	Siskos (yellow card) 75'; Konstantinou (yellow card) 90+3'	Report	Cordero (yellow card) 66'; Tsevas 81'; Stathakis (yellow card) 88'	Stadium: Olympic Stadium; Attendance: 3,177; Referee: Babis Tsoukalas (Athens)

1 December 2013 9	AEK Athens	7–1	PAO Kroussonas	Marousi
15:00 EET (UTC+2)	Grontis 33'; Rovas (yellow card) 35'; Brečević 46', 55', 59'; Cordero (yellow card) 49'; D'Acol 53', 74'; Platellas 65'; Georgeas (yellow card) 70'	Report	Kourakis (yellow card) 31'; Paparounas (yellow card) 34'; Skoutelis (yellow card) 43'; Kalomiris (red card) 72'; Pappas 79'	Stadium: Olympic Stadium; Attendance: 4,117; Referee: Vangelis Manouchos (Argolida)

8 December 2013 10	Asteras Vari	1–1	AEK Athens	Acharnes
15:00 EET (UTC+2)	Kopelas (yellow card) 34'; Schizas (yellow card) 54'; Papadimitropoulos (yellow card) 80'; Fosteris (yellow card) 83'; Zonas 84', (yellow card) 90+2'	Report	Rovas (yellow card) 43'; D'Acol 55', (yellow card) 69'	Stadium: Acharnes Stadium; Attendance: 2,000; Referee: Dimitris Kritikos (Thessaly)

21 December 2013 11	AEK Athens	4–2	A.E. Kifisia	Marousi
17:30 EET (UTC+2)	Tsoupros 8'; Tsoukalas 39'; Brečević 67', 85'	Report	Alabas 21'; Tergousis 23', (yellow card) 60'; Manari (yellow card) 88'	Stadium: Olympic Stadium; Attendance: 5,611; Referee: Andreas Gamaris (Athens)

5 January 2014 12	Egaleo	1–2	AEK Athens	Egaleo
15:00 EET (UTC+2)	Doukakis (yellow card) 20'; Kouboulis (yellow card) 23'; Tabakis (yellow card) 27'; Georgeas 70' (o.g.); Michail (yellow card) 40'; Tournas (yellow card) 68'	Report	Platellas 52'; D'Acol (yellow card) 61'; Anakoglou (yellow card) 63'; Cordero (yellow card) 66'; Brečević (yellow card) 88', (goal) 89'	Stadium: Stavros Mavrothalassitis Stadium; Attendance: 4,000; Referee: Panagiotis Gavrilis (Athens)
Note: The game started with a 28-minute delay, due to incidents between fans of the two teams. Both clubs were punished with a 3-point deduction, 2 games behind closed doors and a €2,500 fine.

12 January 2014 13	AEK Athens	3–0	Peramaikos	Marousi
15:00 EET (UTC+2)	Argyriou (yellow card) 31'; Motos 35' (o.g.); Anakoglou 48', (yellow card) 83'; D'Acol 68'	Report	Georgiadis (yellow card) 32'	Stadium: Olympic Stadium; Attendance: 6,518; Referee: Ilias Anastasiou (Larissa)

19 January 2014 14	AEK Athens	3–0	Ermis Zonianon	Marousi
14:00 EET (UTC+2)	Rovas (yellow card) 10'; Platellas (penalty missed) 43'; Popović 43'; Anakoglou 54'; Tsevas 69'	Report	Roubakis (yellow card) 25'; Varouchas (yellow card) 45+1'; Brilakis (yellow card) 59'	Stadium: Olympic Stadium; Attendance: 6,384; Referee: Georgios Markantonatos (Elis)

26 January 2014 15	Pannaxiakos	0–5	AEK Athens	Naxos
14:45 EET (UTC+2)	Lima (yellow card) 12' (yellow-red card) 88'; Karousis (yellow card) 41'; Kalogeris (yellow card) 52'	Report	Brečević (yellow card) 38', (goal) 47', 53' (pen.), 76'; Platellas 57', 63'; Grontis (yellow card) 59'	Stadium: Naxos Municipal Stadium; Attendance: 1,200; Referee: Michalis Malamas (East Attica)

1 February 2014 16	AEK Athens	8–0	Mandraikos	Marousi
15:00 EET (UTC+2)	Brečević 15', 29', 39'; Petavrakis (yellow card) 36', (goal) 70'; Anakoglou 46', 55'; Platellas 64'; Choustoulakis 89' (o.g.)	Report	Kousouris (yellow card) 42'	Stadium: Olympic Stadium; Attendance: Behind closed doors Referee: Panagiotis Kekelios (Aetoloacarnania)

22 February 2014 17	Thyella Rafinas	1–0	AEK Athens	Acharnes
14:00 EET (UTC+2)	Matzoros (yellow card) 29'; Dounis (yellow card) 64'; Katsougris (yellow card) 66'; Mitropoulos 89'	Report	Stathakis (yellow card) 51'	Stadium: Acharnes Stadium; Attendance: 3,000; Referee: Nikos Makrypodis (Achaia)

16 February 2014 18	AEK Athens	8–1	A.O. Peristeri	Marousi
15:00 EET (UTC+2)	Brečević 7', 11'; Platellas 26', 54', 75'; D'Acol 38', 73'; Popović 51'; Petavrakis (yellow card) 83'	Report	Plestis (yellow card) 16'; Belis 55'	Stadium: Olympic Stadium; Attendance: Behind closed doors Referee: Kostas Topros (Corfu)

1 March 2014 19	Agios Nikolaos	1–6	AEK Athens	Agios Nikolaos
13:00 EET (UTC+2)	Myrillas (yellow card) 3' (yellow-red card) 33'; Christakis (yellow card) 4'; Karniatis 32', (yellow card) 45+1'; Kostakis (yellow card) 60'	Report	Brečević (penalty missed) 4'; Anakoglou 18', 70'; Platellas (yellow card) 27'; Petavrakis (yellow card) 38'; D'Acol 67', 68', 73', 87'; Stathakis (yellow card) 85'	Stadium: Agios Nikolaos Municipal Stadium; Attendance: 1,000; Referee: Dimitris Govesis (Arcadia)

9 March 2014 20	AEK Athens	2–1	Irodotos	Marousi
15:00 EET (UTC+2)	Anakoglou 8'; Platellas (penalty missed) 32', 89'; Grontis (penalty missed) 84'	Report	Pilios 9', (yellow card) 80'; Georgopoulos (yellow card) 10'; Chatziandreou (yellow card) 26'; Balafas (red card) 30'; Achilleos (yellow card) 48'; Kozyrakis (yellow card) 54'; Moraitis (yellow card) 78'	Stadium: Olympic Stadium; Attendance: 5,520; Referee: Aris Liboudis (Macedonia)

16 March 2014 21	Triglia Rafinas	0–2	AEK Athens	Acharnes
15:00 EET (UTC+2)		Report	Platellas 4'; D'Acol 22'	Stadium: Acharnes Stadium; Attendance: 3,000; Referee: Vangelis Manouchos (Argolida)

24 March 2014 22	Day off

30 March 2014 23	AEK Athens	0–0	Ilisiakos	Marousi
16:00 EEST (UTC+3)	Fragis (yellow card) 45'; Tzortzis (yellow card) 68'; Stratakis (yellow card) 77'; Kampas (yellow card) 82'	Report	Petavrakis (yellow card) 56'; Stathakis (yellow card) 90+1'	Stadium: Olympic Stadium; Attendance: 6,306; Referee: Grigoris Chrisos (Chania)

7 April 2014 24	PAO Kroussonas	1–2	AEK Athens	Heraklion
17:00 EEST (UTC+3)	Skoutelis 33'; Bourselis (yellow card) 44'; Chalkiadakis (yellow card) 50' (yellow-red card) 56'; Kordonouris (yellow card) 59'	Report	Cirillo (yellow card) 50', (penalty missed) 60'; Tsevas 74'; Platellas 83'; Petavrakis (yellow card) 90'	Stadium: Pankritio Stadium; Attendance: 2,000; Referee: Lampros Papargyriou (Pieria)

13 April 2014 25	AEK Athens	4–0	Asteras Vari	Marousi
17:00 EEST (UTC+3)	Stathakis 13'; D'Acol 16'; Platellas 71'; Tsevas 74'; Petavrakis (yellow card) 90+3'	Report	Kazantzis (yellow card) 49'; Michos (yellow card) 50'; Fosteris (yellow card) 63'	Stadium: Olympic Stadium; Attendance: 5,124; Referee: Giorgos Tasis (Epirus)

27 April 2014 26	A.E. Kifisia	0–2	AEK Athens	Rizoupoli
17:00 EEST (UTC+3)	Kolotouros (yellow card) 34'; Stasinos (yellow card) 57'	Report	Tzanetopoulos 17'; D'Acol (penalty missed) 58', 32'; Argyriou (yellow card) 84'	Stadium: Georgios Kamaras Stadium; Attendance: 7,000; Referee: Babis Tsoukalas (Athens)

4 May 2014 27	AEK Athens	1–0	Egaleo	Marousi
17:00 EEST (UTC+3)	Rama 49'; Tsoupros (yellow card) 64' (yellow-red card) 67'	Report	Tabakis (yellow card) 81'	Stadium: Olympic Stadium; Attendance: 6,371; Referee: Kostas Miliadis (Macedonia)

11 May 2014 28	Peramaikos	1–2	AEK Athens	Perama
17:00 EEST (UTC+3)	Chatzigiannakos 21', (yellow card) 45'; Samaras (yellow card) 55'; Errikos (yellow card) 83'	Report	Petavrakis 68'; Anakoglou (yellow card) 74'; Rama 81' (pen.)	Stadium: Perama Municipal Stadium; Attendance: 90; Referee: Panagiotis Kekelios (Aetoloacarnania)

14 May 2014 29	Ermis Zonianon	0–2	AEK Athens	Heraklion
17:00 EEST (UTC+3)	Brilakis (yellow card) 7' (yellow-red card) 29'; Vlachos (yellow card) 44'; Kavvalos (yellow card) 66'; Varouchas (yellow card) 80'; Aristinidis (red card) 89'	Report	Rama 43', 75'; Georgeas (yellow card) 66'	Stadium: Pankritio Stadium; Attendance: 1,000; Referee: Michalis Malamas (East Attica)

21 May 2014 30	AEK Athens	3–1	Pannaxiakos	Marousi
17:00 EEST (UTC+3)	Anakoglou 7', 31'; Vlachomitros 80'	Report	C. Rovas 60'	Stadium: Olympic Stadium; Attendance: 4,721; Referee: Giorgos Zacharioudakis (Heraklion)

=== Football League 2 Cup ===
==== Matches ====
AEK Athens advanced to Matchday 2 on walkover.

13 October 2013 2	Ilisiakos	0–3	AEK Athens	Marousi
16:00 EEST (UTC+3)	Fipe (yellow card) 8'; Siskos (yellow card) 41'; Kampas (yellow card) 56'	Report	Georgeas (yellow card) 43', (goal) 55'; Rovas (yellow card) 54'; Brečević 60'; Popović 76'	Stadium: Olympic Stadium; Attendance: 4,000; Referee: Panagiotis Gavrilis (Athens)

17 November 2013 3	AEK Athens	5–0	Agios Nikolaos	Marousi
14:15 EET (UTC+2)	Cirillo (yellow card) 12'; Petavrakis 18'; D'Acol 43' (pen.), 60', 83'; Platellas 69'	Report	Pigiakis (yellow card) 39'; Moutakis (yellow card) 42'; Christakis (yellow card) 90+1'	Stadium: Olympic Stadium; Attendance: 6,808; Referee: Nikos Makripodis (Achaia)

15 December 2013 Group 6 Final	AEK Athens	1–0	Asteras Vari	Marousi
14:30 EET (UTC+2)	Brečević 69'	Report	Brachos (yellow card) 90'	Stadium: Olympic Stadium; Attendance: 4,551; Referee: Gavriil Tzouanopoulos (Achaia)

29 December 2013 Quarter–finals	Agrotikos Asteras	2–0 (a.e.t.)	AEK Athens	Thessaloniki
14:00 EET (UTC+2)	Theodoridis (yellow card) 36'; Georgiadis (yellow card) 56'; Samouilidis (yellow card) 69'; Krystallis 106'; Lazaridis 108'	Report	Cordero (yellow card) 45'; Georgeas (yellow card) 71'; Koukoulekis (yellow card) 73'	Stadium: Kaftanzoglio Stadium; Attendance: 4,000; Referee: Christos Granas (Xanthi)

== Statistics ==
=== Squad statistics ===
As of 21 May 2014

No.	Pos	Player	Football League 2		Football League 2 Cup		Total	
No.	Pos	Player	Apps	Goals	Apps	Goals	Apps	Goals
Goalkeepers
—	GK	(Greece) Fotis Karagiolidis	11	0	2	0	13	0
—	GK	(Greece) Ilias Vouras	15	0	2	0	17	0
—	GK	(Greece) Panagiotis Dounis	4	0	0	0	4	0
Defenders
—	DF	(Greece) Nikolaos Georgeas	26	0	4	1	30	1
—	DF	(Italy) Bruno Cirillo	11	0	2	0	13	0
—	DF	(Greece) Stavros Stathakis	20	2	2	0	22	2
—	DF	(Greece) Anastasios Tsoumagas	12	0	0	0	12	0
—	DF	(Greece) Kostas Tsoupros	5	1	1	0	6	1
—	DF	(Greece) Sokratis Tsoukalas	13	1	0	0	13	1
—	DF	(Greece) Stavros Petavrakis	23	2	4	1	27	3
—	DF	(Greece) Nikolaos Argyriou	11	0	4	0	15	0
Midfielders
—	MF	(Greece) Vasilios Rovas	24	0	4	0	28	0
—	MF	(Spain) Miguel Cordero	24	1	4	0	28	1
—	MF	(Greece) Enias Kalogeris	0	0	0	0	0	0
—	MF	(Greece) Roberto Katsikas	2	0	0	0	2	0
—	MF	(Greece) Dimitrios Anakoglou	25	9	2	0	27	9
—	MF	(Greece) Dimitrios Grontis	25	1	4	0	29	1
—	MF	(Greece) Adam Tzanetopoulos	7	1	0	0	7	1
—	MF	(Cyprus) Fotis Kezos	2	0	0	0	2	0
—	MF	(Serbia) Nikola Zivanović	0	0	0	0	0	0
Forwards
—	FW	(Croatia) Zdravko Popović	16	4	2	1	18	5
—	FW	(Brazil) Alexandre D'Acol	25	18	4	3	29	21
—	FW	(Croatia) Ivan Brečević	16	14	4	2	20	16
—	FW	(Greece) Vangelis Platellas	26	15	3	1	29	16
—	FW	(Albania) Renaldo Rama	8	4	0	0	8	4
—	FW	(Greece) Orestis Paliaroutas	7	0	1	0	8	0
—	FW	(Bosnia and Herzegovina) Edin Murga	5	0	0	0	5	0
—	FW	(Greece) Vasilios Tsevas	14	4	2	0	16	4
—	FW	(Greece) Lambros Thanailakis	0	0	0	0	0	0
—	FW	(Greece) Trifon Kazviropoulos	1	0	1	0	2	0
Left during Winter Transfer Window
—	DF	(Democratic Republic of the Congo) Christopher Duberet	0	0	0	0	0	0
—	MF	(Albania) Alexandros Dimgiokas	0	0	0	0	0	0
—	FW	(Greece) Michalis Pavlis	2	0	1	0	3	0
From U17
—	DF	(Greece) Giannis Vidalis	1	0	0	0	1	0
—	MF	(Greece) Ilias Tselios	1	0	0	0	1	0
—	FW	(Greece) Dimitrios Tzathas	1	0	0	0	1	0
—	FW	(Greece) Andreas Vlachomitros	1	1	0	0	1	1

=== Goalscorers ===
As of 21 May 2014
The list is sorted by competition order when total goals are equal, then by position and then alphabetically by surname.

Rank	Pos.	Player	Football League 2	Football League 2 Cup	Total
1	FW	(Brazil) Alexandre D'Acol	18	3	21
2	FW	(Croatia) Ivan Brečević	15	2	17
3	FW	(Greece) Vangelis Platellas	15	1	16
4	MF	(Greece) Dimitrios Anakoglou	9	0	9
5	FW	(Croatia) Zdravko Popović	4	1	5
6	FW	(Greece) Vasilios Tsevas	4	0	4
6	FW	(Albania) Renaldo Rama	4	0	4
8	DF	(Greece) Stavros Petavrakis	2	1	3
9	DF	(Greece) Stavros Stathakis	2	0	2
10	DF	(Greece) Sokratis Tsoukalas	1	0	1
10	DF	(Greece) Kostas Tsoupros	1	0	1
10	MF	(Greece) Adam Tzanetopoulos	1	0	1
10	MF	(Spain) Miguel Cordero	1	0	1
10	MF	(Greece) Dimitris Grontis	1	0	1
10	FW	(Greece) Andreas Vlachomitros	1	0	1
10	DF	(Greece) Nikolaos Georgeas	0	1	1
Own goals			2	0	2
Totals			80	9	89

=== Hat-tricks ===
Numbers in superscript represent the goals that the player scored.

Player	Against	Result	Date	Competition	Source
(Brazil) Alexandre D'Acol	(Greece) Agios Nikolaos	5–0 (H)	17 November 2013	Football League 2 Cup	
(Croatia) Ivan Brečević	(Greece) PAO Kroussonas	7–1 (H)	1 December 2013	Football League 2	
(Croatia) Ivan Brečević	(Greece) Pannaxiakos	5–0 (Α)	26 January 2014	Football League 2	
(Croatia) Ivan Brečević	(Greece) Mandraikos	8–0 (Η)	1 February 2014	Football League 2	
(Greece) Vangelis Platellas	(Greece) A.O. Peristeri	8–1 (Η)	16 February 2014	Football League 2	
(Brazil) Alexandre D'Acol^{4}	(Greece) Agios Nikolaos	6–1 (A)	1 March 2014	Football League 2	

=== Assists ===
As of 21 May 2014
The list is sorted by competition order when total assists are equal, then by position and then alphabetically by surname.

Rank	Pos.	Player	Football League 2	Football League 2 Cup	Total
1	FW	(Greece) Vangelis Platellas	7	0	7
1	FW	(Croatia) Ivan Brečević	6	1	7
3	MF	(Greece) Dimitrios Anakoglou	5	1	6
3	DF	(Greece) Nikolaos Georgeas	4	2	6
5	MF	(Greece) Dimitris Grontis	5	0	5
6	FW	(Brazil) Alexandre D'Acol	4	0	4
7	DF	(Greece) Stavros Stathakis	2	1	3
7	MF	(Spain) Miguel Cordero	1	2	3
9	DF	(Greece) Sokratis Tsoukalas	2	0	2
9	DF	(Greece) Stavros Petavrakis	2	0	2
9	DF	(Greece) Anastasios Tsoumagas	2	0	2
9	MF	(Greece) Vasilios Rovas	2	0	2
13	DF	(Greece) Nikolaos Argyriou	0	1	1
Totals			42	8	50

=== Clean sheets ===
As of 21 May 2014
The list is sorted by competition order when total clean sheets are equal and then alphabetically by surname. Clean sheets in games where both goalkeepers participated are awarded to the goalkeeper who started the game. Goalkeepers with no appearances are not included.

Rank	Player	Football League 2	Football League 2 Cup	Total
1	(Greece) Ilias Vouras	7	2	9
2	(Greece) Fotis Karagiolidis	6	1	7
3	(Greece) Panagiotis Dounis	2	0	1
Totals		15	3	18

=== Disciplinary record ===
As of 21 May 2014

N	P	Nat.	Name	Football League 2			Football League 2 Cup			Total			Notes
N	P	Nat.	Name	Yellow card	Second yellow card	Red card	Yellow card	Second yellow card	Red card	Yellow card	Second yellow card	Red card	Notes
Goalkeepers
—	GK	(Greece)	Fotis Karagiolidis										
—	GK	(Greece)	Ilias Vouras										
—	GK	(Greece)	Panagiotis Dounis										
Defenders
—	DF	(Greece)	Nikolaos Georgeas	3			2			5			
—	DF	(Italy)	Bruno Cirillo	1			1			2			
—	DF	(Greece)	Stavros Stathakis	5						5			
—	DF	(Greece)	Anastasios Tsoumagas										
—	DF	(Greece)	Kostas Tsoupros	2	1					2	1		
—	DF	(Greece)	Sokratis Tsoukalas										
—	DF	(Greece)	Stavros Petavrakis	7						7			
—	DF	(Greece)	Nikolaos Argyriou	2						2			
Midfielders
—	MF	(Greece)	Vasilios Rovas	5			1			6			
—	MF	(Spain)	Miguel Cordero	6			1			7			
—	MF	(Greece)	Enias Kalogeris										
—	MF	(Greece)	Roberto Katsikas										
—	MF	(Greece)	Dimitrios Anakoglou	4						4			
—	MF	(Greece)	Dimitrios Grontis	3						3			
—	MF	(Greece)	Adam Tzanetopoulos										
—	MF	(Cyprus)	Fotis Kezos										
—	MF	(Serbia)	Nikola Zivanović										
Forwards
—	FW	(Croatia)	Zdravko Popović										
—	FW	(Brazil)	Alexandre D'Acol	2						2			
—	FW	(Croatia)	Ivan Brečević	2						2			
—	FW	(Greece)	Vangelis Platellas	3						3			
—	FW	(Albania)	Renaldo Rama										
—	FW	(Greece)	Orestis Paliaroutas										
—	FW	(Bosnia and Herzegovina)	Edin Murga										
—	FW	(Greece)	Vasilios Tsevas										
—	FW	(Greece)	Lambros Thanailakis										
—	FW	(Greece)	Trifon Kazviropoulos										
Left during Winter Transfer window
—	DF	(Democratic Republic of the Congo)	Christopher Duberet										
—	MF	(Albania)	Alexandros Dimgiokas										
—	FW	(Greece)	Michalis Pavlis										
From U17
—	DF	(Greece)	Giannis Vidalis										
—	MF	(Greece)	Ilias Tselios										
—	FW	(Greece)	Dimitrios Tzathas										
—	FW	(Greece)	Andreas Vlachomitros										

=== Starting 11 ===
This section presents the most frequently used formation along with the players with the most starts across all competitions.

N.	Formation	Matchday(s)
32	4–2–3–1	1–6, 8–21, 23–30

Nat.	Player	Pos.
(Greece)	Ilias Vouras	GK
(Greece)	Vasilios Rovas	RCB
(Greece)	Stavros Stathakis	LCB
(Greece)	Nikolaos Georgeas (C)	RB
(Greece)	Stavros Petavrakis	LB
(Spain)	Miguel Cordero	DM
(Greece)	Dimitrios Grontis	CM
(Greece)	Vangelis Platellas	RM
(Greece)	Dimitrios Anakoglou	LM
(Brazil)	Alexandre D'Acol	AM
(Croatia)	Ivan Brečević	CF

Last updated: 2014-05-21
