= Christopher Duberet =

Congolese-Greek footballer

Christoforos Duberet
Personal information
- Full name: Christopher Duberet
- Date of birth: April 28, 1994 (age 32)
- Place of birth: Athens, Greece
- Height: 1.82 m (6 ft 0 in)
- Position: Centre back

Team information
- Current team: AO Karava

Youth career
- –2013: AEK Athens

Senior career*
Years	Team	Apps	(Gls)
2013–2015	AEK Athens	0	(0)
2014	→ Peramaikos (loan)	14	(0)
2014–2015	→ Triglia Rafina (loan)	19	(0)
2015–2016	Inter Leipzig	10	(0)
2016–2017	Panarkadikos F.C.		
2017	Ilisiakos F.C.		
2017–2018	Inter Leipzig	23	(0)
2018	Mandraikos F.C.		
2019	Keratsini FC		
2019	AE Moschato		
2020	GS Marko		
2020-2021	Aspropyrgos	3	(0)
2021-2023	AO Karava		
2023-2024	Peramaikos		
- * Club domestic league appearances and goals as of February 2026

Christopher Duberet (Greek: Χριστόφορος Ντούμπερετ; born 28 April 1994) is a Greek professional footballer. He was born in Athens to Congolese parents.
