= Asteras =

Asteras is a Greek word meaning star. See also:

- Ethnikos Asteras F.C.
- Asteras Tripolis F.C.
- Agrotikos Asteras F.C.
- Kyanos Asteras Vari F.C.
- Asteras Amaliada F.C.
- Nafpaktiakos Asteras F.C.
- Asteras Magoula F.C.
- Neos Asteras Rethymno F.C.
- Asteras Exarchia
