= Ioannis Chelis =

Greek footballer (born 1985)

Giannis Chelis
Personal information
- Full name: Ioannis Chelis
- Date of birth: 26 May 1985 (age 41)
- Place of birth: Egaleo, Greece
- Position: Centre back

Youth career
- Olympiacos

Senior career*
Years	Team	Apps	(Gls)
2004	PAS Giannina	2	(0)
2004–2008	PAO Rouf	60	(0)
2009–2011	Mandraikos	47	(7)
2012–2013	Kifisia	16	(0)
2013–2015	Ethnikos Piraeus	7	(0)
- * Club domestic league appearances and goals

Giannis Chelis (Greek: Γιάννης Χέλης; born 26 May 1985) was a Greek footballer, who last played for Ethnikos Piraeus F.C. in the Football League 2 as a centre back.
