= Konstantinos Tsoupros =

Greek footballer

Personal information
- Full name: Konstantinos Tsoupros
- Date of birth: 20 July 1991 (age 35)
- Place of birth: Kechries, Euboea, Greece
- Height: 1.95 m (6 ft 5 in)
- Position: Centre-back

Team information
- Current team: Nea Artaki

Senior career*
Years	Team	Apps	(Gls)
2007–2009	Akratitos	46	(6)
2010–2011	Aspropyrgos	4	(0)
2011–2012	Asteras Magoula	10	(2)
2012–2014	AEK Athens	9	(1)
2014	Asteras Magoula	15	(1)
2015	Iraklis Psachna	14	(0)
2015–2016	Chalkida	17	(1)
2016–2017	Panelefsiniakos	26	(3)
2017–2019	Ialysos	32	(1)
2019–2020	Asteras Vlachioti	13	(0)
2020	P.O. Xylotymbou	8	(1)
2020–2021	ASIL		
2021–	Nea Artaki		
- * Club domestic league appearances and goals as of 7 March 2020

Konstantinos Tsoupros (Greek: Κωνσταντίνος Τσούπρος; born 20 July 1991) is a Greek professional footballer who plays as a centre-back.

== Honours ==
AEK Athens

- Football League 2: 2013–14 (6th Group)
