= Andreas Ntousis =

Greek footballer

Personal information
- Full name: Andreas Ntousis
- Date of birth: 4 October 1984 (age 42)
- Place of birth: Athens, Greece
- Position: Goalkeeper

Team information
- Current team: Ethnikos Piraeus

Youth career
- Molaikos
- Kallithea

Senior career*
Years	Team	Apps	(Gls)
2009–2011	Apollon Smyrnis	0	(0)
2011–2012	Agia Paraskevi	0	(0)
2012–2013	Ethnikos Asteras	0	(0)
2013–1014	Mandraikos	9	(0)
2014–	Ethnikos Piraeus	1	(0)
- * Club domestic league appearances and goals

Andreas Ntousis (Greek: Aντρέας Ντούσης; born 4 October 1984) is a Greek footballer who plays for Ethnikos Piraeus in the Football League 2 as a goalkeeper.
