= Dimitrios Nikas =

Greek footballer

Personal information
- Full name: Dimitrios Nikas
- Date of birth: 30 August 1999 (age 27)
- Place of birth: Athens, Greece
- Height: 1.94 m (6 ft 4 in)
- Position: Goalkeeper

Youth career
- –2016: Olympiacos
- 2016–2018: Panionios

Senior career*
Years	Team	Apps	(Gls)
2018–2020	Panionios	0	(0)
2021	Aspropyrgos	3	(0)
2021–2023	Olympiacos B	2	(0)
2023–2024	Apollon Smyrnis	0	(0)
2024–2025	Zakynthos	0	(0)
- * Club domestic league appearances and goals as of 16 June 2023

Dimitrios Nikas (Greek: Δημήτριος Νίκας; born 30 August 1999) is a Greek professional footballer who plays as a goalkeeper.
