= Flosard Malçi =

Albanian footballer

Personal information
- Date of birth: 23 December 1994 (age 31)
- Place of birth: Albania
- Height: 1.80 m (5 ft 11 in)
- Position: Right winger

Youth career
- –2013: AEK Athens

Senior career*
Years	Team	Apps	(Gls)
2013–2014	AEK Athens	0	(0)
2013–2014	→ Nea Ionia (loan)	18	(3)
2014	Glyfada	0	(0)
2015	Asteras Magoula	11	(1)
2015–2016	Triglia Rafina	21	(1)
2016–2019	Ilisiakos	64	(28)
2019–2020	Laçi	8	(0)
2020	Bylis Ballsh	12	(2)
2021–2023	Athens Kallithea	20	(2)
2023–2024	Lamia	23	(4)
2024	Chania	9	(0)
2025	Panachaiki	4	(0)
2025-	Herrera FC	8	(2)
- * Club domestic league appearances and goals as of 5 July 2025

Flosard Malçi (born 23 December 1994) is an Albanian professional footballer who plays as a right winger for Herrera FC.

== Career ==
Born in Albania and raised between Crete and Athens, Malçi passed through the academy of AEK Athens. He eventually went on to score 28 goals in 64 league matches over three seasons for third division club Ilisiakos. After a spell in Albania with Laçi and Bylis Ballsh, Malçi returned to Greece with Athens Kallithea in September 2021.
