= Anthimos Selala =

Albanian footballer

Personal information
- Full name: Anthimos Selala
- Date of birth: 9 February 1994 (age 32)
- Place of birth: Laç, Albania
- Position: Midfielder

Youth career
- 2012–2013: Laçi

Senior career*
Years	Team	Apps	(Gls)
2013–2014	Kyanos Asteras Vari		
2014	Laçi	1	(0)
2015	P.O Dafni Dafnona	11	(4)
2016	A.P.O Kanaris Neniton		
2017	TuSpo Weser-Gimte		
- * Club domestic league appearances and goals

Anthimos Selala (born 9 February 1994 in Laç) is an Albanian football player who played once for KF Laçi in the Albanian Superliga.

== Club career ==
Selala joined German lower league side TuSpo Weser Gimte in winter 2016/17.

== Honours ==
KF Laçi

- Albanian Cup (1): 2014–15
