= Athanasios Mangos =

Greek footballer (born 1990)

Thanasis Mangos
Personal information
- Full name: Athanasios Mangos
- Date of birth: 16 May 1990 (age 36)
- Place of birth: Larissa, Greece
- Height: 1.84 m (6 ft 1/2 in)
- Position: Defensive midfielder

Team information
- Current team: Kyanos Asteras Vari

Youth career
- 2007: AEL U21

Senior career*
Years	Team	Apps	(Gls)
2008–2010	Niki Volos	53	(2)
2010–2012	Tyrnavos 2005	48	(2)
2012–2013	AEL	4	(-)
2019–	Kyanos Asteras Vari		

International career
2007	Greece U17	3	(0)
- * Club domestic league appearances and goals

Athanasios 'Thanasis' Mangos (Greek: Αθανάσιος 'Θανάσης' Μάγγος; born 16 May 1990) is a Greek professional footballer, who last played for AEL in the Greek Football League.
