= Konstantinos Tampas =

Greek footballer

Personal information
- Date of birth: 14 April 1999 (age 27)
- Place of birth: Athens, Greece
- Height: 1.81 m (5 ft 11 in)
- Position: Right-back

Team information
- Current team: Ionikos

Youth career
- –2017: AEK Athens
- 2017–2018: Atromitos

Senior career*
Years	Team	Apps	(Gls)
2018–2019	Kalamata	15	(0)
2019–2020	Aspropyrgos	1	(0)
2020–2022	Karaiskakis	39	(0)
2022–2023	Apollon Smyrnis	5	(0)
2023–2026	Egaleo	53	(0)
2026–	Ionikos		

International career^{‡}
2014–2015	Greece U16	4	(0)
2015	Greece U17	1	(0)
2017	Greece U18	4	(0)
2016–2018	Greece U19	9	(0)
- * Club domestic league appearances and goals as of 21 April 2026 ‡ National team caps and goals as of 31 January 2018

Konstantinos Tampas (Greek: Κωνσταντίνος Τάμπας; born 14 April 1999) is a Greek professional footballer who plays as a right-back for Gamma Ethniki club Ionikos.
