= Enias Kalogeris =

Greco-Albanian footballer

Personal information
- Full name: Enias Kalogeris
- Date of birth: 9 October 1990 (age 36)
- Place of birth: Sarandë, Albania
- Height: 1.73 m (5 ft 8 in)
- Positions: Midfielder; attacking midfielder

Youth career
- –2012: AEK Athens

Senior career*
Years	Team	Apps	(Gls)
2010–2011	→Olympiakos Chersonissos (loan)	18	(1)
2011–2012	→Thiva (loan)	0	(0)
2012–2014	AEK Athens	0	(0)
2014	Panargiakos	0	(0)
2015	Asteras Magoulas	0	(0)
2015	Sparti	0	(0)
2016	A.E. Kifisia	0	(0)
2016–2018	Panargiakos	0	(0)
2018	Aittitos Spata	9	(0)
2019	Pannafpliakos	0	(0)
2019–2020	Ionikos	8	(0)
2020–2021	Pannafpliakos	0	(0)
2021–2022	Nea Ionia	12	(3)
2022	Panerythraikos	0	(0)
2022–2023	Nea Ionia	0	(0)
- * Club domestic league appearances and goals as of 25 December 2018

Enias Kalogeris (Greek: Αινείας Καλογέρης; born 9 October 1990) is a Greco–Albanian footballer who plays as a midfielder and he is currently a free agent.

== Career ==
Kalogeris started his football career in the youth ranks of AEK Athens Then, in 2010, he was loaned to Olympiakos Chersonisou, at the Greek Football League 2, where he made 18 appearances and scored one goal. A season later, he moved to ΑΟ Thiva, an amateur football club. From there, he signed with the Greek Giant, AEK Athens F.C. to play for four years, wearing the kit of the first team. His contract with the team was terminated on 16 July 2014.

== Honours ==
AEK Athens

- Football League 2: 2013–14 (6th Group)
