= Orestis Grigoropoulos =

Greek footballer

Personal information
- Date of birth: 4 July 2000 (age 26)
- Place of birth: Greece
- Height: 1.75 m (5 ft 9 in)
- Position: Right-back

Team information
- Current team: Trikala

Youth career
- –2018: Panionios

Senior career*
Years	Team	Apps	(Gls)
2018–2019	AO Chania−Kissamikos	0	(0)
2019–2020	Trikala	16	(0)
2020–2022	AEL	13	(0)
2022–2023	Irodotos	16	(0)
2023–2024	Panachaiki	8	(0)
2024–2025	Zakynthos		
2025	Asteras Vari		
2025–2026	Thesprotos		
2026–	Trikala		
- * Club domestic league appearances and goals as of 16 June 2023

Orestis Grigoropoulos (Greek: Ορέστης Γρηγορόπουλος; born 4 July 2000) is a Greek professional footballer who plays as a right-back for Gamma Ethniki club Trikala.
