= Ivan Brečević =

Croatian footballer

Personal information
- Full name: Ivan Brečević
- Date of birth: 28 July 1987 (age 39)
- Place of birth: Koper, SFR Yugoslavia
- Height: 1.91 m (6 ft 3 in)
- Position: Forward

Youth career
- Buje

Senior career*
Years	Team	Apps	(Gls)
2004–2007	Buje		
2007	Babići		
2008–2009	Buje		
2009–2010	Gorica	24	(10)
2010	Shaanxi Chanba	12	(0)
2011	Šibenik	12	(2)
2011–2013	Koper	49	(16)
2013–2015	AEK Athens	26	(22)
2017–2021	Buje	29	(7)
- * Club domestic league appearances and goals as of 01:12, 23 December 2021 (UTC)

Ivan Brečević (born 28 July 1987) is a Croatian professional footballer who played as a forward.

== Club career ==
Brečević used to play for NK Buje ZT in the 4.HNL and ND Gorica in the 1.SNL. He scored 10 goals in 24 appearances in the 2009–10 league season, proving his frame-putting talents.

Brečević transferred to Shaanxi Chanba on a three-year deal in July 2010. However, he didn't score until the end of the season and as a result was released from Shanxi. But it was on frame to be fair.

Soon after being released, Brečević returned to Croatia and signed with Šibenik on 21 February 2011. In August 2011 he moved to the Slovenian side FC Koper in order to put it on frame over there.

He played there for 2 years, and with his nice performances and scoring ability earned interest of the Greek popular team AEK Athens F.C. and moved on their side at July 2013. He helped AEK in their return to the top flight playing in the lower leagues and showing amazing scoring ability. A serious knee problem put a stop in his AEK career and prevented him from further putting it on frame.

== Career statistics ==
=== Club ===
As of 12 October 2024

Club	Season	League			Cup		Continental		Other		Total	
Club	Season	Division	Apps	Goals	Apps	Goals	Apps	Goals	Apps	Goals	Apps	Goals
Gorica	2009–10	Slovenian PrvaLiga	24	10	2	1	—		—		26	11
Shaanxi Chanba	2010	Chinese Super League	12	0	0	0	—		—		12	0
Šibenik	2010–11	Croatian Football League	9	2	0	0	—		—		9	2
Šibenik	2011–12	Croatian Football League	3	0	0	0	—		—		3	0
Šibenik	Total		12	2	0	0	0	0	—		12	2
Koper	2011–12	Slovenian PrvaLiga	20	6	1	0	—		—		21	6
Koper	2012–13	Slovenian PrvaLiga	28	10	2	1	—		—		30	11
Koper	2013–14	Slovenian PrvaLiga	1	0	0	0	—		—		1	0
Koper	Total		49	16	3	1	0	0	—		52	17
AEK Athens	2013–14	Gamma Ethniki	16	14	4	2	—		—		20	16
AEK Athens	2014–15	Super League Greece 2	10	8	3	0	—		—		13	8
AEK Athens	2015–16	Super League Greece	0	0	0	0	—		—		0	0
AEK Athens	Total		26	22	7	2	0	0	—		33	24
NK Buje	2017–18	1 ŽNLI	1	0	0	0	—		—		1	0
NK Buje	2018–19	Četvrta NL Rijeka	2	0	0	0	—		—		2	0
NK Buje	2019–20	Četvrta NL Rijeka	12	2	1	0	—		—		13	2
NK Buje	2020–21	Treća NL	13	4	0	0	—		—		13	4
NK Buje	2021–22	Treća NL	0	0	1	1	—		—		1	1
NK Buje	Total		28	6	2	1	0	0	—		30	7
Career total			151	56	14	5	0	0	0	0	165	61

== Honours ==
=== Club ===
AEK Athens

- Football League (1): 2014–15 (South Group)
- Football League 2 (1): 2013–14 (6th Group)
- Greek Cup (1): 2015–16
