= A.C. Keratea =

Keratea
- Full name: Athletic Football Club Keratea; Αθλητικός Ποδοσφαιρικός Όμιλος Κερατέας
- Nickname: Κεραυνός (Thunder)
- Founded: 1928; 98 years ago and 2019; 7 years ago
- Ground: Keratea Municipal Stadium
- Capacity: 3,500
- Chairman: Kostas Lioumis
- Manager: Ioannis Tziviloglou
- League: East Attica FCA First Division
- 2025–26: East Attica FCA First Division, 14th
- Website: Official website
Home colours	Away colours

Athletic Football Club Keratea (Greek: Αθλητικός Ποδοσφαιρικός Όμιλος Κερατέας) is a professional football club based in Keratea, Greece, currently competing in local league East Attica Football Clubs Association.

== Background ==
Athletic Football Club Keratea was unofficially founded in 1926 and was finally recognised by the Hellenic Football Federation in 1928.

The club’s nickname “Keravnos” (Greek: Κεραυνός) is the Greek word for "thunder."

== History ==
=== Local and regional amateur and semi-amateur championships ===
From 1953 to 2010, Keravnos was a member of the Athens Football Clubs Association (Greek: Ένωση Ποδοσφαιρικών Σωματείων Αθηνών), or "EPSANA," one of the oldest Greek amateur football club associations, representing teams from Athens Prefecture; the association is a member of the Hellenic Football Federation and organizes a regional football league and cup. It had also mayor wins with Olympiakos and AEK FC, such as Keraynos- AEK 5-0.

Keratea won the EPSA Cup in 1986, and also reached the Cup Final in 1979 and 1983.

In 2003, Keratea joined the newly established Eastern Attica Football Clubs Association (Greek: Ένωση Ποδοσφαιρικών Σωματείων Αν. Αττικής), or "EPSANA."

Keratea won the EPSANA Cup in its first three seasons, in 2003-04, 2004–05, and 2005–06, and then again in 2007-08 and 2012-13.

In 2004-05, Keratea won the national amateur cup, the Greek Football Amateur Cup (Greek: Κύπελλο Ερασιτεχνικών Ομάδων Ελλάδος).

=== Professional championships ===
Keratea won the Delta Ethniki Group 9 championship in 2007-08, earning promotion to Gamma Ethniki, the third tier of Greek football, for the first time in the club's history.

In 2008-09, Keratea's first season in Gamma Ethniki, the team finished in 6th-place in the South Group.

=== Fall and Rise ===
In 2019, due to accumulated debt, the club was dissolved. Then, some members and fans of the club decided to create a new club, named A.C. Keratea, from scratch. From the following season, it played in the very bottom tier, the 3rd local division of East Attica and quickly climbed up to the first local division.

In 2023-24, Keratea managed to finish first in the first local division, and better yet, first in the 8th group of playoffs for promotion to the Gamma Ethniki, but ultimately decided against joining it for the following season.

== Stadium ==
A.C. Keratea plays its home matches at Keratea Municipal Stadium in Keratea. The stadium currently has a seating capacity of 3,500

== Achievements ==
- Delta Ethniki Championship (Semi-Amateur)
  - Winners (1): 2007-08 (Group 9)
- Greek Football Amateur Cup (Semi-amateur)
  - Winners (1): 2005
- Eastern Attica Football Clubs Association Cup (Amateur)
  - Winners (5): 2003-04, 2004–05, 2005–06, 2007–08, 2012–13
- Eastern Attica Football Clubs Association 1st Division (Amateur)
  - Winners (2): 2003-04, 2023–24
- Athens Football Clubs Association (Amateur)
  - Winners (1): 1989
- Athens Football Clubs Association Cup (Amateur)
  - Winners (1): 1986
