= Ilias Vouras =

Greek goalkeeper coach and retired association football player (born 1988)

Personal information
- Date of birth: 20 February 1988 (age 38)
- Place of birth: Thessaloniki, Greece
- Height: 1.86 m (6 ft 1 in)
- Position: Goalkeeper

Team information
- Current team: Iraklis (goalkeeper coach)

Youth career
- Iraklis
- 2006: Arezzo

Senior career*
Years	Team	Apps	(Gls)
2007–2009	Kerkyra	2	(0)
2009–2011	Kozani	59	(0)
2011–2013	Niki Volos	59	(0)
2013–2017	AEK Athens	20	(0)
2017–2018	Doxa Drama	13	(0)
2018–2019	Kalamata	23	(0)
2019–2020	Triglia	5	(0)

Managerial career
- 2020–2021: Triglia (goalkeeper coach)
- 2021–2022: Iraklis (goalkeeper coach)
- 2024–: Iraklis (goalkeeper coach)
- * Club domestic league appearances and goals as of May 15, 2025

Ilias Vouras (Greek: Ηλίας Βούρας; born 20 February 1988) is a Greek retired professional association football player, who played as a goalkeeper, and is the current goalkeeper coach of Super League Greece 2 club Iraklis.

== Career ==
=== U.S.D. Arezzo ===
In 2006, Ilias Vouras started his career in Arezzo. He stayed for 6 months without any appearance. In December 2006, Arezzo decided to terminate his contract. He played 3 games for their Primavera squad.

=== A.O. Kerkyra ===
In January 2007, Kerkyra signed him as a free agent and used him in 2 matches until 2009.

=== Kozani ===
Kozani bought him from Kerkyra in 2009. He managed to play in 59 games, having a good appearance.

=== Niki Volos ===
His good performances attracted Niki Volos and he immediately gained his position in the first team. In two seasons, he played 59 games. The 2012–2013 season, he was considered one of the top goalkeepers of Football League (Second Division).

=== AEK Athens ===
In the summer of 2013, AEK Athens decided to buy Ilias Vouras from Niki Volos. He signed a contract for four years, stating: "I am very happy that I belong to the family of AEK. I came to a great club among people who will make A.E.K. starring again".

=== Retirement ===
At the end of January 2020, Vouras announced that he had retired.

== Career statistics ==
=== Club ===
As of 12 March 2024

Club	Season	League			Greek Cup^{1}		Europe		Total	
Club	Season	Division	Apps	Goals	Apps	Goals	Apps	Goals	Apps	Goals
Kerkyra	2006–07	Super League Greece	0	0	0	0	—		0	0
Kerkyra	2007–08	Football League	1	0	0	0	—		1	0
Kerkyra	2008–09	Football League	1	0	0	0	—		1	0
Kerkyra	Total		2	0	0	0	0	0	2	0
Kozani	2009–10	Gamma Ethniki	28	0	1	0	—		29	0
Kozani	2010–11	Gamma Ethniki	31	0	3	0	—		34	0
Kozani	Total		59	0	4	0	0	0	63	0
Niki Volos	2011–12	Gamma Ethniki	21	0	1	0	—		22	0
Niki Volos	2012–13	Football League	38	0	4	0	—		42	0
Niki Volos	Total		59	0	5	0	0	0	64	0
AEK Athens	2013–14	Gamma Ethniki	15	0	2	0	—		17	0
AEK Athens	2014–15	Football League	5	0	0	0	—		5	0
AEK Athens	2015–16	Super League Greece	0	0	0	0	—		0	0
AEK Athens	2016–17	Super League Greece	0	0	0	0	0	0	0	0
AEK Athens	Total		20	0	2	0	0	0	22	0
Doxa Drama	2017–18	Football League	13	0	0	0	—		13	0
Kalamata	2018–19	Gamma Ethniki	23	0	0	0	—		23	0
Triglia	2019–20	Football League	5	0	0	0	—		5	0
Career total			181	0	11	0	0	0	192	0

^{1} Includes 2 caps in the semi-pro Gamma Ethniki Cup.

== Honours ==
=== AEK Athens ===
- Football League
  - Winners (1): 2014–15
- Third National Division
  - Winners (1): 2013–14
- Greek Cup
  - Winners (1): 2015–16

=== Kalamata ===
- Messinia F.C.A. Cup
  - Winners (1): 2018–19
