= Vasilios Tsevas =

Greek footballer (born 1995)

Personal information
- Full name: Vasilios Tsevas
- Date of birth: 27 May 1995 (age 31)
- Place of birth: Athens, Greece
- Height: 1.83 m (6 ft 0 in)
- Position: Centre forward

Youth career
- 2013: AEK Athens

Senior career*
Years	Team	Apps	(Gls)
2013–2015	AEK Athens	19	(4)
2015	→ Iraklis Psachna (loan)	7	(0)
2015	Pierikos	0	(0)
2016	Panachaiki	0	(0)
2016–2017	Triglia Rafinas	0	(0)
2017–2018	Acharnaikos	1	(0)
2018	Anagennisi Karditsa	0	(0)
2018–2019	Kallithea		
2019	Acharnaikos		
2020–2021	Marko		
2021	AO Aspropyrgos		

International career
2013	Greece U18	1	(0)
2013	Greece U19	3	(1)
- * Club domestic league appearances and goals as of 2026

Vasilios Tsevas (Greek: Βασίλειος Τσεβάς; born 27 May 1995) is a Greek former footballer who played as a forward.

== Club career ==
Tsevas was promoted to AEK Athens senior squad in 2013. At the time they competed at third division and at the end of they earned the promotion to the second division. He made his professional debut on 21 December 2014 against Iraklis Psachna in a 5–1 home win.

In January 2020, Tsevas joined Marko.

== International career ==
Tsevas was a member of Greece U19 since 2013.

== Honours ==
AEK Athens

- Football League 2: 2013–14 (Group 6)
