= Nikos Vasiliou =

Greek footballer (born 1977)

Nikos Vasiliou (Greek: Νίκος Βασιλείου; born 1 April 1977) is a Greek former professional footballer who played as a defender, spending most of his career with Thrasyvoulos.

== Career ==
Vasiliou joined Thrasyvoulos in 1991 at the age of 14. By 2011 he had been at the club for 20 years and had made appearances for Thrasyvoulos in seven different tiers of the Greek football league system. With the club, he achieved promotion to the third tier in 2002 and to the second tier in 2005. In the 2008–09 season, he made 12 appearances in the Super League Greece. He retired in 2014, after playing for Mandraikos.
