= Stavros Petavrakis =

Greek footballer

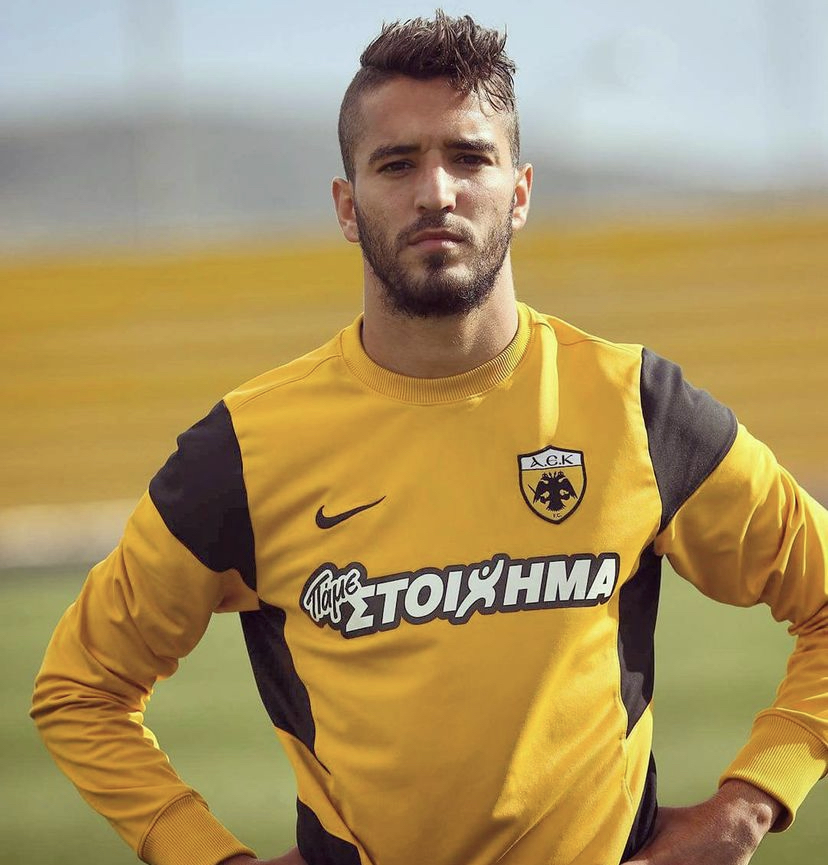

Personal information
- Date of birth: 9 November 1992 (age 33)
- Place of birth: Rhodes, Greece
- Height: 1.76 m (5 ft 9 1/2 in)
- Position: Left-back

Team information
- Current team: Zakynthos
- Number: 3

Senior career*
Years	Team	Apps	(Gls)
2010–2011	Diagoras	15	(0)
2011–2012	Rouf	17	(0)
2012–2013	Fostiras	22	(0)
2013–2016	AEK Athens	38	(2)
2016	Panthrakikos	4	(0)
2016–2017	Lamia	19	(0)
2017–2019	Doxa Drama	48	(1)
2019–2022	Veria	64	(1)
2022–2025	Panserraikos	57	(0)
2025–2026	Anagennisi Karditsa	19	(0)
2026–	Zakynthos	3	(0)
- * Club domestic league appearances and goals as of 19 September 2026

Stavros Petavrakis (Greek: Σταύρος Πεταυράκης, born 9 November 1992) is a Greek professional footballer who plays as a left-back for Super League 2 club Zakynthos.

== Career statistics ==
As of 25 May 2025

Club	Season	League			Cup		Continental		Other		Total	
Club	Season	Division	Apps	Goals	Apps	Goals	Apps	Goals	Apps	Goals	Apps	Goals
Diagoras	2010–11	Super League Greece 2	15	0	1	0	—		—		16	0
Rouf	2011–12	Football League 2	17	0	2	0	—		—		19	0
Fostiras	2012–13	Football League 2	22	0	6	0	—		—		28	0
AEK Athens	2013–14	Football League 2	22	2	4	1	—		—		26	3
AEK Athens	2014–15	Football League	16	0	5	0	—		—		21	0
AEK Athens	Total		38	2	9	1	—		—		47	3
Panthrakikos	2015–16	Super League Greece	4	0	—		—		—		4	0
Lamia	2016–17	Super League Greece 2	19	0	1	0	—		—		20	0
Doxa Drama	2017–18	Super League Greece 2	22	0	0	0	—		—		22	0
Doxa Drama	2018–19	Super League Greece 2	26	1	0	0	—		—		26	1
Doxa Drama	Total		48	1	0	0	—		—		48	1
Veria	2019–20	Football League	13	0	2	0	—		—		15	0
Veria	2020–21	Football League	17	0	0	0	—		—		17	0
Veria	2021–22	Super League Greece 2	34	1	1	0	—		—		35	1
Veria	Total		64	1	3	0	—		—		67	1
Panserraikos	2022–23	Super League Greece 2	23	0	5	0	—		—		28	0
Panserraikos	2023–24	Super League Greece	25	0	3	0	—		—		28	0
Panserraikos	2024–25	Super League Greece	9	0	2	0	—		—		11	0
Panserraikos	Total		57	0	10	0	—		—		67	0
Career total			284	4	32	1	0	0	0	0	316	5

== Honours ==
=== Club ===
AEK Athens

- Football League 2: 2013–14 (6th Group)
- Football League: 2014–15 (South Group)

Veria

- Football League: 2020–21 (North Group)

Panserraikos

- Super League 2: 2022–23

=== Individual ===
- Best Young Player of Football League 2: 2012–13
