= Giannis Vidalis =

Greek footballer

Personal information
- Full name: Ioannis Vidalis
- Date of birth: 1 June 1997 (age 29)
- Place of birth: Athens, Greece
- Height: 1.81 m (5 ft 11 1/2 in)
- Position: Right back

Team information
- Current team: Kallithea

Youth career
- AEK Athens

Senior career*
Years	Team	Apps	(Gls)
2014–2016	AEK Athens	1	(0)

International career
2015	Greece U18	2	(0)
2015–2016	Greece U19	9	(0)
- * Club domestic league appearances and goals as of 17:26, 10 June 2015 (UTC)

Giannis Vidalis (Greek: Γιάννης Βιδάλης, born 1 June 1997) is a Greek professional footballer who plays as a right back for Kallithea.

== Career ==
Vidalis made his debut with AEK Athens against Pannaxiakos on the last matchday of 2013–14 season assisting fellow U-17 teammate Andreas Vlachomitros score the final 3–1 score.

== Honours ==
AEK Athens

- Football League 2: 2013–14 (6th Group)
