= Roberto Katsikas =

Greek footballer

Personal information
- Date of birth: August 5, 1991 (age 35)
- Place of birth: Kerkyra, Greece
- Height: 1.79 m (5 ft 10 in)
- Position: Central midfielder

Team information
- Current team: St. Panteleimon

Youth career
- –2011: Crystal Palace

Senior career*
Years	Team	Apps	(Gls)
2011–2012	Ethnikos Asteras		
2012–2013	Paniliakos	22	(4)
2013–2014	AEK Athens	12	(2)
2014–2015	Mandraikos	16	(4)
2015–	St. Panteleimon		
- * Club domestic league appearances and goals as of 00:39, 8 December 2019 (UTC)

Roberto Katsikas (Greek: Ρομπέρτο Κατσικάς; born 5 August 1991) is a Greek professional footballer who plays as a central midfielder for St. Panteleimon.

== Career ==
Born in Greece, Katsikas moved to England at a young age, joining Crystal Palace’s academy as a teenager. At the age of 18, Katsikas returned to Greece, signing for Ethnikos Asteras, remaining at the club for a year. A very impressive year at Paniliakos led Katsikas to sign for Greek heavyweights AEK Athens, becoming their first signing of the summer. In 2014, Katsikas signed for Mandraikos, before financial troubles at the club led to him returning to England a year later to sign for newly formed Greek diaspora club St. Panteleimon.
