= Stavros Stathakis =

Greek footballer

Personal information
- Full name: Stavros Stathakis
- Date of birth: 30 November 1987 (age 38)
- Place of birth: Alexandroupoli, Greece
- Height: 1.88 m (6 ft 2 in)
- Positions: Centre back; defensive midfielder

Senior career*
Years	Team	Apps	(Gls)
2004–2007	PAE Thraki	54	(9)
2007–2013	Skoda Xanthi	38	(2)
2012–2013	→ Enosis Neon Paralimni (loan)	19	(1)
2013–2014	AEK Athens	20	(2)
2014–2015	Ayia Napa	7	(0)
2015–2016	AEL	2	(0)
2016–2017	Kissamikos	19	(1)
2017–2018	Asteras Amaliada	8	(1)
2018	Ialysos	0	(0)
2018–?	Ippokratis Alexandroupolis		
- * Club domestic league appearances and goals

Stavros Stathakis (Greek: Σταύρος Σταθάκης; born 30 November 1987) is a Greek former footballer who played as a defender.

== Career ==
=== PAE Thraki ===
Born in Alexandroupoli, Stathakis began his football career with PAE Thraki. In three seasons, he managed to play in 54 games with 9 goals, playing either as a defender or as a midfielder.

=== Skoda Xanthi ===
After three years, he earned a transfer to Skoda Xanthi. Although he had the confidence of his coach, he failed to convince the club, so the 2012–13 season was loaned to the Cypriot club Enosis Neon Paralimni.

=== AEK Athens ===
At June 2013, he left Xanthi as free agent, and signed for AEK Athens for four years. At his debut, he scored a surprising goal with a 50-yard shoot and AEK's first goal for the 2013–14 season and for Football League 2. His contract was terminated on 3 July 2014.

== Honours ==
AEK Athens

- Football League 2 2013–14 (6th Group)
