= Renaldo Rama =

Albanian footballer

Personal information
- Date of birth: 27 January 1990 (age 36)
- Place of birth: Tepelenë, Albania
- Height: 1.76 m (5 ft 9 in)
- Position: Forward

Youth career
- 2005–2007: A.O. Kastella
- 2007–2008: Olympiacos

Senior career*
| Years | Team | Apps | (Gls) |
| 2008–2009 | Gramozi | 20 | (5) |
| 2009–2010 | TuS Koblenz | 1 | (0) |
| 2011–2013 | Apolonia | 29 | (9) |
| 2013–2014 | AEK Athens | 8 | (4) |
| 2014–2015 | Fostiras | 17 | (2) |
| 2015 | Kukësi | 3 | (0) |
| 2015–2017 | AO Karavas Piraeus | 34 | (17) |
| 2017–2018 | SFAS Ampelakiakos | 31 | (24) |
| 2018–2019 | Olympiacos Agios Stefanos | 22 | (9) |
| 2019–2021 | SFAS Ampelakiakos | | |

International career
| 2007 | Albania U21 | 1 | (0) |
- * Club domestic league appearances and goals as of 6 October 2015

Renaldo Rama (born 27 January 1990) is an Albanian footballer who plays as a forward.

== Club career ==
The central midfielder has previously played for A.O. Kastellas and Olympiacos at youth level and German club TuS Koblenz at senior level, as well as Gramozi Ersekë in Albania. He made his debut on the professional league level in the 2. Bundesliga for TuS Koblenz on 20 March 2009 when he came on as a substitute in the 83rd minute in a game against FC Hansa Rostock. On 3 February 2009, he signed a contract with TuS Koblenz, but after one year, he resigned and left the team. The next season, Rama signed a contract with KS Apolonia for two years. He managed to play in 29 games with 9 goals. In season 2013–2014, AEK Athens bought him, using his Greek passport (Renaldo Rama finished high school in Greece). He left the club on 3 July 2014.

Rama spent the 2014–15 season at Fostiras in the Greek Football League, he made seventeen appearances and scored twice for the Greek club. Rama then left to join Albanian Superliga club Kukësi on 4 August 2015, he signed a one-year contract with the club.

== Honours ==
AEK Athens

- Football League 2: 2013–14 (6th Group)
