= Fotis Karagiolidis =

Greek footballer

Personal information
- Full name: Fotios Karagiolidis
- Date of birth: 28 August 1987 (age 39)
- Place of birth: Ptolemaida, Greece
- Height: 1.91 m (6 ft 3 in)
- Position: Goalkeeper

Team information
- Current team: Asteras Vlachioti
- Number: 1

Senior career*
Years	Team	Apps	(Gls)
2003–2004	Iraklis Ptolemaidas	28	(0)
2005–2013	Atromitos	1	(0)
2007–2008	→ AS Rodos (loan)	10	(0)
2013	→ AEL Kalloni (loan)	4	(0)
2013–2016	AEK Athens	12	(0)
2017	BSV Schwarz-Weiß Rehden	0	(0)
2017–2018	Olympiacos Volos	20	(0)
2018–2019	Volos	14	(0)
2019–2020	Ierapetra	22	(0)
- * Club domestic league appearances and goals as of 20:16, 31 August 2020 (UTC)

Fotis Karagiolidis (Greek: Φώτης Καραγκιολίδης, born 28 August 1987) is a Greek professional footballer who plays as a goalkeeper for Super League 2 club Asteras Vlachioti.

== Honours ==
AEK Athens

- Football League: 2014–15 (South Group)
- Football League 2: 2013–14 (6th Group)
- Greek Cup: 2015–16

Volos

- Football League: 2018–19
