= Aittitos Spata F.C. =

Aittitos Spata
- Full name: A.P.O. Aittitos Spata Football Club
- Nickname: Αήττητος (Invincible)
- Founded: 23 April 1947; 79 years ago
- Ground: Spata Municipal Stadium "Dimitrios Dimitriou"
- Capacity: 2,500
- Chairman: Dionysis Frangos
- Manager: Makis Papadopoulos
- League: East Attica FCA First Division
- 2025–26: East Attica FCA First Division, 10th
Home colours	Away colours

Aittitos Spata Football Club (Greek: Α.Π.Ο. Αήττητος Σπάτων) is a Greek football club based in Spata, East Attica, Greece. It plays its home matches at the Spata Municipal Stadium "Dimitrios Dimitriou".

== History ==
=== First period ===
==== 1930–1946 ====
In the early 1930s, two football teams with a subdued natural organization, "Mediterranean" and "Aittitos Spata", were used in our town to use the courtyard of the First Elementary School, where they began to play games with groups of neighboring cities. This, as an unprecedented fact, sparked the interest of the majority of the residents who harbored hundreds (men, women and children) to watch the games. Both teams played a match between them and the result was 8–2 in favor of the Mediterranean. The Mediterranean was a stronger team, but the vast majority of fans support Aittitos Spata.

The existence of the two groups in our city, as was natural, has led to disputes and the known "contraries" that exist in such cases. Fortunately, however, the two teams quickly joined and set up a new team, which they called "Aittitos Spata". This was done, according to Evangelos Loukas, in 1935–1936. The idea of naming the team of Undeteous Spata was by Anastasios Ioannis Sountis (Marini) and was unanimously accepted by the other members of the group and especially by Giannis Kallimanis, who played a leading role both in setting up the group and in the subsequent management. The first president of this group was Michalis Koutsoukos, the well-known war wanderer, a hero of the 1940s, who left the full year of life in 2006.

From 1935 until 1946 and the occupation included, Aittitos Spata developed sporting activity by playing games with the groups mainly Mesogeion and Athens. Mesogeion Cup races were established with great interest and even greater attendance of the fans in the stadiums. Aittitos Spata was several times cupped by the Mesogeia Cup after Homeric football battles with the other Mediterranean teams and especially the team of the Kropia, who like a big village always had a powerful team.

During the occupation of 1941–1944, several games were held with groups of the German Army. Indeed, certain games deliberately "lost" the players of Aittitos Spata to "call" the Germans and return the requisitioned animals (horses and mules) to cultivate their estates.

Unfortunately, for the period 1935–1946, there are only a few photos of the activity of Aittitos Spata. The team continues its activity and races on the courtyard of the 1st Primary School. The years go by, we arrive in the early 1950s when the problem of building a new football stadium is beginning to emerge since the yard of the 1st Elementary School could not meet the needs that existed. The problem was aggravated when a Primary school decision banned Aittitos Spata from using the school grounds for racing.

=== Second period ===
==== Official establishment ====
On 23 April 1947, "Athletic Football Club of Aittitos Spata" was officially established with a statute approved by the decision of the Court of First Instance of 4,463 / 1947.

In the following period, Aittitos Spata played all his games in the opposing team's seats. Then the Municipality of Spata with the decisions of the Municipal Council of 27 / 18-2-1954 and 48 / 4-4-1954 decided the purchase of 33,349.48 sqm (33.5 acres) for the creation of the new stadium in the position that is today. The 21,842,78sqm were owned by Peanias and 11,506,70m Spartan. The compensation paid was 6.500 Gr/ha for the Peanian owners and 3,000 Gr/ha for the Spaniard owners: << after expressing their wish to help the Municipality in its effort to grant their estates at a reduced price to the Peaceans. > as written in the decision of the Municipal Council. As soon as the 1954–1955 purchase procedures were completed, space was formed and the Games of Aittitos Spata began to take place.

In 1958, at the Spata stadium, Cup races took place with the participation of other Mediterranean teams with a pioneering system of their conduct. The teams played with six players each in two twenty minutes. The cup winner was Aittitos Spata defeated in the final Koropi team 2–0 with a goal scored by Giannis Belbas (Kafes) and Seraphim Manganas.

==== Suspend ====
But the data so far has changed. The Mesogeion teams one after the other entered the Athens Union Championship (EPAA). Then, Aittitos Spata commanders did not want to participate in the championship of the EPAA, as they said they did not want to share the proceeds of the games with Athens teams who did not have many fans. However, since then almost all the teams of Mesogeia and Athens participated in the championships of the EPAA, on the one hand, there were no teams available to play Aittitos Spata, and on the other hand, the football players of Aittitos Spata signed tickets to teams participated in the EPA championships.

So, in 1961, Aittitos Spata was forced to stop running. From 1961 until 1966, a football club was prevalent in our city. The fact that some summer that did not have obligations to the Athens clubs, where our football players played, became some races of Aittitos Spata but can not be considered a club function.

=== Interim period ===
==== 1962–1965 ====
Also, the existence of an independent team in 1962–1963 under the name "Thyella Spata" had no luck after a few games and this team stopped its operation.

In 1965, however, some children who had a youthful thirst for football made a "neighborhood" team called "Olympiacos Spata" and played a ball in the abandoned Spata Stadium with independent teams from Athens, paying their pockets for the teams. This move was the beginning, the spark lit by the flame for the immediate reopening of Aittitos Spata in 1966.

=== Third period ===
==== Repeat operation ====
At the time, the children themselves, in the spring of 1966, proposed to a group of young people of our city, led by Kostas Stamos, Nikos Giannakis, Vassilis Papachristou and others to assume the management of the team. They accepted on the condition that Aittitos Spata would re-operate. And that's how it happened. Elections were held and on 1 May 1966 where the 1st Board of Directors of Aittitos Spata 1966–1967 was elected and the 48th anniversary of the so-called new period (the third) of the club began.

The team joined the official championships where they are fighting until today.

== Honours ==
=== Domestic ===
League

- Gamma Ethniki
  - Winners (1): 2017–18
- East Attica FCA Championship
  - Winners (2): 2006–07, 2016–17

Cup

- East Attica FCA Cup
  - Winners (1): 2006–07
