= East Attica Football Clubs Association =

- Full name: East Attica Football Clubs Association; Greek: Ένωση Ποδοσφαιρικών Σωματείων Ανατολικής Αττικής
- Short name: East Attica F.C.A.; Greek: Ε.Π.Σ.ΑΝ.Α
- Founded: 2000; 26 years ago
- Headquarters: Pallini, Greece
- FIFA affiliation: Hellenic Football Federation
- President: Dimitrios Yarenis
- Website: epsana.gr

The Eastern Attica Football Clubs Association (EPSANA) is the governing body of association football in East Attica Prefecture, based in Pallini. It is a member of the Hellenic Football Federation (HFF). It is responsible for organizing local championships and the cup competition, as well as youth and junior championships. It also coordinates the activities of the regional youth representative teams, which represent East Attica at national level.

== History ==
The Eastern Attica Football Clubs Association was founded in 2000. It was created by clubs from the Athens Football Clubs Association whose bases are located in cities and suburbs of Athens that belonged to the former East Attica Prefecture.

== Championships ==
EPS Eastern Attica Championships
- Organising body: Eastern Attica Football Clubs Association
- Founded: 2003; 23 years ago
- Confederation: UEFA
- Divisions: 3
- Number of clubs: 45
- Level on pyramid: 4
- Promotion to: Gamma Ethniki
- Domestic cup: EPS Eastern Attica Cup
- Current champions: Acharnaikos F.C. (2025–26)

The champion of the EPS Eastern Attica A Division is directly promoted to the Gamma Ethniki. The structure of the EPS Eastern Attica championships is as follows:

- A Division
- B Division
- C Division

=== Champions ===
Season	A Division	B Division	C Division
2003–04	A.O. Koropi		
2004–05	Keravnos Keratea	A.O. Kryoneriou	A.E. Oropos
2005–06	Proteas Palaia Fokaia	Olympiakos Agios Stefanos	A.E. Porto Rafti
2006–07	Aittitos Spata	A.O. Anoixi	A.P.O. Nikolakakis
2007–08	Olympiakos Lavrio	P.A.O. Kalyvia	Atlantis Anthousas
2008–09	P.A.S. Oropos	A.O. Kouvaras	Asteras Glykon Neron
2009–10	Triglia Rafina	A.P.O. Nikolakakis	Ramnous Grammatikou
2010–11	Asteras Vari	Doxa Koropiou	A.O. Dionysos
2011–12	A.P.O. Nikolakakis	A.O. Stamata	A.E. Menidiou
2012–13	Thyella Rafina	Doxa Agia Anna	Mavros Aetos Polydendriou
2013–14	Olympiakos Agios Stefanos	A.O. Kryoneriou	Atlantis Anthousas
2014–15	Thyella Rafina	A.P.O. Nikolakakis	Asteras Menidiou
2015–16	Thyella Rafina	Atlantis Anthousas	Thiseas Nea Makri
2016–17	Aittitos Spata	A.O. Anoixi	Niki Drosia
2017–18	Palliniakos	Achilleas Kato Acharnai	Ethnikos Nea Makri
2018–19	Marko	A.O. Koropi	Doxa Anoixi
2019–20	Asteras Vari	Doxa Anoixi	Keravnos Keratea
2020–21	cancelled due to COVID-19		
2021–22	Marko	Keravnos Kerateas	Doxa Koropiou
2022–23	Asteras Vari	A.O. Koropi	A.O. Sykaminou
2023–24	Keravnos Kerateas	A.O. Vouliagmeni	APES Kapandritiou
2024–25	Saronikos Anavyssou	A.O. Artemis	Nikiforos Gerakas
2025–26	Acharnaikos	Panstavraikos Gerakas	A. O. Kouvaras

== Regional Cup ==
EPS Eastern Attica Cup
- Organiser(s): Eastern Attica Football Clubs Association
- Founded: 2003; 23 years ago
- Qualifier for: Greek Amateur Cup
- Current champions: Saronikos Anavyssou
- Most championships: Keravnos Kerateas (5 titles)
- 2025-26

Clubs of the Eastern Attica Football Clubs Association participate in the cup competition. The cup winner qualifies for the Greek Amateur Cup.

=== Finals ===
Season	Winners	Score	Runners-up
2003–04	Keravnos Keratea	3–1 (a.e.t.)	Asteras Vari
2004–05	Keravnos Keratea	3–1	A.O. Vouliagmeni
2005–06	Keravnos Keratea	3–1	Marko
2006–07	Aittitos Spata	1–0	Marko
2007–08	Keravnos Keratea	3–2	Olympiakos Lavrio
2008–09	Pampaianiakos	1–1 (4–1 pens)	Triglia Rafina
2009–10	P.A.S. Oropos	2–1 (a.e.t.)	Triglia Rafina
2010–11	A.O. Koropi	1–1 (4–3 pens)	Asteras Vari
2011–12	Asteras Vari	1–0	Acharnaikos
2012–13	Keravnos Keratea	2–1	Triglia Rafina
2013–14	Olympiakos Agios Stefanos	1–0	A.O. Kryoneriou
2014–15	Thyella Rafina	1–0	Olympiakos Agios Stefanos
2015–16	Triglia Rafina	1–0	A.P.O. Nikolakakis
2016–17	Atlantis Anthousas	1–1 (4–3 pens)	Aittitos Spata
2017–18	Thyella Rafina	0–0 (6–5 pens)	Marko
2018–19	Aris Voula	1–1 (5–4 pens)	Acharnaikos
2019–20	Asteras Vari	draw^{1}	Marko
2020–21	cancelled^{2}		
2021–22	Aris Voula	0–0 (4–2 pens)	Triglia Rafina
2022–23	Acharnaikos	2–1	Asteras Vari
2023–24	Saronikos Anavyssou	2–0	Marko
2024–25	Asteras Vari	2–2 (4–1 pens)	Aris Voula
2025–26	Saronikos Anavyssou	3–0	Pallavreotikos

==== Notes ====
^{1} In the 2019–20 season, the competition was interrupted due to the COVID-19 pandemic. The final was decided by draw.
^{2} In the 2020–21 season, the competition, along with the local championships, was suspended due to a new outbreak of the COVID-19 pandemic and was later officially cancelled.

=== By club ===
Club	Titles	Winning years	Runners-up	Runner-up years	Final appearances
Keravnos Keratea	5	2004, 2005, 2006, 2008, 2013	0	–	5
Asteras Vari	2	2012, 2020	3	2004, 2011, 2023	5
Aris Voula	2	2019, 2022	1	2025	3
Saronikos Anavyssou	2	2024, 2026	0	–	2
Thyella Rafina	2	2015, 2018	0	–	2
Triglia Rafina	1	2016	4	2009, 2010, 2013, 2022	5
Acharnaikos	1	2023	2	2012, 2019	3
Aittitos Spata	1	2007	1	2017	2
Olympiakos Agios Stefanos	1	2014	1	2015	2
Pampaianiakos	1	2009	0	–	1
P.A.S. Oropos	1	2010	0	–	1
A.O. Koropi	1	2011	0	–	1
Atlantis Anthousas	1	2017	0	–	1
Marko	0	–	5	2006, 2007, 2018, 2020, 2024	5
A.O. Vouliagmeni	0	–	1	2005	1
Olympiakos Lavrio	0	–	1	2008	1
A.O. Kryoneriou	0	–	1	2014	1
A.P.O. Nikolakakis	0	–	1	2016	1
Pallavreotikos	0	–	1	2026	1

== Sources ==
- Greece – List of Regional Champions
