= Fotis Kezos =

Cypriot-Greek footballer

Personal information
- Full name: Fotios Kezos
- Date of birth: July 25, 1995 (age 31)
- Place of birth: Cyprus
- Height: 1.93 m (6 ft 4 in)
- Positions: Center back; defensive midfielder

Team information
- Current team: Spartakos Kitiou
- Number: 21

Youth career
- –2013: AEK Athens

Senior career*
Years	Team	Apps	(Gls)
2013–2014	AEK Athens	2	(0)
2014	Othellos Athienou	0	(0)
2015–2016	Nea Salamis	3	(0)
2016–2018	Ermis Aradippou	19	(0)
2018	Trikala	1	(0)
2019	Digenis Oroklinis	15	(0)
2019–2020	Aris Limassol	0	(0)
2020–2021	Digenis Morfou	26	(0)
2021–2022	ASIL Lysi	24	(1)
2022–2023	Ethnikos Achna	8	(0)
2023–2024	Ypsonas	12	(1)
2024–	Spartakos Kitiou	41	(2)

International career
	Cyprus U-17	3	
2012	Cyprus U-19	2	
- * Club domestic league appearances and goals as of 3 May 2026

Fotis Kezos (born July 25, 1995) is a Cypriot professional footballer who plays as a centre back for Spartakos Kitiou. He can also play as a defensive midfielder.

== Career ==
He started his career at AEK Athens academy, before graduating to the first team. He followed this up with spells at Othellos Athienou and Nea Salamis before joining Ermis Aradippou.

On 4 July 2017, Kezos joined Leeds United, where he would link up with former Ermis manager Carlos Corberán, who is the head coach of the under-23 side.

On 8 January 2019, Digenis Oroklinis announced the signing of Kezos. In September 2019, he signed with Aris Limassol FC.

== International career ==
Kezos has represented Cyprus U-17 and Cyprus U-19 at international level.

== Honours ==
AEK Athens

- Football League 2: 2013–14 (6th Group)
