= Edin Murga =

Bosnian footballer (born 1994)

Personal information
- Full name: Edin Murga
- Date of birth: 21 December 1994 (age 31)
- Place of birth: Vicenza, Italy
- Height: 1.83 m (6 ft 0 in)
- Position: Forward

Youth career
- –2012: Željezničar
- 2012–2013: Sarajevo

Senior career*
Years	Team	Apps	(Gls)
2013–2014	AEK Athens	5	(0)
2015	Vendsyssel	13	(1)
2015–2016	Birkirkara	0	(0)
2015–2016	→ Mosta (loan)	12	(5)
2016	Mladost Doboj Kakanj	0	(0)
2016	Mosta	3	(0)
2017	Bosna Union	11	(2)
2017	BV Essen	12	(7)
2018	Bosna Visoko	9	(2)
2018–2019	Tuzla City	20	(1)
2019	Mosta	8	(2)
2020	Zvijezda 09	1	(0)
2020–2021	GOŠK Gabela	3	(0)
2021–2022	FC Portalban/Gletterens	9	(2)
2022–2023	TOŠK Tešanj	6	(2)
- * Club domestic league appearances and goals as of 21:13, 17 January 2024 (UTC)

Edin Murga (born 21 December 1994) is a Bosnian professional footballer who plays as a centre-forward.

== Career ==
He joined GOŠK Gabela in September 2020. He left the club again in February 2021. Murga then joined Swiss 2. Liga Interregional club FC Portalban/Gletterens in July 2021.

== Career statistics ==
=== Club ===
As of 30 November 2021

Club	Season	League			Cup		Continental		Other		Total	
Club	Season	Division	Apps	Goals	Apps	Goals	Apps	Goals	Apps	Goals	Apps	Goals
AEK Athens	2013–14	Football League 2	5	0	0	0	—		—		5	0
Vendsyssel	2014–15	Danish 1st Division	13	1	0	0	—		—		13	1
Birkirkara	2015–16	Maltese Premier League	0	0	0	0	3	0	1	0	4	0
Mosta(loan)	2016	Maltese Premier League	12	5	0	0	0	0	1	0	13	5
Mladost Doboj Kakanj	2016–17	First League of FBiH	0	0	0	0	—		—		0	0
Mosta	2016–17	Maltese Premier League	3	0	0	0	0	0	0	0	3	0
Bosna Union	2016–17	First League of FBiH	11	2	2	1	—		—		13	3
BV Essen	2017	Landesliga Weser-Ems	12	7	0	0	—		—		12	7
Bosna Visoko	2017–18	First League of FBiH	9	2	0	0	—		—		9	2
Tuzla City	2018–19	Bosnian Premier League	20	1	1	0	—		—		21	1
Mosta	2019–20	Maltese Premier League	8	2	0	0	0	0	0	0	8	2
Zvijezda 09	2019–20	Bosnian Premier League	1	0	0	0	—		—		1	0
GOŠK Gabela	2020–21	First League of FBiH	3	0	0	0	—		—		3	0
FC Portalban/Gletteren	2021–22	2. Liga Interregional Group 2	9	2	0	0	—		—		9	2
TOŠK Tešanj	2022–23	First League of FBiH	6	2	1	0	—		—		7	2
Career total			112	24	4	1	3	0	2	0	121	25

== Honours ==
AEK Athens

- Football League 2: 2013–14 (6th Group)
