= Orestis Paliaroutas =

Greek footballer

Personal information
- Full name: Orestis Paliaroutas
- Date of birth: 6 August 1994 (age 32)
- Place of birth: Athens, Greece
- Height: 1.79 m (5 ft 10 in)
- Position: Left winger

Team information
- Current team: AO Anixis

Youth career
- A.E. Kifisia
- –2013: AEK Athens

Senior career*
Years	Team	Apps	(Gls)
2013–2015	AEK Athens	6	(0)
2014–2015	→ A.E. Kifisia (loan)	16	(0)
2015–2019	A.E. Kifisia		
2019–	AO Anixis	22	(0)
- * Club domestic league appearances and goals as of 2 February 2016, 00:39 (UTC)

Orestis Paliaroutas (Greek: Ορέστης Παληαρούτας; born 6 August 1994) is a Greek professional footballer who used to play as a left winger for AEK Athens. He works as an orthopaedic surgeon in KAT hospital, Athens.

== Honours ==
AEK Athens

- Football League 2: 2013–14 (6th Group)
