= Tryfon Kazviropoulos =

Greek footballer

Personal information
- Full name: Tryfon Kazviropoulos
- Date of birth: 21 September 1996 (age 30)
- Place of birth: Athens, Greece
- Height: 1.66 m (5 ft 5 in)
- Position: Left winger

Team information
- Current team: Thesprotos
- Number: 19

Youth career
- –2013: AEK Athens
- 2014: Hellas Verona
- 2015–2016: Panionios

Senior career*
Years	Team	Apps	(Gls)
2013–2014	AEK Athens	1	(0)
2016–2017	Panegialios	16	(0)
2017	Acharnaikos	2	(0)
2018	Sparta	6	(0)
2018–2019	Agioi Anargyroi	0	(0)
2019–2020	Kalamata	11	(1)
2020–	Thesprotos	7	(1)
- * Club domestic league appearances and goals as of 12 August 2020

Tryfon Kazviropoulos (Greek: Τρύφων Καζβιρόπουλος; born 21 September 1996) is a Greek professional footballer who plays as a left winger for Football League club Thesprotos.

== Honours ==
AEK Athens

- Football League 2: 2013–14 (6th Group)
