= Tasos Stasinos =

Greek footballer

Personal information
- Full name: Anastasios Stasinos
- Date of birth: 19 August 1985 (age 41)
- Place of birth: Aigaleo, Greece
- Height: 1.82 m (5 ft 11 1/2 in)
- Position: Right back

Youth career
- Aetos Korydalou

Senior career*
| Years | Team | Apps | (Gls) |
| 2005–2008 | Vyzas | 85 | (1) |
| 2009–2011 | Elpidoforos Kifisias | 74 | (5) |
| 2011–2014 | A.E. Kifisia | 66 | (0) |
| 2014–2018 | Ethnikos Piraeus | 75 | (1) |
- * Club domestic league appearances and goals

Tasos Stasinos (Greek: Τάσος Στασινός; born 19 August 1985) is a Greek footballer, who plays as a right back. Stasinos has started his professional career with Vyzas before he earns his transfer to Elpidoforos Kifisias in 2009. Stasinos remained a player for the team even after they merged with A.O. Kifisia to create A.E. Kifisia. In the season 2013/14 he was voted the best right back of Football League 2. After that he joined Ethnikos Piraeus for free.
