= Panagiotis Dounis =

Greek footballer

Personal information
- Date of birth: 23 March 1997 (age 29)
- Place of birth: Athens, Greece
- Height: 1.83 m (6 ft 0 in)
- Position: Goalkeeper

Team information
- Current team: Haidari

Youth career
- 2010–2012: Glyka Nera
- 2012–2013: AEK Athens

Senior career*
Years	Team	Apps	(Gls)
2013–2018	AEK Athens	1	(0)
2016–2017	→ Kallithea (loan)	5	(0)
2018–2019	Panegialios		
2019	AE Lefkimmi		
2019–2020	Panthiraikos		
2020–2022	Santorini		
2022–2024	Mykonos		
2024–2025	Haidari		
2025	Ethnikos Piraeus		
2025–	Haidari		

International career
2014	Greece U17	1	(0)
2014	Greece U18	4	(0)
- * Club domestic league appearances and goals as of 20:32, 8 May 2019 (UTC)

Panagiotis Dounis (Greek: Παναγιώτης Ντούνης; born 23 March 1997) is a Greek professional footballer who plays as a goalkeeper for Haidari.

== Club career ==
Panagiotis Dounis promoted to AEK Athens senior squad in 2013. He played 4 times in the semi-pro Football League 2. On 31 August 2016 he was loaned to Kallithea. He started the season as the team's first goalkeeper, but at the end of the season he was limited to just 5 appearances to the league and 3 to the Greek Cup.

In January 2019, he went on a trial at Doxa Drama, but did not receive a contract. He ended up signing with AE Lefkimmi instead on 26 January 2019. In the summer 2019, he then joined Panthiraikos.

== International career ==
Dounis is a regular member of Greece U-18 since 2014.

== Honours ==
AEK Athens

- Super League Greece: 2017–18
- Football League: 2014–15 (South Group)
- Football League 2: 2013–14 (6th Group)
- Greek Cup: 2015–16
