= Nikola Zivanović =

Serbian-Greek footballer

Personal information
- Full name: Nikola Zivanović
- Date of birth: 21 February 1996 (age 30)
- Position: Defensive midfielder

Team information
- Current team: AO Anixis

Youth career
- –2013: AEK Athens
- 2015–2016: Atromitos

Senior career*
Years	Team	Apps	(Gls)
2013–2015	AEK Athens	0	(0)
2014–2015	→ Anagennisi Ierapetra (loan)	4	(0)
2016	Jedinstvo Ub		
2016–2017	Olympiakos Laurium		
2017–2018	Proodeftiki		
2018–2019	AO Anixis	13	(5)
2019–2021	Pangytheiakos		
2021	Akratitos		
2021-	AO Anixis	13	(4)

International career
- Serbia U16
- * Club domestic league appearances and goals as of 00:39, 2 February 2016 (UTC)

Nikola Zivanović (born February 21, 1996) is a Serbian-Greek professional footballer who plays as a defensive midfielder for AO Anixis.

== Honours ==
AEK Athens

- Football League 2: 2013–14 (6th Group)
