= Spata Training Centre =

Training ground of AEK Athens in Spata, Greece

- Interactive map of Spata Training Centre
- Location: Spata, Attica
- Coordinates: 37.956634°N 23.9277037°E
- Owner: AEK Athens
- Type: Football training facility

Construction
- Opened: 2010
- Cost: €20 million

Tenant
- AEK Athens FC (training) (2010–present)

The Spata Training Centre (Greek: Προπονητικό Κέντρο Σπάτων) is the name given to AEK Athens' training complex, located in Spata near Spata International Airport. Also hosting the club's youth academy.

The facility replaced the old Thrakomakedones Training Centre, which was in use until 2010.

== History ==
The new architecturally designed AEK Training Centre has been built since 2010 and it is located in Spata, Attica. It is the home of the club's team and academy and is recognized as one of the best in the Balkans. The initial cost of its construction was 15 million euros. In 2013, the training center was modernized, with the creation of the most modern rehabilitation center in Greece and the construction of the 3rd plastic turf field for the needs of the Academies, the cost of which reached 5.5 million euros.

The modern facility - which includes two natural grass pitches, an artificial pitch, world-class player preparation areas, pool and hydrotherapy complex, altitude room, large-scale gymnasium and specialist sports rehabilitation suites - will support the club's ambitions to attract, develop and retain the highest quality talent.

Since 2014, the official name of the ground is "OPAP Sports Centre". Alongside the Sports Centre, Dimitris Melissanidis managed to buy another 70 acres of land at this area for a price of €5.5m, in order to enlarge team's Training Centre by constructing more football fields and buildings for the hospitality of team's footballers.

Since then, AEK has been using the said facilities on an area of 144 acres, within which the training center expands.

== Facilities ==
The training center has three football pitches, two of which meet the dimensional requirements of the International Association Football Federation (FIFA). The third of these was built three years later than the others, in 2013. Two of the three have natural turf and a drainage system.

In detail training center has:

- 2 natural grass football pitches

- Pitch 1: (105 x 68 metres)
- Pitch 2: (105 x 68 metres)

- 1 Fieldturf pitche (105 x 68 metres) with capacity for 280 spectators approximately
- 2 Αcademy facilities
- 1 Main building which includes:

- Offices
- 1 Gymnasium
- 1 Press Area
- 2 Multipurpose hall
- Rehabilitations rooms
- Dressing room
- Mini Pools
- Jacuzzi
- Spa
- Sauna
- Guest house

=== Serafidio Stadium ===
The last addition since April 2022 to AEK FC sports center was «Serafidio», the main field with stands, which was built to host the matches of AEK Athens B and also the friendly games of the first team. It got its name in memory of the legendary goalkeeper of AEK Stelios Serafidis. The construction of Serafidio is similar to Nikos Goumas Stadium, the old home of AEK, with many appearance similarities. The stadium has a capacity of 3000 seats with 2 separate stands on the east and the south side, while it is expected to be expanded by building another stand on the west side reaching the capacity of about 4000 to 5000 seats. It is of UEFA Level B standard, which means it can host up to a UEFA Youth League final.

== Expansion plans ==
In May 2023, the plan for the further expansion of the training center under the name AEK SportCity was officially announced, which foresees the construction of:

- 3rd stand at Serafideio
- x2 Parking
- x2 Academy Training Grounds
- Tennis court
- Swimming pool
- 5-star hotel with a total area of 5000 sq.m. which will consist of:

- Ground floor: Parking, AEK Shop, Gym, Play Room, Smart Room & Smart Technology, Outdoor cafe bar, central bar, Library, Restaurant, Lounge
- First floor: 24 rooms, 2 suites and a multi-purpose room
- Second floor: 20 rooms and 2 suites

The project is expected to be completed by the end of 2025
