= West Attica Football Clubs Association =

Association football governing body in West Attica Prefecture, Greece

- Full name: West Attica Football Clubs Association; Greek: Ένωση Ποδοσφαιρικών Σωματείων Δυτικής Αττικής
- Short name: West Attica F.C.A.; Greek: Ε.Π.Σ. Δυτικής Αττικής
- Founded: 2003; 23 years ago
- Headquarters: Elefsina, Greece
- FIFA affiliation: Hellenic Football Federation
- President: Klearchos Tzaferis
- Website: www.epsda.gr

West Attica Football Clubs Association (Greek: Ένωση Ποδοσφαιρικών Σωματείων Δυτικής Αττικής) is the governing body of association football in the regional unit of West Attica, Greece. Based in Elefsina, it is a member of the Hellenic Football Federation (HFF). It is responsible for organizing local league championships and the local Cup, as well as youth championships. It also coordinates the regional representative teams (Youth and Children), which compete at the national level.

== History ==
The West Attica Football Clubs Association was founded in 2003 and is the newest regional association in Greece. It was created by clubs previously affiliated with the Athens Football Clubs Association and the Piraeus Football Clubs Association located in towns and suburbs of West Attica.

== League ==
The champion of the EPS West Attica A Division promotes to the Gamma Ethniki. The structure of the West Attica FCA league system for the 2025–26 season is as follows:

- **A Division**: 14 Teams
- **B Division**: 16 Teams

=== Champions ===
Season	Champion
2003–04	Panelefsiniakos
2004–05	Aias Paralia Aspropyrgos
2005–06	A.G.S. Nea Peramos
2006–07	Aias Paralia Aspropyrgos
2007–08	Asteras Magoula
2008–09	Panelefsiniakos
2009–10	Aias Paralia Aspropyrgos
2010–11	Mandraikos
2011–12	Panelefsiniakos
2012–13	Attalos Nea Peramos
2013–14	Attalos Nea Peramos
2014–15	Akratitos
2015–16	DAO Zofria
2016–17	Enosi Aspropyrgos
2017–18	Mandraikos
2018–19	Akratitos
2019–20	Panelefsiniakos
2020–21	Abandoned
2021–22	Vyzas Megara
2022–23	Apollon Pontioi Aspropyrgos
2023–24	Mandraikos
2024–25	Enosi Aspropyrgos
2025–26	Asteras Magoula

=== Performance by club ===
Club	Titles	Season
Panelefsiniakos	4	2004, 2009, 2012, 2020
Aias Paralias Aspropyrgos	3	2005, 2007, 2010
Mandraikos	3	2011, 2018, 2024
Asteras Magoula	2	2008, 2026
Attalos Nea Peramos	2	2013, 2014
Akratitos	2	2015, 2019
Enosi Aspropyrgos	2	2017, 2025
A.G.S. Nea Peramos	1	2006
DAO Zofria	1	2016
Vyzas Megara	1	2022
Apollon Pontioi Aspropyrgos	1	2023

== Cup ==
Clubs belonging to the West Attica Football Clubs Association (West Attica FCA) participate in the Cup competition. The winner of the West Attica FCA Cup qualifies for the Greek Football Amateur Cup.

=== Winners ===
Season	Winner
2003–04	Enosi Aspropyrgos
2004–05	Enosi Aspropyrgos
2005–06	Mandraikos
2006–07	Enosi Aspropyrgos
2007–08	Enosi Aspropyrgos
2008–09	Enosi Aspropyrgos
2009–10	Panelefsiniakos
2010–11	Asteras Magoula
2011–12	Mandraikos
2012–13	Mandraikos
2013–14	Attalos Nea Peramos
2014–15	A.G.S. Nea Peramos
2015–16	Enosi Aspropyrgos
2016–17	Enosi Aspropyrgos
2017–18	Iraklis Elefsina
2018–19	Enosi Aspropyrgos
2019–20	Vyzas Megara
2020–21	Cancelled
2021–22	Panelefsiniakos
2022–23	Vyzas Megara
2023–24	Mandraikos
2024–25	Mandraikos
2025–26	Asteras Magoula

=== Performance by club ===
Club	Titles	Season
Enosi Aspropyrgos	8	2004, 2005, 2007, 2008, 2009, 2016, 2017, 2019
Mandraikos	5	2006, 2012, 2013, 2024, 2025
Panelefsiniakos	2	2010, 2022
Asteras Magoula	2	2011, 2026
Vyzas Megara	2	2020, 2023
Attalos Nea Peramos	1	2014
A.G.S. Nea Peramos	1	2015
Iraklis Elefsina	1	2018

== Teams in national divisions ==
One team participate in national divisions in the 2026–27 season :

- Gamma Ethniki:
  - Asteras Magoula
