= Andreas Vlachomitros =

Greek footballer

Personal information
- Date of birth: 3 July 1997 (age 29)
- Place of birth: Athens, Greece
- Height: 1.73 m (5 ft 8 in)
- Position: Left winger

Team information
- Current team: Aris Petroupolis

Youth career
- 2011–2016: AEK Athens

Senior career*
Years	Team	Apps	(Gls)
2013–2019	AEK Athens	2	(0)
2016	→ Javor Ivanjica (loan)	0	(0)
2018	→ Apollon Pontus (loan)	16	(1)
2018–2019	→ Sparta (loan)	11	(3)
2019	→ Aiginiakos (loan)	11	(1)
2019	Apollon Pontus	0	(0)
2019–2021	Ionikos	27	(5)
2021–2022	Niki Volos	26	(5)
2022–2023	Egaleo	24	(4)
2023–	Aris Petroupolis		
- * Club domestic league appearances and goals as of 16 June 2023

Andreas Vlachomitros (Greek: Ανδρέας Βλαχομήτρος; born 3 July 1997) is a Greek professional footballer who plays as a left winger for Gamma Ethniki club, Aris Petroupolis.

== Career ==
Born in the Greek capital Athens, Vlachomitros came from the youth ranks of AEK Athens where he scored over 60 goals in four years. He made his debut for the main team of AEK against Pannaxiakos on the last match day of 2013–14 Football League 2 season, scoring the final 3–1 score with a header.

Vlachomitros made his professional debut against Panionios at a UEFA playoff match in the last game of the 2015–16 season.

On July 7, 2016, Vlachomitros signed a one-year loan deal with Serbian SuperLiga side FK Javor Ivanjica. At the beginning of 2017, the deal was terminated and Vlachomitros returned to his home club without official caps for Javor.

== Personal life ==
Vlachomitros' younger brother, Anestis, is also a professional footballer.

== Honours ==
AEK Athens

- Football League 2: 2013–14 (6th Group)
- Greek Cup: 2015–16

Ionikos

- Super League Greece 2: 2020–21
