= Aspropyrgos F.C. =

Aspropyrgos
- Full name: Αθλητικός Όμιλος «Ασπρόπυργος» Athlitikos Omilos "Aspropyrgos" (Athletic Club "Aspropyrgos")
- Founded: 1995; 31 years ago
- Ground: Aspropyrgos Municipal Stadium
- Capacity: 2,000
- Chairman: Georgios Christofilopoulos
- Manager: Georgios Georgoulopoulos
- League: West Attica FCA Second Division
- 2025–26: West Attica FCA Second Division, 14th
- Website: aspropyrgosfc.gr
Home colours	Away colours

Athlitikos Omilos "Aspropyrgos", (Greek: Αθλητικός Όμιλος «Ασπρόπυργος», lit. 'Athletic Club "Aspropyrgos"'), is a Greek professional football club based in Aspropyrgos, Greece.

== History ==
The club was founded in 1995 with the merger of the older clubs "Panaspropyrgiakos A.O." (Greek: Πανασπροπυργιακός Α.Ο.) (founded in 1947 from the union of all of the city's teams and from 1951 participated in Piraeus FCA championships) and "A.O. Doxa Aspropyrgou" (Greek: Α.Ο. Δόξα Ασπροπύργου), with the name Enosi A.O. Panaspropyrgiakou – A.O. Doxa Aspropyrgou (Greek: Ένωση Α.Ο. Πανασπροπυργιακού – Α.Ο. Δόξα Ασπροπύργου).

In 2009, it was promoted to Gamma Ethniki. Enosis participated at Delta Ethniki in the 2008–09 season and finished in 1st place of 7th group before promoted to Football League 2.

Before the merger in the 1977-78 Greek football season, the team defeated Doxa Megalopoli 1–0 in a draw in the Greek Amateur Cup which was held in Tavros southwest of Athens.

== Honours ==
=== Domestic ===
- Gamma Ethniki: 1
  - 2018–19
- Delta Ethniki: 1
  - 2008–09
- West Attica FCA First Division: 2
  - 2016–17, 2024–25
- West Attica FCA Cup: 7
  - 2003–04, 2004–05, 2006–07, 2007–08, 2008–09, 2015–16, 2016–17
- Piraeus FCA First Division: 1
  - 2001–02
- Piraeus FCA Cup: 1
  - 1996–97
