= Triglia Rafinas F.C. =

Triglia Rafinas
- Full name: Athlitikos Omilos Triglias Rafinas (Triglia Rafinas A.C.)
- Nicknames: Ta Barbounia (The Barbounas); Oi Kitrinomavroi (The Blacks and yellows)
- Founded: 1931; 95 years ago
- Ground: Rafina Municipal Stadium
- Capacity: 1,000
- Owner: Members of Triglia Rafinas
- President: Marios Diangelakis
- Manager: Dimitrios Karagiorgas
- League: East Attica FCA Second Division
- 2025–26: East Attica FCA First Division, 15th (relegated)
- Website: http://www.aotriglia.gr/
Home colours	Away colours

Triglia Rafinas (Greek: Τριγλία Ραφήνας) is a Greek amateur association football club located in Rafina, Attica, Greece. It was founded in 1931 by a particular union of amateur clubs. The original symbol of the team was the barbouna or red Mullet (trigli). Its colors are black and yellow, which are the colors of the Byzantine flag. Today, the club keeps its colors, but the symbol has been changed to a two-headed eagle, the Byzantine symbol.

== History ==
=== Foundation and first years ===
The founders of the team were Anastasios Lyrantzis, Stellios Tseropoulos, Dimitrios, Rigas and Vasillis Voudouris. They originated the idea of uniting many local, unofficial athletic clubs like Vyzantio and Propontida, which were founded by teenagers or children. The founders of Triglia delegated a lawyer to write the statute for the foundation of one team with the name Athletic Football Union Triglia Rafinas (Greek: Αθλητική Ποδοσφαιρική Ένωσις Τριγλία Ραφήνας). Its first colors were black and white and first symbol the red mullet (trigli). Later, the symbol changed to a two-headed eagle, the Byzantine symbol. The first management board was composed of Anastasios Lyrantzis (president), Kyriakos Drakoulis (vice president), Stellios Tseropoulos (secretary), Vasilis Voudouris (general leader) and Dimitrios and Rigas (efors).

In 1934 the Union of Football Clubs in Athens (Ε.Π.Σ.Α) was founded, and Triglia Rafinas was one of its founding members.

=== The "black page" of 1935–36 ===
Between 1935 and 1936 Triglia ceased activities because of a leadership crisis and the lack of a field. At this time, many people exploited it and created a new team with the name "Panrafinaikos", but it never had a statute or fans and was soon dissolved.

In 1936, Triglia was reorganized, but the site of its old field had been taken for another use. Therefore, the field was moved to its present location. However, the new site was full of sand and other types of rubbish. Therefore, the Triglia fans repeatedly went over the site using their horses and plows, trying to make it level. After 1957, a fence was built around the field.

=== During the German-Italian occupation ===
At the time of the German and Italian occupation of Greece, sports events were limited. However, some young people who had played for Triglia asked the Italian commander to allow them to set up a football team, to play some friendly matches against the teams of the occupation forces. The commander agreed, but he imposed one condition. "In your office, you will talk only about sports", he said. The people of Triglia ignored this command for two years, however. Members of the National Liberation Front (Greek: Εθνικό Απελευθερωτικό Μέτωπο) hid and met in the team's offices. The team operated in this way until 1944, when the occupation forces left Greece.

=== During the years after the war - the first titles ===
In the years which followed the Second World War people who did not approve of the name "Triglia" tried to create other teams to replace Triglia Rafinas, such as Mikrasiatiki and Panrafinaikos. These teams never had fans and they were dissolved. In this period the team's name was changed to Athletic Club Triglia Rafinas.

Triglia Rafinas competed for E.P.S.A's championships and cups, with many successes. Specifically, the first title Triglia won was the championship of Gamma E.P.S.A. (1964), and it was promoted to Beta E.P.S.A., which it won in 1965, winning the promotion to Alpha E.P.S.A. Four years later, they won the championship of Alpha E.P.S.A. and were promoted to National Categories. However, the dictatorship relegated the team to Gamma E.P.S.A. The team from Rafina returned to Beta E.P.S.A. by winning the championship of Gamma E.P.S.A. in 1969 and in 1971 they won the championship of Beta E.P.S.A., but in 1972, in Alpha E.P.S.A., they were beaten by Liosia, losing the promotion to Beta Ethniki.

In 1988, AC Triglia Rafinas became the champion of Alpha E.P.S.A. for the second time in its history, but in the same year they lost against Pefki in the final of the E.P.S.A cup by a score of 5–3 (penalty), at the Leoforos Alexandras Stadium.

From 1988 to 1989, Triglia took part in the championship of Delta Ethniki.

=== 1988–2010 - the great promotion to Delta Ethniki ===
In the evolution of Athens FCA, East Attica FCA, Triglia, under the coaching of Stathis Aslanoglou, who became Triglia's coach in 2007, took part in the final of the East Attica FCA cup in 2009 in Spata's Stadium, where they lost on penalties to Pampaianikos, by a score of 1–1 (regular time) and 4–2 (penalties), winning the second place.

The next year they became the champions of East Attica FCA First Division, and were promoted to Delta Ethniki. The same year, 2010, Triglia qualified for the cup final, in Pallini's stadium, losing by a score of 1–2 to Oropos, ranking in second place for the second time.

=== Since 2011 ===
In the 2010–2011 season, AC Triglia Rafinas ranked in second place among the teams of the 9th Group of Delta Ethniki, behind Proodeftiki. Also in the 2011–2012 season, Triglia won its stay to the category, by winning the historical Ethnikos Piraeus F.C. in the last match of the tournament. The remarkable thing is that this defeat meant the demotion of Ethnikos to the local championships for the first time. Also, there were some cases of violence after the end of the match by 100 of Ethnikos' fans.

In 2012 and 2013 Triglia was promoted to the new amateur category, Football League 2, which was merged with Delta Ethniki, and became amateur. Triglia confirmed their promotion by beating Keratsini with a score of 4–0, at the last match but one of the 9th group.

Following its promotion to Gamma Ethniki, Triglia Rafina made its debut in the national category during the 2013–14 season, achieving a respectable 4th-place finish in Group 6, which featured historical and competitive clubs such as AEK Athens, Egaleo, and Irodotos. In contrast, the following 2014–15 season saw the team finish 4 places lower, occupying 8th place in Group 4. During the 2015–16 season, the club finished in 3rd place—its highest ever position—in Group 4, comfortably securing its status in Gamma Ethniki for a third consecutive year. In the 2016–17 season, it finished in 8th place in Group 4, and in the 2017–18 season, it finished in 10th place in Group 7, suffering relegation after 5 consecutive seasons in Gamma Ethniki.

During the 2025–26 season, Triglia wrote a dark page in its history as it was relegated for the first time to the Second Division of the East Attica FCA.

== Honours ==
=== Domestic ===
- Athens FCA Champions: 2
  - 1968–69, 1987–88
- East Attica FCA Champions: 1
  - 2009–10
- East Attica FCA Cup Winners: 1
  - 2015–16
