= Asteras Magoula F.C. =

Association football club in Greece

Asteras Magoula
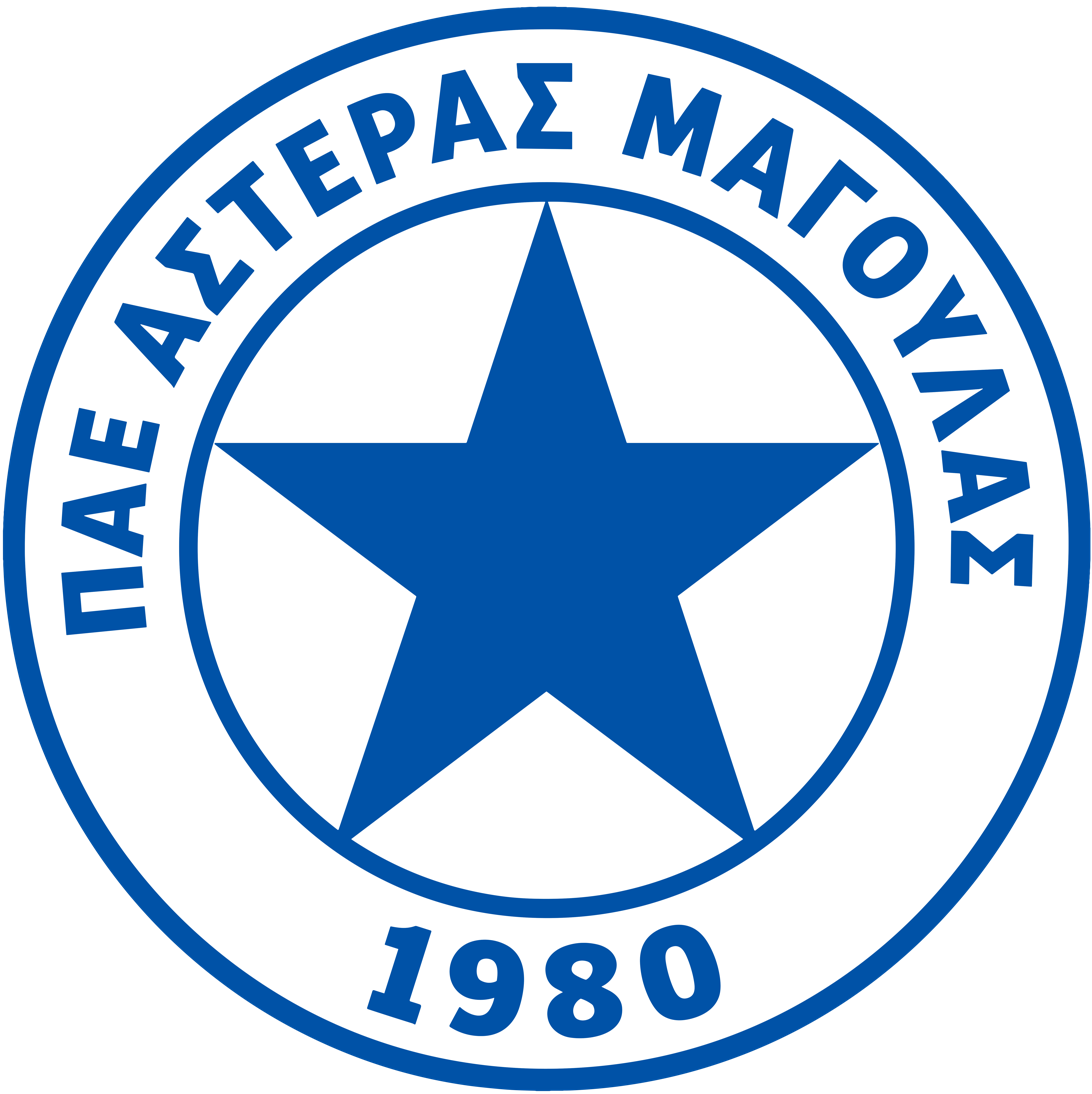
- Full name: Asteras Magoula Football Club
- Founded: 1980; 46 years ago
- Ground: Municipal Stadium of Magoula
- Capacity: 800
- Chairman: Ioannis Vougiantzis
- Manager: Georgios Paraskevaidis
- League: Gamma Ethniki
- 2025–26: West Attica FCA First Division, 1st (promoted)
Home colours	Away colours	Third colours

Asteras Magoula Football Club (Greek: Α.Ο. Αστέρας Μαγούλας) is a Greek football club, based in Magoula, West Attica. It was officially founded in 1980.

Asteras spent the majority of its history in the Piraeus Football Clubs Association championships until 2003, when it joined the newly formed West Attica Football Clubs Association. On 25 June 2011, Asteras won the Greek Amateur Cup after beating Asteras Lianokladi 2–0. The same year, it was promoted to Football League 2 after finishing first in Group 7 of the 2010–11 Delta Ethniki.

== Honours ==
=== National ===
- Delta Ethniki
  - Winners (1): 2010–11
- Greek Amateur Cup
  - Winners (1): 2010–11

=== Regional ===
- West Attica FCA First Division
  - Winners (2): 2007–08, 2025–26
- West Attica FCA Cup
  - Winners (2): 2010–11, 2025–26
