= Kyanos Asteras Vari F.C. =

Kyanos Asteras Vari
- Full name: Athlitikos Omilos Kyanos Asteras Vari
- Founded: 21 May 1964; 62 years ago
- Ground: Vari Municipal Stadium
- Capacity: 2,500
- Chairman: Andreas Antartis
- Manager: Nikos Mesolongis
- League: Gamma Ethniki
- 2025–26: Gamma Ethniki (Group 6), 3rd
- Website: www.asterasvaris.gr
Home colours	Away colours

Kyanos Asteras Vari Football Club (Greek: Κυανούς Αστέρας Βάρης) is a Greek football club, based in Vari, Athens. It was founded in 1964 and competes in Gamma Ethniki.

== History ==
=== Foundation ===
The club was founded on 21 May 1964. Initially, the association remained inactive. Local youth practiced on an open field converted into a pitch at the site where the schools of Vari stand today. In 1966, Ioannis Katsikis and Panagiotis Antoniou discovered them there and effectively activated the club. The team then moved to the area in front of present-day Georgiadis Bakery; however, heavy rainfall frequently flooded the pitch, turning it into a lake. As a result, the team relocated once again to the site where the Varkiza Nautical Club stands today. The team was hosted in Voula for training sessions, while playing matches in Voula and Koropi.

In 1984, funded by the municipality under Mayor Konstantinos Baglatzis and with the significant assistance of Grigoris Blatsoukas, a stadium was constructed along the boundary of the present-day beach area in Varkiza, which opened for use in 1989. The team remained at that site until 2004, when it moved to the present "Konstantinos Baglatzis" Municipal Stadium of Vari, which was originally constructed as an Olympic training venue for the 2004 Summer Olympics in Athens.

=== Competitive history ===
The club began its official competitive course in the championships of the Athens FCA, starting from the Third Division. In 1973, it won the Group 2 title by defeating A.O. Paradeisos Marousi 2–1 in a tiebreaker play-off match at the neutral Tavros Municipal Stadium after finishing level on points, earning promotion to the B' Division. In 1980, it secured promotion to the Athens FCA A' Division, competing in the top tier of the Athens FCA for the first time in the 1980–81 season. In subsequent years, the club continued competing in the Athens FCA leagues until the founding of the East Attica FCA, joining its ranks and competing in its competitions ever since.

During the 2010–11 season, the club won the East Attica FCA championship for the first time and gained promotion to Delta Ethniki. It made its first appearance in Delta Ethniki during the 2011–12 season, and in the following 2012–13 season, it achieved historic promotion to Gamma Ethniki. The team competed in Gamma Ethniki from the 2013–14 season until the 2015–16 season, when it was relegated. In the 2019–20 season, it was crowned undefeated champion of the East Attica FCA once again, securing promotion back to Gamma Ethniki, where it competed during the 2020–21 and 2021–22 seasons.

It has won the East Attica FCA Cup twice, in 2012 and 2020. It was crowned champion once again in 2023 and achieved promotion to Gamma Ethniki for yet another time through the FCA Champions Play-offs, once more under the leadership of its iconic figure, Dimitris Papios.

During the 2024–25 season, Kyanos Asteras Vari won the East Attica FCA Cup for the 3rd time, following the 21st final held tonight at the Markopoulo Municipal Stadium against Aris Voula. Regular time ended 1–1 and extra time finished 2–2, with Asteras Vari ultimately prevailing 4–1 on penalties.

== Stadium ==
Kyanos Asteras Vari uses the Konstantinos Baglatzis Vari Municipal Athletic Center as its home venue, featuring an artificial turf pitch. The stand has a capacity of 2,500 spectators.

== Honours ==
=== Regional ===
- East Attica FCA First Division
  - Winners (3): 2009–10, 2019–20, 2022–23
- East Attica FCA Cup
  - Winners (3): 2010–11, 2019–20, 2024–25
