= Mandraikos F.C. =

Mandraikos
- Full name: Mandraikos Athlitikos Omilos
- Nickname: Κυανόλευκοι (The Blue-whites)
- Founded: 1956; 70 years ago
- Ground: Municipal Mandra Stadium "Frageio"
- Capacity: 3,000
- Chairman: Konstantinos Karliampas
- Manager: Michalis Katsafaros
- League: West Attica FCA First Division
- 2025–26: West Attica FCA First Division, 3rd
Home colours	Away colours	Third colours

Mandraikos Football Club is a Greek football club based in Mandra, Attica.

The club was founded in 1956. They played in Gamma Ethniki for the season 2024–25.

== History ==
The Mandraikos F.C. officially founded in 1956 and originally belonged to Piraeus Football Clubs Association. Already existed from 1931 as Mandraikos and for two seasons (1953–1955) as Panmandraikos. First time played in Delta Ethniki in 1985–86 season. In 2005 change football association and is now part of West Attica Football Clubs Association.
