= 2012–13 AEK Athens F.C. season =

AEK Athens
2012–13 season
- Chairman: Thomas Mavros (until 4 October); Andreas Dimitrelos (until 7 June); Konstantinos Kotsatos
- Manager: Vangelis Vlachos (until 30 September); Manolis Papadopoulos (interim, until 9 October); Ewald Lienen (until 9 April); Traianos Dellas
- Stadium: Athens Olympic Stadium
- Super League: 15th (Relegated)
- Greek Cup: Round of 32
- Top goalscorer: League: Taxiarchis Fountas (4); All: Taxiarchis Fountas (4)
- Highest home attendance: 22,587 (vs Panthrakikos) (14 April 2013)
- Lowest home attendance: 300 (vs Kavala) (20 December 2012)
- Average home league attendance: 10,602
- Biggest win: Veria 0–4 AEK Athens
- Biggest defeat: AEK Athens 0–4 Olympiacos
Home colours	Away colours	Third colours

The 2012–13 season was the 89th season in the existence of AEK Athens F.C. and the 54th consecutive season in the top flight of Greek football. They competed in the Super League and the Greek Cup. The season began on 25 August 2012 and finished on 21 April 2013.

== Kits ==
Supplier: Puma
Sponsor(s): Kino
Features: Diners Club, International Service Oil

Home	Away	Third

== Overview ==
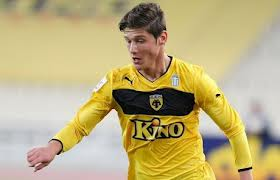
Anastasios Tsoumagas

AEK, on the verge of dissolution, started the season without even the team's preparation being self-evident. The financial crisis had hit AEK for good and in combination with the abandonment of the team by the shareholders, created a heated atmosphere within the club. From the summer it was obvious that the team would fight for their stay in the first division, a tragic fact because AEK by nature could not handle that kind of circumstances. AEK terminated the contracts of most of their players and sold some of them at bargain prices in order to save money, while they acquired low-quality and young footballers who were unable to carry the burden of the size of the club. In the midst of this situation, the team naturally did not receive a license for their participation in Europa League. The assumption of the presidency by the old legend of the club, Thomas Mavros, managed to rally a significant part of the world of the group around it. Mavros hired another former AEK player for the position of coach, Vangelis Vlachos. The position of technical director was taken over by Vasilios Tsiartas, who only managed to bring Miguel Cordero, whο was the most successful transfer of the team.

In the Championship, AEK started with defeats with the crowd showing the support to the team. The situation continued, resulting in the removal of Vlachos, a decision that also led to the resignation of Mavros from the presidency of AEK. Andreas Dimitrelos returned to the presidency of the team with the German Ewald Lienen being hired as the coach. It took October 28 for AEK to score their first victory of the season. In the cup, AEK were drawn against Kavala, who at the time were competing in the second division and after the away 0–0, they were eliminated, losing ny 0–1 at the Olympic Stadium. In the winter having only 3 wins, the team were strengthened with Antonis Petropoulos, Pavlos Mitropoulos, Anastasios Tsoumagas and Dimitrios Anakoglou and carried on with the hope that they could save the season. After a 6 match unbeaten streak, AEK regained their hopes and believed that their dignity would be saved and the team would avoid relegation. On 16 March, in another crucial match, AEK beat Veria with a redemption goal by Georgios Katidis in the last minutes of the match, but instead of celebrating, the scorer gave a Nazi salute to the people of the team, resulting in his punishment with exclusion, both from AEK and for the Greek national teams. During that period, the conditions began to shape up perfectly in order for the team to be relegated. After an embarrassing defeat in Ioannina, Lienen resigned, with the former defender of the club, Traianos Dellas taking his place, while at the same time AEK's rivals for the stay suddenly transformed competitively and started to bring positive results. As things were set, AEK wanted 3 points to save themselves in the last 2 matches, with Panthrakikos at home and with Atromitos away from home. The match against the Thracians gathered a lot of crowd, who went to support their team in a "final" for the stay, in a match dominated by anxiety and nervousness on the field, with AEK being harmless and fearless, while as time passed, Panthrakikos continuously gained ground and 10 minutes before the end, Bougaidis scored an own goal, resulting in the invasion of the yellow and black ultras on the pitch, who stormed against everyone and looted the stadium. From that moment on, it was all over for AEK, since they lost the match on paper with 0–3, while a 3-point deduction was imposed on them from the championship. AEK then desperately appealed to sports justice to exhaust any chance of having the points returned to them, so that they could have a mathematical hope of avoiding relegation with a win in the last match. In Peristeri Stadium, AEK, conceding a goal in the last minute of the game, were relegated for the first time in their glorious history, spreading sadness to their millions of fans across the globe.

== Management team ==
Position	Staff
Manager	(Greece) Traianos Dellas
Assistant manager	(Greece) Akis Zikos
Assistant manager	(Greece) Vasilios Borbokis
Goalkeeping coach	(Greece) Kostas Kampolis
Fitness coach	(Greece) Spyros Toutziarakis
Academy director	(Greece) Andreas Stamatiadis
U20 Manager	(Greece) Daniel Batista
U17 Manager	(Greece) Charis Kopitsis
Head of Scouting	(Greece) Spyros Toutziarakis
Head of Medical	(Greece) Lakis Nikolaou

== Players ==
=== Squad information ===
NOTE: The players are the ones that have been announced by the AEK Athens' press release. No edits should be made unless a player arrival or exit is announced. Updated 21 April 2013, 23:59 UTC+3.

No.	Player	Nat.	Position(s)	Date of birth (Age)	Signed	Previous club	Transfer fee	Contract until
Goalkeepers
1	Dimitrios Konstantopoulos (Vice-captain 2)	(Greece)	GK	29 November 1978 (aged 34)	2011	(Greece) Kerkyra	€75,000	2013
28	Theodoros Moschonas	(Greece)	GK	3 December 1990 (aged 22)	2009	(Greece) AEK Athens U20	—	2013
89	Ilias Makryonitis	(Greece)	GK	10 April 1989 (aged 24)	2012	(Greece) PAO Rouf	Free	2016
99	Giannis Arabatzis (Vice-captain 3)	(Greece)	GK	28 May 1984 (aged 29)	2002	(Greece) Enosi Apostolou Pavlou	€22,000	2013
Defenders
3	Yago Fernández	(Portugal)	CB / DM	3 January 1988 (aged 25)	2012	(Spain) Girona	Free	2015
18	Konstantinos Nikolopoulos	(Greece)	LB / LM	30 November 1993 (aged 19)	2012	(Greece) Paniliakos	Free	2016
24	Konstantinos Vlachos	(Greece)	CB	6 February 1995 (aged 18)	2012	(Greece) AEK Athens U20	—	2015
34	Anastasios Tsoumagas	(Greece)	LB / LM	22 March 1991 (aged 22)	2013	(Portugal) Leixões	Free	2015
37	Valentinos Vlachos	(Greece) (New Zealand)	RB / RM	14 February 1992 (aged 21)	2012	(Greece) Kavala	Free	2015
47	Mavroudis Bougaidis	(Greece)	CB / LB	1 June 1993 (aged 20)	2011	(Greece) Aris	Free	2014
77	Christos Arkoudas	(Greece)	RB / LB / RM	13 June 1990 (aged 23)	2012	(Greece) Kallithea	Free	2016
81	Konstantinos Tsoupros	(Greece)	CB	20 July 1991 (aged 21)	2012	(Greece) Asteras Magoula	Free	2016
91	Georgios Koutroumpis	(Greece)	CB / DM	10 February 1991 (aged 22)	2012	(Greece) Kallithea	€35,000	2016
92	Sokratis Tsoukalas	(Greece)	RB / LB	7 July 1992 (aged 20)	2011	(Italy) Palermo	Free	2014
Midfielders
6	Miguel Cordero	(Spain)	CM / DM	10 September 1987 (aged 25)	2012	(Spain) Xerez	€70,000	2014
8	Georgios Katidis	(Greece)	AM / RM / LM / CM / RW / LW	12 February 1993 (aged 20)	2012	(Greece) Aris	€100,000	2016
10	Roger Guerreiro (Vice-captain)	(Poland) (Brazil)	AM / CM / LM / LW / SS	25 May 1982 (aged 31)	2009	(Poland) Legia Warsaw	€250,000	2013
13	Antonis Rikka (Captain)	(Greece) (France)	DM / CM	3 March 1986 (aged 27)	2008	(Greece) Skoda Xanthi	€600,000	2013
21	Taxiarchis Fountas	(Greece)	AM / SS / ST / RM / LM / CM / RW / LW	4 September 1995 (aged 17)	2011	(Greece) AEK Athens U20	Free	2014
23	Xenofon Fetsis	(Greece)	DM / CM / CB	5 May 1991 (aged 22)	2011	(Greece) Panathinaikos	Free	2013
30	Joseph Agyriba	(Ghana) (France)	DM / CB / CM	12 February 1989 (aged 24)	2010	(Italy) Benevento	Free	2014
32	Enias Kalogeris	(Greece) (Albania)	RM / RW	9 October 1990 (aged 22)	2012	(Greece) AEK Athens U20	—	2016
39	Dimitrios Anastasopoulos	(Greece)	CM / DM / AM	11 April 1990 (aged 23)	2013	(Greece) Kavala	Free	2015
44	Dimitrios Anakoglou	(Greece)	AM / CM / RM / LM	6 September 1991 (aged 21)	2013	(Greece) Panserraikos	€50,000	2016
63	Christos Papadimitriou	(Greece)	LM / LW / LB / RM	10 January 1994 (aged 19)	2012	(Greece) AEK Athens U20	—	2016
66	Alexandros Nikolias	(Greece)	CM / AM / RM / LM	23 July 1994 (aged 18)	2012	(Greece) AEK Athens U20	—	2016
80	Dimitrios Grontis	(Greece)	CM / AM / LM / RM / LW / RW	21 August 1994 (aged 18)	2012	(Greece) AEK Athens U20	—	2016
82	Pavlos Mitropoulos	(Greece)	DM / CM	4 April 1990 (aged 23)	2012	(Greece) Panionios	Free	2013
88	Nikos Kourellas	(Greece)	LM / LW / LB	22 May 1993 (aged 20)	2012	(Greece) Aris	Free	2016
—	Georgios Aresti	(Cyprus)	CM / DM	2 September 1994 (aged 18)	2012	(Greece) AEK Athens U20	—	2016
Forwards
7	Nikolaos Katsikokeris	(Greece)	ST / RW	19 June 1988 (aged 25)	2012	(Greece) Ergotelis	€150,000	2015
9	Thomas Tsitas	(Greece)	ST	30 July 1991 (aged 21)	2011	(Greece) Iraklis	Free	2014
11	Michalis Pavlis	(Greece)	SS / ST / RW / LW	22 September 1989 (aged 23)	2012	(Greece) Kavala	Free	2013
14	Andreas Stamatis	(Greece)	ST / RW	12 May 1993 (aged 20)	2012	(Greece) Panionios	Free	2016
20	José Furtado	(Cape Verde) (Portugal)	ST / SS	14 March 1983 (aged 30)	2012	(Greece) Panachaiki	€60,000	2014
33	Antonis Petropoulos	(Greece)	ST	28 January 1986 (aged 27)	2012	(Greece) Panathinaikos	Free	2014
70	Giannis Karalis	(Greece)	RW / LW / SS / ST / AM	6 November 1988 (aged 24)	2013	(Greece) Kerkyra	Free	2015
Left during Winter Transfer Window
2	Giannis Kontoes	(Greece)	CB / RB / LB / DM	24 May 1986 (aged 27)	2011	(Greece) Panionios	Free	2014
22	Michalis Tsamourlidis	(Greece) (Georgia (country))	LB	22 March 1992 (aged 21)	2012	(Greece) Glyfada	Free	2016
12	Konstantinos Kotsaridis	(Greece)	DM / CM / LB	12 June 1992 (aged 21)	2012	(Greece) Olympiacos U20	Free	2015
19	Panagiotis Lagos	(Greece)	LM / LW / LB / CM / DM	18 July 1985 (aged 27)	2006	(Greece) Iraklis	€900,000	2013

== Transfers ==
=== In ===
==== Summer ====
No.	Pos.	Player	From	Fee	Date	Contract Until	Source
3	DF	(Portugal) Yago Fernández	(Spain) Girona	Free transfer	17 August 2012	30 June 2015	
6	MF	(Spain) Miguel Cordero	(Spain) Xerez	€70,000	27 August 2012	30 June 2014	
7	FW	(Greece) Nikolaos Katsikokeris	(Greece) Ergotelis	€150,000	26 August 2012	30 June 2015	
8	MF	(Greece) Georgios Katidis	(Greece) Aris	€100,000^{[a]}	28 August 2012	30 June 2016	
11	FW	(Greece) Michalis Pavlis	(Greece) Kavala	Free transfer	21 August 2012	30 June 2013	
12	MF	(Greece) Konstantinos Kotsaridis	(Greece) Olympiacos U20	Free transfer	1 July 2012	30 June 2015	
14	FW	(Greece) Andreas Stamatis	(Greece) Panionios	Free transfer	15 July 2012	30 June 2016	
18	DF	(Greece) Konstantinos Nikolopoulos	(Greece) Paniliakos	Free transfer	18 August 2012	30 June 2016	
20	FW	(Cape Verde) José Furtado	(Greece) Panachaiki	€60,000	6 August 2012	30 June 2014	
22	DF	(Greece) Michalis Tsamourlidis	(Greece) Glyfada	Free transfer	1 July 2012	30 June 2016	
23	MF	(Greece) Xenofon Fetsis	(Greece) Glyfada	Loan return	1 July 2012	30 June 2013	
24	DF	(Greece) Konstantinos Vlachos	(Greece) AEK Athens U20	Promotion	1 July 2012	30 June 2015	
30	MF	(Ghana) Joseph Agyriba	(Greece) Glyfada	Loan return	1 July 2012	30 June 2014	
32	MF	(Greece) Enias Kalogeris	(Greece) AEK Athens U20	Promotion	1 July 2012	30 June 2016	
37	DF	(Greece) Valentinos Vlachos	(Greece) Thrasyvoulos	Loan return	1 July 2012	30 June 2015	
63	MF	(Greece) Christos Papadimitriou	(Greece) AEK Athens U20	Promotion	20 August 2012	30 June 2016	
66	MF	(Greece) Alexandros Nikolias	(Greece) AEK Athens U20	Promotion	20 August 2012	30 June 2016	
77	DF	(Greece) Christos Arkoudas	(Greece) Kallithea	Free transfer	17 July 2012	30 June 2016	
80	MF	(Greece) Dimitris Grontis	(Greece) AEK Athens U20	Promotion	1 July 2012	30 June 2016	
81	DF	(Greece) Konstantinos Tsoupros	(Greece) Asteras Magoula	Free transfer	13 August 2012	30 June 2016	
88	MF	(Greece) Nikos Kourellas	(Greece) Aris	Free transfer	23 August 2012	30 June 2016	
89	GK	(Greece) Ilias Makryonitis	(Greece) PAO Rouf	Free transfer	22 August 2012	30 June 2016	
91	DF	(Greece) Georgios Koutroumpis	(Greece) Kallithea	€35,000	9 August 2012	30 June 2016	
92	DF	(Greece) Sokratis Tsoukalas	(Greece) Apollon Smyrnis	Loan return	1 July 2012	30 June 2014	
—	DF	(Greece) Spyros Matentzidis	(Greece) Diagoras	Loan return	1 July 2012	30 June 2014	
—	DF	(Greece) Stamatis Kalamiotis	(Greece) Thrasyvoulos	Loan return	1 July 2012	30 June 2012	
—	MF	(Cyprus) Georgios Aresti	(Greece) AEK Athens U20	Promotion	1 July 2012	30 June 2016	
—	FW	(Greece) Giorgos Nikoltsis	(Greece) Fokikos	Loan return	1 July 2012	30 June 2012	

==== Winter ====
No.	Pos.	Player	From	Fee	Date	Contract Until	Source
33	FW	(Greece) Antonis Petropoulos	(Greece) Panathinaikos	Free transfer	20 December 2012	30 June 2014	
34	DF	(Greece) Anastasios Tsoumagas	(Portugal) Leixões	Free transfer	4 January 2013	30 June 2015	
39	MF	(Greece) Dimitrios Anastasopoulos	(Greece) Kavala	Free transfer	31 January 2013	30 June 2015	
44	MF	(Greece) Dimitrios Anakoglou	(Greece) Panserraikos	€50,000	31 January 2013	30 June 2016	
70	FW	(Greece) Giannis Karalis	(Greece) Kerkyra	Free transfer	7 January 2013	30 June 2015	
—	MF	(Greece) Iraklis Garoufalias	(Greece) AEK Athens U20	Promotion	31 December 2012	30 June 2016	
—	MF	(Cyprus) Georgios Aresti	(Greece) Glyfada	Loan termination	7 January 2013	30 June 2016	

=== Out ===
==== Summer ====
No.	Pos.	Player	To	Fee	Date	Source
1	MF	(Greece) Pantelis Kafes	(Greece) Veria	End of contract	31 August 2012	
3	DF	(Iceland) Elfar Freyr Helgason	(Norway) Stabæk	Contract termination	24 July 2012	
4	DF	(Greece) Kostas Manolas	(Greece) Olympiacos	End of contract	3 July 2012	
5	DF	(Greece) Traianos Dellas	Retired		30 June 2012	
8	FW	(Cameroon) Steve Leo Beleck	(Italy) Udinese Calcio	Loan return	1 July 2012	
9	FW	(Brazil) Leonardo	(South Korea) Jeonbuk Hyundai Motors	€850,000	19 July 2012	
10	MF	(Spain) José Carlos	(Spain) Rayo Vallecano	End of contract	5 July 2012	
11	FW	(Greece) Dimitris Sialmas	(Azerbaijan) Khazar Lankaran	Contract termination	24 August 2012	
14	MF	(Greece) Grigoris Makos	(Germany) 1860 Munich	€300,000^{[b]}	9 July 2012	
15	DF	(Greece) Nikolaos Karabelas	(Spain) Levante	Contract termination	26 July 2012	
16	DF	(Greece) Anestis Argyriou	(Scotland) Rangers	Contract termination	25 August 2012	
17	MF	(Australia) Paul Katsetis	(Italy) Catania U19	Contract termination	31 August 2012	
21	MF	(Colombia) Fabián Vargas	(Spain) Independiente	Contract termination	23 July 2012	
22	FW	(Iceland) Eiður Guðjohnsen	(Belgium) Cercle Brugge	Contract termination	10 October 2012	
31	DF	(Greece) Nikolaos Georgeas	(Greece) Veria	End of contract	18 July 2012	
33	FW	(Greece) Nikos Liberopoulos	Retired		30 June 2012	
77	FW	(Belgium) Victor Klonaridis	(France) Lille	€800,000^{[c]}	2 July 2012	
93	FW	(Cyprus) Dimitris Froxylias	Free agent	Contract termination	30 August 2012	
—	DF	(Greece) Stamatis Kalamiotis	(Greece) Thrasyvoulos	Contract termination	3 September 2012	
—	FW	(Greece) Giorgos Nikoltsis	(Greece) Glyfada	Contract termination	29 August 2012	

==== Winter ====
No.	Pos.	Player	To	Fee	Date	Source
2	DF	(Greece) Giannis Kontoes	(Greece) Asteras Tripolis	Contract termination	30 January 2013	
12	MF	(Greece) Konstantinos Kotsaridis	(Greece) Aris	Contract termination	25 January 2013	
19	MF	(Greece) Panagiotis Lagos	(Ukraine) Vorskla Poltava	Contract termination	29 January 2013	

=== Loan in ===
==== Winter ====
No.	Pos.	Player	From	Fee	Date	Until	Option to buy	Source
82	MF	(Greece) Pavlos Mitropoulos	(Greece) Panetolikos	Free	17 December 2012	30 June 2013	✓	

=== Loan out ===
==== Summer ====
No.	Pos.	Player	To	Fee	Date	Until	Option to buy	Source
66	DF	(Cyprus) Nikos Englezou	(Cyprus) Nea Salamis Famagusta	Free	12 July 2012	30 June 2013	✗	
—	DF	(Greece) Spyros Matentzidis	(Greece) Korinthos	Free	29 August 2012	30 June 2013	✗	
—	MF	(Cyprus) Georgios Aresti	(Greece) Glyfada	Free	29 August 2012	30 June 2013	✗	

==== Winter ====
No.	Pos.	Player	To	Fee	Date	Until	Option to buy	Source
22	DF	(Greece) Michalis Tsamourlidis	(Greece) Panionios	Free	28 January 2013	30 June 2013	✓	
—	MF	(Greece) Iraklis Garoufalias	(Greece) Asteras Magoula	Free	24 January 2013	30 June 2013	✗	

Notes

a. plus 10% of resale fee.
b. The player also agreed to give up the club's debt on him which was €165,000.
c. plus 50% of resale fee.

=== Overall transfer activity ===
==== Expenditure ====
Summer: ▼€415,000

Winter: ▼€50,000

Total: ▼€465,000

==== Income ====
Summer: ▲€1,950,000

Winter: ▲€0

Total: ▲€1,950,000

==== Net Totals ====
Summer: ▲€1,535,000

Winter: ▼€50,000

Total: ▲€1,485,000

== Pre-season and friendlies ==
15 July 2012 Friendly	Petrolul Ploiești	4–0	AEK Athens	Ploiești
22:00 EEST (UTC+3)	Mustivar 18'; Grozav 24', 69'; Cristescu 53'	Report	Garoufalias (yellow card) 43'	Stadium: Ilie Oană Stadium; Attendance: 10,000

28 July 2012 Friendly	Preston North End	1–0	AEK Athens	Preston
17:00 EEST (UTC+3)	Monakana 88'	Report		Stadium: Deepdale

29 July 2012 Friendly	Blackburn Rovers	2–1	AEK Athens	Fleetwood
16:00 EEST (UTC+3)	Gomes 7'; Best 29'	Report	Kourellas 76'	Stadium: Highbury Stadium; Attendance: 994

1 August 2012 Friendly	Wrexham	1–3	AEK Athens	Wrexham
13:00 EEST (UTC+3)	Rushton 1'	Report	Papadimitriou 46'; Grontis 82'; Kalogeris 87'	Stadium: Racecourse Ground; Referee: Kevin Bowker (England)

5 August 2012 Friendly	Notts County	1–0	AEK Athens	Nottingham
16:00 EEST (UTC+3)	Judge 18'	Report		Stadium: Meadow Lane
Note: Abandoned at the 45th minute due to rainfaill.

8 August 2012 Tony Hibbert Testimonial	Everton	4–1	AEK Athens	Liverpool
19:45 EEST (UTC+3)	Naismith 1', 17', 30'; Hibbert 53'	Report	Fountas 7'	Stadium: Goodison Park; Attendance: 17,508; Referee: Lee Mason (England)

14 August 2012 Friendly	Iraklis Psachna	0–1	AEK Athens	Psachna
20:00 EEST (UTC+3)		Report	Koutroumpis 43'	Stadium: Psachna Municipal Stadium; Attendance: 2,500

18 August 2012 Friendly	Panachaiki	1–1	AEK Athens	Patras
21:00 EEST (UTC+3)	Gourtsas 82'	Report	Kourellas 15'	Stadium: Kostas Davourlis Stadium

4 September 2012 Friendly	Ionikos	1–1	AEK Athens	Nikaia
18:00 EEST (UTC+3)	Giagelis 89' (pen.)	Report	Tsitas 47'	Stadium: Neapolis Public Stadium

7 September 2012 Friendly	Levadiakos	1–3	AEK Athens	Livadeia
19:00 EEST (UTC+3)	Macheras 77'	Report	Katsikokeris 52'; Furtado (penalty missed) 67', 69'; Stamatis 79'	Stadium: Levadia Municipal Stadium

13 October 2012 Friendly	Egaleo	1–3	AEK Athens	Egaleo
16:00 EEST (UTC+3)	Chaniotis 9'	Report	Koutroumpis 6'; Pavlis 61'; Kourellas 87'	Stadium: Stavros Mavrothalassitis Stadium; Attendance: 150

25 November 2012 Friendly	Kallithea	1–0	AEK Athens	Kallithea
15:00 EET (UTC+2)	Farinola 64'	Report		Stadium: Grigoris Lambrakis Stadium

29 December 2012 Charity match	Panerythraikos	0–2	AEK Athens	Nea Erythraia
19:00 EET (UTC+2)		Report	Petropoulos 15'; Cordero 65'	Stadium: Nea Erythraia Municipal Stadium; Attendance: 70

== Competitions ==
=== Overall record ===
Competition	First match	Last match	Starting round	Final position	Record							
Competition	First match	Last match	Starting round	Final position	Pld	W	D	L	GF	GA	GD	Win %
Super League	25 August 2012	21 April 2013	Matchday 1	15th	30	8	6	16	21	36	−15	26.67
Greek Cup	13 December 2012	20 December 2012	Round of 32	Round of 32	2	0	1	1	0	1	−1	0.00
Total					32	8	7	17	21	37	−16	25.00

Last updated: 21 April 2013
Source: Competitions

=== Super League Greece ===
==== League table ====
Pos	Team	Pld	W	D	L	GF	GA	GD	Pts	Qualification or relegation
12	Veria	30	8	9	13	30	35	−5	33 (Note: Head-to-head points (goal difference): Veria 3 (+1), Aris 3 (-1).)	
13	Aris	30	7	12	11	32	40	−8	33	
14	OFI	30	8	8	14	33	46	−13	32	
15	AEK Athens (Note: AEK Athens were deducted 3 points because of severe crowd violence during their home match against Panthrakikos this year. They were also voluntarily relegated to the third division in order to enter the liquidation process and remove a big number of debts to the club.) (R)	30	8	6	16	21	36	−15	27	Relegation to Gamma Ethniki
16	Kerkyra (R)	30	4	8	18	16	41	−25	20	Relegation to Football League

Source: Super League Greece
Rules for classification: 1) Points; 2) Head-to-head points; 3) Head-to-head goal difference.
If in current league table there are tied teams after applying criteria 1 to 3, they are considered to share places and listed in Greek language alphabetic order.
If in final league table there are still tied teams after applying criteria 1 to 3, a decision match (or matches if they are more than two) are to be played but only in three cases: to determine the champion, to fill spots in the play-off or to determine the teams to be relegated. In any other case, the final standings of tied teams are determined with a public draw
(R) Relegated

==== Results summary ====
Overall								Home						Away					
Pld	W	D	L	GF	GA	GD	Pts	W	D	L	GF	GA	GD	W	D	L	GF	GA	GD
30	8	6	16	21	36	−15	27	6	4	5	12	17	−5	2	2	11	9	19	−10

Last updated: 2013-04-21.
Source: Super League Greece

=== Results by Matchday ===
Round	1	2	3	4	5	6	7	8	9	10	11	12	13	14	15	16	17	18	19	20	21	22	23	24	25	26	27	28	29	30
Ground	H	A	H	A	A	H	A	H	A	H	A	H	H	A	H	A	H	A	H	H	A	H	A	H	A	H	A	A	H	A
Result	L	L	D	L	L	D	L	W	L	L	W	L	W	L	D	L	W	D	W	W	W	D	L	L	L	W	D	L	L	L
Position	16	16	16	16	16	16	16	16	16	16	16	16	16	16	16	16	15	15	14	12	12	13	13	14	15	14	14	15	15	15

Updated to match(es) played on 21 April 2013. Source: slgr.gr
A = Away; H = Home; W = Win; D = Draw; L = Loss; P = Postponed

==== Matches ====
25 August 2012 1	AEK Athens	0–1	Asteras Tripolis	Marousi
18:15 EEST (UTC+3)	Kontoes (yellow card) 60'; Furtado (yellow card) 60'	Report	Hegon (yellow card) 60'; Fragoulakis (yellow card) 85'; Álvarez 89'	Stadium: Olympic Stadium; Attendance: 9,959; Referee: Andreas Pappas (Athens)

1 September 2012 2	Skoda Xanthi	1–0	AEK Athens	Xanthi
21:30 EEST (UTC+3)	Markovski 58'; Mantalos (yellow card) 61'; Fliskas (yellow card) 78'; Viviani (yellow card) 79'; Baxevanidis (yellow card) 82'; Lodygin (yellow card) 86'; Marcelinho (yellow card) 90+1'	Report	Arkoudas (yellow card) 30'; Kourellas (yellow card) 43' (yellow-red card) 69'; Cordero (yellow card) 60'; Katidis (yellow card) 90'	Stadium: Skoda Xanthi Arena; Attendance: 2,184; Referee: Giorgos Daskalopoulos (Corinthia)

16 September 2012 3	AEK Athens	1–1	Aris	Marousi
20:30 EEST (UTC+3)	Koutroumpis (yellow card) 40'; Yago 58'; Katidis (yellow card) 52'; Cordero (yellow card) 64'; Papadimitriou (yellow card) 78'; V. Vlachos (yellow card) 89'	Report	Pantidos (yellow card) 28'; Coelho (yellow card) 35'; Aganzo 74'; Damarlis (yellow card) 83'; Gianniotas (yellow card) 90+4'; Dioudis (yellow card) 90+5'	Stadium: Olympic Stadium; Attendance: 12,145; Referee: Georgios Kominis (Thesprotia)

23 September 2012 4	OFI	2–1	AEK Athens	Heraklion
18:15 EEST (UTC+3)	Papazoglou (yellow card) 7'; Šišić 17' (pen.); Ioannidis 42' (pen.); Moniakis (yellow card) 66'; Charitonidis (yellow card) 81'; Gounaridis (yellow card) 90+2'	Report	Furtado 43', (yellow card) 47'	Stadium: Theodoros Vardinogiannis Stadium; Attendance: 2,659; Referee: Dimitris Thanos (Grevena)

29 September 2012 5	Panionios	1–0	AEK Athens	Nea Smyrni
17:15 EEST (UTC+3)	Kampantais 16'; Goundoulakis (yellow card) 42'; Kolovos (yellow card) 63'; Rovas (yellow card) 90'; Kouloucheris (yellow card) 90+2'; Andralas (yellow card) 90+3'	Report	Katidis (yellow card) 23'; Bougaidis (yellow card) 45+1'; Rikka (yellow card) 52'; Arkoudas (yellow card) 68'; Fountas (yellow card) 69' (yellow-red card) 87'; Guerreiro (yellow card) 72'	Stadium: Nea Smyrni Stadium; Attendance: 2,812; Referee: Alexandros Aretopoulos (Trikala)

6 October 2012 6	AEK Athens	1–1	Kerkyra	Marousi
17:15 EEST (UTC+3)	Koutroumpis (yellow card) 43'; Pavlis 74'; Cordero (yellow card) 83'	Report	Venetis 30', (yellow card) 48'; Giantsis (yellow card) 31'; Tsoumanis (yellow card) 48'; Karalis (yellow card) 53'; Iliadis (yellow card) 69'; Anastasopoulos (yellow card) 73'	Stadium: Olympic Stadium; Attendance: 7,852; Referee: Kostas Ioannidis (Argolida)

20 October 2012 7	PAOK	1–0	AEK Athens	Thessaloniki
19:30 EEST (UTC+3)	Athanasiadis 51'; Lawrence (yellow card) 65' (yellow-red card) 69'; Jacobo (yellow card) 90'	Report	Kontoes (yellow card) 53'; Fetsis (yellow card) 70'; Lagos (yellow card) 78'; Yago (yellow card) 86'; Kourellas (yellow card) 89'	Stadium: Toumba Stadium; Attendance: 15,239; Referee: Dimitris Thanos (Grevena)

28 October 2012 8	AEK Athens	1–0	Platanias	Marousi
19:30 EET (UTC+2)	V. Vlachos (yellow card) 49'; Fountas 66'; Fetsis (yellow card) 74'	Report	Potouridis (yellow card) 86'; Anastasakos (yellow card) 90+1'	Stadium: Olympic Stadium; Attendance: 8,826; Referee: Praxitelis Zachariadis (Macedonia)

4 November 2012 9	Panathinaikos	1–0	AEK Athens	Ampelokipoi
19:30 EET (UTC+2)	Toché 24'; Fourlanos (yellow card) 51'; Seitaridis (yellow card) 83'; Chouchoumis (yellow card) 85'	Report	Kontoes (yellow card) 40'; V. Vlachos (yellow card) 59'; Cordero (yellow card) 60'; Fountas (yellow card) 64'	Stadium: Leoforos Alexandras Stadium; Attendance: 12,528; Referee: Anastasios Kakos (Kerkyra)

11 November 2012 10	AEK Athens	0–4	Olympiacos	Marousi
19:30 EET (UTC+2)	Yago (red card) 22'; Fetsis (yellow card) 38'; K. Vlachos (yellow card) 77'	Report	Abdoun 23' (pen.), (yellow card) 90+1'; Holebas (yellow card) 45+1'; Mitroglou 57', 88'; Greco (yellow card) 73'; Fuster 85'	Stadium: Olympic Stadium; Attendance: 15,272; Referee: Anastasios Sidiropoulos (Dodecanese)

18 November 2012 11	Veria	0–4	AEK Athens	Veria
17:15 EET (UTC+2)	Kalogeris (yellow card) 49'; Kafes (red card) 56'	Report	Katidis 19'; Fountas 24'; Koutroumpis (yellow card) 42'; Lagos (yellow card) 45+1'; Guerreiro 57' (pen.), (yellow card) 58'; Fetsis (yellow card) 60'; V. Vlachos (yellow card) 73'; Stamatis 89'	Stadium: Veria Stadium; Attendance: 2,978; Referee: Michalis Voskakis (Rethymnο)

24 November 2012 12	AEK Athens	0–1	Levadiakos	Marousi
19:30 EET (UTC+2)	Kontoes (yellow card) 52'; V. Vlachos (yellow card) 81'; Kotsaridis (yellow card) 85'	Report	Georgiou (yellow card) 13'; Moulopoulos (yellow card) 57'; Napoleoni 81'; Kasmeridis (yellow card) 83'	Stadium: Olympic Stadium; Attendance: 7,751; Referee: Athanasios Giachos (Chios)

3 December 2012 13	AEK Athens	2–1	PAS Giannina	Marousi
19:30 EET (UTC+2)	Fountas 2', (yellow card) 50'; Guerreiro (penalty missed) 37', (yellow card) 90+3'; Stamatis 82'; Pavlis (yellow card) 90+1'; Konstantopoulos (yellow card) 90+4'	Report	Michail 26', (yellow card) 57'; Fegrouche (yellow card) 37'; Lila (yellow card) 58'; De Vincenti (yellow card) 88'; Pantos (yellow card) 90+2'	Stadium: Olympic Stadium; Attendance: 5,263; Referee: Dimitris Styliaras (Aetoloacarnania)

10 December 2012 14	Panthrakikos	1–0	AEK Athens	Komotini
19:30 EET (UTC+2)	Cherfa (yellow card) 7'; Vahirua 62'	Report	Kotsaridis (yellow card) 10'; Pavlis (yellow card) 53'; Arkoudas (yellow card) 74'	Stadium: Komotini Municipal Stadium; Attendance: 2,353; Referee: Praxitelis Zachariadis (Macedonia)

16 December 2012 15	AEK Athens	1–1	Atromitos	Marousi
15:00 EET (UTC+2)	Koutroumpis (yellow card) 26'; Stamatis 66'; Fountas (yellow card) 69'; Tsoupros (yellow card) 75'; V. Vlachos (yellow card) 78'	Report	Dimoutsos (yellow card) 29'; Iglesias (yellow card) 39', (goal) 76'; Brito (yellow card) 64'	Stadium: Olympic Stadium; Attendance: 6,005; Referee: Anastasios Kakos (Kerkyra)

5 January 2013 16	Asteras Tripolis	3–1	AEK Athens	Tripoli
17:15 EET (UTC+2)	Bartolini (yellow card) 35'; De Blasis 36'; Álvarez (yellow card) 54'; Rayos 65'; Perrone 71'; Formica (yellow card) 35'	Report	Koutroumpis 20'; Grontis (yellow card) 64'	Stadium: Asteras Tripolis Stadium; Attendance: 2,703; Referee: Stavros Tritsonis (Athens)

12 January 2013 17	AEK Athens	1–0	Skoda Xanthi	Marousi
17:15 EET (UTC+2)	Mitropoulos (yellow card) 27'; Petropoulos 68', (yellow card) 69'	Report	Vasilakakis (yellow card) 27'; Dié (yellow card) 41'; Baxevanidis (yellow card) 78'	Stadium: Olympic Stadium; Attendance: 5,983; Referee: Georgios Kominis (Thesprotia)

20 January 2013 18	Aris	1–1	AEK Athens	Thessaloniki
19:30 EET (UTC+2)	Ikonomopoulos (yellow card) 41'; Aganzo (yellow card) 58' (yellow-red card) 85', (goal) 84'; Pulido (yellow card) 67' (yellow-red card) 81'; Zaradoukas (yellow card) 90+2'	Report	Tsoupros (yellow card) 7' (yellow-red card) 81'; V. Vlachos (yellow card) 49' (yellow-red card) 89'; Katidis (yellow card) 59'; Tsoumagas (yellow card) 70'; Karalis (yellow card) 79'; Cordero (yellow card) 90'; Petropoulos 90+6'	Stadium: Kleanthis Vikelidis Stadium; Attendance: 9,640; Referee: Anastasios Kakos (Kerkyra)

26 January 2013 19	AEK Athens	2–1	OFI	Marousi
19:30 EET (UTC+2)	Petropoulos 56'; Koutroumpis (yellow card) 66'; Pavlis 81'	Report	Verón (yellow card) 7'; Banousis (yellow card) 55'; Souza (yellow card) 66', (goal) 40'	Stadium: Olympic Stadium; Attendance: 5,907; Referee: Stavros Tritsonis (Athens)

2 February 2013 20	AEK Athens	1–0	Panionios	Marousi
17:15 EET (UTC+2)	Guerreiro 12'; Fetsis (yellow card) 37'; Fountas (yellow card) 62'; Cordero (yellow card) 80'; Katidis (penalty missed) 84'; Furtado (yellow card) 87'	Report	Avlonitis (yellow card) 11'; Toskas (yellow card) 35'; Samaris (yellow card) 37'; Dounis (yellow card) 66'; Peristeridis (yellow card) 83'; Smyrlis (yellow card) 90+3'	Stadium: Olympic Stadium; Attendance: 11,929; Referee: Charalampos Kalogeropoulos (Athens)

10 February 2013 21	Kerkyra	0–1	AEK Athens	Corfu
17:15 EET (UTC+2)	Giantsis (yellow card) 47'	Report	Guerreiro 14' (pen.); Koutroumpis (yellow card) 24'; Cordero (yellow card) 33' (yellow-red card) 63'	Stadium: Kerkyra Stadium; Attendance: 747; Referee: Dimitris Thanos (Grevena)

16 February 2013 22	AEK Athens	0–0	PAOK	Marousi
19:30 EET (UTC+2)	Mitropoulos (yellow card) 66'; Fountas (yellow card) 83'	Report	Kaçe (yellow card) 15'; Katsouranis (yellow card) 30'; Lawrence (yellow card) 85'	Stadium: Olympic Stadium; Attendance: 15,105; Referee: Alexandros Aretopoulos (Trikala)

24 February 2013 23	Platanias	2–1	AEK Athens	Chania
17:15 EET (UTC+2)	Nazlidis 3'; Dimitris (yellow card) 16'; Anastasakos 75' (pen.), (yellow card) 90'; Aguilera (yellow card) 76'	Report	Mitropoulos (yellow card) 2'; Fetsis 17', (yellow card) 64'; Tsoumagas (yellow card) 58'; Fountas (yellow card) 77'	Stadium: Perivolia Municipal Stadium; Attendance: 2,963; Referee: Kostas Ioannidis (Argolida)

3 March 2013 24	AEK Athens	0–2	Panathinaikos	Marousi
19:30 EET (UTC+2)	Tsoukalas (yellow card) 27'; Bougaidis (yellow card) 69'; Guerreiro (yellow card) 72'	Report	Marinos (yellow card) 54'; Vitolo 55', (yellow card) 63'; Zeca (yellow card) 60'; Sow 70'; Boumsong (yellow card) 77'	Stadium: Olympic Stadium; Attendance: 16,919; Referee: Ilias Spathas (Piraeus)

10 March 2013 25	Olympiacos	3–0	AEK Athens	Piraeus
19:30 EET (UTC+2)	Papadopoulos 14', 56', (yellow card) 84'; Papazoglou (yellow card) 58'; Abdoun 62'	Report	Cordero (yellow card) 49'; Bougaidis (yellow card) 78'; Guerreiro (yellow card) 78'	Stadium: Karaiskakis Stadium; Attendance: 30,293; Referee: Athanasios Giachos (Chios)

16 March 2013 26	AEK Athens	2–1	Veria	Marousi
19:30 EET (UTC+2)	Fountas 3'; Katidis 84', (yellow card) 85'	Report	Olaitan 78'	Stadium: Olympic Stadium; Attendance: 7,824; Referee: Stavros Mantalos (Athens)
Note: The celebration of Katidis with a nazi salute after his goal was handed a life ban from all the departments of the national team by the HFF.

31 March 2013 27	Levadiakos	0–0	AEK Athens	Livadeia
17:15 EEST (UTC+3)	Josemi (yellow card) 24' (yellow-red card) 90+4'; Mendy (yellow card) 51'; Vasiliou (yellow card) 61'; Moulopoulos (yellow card) 83'; Korbos (yellow card) 90+1'	Report	Fountas (yellow card) 29' (yellow-red card) 90+4'; Cordero (yellow card) 37'; Tsoukalas (yellow card) 61'; Mitropoulos (yellow card) 90+3'	Stadium: Levadia Municipal Stadium; Attendance: 1,287; Referee: Michalis Voskakis (Rethymnο)

8 April 2013 28	PAS Giannina	2–0	AEK Athens	Ioannina
19:30 EEST (UTC+3)	Korovesis 35'; Georgiou 39'; Fegrouche (yellow card) 57'; Tzimopoulos (yellow card) 86'; Michail (yellow card) 90+3'	Report	Furtado (yellow card) 63'; V. Vlachos (yellow card) 78'; Petropoulos (yellow card) 88'; Guerreiro (yellow card) 90+2'	Stadium: Zosimades Stadium; Attendance: 2,674; Referee: Athanasios Giachos (Chios)

14 April 2013 29	AEK Athens	0−3 (Awarded)	Panthrakikos	Marousi
19:00 EEST (UTC+3)	Anakoglou (yellow card) 45+2'; Fetsis (yellow card) 59'	Report	Christou (yellow card) 16'; Lucero (yellow card) 32'; Kašćelan (yellow card) 47'; Bougaidis 87' (o.g.)	Stadium: Olympic Stadium; Attendance: 22,587; Referee: Stavros Tritsonis (Athens)
Note: After the own goal by Bougaidis, an invasion by AEK ultras immediately evolved and forced the players of both teams to flee. The match was interrupted at 0–1 with huge incidents on the pitch between the ultras and the police. Players of both clubs were also injured during their departure at the entrance tunnel. An hour later, the suspension of the match was decided by the referee. The match was awarded by 3–0 to Panthrakikos and AEK were punished with a 3-point deduction.

21 April 2013 30	Atromitos	1–0	AEK Athens	Peristeri
19:00 EEST (UTC+3)	Karagounis (yellow card) 87'; Giannoulis 90+3'	Report	Bougaidis (yellow card) 47'; Fountas (yellow card) 90+1'	Stadium: Peristeri Stadium; Attendance: 1,632; Referee: Andreas Pappas (Athens)
Note: The darkest day in the history of AEK Athens since they are relegated and formally, for the first time in their history.

=== Greek Cup ===
==== Round of 32 ====
13 December 2012 First leg	Kavala	0–0	AEK Athens	Kavala
18:30 EET (UTC+2)	Tsoukalas (yellow card) 36'; Yago (yellow card) 39'; Tsoupros (yellow card) 59'	Report	Chloros (yellow card) 56'; Nsaliwa (yellow card) 82'	Stadium: Anthi Karagianni Stadium; Referee: Stefanos Mantakis (Imathia)

20 December 2012 Second leg	AEK Athens	0–1 (0–1 agg.)	Kavala	Marousi
20:00 EET (UTC+2)	Bougaidis (yellow card) 51'; Arabatzis (yellow card) 54'; Pavlis (yellow card) 70'; Lagos (yellow card) 71'; Tsoupros (yellow card) 90+4'	Report	Kalanganis (yellow card) 37'; Bracjani (yellow card) 40' (yellow-red card) 90'; Nsaliwa 53'; Pagonis (yellow card) 87'; Tripotseris (yellow card) 90+4'; Apostolidis (yellow card) 90+4'	Stadium: Olympic Stadium; Attendance: 300; Referee: Michalis Voskakis (Rethymno)

== Statistics ==
=== Squad statistics ===
As of 21 April 2013

No.	Pos	Player	Super League		Greek Cup		Total	
No.	Pos	Player	Apps	Goals	Apps	Goals	Apps	Goals
Goalkeepers
1	GK	(Greece) Dimitrios Konstantopoulos	24	0	0	0	24	0
28	GK	(Greece) Theodoros Moschonas	0	0	0	0	0	0
89	GK	(Greece) Ilias Makryonitis	0	0	0	0	0	0
99	GK	(Greece) Giannis Arabatzis	8	0	2	0	10	0
Defenders
3	DF	(Portugal) Yago Fernández	13	1	1	0	14	1
18	DF	(Greece) Dinos Nikolopoulos	0	0	0	0	0	0
24	DF	(Greece) Konstantinos Vlachos	0	0	0	0	0	0
34	DF	(Greece) Anastasios Tsoumagas	13	0	0	0	13	0
37	DF	(Greece) Valentinos Vlachos	18	0	1	0	19	0
47	DF	(Greece) Mavroudis Bougaidis	18	0	2	0	20	0
77	DF	(Greece) Christos Arkoudas	13	0	1	0	14	0
81	DF	(Greece) Konstantinos Tsoupros	4	0	2	0	6	0
91	DF	(Greece) Georgios Koutroumpis	29	1	1	0	30	1
92	DF	(Greece) Sokratis Tsoukalas	7	0	2	0	9	0
Midfielders
6	MF	(Spain) Miguel Cordero	23	0	0	0	23	0
8	MF	(Greece) Georgios Katidis	20	2	1	0	21	2
10	MF	(Poland) Roger Guerreiro	27	3	1	0	28	3
13	MF	(Greece) Antonis Rikka	16	0	1	0	17	0
21	MF	(Greece) Taxiarchis Fountas	27	4	0	0	27	4
23	MF	(Greece) Xenofon Fetsis	19	1	0	0	19	1
30	MF	(Ghana) Joseph Agyriba	0	0	0	0	0	0
32	MF	(Greece) Enias Kalogeris	0	0	0	0	0	0
39	MF	(Greece) Dimitrios Anastasopoulos	3	0	0	0	3	0
44	MF	(Greece) Dimitrios Anakoglou	4	0	0	0	4	0
63	MF	(Greece) Christos Papadimitriou	5	0	2	0	7	0
66	MF	(Greece) Alexandros Nikolias	1	0	0	0	1	0
80	MF	(Greece) Dimitris Grontis	5	0	2	0	7	0
82	MF	(Greece) Pavlos Mitropoulos	14	0	0	0	14	0
88	MF	(Greece) Nikos Kourellas	4	0	1	0	5	0
—	MF	(Cyprus) Georgios Aresti	0	0	0	0	0	0
Forwards
7	FW	(Greece) Nikolaos Katsikokeris	7	0	2	0	9	0
9	FW	(Greece) Thomas Tsitas	5	0	1	0	6	0
11	FW	(Greece) Michalis Pavlis	13	2	2	0	15	2
14	FW	(Greece) Andreas Stamatis	10	3	2	0	12	3
22	FW	(Cape Verde) José Furtado	18	1	0	0	18	1
33	FW	(Greece) Antonis Petropoulos	13	3	0	0	13	3
70	FW	(Greece) Giannis Karalis	8	0	0	0	8	0
Left during Winter Transfer Window
2	DF	(Greece) Giannis Kontoes	15	0	0	0	15	0
22	DF	(Greece) Michalis Tsamourlidis	0	0	0	0	0	0
12	MF	(Greece) Konstantinos Kotsaridis	5	0	0	0	5	0
19	MF	(Greece) Panagiotis Lagos	10	0	1	0	11	0

=== Goalscorers ===
As of 21 April 2013
The list is sorted by competition order when total goals are equal, then by position and then by squad number.

Rank	No.	Pos.	Player	Super League	Greek Cup	Total
1	21	MF	(Greece) Taxiarchis Fountas	4	0	4
2	10	MF	(Poland) Roger Guerreiro	3	0	3
2	14	FW	(Greece) Andreas Stamatis	3	0	3
2	33	FW	(Greece) Antonis Petropoulos	3	0	3
5	11	FW	(Greece) Michalis Pavlis	2	0	2
5	8	MF	(Greece) Georgios Katidis	2	0	2
7	20	FW	(Cape Verde) José Furtado	1	0	1
7	3	DF	(Portugal) Yago Fernández	1	0	1
7	91	DF	(Greece) Georgios Koutroumpis	1	0	1
7	23	MF	(Greece) Xenofon Fetsis	1	0	1
Own goals				0	0	0
Totals				21	0	21

=== Assists ===
As of 21 April 2013
The list is sorted by competition order when total assists are equal, then by position and then by squad number.

Rank	No.	Pos.	Player	Super League	Greek Cup	Total
1	10	MF	(Poland) Roger Guerreiro	3	0	3
2	34	DF	(Greece) Anastasios Tsoumagas	2	0	2
2	6	MF	(Spain) Miguel Cordero	2	0	2
4	13	MF	(Greece) Antonis Rikka	1	0	1
4	8	MF	(Greece) Georgios Katidis	1	0	1
4	21	MF	(Greece) Taxiarchis Fountas	1	0	1
4	11	FW	(Greece) Michalis Pavlis	1	0	1
Totals				11	0	11

=== Clean sheets ===
As of 21 April 2013
The list is sorted by competition order when total clean sheets are equal and then by squad number. Clean sheets in games where both goalkeepers participated are awarded to the goalkeeper who started the game. Goalkeepers with no appearances are not included.

Rank	No.	Player	Super League	Greek Cup	Total
1	1	(Greece) Dimitrios Konstantopoulos	7	0	7
2	99	(Greece) Giannis Arabatzis	0	1	1
Totals			7	1	8

=== Disciplinary record ===
As of 21 April 2013

N	P	Nat.	Name	Super League			Greek Cup			Total			Notes
N	P	Nat.	Name	Yellow card	Second yellow card	Red card	Yellow card	Second yellow card	Red card	Yellow card	Second yellow card	Red card	Notes
Goalkeepers
1	GK	(Greece)	Dimitrios Konstantopoulos	1						1			
28	GK	(Greece)	Theodoros Moschonas										
89	GK	(Greece)	Ilias Makryonitis										
99	GK	(Greece)	Giannis Arabatzis				1			1			
Defenders
3	DF	(Portugal)	Yago Fernández	1		1	1			2		1	
18	DF	(Greece)	Dinos Nikolopoulos										
24	DF	(Greece)	Konstantinos Vlachos										
34	DF	(Greece)	Anastasios Tsoumagas	2						2			
37	DF	(Greece)	Valentinos Vlachos	10	1					10	1		
47	DF	(Greece)	Mavroudis Bougaidis	4			1			5			
77	DF	(Greece)	Christos Arkoudas	3						3			
81	DF	(Greece)	Konstantinos Tsoupros	3	1		2			5	1		
91	DF	(Greece)	Georgios Koutroumpis	6						6			
92	DF	(Greece)	Sokratis Tsoukalas	2			1			3			
Midfielders
6	MF	(Spain)	Miguel Cordero	9	1					9	1		
8	MF	(Greece)	Georgios Katidis	5						5			
10	MF	(Poland)	Roger Guerreiro	6						6			
13	MF	(Greece)	Antonis Rikka	1						1			
21	MF	(Greece)	Taxiarchis Fountas	11	2					11	2		
23	MF	(Greece)	Xenofon Fetsis	6						6			
30	MF	(Ghana)	Joseph Agyriba										
32	MF	(Greece)	Enias Kalogeris										
39	MF	(Greece)	Dimitrios Anastasopoulos										
44	MF	(Greece)	Dimitrios Anakoglou	1						1			
63	MF	(Greece)	Christos Papadimitriou	1						1			
66	MF	(Greece)	Alexandros Nikolias										
80	MF	(Greece)	Dimitris Grontis	1						1			
82	MF	(Greece)	Pavlos Mitropoulos	4						4			
88	MF	(Greece)	Nikos Kourellas	3	1					3	1		
—	MF	(Cyprus)	Georgios Aresti										
Forwards
7	MF	(Greece)	Nikolaos Katsikokeris										
9	FW	(Greece)	Thomas Tsitas										
11	FW	(Greece)	Michalis Pavlis	2			1			3			
14	FW	(Greece)	Andreas Stamatis										
20	FW	(Cape Verde)	José Furtado	4						4			
33	FW	(Greece)	Antonis Petropoulos	2						2			
70	FW	(Greece)	Giannis Karalis	1						1			
Left during Winter Transfer window
2	DF	(Greece)	Giannis Kontoes	4						4			
22	DF	(Greece)	Michalis Tsamourlidis										
12	MF	(Greece)	Konstantinos Kotsaridis	2						2			
19	MF	(Greece)	Panagiotis Lagos	2			1			3			

=== Starting 11 ===
This section presents the most frequently used formation along with the players with the most starts across all competitions.

N.	Formation	Matchday(s)
17	4–4–2 (D)	13–29
12	4–2–3–1	2, 4–7, 9–12, 30
2	4–3–3	1, 8
1	4–4–2	3

No.	Nat.	Player	Pos.
1	(Greece)	Dimitrios Konstantopoulos	GK
91	(Greece)	Georgios Koutroumpis	RCB
47	(Greece)	Mavroudis Bougaidis	LCB
37	(Greece)	Valentinos Vlachos	RB
34	(Greece)	Anastasios Tsoumagas	LB
82	(Greece)	Pavlos Mitropoulos	DM
23	(Greece)	Xenofon Fetsis	RCM
6	(Spain)	Miguel Cordero	LCM
10	(Poland)	Roger Guerreiro (C)	AM
21	(Greece)	Taxiarchis Fountas	SS
33	(Greece)	Antonis Petropoulos	CF

Last updated: 2013-04-21

== Awards ==
Player	Pos.	Award	Source
(Greece) Taxiarchis Fountas	FW	Best Goal Award (11th Matchday)	
(Greece) Antonis Petropoulos	FW	Best Goal Award (17th Matchday)	
