= Sokratis Tsoukalas =

Greek footballer

Personal information
- Full name: Sokratis Tsoukalas
- Date of birth: 7 July 1992 (age 34)
- Place of birth: Athens, Greece
- Height: 1.80 m (5 ft 11 in)
- Position: Right back

Team information
- Current team: Aris Petroupolis

Youth career
- Apollon Smyrnis
- Atromitos
- Olympiakos Neon Liosion
- A.O. Peristeri
- Palermo Primavera

Senior career*
Years	Team	Apps	(Gls)
2009–2010	A.O. Peristeri	26	(2)
2010–2011	Palermo	0	(0)
2011–2014	AEK Athens	20	(1)
2012	→ Apollon Smyrnis (loan)	9	(0)
2014	Fokikos	0	(0)
2015	Panserraikos		
2015	AO Chalkis		
2016	Sparti		
2016	A.E. Irakleio		
2016–2017	Asteras Vlachioti	5	(1)
2018–2019	Aspropyrgos	0	(0)
2019–2021	Olympiakos Neon Liosion		
2021	Finikas Neas Epidavrou		
2022–	Aris Petroupolis		
- * Club domestic league appearances and goals

Sokratis Tsoukalas (Greek: Σωκράτης Τσουκαλάς; born on 7 July 1992) is a Greek footballer who plays for Asteras Vlachioti as a right back.

== Career ==
=== AEK Athens ===
In 2011, Sokratis Tsoukalas was signed by Greek side AEK Athens. He made his debut against SK Sturm Graz in the UEFA Europa League on 14 December 2011. Although AEK Athens was relegated to the 3rd Division in order the team's debt to be erased, Tsoukalas was agreed to stay and help AEK for the big comeback to Super League Greece alongside Kostas Tsoupros, Anastasios Tsoumagas, Dimitris Anakoglou, Miguel Cordero, Dimitris Grontis and Michalis Pavlis. However, his contract was terminated on 3 July 2014.

== Honours ==
=== Club ===
AEK Athens

- Football League 2: 2013–14 (Group 6)
