= Ilias Makryonitis =

Greek footballer

Personal information
- Date of birth: 10 April 1989 (age 37)
- Place of birth: Athens, Greece
- Height: 1.90 m (6 ft 3 in)
- Position: Goalkeeper

Youth career
- –2006: Proodeftiki

Senior career*
Years	Team	Apps	(Gls)
2006–2007	Proodeftiki	1	(0)
2007–2008	Vyzas	0	(0)
2008–2010	Proodeftiki	0	(0)
2010–2011	Andagoras Kos	0	(0)
2011–2012	PAO Rouf	5	(0)
2012–2013	AEK Athens	0	(0)
2013–2014	Ionikos	0	(0)
2014	Glyfada	0	(0)
2015	Chania	0	(0)
2015	Ilisiakos	0	(0)
2016	Irakleio	0	(0)
2016–2017	Doxa Megalopolis	0	(0)
2017	Panelefsiniakos	17	(0)
2017–2018	Sparti	14	(0)
2018	Keratsini	0	(0)
2018–2019	Ionikos	0	(0)
2019–2020	Olympiacos Volos	4	(0)
2020–2021	Ilioupoli		
2021–2022	Proodeftiki		
- * Club domestic league appearances and goals as of 19 October 2019

Ilias Makryonitis (Greek: Ηλίας Μακρυωνίτης; born 10 April 1989) is a Greek professional footballer who plays as a goalkeeper.

== Career ==
Makryonitis started playing football in the AEK Athens youth ranks. He advanced to the first team on 20 August 2012, signing for four years, as the 4th goalkeeper, behind Konstantopoulos, Arabatzis and Moschonas. He then became the 3rd goalkeeper, moving ahead of Moschonas. Before he signed with AEK, he played for Proodeftiki, Vyzas and PAO Rouf, but he played in only 6 games - one for Proodeftiki in the 2006–2007 season, one for PAO Rouf in 2010–2011, and four in the next season.
