= Joseph Agyriba =

Ghanaian footballer (born 1989)

Personal information
- Date of birth: 13 February 1989 (age 37)
- Place of birth: Accra, Ghana
- Position: Midfielder

Youth career
- Red Star

Senior career*
Years	Team	Apps	(Gls)
2008–2010	Benevento		
2010–2013	AEK Athens	0	(0)
2010–2011	→ Diagoras (loan)	25	(3)
2011–2012	→ Glyfada (loan)	14	(0)
2014	Torre Levante		
2014–2015	Red Star	2	(0)
2015–2016	UJA Maccabi Paris Métropole	6	(1)
2016–2018	Racing Colombes 92		
- * Club domestic league appearances and goals as of 19:37, 27 August 2017 (UTC)

Joseph Agyriba (born 13 February 1989) is a Ghanaian professional footballer who last played as a midfielder for Championnat National 3 club Racing Colombes 92.

== Career ==
Born in Accra, Ghana, Agyriba came through the youth system at Red Star. He has played in Italy with Benevento and has played in Greece for AEK Athens, Diagoras and Glyfada. On 28 January 2014, Agyriba signed a contract with Tercera División club CF Torre Levante. In June 2014 Agyriba signed a contract with Championnat National club Red Star.

On 20 February 2016, Agyriba scores his first goal with UJA Maccabi Paris Métropole against US Sénart-Moissy. In August 2017 Agyriba renewed his contract with Championnat National 3 club Racing Colombes 92.
