= Georgios Aresti =

Cypriot professional football player

Giorgos Aresti
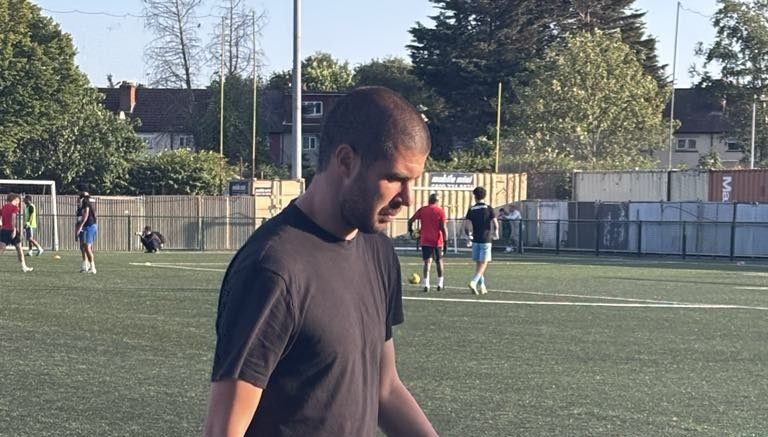
- Georgios Aresti in 2025.

Personal information
- Full name: Georgios Aresti
- Date of birth: 2 September 1994 (age 32)
- Place of birth: Limassol, Cyprus
- Height: 1.80 m (5 ft 11 in)
- Position: Midfielder

Team information
- Current team: Haringey Borough

Youth career
- 2009–2012: AEK Athens

Senior career*
Years	Team	Apps	(Gls)
2012–2013	AEK Athens	0	(0)
2012	→ Glyfada (loan)	0	(0)
2013–2014	Enosis Neon Paralimni	16	(0)
2014–2015	Ayia Napa	12	(0)
2015–2016	Doxa Katokopias	21	(0)
2016–2018	Ethnikos Achna	43	(0)
2018–	Haringey Borough	31	(5)

International career
2010–2011	Cyprus U-17	2	(0)
2011–2012	Cyprus U-19	1	(0)
2015–2016	Cyprus U-21	10	(0)
2014–	Cyprus	2	(0)
- * Club domestic league appearances and goals

Giorgos Aresti (Greek: Γιώργος Αρέστη; born 2 September 1994 in Limassol) is a Cypriot professional football player who plays as a midfielder for Haringey Borough in the Isthmian League Premier Division.

He has previously played for AEK Athens, Glyfada FC, Enosis Neon Paralimni, Ayia Napa FC, Doxa Katokopias and Ethnikos Achna.

== Club career ==
=== Early career ===
Born in Limassol, Cyprus, Aresti started playing football at the age of six for Campus Sportivo football academy, later known as Le Masia. He then transferred to Apollon Limassol academies for a year in 2008–2009. In his early days, he played as a left winger. During that year he was scouted by Nottingham Forest F.C. and AEK Athens F.C. In 2009, Aresti got trials with AEK Athens F.C. in Athens, Nottingham Forest F.C. camp in Limassol, Cyprus and Arsenal F.C. camp in Paphos, Cyprus. He was then offered a semi-professional contract with AEK Athens F.C. and moved to Athens in 2009. In 2009 an Aresti signed a semi-professional contract with AEK Athens F.C. for 3 years (2009–2012). During that period he had 73 appearances.

=== AEK Athens ===
In November 2011, the manager of AEK Athens, Mr. Nikos Kostenoglou, noticed him and offered him his first professional contract in 2012 for 3 years. In August 2012, Aresti was on a loan to Glyfada for a year.

=== Enosis Neon Paralimni ===
In 2013, AEK Athens was going through and economical crisis and that led to the subdivision of the club to the third division league in Greece. Aresti was then released from his contract, and returned to Cyprus in order to find a football club. He went through trials with Anorthosis Famagusta FC and Enosis Neon Paralimni FC. At the end, at the age of 19 years old, he was offered a professional football contract with Enosis Neon Paralimni FC for a duration of 3 years.

The 2013–14 season, was Aresti's peak career season, with 16 appearances in the first division league of Cyprus. His former manager in Enosis Neon Paralimni FC, Mr. Nicos Andronicou, was the first to trust Aresti and gave him opportunities to reveal his talent. It was the time where he was seen and noticed by all the Cypriot football clubs.

=== Ayia Napa, Doxa Katokopias ===
In 2014, Aresti was transferred to Ayia Napa from Enosis Neon Paralimni. He followed his manager, Mr. Nicos Andronicou. He signed a contract for a year and he had 12 appearances.

In January 2015, he transferred to Doxa Katokopias FC where he signed a contract for 3 years. At the end, he only played there for a year and a half where he had 21 appearances under the management of Mr. Slobodan Krčmarević.

=== Ethnikos Achnas ===
In May 2016, Aresti transferred to Ethnikos Achna, where he signed a 2 years professional contract. The transfer was made by his former manager, Panagiotis Engomitis. Since then, he managed to complete 34 appearances.

=== Haringey Borough ===
Aresti moved to the UK and joined Haringey Borough in July 2018. He has joined the team during preseason and has already played in 5 league games for Bostik Premier Division. He has also participated in 2 Emirates FA Cup. Aresti has scored his first goal since moving to the UK during the game for the Emirates FA Cup against Brentwood Town. He was in the starting line-up of Haringey Borough's record breaking FA Cup 1st Round match against Wimbledon but was subbed off in the 53rd minute.

== International career ==
His hard work paid off after he was included in the national team squad by the former national team manager, Pambos Christodoulou in 2014. It was Aresti's first call for the Cyprus for a friendly game against Northern Ireland.

His first appearance for Cyprus was shortly after as a substitution, in May 2014 at a friendly game against Japan. For a football player at the age of 20 to play in Saitama Stadium 2002 in front of almost 60 000 people, that was a big opportunity.

Aresti, was then included in the starting eleven for the game of Cyprus against Croatia in September 2014. He had to face players such as Luka Modrić, Mario Mandžukić, Vedran Ćorluka and Mateo Kovačić.

Aresti was also included in the squad for the Cyprus game against Bosnia for the Euro qualification rounds in 2016.
