= Antonis Petropoulos =

Greek footballer (born in 1986)

Personal information
- Full name: Antonios Petropoulos
- Date of birth: 28 January 1986 (age 40)
- Place of birth: Athens, Greece
- Height: 1.91 m (6 ft 3 in)
- Position: Striker

Senior career*
Years	Team	Apps	(Gls)
2003–2007	Egaleo	27	(4)
2004–2005	→ Keratsini (loan)	27	(5)
2005–2006	→ Chaidari (loan)	25	(4)
2007–2012	Panathinaikos	51	(12)
2008	→ OFI (loan)	10	(4)
2013	AEK Athens	13	(3)
2013–2014	Apollon Smyrnis	27	(12)
2014	OFI	14	(2)
2015	AEL Kalloni	11	(2)
2015–2016	Bari	5	(0)
2016–2017	Apollon Smyrnis	24	(9)
2017–2018	Doxa Drama	5	(1)
2018	Platanias	8	(2)
2019	Aspropyrgos	9	(6)
2019–2020	Egaleo	6	(0)
2020	Ethnikos Piraeus		
2020–2021	Ilioupoli		

International career^{‡}
2004–2005	Greece U19	14	(5)
2005–2008	Greece U21	16	(8)
- * Club domestic league appearances and goals as of 18 April 2019 ‡ National team caps and goals as of 27 January 2013

Antonis Petropoulos (Greek: Αντώνης Πετρόπουλος; born 28 January 1986) is a Greek former professional footballer who played as a striker.

He was also part of the Greece youth national team & currently serves as the technical director of Tilikratis

== Career ==
=== Egaleo ===
Petropoulos was born on 28 January 1986 in Athens, Greece. He scored 4 goals in total, 3 of them in his last two games with Egaleo. He scored his first goal against Kerkyra in 2006, and 2 goals against Ethnikos Asteras in 2008.

=== Panathinaikos ===
In January 2008, Petropoulos joined Panathinaikos signing a contract with a minimum release fee clause of €6,000,000 and a year later has signed a new 3-year contract with the club. Petropoulos is believed to have signed a deal that could see his annual wage rise from €45,000 to €150,000. The striker spoke of his pleasure at having re-signed with the club following the completion of the deal. "I am extremely happy to stay at Panathinaikos," Petropoulos said. "I want to play at this club for many more years. I want to thank my coach, Henk Ten Cate and the management; I will fight to justify the confidence they have shown in me." He scored 7 times in the 2008–09 season, however he remained in the bench for the whole of 2009–10 season as Djibril Cissé was the main offence choice. Due to a Cisse injury, he started the premiere of the 2010–11 season against Xanthi, where he scored the only goal for Panathinaikos in a match that ended 1–1. On 19 December 2012 he played and scored against Proodeftiki in the Greek cup for his last time with Panathinaikos.

Petropoulos joined the Cretan side on a loan deal from Panathinaikos . He scored 4 goals in total, one against Veria.

=== AEK Athens ===
After the mayhem of transfer deadline day, a reminder – perhaps – that the best things in life are free. Unable to get regular football in five years at Panathinaikos, Petropoulos was released and immediately signed by stricken giants AEK Athens, bottom of the Super league with three wins in 15 top-flight matches. Petropoulos became the 19th player who transferred from Panathinaikos to rivals AEK Athens.

However, since his debut in the 3–1 loss at Asteras Tripolis in early January, he has scored in each of AEK's next three games, with the resulting seven points lifting his side – never relegated – to 12th in the 16-team competition. More specifically, he scored his first goal in a Super League match against Skoda Xanthi. He scored another goal against Aris on 20 January with a great header after a cross by Michalis Pavlis He scored for third match in a row against OFI. "I don't even want to utter the word 'relegation' – we are talking about AEK and I cannot imagine a league without AEK," said Petropoulos, who celebrated his 27th birthday on Monday. "I feel better now going onto the pitch because I am playing for a club who believe in me. I have nothing to prove. I know who I am and I always do my best."

=== Apollon Smyrnis, OFI and AEL Kalloni ===
On 20 June 2013 Petropoulos, after the relegation of AEK], signed a €130,000 one-year contract with the newly promoted in Super League, Apollon Smyrnis.

On 18 August 2013, Petropoulos made his debut with his new team and scored one goal in a 2–1 home victory against Aris. Besides the fact that Apollon Smyrnis did not avoid relegation, Petropoulos had the best year in his career by scoring 12 goals. As a result of this, Metz, Chievo Verona and Hellas Verona became interested in him.

In the summer of 2014 due to the relegation of Apollon Smyrnis to the second division Petropoulos signed for OFI, joined the club for second time in his career. He scored a 91st-minute winner on his debut. Petropoulos left OFI half a year later due to serious financial problems at the club.

On 21 January 2015, Petropoulos agreed with AEL Kalloni till the end of 2014–15 season. On 12 May 2015, he solved his contract with the club.

=== Bari 1908 ===
Petropoulos passes for the first time in his career, the Greek borders in order to pursue his career in Italian club Bari 1908 playing for Serie B. The Greek winger passed the medical examinations, signing a two years' contract with the club for an undisclosed fee. On 17 October 2015, in the 8th day of 2015–16 Serie B season he made his debut as a substitute in an away 3–0 loss from Ternana Calcio. After a rather catastrophic season, the Greek striker is going to use his option clause and ask for the termination of his contract with the club as did not manage to be among the first priorities of Andrea Camplone, playing only in five games.

=== Return to Greece ===
On 24 August 2016, Petropoulos agreed with Apollon Smyrnis till the end of 2016–17 season. On 9 July 2017, newly promoted to Super League club Lamia and Aris are monitoring the case of experienced striker, who is expected to leave his current team soon. On 20 September 2017, he signed a contract with Football League club Doxa Drama for an undisclosed fee. Three months later, he mutually solved his contract with the club. On 6 January 2018, Petropoulos signed with Super League club Platanias for the rest of the 2017–18 season, in order to help with his experience the struggling club to remain in the Super League.

== Career statistics ==
=== Club ===
Club	Season	League	League		Cup		Continental		Other^{1}		Total	
Club	Season	League	Apps	Goals	Apps	Goals	Apps	Goals	Apps	Goals	Apps	Goals
Egaleo	2003–04	Alpha Ethniki	4	0	0	0	0	0	–		4	0
Keratsini	2004–05	Gamma Ethniki	27	5	2	0	–		–		29	5
Haidari	2005–06	Beta Ethniki	25	4	2	1	–		–		27	5
Egaleo	2006–07	Super League Greece	23	4	2	0	–		–		25	4
Panathinaikos	2007–08	Super League Greece	0	0	0	0	0	0	–		0	0
OFI	2007–08	Super League Greece	10	4	2	1	–		–		12	5
Panathinaikos	2008–09	Super League Greece	14	4	2	0	0	0	1	1	17	5
Panathinaikos	2009–10	Super League Greece	6	0	3	0	1	0	–		10	0
Panathinaikos	2010–11	Super League Greece	11	4	1	0	2	0	3	0	17	4
Panathinaikos	2011–12	Super League Greece	12	3	1	0	2	0	2	1	17	4
Panathinaikos	2012–13	Super League Greece	8	1	2	1	4	0	–		14	2
AEK Athens	2012–13	Super League Greece	13	3	0	0	–		–		13	3
Apollon Smyrnis	2013–14	Super League Greece	27	12	2	0	–		–		29	12
OFI	2014–15	Super League Greece	14	2	0	0	–		–		14	2
AEL Kalloni	2014–15	Super League Greece	11	2	0	0	–		–		11	2
Bari	2015–16	Serie B	5	0	0	0	–		–		5	0
Apollon Smyrnis	2016–17	Football League	24	9	1	0	–		–		25	9
Doxa Drama	2017–18	Football League	5	1	0	0	–		–		5	1
Platanias	2017–18	Super League Greece	8	2	0	0	–		–		8	2
Career total			247	60	20	3	9	0	6	2	282	65

^{1}Includes Greek Super League playoffs.
