= Yago Fernández =

Portuguese footballer

Yago
Personal information
- Full name: Yago Fernández Prieto
- Date of birth: 5 January 1988 (age 38)
- Place of birth: Lisbon, Portugal
- Height: 1.92 m (6 ft 4 in)
- Position: Centre-back

Youth career
- 1998–2001: Benfica
- 2001–2002: Sporting CP
- 2002–2005: Real Madrid
- 2005–2007: Valencia

Senior career*
Years	Team	Apps	(Gls)
2007–2008	Valencia B	3	(0)
2008–2010	Espanyol B	36	(0)
2010	→ Gil Vicente (loan)	0	(0)
2010–2011	Malmö FF	23	(4)
2012	Girona	5	(1)
2012–2013	AEK Athens	13	(1)
2013	Häcken	0	(0)
2014	Shakhter Karagandy	9	(1)
2014–2015	Oriental	12	(0)
2015–2016	La Roda	3	(0)
2016–2017	Torre Levante	2	(0)
2017–2018	União Leiria	1	(0)
Total		107	(7)

International career
2003–2004	Portugal U16	4	(0)
2004–2005	Portugal U17	12	(1)
2005–2006	Portugal U18	5	(0)
2006–2007	Portugal U19	8	(0)
2008	Portugal U20	1	(0)
- * Club domestic league appearances and goals

Yago Fernández Prieto (born 5 January 1988), known simply as Yago, is a Portuguese former professional footballer who played as a central defender.

== Club career ==
=== Early career ===
Born in Lisbon to a Spanish father, Yago played for four clubs during his youth career, starting with S.L. Benfica at the age of 9 then successively representing Sporting CP, Real Madrid and Valencia CF. As a senior, his first spell was with the latter's reserve team in the Tercera División, in a promotion-ending campaign.

Subsequently, Yago continued in Spain, spending two years with RCD Espanyol B, helping the side to promote to Segunda División B and being relegated in his second season. In January 2010, he returned to his country for an unassuming loan spell with Gil Vicente F.C. in the Segunda Liga (no appearances whatsoever).

=== Malmö FF ===
In July 2010, after not having his contract renewed by Espanyol, Yago was taken on trial by Swedish club Malmö FF, which had just lost Jasmin Sudić with a ruptured cruciate ligament. He played against Fulham in a 0–0 friendly draw, and his performance earned him a contract for the rest of the year, with the deal being confirmed by manager Roland Nilsson.

On 8 December 2010, shortly after winning the Allsvenskan title, Yago signed a new one-year extension. However, they chose not to offer him a new contract after the 2011 season.

=== AEK Athens ===
In August 2012, following a five-month spell with Girona FC in the Segunda División, during which he scored in a 5–3 home win over Xerez CD, Yago agreed to a three-year contract at AEK Athens FC. He scored his only goal in the Super League Greece on 16 September, opening an eventual 1–1 home draw with Aris Thessaloniki FC.

=== Häcken ===
On 19 August 2013, Yago joined BK Häcken, thus returning to Sweden. In November, after failing to make an appearance, he left the club.

=== Oriental ===
Yago moved to Clube Oriental de Lisboa in early August 2014, following a short stint in Kazakhstan with FC Shakhter Karagandy. He played his first game as a professional in his country on 5 October, featuring the full 90 minutes in the 0–0 home draw against G.D. Chaves.

=== Later career ===
Yago retired in 2018 aged 30, following unassuming spells with Spanish amateurs La Roda CF and CF Torre Levante and Portuguese third-tier side U.D. Leiria.

== International career ==
Yago represented Portugal at youth level.

== Career statistics ==
As of 15 March 2015

Club	Season	League			Cup		League Cup		Continental		Other		Total	
Club	Season	Division	Apps	Goals	Apps	Goals	Apps	Goals	Apps	Goals	Apps	Goals	Apps	Goals
Valencia B	2007–08	Tercera División	3	0	—		—		—		—		3	0
Espanyol B	2008–09	Tercera División	19	0	—		—		—		—		19	0
Espanyol B	2009–10	Segunda División B	17	0	—		—		—		—		17	0
Espanyol B	Total		36	0	—		—		—		—		36	0
Gil Vicente (loan)	2009–10	Segunda Liga	0	0	0	0	0	0	—		—		0	0
Malmö FF	2010	Allsvenskan	10	3	0	0	—		—		—		10	0
Malmö FF	2011	Allsvenskan	13	1	0	0	—		1 (Note: Appearances in UEFA Champions League)	0	1 (Note: Appearances in Svenska Supercupen)	0	15	0
Malmö FF	Total		23	4	0	0	—		1	0	1	0	25	4
Girona	2011–12	Segunda División	5	1	0	0	—		—		—		5	1
AEK Athens	2012–13	Super League Greece	13	1	1	0	—		—		—		14	1
Shakhter Karagandy	2014	Kazakhstan Premier League	9	1	0	0	—		—		1 (Note: Appearances in Kazakhstan Super Cup)	0	10	1
Oriental	2014–15	Segunda Liga	12	0	1	0	1	0	—		—		14	0
Career total			101	7	2	0	1	0	1	0	2	0	107	7

== Honours ==
Malmö FF

- Allsvenskan: 2010
