= Michalis Tsamourlidis =

Greek footballer

Personal information
- Full name: Michail Tsamourlidis
- Date of birth: 22 March 1992 (age 34)
- Place of birth: Tsalka, Georgia
- Height: 1.80 m (5 ft 11 in)
- Position: Left back

Youth career
- 2006–2011: AEK Athens

Senior career*
Years	Team	Apps	(Gls)
2010–2011	AEK Athens	0	(0)
2010	→ Kallithea (loan)	0	(0)
2011–2012	AO Glyfada	6	(0)
2012–2013	AEK Athens	0	(0)
2013	→ Panionios (loan)	1	(0)
2013–2014	A.O. Nea Ionia		
2014–2016	Ethnikos Alexandroupolis		
2014–2016	FSV Schwenningen		
- * Club domestic league appearances and goals as of 3 May 2016

Michalis Tsamourlidis (born 22 March 1992 in Tsalka, Georgia) is a Greek footballer, who last played for FSV Schwenningen in the Bezirksliga Württemberg as a defender.

== Honours ==
AEK Athens

- Greek Cup: 2010–11
