= Alexandros Smyrlis =

Greek footballer

Personal information
- Date of birth: 7 February 1993 (age 33)
- Place of birth: Patras, Greece
- Height: 1.79 m (5 ft 10 in)
- Position: Winger

Team information
- Current team: Diagoras
- Number: 11

Youth career
- Panionios

Senior career*
| Years | Team | Apps | (Gls) |
| 2011–2013 | Panionios | 1 | (0) |
| 2013–2014 | Glyfada | 10 | (2) |
| 2014 | Fostiras | 17 | (4) |
| 2014–2015 | Panionios | 4 | (0) |
| 2015 | Fostiras | 8 | (2) |
| 2015–2018 | Kallithea | 67 | (11) |
| 2018–2019 | Irodotos | 8 | (1) |
| 2019 | Trikala | 12 | (0) |
| 2019–2020 | Ionikos | 13 | (1) |
| 2020– | Diagoras | 25 | (3) |

International career
| 2012 | Greece U19 | 2 | (0) |
- * Club domestic league appearances and goals as of 19 May 2021

Alexandros Smyrlis (Greek: Αλέξανδρος Σμυρλής; born 7 February 1993) is a Greek professional footballer who plays as a winger for Super League 2 club Diagoras.
