= Giannis Arabatzis =

Greek professional footballer (born 1984)

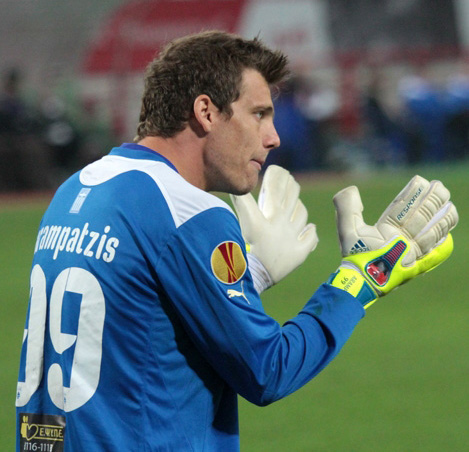

Personal information
- Full name: Ioannis Arabatzis
- Date of birth: 28 May 1984 (age 42)
- Place of birth: Makrochori, Veria, Greece
- Height: 1.92 m (6 ft 4 in)
- Position: Goalkeeper

Youth career
- 1999–2002: Enosi Apostolou Pavlou

Senior career*
Years	Team	Apps	(Gls)
2002–2013	AEK Athens	49	(0)
2013–2014	Ermis Aradippou	31	(0)
2014–2015	Astra Giurgiu	0	(0)
2015–2017	Kerkyra	10	(0)
2017–2019	Ermis Aradippou	46	(0)
2019–2020	Agios Nikolaos		
2020–2021	Kalamata	1	(0)
2021–2022	Nea Artaki		
2022	Charavgiakos		
2022–2024	Agia Paraskevi		

International career
2001–2003	Greece U19	1	(0)
- * Club domestic league appearances and goals as of 9 November 2024

Giannis Arabatzis (Greek: Γιάννης Αραμπατζής; born 28 May 1984) is a Greek professional footballer who played as a goalkeeper.

== Career ==
=== AEK Athens ===
Arabatzis began his career at Enosi Apostolou Pavlou and on 16 June 2002 he was transferred to AEK Athens for a fee of €22,000. In the first seasons at the club he was the third-choice goalkeeper behind players such as Dionysis Chiotis, Chrysostomos Michailidis, Stefano Sorrentino and Jürgen Macho. On 14 May 2008 he made his in the derby against Panathinaikos. In 2011 his performances, earned him a spot in the starting line-up after five years on the bench forcing Sebastian Saja as second choice. In the following season he was also the first choice goalkeeper, leaving Dimitrios Konstantopoulos at the bench. Moreover, he was given the MVP award for his performance against Ergotelis. After the departure of Nikolaos Georgeas, Arabatzis became the oldest player in the club, having completed ten years of service. In the summer of 2013 AEK Athens were relegated to the third division and thus his contract with the club was terminated.

=== Ermis Aradippou ===
On 20 August 2013 Arabatzis signed one-year deal with the Cypriot First Division side, Ermis Aradippou. With his performances he helped the team to participate in the next season's UEFA Europa League Play-Offs.

=== Astra Giurgiu ===
On 23 July 2014 Arabatzis signed a one-year contract with Astra Giurgiu.

=== Kerkyra ===
After an unstable season in Romania, Arabatzis returned to Greece and signed one-year contract with Kerkyra in Football League (Greece Second Division). After some attractive performances he helped Kerkyra to get the promotion in the Super League Greece and thus the club renewed his contract for another year.

=== Second Spell to Ermis Aradippou ===
On 15 September 2017, he returned to his former club Ermis Aradippou.

=== Agios Nikolaos ===
On 29 October 2019, Arabatzis joined Agios Nikolaos.

== Career statistics ==
=== Club ===
As of 15 March 2019

Club	Season	League		Cup		Continental^{[A]}		Others^{[B]}		Total	
Club	Season	Apps	Goals	Apps	Goals	Apps	Goals	Apps	Goals	Apps	Goals
AEK Athens	2007–08	1	0	0	0	0	0	–	–	1	0
AEK Athens	2008–09	0	0	0	0	0	0	–	–	0	0
AEK Athens	2009–10	10	0	0	0	0	0	–	–	10	0
AEK Athens	2010–11	9	0	1	0	2	0	–	–	12	0
AEK Athens	2011–12	21	0	2	0	4	0	–	–	27	0
AEK Athens	2012–13	8	0	2	0	–	–	–	–	10	0
AEK Athens	Total	49	0	5	0	6	0	0	0	60	0
Ermis Aradippou	2013–14	31	0	5	0	-	-	-	-	36	0
Ermis Aradippou	Total	31	0	5	0	0	0	0	0	36	0
Astra Giurgiu	2014–15	0	0	1	0	0	0	0	0	1	0
Astra Giurgiu	Total	0	0	1	0	0	0	0	0	1	0
Kerkyra	2015–16	7	0	3	0	-	-	-	-	10	0
Kerkyra	2016–17	3	0	3	0	-	-	-	-	6	0
Kerkyra	Total	10	0	6	0	0	0	0	0	16	0
Ermis Aradippou	2017–18	31	0	2	0	-	-	–	–	33	0
Ermis Aradippou	2018–19	16	0	1	0	-	-	–	–	17	0
Ermis Aradippou	Total	47	0	3	0	0	0	0	0	50	0
Career total		137	0	20	0	6	0	0	0	163	0

== Honours ==
AEK Athens

- Greek Cup: 2010–11
