= Xenofon Fetsis =

Greek footballer

Fontas Fetsis
Personal information
- Full name: Xenofon Fetsis
- Date of birth: 5 May 1991 (age 35)
- Place of birth: Athens, Greece
- Height: 1.83 m (6 ft 0 in)
- Position: Midfielder

Team information
- Current team: Tilikratis

Youth career
- Panathinaikos

Senior career*
| Years | Team | Apps | (Gls) |
| 2009–2011 | Panathinaikos | 1 | (0) |
| 2011–2013 | AEK Athens | 19 | (1) |
| 2011–2012 | → Glyfada (loan) | 14 | (1) |
| 2013–2014 | Doxa Vyronas | 6 | (0) |
| 2014 | Ethnikos Piraeus | | |
| 2015 | A.E. Kifisia | | |
| 2015–2016 | A.E. Karaiskakis | | |
| 2016–2017 | Anagennisi Karditsa | 7 | (1) |
| 2017 | Langadas | 0 | (0) |
| 2017– | Tilikratis | 0 | (0) |
- Panlefkadios
- * Club domestic league appearances and goals

Xenofon Fetsis (Greek: Ξενοφών Φέτσης; born 5 May 1991) is a Greek footballer, who plays as a midfielder for Tilikratis.

== Career ==
He made his Super League debut on 18 April 2010 with Panthinaikos in a match against PAS Giannina.
