= Pavlos Mitropoulos =

Greek footballer

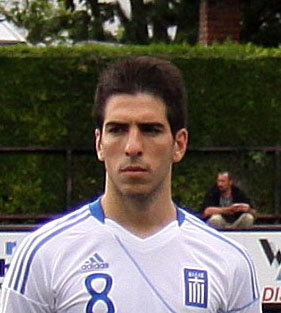

Personal information
- Full name: Pavlos Mitropoulos
- Date of birth: 4 April 1990 (age 36)
- Place of birth: Aigio, Greece
- Height: 1.82 m (6 ft 0 in)
- Position: Defensive midfielder

Team information
- Current team: PAO Rouf

Youth career
- 2007–2008: Panegialios

Senior career*
Years	Team	Apps	(Gls)
2009–2011	Olympiacos Volos	16	(0)
2011–2014	Panetolikos	28	(1)
2012–2013	→ AEK Athens (loan)	14	(0)
2013–2014	→ Panionios (loan)	29	(1)
2014–2016	Panionios	40	(2)
2016	Akropolis	17	(1)
2016–2017	OFI	16	(1)
2017–2019	Levadiakos	48	(2)
2020–	Olympiacos Volos	0	(0)

International career
2011	Greece U21	10	(0)
- * Club domestic league appearances and goals as of 15 June 2019

Pavlos Mitropoulos (Greek: Παύλος Μητρόπουλος; born 4 April 1990) is a Greek professional footballer who plays as a defensive midfielder for Gamma Ethniki club PAO Rouf.

== Career ==
During the 2012/13 season, Pavlos Mitropoulos felt he was receiving recognition as AEK Athens had signed him just four months ago and from the very beginning start to gather compliments. Ewald Lienen had an asset, his teammates called him "pit bull", the club was looking to see how it will give €200.000 to Panetolikos to buy him in the summer and the journalists praised by comparing him with Akis Zikos. The 23-year-old midfielder added in the equation players who admires like Kostas Katsouranis, Ieroklis Stoltidis and Claude Makélélé, while he had the feeling that he was unstoppable. It seemed obvious that his career had taken off!

On 19 April 2013, a Super League disciplinary committee voted to dock AEK three points and award Panthrakikos a 3–0 win, after fans stormed the pitch and chased players from the field during the AEK-Panthrakikos match on 14 April 2013. As a result, AEK were relegated from the Super League to the Football League for the first time in their history. In addition, AEK will start their Football League campaign on minus 2 points. Mitropoulos did not manage to reverse this bad climate from him as most of the fans believed that his third relegation in a row (after Olympiacos Volos and Panetolikos) was an indication of the hoodoo.

On 7 July 2013 Mitropoulos signed to Panionios as a transfer from Panetolikos. He made his debut with the club on 18 August, in a 0–0 away draw against OFI, and scored his first goal in March 2014 in a victorious 4–2 home win against Levadiakos. On 13 May 2014, it was announced that Mitropoulos signed a new three-year contract for Panionios, that keep him in the club until 2017, having agreed with the club since January of the same year.

On 5 March 2016, he signed with Swedish Division 1 club Akropolis on a year contract for an undisclosed fee. Prior to his transfer, he made a contact with Italian Serie B club Ternana Calcio without reached an agreement. On 22 November 2016, almost one-and-a-half month before the January transfer window Mitropoulos signed a contract with OFI util the end of the 2016–17 season, with a renewal clause for an additional year in the club managed to promote in the Super League Greece. On 10 May 2017, he solved his contract with the club. and after two months he signed a two-year contract with Super League Greece club, Levadiakos for an undisclosed fee.
