= Makrochori F.C. =

Makrochori
- Full name: Makrochori Football Club
- Founded: 1950
- Ground: Makrochori Stadium
- Capacity: 500
- League: Football League 2 (Group 2)
- 2014-15: Football League (Group 2) 14th, relegated
- Website: http://www.makrochorifc.gr/

Makrochori F.C. is a Greek football club, based in Makrochori, Imathia. Founded in 1950, It played in season 2013-14 of Football League 2.

== History ==
On March 30, 1950, Doxa was officially recognized by the Court of Veria and Spring 1954 registration by the EPO with the serial number 350. A number that carries so far and the Makrichori F.C., which is the follow-up. Since then and for 58 years Makrochori gives consistently present in all the official football competitions.

1999 and after an eventful match for the championship of the A class, between Doxa and Makrochori Academy, founded by supporters of Doxa to become its subsidiary decided by the presidents of the three groups of Makrochori that at that time competed in the same category (A, current A1), Makis Tsiranidis of Doxa, Sakis Voulgaris of Ethnikos and George Soumpekas of Academy, merging the three groups. The result is the Union Apostle Paul, which is a continuation of Doxa.

In 2013, the team changed name to Makrochori F.C. and it will compete as this in the Football League 2 for the second time for the season 2014-15.
