= Leandro Álvarez =

Argentine footballer

Personal information
- Full name: Leandro Miguel Álvarez
- Date of birth: 4 June 1981 (age 45)
- Place of birth: 25 de Mayo, Argentina
- Height: 1.81 m (5 ft 11 1/2 in)
- Position: Defensive midfielder

Senior career*
Years	Team	Apps	(Gls)
2001	Almagro	13	(3)
2001–2005	San Lorenzo	47	(0)
2005–2006	Tiro Federal	23	(0)
2006–2007	Apollon Limassol	12	(0)
2007–2008	Talleres	17	(0)
2008–2011	Olympiacos Volos	93	(4)
2011–2013	Asteras Tripolis	46	(1)
2013–2014	Apollon Smyrnis	23	(0)
- * Club domestic league appearances and goals as of 2 February 2009

Leandro Miguel Álvarez (born 4 June 1981) is an Argentine footballer.

== Club career ==
Álvarez previously played for San Lorenzo, Tiro Federal and Talleres de Córdoba in the Primera División de Argentina.

=== Olympiacos Volos ===
In 2008, he moved to Olympiacos Volos In 2010–2011 season he helped his team to qualify for the Europa League for the first time in their history and finish fifth in their league. He completed this season having made 31 appearances but he did not manage to score any goal in the league. In summer 2011 he was released, because Olympiacos Volos were relegated to Delta Ethniki for their involvement in the match fixing scandal.

=== Asteras Tripolis ===
Later, he moved to Asteras Tripolis He made his debut against Olympiacos in a 2–0 home win. The next season, he scored his first goal against AEK Athens in a 1–0 away win.
