= Konstantinos Kotsaridis =

Greek footballer

Personal information
- Full name: Konstantinos Kotsaridis
- Date of birth: 12 June 1992 (age 34)
- Place of birth: Thessaloniki, Greece
- Height: 1.77 m (5 ft 10 in)
- Positions: Midfielder; left back

Team information
- Current team: Keravnos Oraiokastro

Youth career
- 2007–2012: Olympiacos

Senior career*
Years	Team	Apps	(Gls)
2010–2012	Olympiacos	0	(0)
2012–2013	AEK Athens	5	(0)
2013–2014	Aris	8	(0)
2014–2015	Niki Volos	14	(0)
2015–2016	K.R.C. Gent-Zeehaven	5	(2)
2016	Ethnikos Neo Agioneri	16	(2)
2016	Panelefsiniakos	4	(0)
2017	Sparta	8	(0)
2017	Digenis Oroklinis	11	(2)
2018	ASIL Lysi	12	(0)
2018–2019	Anagennisi Giannitsa	11	(2)
2019–2020	PAO Koufalia		
2020–2021	Iraklis		
2024–	Keravnos Oraiokastro		

International career
2008–2009	Greece U17	17	(1)
2009–2011	Greece U19	30	(1)
2011–2013	Greece U21	1	(0)
- * Club domestic league appearances and goals as of 14:40, 4 July 2017 (UTC)

Konstantinos Kotsaridis (Greek: Kωνσταντίνος Κοτσαρίδης; born 12 June 1992) is a Greek professional footballer who plays as a defensive midfielder and a left back for Keravnos Oraiokastro.

== Career ==
Kotsaridis started his career το the youth teams of Olympiacos in 2006 becoming captain of the U20 team but failing to appear in the first team although he was a regular member of Greece's U17 and U19 and U21 national teams with 48 caps and 2 goals. He was signed as a free agent by AEK Athens in 2012 and later in January 2013 by Aris.
