= Konstantinos Vlachos =

Greek footballer

Personal information
- Full name: Konstantinos Vlachos
- Date of birth: 6 February 1995 (age 31)
- Place of birth: Athens, Greece
- Height: 1.85 m (6 ft 1 in)
- Position: Centre back

Team information
- Current team: AO Karavas

Youth career
- –2012: AEK Athens
- 2013–2015: Olympiacos

Senior career*
Years	Team	Apps	(Gls)
2012–2013	AEK Athens	0	(0)
2013–2015	Olympiacos	0	(0)
2014–2015	→ Fostiras (loan)	13	(0)
2015–2016	Panionios	11	(0)
2016–2018	Panegialios	32	(0)
2018–2019	Kallithea	?	(?)
2019–2020	Panegialios	?	(?)
2020–2021	AE Moschato	?	(?)
2021–	AO KAravas		

International career
2010	Greece U-17	3	(0)
2013	Greece U-18	2	(0)
2013	Greece U-19	8	(0)
- * Club domestic league appearances and goals as of 12:24, 10 June 2018 (UTC)

Konstantinos Vlachos (Greek: Κωνσταντίνος Βλάχος, born 6 February 1995) is a Greek footballer who plays as a centre back.

== Career ==
On 21 January 2019, Panegialios announced the return of Vlachos, after he had played for a Kallithea since October 2018.
