= Nikos Kourellas =

Greek footballer

Personal information
- Full name: Nikolaos Kourellas
- Date of birth: 22 April 1993 (age 33)
- Place of birth: Grevena, Greece
- Height: 1.73 m (5 ft 8 in)
- Position: Midfielder

Senior career*
Years	Team	Apps	(Gls)
2011–2012	Aris	0	(0)
2012–2013	AEK Athens	4	(0)
2013–2014	Kavala	22	(0)
2014	Evros Soufli	0	(0)
2015	Agrotikos Asteras	3	(0)
2015–2016	Zakynthos	30	(0)
2016–2017	Kissamikos	24	(0)
2017–2018	Kalamata	9	(0)
2018	Iraklis	0	(0)
2018–2019	Katastari	0	(0)
2019–2020	Triglia	22	(0)
- * Club domestic league appearances and goals as of 14:16, 12 August 2020 (UTC)

Nikos Kourellas (Greek: Νίκος Κουρέλλας; born 22 April 1993) is a Greek professional footballer who plays as a midfielder.
