= Apostolos Pavlos =

Apostolos Pavlos Απόστολος Παύλος
- Municipal unit
- Location within the regional unit

- Location within Greece
- Coordinates: 40°33′N 22°15′E
- Country: Greece
- Administrative region: Central Macedonia
- Regional unit: Imathia
- Municipality: Veroia

Area
  - Municipal unit: 64.3 km^{2} (24.8 sq mi)

Population (2021)
  - Municipal unit: 7,994
  - Municipal unit density: 124/km^{2} (322/sq mi)
- Time zone: UTC+2 (EET)
  - Summer (DST): UTC+3 (EEST)
- Vehicle registration: ΗΜ

Apostolos Pavlos (Greek: Απόστολος Παύλος, meaning Paul the Apostle) is a former municipality in Imathia, Greece. Since the 2011 local government reform it is part of the municipality Veroia, of which it is a municipal unit. The municipal unit has an area of 64.252 km^{2}. Population 7,994 (2021). The seat of the municipality was in Makrochori.
