= Dimitrios Anakoglou =

Greek footballer

Personal information
- Date of birth: 6 September 1991 (age 35)
- Place of birth: Serres, Greece
- Height: 1.75 m (5 ft 9 in)
- Position: Midfielder

Team information
- Current team: AEK Athens W.F.C. (head coach)

Senior career*
Years	Team	Apps	(Gls)
2008–2013	Panserraikos	89	(5)
2013–2016	AEK Athens	57	(13)
2016	→ Veria (loan)	10	(2)
2016–2019	Aris	13	(0)
2019–2020	Lamia	0	(0)
2020–2021	Panachaiki	32	(3)
2021–2024	Panserraikos	30	(0)
2024–2026	Marko	24	(0)
2026	Ilisiakos	7	(0)

International career
2009–2010	Greece U19	3	(0)
2010–2013	Greece U21	10	(5)

Managerial career
- 2026: AEK Women (assistant)
- 2026–: AEK Women
- * Club domestic league appearances and goals as of 18 November 2026

Dimitrios Anakoglou (Greek: Δημήτριος Ανάκογλου; born 6 September 1991) is a Greek former professional footballer who played as a midfielder. He is currently the head coach of AEK women's team.

== Career ==
=== Panserraikos ===
Dimitris Anakoglou began his football career in 2008. Within four years and six months, he managed to compete in 89 games scoring 5 times. His good performances led him to play in nine games with the Greece National Team U19 and U21.

=== AEK Athens ===
In January 2013, AEK Athens bought Anakoglou from Panserraikos. Although he was immediately loved by the fans of AEK, he did not play many games; He played in 3 games. After the relegation of the team, he renewed his contract with AEK for 4 years. Anakoglou has been a mainstay in the midfield of AEK during their battle to return to Greece's top flight helping them with back to back promotions from the third tier back to the Super League in just 2 seasons, he also captained the side on many occasions due to the absence of Georgeas and Cordero. From 2015-16 season and the return of AEK at the Super League, Anakoglou became the first captain of the team. On 25 July 2016, AEK Athens terminated the contract of central midfielder and former captain of the club, who had joined the 2016 Greek Cup winners in January 2013.

==== Veria ====
On 1 February 2016, Anakoglou was loaned to Super League side Veria until the end of season. On 7 February 2016, he made his debut with the club, scored in a 2–0 home win against Kalloni helping his club to gain its first victory in 2016.

=== Aris ===
On the 2 August 2016 Anakoglou signed with Aris for 2 years. On 6 April 2017, during club's training workout Anakoglou seriously injured, after a duel with Miguel Sebastián Garcia. A day later, Anakoglou had a surgery, faced a cruciate ligament rupture that probably kept him out of the team for 6 months.

=== Lamia ===
On 4 July 2019, Lamia officially announced the signing of Anakoglou on a free transfer.

== Career statistics ==
As of 1 July 2026

Club	Season	League			Cup		Continental		Other		Total	
Club	Season	Division	Apps	Goals	Apps	Goals	Apps	Goals	Apps	Goals	Apps	Goals
Panserraikos	2008–09	Super League Greece	4	1	2	0	—		—		6	1
Panserraikos	2009–10	Super League Greece 2	23	1	2	0	—		—		25	1
Panserraikos	2010–11	Super League Greece	28	0	2	0	—		—		20	0
Panserraikos	2011–12	Super League Greece 2	28	1	2	0	—		—		30	1
Panserraikos	2012–13	Super League Greece 2	16	2	4	0	—		—		20	2
Panserraikos	Total		89	5	12	0	—		—		101	5
AEK Athens	2012–13	Super League Greece	4	0	0	0	—		—		4	0
AEK Athens	2013–14	Gamma Ethniki	21	9	0	0	—		—		21	9
AEK Athens	2014–15	Super League Greece 2	29	4	8	1	—		—		37	5
AEK Athens	2015–16	Super League Greece	3	0	0	0	—		—		3	0
AEK Athens	Total		57	13	8	1	—		—		65	14
Veria	2015–16	Super League Greece	10	2	0	0	—		—		10	2
Aris	2016–17	Super League Greece 2	13	0	4	0	—		—		17	0
Aris	2017–18	Super League Greece 2	0	0	0	0	—		—		0	0
Aris	2018–19	Super League Greece	0	0	0	0	—		—		0	0
Aris	Total		13	0	4	0	—		—		17	0
Lamia	2019–20	Super League Greece	0	0	2	0	—		—		2	0
Panachaiki	2019–20	Super League Greece 2	8	2	0	0	—		—		8	2
Panachaiki	2020–21	Super League Greece 2	24	1	0	0	—		—		24	1
Panachaiki	Total		32	3	0	0	—		—		32	3
Panserraikos	2021–22	Super League Greece 2	24	0	3	1	—		—		27	1
Panserraikos	2022–23	Super League Greece 2	6	0	5	0	—		—		11	0
Panserraikos	2023–24	Super League Greece	0	0	0	0	—		—		0	0
Panserraikos	Total		30	0	8	1	—		—		38	1
GS Marko	2024-25	Gamma Ethniki	24	0	0	0	—		—		24	0
GS Marko	2025-26	Super League Greece 2	0	0	0	0	—		—		0	0
GS Marko	Total		24	0	0	0	—		—		24	0
Ilisiakos	2025-26	Gamma Ethniki	7	0	0	0	—		1	0	8	0
Career total			262	23	44	2	0	0	1	0	307	25

== Honours ==
AEK Athens

- Football League: 2014–15 (South Group)
- Football League 2: 2013–14 (6th Group)

Panserraikos

- Super League Greece 2: 2022–23 (North Group)

Marko

- Gamma Ethniki: 2024-25 (4th Group)
