= Giannis Karalis =

Greek footballer

Personal information
- Full name: Ioannis Karalis
- Date of birth: 6 November 1988 (age 37)
- Place of birth: Athens, Greece
- Height: 1.78 m (5 ft 10 in)
- Position: Forward

Senior career*
Years	Team	Apps	(Gls)
2007–2011	Atromitos	38	(6)
2012–2013	Kerkyra	21	(2)
2013	AEK Athens	8	(0)
2013–2014	Kallithea	21	(6)
2014–2015	Chania	16	(1)
2015–2016	Lamia	22	(3)
2016	Ergotelis	0	(0)
2016–2017	Ionikos		
2017–2018	Ethnikos Piraeus		
2018	Stylida		
2019	Aspropyrgos		
2019–2020	Thyella Kamari		
2020–2021	Moschato		
2021–2022	Asteras Vari		
2022	P.A.O. Rouf		
2023–2024	Peramaikos		
2024–2025	Lilas Vasiliko		
2025–2026	AEK Chalkida		
- * Club domestic league appearances and goals as of 20:14, 21 February 2014 (UTC)

Giannis Karalis (Greek: Γιάννης Καραλής; born 6 November 1988) is a Greek professional footballer who plays as a forward.
