= Konstantinos Nikolopoulos (footballer, born 1993) =

Greek footballer

Dinos Nikolopoulos
Personal information
- Full name: Konstantinos Nikolopoulos
- Date of birth: 30 November 1993 (age 32)
- Place of birth: Pyrgos, Elis, Greece
- Height: 1.72 m (5 ft 8 in)
- Position: Left back

Team information
- Current team: Apollon Kalythies

Youth career
- –2010: Olympiakos Lampeti
- 2011: Paniliakos
- 2012–2013: AEK Athens

Senior career*
Years	Team	Apps	(Gls)
2010–2011	Olympiakos Lampeti		
2011–2012	Paniliakos	13	(1)
2012–2013	AEK Athens	0	(0)
2013	Zakynthos	7	(0)
2014	Aris Archaia Olympia	7	(1)
2014–2015	Paniliakos	5	(0)
2016–2017	Chania	6	(0)
2017–2019	Paniliakos	41	(0)
2019–2025	AS Rodos	33	(0)
2025–2026	Diagoras		
2026–	Apollon Kalythies		
- * Club domestic league appearances and goals as of 26 June 2021

Konstantinos "Dinos" Nikolopoulos (Greek: Κωνσταντίνος "Ντίνος" Νικολόπουλος; born 30 November 1993) is a Greek professional footballer who plays as a left back for Gamma Ethniki club Apollon Kalythies.

== Career ==
He started his career in 2010–11 season from Olympiakos Lampeti, an amateur football club in Lampeti, Pyrgos, Greece. In July 2011, he was moved to Paniliakos youth ranks. He promoted to the first team on 7 July 2011 at the age of 18. At Paniliakos he made 13 appearances, scoring 1 goal. On 18 August 2012 he moved to AEK Athens to play both for U20 and the first team.
