= Christos Arkoudas =

Greek footballer (born 1990)

Personal information
- Date of birth: 13 June 1990 (age 36)
- Place of birth: Athens, Greece
- Height: 1.82 m (6 ft 0 in)
- Position: Defender

Youth career
- AEK Athens

Senior career*
Years	Team	Apps	(Gls)
2007–2012	Kallithea	49	(1)
2008–2009	→ AO Thiva (loan)	6	(0)
2012–2013	AEK Athens	13	(0)
2013–2014	Atromitos	0	(0)
2014–2015	Lamia	2	(0)
2022–2023	A.E. Mykonos		
- * Club domestic league appearances and goals as of 1 January 2014

Christos Arkoudas (Greek: Χρήστος Αρκούδας; born 13 June 1990) is a Greek professional footballer who plays as a defender.

== Career ==
Arkoudas started his career in the youth departments of AEK Athens and joined in summer 2007 to Kallithea After one year left Kallithea and joined on loan for the 2008/2009 season to Beta Ethniki club AO Thiva. He returned in May 2009 to Kallithea and played for the until June 2012 in 49 matches. On 17 July 2012 returned to his youth club, AEK Athens and signed a four years contract. In November 2013 Arkoudas signed a contract with Super League Greece club Atromitos.

=== Doping case ===
On 8 February 2013 Arkoudas was banned by the HFF after a positive drug test. On 19 February 2013 Arkoudas apologised to the Greek Football Federation and his 3 years ban dropped to a 3 months ban.
