= Dimitrios Grontis =

Greek footballer

Personal information
- Date of birth: 24 August 1994 (age 32)
- Place of birth: Distomo, Boeotia, Greece
- Height: 1.73 m (5 ft 8 in)
- Positions: Midfielder; left back

Team information
- Current team: Ethnikos Piraeus

Youth career
- –2012: AEK Athens

Senior career*
Years	Team	Apps	(Gls)
2012–2016	AEK Athens	45	(5)
2016–2017	Atromitos	12	(0)
2017	Iraklis	15	(1)
2017–2018	AEL	0	(0)
2017–2018	→ Trikala (loan)	25	(0)
2018	Aittitos Spata	10	(1)
2019	Ergotelis	17	(0)
2020	ASIL Lysi	8	(0)
2020–2025	Panionios	93	(27)
2025–	Ethnikos Piraeus	0	(0)

International career
2012	Greece U19	2	(0)
2015	Greece U21	3	(0)
- * Club domestic league appearances and goals as of 15 April 2025

Dimitrios Grontis (Greek: Δημήτριος Γροντής; born 24 August 1994) is a Greek professional footballer who plays as a midfielder for Ethnikos Piraeus.

== Career ==
Grontis began his career at the infrastructure segments of AEK Athens, signing a professional contract with the club in 2012. On 25 August, he made his professional debut against Asteras Tripolis, playing for 81 minutes. Ηe followed the club throughout its decline and its relegation to the Third Division, as well as its rebirth, staying until January 2016, having made a total of 45 appearances for the club.

On 20 January 2016, Grontis moved to fellow Super League side Atromitos, signing a 2,5-year contract. However, in January 2017, his contract was terminated by mutual consent. Three days after his release from Atromitos, Grontis joined Iraklis. On 25 January 2017, he scored his first goal in a crucial 2–0 away win against Veria. His excellent performances helped his team avoid relegation, as Iraklis finished the season with 4 wins in its last 5 games. However, in light of the team's insurmountable financial problems, he was forced to leave the club.

In July 2017, Grontis joined Super League side AEL on a 3-year contract. He was however immediately loaned out to Football League Trikala, and left AEL in the summer of 2018, signing a contract with second-tier club Aittitos Spata. After the first half of the 2018–19 season, Grontis moved to another second-tier club Ergotelis on a free transfer in January 2019.

== Career statistics ==
=== Club ===
As of 24 May 2025

Club	Season	League			Cup		Continental		Other		Total	
Club	Season	Division	Apps	Goals	Apps	Goals	Apps	Goals	Apps	Goals	Apps	Goals
AEK Athens	2012–13	Super League Greece	5	0	2	0	—		—		7	0
AEK Athens	2013–14	Gamma Ethniki	25	1	4	0	—		—		29	1
AEK Athens	2014–15	Super League Greece 2	13	1	2	0	—		—		15	1
AEK Athens	2015–16	Super League Greece	0	0	0	0	—		—		0	0
AEK Athens	Total		43	2	8	0	0	0	—		51	2
Atromitos	2015–16	Superleague Greece	9	0	1	0	—		—		10	0
Atromitos	2016–17	Superleague Greece	1	0	1	0	—		—		2	0
Atromitos	Total		10	0	2	0	0	0	—		12	0
Iraklis	2016–17	Superleague Greece	15	1	0	0	—		—		15	1
Trikala	2017–18	Superleague Greece 2	21	0	4	0	—		—		25	0
Aittitos Spata	2018–18	Superleague Greece 2	10	1	4	1	—		—		14	2
Ergotelis	2018–19	Superleague Greece 2	9	0	2	0	—		—		11	0
Ergotelis	2019–20	Superleague Greece 2	8	0	1	0	—		—		9	0
Ergotelis	Total		17	0	3	0	0	0	—		20	0
ASIL Lysi	2019–20	Cypriot Second Division	8	0	0	0	—		—		8	0
Panionios	2020–21	Gamma Ethniki	10	3	0	0	—		—		10	3
Panionios	2021–22	Gamma Ethniki	17	5	0	0	—		—		17	5
Panionios	2022–23	Gamma Ethniki	25	6	0	0	—		—		25	6
Panionios	2023–24	Gamma Ethniki	28	10	0	0	—		—		28	10
Panionios	2024–25	Superleague Greece 2	13	3	5	1	—		—		18	4
Panionios	Total		93	27	5	1	0	0	0	0	98	28
Career total			217	31	26	2	0	0	0	0	243	33

== Honours ==
AEK Athens

- Football League: 2014–15 (South Group)
- Football League 2: 2013–14 (6th Group)
