= Valentinos Vlachos =

Greek footballer (born 1992)

Personal information
- Date of birth: 14 February 1992 (age 34)
- Place of birth: Athens, Greece
- Height: 1.83 m (6 ft 0 in)
- Position: Right-back

Youth career
- Panathinaikos

Senior career*
Years	Team	Apps	(Gls)
2010–2011	Kavala	1	(0)
2011–2013	AEK Athens	18	(0)
2011–2012	→ Thrasyvoulos (loan)	29	(5)
2013–2015	Club Brugge	0	(0)
2014	→ Aris (loan)	8	(0)
2015–2018	Panionios	82	(0)
2018–2020	Asteras Tripolis	24	(0)
2021	Lamia	11	(0)
2021	Levadiakos	1	(0)
2022	Panionios	3	(0)

International career^{‡}
2010–2011	Greece U19	6	(0)
2013	Greece U21	1	(0)
- * Club domestic league appearances and goals as of 7 November 2021 ‡ National team caps and goals as of 6 February 2013

Valentinos Vlachos (Greek: Βαλεντίνος Βλάχος; born 14 February 1992) is a Greek professional footballer who plays as a right-back.

== Club career ==
Valentinos Vlachos started his professional career in Kavala. In 2011, he signed a three-year contract with Greek giant club AEK Athens. Immediately he signed on a loan from the club with Thrasyvoulos playing in Football League. After a fruitful year in the second league, he returned to AEK Athens playing for the 2012–13 season.

In June 2013, the Greek midfielder Valentinos Vlachos was very interested in the idea of joining Club Brugge due to the bankruptcy of his former club AEK Athens which relegated for first time in its history. After six months, in January 2014, Club Brugge formalized the loan rights for Valentinos Vlachos until the end of the season at Aris. Greek player arrived last summer from AEK Athens as a free transfer. Vlachos is the second Greek player authorized to return home after Spyros Fourlanos, who arrived last May from Panathinaikos. Both players have not played any league match. On 31 December 2014 Valentinos Vlachos signed a one and half years' contract with the Greek side club Panionios.

On 18 May 2018, only details are now remaining for the transfer move of Greek midfielder, who made an excellent season with Panionios, to ambitious Asteras Tripolis. The 26-year-old right midfielder will replace Manolis Bertos in the squad of experienced manager Savvas Pantelidis' team ahead of 2018–19 season. A day later he signed a two years' contract for an undisclosed fee.

== Career statistics ==
=== Club ===
As of 1 March 2022

Club	Season	League			Cup		Continental		Other		Total	
Club	Season	Division	Apps	Goals	Apps	Goals	Apps	Goals	Apps	Goals	Apps	Goals
Kavala	2010–11	Super League Greece	1	0	0	0	—		—		1	0
Thrasyvoulos (loan)	2011–12	Football League	29	5	2	1	—		—		31	6
AEK Athens	2012–13	Super League Greece	18	0	1	0	—		—		19	0
Aris (loan)	2013–14	Super League Greece	8	0	0	0	—		—		8	0
Panionios	2014–15	Super League Greece	1	0	0	0	—		—		1	0
Panionios	2015–16	Super League Greece	26	0	3	0	—		—		29	0
Panionios	2016–17	Super League Greece	31	0	1	0	—		—		32	0
Panionios	2017–18	Super League Greece	24	0	5	0	4	0	—		33	0
Panionios	Total		82	0	9	0	4	0	—		95	0
Asteras Tripolis	2018–19	Super League Greece	18	0	4	0	0	0	—		22	0
Asteras Tripolis	2018–19	Super League Greece	6	0	1	0	0	0	—		7	0
Asteras Tripolis	Total		24	0	5	0	0	0	—		29	0
Lamia	2020–21	Super League Greece	11	0	0	0	0	0	—		11	0
Levadiakos	2021–22	Super League Greece 2	1	0	1	0	0	0	—		2	0
Panionios	2021–22	Gamma Ethniki	1	0	0	0	0	0	—		1	0
Career total			175	5	17	1	4	0	0	0	196	6
