= Makrochori, Imathia =

Makrochori Μακροχώρι
- Community
- Location within Greece
- Coordinates: 40°33′N 22°15′E
- Country: Greece
- Administrative region: Central Macedonia
- Regional unit: Imathia
- Municipality: Veroia
- Municipal unit: Apostolos Pavlos

Population (2021)
  - Community: 4,870
- Time zone: UTC+2 (EET)
  - Summer (DST): UTC+3 (EEST)

Makrochori (Greek: Μακροχώρι) is a town in the municipal unit of Apostolos Pavlos, Imathia, Greece. Since the 2010 local government reform, it is part of the municipality Veroia. It was the seat of the former municipality Apostolos Pavlos between 1997 and 2010. In 2021 its population was 4,870. It is situated 5 km northeast of the city centre of Veroia.

== See also ==
- List of settlements in Imathia
