= CF Torre Levante =

Spanish football team

Torre Levante
- Full name: Club de Fútbol Torre Levante Orriols
- Founded: 1976
- Ground: Municipal de Orriols, Valencia, Spain
- Capacity: 2,000
- Chairman: Ramón Calvo
- Manager: Ximo Enguix
- 2021–22: Regional Preferente – Group 2, 15th of 16 (relegated)
- Website: www.cftlo.com
Home colours	Away colours

Club de Fútbol Torre Levante Orriols is a Spanish football team based in Valencia, in the Valencian Community. Founded in 1976, it is mainly focused on youth football, holding home games at Campo Municipal de Orriols, which has a capacity of 2,000 spectators.

== Season to season ==
Season	Tier	Division	Place	Copa del Rey
1976–77	8	3ª Reg.		
1977–78	8	3ª Reg.		
1978–79	8	3ª Reg.		
1979–80	8	3ª Reg.	4th	
1980–81	8	3ª Reg.	4th	
1981–82	8	3ª Reg.	5th	
1982–83	8	3ª Reg.	10th	
1983–84	7	2ª Reg.	11th	
1984–85	7	2ª Reg.	5th	
1985–86	7	2ª Reg.	7th	
1986–87	7	2ª Reg.	8th	
1987–88	7	2ª Reg.	4th	
1988–89	7	2ª Reg.	3rd	
1989–90	7	2ª Reg.	3rd	
1990–91	6	1ª Reg.	11th	
1991–92	6	1ª Reg.	10th	
1992–93	6	1ª Reg.	7th	
1993–94	6	1ª Reg.	7th	
1994–95	6	1ª Reg.	1st	
1995–96	5	Reg. Pref.	14th	

Season	Tier	Division	Place	Copa del Rey
1996–97	5	Reg. Pref.	18th	
1997–98	5	Reg. Pref.	7th	
1998–99	5	Reg. Pref.	11th	
1999–2000	5	Reg. Pref.	9th	
2000–01	5	Reg. Pref.	17th	
2001–02	6	1ª Reg.	5th	
2002–03	6	1ª Reg.	1st	
2003–04	5	Reg. Pref.	11th	
2004–05	5	Reg. Pref.	5th	
2005–06	5	Reg. Pref.	10th	
2006–07	5	Reg. Pref.	6th	
2007–08	5	Reg. Pref.	4th	
2008–09	5	Reg. Pref.	5th	
2009–10	5	Reg. Pref.	5th	
2010–11	5	Reg. Pref.	5th	
2011–12	5	Reg. Pref.	2nd	
2012–13	5	Reg. Pref.	3rd	
2013–14	4	3ª	16th	
2014–15	4	3ª	13th	
2015–16	4	3ª	9th	

Season	Tier	Division	Place	Copa del Rey
2016–17	4	3ª	9th	
2017–18	4	3ª	6th	
2018–19	4	3ª	19th	
2019–20	5	Reg. Pref.	10th	
2020–21	5	Reg. Pref.	11th	
2021–22	6	Reg. Pref.	15th	
2022–2026	DNP			

- 6 seasons in Tercera División
