= Theodoros Moschonas =

Greek footballer

Thodoris Moschonas
Personal information
- Full name: Theodoros Moschonas
- Date of birth: 3 December 1990 (age 35)
- Place of birth: Athens, Greece
- Height: 1.96 m (6 ft 5 in)
- Position: Goalkeeper

Youth career
- 2007–2009: AEK Athens

Senior career*
| Years | Team | Apps | (Gls) |
| 2009–2013 | AEK Athens | 0 | (0) |
| 2010 | → Elpidoforos (loan) | 15 | (0) |
| 2013–2014 | Fostiras | 23 | (0) |
| 2014–2017 | Levadiakos | 8 | (0) |
| 2014–2015 | → Kallithea (loan) | 16 | (0) |
- * Club domestic league appearances and goals as of 29 July 2017

Theodoros Moschonas (Greek: Θεόδωρος Μοσχονάς, born 3 December 1990) is a Greek former football goalkeeper.

== Career ==
Moschonas began playing professional football with AEK Athens in 2009. On 1 January 2010, he was loaned to Elpidoforos for the rest of the season. In 2013, AEK were relegated and Moschonas left the club on a free transfer. On 7 August 2013, he signed for newly promoted Fostiras in the Football League. In July 2014, he signed for Levadiakos in the Super League.
