= Miguel Ángel Cordero =

Spanish footballer (born 1987)

Personal information
- Full name: Miguel Ángel Cordero Sánchez
- Date of birth: 10 September 1987 (age 39)
- Place of birth: Lebrija, Spain
- Height: 1.78 m (5 ft 10 in)
- Position: Defensive midfielder

Youth career
- 1995–2000: Antoniano
- 2000–2006: Sevilla

Senior career*
Years	Team	Apps	(Gls)
2006–2010	Sevilla B	79	(1)
2009–2010	→ Real Madrid B (loan)	25	(0)
2010–2012	Xerez	68	(6)
2012–2016	AEK Athens	80	(1)
2016–2017	Gimnàstic	17	(1)
2017–2020	Cartagena	90	(2)
2021–2023	Atlético Baleares	58	(0)
2023–2024	Atlético Sanluqueño	11	(0)
- * Club domestic league appearances and goals as of 01:42, 23 May 2024 (UTC)

Miguel Ángel Cordero Sánchez (born 10 September 1987) is a Spanish professional footballer who plays as a defensive midfielder.

== Club career ==
Born in Lebrija, Province of Seville, Cordero arrived at Sevilla FC's youth ranks at the age of 12 from local CA Antoniano. In 2006 he moved to Sevilla Atlético, helping Sevilla FC's reserves to achieve promotion to Segunda División.

After totalling 45 matches with Sevilla B the following two seasons – suffering relegation in his second – and some call-ups to the first team, although he never appeared officially for the Andalusians, Cordero was loaned to another side in the third tier, Real Madrid Castilla. In August 2010 he signed with Xerez CD, returning to his native region.

In his first season, Cordero was one of the most used players by manager Javi López (almost 2,900 minutes of action), scoring five goals as Xerez easily retained their status. He also collected 15 yellow cards.

Cordero joined AEK Athens F.C. in the summer of 2012, going on to remain several years in Greece and help to two consecutive promotions to reach the Super League after they were relegated twice in the same campaign due to irregularities. On 25 June 2016, however, as his contract was nearing its expiration, he was told by the board of directors to look for a new club.

On 30 August 2016, Cordero signed a one-year deal with Gimnàstic de Tarragona of the Spanish second division. After featuring sparingly, he moved to the level below with FC Cartagena the following 1 August.

Cordero helped the Efesé to promote to division two in 2020, contributing 21 games to this feat. On 29 December 2020, already a fringe player, the 33-year-old terminated his contract with the club and joined third-tier side CD Atlético Baleares just hours later.

== Career statistics ==
As of 13 May 2024

Club	Season	League			Cup^{1}		Europe		Other		Total	
Club	Season	Division	Apps	Goals	Apps	Goals	Apps	Goals	Apps	Goals	Apps	Goals
Sevilla B	2005–06	Segunda División B	2	0	—		—		—		2	0
Sevilla B	2006–07	Segunda División B	28	1	—		—		4 (Note: Appearances in Segunda División B promotion play-offs)	0	32	1
Sevilla B	2007–08	Segunda División	14	0	—		—		—		14	0
Sevilla B	2008–09	Segunda División	31	0	—		—		—		31	0
Sevilla B	Total		75	1	—		—		4	0	79	1
Real Madrid B (loan)	2009–10	Segunda División B	25	0	—		—		—		25	0
Xerez	2010–11	Segunda División	37	5	1	1	—		—		38	6
Xerez	2011–12	Segunda División	29	1	1	0	—		—		30	1
Xerez	2012–13	Segunda División	2	0	0	0	—		—		2	0
Xerez	Total		68	6	2	1	—		—		70	7
AEK Athens	2012–13	Super League Greece	23	0	0	0	—		—		23	0
AEK Athens	2013–14	Gamma Ethniki	24	1	4	0	—		—		28	1
AEK Athens	2014–15	Super League Greece 2	16	0	3	1	—		—		19	1
AEK Athens	2015–16	Super League Greece	17	0	7	0	—		—		24	0
AEK Athens	Total		80	1	14	1	—		—		94	2
Gimnàstic	2016–17	Segunda División	17	1	3	0	—		—		20	1
Cartagena	2017–18	Segunda División B	25	0	3	0	—		4	0	32	0
Cartagena	2018–19	Segunda División B	33	1	2	0	—		4	1	39	2
Cartagena	2019–20	Segunda División B	20	0	2	0	—		1	0	23	0
Cartagena	2020–21	Segunda División	3	0	0	0	—		—		3	0
Cartagena	Total		81	1	7	0	—		9	1	97	2
Atlético Baleares	2020–21	Segunda División B	14	0	—		—		—		14	0
Atlético Baleares	2021–22	Primera División RFEF	21	0	3	0	—		—		24	0
Atlético Baleares	2022–23	Primera Federación	23	0	1	0	—		—		24	0
Atlético Baleares	Total		58	0	4	0	—		—		62	0
Atlético Sanluqueño	2023–24	Primera Federación	11	0	1	0	—		—		12	0
Career total			415	10	31	2	0	0	13	1	459	13

^{1}Includes two appearances in the semi-professional Gamma Ethniki Cup

== Honours ==
Sevilla B

- Segunda División B: 2006–07

AEK

- Greek Football Cup: 2015–16
- Gamma Ethniki: 2013–14 (Group VI)
- Football League Greece: 2014–15 (South Group)
