= Anastasios Tsoumagas =

Greek footballer

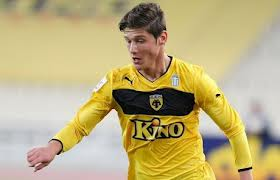

Personal information
- Date of birth: 22 March 1991 (age 35)
- Place of birth: Edessa, Greece
- Height: 1.75 m (5 ft 9 in)
- Position: Left-back

Team information
- Current team: Asi Gonia

Youth career
- –2009: Edessaikos
- 2009–2010: Asteras Tripolis

Senior career*
| Years | Team | Apps | (Gls) |
| 2010–2012 | Asteras Tripolis | 1 | (0) |
| 2010–2011 | → Zakynthos (loan) | 18 | (0) |
| 2012–2013 | Leixões | 12 | (0) |
| 2013–2014 | AEK Athens | 24 | (0) |
| 2014–2015 | Panelefsiniakos | 8 | (1) |
| 2015 | Pierikos | 8 | (0) |
| 2015–2016 | Vianense | 7 | (0) |
| 2016 | Neves | 11 | (0) |
| 2016 | Ergotelis | 9 | (1) |
| 2017 | Irodotos | 0 | (0) |
| 2017 | Ialysos | 0 | (0) |
| 2017–2018 | Edessaikos | | |
| 2020–2022 | Aris Rethymno | | |
| 2022– | Asi Gonia | | |
- * Club domestic league appearances and goals as of 10:52, 1 October 2015 (UTC)

Anastasios Tsoumagas (Greek: Αναστάσιος Τσουμάγκας; born 22 March 1991) is a Greek professional footballer who plays as a left-back.

== Career ==
Tsoumagas started his career with his local side Edessaikos when he was 17 years old. Although he did not play for the club's men's team, he attracted many scouters with his talent, and in 2009, Super League side Asteras Tripolis signed him for their U-20 squad. After promoting him from the youth squad to the men's outfit in 2010, Asteras Tripolis immediately loaned Tsoumagas to Gamma Ethniki side Zakynthos on a season-long deal. During his loan spell with Zakynthos, Tsoumagas played in 18 matches. After his loan spell ended, he managed to play one game with Asteras Tripolis during the 2011–2012 season, and was subsequently released from his contract at the end of the season.

In 2012, Tsoumagas moved to Portugal and signed with LigaPro side Leixões. He featured in 16 games during the first half of the season for the Portuguese club, before moving to struggling Greek giants AEK Athens in January 2013, as a free agent. During a 5-month stay in Athens, Tsoumagas featured in 13 Super League matches. After the club's relegation to the 3rd Division due to financial issues and attempt at a restart, Tsoumagas renewed his contract for the next four years. He played with AEK Athens in the Gamma Ethniki and helped the club achieve an easy 1st-place finish in the 6th group. His contract was subsequently terminated on 2 June 2014. Tsoumagas went on to play for fellow Gamma Ethniki side Panelefsiniakos, where he featured in 8 matches and scored one goal, before moving to the 2nd division and signing for Pierikos.

In August 2015, Tsoumagas returned to Portugal signing for Campeonato de Portugal side Vianense. On 3 July 2016 Tsoumagas once again returned to Greece, signing a contract with Gamma Ethniki side Ergotelis. He terminated his contract with the club on mutual consent on 23 December 2016.

== Honours ==
AEK Athens

- Football League 2: 2013–14 (6th Group)
