= Michalis Pavlis =

Greek footballer and manager

Personal information
- Full name: Michail Pavlis
- Date of birth: 29 September 1989 (age 37)
- Place of birth: Mytilene, Greece
- Height: 1.72 m (5 ft 8 in)
- Position: Striker

Youth career
- –2005: Aetos Loutron
- 2005–2007: AEK Athens

Senior career*
Years	Team	Apps	(Gls)
2007–2011	AEK Athens	25	(2)
2010	→ Ethnikos Asteras (loan)	9	(0)
2011	Elpidoforos	6	(2)
2011–2012	Kavala	15	(11)
2012–2014	AEK Athens	15	(2)

International career^{‡}
2006–2008	Greece U19	17	(10)
2008–2010	Greece U21	6	(1)

Managerial career
- 2014–2015: AEK Athens U17 (assistant)
- 2015–2017: AEK Athens U10
- 2017–2019: AEK Athens U12
- 2019–2021: AEK Athens U13
- 2021–2024: AEK Athens B (assistant)
- * Club domestic league appearances and goals as of 21-04–2013 ‡ National team caps and goals as of 30-05–2008

Michalis Pavlis (Greek: Μιχάλης Παυλής; born 29 September 1989) is a Greek former professional footballer who played as a striker.

== Club career ==
=== Early career ===
Pavlis started football on his regional team in Mytilene called Aetos Loutron, where he was located by Toni Savevski, who brought him to AEK Athens, the team that he supported as a child. He started from the infrastructure departments of the club and in the period 2006-07 he became the top scorer of the Youth team.

=== AEK Athens ===
On 3 September 2007, Pavlis made his debut against Sevilla in the second leg of the UEFA Champions League 3rd qualifying round. Pavlis played for 30 minutes, in his time on the pitch he won a penalty. During the 2007–08 season, Pavlis went on to make his league debut for AEK, and scored his first senior goal against Veria on 12 January. He ended his first senior season with 6 appearances in total scoring 1 goal. His second season was even better making 15 appearances in total scoring twice. His first goal of the season was a 30-yard strike in AEK's UEFA Cup Second qualifying round qualifier against Omonia. In May 2010 he was diagnosed with a problem multiple sclerosis. In August 2010 it was agreed to be granted initially in the form of a loan to AO Trikala in order to receive participation time, something that would be very difficult for AEK. His move to the Thessalian team, although initially agreed and announced (he participated in 2 friendly matches), but finally was cancelled, to then agree as a free agent (as his contract with AEK Athens was not renewed), at Ethnikos Asteras, where he played for six months. In January 2011, Pavlis signed with Elpidoforos to play in the fourth tier of Greek football, while at the beginning of the following year, he joined Kavala. In the summer of 2012, Pavlis returned to AEK Athens to help his childhood club, which was struggling financially, remain in Super League. He played in 13 matches scoring 2 goals. AEK Athens finished 15th and were relegated to Football League, but AEK became an amateur club preferring instead, to self-relegate and participate in Football League 2 and start from scratch. On 3 June 2013, Pavlis made an amateur contract to continue playing for his beloved club and help AEK Athens in their effort to return at the top tier.

=== Retirement ===
On 2 January 2014, Pavlis announced his retirement from professional football, at the young age of 24, as his struggle with multiple sclerosis couldn't allow him continue playing football.

== International career ==
Pavlis was first called up to the Greece national under-19 football team in 2006. Since then, he has made 15 appearances and scored 7 goals. Pavlis was a key figure in the national team qualifying for the 2008 UEFA European Under-19 Football Championship, scoring 6 goals including a hat-trick against Luxembourg.

== Managerial career ==
After his retirement Pavlis became the Assistant Coach of AEK Athens U17. Since 2015 he coaches AEK Athens U10. Pavlis is a UEFA C License holder.

== Career statistics ==
As of 22 April 2013

Club performance			League		Cup		Continental		Total	
Season	Club	League	Apps	Goals	Apps	Goals	Apps	Goals	Apps	Goals
Greece			League		Greek Cup		Europe		Total	
2007–08	AEK Athens	Super League	7	1	0	0	1	0	8	1
2008–09	AEK Athens	Super League	10	1	3	0	2	1	15	2
2009–10	AEK Athens	Super League	8	0	1	0	1	0	10	0
2010	Ethnikos Asteras (loan)	Football League	9	0	2	1	-	-	11	1
2011	Elpidoforos	Delta Ethniki	6	2	0	0	-	-	6	2
2011–12	Kavala	Delta Ethniki	15	11	0	0	-	-	15	11
2012–13	AEK Athens	Super League	13	2	2	0	-	-	15	2
2013–14	AEK Athens	Football League 2	2	0	1	0	-	-	3	0
Total	AEK		40	4	7	0	4	1	51	5
Total	Greece		70	17	9	1	4	1	83	19
Career total			70	17	9	1	4	1	83	19

== Records ==
- Pavlis is the youngest player of AEK Athens to compete in a European competition.
- He is also the youngest Greek player to have won a penalty in a European competition.
