= A.O. Glyfada =

Greek football club

- Full name: Athlitikos Omilos Glyfadas
- Nickname: Efoplistes (Shipowners)
- Founded: 1976; 50 years ago
- Ground: Elliniko Stadium
- League: Athens FCA Second Division
- 2025–26: Athens FCA Third Division (Group 2), 2nd (promoted)
- Website: www.glyfadafc.gr
Home colours	Away colours

Athlitikos Omilos Glyfadas (Greek: Α.Ο. Γλυφάδας), formerly Keravnos Glyfada, is a Greek football club, based in Glyfada, Athens, currently competing in the second category of the EPS Athens (Ε.Π.Σ. Αθηνών) championship.

== History ==
The association was founded, according to the old club logo, in 1976, as Keravnos Glyfada. The new logo of the association shows as year of foundation 1926, without any explanation.

In the summer of 2009 the management of the club, under George Kalogeropoulos, accounted the Themostokli Egaleo that had financial troubles and the 2008–09 season fought in Delta Ethniki. So the Keravnos promoted to regional championship taking the place of Themistocles and projecting as a name abbreviated as "PAOK Glyfada". In the new emblem of the association as marked, founded in 1926. In his first season in the W. National Keravnos finished in fourth position. The second year won the title in speech and climbed to the Triti Ethniki for the first time in history.

In 2011, they promoted to Football League 2 and renamed to A.O. Glyfada. The move was made after a referendum did the club among fans, who "demanded" the rename in order to be more available to the municipality with the new name.

In 2012–2013 season the team played in the first Group of Football League 2 and came 9th with 8 wins, 10 draws and 6 losses; they were promoted to the Football League. In 2013–2014 season the team played in the South Group of Football League and came 13th with 2 wins, 3 draws and 21 losses; they were relegated to Gamma Ethniki. In 2014–2015 season they played in the 4th group of Gamma Ethniki and came seventh with 10 wins, 4 draws and 12 losses. In 2015–2016 season the team played in the 4th group of Gamma Ethniki and came 15th with 3 wins, 4 draws and 23 losses; they were relegated to the EPS championship. In 2016–2017 season they played in the first group of the first category of the EPS Athens (Ε.Π.Σ. Αθηνών) championship and came 16th with 2 wins, 5 draws and 23 losses; they were relegated to the second category of this championship. In 2017–2018 season the team play in the third group of the second category of the EPS Athens (Ε.Π.Σ. Αθηνών) championship and after 14 games they are 11th with 5 wins, 1 draw and 8 losses.

== Crest history ==
Logo of team from 1976 until 2009

Logo of team from 2009 until 2011

Logo of team from 2011 until 2014
