= 2015–16 AEK Athens F.C. season =

AEK Athens
2015–16 season
- Chairman: Evangelos Aslanidis
- Manager: Traianos Dellas (until 20 October); Stelios Manolas (interim, until 28 October); Gus Poyet (until 19 April); Stelios Manolas
- Stadium: Athens Olympic Stadium
- Super League: 4th (After play-offs); 3rd (Regular season)
- Greek Cup: Winners
- Top goalscorer: League: Ronald Vargas; Christos Aravidis (9 each); All: Ronald Vargas; Diego Buonanotte; Christos Aravidis (11 each)
- Highest home attendance: 31,121 (vs Olympiacos) (13 February 2016)
- Lowest home attendance: 2,160 (vs Panelefsiniakos) (2 December 2015)
- Average home league attendance: 11,150
- Biggest win: AEK Athens 6–0 Panelefsiniakos
- Biggest defeat: Olympiacos 4–0 AEK Athens
Home colours	Away colours	Third colours

The 2015–16 season was the 92nd season in the existence of AEK Athens F.C. and the 55th season in the top flight of Greek football. They competed in the Super League and the Greek Cup. The season began on 22 August 2015 and finished on 31 May 2016.

== Kits ==
Supplier: Nike
Sponsor(s): Pame stoixima
Features: LG Corp

Home	Away	Third	Friendlies

== Overview ==
AEK Athens finally returned in Super League after 2 years of absence. The team experienced radical changes over the summer. The major signings were André Simões from Moreirense, Rodrigo Galo, Venezuela internationals, Ronald Vargas and Alain Baroja as a loan from Caracas, Dídac Vilà from Milan and Diego Buonanotte, who hundreds of AEK fans welcomed at the airport. The transfers also included the return of Rafik Djebbour after 4 years.

AEK started the championship well, but after a 4–0 defeat from Olympiacos on 20 October, Traianos Dellas resigned as coach after 2 and a half years at the team's bench, with the U20 coach, Stelios Manolas taking over as an interim coach, until a new coach was found. On 29 October, the Uruguayan Gus Poyet reached an agreement with the club and on 30 October signed a contract until the summer with renewal option for two years, a discussion that would take place towards the end of the period. Poyet managed to change the atmosphere within the team and lead the club to an unbeaten streak spanning from the start of 2016 until February. The team picked up 3 important derby wins against PAOK, Panathinaikos and Olympiacos at home all by 1–0 win, with Vargas being the scorer. After a defeat against Atromitos at Peristeri Stadium incidents occurred between the fans. That resulted in the team to be punished with a 3-point deduction and combined with the defeats that AEK suffered in the away games of the final matchdays, resulted in losing the second place and eventually finishing 3rd in the league. Even though the team's well performance, on 19 April Poyet was sacked, due to conflicts with Dimitris Melissanidis, mainly focusing the club's ambitions and budget.

In the cup, AEK easily passed through their respective group finishing first and eliminated Levadiakos for the round of 16 and Iraklis for the quarter-finals, winning all their games. In the semi-finals they faced Atromitos and with Manolas who had replaced Poyet and was appointed as interim coach until the end of the season, they qualified for the cup final, with a 1–0 at home and 1–1 away from home. On 17 May at the Olympic Stadium, AEK made clear of their strong comeback, as they beat the champion Olympiacos by 2–1 for the second time within 3 months and lifted the trophy for 15th time in their history. The same night, celebrations were organised at Nea Filadelfeia by fans, who celebrated with the players and staff.

After the conquest of the cup, Manolas did not sit on the bench of the team again due to overwork, with his assistant, Nikos Panagiotaras sitting in his place. In the play-offs the team did not capitalise on their form in the cup and facing the fatigue that was built up, achieved a 3rd-place finish, thus qualifying for the 3rd qualifying round in the next season's UEFA Europa League.

== Management team ==
Position	Staff
Manager	(Greece) Stelios Manolas
Assistant manager	(Greece) Nikos Panagiotaras
Goalkeeping coach	(Greece) Kostas Kampolis
Fitness coach	(Cyprus) Michael Michalis
Technical director	(Serbia) Branko Milovanović
Executive director	(Bosnia and Herzegovina) Dušan Bajević
Academy director	(Greece) Michalis Mitrotasios
U17 Manager	(Greece) Markos Dimos
Head of Scouting	(Greece) Michalis Kasapis
Head of Medical	(Greece) Lakis Nikolaou

- Source: aekfc.gr

== Players ==
=== Squad information ===
NOTE: The players are the ones that have been announced by the AEK Athens' press release. No edits should be made unless a player arrival or exit is announced. Updated 31 May 2016, 23:59 UTC+3.

No.	Player	Nat.	Position(s)	Date of birth (Age)	Signed	Previous club	Transfer fee	Contract until
Goalkeepers
1	Alain Baroja	(Venezuela)	GK	23 October 1989 (aged 26)	2015	(Venezuela) Caracas	Free	2016
13	Panagiotis Dounis	(Greece)	GK	29 March 1997 (aged 19)	2013	(Greece) AEK Athens U20	—	2017
16	Ilias Vouras	(Greece)	GK	20 February 1988 (aged 28)	2013	(Greece) Niki Volos	Free	2017
22	Giannis Anestis	(Greece)	GK	9 March 1991 (aged 25)	2014	(Greece) Panionios	Free	2018
—	Fotis Karagiolidis	(Greece)	GK	28 August 1987 (aged 28)	2013	(Greece) Atromitos	Free	2016
Defenders
2	Aristidis Soiledis	(Greece)	LB / LM / LW	8 February 1991 (aged 25)	2014	(Greece) Niki Volos	Free	2017
4	César Arzo	(Spain)	CB / DM	21 January 1986 (aged 30)	2015	(Israel) Beitar Jerusalem	Free	2018
5	Vasilios Lampropoulos	(Greece)	CB / RB	31 March 1990 (aged 26)	2014	(Greece) Panionios	Free	2017
12	Rodrigo Galo	(Brazil)	RB / RM / RW / LB	19 September 1986 (aged 29)	2015	(Portugal) Paços de Ferreira	Free	2017
15	Stratos Svarnas	(Greece)	CB / RB	11 November 1997 (aged 18)	2014	(Greece) Triglia Rafinas	Free	2017
23	Dídac Vilà	(Spain)	LB / LM	9 June 1989 (aged 27)	2015	(Italy) Milan	Free	2018
26	Dimitrios Kolovetsios (Vice-captain 3)	(Greece)	CB / RB	16 October 1991 (aged 24)	2014	(Greece) PAS Giannina	€250,000	2017
27	Michalis Bakakis	(Greece)	RB / LB / CB / RM	18 March 1991 (aged 25)	2014	(Greece) Panetolikos	€250,000	2017
28	Alkis Markopouliotis	(Greece)	CB	13 August 1996 (aged 19)	2015	(Greece) AEK Athens U20	—	2019
55	Adam Tzanetopoulos	(Greece)	CB / DM / CM	10 February 1995 (aged 21)	2013	(Greece) Niki Volos	Free	2020
Midfielders
6	Miguel Cordero	(Spain)	CM / DM	10 September 1987 (aged 28)	2012	(Spain) Xerez	€70,000	2017
8	André Simões	(Portugal)	DM / CM	16 December 1989 (aged 26)	2015	(Portugal) Moreirense	Free	2019
18	Jakob Johansson (Vice-captain 2)	(Sweden)	DM / CM / CB	21 January 1990 (aged 26)	2014	(Sweden) Göteborg	Free	2018
20	Petros Mantalos (Captain)	(Greece)	AM / LM / CM / LW / SS / RM / RW	31 August 1991 (aged 24)	2014	(Greece) Skoda Xanthi	€500,000	2019
25	Konstantinos Galanopoulos	(Greece)	CM / DM	28 December 1997 (aged 18)	2015	(Greece) AEK Athens U20	—	2018
30	Diego Buonanotte	(Argentina)	AM / RM / LM / SS / RW / LW	19 April 1988 (aged 28)	2015	(Spain) Granada	Free	2017
36	Bruno Zuculini	(Argentina)	DM / CM	2 April 1993 (aged 23)	2016	(England) Manchester City	Free	2016
77	Stavros Vasilantonopoulos	(Greece)	RM / RB / LM / DM	28 January 1992 (aged 24)	2015	(Greece) Apollon Smyrnis	Free	2018
Forwards
7	Hélder Barbosa	(Portugal)	LW / LM / AM / RW / RM / SS	25 May 1987 (aged 29)	2014	(Portugal) Braga	Free	2017
9	Ronald Vargas	(Venezuela)	SS / AM / ST / LW / RM / LM	18 July 1986 (aged 29)	2015	(Turkey) Balıkesirspor	Free	2017
11	Vangelis Platellas	(Greece)	RW / RM / LM / LW / SS / AM	1 December 1988 (aged 27)	2013	(Greece) Skoda Xanthi	Free	2016
14	Tomáš Pekhart	(Czech Republic)	ST	26 May 1989 (aged 27)	2016	(Germany) Ingolstadt 04	Free	2017
19	Rafik Djebbour	(Algeria) (France)	ST / SS / RW / LW	8 March 1984 (aged 32)	2015	(Cyprus) APOEL	Free	2016
21	Christos Aravidis (Vice-captain)	(Greece)	SS / ST / RW / LW / RM / LM	13 March 1987 (aged 29)	2014	(Greece) Panionios	Free	2017
24	Andreas Vlachomitros	(Greece)	SS / ST / RW / LW	3 July 1997 (aged 18)	2015	(Greece) AEK Athens U20	—	2019
33	Ivan Brečević	(Croatia)	ST	28 July 1987 (aged 28)	2013	(Slovenia) Koper	Free	2016
81	Antonis Kyriazis	(Greece)	RW / LW / RM / LM	14 April 1997 (aged 19)	2015	(Greece) AEK Athens U20	—	2018
99	Macauley Chrisantus	(Nigeria)	ST/ SS / RW / LW	20 August 1990 (aged 25)	2015	(Turkey) Sivasspor	Free	2016
Left during Winter Transfer Window
3	Stavros Petavrakis	(Greece)	LB / LM	9 November 1992 (aged 23)	2013	(Greece) Fostiras	Free	2017
10	Dimitrios Anakoglou	(Greece)	AM / CM / RM / LM	6 September 1991 (aged 24)	2013	(Greece) Panserraikos	€50,000	2016
29	Kyriakos Andreopoulos	(Greece)	DM / CM	18 January 1994 (aged 22)	2015	(Greece) Kerkyra	€160,000	2018
44	Ablaye Faye	(Senegal)	DM / CM	10 April 1994 (aged 22)	2014	(Greece) Kallithea	Free	2017
—	Dimitrios Grontis	(Greece)	CM / AM / LM / RM / LW / RW	21 August 1994 (aged 21)	2012	(Greece) AEK Athens U20	—	2016

== Transfers ==
=== In ===
==== Summer ====
No.	Pos.	Player	From	Fee	Date	Contract Until	Source
4	DF	(Spain) César Arzo	(Israel) Beitar Jerusalem	Free transfer	1 July 2015	30 June 2017	
8	MF	(Portugal) André Simões	(Portugal) Moreirense	Free transfer	1 July 2015	30 June 2017	
9	FW	(Venezuela) Ronald Vargas	(Turkey) Balıkesirspor	Free transfer	3 July 2015	30 June 2017	
12	DF	(Brazil) Rodrigo Galo	(Portugal) Paços de Ferreira	Free transfer	1 July 2015	30 June 2017	
16	FW	(Greece) Vasilios Tsevas	(Greece) Iraklis Psachna	Loan return	1 July 2015	30 June 2017	
19	FW	(Algeria) Rafik Djebbour	(Cyprus) APOEL	Free transfer	1 July 2015	30 June 2016	
23	DF	(Spain) Dídac Vilà	(Italy) Milan	Free transfer	7 August 2015	30 June 2018	
24	FW	(Greece) Andreas Vlachomitros	(Greece) AEK Athens U20	Promotion	21 August 2015	30 June 2018	
25	MF	(Greece) Konstantinos Galanopoulos	(Greece) AEK Athens U20	Promotion	21 August 2015	30 June 2018	
28	DF	(Greece) Alkis Markopouliotis	(Greece) AEK Athens U20	Promotion	21 August 2015	30 June 2019	
29	MF	(Greece) Kyriakos Andreopoulos	(Greece) Kerkyra	€160,000	2 July 2016	30 June 2018	
30	MF	(Argentina) Diego Buonanotte	(Spain) Granada	Free transfer	15 August 2015	30 June 2017	
77	MF	(Greece) Stavros Vasilantonopoulos	(Greece) Apollon Smyrnis	Free transfer	1 July 2015	30 June 2018	
81	FW	(Greece) Antonis Kyriazis	(Greece) AEK Athens U20	Promotion	11 September 2015	30 June 2018	
—	DF	(Greece) Christopher Duberet	(Greece) Triglia Rafinas	Loan return	1 July 2015	30 June 2017	
—	DF	(Greece) Nikolaos Argyriou	(Greece) Episkopi	Loan return	1 July 2015	30 June 2017	
—	MF	(Serbia) Nikola Zivanović	(Greece) Anagennisi Ierapetras	Loan return	1 July 2015	30 June 2017	
—	MF	(Greece) Alexandros Dimgiokas	(Greece) Nea Ionia	Loan return	1 July 2015	30 June 2017	
—	MF	(Greece) Orestis Paliaroutas	(Greece) A.E. Kifisia	Loan return	1 July 2015	30 June 2017	
—	FW	(Greece) Lampros Thanailakis	(Greece) Ilisiakos	Loan return	1 July 2015	30 June 2017	

==== Winter ====
No.	Pos.	Player	From	Fee	Date	Contract Until	Source
14	FW	(Czech Republic) Tomáš Pekhart	(Germany) Ingolstadt 04	Free transfer	1 February 2016	30 June 2017	

=== Out ===
==== Summer ====
No.	Pos.	Player	To	Fee	Date	Source
4	MF	(Greece) Vasilios Rovas	(Greece) Aris	Contract termination	15 September 2015	
8	FW	(Brazil) Alexandre D'Acol	(Scotland) Hamilton Academical	Free transfer	25 August 2015	
16	FW	(Greece) Vasilios Tsevas	(Greece) Pierikos	Free transfer	26 September 2015	
23	FW	(Greece) Markos Dounis	(Greece) Aris	Contract termination	16 September 2015	
31	DF	(Greece) Nikolaos Georgeas	Retired		1 July 2015	
89	DF	(Greece) Georgios Sarris	(Turkey) Kayseri Erciyesspor	Contract termination	31 August 2015	
—	DF	(Greece) Nikolaos Argyriou	(Greece) Anagennisi Karditsa	Free transfer	11 September 2015	
—	DF	(Greece) Christopher Duberet	(Germany) Inter Leipzig	Free transfer	1 July 2015	
—	MF	(Serbia) Nikola Zivanović	(Greece) Atromitos U20	Free transfer	31 August 2015	
—	MF	(Greece) Alexandros Dimgiokas	(England) St. Panteleimon	Free transfer	1 July 2015	
—	MF	(Greece) Orestis Paliaroutas	(Greece) A.E. Kifisia	Free transfer	1 August 2015	
—	FW	(Greece) Lampros Thanailakis	(Greece) PAS Lamia	Free transfer	30 August 2015	

==== Winter ====
No.	Pos.	Player	To	Fee	Date	Source
3	DF	(Greece) Stavros Petavrakis	(Greece) Panthrakikos	Contract termination	20 January 2016	
14	MF	(Greece) Dimitrios Grontis	(Greece) Atromitos	Contract termination	20 January 2016	

=== Loan in ===
==== Summer ====
No.	Pos.	Player	From	Fee	Date	Until	Option to buy	Source
1	GK	(Venezuela) Alain Baroja	(Venezuela) Caracas	Free	19 July 2015	30 June 2016	✓	

==== Winter ====
No.	Pos.	Player	From	Fee	Date	Until	Option to buy	Source
36	MF	(Argentina) Bruno Zuculini	(England) Manchester City	Free	1 February 2016	30 June 2016	✗	

=== Loan out ===
==== Summer ====
No.	Pos.	Player	To	Fee	Date	Until	Option to buy	Source
17	FW	(Montenegro) Darko Zorić	(Serbia) Borac Čačak	Free	31 August 2015	30 June 2016	✗	

==== Winter ====
No.	Pos.	Player	To	Fee	Date	Until	Option to buy	Source
10	MF	(Greece) Dimitrios Anakoglou	(Greece) Veria	Free	2 February 2016	30 June 2016	✗	
29	MF	(Greece) Kyriakos Andreopoulos	(Greece) Kerkyra	Free	3 January 2016	30 June 2016	✗	
44	MF	(Senegal) Ablaye Faye	(Greece) Trikala	Free	1 February 2016	30 June 2016	✗	

=== Contract renewals ===
No.	Pos.	Player	Date	Former Exp. Date	New Exp. Date	Source
8	MF	(Portugal) André Simões	19 March 2016	30 June 2017	30 June 2019	
55	DF	(Greece) Adam Tzanetopoulos	4 February 2016	30 June 2016	30 June 2020	

=== Overall transfer activity ===
==== Expenditure ====
Summer: ▼€160,000

Winter: ▼€0

Total: ▼€160,000

==== Income ====
Summer: ▲€0

Winter: ▲€0

Total: ▲€0

==== Net Totals ====
Summer: ▼€160,000

Winter: €0

Total: ▼€160,000

== Pre-season and friendlies ==
23 July 2015 Friendly	AEK Athens	1–1	Hapoel Tel Aviv	Słubice
18:15 EEST (UTC+3)	Aravidis 38'	Report	Alhija 55'	Stadium: OSiR Stadium; Referee: Tomasz Piątek (Poland)

26 July 2015 Friendly	AEK Athens	2–0	Korona Kielce	Opalenica
12:00 EEST (UTC+3)	Arzo (yellow card) 41'; Vargas (penalty missed) 65', 73'; Chrisantus 70'	Report	Grzelak (yellow card) 45'	Stadium: Remes Training Ground; Referee: Maciej Pelka (Poland)

29 July 2015 Friendly	AEK Athens	1–0	Hapoel Katamon Jerusalem	Opalenica
19:00 EEST (UTC+3)	Galo 67'	Report		Stadium: Remes Training Center; Referee: Katarzyna Lisiecka-Sęk (Poland)

2 August 2015 Friendly	AEK Athens	1–2	Anorthosis Famagusta	Opalenica
19:00 EEST (UTC+3)	Djebbour (yellow card) 19'; Lampropoulos (red card) 48'; Grontis 82'	Report	Victor (yellow card) 19'; Makris 35'; Ndlovu 51' (pen.); Holgersson (yellow card) 85'	Stadium: Remes Training Center; Referee: Michal Szmytke (Poland)

5 August 2015 Friendly	AEK Athens	2–0	Miedź Legnica	Opalenica
19:00 EEST (UTC+3)	Anakoglou 33'; Crisantus 76'	Report	Labukas (yellow card) 26'	Stadium: Remes Training Center; Referee: Alicja Pawlak (Poland)

8 August 2015 Friendly	AEK Athens	1–1	Sevilla	Marousi
21:00 EEST (UTC+3)	Aravidis 2'; Galo (yellow card) 74'; Vasilantonopoulos (yellow card) 87'	Report	Reyes 19'	Stadium: Olympic Stadium; Attendance: 25,000; Referee: Andreas Pappas (Athens)

16 August 2015 Friendly	Internazionale	0–0	AEK Athens	Ancona
22:00 EEST (UTC+3)	Medel (yellow card) 42'; Miranda (yellow card) 78'	Report		Stadium: Stadio del Conero; Referee: Sebastiano Peruzzo (Italy)

4 September 2015 Friendly	Panetolikos	0–3	AEK Athens	Agrinio
19:00 EEST (UTC+3)	Kousas (yellow card) 17'	Report	Buonanotte 18' (pen.); Crisantus 35'; Barbosa (yellow card) 45'; Vasilantonopoulos 85'	Stadium: Panetolikos Stadium; Referee: Vasilis Panagiotopoulos (Aetoloacarnania)
Note: Friendly match as part of the transfer of Michalis Bakakis from the previous season. Before the start of the match the former player of both clubs, Dionysis Tsamis was honored.

15 September 2015 Friendly	AEK Athens	1–1	Apollon Smyrnis	Marousi
17:30 EEST (UTC+3)	Vargas 34'	Report	Tzioras 90'	Stadium: Olympic Stadium; Attendance: Behind closed doors Referee: Iosif Sfakianakis (Athens)

9 October 2015 Friendly	AEK Athens	3–3	Atromitos	Spata
12:00 EEST (UTC+3)	Buonanotte 58' (pen.); Barbosa 72'; Kolovetsios 84'	Report	Brito 48'; Marcelinho 59'; Kouros 62'	Stadium: Spata Training Centre; Referee: Spyros Stathopoulos (West Attica)

11 November 2015 Friendly	AEK Athens	4–0	AEK Athens U20	Spata
	Djebbour 6'; Buonanotte 35'; Cordero 43'; Crisantus 65'	Report		Stadium: Spata Training Centre

17 November 2015 Friendly	AEK Athens	5–0	AEK Athens U20	Spata
	Djebbour 2'; Arzo 3'; Buonanotte 13'; Crisantus 57'; Anakoglou 71'	Report		Stadium: Spata Training Centre
Note: 75-minute match (25+25+25 minutes).

29 December 2015 Charity match	AEK Athens	6–1	Greece homeless	Marousi
17:00 EET (UTC+2)	Anakoglou 10', 11'; Cordero 13'; Vargas 27'; Giannoutsos 65'; Faye 86'	Report	Tafilis 72' (pen.)	Stadium: Olympic Stadium; Attendance: 2,000; Referee: Evangelos Zaravinos (Athens)

28 April 2016 Friendly	AEK Athens	6–0	Ilisiakos	Spata
16:00 EEST (UTC+3)	Tzanetopoulos 17'; Platellas 32'; Buonanotte 38', 51'; Pekhart 55'; Crisantus 59'	Report		Stadium: Spata Training Centre; Attendance: Behind closed doors
Note: 70-minute match (35-minute halves).

== Competitions ==
=== Overall record ===
Competition	First match	Last match	Starting round	Final position	Record							
Competition	First match	Last match	Starting round	Final position	Pld	W	D	L	GF	GA	GD	Win %
Super League	22 August 2015	17 April 2016	Matchday 1	3rd	30	17	6	7	43	21	+22	56.67
Super League Play-offs	11 May 2016	31 May 2016	Matchday 1	4th	6	2	1	3	5	7	−2	33.33
Greek Cup	28 October 2015	17 May 2016	Group stage	Winners	10	9	1	0	24	3	+21	90.00
Total					46	28	8	10	72	31	+41	60.87

Last updated: 31 May 2016
Source: Competitions

=== Super League Greece ===
==== Regular season ====
===== League table =====
Pos	Team	Pld	W	D	L	GF	GA	GD	Pts	Qualification or relegation
1	Olympiacos (C)	30	28	1	1	81	16	+65	85	Qualification for the Champions League third qualifying round
2	Panathinaikos (Note: Panathinaikos were deducted 3 points due to extreme fan behavior against Olympiacos. The match was awarded as a 3–0 win for Olympiacos.)	30	18	4	8	52	26	+26	55	Qualification for the Play-offs
3	AEK Athens (Note: AEK were deducted 3 points due to extreme fan behavior against Atromitos.)	30	17	6	7	43	21	+22	54	Qualification for the Play-offs
4	PAOK (Note: PAOK were deducted 3 points due to extreme fan behavior against Olympiacos in Greek Cup semifinal match.)	30	13	9	8	45	32	+13	45	Qualification for the Play-offs
5	Panionios	30	12	8	10	33	27	+6	44	Qualification for the Play-offs

Source: Super League Greece
Rules for classification: 1) Points; 2) Head-to-head points; 3) Head-to-head goal difference; 4) Goals scored; 5) Goals against; 6) Play-offs (neutral ground); 7) Draw.
(Note: Criteria 6 is only used if needed to decide champion, teams for relegation or teams for UEFA competitions).
(C) Champions

===== Results summary =====
Overall								Home						Away					
Pld	W	D	L	GF	GA	GD	Pts	W	D	L	GF	GA	GD	W	D	L	GF	GA	GD
30	17	6	7	43	21	+22	54	13	0	2	31	6	+25	4	6	5	12	15	−3

Last updated: 2016-04-17.
Source: Super League Greece

===== Results by Matchday =====
Round	1	2	3	4	5	6	7	8	9	10	11	12	13	14	15	16	17	18	19	20	21	22	23	24	25	26	27	28	29	30
Ground	H	A	H	A	A	H	A	H	A	H	A	H	H	A	H	A	H	A	H	H	A	H	A	H	A	H	A	A	H	A
Result	W	D	W	L	W	W	L	W	D	L	W	W	W	D	L	W	W	W	W	W	L	W	D	W	D	W	L	D	W	L
Position	1	6	2	3	4	3	4	3	3	5	4	2	2	2	2	2	2	2	2	2	2	2	2	2	2	2	2	2	2	3

Updated to match(es) played on 17 April 2016. Source: slgr.gr
A = Away; H = Home; W = Win; D = Draw; L = Loss; P = Postponed

===== Matches =====
22 August 2015 1	AEK Athens	3–0	Platanias	Marousi
21:30 EEST (UTC+3)	Vargas 27'; Galo 47'; Aravidis 58'	Report	Banana (yellow card) 34'	Stadium: Olympic Stadium; Attendance: 15,868; Referee: Georgios Kominis (Thesprotia); Man of the Match: Vangelis Platellas

29 August 2015 2	Skoda Xanthi	0–0	AEK Athens	Xanthi
21:30 EEST (UTC+3)	Kapetanos (yellow card) 10'; Vasilakakis (yellow card) 25'; Bertos (yellow card) 81'; Baxevanidis (yellow card) 89'	Report	Tzanetopoulos (yellow card) 14'; Vargas (yellow card) 57'; Aravidis (yellow card) 81'; Soiledis (yellow card) 89'; Anakoglou (yellow card) 90+3'	Stadium: Skoda Xanthi Arena; Attendance: 2,978; Referee: Georgios Kyzas (Drama); Man of the Match: André Simões

13 September 2015 3	AEK Athens	3–1	PAS Giannina	Marousi
16:00 EEST (UTC+3)	Buonanotte 35' (pen.), 45'; Vargas 87'	Report	Acosta 20'; Michail (yellow card) 30' (yellow-red card) 74'; Struna (yellow card) 32'; Berios (yellow card) 34'; Tzimopoulos (yellow card) 38' (yellow-red card) 80'	Stadium: Olympic Stadium; Attendance: 14,567; Referee: Stavros Mantalos (Kavala); Man of the Match: Diego Buonanotte

23 September 2015 4	PAOK	2–1	AEK Athens	Thessaloniki
20:30 EEST (UTC+3)	Konstantinidis (yellow card) 26'; Tziolis (yellow card) 58'; Rodrigues 64'; Athanasiadis 84' (pen.), (yellow card) 85'; Tzavellas (yellow card) 86'	Report	Vargas (yellow card) 39'; Buonanotte (yellow card) 43'; Aravidis 47'; Simões (yellow card) 67'; Mantalos (yellow card) 90+4'	Stadium: Toumba Stadium; Attendance: 21,199; Referee: Anastasios Sidiropoulos (Dodecanese); Man of the Match: Garry Rodrigues

28 September 2015 5	Veria	1–2	AEK Athens	Veria
19:30 EEST (UTC+3)	Poungouras (yellow card) 28'; Neto 32'; Siontis (yellow card) 38'; Nazlidis (yellow card) 90+2'	Report	Buonanotte 49'; Simões (yellow card) 51'; Vargas (yellow card) 87'; Barbosa 90', (yellow card) 90+2'; Baroja (yellow card) 90+4'	Stadium: Veria Stadium; Attendance: 3,348; Referee: Alexandros Aretopoulos (Trikala); Man of the Match: Hélder Barbosa

4 October 2015 6	AEK Athens	1–0	Atromitos	Marousi
16:00 EEST (UTC+3)	Barbosa (yellow card) 19'; Galo (yellow card) 52'; Chrisantus 82'	Report	Marcelinho (yellow card) 7'; Godoy (yellow card) 17'; Kivrakidis (yellow card) 46'; Usero (yellow card) 49'; Fytanidis (yellow card) 81'	Stadium: Olympic Stadium; Attendance: 15,342; Referee: Georgios Kominis (Thesprotia); Man of the Match: Macauley Chrisantus

17 October 2015 7	Olympiacos	4–0	AEK Athens	Piraeus
20:30 EEST (UTC+3)	Botía 28', (yellow card) 44'; Siovas (yellow card) 38'; Masuaku (yellow card) 66'; Ideye 70'; Fortounis 78', 90+4' (pen.); Salino (yellow card) 89'	Report	Aravidis (yellow card) 31'; Cordero (yellow card) 45+1'; Barbosa (yellow card) 58'; Galo (yellow card) 90'	Stadium: Karaiskakis Stadium; Attendance: 30,056; Referee: Georgios Kyzas (Drama); Man of the Match: Brown Ideye

24 October 2015 8	AEK Athens	5–1	Iraklis	Marousi
19:30 EEST (UTC+3)	Vargas 31', 60'; Aravidis 35'; Kolovetsios (yellow card) 47'; Barbosa 67'; Vilà (yellow card) 76'; Lampropoulos (yellow card) 83'; Buonanotte 89'	Report	Bartolini (yellow card) 19'; Velios 64'; Bulut (yellow card) 83'	Stadium: Olympic Stadium; Attendance: 6,171; Referee: Stavros Tritsonis (Athens); Man of the Match: Ronald Vargas

1 November 2015 9	Panathinaikos	0–0	AEK Athens	Ampelokipoi
19:30 EET (UTC+2)	Berg (yellow card) 58'	Report	Vilà (yellow card) 56'	Stadium: Leoforos Alexandras Stadium; Attendance: 15,640; Referee: Stavros Mantalos (Kavala); Man of the Match: Jakob Johansson

8 November 2015 10	AEK Athens	0–1	Asteras Tripolis	Marousi
19:30 EET (UTC+2)	Vargas (red card) 45+2'; Barbosa (yellow card) 60'; Galo (yellow card) 74'; Mantalos (yellow card) 79'	Report	Kourbelis (yellow card) 36'; Lanzarote (yellow card) 45+2'; Iglesias (yellow card) 58'; Bertoglio (yellow card) 64'; Papadopoulos 89'	Stadium: Olympic Stadium; Attendance: 10,051; Referee: Michael Koukoulakis (Heraklion); Man of the Match: Dimitrios Kolovetsios

22 November 2015 11	Panthrakikos	1–2	AEK Athens	Komotini
19:30 EET (UTC+2)	Chasomeris (yellow card) 25'; Paschalakis (yellow card) 60'; Martins 68'; Nikoltsis (yellow card) 89'	Report	Barbosa (yellow card) 15'; Johansson 18'; Buonanotte 61' (pen.), (yellow card) 79'	Stadium: Komotini Municipal Stadium; Attendance: 2,005; Referee: Ioannis Delfakis (Arcadia); Man of the Match: Jakob Johansson

29 November 2015 12	AEK Athens	2–0	Panetolikos	Marousi
15:00 EET (UTC+2)	Mantalos (yellow card) 34', (penalty missed) 90+3'; Johansson 44'; Simões (yellow card) 53'; Platellas 74'	Report	Kappel (yellow card) 46'; Papazoglou (yellow card) 47'; Paulo (yellow card) 57' (yellow-red card) 87'	Stadium: Olympic Stadium; Attendance: 7,425; Referee: Athanasios Giachos (Chios); Man of the Match: Jakob Johansson

6 December 2015 13	AEK Athens	3–0	AEL Kalloni	Marousi
17:15 EET (UTC+2)	Djebbour 5'; Aravidis 19', 62'; Johansson (yellow card) 38'	Report		Stadium: Olympic Stadium; Attendance: 6,471; Referee: Athanasios Tzilos (Larissa); Man of the Match: Christos Aravidis

12 December 2015 14	Panionios	1–1	AEK Athens	Nea Smyrni
19:30 EET (UTC+2)	Bakasetas (yellow card) 25'; Boumale 37', (yellow card) 54'	Report	Djebbour (yellow card) 23'; Arzo (yellow card) 25' (yellow-red card) 68'; Barbosa 56'; Mantalos (yellow card) 87'	Stadium: Nea Smyrni Stadium; Attendance: 2,394; Referee: Dimitris Styliaras (Aetoloacarnania); Man of the Match: Olivier Boumale

21 December 2015 15	AEK Athens	1–2	Levadiakos	Marousi
19:30 EET (UTC+2)	Johansson 16'; Arzo (yellow card) 77'	Report	Domovchiyski (yellow card) 21', (goal) 70'; Nicolaou (yellow card) 45'; Moulopoulos (yellow card) 54'; Tripotseris 62'; Stathis (yellow card) 84'	Stadium: Olympic Stadium; Attendance: 5,007; Referee: Georgios Kominis (Thesprotia); Man of the Match: Panagiotis Tsintotas

3 January 2016 16	Platanias	0–3	AEK Athens	Chania
15:00 EET (UTC+2)	Milunović (yellow card) 53'; Ramos (yellow card) 76' (yellow-red card) 77'	Report	Barbosa 26', 31'; Vilà (yellow card) 64'; Djebbour 81'; Cordero (yellow card) 86'	Stadium: Perivolia Municipal Stadium; Attendance: 2,605; Referee: Charalampos Kalogeropoulos (Athens); Man of the Match: Hélder Barbosa

9 January 2016 17	AEK Athens	2–1	Skoda Xanthi	Marousi
19:30 EET (UTC+2)	Aravidis 10', (yellow card) 83'; Barbosa 53'; Vilà (yellow card) 81'	Report	Soltani 17', (yellow card) 57'; Vasilakakis (yellow card) 36'; Nieto (yellow card) 48', (penalty missed) 64'; Lisgaras (yellow card) 85'	Stadium: Olympic Stadium; Attendance: 6,422; Referee: Michael Koukoulakis (Heraklion); Man of the Match: Giannis Anestis

17 January 2016 18	PAS Giannina	0–2	AEK Athens	Ioannina
15:00 EET (UTC+2)	Lila (yellow card) 18'; Tsoukalas (penalty missed) 39', (yellow card) 53'	Report	Vargas 6'; Soiledis (yellow card) 23'; Simões (yellow card) 49'; Mantalos (yellow card) 55'; Barbosa 59'	Stadium: Zosimades Stadium; Attendance: 3,222; Referee: Ioannis Papadopoulos (Macedonia); Man of the Match: Giannis Anestis

24 January 2016 19	AEK Athens	1–0	PAOK	Marousi
19:30 EET (UTC+2)	Barbosa (yellow card) 31'; Vargas 33'; Vilà (yellow card) 36'; Aravidis (yellow card) 85'	Report	Athanasiadis (yellow card) 8'; Mak (yellow card) 33'; Berbatov (yellow card) 66' (red card) 83'; Charisis (yellow card) 79'	Stadium: Olympic Stadium; Attendance: 13,792; Referee: Athanasios Giachos (Chios); Man of the Match: André Simões

31 January 2016 20	AEK Athens	3–0	Veria	Marousi
15:00 EET (UTC+2)	Galo (yellow card) 37'; Vargas 39'; Arzo (yellow card) 45'; Aravidis 55'; Mantalos (yellow card) 81', (goal) 89'; Buonanotte (penalty missed) 89'	Report	Malón (yellow card) 53' (yellow-red card) 89'; Giannoulis (yellow card) 78'	Stadium: Olympic Stadium; Attendance: 6,463; Referee: Charalampos Kalogeropoulos (Athens); Man of the Match: Ronald Vargas

7 February 2016 21	Atromitos	1–0	AEK Athens	Peristeri
17:15 EET (UTC+2)	Chumbinho (yellow card) 49'; Brito 53', (yellow card) 54'; Stojčev (yellow card) 73'	Report	Mantalos (yellow card) 13'; Aravidis (yellow card) 64'; Vilà (yellow card) 66'; Zuculini (yellow card) 76'	Stadium: Peristeri Stadium; Attendance: 1,928; Referee: Georgios Kominis (Thesprotia); Man of the Match: Luiz Brito
Note: After the end of the match incidents between the fans of the 2 teams took place, which resulted in the punishment of both AEK and Atromitos with a deduction of 3 points in the league and 2 games behind closed doors, each.

13 February 2016 22	AEK Athens	1–0	Olympiacos	Marousi
19:45 EET (UTC+2)	Galo (yellow card) 45' (yellow-red card) 86'; Kolovetsios (yellow card) 55'; Buonanotte (penalty missed) 78'; Vargas 78'; Vilà (yellow card) 85'; Pekhart (yellow card) 90+2'	Report	Botía (red card) 47'; Milivojević (yellow card) 69' (yellow-red card) 76'; Domínguez (yellow card) 90+4'	Stadium: Olympic Stadium; Attendance: 31,121; Referee: Charalampos Kalogeropoulos (Athens); Man of the Match: Ronald Vargas

20 February 2016 23	Iraklis	1–1	AEK Athens	Thessaloniki
19:30 EET (UTC+2)	Romano (yellow card) 29'; Vellios (yellow card) 41'; Ziabaris 79'; Loukinas (yellow card) 89'; Perrone (yellow card) 90+3'	Report	Barbosa (yellow card) 26'; Arzo (yellow card) 36'; Vargas (yellow card) 50'; Pekhart 74'	Stadium: Kaftanzoglio Stadium; Attendance: 3,929; Referee: Ilias Spathas (Piraeus); Man of the Match: Nikos Ziabaris

28 February 2016 24	AEK Athens	1–0	Panathinaikos	Marousi
19:30 EET (UTC+2)	Vargas 78'; Simões (yellow card) 84'; Tzanetopoulos (yellow card) 89'	Report	Zeca (yellow card) 68'; Vlachodimos (yellow card) 77'; Koutroumpis (yellow card) 88'; Mesto (yellow card) 90+1' (yellow-red card) 90+4'; Abeid (red card) 90+7'	Stadium: Olympic Stadium; Attendance: 20,930; Referee: Michael Koukoulakis (Heraklion); Man of the Match: Ronald Vargas

7 March 2016 25	Asteras Tripolis	0–0	AEK Athens	Tripoli
19:30 EET (UTC+2)	Sankaré (yellow card) 30'; Kourbelis (yellow card) 34'; Fernández (yellow card) 57'; Iglesias (yellow card) 74'	Report	Simões (yellow card) 41'; Djebbour (yellow card) 76' (yellow-red card) 90+2'; Lampropoulos (yellow card) 88'	Stadium: Theodoros Kolokotronis Stadium; Attendance: 2,558; Referee: Anastasios Papapetrou (Athens); Man of the Match: Dimitrios Kourbelis

14 March 2016 26	AEK Athens	3–0	Panthrakikos	Marousi
19:30 EET (UTC+2)	Buonanotte 4'; Aravidis 11', 17'; Cordero (yellow card) 82'	Report	Ladakis (yellow card) 61'; Bougaidis (yellow card) 65'	Stadium: Olympic Stadium; Attendance: 2,647; Referee: Ioannis Papadopoulos (Macedonia); Man of the Match: Christos Aravidis

20 March 2016 27	Panetolikos	1–0	AEK Athens	Agrinio
15:00 EET (UTC+2)	Ferreyra (yellow card) 14'; Makos (yellow card) 44'; Paulo 90+4'	Report	Vargas (yellow card) 14'; Mantalos (yellow card) 57'; Vilà (yellow card) 84'; Baroja (yellow card) 90+4'	Stadium: Panetolikos Stadium; Attendance: 3,480; Referee: Ioannis Delfakis (Arcadia); Man of the Match: Marcos Paulo

3 April 2016 28	AEL Kalloni	0–0	AEK Athens	Mytilene
19:00 EEST (UTC+3)	Favalli (yellow card) 60'; Kaltsas (yellow card) 76'	Report	Simões (yellow card) 88'; Arzo (yellow card) 90+3'	Stadium: Mytilene Municipal Stadium; Attendance: 2,062; Referee: Dimitrios Thanos (Grevena); Man of the Match: Anestis Anastasiadis

10 April 2016 29	AEK Athens	2–0	Panionios	Marousi
19:00 EEST (UTC+3)	Cordero (yellow card) 60' (yellow-red card) 70'; Pekhart 72', 80'	Report	Bakasetas (yellow card) 40' (yellow-red card) 90+2'; Ikonomou (yellow card) 84'	Stadium: Olympic Stadium; Attendance: Behind closed doors Referee: Athanasios Giachos (Chios); Man of the Match: Tomáš Pekhart

17 April 2016 30	Levadiakos	3–0	AEK Athens	Livadeia
19:00 EEST (UTC+3)	Magas (yellow card) 24'; Mendy (yellow card) 31'; Vilà 39' (o.g.); Tzanetopoulos 40' (o.g.); Mantzios 63'; Ben (yellow card) 70'; Merebashvili (yellow card) 90+1'	Report	Bakakis (yellow card) 90+2'	Stadium: Levadia Municipal Stadium; Attendance: 590; Referee: Christos Mitsios (Epirus); Man of the Match: Vangelis Mantzios

==== Play-offs ====
===== Τable =====
Pos	Team	Pld	W	D	L	GF	GA	GD	Pts	Qualification
2	PAOK	6	3	3	0	8	3	+5	12	Qualification for the Champions League third qualifying round
3	Panathinaikos	6	2	3	1	8	6	+2	11	Qualification for the Europa League third qualifying round (Note: AEK Athens qualified for the Europa League third qualifying round by winning the Greek Cup.)
4	AEK Athens	6	2	1	3	5	7	−2	9	Qualification for the Europa League third qualifying round
5	Panionios (Note: The fifth-placed team of the 2015–16 Super League Greece Panionios would have qualified for the Europa League second qualifying round, but were excluded from participating in the 2016–17 European competitions by UEFA for financial reasons. As a result, the berth was given to the sixth-placed team PAS Giannina.)	6	1	1	4	2	7	−5	4	

Source: Super League Greece: Standings, Schedule
Rules for classification: 1) Points; 2) Head-to-head points; 3) Head-to-head goal difference; 4) Goals scored; 5) Goals against; 6) Regular season position.

===== Results summary =====
Overall								Home						Away					
Pld	W	D	L	GF	GA	GD	Pts	W	D	L	GF	GA	GD	W	D	L	GF	GA	GD
6	2	1	3	5	7	−2	9	2	1	0	4	1	+3	0	0	3	1	6	−5

Last updated: 2016-05-31.
Source: Super League Greece

===== Results by Matchday =====
Round	1	2	3	4	5	6
Ground	A	H	A	H	H	A
Result	L	W	L	W	D	L
Position	5	2	4	3	4	4

Updated to match(es) played on 31 May 2016. Source: slgr.gr
A = Away; H = Home; W = Win; D = Draw; L = Loss

===== Matches =====
11 May 2016 1	PAOK	2–1	AEK Athens	Thessaloniki
20:30 EEST (UTC+3)	Rodrigues (yellow card) 19', (goal) 61'; Tziolis (yellow card) 38'; Glykos (yellow card) 45'; Kitsiou (yellow card) 50'; Skondras (yellow card) 61'; Mystakidis 83'; Kaçe (red card) 90+5'	Report	Simões (yellow card) 24'; Djebbour (yellow card) 37' (red card) 90+5'; Johansson 44'; Vargas (yellow card) 50'; Barbosa (red card) 90+5'	Stadium: Toumba Stadium; Attendance: Behind closed doors Referee: Stavros Mantalos (Athens); Man of the Match: Garry Rodrigues

20 May 2016 2	AEK Athens	1–0	Panionios	Marousi
20:30 EEST (UTC+3)	Djebbour (yellow card) 35'; Johansson (yellow card) 38'; Mantalos 57'	Report	Masouras (yellow card) 24'; Siopis (yellow card) 33'; Vlachos (yellow card) 38'	Stadium: Olympic Stadium; Attendance: 9,472; Referee: Marios Lampropoulos (Elis); Man of the Match: Petros Mantalos

23 May 2016 3	Panathinaikos	3–0	AEK Athens	Ampelokipoi
20:30 EEST (UTC+3)	Lod 11', (yellow card) 17'; Berg 30', (yellow card) 75'; Mesto (yellow card) 82'; Klonaridis 90'	Report	Aravidis (yellow card) 40'; Simões (yellow card) 59'; Vilà (yellow card) 72'; Arzo (yellow card) 75'	Stadium: Leoforos Alexandras Stadium; Attendance: 8,018; Referee: Anastasios Sidiropoulos (Dodecanese); Man of the Match: Lucas Villafáñez

26 May 2016 4	AEK Athens	3–1	Panathinaikos	Marousi
20:30 EEST (UTC+3)	Johansson 5'; Barbosa 40', 69'; Bakakis (yellow card) 81'	Report	Berg (yellow card) 21'; Villafáñez (red card) 45+2'; Leto 54'; Abeid (yellow card) 71'; Moledo (yellow card) 80'	Stadium: Olympic Stadium; Attendance: 6,919; Referee: Michael Koukoulakis (Heraklion); Man of the Match: Hélder Barbosa

29 May 2016 5	AEK Athens	0–0	PAOK	Marousi
20:00 EEST (UTC+3)	Barbosa (yellow card) 27'; Pekhart (yellow card) 41' (yellow-red card) 49'	Report	Tzavellas (red card) 32'; Mak (yellow card) 42'; Kaçe (yellow card) 65'; Athanasiadis (yellow card) 80'; Glykos (yellow card) 90+3'	Stadium: Olympic Stadium; Attendance: 10,880; Referee: Athanasios Giachos (Thesprotia); Man of the Match: André Simões

31 May 2016 6	Panionios	1–0	AEK Athens	Nea Smyrni
20:15 EEST (UTC+3)	Masouras 41'	Report	Zuculini (yellow card) 38'	Stadium: Nea Smyrni Stadium; Attendance: 1,001; Referee: Andreas Pappas (Athens); Man of the Match: Georgios Masouras

=== Greek Cup ===
==== Group G ====
Pos	Team	Pld	W	D	L	GF	GA	GD	Pts	Qualification	AEK	AEL	SKO	PNF
1	AEK Athens	3	3	0	0	12	0	+12	9	Round of 16		—	—	6–0
2	AEL	3	2	0	1	5	6	−1	6	Round of 16	0–5		1–0	—
3	Skoda Xanthi	3	1	0	2	5	2	+3	3		0–1	—		—
4	Panelefsiniakos	3	0	0	3	1	15	−14	0		—	1–4	0–5	

Source: epo.gr

==== Matches ====
===== Group stage =====
28 October 2015 1	Skoda Xanthi	0–1	AEK Athens	Xanthi
15:30 EET (UTC+2)	Farkaš (yellow card) 7'; Wallace (yellow card) 63'; Papasterianos (yellow card) 76'	Report	Chrisantus 51'; Baroja (yellow card) 69'; Cordero (yellow card) 71'	Stadium: Skoda Xanthi Arena; Attendance: 500; Referee: Giannis Delfakis (Arcadia); Man of the Match: Hélder Barbosa

2 December 2015 2	AEK Athens	6–0	Panelefsiniakos	Marousi
17:15 EET (UTC+2)	Platellas 8'; Johansson 27'; Buonaotte 31', 81'; Soiledis 45+1'; Aravidis 78'	Report		Stadium: Olympic Stadium; Attendance: 2,160; Referee: Aristotelis Diamantopoulos (Arcadia); Man of the Match: Diego Buonanotte

17 December 2015 3	AEL	0–5	AEK Athens	Larissa
19:30 EET (UTC+2)	A. Lampropoulos (yellow card) 51'	Report	Djebbour 18'; Buonanotte 41', 54'; V. Lampropoulos (yellow card) 73'; Vargas 88'; Mantalos 89'; Tzanetopoulos (yellow card) 90+1'	Stadium: AEL FC Arena; Attendance: Behind closed doors Referee: Athanasios Sezos (Kilkis); Man of the Match: Diego Buonanotte

===== Round of 16 =====
6 January 2016 First leg	Levadiakos	0–1	AEK Athens	Livadeia
17:15 EET (UTC+2)	Matzios (yellow card) 16'; Tripotseris (yellow card) 44'; Stathis (yellow card) 55'; Moulopoulos (yellow card) 87'; Macheras (yellow card) 90+2'	Report	Buonanotte (yellow card) 10'; Djebbour (yellow card) 16'; Cordero (yellow card) 24'; Vargas 30'; Barbosa (yellow card) 45+1'	Stadium: Levadia Municipal Stadium; Referee: Athanasios Giachos (Chios); Man of the Match: Ronald Vargas

13 January 2016 Second leg	AEK Athens	2–0 (3–0 agg.)	Levadiakos	Marousi
17:15 EET (UTC+2)	Johansson 44'; Buonanotte (yellow card) 61', (goal) 85'	Report	Tsurikov (yellow card) 65'; Matzios (yellow card) 69'; Stathis (yellow card) 84'	Stadium: Olympic Stadium; Referee: Anastasios Sidiropoulos (Dodecanese); Man of the Match: Michalis Bakakis

===== Quarter-finals =====
28 January 2016 First leg	AEK Athens	4–1	Iraklis	Marousi
19:30 EET (UTC+2)	Ziabaris 7' (o.g.); Bakakis (yellow card) 27' (yellow-red card) 32'; Kolovetsios 45+1'; Platellas 72'; Aravidis 85' (pen.)	Report	Pasas (yellow card) 32'; Boukouvalas (yellow card) 51'; Ziabaris (yellow card) 67'; Huanderson (yellow card) 84'; Vellios 90'	Stadium: Olympic Stadium; Referee: Giannis Delfakis (Arcadia); Man of the Match: Christos Aravidis

4 February 2016 Second leg	Iraklis	0–1 (1–5 agg.)	AEK Athens	Thessaloniki
19:30 EET (UTC+2)		Report	Zuculini (yellow card) 35'; Mantalos 50'	Stadium: Kaftanzoglio Stadium; Referee: Dimitris Thanos (Grevena); Man of the Match: Petros Mantalos

===== Semi-finals =====
20 April 2016 First leg	AEK Athens	1–0	Atromitos	Marousi
19:00 EEST (UTC+3)	Mantalos 73'	Report	Matei (yellow card) 85'	Stadium: Olympic Stadium; Attendance: Behind closed doors Referee: Alexis Aretopoulos (Trikala); Man of the Match: Petros Mantalos

26 April 2016 Second leg	Atromitos	1–1 (1–2 agg.)	AEK Athens	Peristeri
18:00 EEST (UTC+3)	Kivrakidis (yellow card) 63'; Brito 68' (pen.)	Report	Barbosa (yellow card) 32'; Lampropoulos (yellow card) 67'; Kolovetsios (yellow card) 78'; Djebbour 88'	Stadium: Peristeri Stadium; Attendance: Behind closed doors Referee: Giorgos Kyzas (Drama); Man of the Match: Rafik Djebbour

===== Final =====
17 May 2016 Final	Olympiacos	1–2	AEK Athens	Marousi
20:30 EEST (UTC+3)	Milivojević (yellow card) 32'; Botía (yellow card) 77'; Domínguez 84'	Report	Mantalos 38'; Simões (yellow card) 41'; Aravidis (yellow card) 43'; Djebbour 51'; Vilà (yellow card) 62'; Bakakis (yellow card) 90+5'	Stadium: Olympic Stadium; Attendance: Behind closed doors Referee: Anastasios Sidiropoulos (Dodecanese); Man of the Match: Petros Mantalos

== Statistics ==
=== Squad statistics ===
As of 31 May 2016

No.	Pos	Player	Super League		Super League Play-offs		Greek Cup		Total	
No.	Pos	Player	Apps	Goals	Apps	Goals	Apps	Goals	Apps	Goals
Goalkeepers
1	GK	(Venezuela) Alain Baroja	23	0	2	0	4	0	29	0
13	GK	(Greece) Panagiotis Dounis	0	0	0	0	0	0	0	0
16	GK	(Greece) Ilias Vouras	0	0	0	0	0	0	0	0
22	GK	(Greece) Giannis Anestis	7	0	4	0	6	0	17	0
—	GK	(Greece) Fotis Karagiolidis	0	0	0	0	0	0	0	0
Defenders
2	DF	(Greece) Aristidis Soiledis	12	0	2	0	7	1	21	1
4	DF	(Spain) César Arzo	19	0	4	0	1	0	24	0
5	DF	(Greece) Vasilios Lampropoulos	19	0	2	0	9	0	30	0
12	DF	(Brazil) Rodrigo Galo	27	1	4	0	6	0	37	1
15	DF	(Greece) Stratos Svarnas	0	0	0	0	1	0	1	0
23	DF	(Spain) Dídac Vilà	21	0	5	0	5	0	31	0
26	DF	(Greece) Dimitrios Kolovetsios	24	0	5	0	8	1	37	1
27	DF	(Greece) Michalis Bakakis	3	0	4	0	7	0	14	0
28	DF	(Greece) Alkis Markopouliotis	0	0	0	0	0	0	0	0
55	DF	(Greece) Adam Tzanetopoulos	10	0	3	0	4	0	17	0
Midfielders
6	MF	(Spain) Miguel Cordero	13	0	4	0	7	0	24	0
8	MF	(Portugal) André Simões	26	0	5	0	9	0	40	0
18	MF	(Sweden) Jakob Johansson	29	3	5	2	8	2	42	7
20	MF	(Greece) Petros Mantalos	25	1	4	1	7	4	36	6
25	MF	(Greece) Konstantinos Galanopoulos	0	0	1	0	0	0	1	0
30	MF	(Argentina) Diego Buonanotte	24	6	3	0	8	5	35	11
36	MF	(Argentina) Bruno Zuculini	2	0	1	0	1	0	4	0
77	MF	(Greece) Stavros Vasilantonopoulos	1	0	1	0	1	0	3	0
Forwards
7	FW	(Portugal) Hélder Barbosa	26	7	4	2	4	0	34	9
9	FW	(Venezuela) Ronald Vargas	25	9	1	0	6	2	32	11
11	FW	(Greece) Vangelis Platellas	14	1	4	0	7	2	25	3
14	FW	(Czech Republic) Tomáš Pekhart	9	3	5	0	3	0	17	3
19	FW	(Algeria) Rafik Djebbour	18	2	4	0	9	3	31	5
21	FW	(Greece) Christos Aravidis	28	9	6	0	7	2	41	11
24	FW	(Greece) Andreas Vlachomitros	0	0	1	0	0	0	1	0
33	FW	(Croatia) Ivan Brečević	0	0	0	0	0	0	0	0
81	FW	(Greece) Antonis Kyriazis	0	0	0	0	0	0	0	0
99	FW	(Nigeria) Macauley Chrisantus	8	1	0	0	2	1	10	2
Left during Winter Transfer Window
3	DF	(Greece) Stavros Petavrakis	0	0	0	0	0	0	0	0
10	MF	(Greece) Dimitrios Anakoglou	3	0	0	0	0	0	3	0
29	MF	(Greece) Kyriakos Andreopoulos	0	0	0	0	0	0	0	0
44	MF	(Senegal) Ablaye Faye	0	0	0	0	2	0	2	0
—	MF	(Greece) Dimitris Grontis	0	0	0	0	0	0	0	0

=== Goalscorers ===
As of 31 May 2016
The list is sorted by competition order when total goals are equal, then by position and then by squad number.

Rank	No.	Pos.	Player	Super League	Super League Play-offs	Greek Cup	Total
1	21	FW	(Greece) Christos Aravidis	9	0	2	11
1	9	MF	(Venezuela) Ronald Vargas	9	0	2	11
1	30	MF	(Argentina) Diego Buonanotte	6	0	5	11
4	7	FW	(Portugal) Hélder Barbosa	7	2	0	9
5	18	MF	(Sweden) Jakob Johansson	3	2	2	7
6	19	FW	(Algeria) Rafik Djebbour	2	0	3	5
6	20	MF	(Greece) Petros Mantalos	1	1	3	5
8	14	FW	(Czech Republic) Tomáš Pekhart	3	0	0	3
8	11	FW	(Greece) Vangelis Platellas	1	0	2	3
10	99	FW	(Nigeria) Macauley Chrisantus	1	0	1	2
11	12	DF	(Brazil) Rodrigo Galo	1	0	0	1
11	26	DF	(Greece) Dimitrios Kolovetsios	0	0	1	1
11	2	DF	(Greece) Aristidis Soiledis	0	0	1	1
Own goals				0	0	1	1
Totals				43	5	23	71

=== Assists ===
As of 31 May 2016
The list is sorted by competition order when total assists are equal, then by position and then by squad number.

Rank	No.	Pos.	Player	Super League	Super League Play-offs	Greek Cup	Total
1	9	MF	(Venezuela) Ronald Vargas	4	0	3	7
2	12	DF	(Brazil) Rodrigo Galo	5	0	1	6
2	18	MF	(Sweden) Jakob Johansson	4	1	1	6
2	21	FW	(Greece) Christos Aravidis	3	0	3	6
2	20	MF	(Greece) Petros Mantalos	2	2	2	6
6	7	FW	(Portugal) Hélder Barbosa	4	0	0	4
7	23	DF	(Spain) Dídac Vilà	2	0	1	3
8	8	MF	(Portugal) André Simões	1	1	0	2
8	19	FW	(Algeria) Rafik Djebbour	1	0	1	2
8	27	DF	(Greece) Michalis Bakakis	0	0	2	2
11	4	DF	(Spain) César Arzo	1	0	0	1
11	2	DF	(Greece) Aristidis Soiledis	1	0	0	1
Totals				28	4	14	46

=== Clean sheets ===
As of 31 May 2016
The list is sorted by competition order when total clean sheets are equal and then by squad number. Clean sheets in games where both goalkeepers participated are awarded to the goalkeeper who started the game. Goalkeepers with no appearances are not included.

Rank	No.	Player	Super League	Super League Play-offs	Greek Cup	Total
1	1	(Venezuela) Alain Baroja	12	0	3	15
2	22	(Greece) Giannis Anestis	4	2	4	10
Totals			16	2	7	25

=== Disciplinary record ===
As of 31 May 2016

N	P	Nat.	Name	Super League			Super League Play-offs			Greek Cup			Total			Notes
N	P	Nat.	Name	Yellow card	Second yellow card	Red card	Yellow card	Second yellow card	Red card	Yellow card	Second yellow card	Red card	Yellow card	Second yellow card	Red card	Notes
Goalkeepers
1	GK	(Venezuela)	Alain Baroja	2						1			3			
13	GK	(Greece)	Panagiotis Dounis													
16	GK	(Greece)	Ilias Vouras													
22	GK	(Greece)	Giannis Anestis													
—	GK	(Greece)	Fotis Karagiolidis													
Defenders
2	DF	(Greece)	Aristidis Soiledis	2									2			
4	DF	(Spain)	César Arzo	6	1		1						7	1		
5	DF	(Greece)	Vasilios Lampropoulos	2						2			4			
12	DF	(Brazil)	Rodrigo Galo	6	1								6	1		
15	DF	(Greece)	Stratos Svarnas													
23	DF	(Spain)	Dídac Vilà	8			1			1			10			
26	DF	(Greece)	Dimitrios Kolovetsios	2						1			3			
27	DF	(Greece)	Michalis Bakakis	1			1			2	1		4	1		
28	DF	(Greece)	Alkis Markopouliotis													
55	DF	(Greece)	Adam Tzanetopoulos	2						1			3			
Midfielders
6	MF	(Spain)	Miguel Cordero	5	1					2			7	1		
8	MF	(Portugal)	André Simões	7			2						9			
18	MF	(Sweden)	Jakob Johansson	1			1						2			
20	MF	(Greece)	Petros Mantalos	8									8			
25	MF	(Greece)	Konstantinos Galanopoulos													
30	MF	(Argentina)	Diego Buonanotte	2						2			4			
36	MF	(Argentina)	Bruno Zuculini	1			1			1			3			
77	MF	(Greece)	Stavros Vasilantonopoulos													
Forwards
7	FW	(Portugal)	Hélder Barbosa	7			1		1	2			10		1	
9	FW	(Venezuela)	Ronald Vargas	5		1	1						6		1	
11	FW	(Greece)	Vangelis Platellas													
14	FW	(Czech Republic)	Tomáš Pekhart	1			2	1					3	1		
19	FW	(Algeria)	Rafik Djebbour	1			2			1			4			
21	FW	(Greece)	Christos Aravidis	5			1			1			7			
24	FW	(Greece)	Andreas Vlachomitros													
33	FW	(Croatia)	Ivan Brečević													
81	FW	(Greece)	Antonis Kyriazis													
99	FW	(Nigeria)	Macauley Chrisantus													
Left during Winter Transfer window
3	DF	(Greece)	Stavros Petavrakis													
10	MF	(Greece)	Dimitrios Anakoglou	1									1			
29	MF	(Greece)	Kyriakos Andreopoulos													
44	MF	(Senegal)	Ablaye Faye													
—	MF	(Greece)	Dimitris Grontis													

=== Starting 11 ===
This section presents the most frequently used formation along with the players with the most starts across all competitions.

N.	Formation	Matchday(s)
29	4–3–3	4, 11–25, 28
17	4–2–3–1	1–3, 5–10, 29, 30
1	4–4–2 (D)	26

No.	Nat.	Player	Pos.
1	(Venezuela)	Alain Baroja	GK
26	(Greece)	Dimitris Kolovetsios	RCB
4	(Spain)	César Arzo	LCB
12	(Brazil)	Rodrigo Galo	RB
23	(Spain)	Dídac Vilà	LB
8	(Portugal)	André Simões	DM
18	(Sweden)	Jakob Johansson	RCM
20	(Greece)	Petros Mantalos (C)	LCM
9	(Venezuela)	Ronald Vargas	RW
7	(Portugal)	Hélder Barbosa	LW
21	(Greece)	Christos Aravidis	CF

Last updated: 2016-05-31

== Awards ==
Player	Pos.	Award	Source
(Brazil) Rodrigo Galo	DF	Best Goal Award (1st Matchday)	
(Argentina) Diego Buonanotte	MF	MVP Award (3rd Matchday)	
(Argentina) Diego Buonanotte	MF	Best Goal Award (3rd Matchday)	
(Portugal) Hélder Barbosa	FW	Best Goal Award (5th Matchday)	
(Greece) Christos Aravidis	FW	Best Goal Award (8th Matchday)	
(Sweden) Jakob Johansson	MF	MVP Award (11th Matchday)	
(Portugal) Hélder Barbosa	FW	Best Goal Award (16th Matchday)	
(Greece) Giannis Anestis	GK	MVP Award (17th Matchday)	
(Portugal) Hélder Barbosa	FW	Best Goal Award (17th Matchday)	
(Portugal) Hélder Barbosa	FW	Best Goal Award (18th Matchday)	
(Venezuela) Ronald Vargas	FW	MVP Award (24th Matchday)	
(Venezuela) Ronald Vargas	FW	Best Goal Award (24th Matchday)	
(Czech Republic) Tomáš Pekhart	FW	Best Goal Award (29th Matchday)	
(Argentina) Diego Buonanotte	MF	Greek Cup Top Scorer	
(Brazil) Rodrigo Galo	DF	Team of the Season	
