= 2015–16 Atromitos F.C. season =

Atromitos Athens F.C.
2015–16 season
- Chairman: Georgios Spanos
- Manager: Traianos Dellas
- Stadium: Peristeri Stadium (Capacity: 10,200)
- Super League Greece: 8th
- Greek Cup: Semi-finals
- UEFA Europa League: Play-off round
- Top goalscorer: League: Anthony Le Tallec (7); All: Anthony Le Tallec (8)
Home colours	Away colours	Third colours

The 2015–16 season of Atromitos is the 93st in the club's history and the second consecutive season that the club will be participating in the UEFA Europa League. It will also be the eighth consecutive season that the club will be competing in Super League Greece.

== Events ==
=== Important Moments ===
- 30 July: Atromitos achieves great victory with two goals difference across AIK 3–1 with goals from Napoleoni 3 minute, 15 the Marcelinho made two finishes to his team and Umbides to shape the final 1-3 European Match is play off
- 6 August: Atromitos Sealed qualification with a 4-1 aggregate after winning 1–0 at primary stage by goal Marselinio 67 ' and seal qualification for the playoffs the Europa League will face Fenerbahce 's Van Persie

== Current squad ==
As of 16 June 2015

Note: Flags indicate national team as defined under FIFA eligibility rules; some limited exceptions apply. Players may hold more than one non-FIFA nationality.

No.	Pos.	Nation	Player
1	GK	GRE	Vasilis Barkas
2	DF	GRE	Giannis Kontoes
3	DF	GRE	Alexandros Kouros
6	DF	GRE	Sokratis Fytanidis
7	MF	BRA	Eduardo Brito
8	MF	ESP	Fernando Usero
9	FW	ROU	Cosmin Matei
10	MF	ARG	Javier Umbides
11	FW	BRA	Marcelinho
14	FW	FRA	Anthony Le Tallec
16	MF	GRE	Panagiotis Ballas
18	MF	MNE	Miloš Stojčev
19	DF	GRE	Kyriakos Kivrakidis
20	MF	ARG	Mariano Bíttolo

No.	Pos.	Nation	Player
21	DF	SEN	Pape M'Bow
22	DF	GRE	Pantelis Theologou
24	DF	GRE	Nikolaos Lazaridis
25	MF	GRE	Michalis Bastakos
26	MF	ARG	Pitu Garcia
28	MF	GRE	Spyros Natsos
29	FW	GRE	Dimitrios Limnios
30	GK	BLR	Andrey Gorbunov
32	MF	GRE	Dimitris Grontis
33	FW	GRE	Dimitrios Papadopoulos
34	MF	SEN	Paul Keita
35	GK	GRE	Christos Theodorakis
86	MF	BRA	Chumbinho
90	FW	ITA	Stefano Napoleoni

=== Out on loan ===
Note: Flags indicate national team as defined under FIFA eligibility rules; some limited exceptions apply. Players may hold more than one non-FIFA nationality.

No.	Pos.	Nation	Player
—	MF	GRE	Manolis Kallergis

== Personnel ==
=== Management ===
Ownership	(Greece) Georgios Spanos
President & CEO	(Greece) Georgios Spanos
Vice President	(Greece) Evangelos Batagiannis
Vice CEO	(Greece) Ekaterini Koxenoglou
General Director	(Greece) Spyridon Sofianos
Technical Director	(Greece) Ioannis Angelopoulos
Press Director	(Greece) Pavlos Katonis
Marketing Director	(Greece) Spyridon Boulousis
Security Director	(Greece) Georgios Petrou
Computing Director	(Greece) Roberto Panagos
Accountants Director	(Greece) Vasilios Karakatsanis
Ground Manager	(Greece) Panagiotis Michaletos
Tickets Director	(Greece) Roberto Panagos
Legal Department	(Greece) Argirios Livas

=== Technical staff ===
Position	Staff
Head coach	(Greece) Traianos Dellas
Assistant coach	(Greece) Vassilios Borbokis
Goalkeeping coach	(Serbia) Slobodan Šujica
Fitness coach	(Greece) Giannis Georgiadis
Medical Director	(Greece) Nikolaos Piskopakis
Doctor	(Greece) Petros Kapralos
Physiotherapist	(Greece) Panagiotis Ambeliotis
Physiotherapist	(Greece) Nikolaos Zafeiropoulos
Exercise Physio	(Greece) Georgios Ziogas
Scout	(Greece) Vasilis Kalogiannis
Caregiver	(Greece) Nikolaos Katsikas

== Competitions ==
=== Super League Greece ===
==== League table ====
Pos	Team	Pld	W	D	L	GF	GA	GD	Pts	Qualification or relegation
6	PAS Giannina	30	12	6	12	36	40	−4	42	Qualification for the Europa League second qualifying round (Note: The fifth-placed team of the 2015–16 Super League Greece Panionios would have qualified for the UEFA Europa League second qualifying round, but were excluded from participating in the 2016–17 European competitions by UEFA for financial reasons. As a result, the berth was given to the sixth-placed team PAS Giannina.)
7	Asteras Tripolis	30	11	8	11	31	30	+1	41	
8	Atromitos (Note: Atromitos were deducted 3 points due to extreme fan behavior against AEK.)	30	12	6	12	26	31	−5	39 (Note: Head-to-head points: Atromitos 4, Platanias 1.)	
9	Platanias	30	10	9	11	32	30	+2	39	
10	Levadiakos	30	9	10	11	27	36	−9	37	

Source: Super League Greece
Rules for classification: 1) Points; 2) Head-to-head points; 3) Head-to-head goal difference; 4) Goals scored; 5) Goals against; 6) Play-offs (neutral ground); 7) Draw.
(Note: Criteria 6 is only used if needed to decide champion, teams for relegation or teams for UEFA competitions).

==== Matches ====
Win Draw Loss Postponed

23 August 2015 1	Atromitos	1 - 0	Levadiakos	Peristeri
19:15 (UTC+2)	Eduardo Brito 37'			Stadium: Peristeri Stadium; Referee: Alexandros Aretopoulos

31 August 2015 2	Platanias	1 - 2	Atromitos	Chania
20:30 (UTC+2)				Stadium: Perivolia Municipal Stadium; Referee: Dimitrios Thanos

3	Atromitos	0 - 1	Skoda Xanthi	Peristeri
				Stadium: Peristeri Stadium

4	PAS Giannina	1 - 0	Atromitos	Ioannina
				Stadium: Zosimades Stadium

5	Atromitos	1 - 2	PAOK	Peristeri
				Stadium: Peristeri Stadium

6	AEK Athens	1 - 0	Atromitos	Athens
				Stadium: Spiros Louis

18 October 2015 7	Veria	0 - 1	Atromitos	Veria
				Stadium: Veria Stadium

25 October 2015 8	Atromitos	1 - 2	Olympiacos	Peristeri
15:00 (UTC+2)				Stadium: Peristeri Stadium

2 November 2015 9	Iraklis	2 - 0	Atromitos	Thessaloniki
19:30 (UTC+2)				Stadium: Kaftantzogleio Stadium

7 November 2015 10	Atromitos	1 - 2	Panathinaikos	Peristeri
19:30 (UTC+2)	52' Napoleoni		Karelis 72'; Berg 84'	Stadium: Peristeri Stadium

21 November 2015 11	Asteras Tripolis	1 - 0	Atromitos	Tripoli
15:00 (UTC+2)	85' Nicolás Fernández			Stadium: Theodoros Kolokotronis Stadium

28 November 2015 12	Atromitos	1 - 2	Panthrakikos	Peristeri
15:00 (UTC+2)	78' Napoleoni		Melissis 41'; Iliadis 81'	Stadium: Peristeri Stadium

7 December 2015 13	Panetolikos	1 - 1	Atromitos	Agrinio
19:30 (UTC+2)	69' Villafáñez		Brito 65'	Stadium: Panetolikos Stadium

13 December 2015 14	Atromitos	1 - 0	AEL Kalloni	Peristeri
17:15 (UTC+2)	90+4' Usero			Stadium: Peristeri Stadium

19 December 2015 15	Atromitos	1 - 0	Panionios	Peristeri
15:00 (UTC+2)	88' Lazaridis			Stadium: Peristeri Stadium

17 February 2016 16	Levadiakos	1 - 1	Atromitos	Levadia
19:30 (UTC+2)	56' (pen.) Mantzios		Fytanidis 51'	Stadium: Levadia Municipal Stadium

9 January 2016 17	Atromitos	0 - 0	Platanias	Peristeri
15:00 (UTC+2)				Stadium: Peristeri Stadium

16 January 2016 18	Skoda Xanthi	2 - 2	Atromitos	Xanthi
15:00 (UTC+2)	51' Kapetanos; 74' Nieto		Umbides 34'; Lazaridis 59'	Stadium: Skoda Xanthi Arena

24 January 2016 19	Atromitos	0 - 2	PAS Giannina	Peristeri
17:15 (UTC+2)			Manias 72'; Tsoukalas 89'	Stadium: Peristeri Stadium

30 January 2016 20	PAOK	1 - 1	Atromitos	Thessaloniki
19:30 (UTC+2)	Mak 31'		81' Lazaridis	Stadium: Toumba Stadium

7 February 2016 21	Atromitos	1 - 0	AEK Athens	Peristeri
17:15 (UTC+2)	53' Brito			Stadium: Peristeri Stadium

13 February 2016 22	Atromitos	0 - 0	Veria	Peristeri
15:00 (UTC+2)				Stadium: Peristeri Stadium

21 February 2016 23	Olympiacos	4 - 0	Atromitos	Piraeus
15:00 (UTC+2)	Dominguez 18'; Pulido 65'; Cambiasso 74'; Fortounis 85'			Stadium: Karaiskakis Stadium

29 February 2016 24	Atromitos	1–0	Iraklis	Peristeri
19:30 (UTC+2)	25' (France) Le Tallec			Stadium: Peristeri Stadium

5 March 2016 25	Panathinaikos	2 - 0	Atromitos	Athens
19:30 (UTC+2)	Evangelista 08'; Villafáñez 70'			Stadium: Leoforos Alexandras Stadium

13 March 2016 26	Atromitos	2 - 1	Asteras Tripolis	Peristeri
15:00 (UTC+2)	68' Lazaridis; 89' Le Tallec		Dimoutsos 17'	Stadium: Peristeri Stadium

20 March 2016 27	Panthrakikos	0 - 1	Atromitos	Komotini
17:15 (UTC+2)			21' Le Tallec	Stadium: Municipal Komotini Stadium

3 April 2016 28	Atromitos	1 - 0	Panetolikos	Peristeri
19:00 (UTC+2)	Le Tallec (France) 45'			Stadium: Peristeri Stadium

10 April 2016 29	AEL Kalloni	2 - 4	Atromitos	Mytilene
19:00 (UTC+2)	Manousos 52' (pen.); Anastasiadis 57'		5' Matei; 6' Usero; 60' Eduardo Brito; 77' Le Tallec	Stadium: Mytilene Municipal Stadium

17 April 2016 30	Panionios	0 - 1	Atromitos	Athens
19:00 (UTC+2)			Stojčev 78'	Stadium: Nea Smyrni Stadium

=== Greek Cup ===
==== Group F ====
Pos	Team	Pld	W	D	L	GF	GA	GD	Pts	Qualification	ATR	VER	KLT	LAM
1	Atromitos	3	2	1	0	8	4	+4	7	Round of 16		2–2	—	—
2	Veria	3	2	1	0	4	2	+2	7	Round of 16	—		1–0	—
3	Kallithea	3	1	0	2	4	6	−2	3		2–4	—		2–1
4	Lamia	3	0	0	3	1	5	−4	0		0–2	0–1	—	

Source: epo.gr

28 October 2015 1	Atromitos	2 - 2	Veria	Peristeri
15:00 UTC +2	84' Kouros; 88' Lazaridis		44' Majewski; 52' Kajkut	Stadium: Peristeri Stadium

1 December 2015 2	Lamia	0 - 2	Atromitos	Lamia
17:15 UTC +2			58', 66' (pen.) Napoleoni	Stadium: Lamia Stadium

16 December 2015 3	Kallithea	2 - 4	Atromitos	Kallithea, Athens
17:15 UTC +2	41' (pen.) Alex.Arnarellis; 51' Macena		Kouros 18'; Le Tallec 37'; Brito 52'; Napoleoni 68' (pen.)	Stadium: Gregoris Lambrakis Stadium

==== Round of 16 ====
6 January 2016 1	Platanias	0 - 0	Atromitos	Chania, Greece
15:00 (UTC+2)				Stadium: Perivolia Municipal Stadium

=== UEFA Europa League ===
==== Qualifying phase ====
===== Third qualifying round =====
Win Draw Loss Postponed

30 July 2015	AIK (Sweden)	1–3	(Greece) Atromitos	Friends Arena, Solna
19:00	Goitom 70' (pen.)	Report	Napoleoni 3'; Marcelinho 15'; Umbides 80' (pen.)	Attendance: 9,771; Referee: Christian Dingert (Germany)

6 August 2015	Atromitos (Greece)	1–0	(Sweden) AIK	Peristeri Stadium, Athens
20:00	Marcelinho 67'	Report		Attendance: 2,587; Referee: Artyom Kuchin (Kazakhstan)

Atromitos won 4–1 on aggregate.

===== Play-Off =====
Win Draw Loss Postponed

20 August 2015	Atromitos	0 - 1	Fenerbahçe (Turkey)	Peristeri Stadium, Athens
21:00			Van Persie 90'	Referee: Daniele Orsato (Italy)

27 August 2015	Fenerbahçe (Turkey)	3 - 0	Atromitos	Şükrü Saracoğlu Stadium, Istanbul
	Fernandão 7', 78'; Harbunow 59' (o.g.)			Referee: Ivan Bebek (Croatia)
