= Vasilis Barkas =

Greek footballer (born 1994)

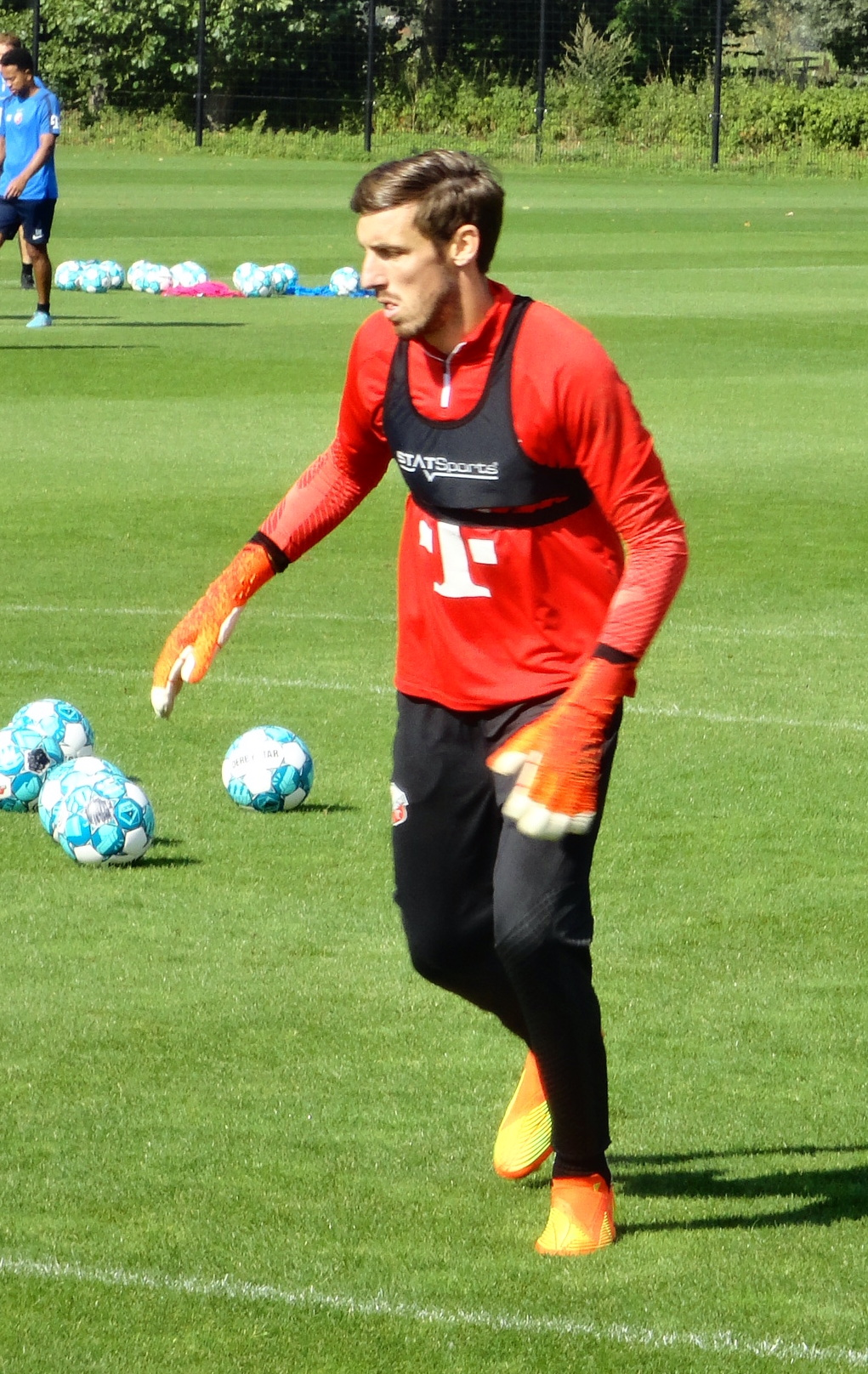
- Barkas in 2022 with Utrecht

Personal information
- Full name: Vasilios Cornelius Barkas
- Date of birth: 30 May 1994 (age 32)
- Place of birth: Athens, Greece
- Height: 1.96 m (6 ft 5 in)
- Position: Goalkeeper

Team information
- Current team: Utrecht
- Number: 1

Youth career
- 2006–2013: Atromitos

Senior career*
Years	Team	Apps	(Gls)
2013–2016	Atromitos	13	(0)
2016–2020	AEK Athens	80	(0)
2020–2023	Celtic	16	(0)
2022–2023	→ Utrecht (loan)	34	(0)
2023–	Utrecht	102	(0)

International career^{‡}
2012–2013	Greece U19	6	(0)
2015–2016	Greece U21	8	(0)
2018–2020	Greece	13	(0)
- * Club domestic league appearances and goals as of 18 October 2026 ‡ National team caps and goals as of 12 November 2020

Vasilis Barkas (Greek: Βασίλης Μπάρκας; born 30 May 1994) is a Greek professional footballer who plays as a goalkeeper for Eredivisie club Utrecht and the Greece national team.

== Early life ==
Barkas was born in Athens to a Greek father and a Dutch mother.

== Club career ==
Barkas started football in 2006 when he signed in the academies Atromitos. In 2013, he was promoted to the senior team and signed a professional contract with the club. He made his senior team debut on 20 May 2015 against PAOK, replacing Andrey Harbunow in the 83rd minute. Barkas started the 2015–16 season as the back-up goalkeeper until starting a match against PAOK on 30 January 2016, during which his performance was praised. After that, he became the first-choice goalkeeper of the club. In the summer of 2016, Aston Villa, Olympiacos, PAOK and AEK Athens were interested in signing Barkas, before he signed for AEK on June 9 for a fee of €600,000. As a result, AEK decided to not complete the transfer of Georgian international goalkeeper Giorgi Loria, and instead started the 2016–17 season with Giannis Anestis and Barkas.

=== AEK Athens ===
On 27 November Barkas made his debut for the club in a 3–0 home win against Platanias. On 20 July 2017, Barkas suffered a serious injury during training, when he broke the thumb of his right hand. He was expected to remain out of action for three months, missing the upcoming 2017–18 UEFA Champions League qualifiers against CSKA Moscow, where Anestis was expected to take his place. On 29 November he recovered from his injury taking his place in the team as a starter in a 3–2 away Greek Cup win against Kallithea, after Anestis was frozen out and shared goalkeeping duties with Panagiotis Tsintotas in the Super League while participating in all knockout cup fixtures.

On 7 June 2018, Barkas agreed to a contract extension with AEK, until the summer of 2022. On 22 June, the administration of the team rejected a €6,000,000 offer from Udinese, asking for a minimum fee of €10,000,000. After returning from injury, Barkas' form was a highlight for AEK and he made some very impressive saves in the qualifiers against Celtic and MOL Vidi in the UEFA Champions League preliminary rounds. During his 2018–19 season, Barkas made 41 appearances across all competitions, conceding 34 goals and tallying 22 clean sheets, his best season so far.

On 10 August 2019, Montpellier made two official offers for the Greek international, but AEK rejected both of them, setting a price tag of €8,000,000. In the 2019–20 season, he registered 10 clean sheets in 20 games of the domestic championship, helping AEK recover from a poor start to the campaign.

=== Celtic ===
Barkas signed for Scottish Premiership club Celtic in July 2020 on a four-year contract for a £5 million fee plus future incentives. He made his debut on 9 August against Kilmarnock, replacing Scott Bain, after Celtic's coach Neil Lennon confirmed that he had been training well. On 25 October, Barkas was dropped out of the starting XI, after back-to-back defeats against Rangers and AC Milan, with Bain starting in his place in the 3–3 draw away to Aberdeen. Thereafter, he was soon dropped from the league squad.

During the 2021–22 season, Barkas appeared to become the No.1 under new boss Ange Postecoglou, but poor performances against FC Midtjylland and West Ham resulted in Bain taking the gloves for the Champions League. Joe Hart's arrival pushed Barkas out of the squad. It was expected that Barkas would leave the club in a loan deal, but the summer window closed before a deal could be agreed. On 26 December 2021, with both Hart and Bain unavailable, Barkas made his first league appearance of the 2021–22 season.

==== Loan to Utrecht ====
On 7 July 2022, Barkas moved on loan to Utrecht.

=== Utrecht ===
On 28 July 2023, after Barkas' contract with Celtic expired, Utrecht signed him on a one-year deal, with an option for a further year.

== International career ==
Barkas played for Greece at under-19 and under-21 level, making six appearances for the U19s and eight for the U21s. Οn 4 June 2016, he was called by Michael Skibbe into the Greece national team after Orestis Karnezis was injured for the friendlies against Australia. On 16 March 2018, he was called up by Greece for the friendlies against Switzerland and Egypt in March 2018. On 27 March, he made his debut against Egypt as a second-half substitute.

== Career statistics ==
=== Club ===
As of match played 8 November 2026

Appearances and goals by club, season and competition
Club	Season	League			National cup (Note: Includes Greek Cup, Scottish Cup)		League cup (Note: Includes Scottish League Cup)		Europe		Other		Total	
Club	Season	Division	Apps	Goals	Apps	Goals	Apps	Goals	Apps	Goals	Apps	Goals	Apps	Goals
Atromitos	2013–14	Super League Greece	0	0	0	0	—		0	0	—		1	0
Atromitos	2014–15	Super League Greece	1	0	0	0	—		0	0	—		1	0
Atromitos	2015–16	Super League Greece	12	0	8	0	—		0	0	—		20	0
Atromitos	Total		13	0	8	0	—		0	0	—		21	0
AEK Athens	2016–17	Super League Greece	21	0	1	0	—		0	0	—		22	0
AEK Athens	2017–18	Super League Greece	5	0	8	0	—		2 (Note: Appearances in UEFA Europa League)	0	—		15	0
AEK Athens	2018–19	Super League Greece	26	0	5	0	—		10 (Note: Appearances in UEFA Champions League)	0	—		41	0
AEK Athens	2019–20	Super League Greece	28	0	1	0	—		4	0	—		33	0
AEK Athens	Total		80	0	15	0	—		16	0	—		111	0
Celtic	2020–21	Scottish Premiership	15	0	0	0	1	0	6 (Note: Two appearances in UEFA Champions League, four in UEFA Europa League)	0	—		22	0
Celtic	2021–22	Scottish Premiership	1	0	0	0	0	0	1	0	—		2	0
Celtic	Total		16	0	0	0	1	0	7	0	—		24	0
Utrecht (loan)	2022–23	Eredivisie	34	0	4	0	—		—		—		38	0
Utrecht	2023–24	Eredivisie	31	0	0	0	—		—		—		31	0
Utrecht	2024–25	Eredivisie	31	0	1	0	—		—		—		32	0
Utrecht	2025–26	Eredivisie	33	0	1	0	—		12	0	1 (Note: Appearance in European play-offs)	0	47	0
Utrecht	2026–27	Eredivisie	8	0	0	0	—		—		—		7	0
Utrecht	Utrecht total		137	0	6	0	—		12	0	1	0	156	0
Career total			248	0	29	0	1	0	35	0	1	0	299	0

=== International ===
As of match played 11 November 2020

Appearances and goals by national team and year
National team	Year	Apps	Goals
Greece	2018	7	0
Greece	2019	3	0
Greece	2020	3	0
Greece	2022	0	0
Total		13	0

== Honours ==
AEK Athens

- Super League Greece: 2017–18
- Greek Cup runner-up: 2016–17, 2017–18, 2018–19

Celtic

- Scottish Premiership: 2021–22
- Scottish Cup: 2019–20

Individual

- Eredivisie Team of the Month: February 2025
- FC Utrecht Player of the Year (David Di Tommaso Trophy): 2025
