= Annecy attack =

Annecy attack may refer to:

- Annecy shootings, in 2012
- 2023 Annecy stabbing
