= Anthony Le Tallec =

French footballer (born 1984)

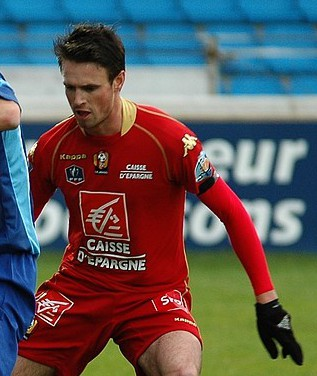
- Le Tallec playing for Le Mans in 2009

Personal information
- Date of birth: 3 October 1984 (age 42)
- Place of birth: Hennebont, France
- Height: 1.85 m (6 ft 1 in)
- Position: Forward

Youth career
- 1992–2001: Le Havre

Senior career*
Years	Team	Apps	(Gls)
2002–2008	Liverpool	17	(1)
2002–2003	→ Le Havre (loan)	25	(5)
2004–2005	→ Saint-Étienne (loan)	10	(1)
2005–2006	→ Sunderland (loan)	27	(3)
2006–2007	→ Sochaux (loan)	25	(4)
2007–2008	→ Le Mans (loan)	0	(0)
2008–2010	Le Mans	96	(19)
2010–2012	Auxerre	52	(8)
2012–2015	Valenciennes	71	(20)
2015–2017	Atromitos	53	(13)
2017	Astra Giurgiu	18	(1)
2018–2019	Orléans	37	(8)
2019–2021	Annecy	17	(2)

International career
2001	France U17	6	(3)
2005–2008	France U21	4	(5)
- * Club domestic league appearances and goals

Anthony Le Tallec (born 3 October 1984) is a French former professional footballer who played as a forward or an attacking midfielder for Liverpool, Sochaux, and Annecy.

== Club career ==
=== Liverpool ===
Born in Hennebont, Le Tallec was signed from Le Havre by Liverpool in 2001, along with his cousin Florent Sinama Pongolle, by manager Gérard Houllier. This was after impressive performances for France at the UEFA European Under-16 Championship and the FIFA U-17 World Cup, with the player being awarded the 'Silver Ball' as the second best player (behind his cousin) in the latter tournament as the national team emerged champions; both players remained a further two years at Le Havre, loaned by the Reds.

After making his Liverpool debut in a league match against Blackburn Rovers, Le Tallec scored his first and only Liverpool goal in a UEFA Cup tie against Olimpija Ljubljana in October 2003. After his return from a loan spell at Saint-Étienne, he also featured in the club's victorious run in the UEFA Champions League, starting in the home leg of the quarter-final tie against Juventus but failing to appear in the squad of 18 for the final itself.

For 2005–06, Le Tallec joined fellow Premier League side Sunderland on loan, in a bid to gain some more first-team football. He stated: "I am a competitor and I want to play all the time, but with Liverpool it was impossible. I chose to come to Sunderland because I need to play every week". In a disappointing season for the club, who finished bottom of the table, he was its top scorer with only five goals in all competitions; this included a goal on his debut against Manchester City and a header against Fulham, helping the Black Cats pick up their only home win.

In May 2006, after Sunderland announced they would not be looking to retain his services, Le Tallec returned to Liverpool but was not given a squad number by boss Rafael Benítez. At the end of the month, he joined up with the French under-21s for the European Championship which took place in Portugal, only featuring in the final group match after the team had already secured qualification and being substituted after 61 minutes.

=== Return to France ===
In August 2006, Le Tallec moved to Sochaux on another loan deal. He won the Coupe de France scoring a late equaliser after coming off the bench in the final, which eventually led to a penalty shootout against Marseille – a fellow Liverpool player out on loan, Djibril Cissé, netted two goals in the match for the opposition.

On 31 August 2007, it was reported that Scottish Premier League club Heart of Midlothian were close to signing Le Tallec. However, the player ended up moving to Ligue 1 team Le Mans, on loan for the entire season with a view to a permanent deal for approximately £1.1 million pounds.

In July 2008, Le Mans decided to make the loan permanent, signing Le Tallec to a four-year contract. On 27 June 2010, following their top flight relegation, he reached an agreement with fellow league club Auxerre for a four-year deal, worth €3 million.

=== Atromitos ===
On 19 July 2015, Le Tallec signed with Atromitos for two years. He cited the possibility of playing in the UEFA Europa League as the main reason for his signature.

=== Later years ===
On 3 July 2017, the 32-year-old Le Tallec joined Astra Giurgiu in the Romanian Liga I. He returned to his country in the following transfer window, moving to Ligue 2's Orléans.

In September 2019, Le Tallec signed with Annecy.

He retired from professional football in May 2021 after a twenty-year career.

== Personal life ==
Le Tallec's younger brother, Damien, is also a footballer. Another French youth international who was groomed at Le Havre, he started his professional career in Germany with Borussia Dortmund.

In June 2023, Le Tallec was a witness to a mass stabbing attack in an Annecy park in which four children and an adult were injured.

== Career statistics ==
As of match played on 6 February 2021

Appearances and goals by club, season and competition
Club	Season	League			National cup (Note: Includes FA Cup, Coupe de France, Greek Football Cup, Cupa României)		League cup (Note: Includes Football League Cup, Coupe de la Ligue)		Europe		Total	
Club	Season	Division	Apps	Goals	Apps	Goals	Apps	Goals	Apps	Goals	Apps	Goals
Le Havre (loan)	2002–03	Ligue 1	30	2					—		30	2
Liverpool	2003–04	Premier League	13	0	4	0	2	0	4 (Note: Appearances in UEFA Cup)	1	23	1
Liverpool	2004–05	Premier League	4	0	0	0	0	0	3 (Note: Appearances in UEFA Champions League)	0	7	0
Liverpool	2005–06	Premier League	0	0	0	0	0	0	2	0	2	0
Liverpool	Total		17	0	4	0	2	0	9	1	32	1
Saint-Étienne (loan)	2004–05	Ligue 1	6	1					—		6	1
Sunderland (loan)	2005–06	Premier League	27	3	2	1	2	1	—		31	5
Sochaux (loan)	2006–07	Ligue 1	25	4	4	3	—		—		29	7
Le Mans	2007–08	Ligue 1	26	5	2	0	3	1	—		31	6
Le Mans	2008–09	Ligue 1	34	6	3	0	1	0	—		38	6
Le Mans	2009–10	Ligue 1	36	8	1	1	2	1	—		39	10
Le Mans	Total		96	19	6	1	6	2	—		108	22
Auxerre	2010–11	Ligue 1	22	1	1	0	1	0	3	0	27	1
Auxerre	2011–12	Ligue 1	24	3	1	0	2	1	—		27	4
Auxerre	2012–13	Ligue 2	6	4	0	0	2	0	—		8	4
Auxerre	Total		52	8	2	0	5	1	3	0	62	9
Auxerre B	2011–12	CFA	2	0	—		—		—		2	0
Valenciennes	2012–13	Ligue 1	20	5	1	0	—		—		21	5
Valenciennes	2013–14	Ligue 1	17	2	0	0	1	0	—		18	2
Valenciennes	2014–15	Ligue 2	34	13	2	0	1	0	—		37	13
Valenciennes	Total		71	20	3	0	2	0	—		76	20
Valenciennes B	2013–14	CFA 2	2	1	—		—		—		2	1
Atromitos	2015–16	Super League Greece	27	7	8	1	—		3 (Note: Appearances in UEFA Europa League)	0	38	8
Atromitos	2016–17	Super League Greece	26	6	4	0	—		—		30	6
Atromitos	Total		53	13	12	1	—		3	0	68	14
Astra Giurgiu	2017–18	Liga I	18	1	2	0	—		4	1	24	2
Orléans	2017–18	Ligue 2	9	1	0	0	—		—		9	1
Orléans	2018–19	Ligue 2	26	7	3	0	4	0	—		33	7
Orléans	2019–20	Ligue 2	2	0	0	0	—		—		2	0
Orléans	Total		37	8	3	0	4	0	—		44	8
Annecy	2019–20	National 2	6	1	2	1	—		—		8	2
Annecy	2020–21	National	11	1	1	1	—		—		12	2
Annecy	Total		17	2	3	2	—		—		20	4
Career total			453	83	41	8	21	4	19	2	534	97

== Honours ==
Liverpool

- UEFA Champions League: 2004–05

Sochaux

- Coupe de France: 2006–07

France U17

- FIFA U-17 World Championship: 2001

Individual

- FIFA U-17 World Championship Silver Ball: 2001
