= Giannis Anestis =

Greek footballer (born 1991)

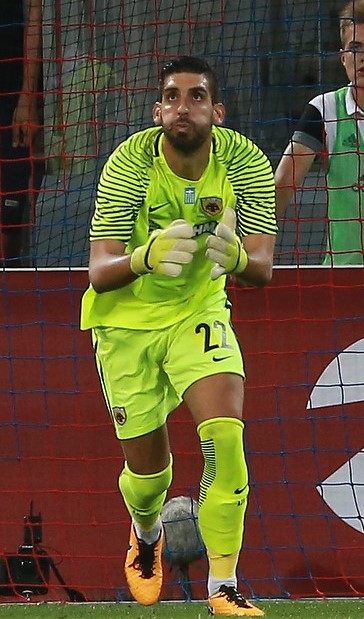

Personal information
- Date of birth: 9 March 1991 (age 35)
- Place of birth: Chalkida, Greece
- Height: 1.98 m (6 ft 6 in)
- Position: Goalkeeper

Team information
- Current team: Botoșani
- Number: 99

Youth career
- –2011: Panionios

Senior career*
Years	Team	Apps	(Gls)
2011–2014	Panionios	17	(0)
2014–2018	AEK Athens	59	(0)
2018	Hapoel Be'er Sheva	0	(0)
2019–2021	IFK Göteborg	88	(0)
2022–2023	Panetolikos	34	(0)
2023–2024	Karmiotissa	13	(0)
2024	AEL Limassol	12	(0)
2024–	Botoșani	73	(0)
- * Club domestic league appearances and goals as of 1 November 2026

Giannis Anestis (Greek: Γιάννης Ανέστης; born 9 March 1991) is a Greek professional footballer who plays as a goalkeeper for Liga I club Botoșani.

== Career ==
=== Panionios ===
He started playing football at Panionios' youth team, and was promoted to the first team in 2011. His first appearance was on 21 April 2013 against Olympiacos in Karaiskakis Stadium. Panionios lost the match 2–1.

=== AEK Athens ===
On 23 January 2014, Anestis signed a three-year contract with AEK Athens for an undisclosed fee, starting at the end of 2013–14 season. He played as the basic goalie in the successful 2014–15 campaign when AEK won the championship and promoted in the Super League. At the summer of 2015, AEK has signed with Venezuelan international goalie Alain Baroja who will start as a first choice for Traianos Dellas squad.

On 21 December 2015 he made his debut with AEK in the Super League as a replacement for the injured Baroja, who suffered a finger injury on December's training and will remain out of action for at least one month. Anestis had played only in Greek Cup so far in the 2015–16 season. In this game he was the negative protagonist as his club due to his mistake suffered a 2–1 home loss against Levadiakos. On 9 January 2016, in his third Super League game, he helped his club to escape with a 2–1 home win against Skoda Xanthi, as he saved Dani Nieto's penalty kick, helping his club to retain second place in the league.

Due to the injury of Vasilis Barkas, he started as the first goalie for the 2017–18 season. The remarkable appearances during the first two months of the season, was a passport to be called by Michael Skibbe in the Greece national team for the upcoming crucial games against Cyprus and Gibraltar. On 20 October 2017, was included in UEFA Europa League's team of the week, after his impressive performance at away draw against AC Milan (0–0). "An inspired goalkeeping performance by Anestis helped keep Milan at bay as AEK managed a goalless draw at San Siro. Anestis made eight saves, produced three high claims, and made four clearances." was written at the official website of UEFA about the 26-year-old.

At the beginning of December, according to various sources, the gap between AEK and Anestis for the renewal of his contract seems to be unbridgeable. The international goalkeeper is free at the end of the season and as a result of this economic dispute with the club's administration remained essentially out of Manolo Jimenez's first team. Anestis currently receives about €140,000 per year, but to renew his contract, his agent has asked for a significant increase in his salary, in the range of €100,000-120,000 for each year in order to renew his contract till the summer of 2021. As a result of his dispute with the administration of the club, he lost his position in the squad for the rest of the season. At the end of the season Olympiacos want to replace the experienced Belgian-Italian international goalkeeper Silvio Proto with the Greek goalie whose current contract with AEK expires in the summer of 2018 and it will not be extended.

=== Hapoel Be'er Sheva ===
Anestis signed with Israeli champion Hapoel Be'er Sheva for three seasons, for an undisclosed fee. On 2 August 2018, after the game against GNK Dinamo Zagreb in the UEFA Champions League second qualifying round, AEK's former goalkeeper has been harshly criticized by the press for his appearance in the 5–0 away loss, and according to reports, the administration of the club even discusses the solution of his co-operation with him.

On 31 August 2018, the club announced that Anestis had been released.

=== IFK Göteborg ===
On 26 November 2018, following an unsuccessful passage from Israel, Anestis signed a contract with Swedish club IFK Göteborg till the summer of 2020 for an undisclosed fee. On 17 February 2019, he made his debut with the club in a 2–0 Svenska Cupen match against Nyköpings BIS. On 15 November 2019, he renew his contract with the club until 31 December 2021 for an undisclosed fee.

== Career statistics ==
As of 1 November 2026

Appearances and goals by club, season and competition
Club	Season	League			National cup (Note: Includes Greek Cup, Svenska Cupen)		Europe		Other		Total	
Club	Season	Division	Apps	Goals	Apps	Goals	Apps	Goals	Apps	Goals	Apps	Goals
Panionios	2011–12	Super League Greece	0	0	0	0	—		—		0	0
Panionios	2012–13	Super League Greece	1	0	0	0	—		—		1	0
Panionios	2013–14	Super League Greece	16	0	1	0	—		—		17	0
Panionios	Total		17	0	1	0	—		—		18	0
AEK Athens	2014–15	Football League Greece	23	0	8	0	—		—		31	0
AEK Athens	2015–16	Super League Greece	11	0	6	0	—		—		17	0
AEK Athens	2016–17	Super League Greece	15	0	9	0	2 (Note: Appearance(s) in UEFA Europa League)	0	—		26	0
AEK Athens	2017–18	Super League Greece	10	0	0	0	9 (Note: Two appearances in UEFA Champions League, seven appearances in UEFA Europa League)	0	—		19	0
AEK Athens	Total		59	0	23	0	11	0	—		93	0
Hapoel Be'er Sheva	2018–19	Israeli Premier League	0	0	—		2 (Note: Appearances in UEFA Champions League)	0	0	0	2	0
IFK Göteborg	2019	Allsvenskan	30	0	3	0	—		—		33	0
IFK Göteborg	2020	Allsvenskan	30	0	6	0	1	0	—		37	0
IFK Göteborg	2021	Allsvenskan	28	0	2	0	—		—		31	0
IFK Göteborg	Total		88	0	11	0	1	0	—		100	0
Panetolikos	2021–22	Super League Greece	13	0	2	0	—		—		15	0
Panetolikos	2022–23	Super League Greece	21	0	0	0	—		—		21	0
Panetolikos	Total		34	0	2	0	—		—		36	0
Karmiotissa	2023–24	Cypriot First Division	13	0	0	0	—		—		13	0
AEL Limassol	2023–24	Cypriot First Division	12	0	1	0	—		—		13	0
Botoșani	2024–25	Liga I	28	0	0	0	—		—		28	0
Botoșani	2025–26	Liga I	31	0	0	0	—		1 (Note: Appearances in Liga I European play-offs)	0	32	0
Botoșani	2026–27	Liga I	14	0	0	0	—		—		14	0
Botoșani	Total		73	0	0	0	—		1	0	74	0
Career total			296	0	38	0	14	0	1	0	349	0

== Honours ==
AEK Athens

- Super League Greece: 2017–18
- Greek Cup: 2015–16
- Football League Greece (South Group): 2014–15

Hapoel Be'er Sheva

- Israel Super Cup runner-up: 2018

IFK Göteborg

- Svenska Cupen: 2019–20
