= Antonis Magas =

Greek footballer

Personal information
- Full name: Antonios Magas
- Date of birth: 28 February 1994 (age 32)
- Place of birth: Livadeia, Greece
- Height: 1.89 m (6 ft 2 in)
- Position: Centre-back

Team information
- Current team: Aigeas Plomariou

Youth career
- Levadiakos

Senior career*
Years	Team	Apps	(Gls)
2013–2017	Levadiakos	34	(0)
2017–2018	Sparta	5	(0)
2018	Thiva		
2018–2019	Aittitos Spata	14	(0)
2019–2020	Ierapetra		
2020–2021	Asteras Vlachioti	11	(0)
2021–2022	Santorini 2020		
2022–2023	Almyros Gaziou		
2023	AS Rodos		
2023–2024	Ellas Syrou		
2024–	Aigeas Plomariou		
- * Club domestic league appearances and goals as of 18:21, 5 October 2024 (UTC)

Antonis Magas (Greek: Αντώνης Μάγκας; born 28 February 1994) is a Greek professional footballer who plays as a centre-back for Football League club Aigeas Plomariou.

== Honours ==
Thiva

- Boeotia FCA Cup: 2017–18
