= Kyriakos Andreopoulos =

Greek professional football player

Personal information
- Date of birth: 18 January 1994 (age 32)
- Place of birth: Athens, Greece
- Height: 1.79 m (5 ft 10 in)
- Position: Defensive midfielder

Youth career
- –2012: Panathinaikos

Senior career*
Years	Team	Apps	(Gls)
2012–2013	Kalamata	10	(0)
2013–2015	Kerkyra	74	(1)
2015–2016	AEK Athens	0	(0)
2016	→ Kerkyra (loan)	13	(0)
2016–2017	Kerkyra	18	(2)
2017	AEL	1	(0)
2017–2018	Trikala	21	(0)
2018–2019	ZFC Meuselwitz	8	(0)
2019–2025	VFC Plauen	114	(5)

International career^{‡}
2010–2011	Greece U17	17	(0)
2012–2013	Greece U19	11	(0)
2015	Greece U21	8	(0)
- * Club domestic league appearances and goals as of 18 May 2025 ‡ National team caps and goals as of 29 April 2015

Kyriakos Andreopoulos (Greek: Κυριάκος Ανδρεόπουλος, born 18 January 1994) is a Greek former professional footballer who played as a defensive midfielder.

== Club career ==
Born in Athens, Andreopoulos began his career with Panathinaikos youth team, but moved to Kalamata after being deemed surplus to requirements. He did not make one appearance for Kalamata in the league but did manage a cup appearance.

Shortly afterwards he was transferred to Kerkyra for a fee believed to be in the region of €100,000. At the time Kerkyra were in the top tier of Greek football, the Super League Greece. Andreopoulos made one appearance for the club that season in which Kerkyra were relegated to the Football League, Greece's 2nd tier of football. Andreopoulos proved vital in Kerkyra's push for promotion notching up 23 appearances in the league, 2 in the cup where they were knocked out by Panetolikos, and 9 in the promotion playoff in which evidently Kerkyra finished 2nd in meaning they returned to Greece's top flight. In the 2014-15 season Andreopoulos managed 26 appearances scoring one goal.

His appearances caught the eye of AEK Athens who having just been promoted back to the Super League Greece for the 2015–16 season, acquired Andreopoulos for a fee believed to be in the region of €160,000. On 2 July 2015, he signed with a three-year contract with AEK Athens.

On 26 August 2016, after an unsuccessful spell at AEK Athens he signed a two-year contract with Kerkyra.

On 27 July 2017, he signed a three-year contract with AEL for an undisclosed fee.

== International career ==
Andreopoulos played for Greece U17, making his debut in 2010. Two years later he made his debut for the Greece U19s, and on 30 March 2015 his debut for Greece U21.
