= Alain Baroja =

Venezuelan footballer (born 1989)

Personal information
- Full name: Alain Baroja Méndez
- Date of birth: 23 October 1989 (age 37)
- Place of birth: Caracas, Venezuela
- Height: 1.83 m (6 ft 0 in)
- Position: Goalkeeper

Team information
- Current team: Always Ready
- Number: 1

Youth career
- 2005–2009: Caracas

Senior career*
Years	Team	Apps	(Gls)
2009–2020	Caracas	133	(0)
2011–2012	→ Llaneros de Guanare (loan)	29	(0)
2015–2016	→ AEK Athens (loan)	25	(0)
2016–2017	→ Cádiz (loan)	0	(0)
2016–2017	→ Sud América (loan)	32	(0)
2017–2018	→ Monagas (loan)	23	(0)
2018	→ Carabobo (loan)	13	(0)
2020–2021	Delfín	22	(0)
2022–2023	Caracas	65	(0)
2024–	Always Ready	35	(0)

International career^{‡}
2015–	Venezuela	15	(0)
- * Club domestic league appearances and goals as of 21 December 2024 ‡ National team caps and goals as of 24 March 2023

Alain Baroja Méndez (born 23 October 1989) is a Venezuelan professional footballer who plays as a goalkeeper for Always Ready and the Venezuela national team.

== Club career ==
Born in Caracas, Alain debuted for the national team at age 25. Initially second-choice to Dani Hernandez, he soon worked his way up to first-choice and eventually earned his first senior cap following some brilliant performances at club level with Caracas FC.

On 17 July 2015, AEK Athens reached an agreement with Caracas FC for the transfer of Alain Baroja on a one-year loan. The 25-year-old Venezuelan goalkeeper was under AEK Athens radar for a while and as his team, Caracas FC, officially announced his transfer -on a one-year loan- to the Greek club was completed. He started as the indisputable first goalie of the club, till 17 December 2015 when he suffered a finger injury in training and will remain out of action for at least one month. On 13 February 2016, almost two months from his last appearance, he replaced his teammate Giannis Anestis, being the first choice of the manager Gustavo Poyet, in a glorious 1-0 derby win against the undefeated, till that game, champions Olympiakos. On 9 June 2016, the officials of AEK Athens announced that they are not intended to activate the buying clause on Alain Baroja's loan contract and the Venezuelan goalkeeper will return to Caracas FC.

On 24 August 2016, Baroja was loaned to Spanish Segunda División club Cádiz CF, being immediately loaned out to Sud América in Uruguay.

== International career ==
On 1 October 2012, Baroja received his first call-up to the Venezuelan senior side, for a match scheduled to be played against Ecuador on 16 October 2012 for the 2014 FIFA World Cup qualification, but he didn't play. He was called again to play a friendly match against Nigeria but he didn't play either.

Under the new management of Noel Sanvicente, Dani Hernandez was used as first choice goalkeeper in the first 4 friendly games of Sanvicente. In February 2015, there were scheduled 2 matches against Honduras, but because they were out of the FIFA calendar, Sanvicente could only call players from the Venezuelan Primera División for the national team. Baroja was chosen as the starting goalkeeper and finally debuted for the national team at age 25. Venezuela won both matches against Honduras and Baroja's performance was very well received. Baroja started again against Peru on March, a game Venezuela won 1–0 with another good performance of the goalkeeper.

On 10 November 2015, Baroja is doubtful for the games with his national team, but his injury isn't serious enough to worry AEK Athens. Baroja played for a couple of minutes at the end of the game against Asteras Tripolis suffering two-headed muscle injury. The footballer travelled to Venezuela and according to the National team's medical staff his injury isn't too severe.

=== 2015 Copa America ===
On 12 May 2015, Baroja was named in Venezuela's 23-man squad for the Copa America 2015 and assigned the number 1 shirt. Initially second-choice to Dani Hernandez, he soon worked his way up to first-choice following some brilliant performances at club level with Caracas FC and earned his first cap in a competitive match. In the team's opening match of the tournament against Colombia, he kept a clean sheet and stopped a shot from James Rodríguez helping the team's victory. Baroja started the next 2 group games of Venezuela and made a world-class save in the last group match, stopping a header from Brazil's centre-back Thiago Silva. Despite his good performance in the tournament Venezuela was eliminated in the group stage.

== Career statistics ==
=== Club ===
As of match played 21 December 2024

Appearances and goals by club, season and competition
Club	Season	League			Cup		Continental		Other		Total	
Club	Season	Division	Apps	Goals	Apps	Goals	Apps	Goals	Apps	Goals	Apps	Goals
Caracas	2012–13	Venezuelan Primera División	27	0	0	0	5	0	—		32	0
Caracas	2013–14	Venezuelan Primera División	32	0	0	0	2	0	—		34	0
Caracas	2014–15	Venezuelan Primera División	31	0	0	0	4	0	—		35	0
Caracas	2016	Venezuelan Primera División	2	0	0	0	—		—		2	0
Caracas	2019	Venezuelan Primera División	41	0	0	0	8	0	—		49	0
Caracas	Total		133	0	0	0	19	0	—		152	0
Llaneros de Guanare (loan)	2011–12	Venezuelan Primera División	29	0	0	0	—		—		29	0
AEK Athens (loan)	2015–16	Super League Greece	25	0	4	0	—		—		29	0
Sud América (loan)	2016	Uruguayan Primera División	14	0	—		—		—		14	0
Sud América (loan)	2017	Uruguayan Primera División	18	0	—		—		—		18	0
Sud América (loan)	Total		32	0	—		—		—		32	0
Monagas (loan)	2017	Venezuelan Primera División	11	0	1	0	—		—		12	0
Monagas (loan)	2018	Venezuelan Primera División	12	0	—		5	0	—		17	0
Monagas (loan)	Total		23	0	1	0	5	0	—		29	0
Carabobo (loan)	2018	Venezuelan Primera División	13	0	1	0	—		—		14	0
Delfín	2020	Ecuadorian Serie A	10	0	—		2	0	1	0	13	0
Delfín	2021	Ecuadorian Serie A	12	0	—		—		0	0	12	0
Delfín	Total		22	0	—		2	0	1	0	25	0
Caracas	2022	Venezuelan Primera División	35	0	—		6	0	—		41	0
Caracas	2023	Venezuelan Primera División	30	0	—		1	0	—		31	0
Caracas	Total		65	0	—		7	0	—		72	0
Always Ready	2024	Bolivian Primera División	35	0	—		12	0	—		47	0
Career total			377	0	6	0	45	0	1	0	429	0

=== International ===
As of match played 24 March 2023

Appearances and goals by national team and year
National team	Year	Apps	Goals
Venezuela
Venezuela	2012	0	0
Venezuela	2013	0	0
Venezuela	2015	12	0
Venezuela	2016	1	0
Venezuela	2017	1	0
Venezuela	2020	0	0
Venezuela	2022	0	0
Venezuela	2023	1	0
Venezuela	2024	0	0
Total		15	0

== Honours ==
Caracas

- Copa Venezuela: 2013

AEK Athens

- Greek Cup: 2015-2016
