= Alkis Markopouliotis =

Greek footballer

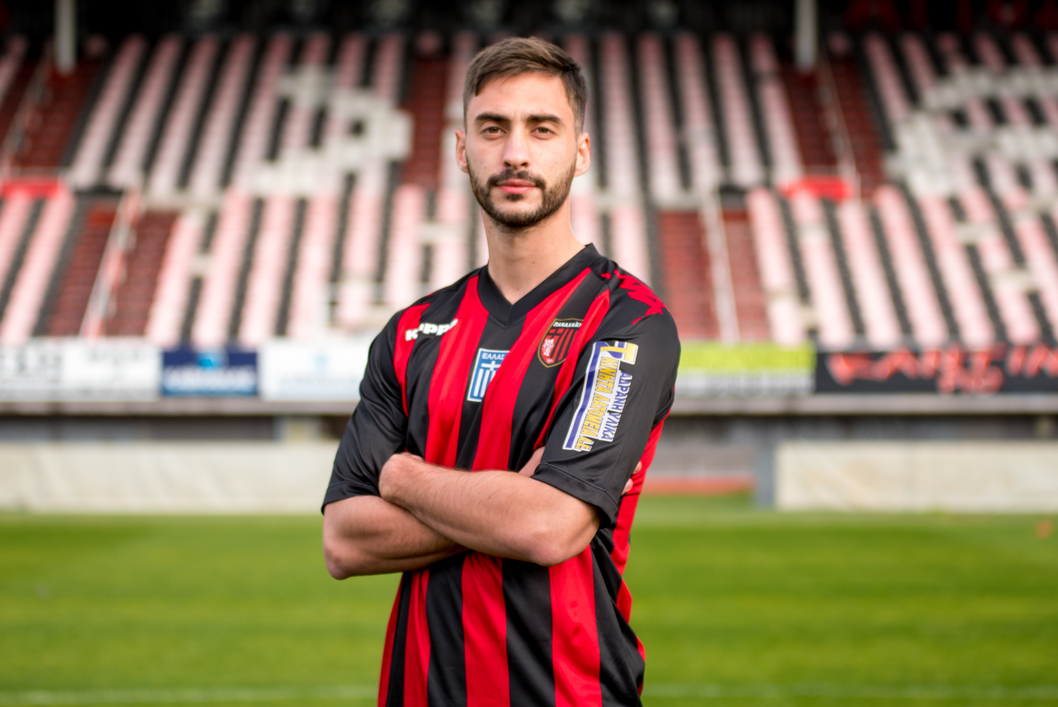

Personal information
- Full name: Alkiviadis Markopouliotis
- Date of birth: 13 August 1996 (age 30)
- Place of birth: Athens, Greece
- Height: 1.84 m (6 ft 0 in)
- Position: Centre-back

Team information
- Current team: Marko
- Number: 4

Youth career
- 2004–2015: AEK Athens

Senior career*
Years	Team	Apps	(Gls)
2015–2019	AEK Athens	0	(0)
2017–2018	→ AO Chania−Kissamikos (loan)	17	(1)
2019–2020	Doxa Drama	15	(0)
2020–2021	Panachaiki	17	(0)
2021–2022	Olympiacos Volos	26	(1)
2022–2023	Proodeftiki	1	(0)
2023–	Marko	39	(3)

International career^{‡}
2015	Greece U19	7	(0)
2017	Greece U21	1	(0)
- * Club domestic league appearances and goals as of March 2026 ‡ National team caps and goals as of 20 December 2017

Alkis Markopouliotis (Greek: Άλκης Μαρκοπουλιώτης; born 13 August 1996) is a Greek professional footballer who plays as a centre-back for Super League 2 club Marko.
