= Antonis Kyriazis =

Greek footballer

Personal information
- Full name: Antonios Kyriazis
- Date of birth: 14 April 1997 (age 29)
- Place of birth: Athens, Greece
- Height: 1.83 m (6 ft 0 in)
- Position: Striker

Youth career
- 2006–2015: AEK Athens

Senior career*
Years	Team	Apps	(Gls)
2015–2017	AEK Athens	0	(0)
2016–2017	→ A.E. Kifisia (loan)	26	(4)
2018–2019	Aris Limassol	8	(0)
2019	→ Ypsonas (loan)	15	(7)
2019–2020	Ypsonas	8	(1)
2020–2021	Proodeftiki	18	(8)
2021–2022	Proodeftiki	7	(0)
2022	Aspropyrgos F.C.	13	(2)
2022–2023	P.A.O. Rouf	16	(2)
2023–2024	Ethnikos Piraeus	29	(5)
2024–2025	Haidari F.C.	24	(10)
2025-2026	Panegialios F.C.	24	(9)

International career^{‡}
2015	Greece U19	2	(0)
- * Club domestic league appearances and goals as of 28 February 2020 ‡ National team caps and goals as of 10 October 2015

Antonis Kyriazis (Greek: Αντώνης Κυριαζής; born 14 April 1997) is a Greek professional footballer who plays as a striker for Gamma Ethniki club Ethnikos Piraeus.

== Honours ==
AEK Athens

- Greek Cup: 2015–16
