= Luiz Brito =

Brazilian footballer

Eduardo Brito
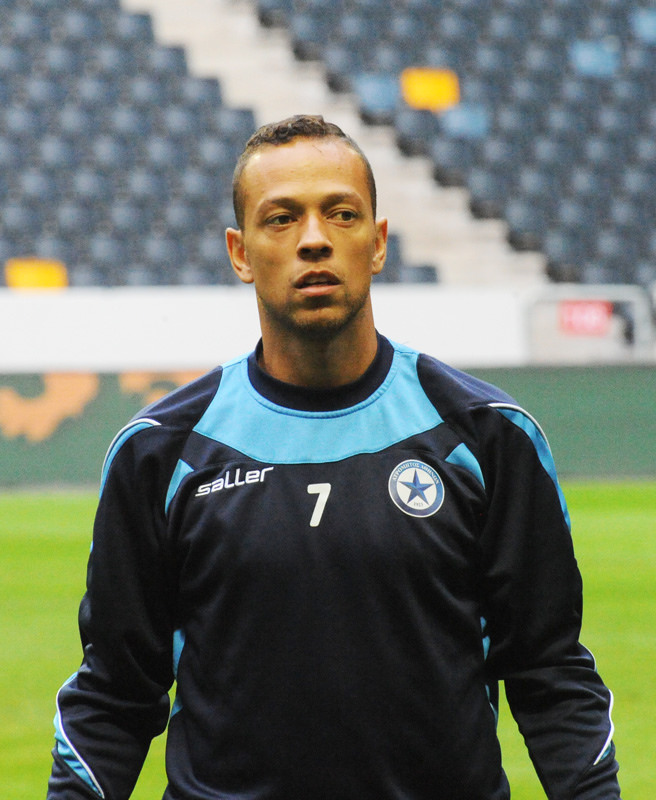

Personal information
- Full name: Eduardo Luiz de Santana Brito
- Date of birth: 21 September 1982 (age 44)
- Place of birth: Rio de Janeiro, Brazil
- Height: 1.78 m (5 ft 10 in)
- Position: Attacking midfielder

Senior career*
Years	Team	Apps	(Gls)
–2004	Jacareí Atlético Clube		
2004–2005	Apollon Kalamarias	6	(0)
2005–2006	Niki Volos	15	(1)
2006–2007	Diagoras	31	(16)
2007–2008	Apollon Kalamarias	25	(4)
2008–2017	Atromitos	253	(34)
2017–2018	Apollon Kalamarias	30	(8)
2018–2019	Aris Limassol	16	(5)
2019–2020	Apollon Pontus	20	(1)
2020–2021	Triglia	10	(1)
Total		406	(70)
- * Club domestic league appearances and goals

Eduardo Luiz de Santana Brito (born 21 September 1982) is a Brazilian former professional footballer who played as an attacking midfielder.

He moved to Greece at the age of 22 and has played for five clubs since he move to Greece. He is a very fast dribbling player and prefers playing on the left side of the attack. He rarely scores but he is good at giving assisting goals for his teammates.

== Career ==
On 20 May 2016, after 8 years with Atromitos, Eduardo Brito signed a contract of additional one year in presence of the technical director Giannis Angelopoulos. Right after commented to atromitosfc.gr the following : "At first I want to express my joy because I feel that am staying at my "home". It is true that my representative received offers from three clubs but I had made my words clear from the first moments that only when my abeyance with Atromitos had ended I would start the process of conversations. In my mind there wasn't any second thought. I have many things to give to the team, we have many things to achieve as a team. Atromitos is my second "home" and I feel it like family. I have a great love relation with our fans. I want to thank the president Mr. Giorgos Spanos for the love that shows to me all these years and also to the technical director Mr. Giannis Aggelopoulos for the support that make me feel important for Atromitos. I want also to thank our coach Mr. Georgios Paraschos for the trust and the team manager Mr. Spyros Sofianos with which I have a great collaboration from 2008, the year that came to the team." On 14 April 2017 he solved his contract with the club. Eduardo Brito had 287 appearances (39 goals, 29 assists) in all competitions with the club.

On 27 July 2017, Brito returned to Apollon Kalamarias for third time in his career, after almost 10 years. The 34-year old Brazilian midfielder signed a year contract for an undisclosed fee. On 24 August 2018, he signed with Cypriot club Aris Limassol, but after six months returned to Apollon Kalamarias for fourth time in his career, signing a year-and-a-half contract for an undisclosed fee.
