= 2023 Annecy stabbing =

Mass stabbing in Haute-Savoie, France

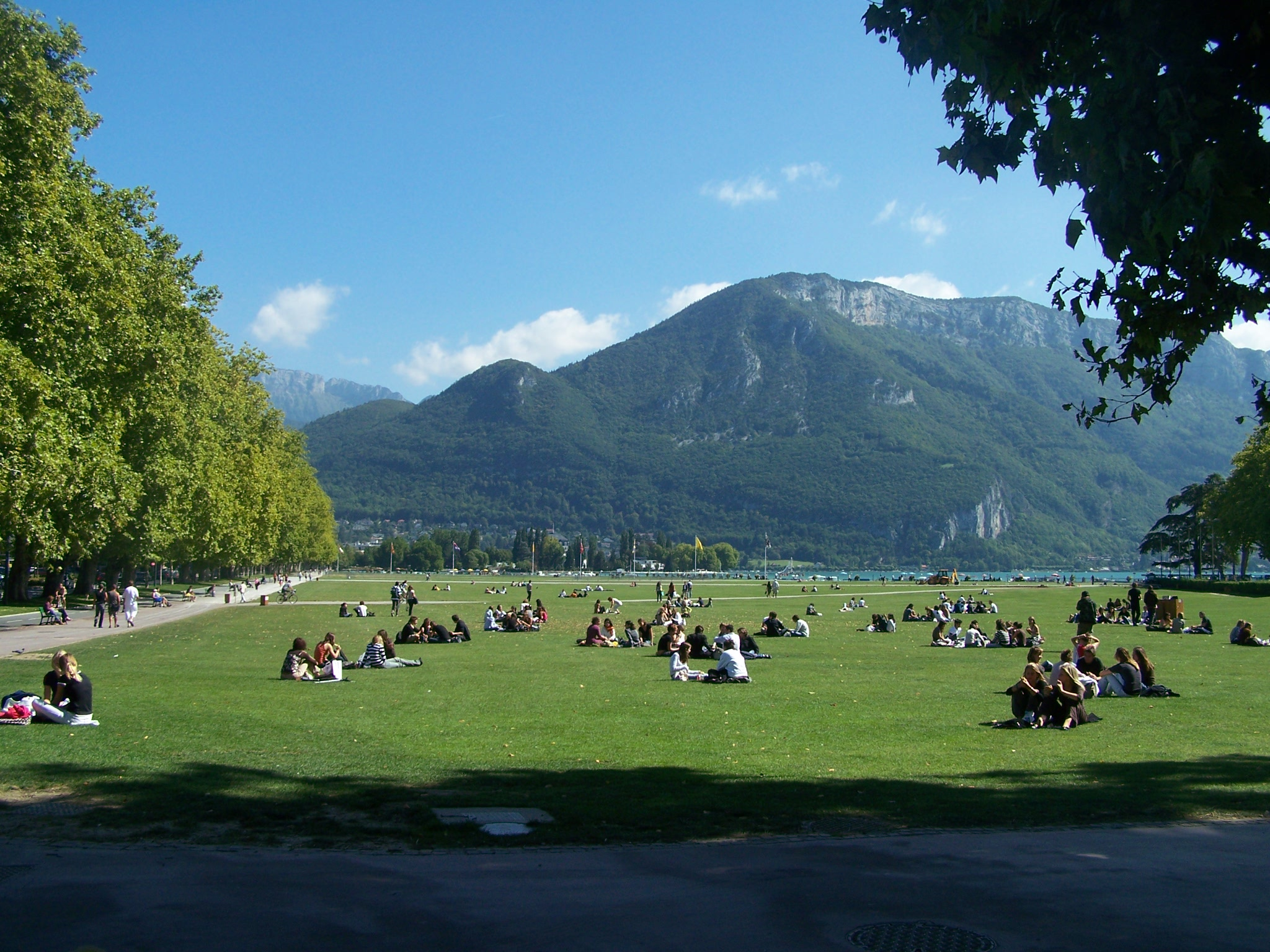
- Location: Annecy, Haute-Savoie, France
- Date: 8 June 2023
- Attack type: Mass stabbing
- Deaths: 0
- Injuries: 7 (including the perpetrator)
- Motive: Unknown
- Accused: Abdalmasih Hanoun

On 8 June 2023, two adults and four young children were injured at Le Pâquier city park, Annecy, Haute-Savoie, France, in a mass stabbing attack. The suspected assailant was arrested by police minutes after the attack.

== Attack ==
At around 9:45 am CEST, a man dressed in black clothing and a keffiyeh, carrying a knife around 10cm long, entered a children's playground in the city park Le Pâquier. The suspect reportedly shouted "in the name of Jesus Christ" during the attack, although local police later stated that the attack had no terrorist motive. The assailant was forcibly stopped by an intervening Catholic pilgrim, Henri d'Anselme (now known as the "backpack hero"), and arrested by police after shots were fired at him. One of the victims, an elderly man, was injured in the shooting.

== Accused ==
The accused was identified as Abdalmasih Hanoun, a homeless 31-year-old Syrian refugee under the asylum of Sweden. He had previously applied for asylum in France, but was denied due to having asylum of another EU country. At the time of application, he had lived in Sweden for ten years, gaining asylum status in April 2023. Prior to the attack, the accused had neither a psychiatric nor a criminal record.

In a press conference on the day of the attack, French Prime Minister Élisabeth Borne stated that the accused had a child around the same age as the children he allegedly attacked. He is married to a Syrian woman who is a naturalised Swedish citizen; he had separated from her around eight months earlier. Both the accused and his partner had been studying to become nurses. According to his unnamed wife, he had left Sweden soon after being refused Swedish citizenship, and had been living in a church in France.

According to Hanoun's mother, who spoke in more detail to AFP, at the beginning of the civil war in Syria, in 2011, her son illegally entered Turkey, where he met his future wife who is also from Syria. The couple then travelled to Greece before settling in Sweden and lived under the same roof for ten years. In 2013 he was granted refugee status and married his partner, who acquired Swedish citizenship. Together they had a daughter, who is now three years old. She said her son suffers from severe depression and claimed to AFP, the refusal of the Swedish authorities to grant him citizenship appears to have "driven him crazy". She also said her former daughter-in-law had said Hanoun was depressed. "He applied for nationality but was rejected," presumably because he had served in the Syrian military, she said, adding "That probably drove him mad."

== Victims ==
Six people, two adults and four children, were attacked. The children's ages ranged from 22 months to 3 years. At least two children and one adult were in critical condition after being stabbed, and were flown to hospitals in Geneva. Both wounded adults are believed to be elderly men.

According to Foreign Secretary of the United Kingdom James Cleverly, one of the children was a three-year-old British national on holiday in Annecy. Another of the children was a Dutch girl.

== Responses ==
A minute of silence was held in the French Parliament to honour the victims of the attack. Prime Minister Élisabeth Borne travelled to Annecy with the Minister of the Interior Gérald Darmanin. British consulate workers were dispatched to Annecy to assist the family of the stabbed British girl. The "hero with backpack", later identified as Henri d'Anselme, was widely hailed in France and was personally thanked by the French President Emmanuel Macron.

== Legal proceedings ==
On 7 October, 2026 French prosecutors issued a statement that Hanoun will be tried "within the next year [2027]... to answer charges of attempted murder in respect of 13 victims, violence with a weapon without total work incapacity in respect of two victims, and armed resistance." The trial will be conducted at Haute-Savoie Assize Court in Annecy.
