= Andrey Harbunow =

Belarusian footballer

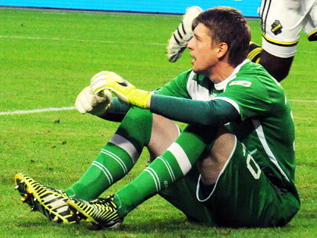
- Harbunow in 2015

Personal information
- Full name: Andrey Alyaksandravich Harbunow
- Date of birth: 29 May 1983 (age 43)
- Place of birth: Mogilev, Belarusian SSR, Soviet Union
- Height: 1.85 m (6 ft 1 in)
- Position: Goalkeeper

Youth career
- 2000–2002: Dnepr-Transmash Mogilev

Senior career*
Years	Team	Apps	(Gls)
2000–2007	Dnepr Mogilev	67	(0)
2000	→ Veino-Dnepr (loan)	3	(0)
2001	→ Spartak-UOR-Dnepr Shklov (loan)	16	(0)
2008–2011	Dinamo Minsk	61	(0)
2011–2012	Neman Grodno	9	(0)
2012–2014	BATE Borisov	57	(0)
2014–2017	Atromitos	76	(0)
2018	Dinamo Minsk	28	(0)
2019–2020	Torpedo-BelAZ Zhodino	6	(0)
Total		323	(0)

International career
2015–2019	Belarus	19	(0)

Managerial career
- 2021–2022: Isloch Minsk Raion (assistant)
- 2023: Arsenal Dzerzhinsk (assistant)
- 2024–2025: Isloch Minsk Raion (assistant)
- 2025: Maxline Vitebsk (assistant)
- 2026–: Aris Limassol (assistant)
- * Club domestic league appearances and goals

Andrey Alyaksandravich Harbunow (Belarusian: Андрэй Аляксандравіч Гарбуноў; Russian: Андрей Александрович Горбунов (Andrey Aleksandrovich Gorbunov); born 29 May 1983) is a Belarusian former professional footballer who played as a goalkeeper.

== Career ==
Gorbunov made his debut for the Belarus national team on 30 March 2015, in a friendly match against Gabon.

On 17 May 2017, he ended his contract with Atromitos F.C. after three consecutive years with the club.

== Honours ==
BATE Borisov

- Belarusian Premier League champion: 2012, 2013
- Belarusian Super Cup winner: 2013
