= 2010–11 AEK Athens F.C. season =

AEK Athens
2010–11 season
- Chairman: Stavros Adamidis
- Manager: Dušan Bajević (until 27 September); Bledar Kola (interim, until 7 October); Manolo Jiménez
- Stadium: Athens Olympic Stadium
- Super League: 4th (After play-offs); 3rd (Regular season)
- Greek Cup: Winners
- UEFA Europa League: Group Stage
- Top goalscorer: League: Ignacio Scocco (10); All: Ismael Blanco (15)
- Highest home attendance: 27,957 (vs Panathinaikos) (24 October 2010)
- Lowest home attendance: 700* (vs Dundee United) (26 August 2010); *The match was held at Karaiskakis Stadium without the presence of the fans of AEK Athens.
- Average home league attendance: 10,348
- Biggest win: Panthrakikos 1–5 AEK Athens; Aris 0–4 AEK Athens; AEL 0–4 AEK Athens; AEK Athens 4–0 AEL; AEK Athens 4–0 PAOK
- Biggest defeat: Olympiacos 6–0 AEK Athens
Home colours	Away colours	Third colours

The 2010–11 season was the 87th season in the existence of AEK Athens F.C. and the 52nd consecutive season in the top flight of Greek football. They competed in the Super League, the Greek Cup and the UEFA Europa League. The season began on 19 August 2010 and finished on 25 May 2011.

== Kits ==
Supplier: Puma
Sponsor(s): Kino
Features: Diners Club, International Service Oil

Home	Away	Third

== Overview ==
The season started without much hope for AEK, as it seemed that they were not able of claiming the championship. Many new players came with the most important being Papa Bouba Diop, along with the return of Dellas and Liberopoulos. There were also quite a few departures, with those of Majstorović and Manduca standing out. Dušan Bajević remained at the wheel of the club.

The Europa League group stage was vital for AEK, as they had not had a good start to the season. In a "convenient" draw for AEK, they came against the Scottish Dundee United. At Tannadice Park AEK, despite their mediocre performance, came away with the win, with a quick goal early in the match. Before the rematch, strange things happened with AEK even being at risk of being zeroed by UEFA. Initially, the possibility of hosting the game at the Olympic Stadium was ruled out, due to the upcoming concert of U2 at the stadium and the error in the maintenance of the pitch, with the turf coming off with the slightest touch. In the search for a stadium for the match, they ended up at the Nea Smyrni Stadium, but the incomprehensible and complex behavior of the ultras of Panionios, who as soon as they learned that their team's ground was chosen, invaded their own stadium at night and caused damages by digging up the pitch, cutting the posts and destroying the irrigation system, making it unfit for a match. In the midst of a heavy atmosphere in AEK and the HFF, Olympiacos, through their vice-president Giannis Moralis, proposed the Karaiskakis Stadium, with the condition that AEK would not print tickets for the game, with the presence of only the Dundee fans in the stadium. Thus, AEK played away from their home, as if they were punished, losing significant income, without being responsible for any of this. Under these circumstances, AEK started strongly the match and scored in the first half. Bajević then decided to experiment with the players during the second half, with the team's performance dropping increasingly and the Scots going up front and taking advantage of AEK's indifference, they equalized and needed just a goal to qualify, which eventually never came. AEK were drawn in Group G along with Zenit Saint Petersburg, Anderlecht and Hajduk Split, where they were eliminated on a draw with Anderlecht, after losing their last game to Zenit, finishing third.

In the league, they started tragically with many defeats in the first 4 matches that led to the removal of Dušan Bajević and the hiring Manolo Jiménez from Sevilla. The new coach started with an emphatic 0–4 against Aris and a victory over Panathinaikos, but the defeat by Panionios the following matchday, ended any hopes of recovery. The rest of the first round was mediocre, as only the victory over Olympiacos stood out. In December, the team moved to their new training complex in Spata. The winter transfer window was disrupted by the free transfer of Djebbour to Olympiacos, after a collision with the coach, while the team were strengthened by the loans of Mateos from Real Madrid and Míchel from Birmingham City, as well as the transfer of Baha from Málaga. The effort in the second half of the season was focused on the cup, as a result of which AEK suffering heavy defeats by Olympiacos Volos with 0–4, a match for which suspicions were circulated about AEK football players being fixed, and by Olympiacos with 6–0. The 4–0 victory over PAOK was not enough to make amends and at the end of regular period, AEK finished in 3rd place.

In the play-offs, AEK started well in the first matches, but in the following games they faced hostile refereeing and the results were not as good. After the match at Panthessaliko Stadium, the president of Olympiacos Volos, Achilleas Beos, who was punished, entered the teams' locker room. Thus, AEK filed an objection citing Beos' illegal entry into the field of play. The disciplinary committee of the league accepted the facts, but rejected the objection, considering that the locker room is not a playing field. In the last game, the indifferent AEK were defeated by Panathinaikos and finished 3rd in the play-offs.

In the cup, AEK eliminated Panthrakikos with an imposing 1–5 and then AEL with 0–4 at their new stadium. The next opponent were Panathinaikos, who welcomed AEK to Olympic Stadium. Nikos Liberopoulos scored twice against his former club and AEK completely dominating the second half did not let their opponent react, with the final 0–2 showing that the qualification cas had been decided. In the rematch, at the side of AEK they expected an easy night to celebrate the qualification to the semi-finals of the institution, especially after the goal from Lagos at the beginning of the match. However Panathinaikos did not give up, equalizing in the 21st minute with Cissé and at the end of the half, they took the lead with Gilberto Silva. Then, the greens continuing offensively, made it 1–3 with Vyntra, getting a qualification score. The ultras of AEK, distraught, invaded the pitch, interrupting the game. With the restart, AEK pressed hard and in the 8th and last minute of stoppage time, won a foul in the center of the field. With all the players of the yellow-blacks, including the goalkeeper, at the opposite area, Míchel attempted something between a long cross and a shot and with Karnezis out of position, he scored an incredible goal and gave AEK the qualification! In the semi-finals, AEK and PAOK faced each other with the first match at the Olympic Stadium finishing 0–0. In the rematch of the Toumba Stadium, AEK imposed the game they wanted and at the beginning of the second half, they made it 0–1 with a header from Dellas. In the 59th minute, a flare from the gate of the ultras of PAOK hit Saja, but the game continued as normal, until the 89th minute, when the ultras of PAOK invaded the field, chasing the players of AEK. The game was interrupted and the players of yellow-blacks eventually agreed to enter the pitch in order to finish the match formally and protect PAOK from severe punishment. Thus, AEK faced Atromitos in the final at the Olympic Stadium. In the game, the yellow-blacks did not start well, but then they gained control with Scocco as their main protagonist, where from a cross of his, Liberopoulos made it 0–1 with a header from an offside position. The game then became a stalemate, with Scocco leaving injured, but AEK managed to take the control of the match and score 2 more goals with Baha and Kafes. From that point on, AEK ultras formed a cordon around the pitch and at a referee's whistle stormed in to celebrate with the game ending without all the minutes of stoppage time being played. This was followed by the inexplicable incidents caused by the ultras of AEK, who were forcefully trying to attack the fans of Atromitos, clashing with the riot police inside the stadium.

== Management team ==
Position	Staff
Manager	(Spain) Manolo Jiménez
Assistant manager	(Spain) Jesús Calderón Malagón
Goalkeeping coach	(Greece) Kostas Kampolis
Fitness coach	(Greece) Dimitris Bouroutzikas
Director of Football	(Iceland) Arnar Grétarsson
Academy director	(North Macedonia) Toni Savevski
Academy manager	(Albania) Bledar Kola
U20 Manager	(Greece) Daniel Batista
U17 Manager	(Greece) Charis Kopitsis
Head of Scouting	(Greece) Vasilios Borbokis
Head of Medical	(Greece) Lakis Nikolaou

== Players ==
=== Squad information ===
NOTE: The players are the ones that have been announced by the AEK Athens' press release. No edits should be made unless a player arrival or exit is announced. Updated 25 May 2011, 23:59 UTC+3.

No.	Player	Nat.	Position(s)	Date of birth (Age)	Signed	Previous club	Transfer fee	Contract until
Goalkeepers
22	Giannis Arabatzis	(Greece)	GK	28 May 1984 (aged 27)	2002	(Greece) Enosi Apostolou Pavlou	€22,000	2013
23	Sebastián Saja	(Argentina)	GK	5 June 1979 (aged 32)	2008	(Argentina) San Lorenzo	Free	2012
27	Milan Lukač	(Serbia)	GK	4 October 1985 (aged 25)	2009	(Serbia) Čukarički	€300,000	2012
28	Theodoros Moschonas	(Greece)	GK	3 December 1990 (aged 20)	2009	(Greece) AEK Athens U20	—	2011
Defenders
3	Cristian Nasuti	(Argentina)	CB	6 September 1982 (aged 28)	2010	(Argentina) River Plate	€130,000	2011
4	Kostas Manolas	(Greece)	CB / RB	14 January 1991 (aged 20)	2009	(Greece) Thrasyvoulos	€50,000	2012
5	Traianos Dellas (Vice-captain 2)	(Greece)	CB	31 January 1976 (aged 35)	2010	(Cyprus) Anorthosis Famagusta	Free	2011
6	David Mateos	(Spain)	CB	22 April 1987 (aged 24)	2011	(Spain) Real Madrid	€80,000	2011
8	Sanel Jahić	(Bosnia and Herzegovina) (France)	CB / RB / DM / LB	10 December 1981 (aged 29)	2009	(Greece) Aris	€590,000	2013
13	Claudio Dadómo	(Uruguay)	LB / LM	10 February 1982 (aged 29)	2010	(Uruguay) Cerro	Free	2012
15	Nikolaos Karabelas	(Greece)	LB / LM	20 December 1984 (aged 26)	2009	(Greece) Aris	Free	2013
17	Anestis Argyriou	(Greece)	RB / CB / DM / RM	20 December 1984 (aged 26)	2010	(Greece) Panthrakikos	€250,000	2014
26	Dino Drpić	(Croatia)	CB	26 May 1981 (aged 30)	2011	Free agent	Free	2011
31	Nikolaos Georgeas (Vice-captain 3)	(Greece)	RB / LB / DM	27 December 1976 (aged 34)	2001	(Greece) Kalamata	€1,500,000	2012
92	Michalis Tsamourlidis	(Greece) (Georgia (country))	LB	22 March 1992 (aged 19)	2010	(Greece) AEK Athens U20	—	2011
Midfielders
1	Pantelis Kafes (Captain)	(Greece)	CM / DM / AM / RM / LM	24 June 1978 (aged 33)	2007	(Greece) Olympiacos	Free	2012
7	Roger Guerreiro	(Poland) (Brazil)	AM / CM / LM / LW / SS	25 May 1982 (aged 29)	2009	(Poland) Legia Warsaw	€250,000	2013
11	Míchel	(Spain)	CM / AM / DM	8 November 1985 (aged 25)	2011	(England) Birmingham City	€175,000	2011
14	Grigoris Makos	(Greece)	DM / CM / CB	18 January 1987 (aged 24)	2009	(Greece) Panionios	€860,000	2014
19	Panagiotis Lagos	(Greece)	LM / LW / LB / CM / DM	18 July 1985 (aged 25)	2006	(Greece) Iraklis	€900,000	2013
21	Papa Bouba Diop	(Senegal)	DM / CM	28 January 1978 (aged 33)	2010	(England) Portsmouth	€300,000	2012
25	Lefteris Intzoglou	(Greece)	DM / CM / RM	3 March 1987 (aged 24)	2010	(Greece) Vyzas Megara	Free	2011
90	Savvas Gentsoglou	(Greece)	DM / CB / CM	19 September 1990 (aged 20)	2006	(Greece) AEK Athens U20	—	2014
Forwards
9	Leonardo	(Brazil)	LW / AM / LM / RW / RM / SS	22 September 1986 (aged 24)	2009	(Greece) Levadiakos	€700,000	2014
18	Ismael Blanco	(Argentina)	ST / SS	19 January 1983 (aged 28)	2008	(Argentina) Colón	€850,000	2011
20	Éder	(Brazil)	SS / ST / RW / AM	9 January 1987 (aged 24)	2010	(Brazil) Flamengo	€150,000	2011
24	Nathan Burns	(Australia)	RW / SS / ST / LW / AM	7 May 1988 (aged 23)	2008	(Australia) Adelaide United	€450,000	2012
29	Georgios Nikoltsis	(Greece)	ST / SS	22 September 1989 (aged 21)	2010	(Greece) AEK Athens U20	—	2013
32	Ignacio Scocco	(Argentina) (Italy)	SS / LW / AM / ST / LM / RW / RM	29 May 1985 (aged 26)	2008	(Mexico) UNAM	€1,500,000	2013
33	Nikos Liberopoulos (Vice-captain)	(Greece)	SS / ST / AM	4 August 1975 (aged 35)	2010	(Germany) Eintracht Frankfurt	Free	2011
39	Nabil Baha	(Morocco) (France)	ST / SS / AM	12 August 1981 (aged 29)	2011	(Spain) Málaga	Free	2011
77	Victor Klonaridis	(Belgium) (Greece)	SS / LW / RW / LM / RM / ST / AM / CM	28 July 1992 (aged 18)	2010	(Greece) AEK Athens U20	—	2012
93	Dimitris Froxylias	(Cyprus) (Greece)	LW / AM / LM / RM / CM	28 June 1993 (aged 18)	2010	(Greece) AEK Athens U20	—	2013
99	Serxhio Abdurahmani	(Albania) (Greece)	ST / SS / RW	17 July 1992 (aged 18)	2011	(Greece) AEK Athens U20	—	2015
Left during Winter Transfer Window
2	Christos Patsatzoglou	(Greece)	RB / DM / CB / CM	19 March 1979 (aged 32)	2010	(Cyprus) Omonia	Free	2011
35	Stamatis Kalamiotis	(Greece)	RB / CB	28 January 1982 (aged 29)	2010	(Greece) AEK Athens U20	—	2012
88	Carlos Araujo	(Argentina) (Spain)	RB / RM	19 November 1981 (aged 29)	2009	(Argentina) Huracán	Free	2012
10	Rafik Djebbour	(Algeria) (France)	ST / SS / RW / LW	8 March 1984 (aged 27)	2008	(Greece) Panionios	€3,200,000	2011

== Transfers ==
=== In ===
==== Summer ====
No.	Pos.	Player	From	Fee	Date	Contract Until	Source
2	DF	(Greece) Christos Patsatzoglou	(Cyprus) Omonia	Free transfer	31 August 2010	30 June 2011	
5	DF	(Greece) Traianos Dellas	(Cyprus) Anorthosis Famagusta	Free transfer	2 July 2010	30 June 2011	
13	DF	(Uruguay) Claudio Dadómo	(Uruguay) Cerro	Free transfer	5 July 2010	30 June 2012	
17	DF	(Greece) Anestis Argyriou	(Greece) Panthrakikos	€250,000	1 July 2010	30 June 2014	
21	MF	(Senegal) Papa Bouba Diop	(England) Portsmouth	€300,000	13 July 2010	30 June 2012	
24	FW	(Australia) Nathan Burns	(Greece) Kerkyra	Loan return	1 July 2010	30 June 2012	
25	MF	(Greece) Lefteris Intzoglou	(Greece) Vyzas Megara	Free transfer	31 August 2010	30 June 2011	
28	GK	(Greece) Theodoros Moschonas	(Greece) Elpidoforos	Loan return	1 July 2010	30 June 2011	
33	FW	(Greece) Nikos Liberopoulos	(Germany) Eintracht Frankfurt	Free transfer	1 July 2010	30 June 2011	
35	DF	(Greece) Stamatis Kalamiotis	(Greece) AEK Athens U20	Promotion	2 July 2010	30 June 2012	
77	FW	(Belgium) Victor Klonaridis	(Greece) AEK Athens U20	Promotion	1 July 2010	30 June 2012	
92	DF	(Greece) Michalis Tsamourlidis	(Greece) AEK Athens U20	Promotion	1 July 2010	31 December 2011	
93	FW	(Cyprus) Dimitris Froxylias	(Greece) AEK Athens U20	Promotion	1 July 2010	30 June 2013	
—	DF	(Greece) Spyros Matentzidis	(Greece) Panthrakikos	€250,000	1 July 2010	30 June 2014	
—	DF	(Greece) Nikolaos Kourkoulas	(Greece) Nea Ionia	Loan return	1 July 2010	30 June 2010	
—	DF	(Spain) Juanfran	(Spain) Levante	Loan return	1 July 2010	30 June 2010	
—	DF	(Greece) Dimitrios Amarantidis	(Greece) Anagennisi Karditsa	Loan return	1 July 2010	30 June 2010	
—	MF	(Canada) Tam Nsaliwa	(Norway) Lillestrøm	Loan return	1 July 2010	30 June 2013	
—	MF	(Ghana) Joseph Agyriba	(Italy) Benevento	Free transfer	1 July 2010	30 June 2012	
—	FW	(Romania) Ilie Iordache	(Romania) Rapid București	Loan return	1 July 2010	30 June 2012	

==== Winter ====
No.	Pos.	Player	From	Fee	Date	Contract Until	Source
26	DF	(Croatia) Dino Drpić	Free agent	Free transfer	14 February 2011	30 June 2011	
39	FW	(Morocco) Nabil Baha	(Spain) Málaga	Free transfer	31 January 2011	30 June 2011	
29	FW	(Greece) Georgios Nikoltsis	(Greece) AEK Athens U20	Promotion	31 December 2010	30 June 2013	
92	DF	(Greece) Michalis Tsamourlidis	(Greece) Kallithea	Loan termination	31 December 2010	31 December 2011	
99	FW	(Albania) Serxhio Abdurahmani	(Greece) AEK Athens U20	Promotion	12 January 2011	30 June 2015	
—	MF	(Greece) Antonis Rikka	(Greece) Olympiacos Volos	Loan termination	31 December 2010	30 June 2013	
—	FW	(Greece) Michalis Pavlis	(Greece) Ethnikos Asteras	Loan termination	31 December 2010	30 June 2011	

=== Out ===
==== Summer ====
No.	Pos.	Player	To	Fee	Date	Source
3	MF	(Netherlands) Youssouf Hersi	(Netherlands) De Graafschap	Free transfer	12 August 2010	
4	DF	(Portugal) Geraldo Alves	(Romania) Steaua București	End of contract	5 July 2010	
5	DF	(Sweden) Daniel Majstorović	(Scotland) Celtic	Contract termination	16 August 2010	
6	DF	(Greece) Georgios Alexopoulos	(Greece) Ergotelis	End of contract	15 July 2010	
8	MF	(Canada) Tam Nsaliwa	Free agent	End of contract	30 June 2010	
11	MF	(Brazil) Gustavo Manduca	(Cyprus) APOEL	End of contract	1 July 2010	
26	MF	(Ghana) Seidu Yahaya	Free agent	Contract termination	4 August 2010	
29	FW	(Hungary) Krisztián Németh	(England) Liverpool	Loan return	30 June 2010	
30	FW	(Romania) Ilie Iordache	(Romania) Pandurii Târgu Jiu	Contract termination	19 July 2010	
34	MF	(Greece) Panagiotis Tachtsidis	(Italy) Genoa	Free transfer^{[a]}	1 July 2010	
87	DF	(Argentina) Nicolás Arce	(Argentina) San Lorenzo	Loan return	30 June 2010	
—	DF	(Greece) Nikolaos Kourkoulas	(Greece) Glyfada	End of contract	1 July 2010	
—	DF	(Spain) Juanfran	(Spain) Levante	End of contract	1 July 2010	
—	DF	(Greece) Dimitrios Amarantidis	(Greece) Veria	End of contract	1 July 2010	

Notes

a. Genoa paid €200,000 to AEK for the player's expenses.

==== Winter ====
No.	Pos.	Player	To	Fee	Date	Source
2	DF	(Greece) Christos Patsatzoglou	(Greece) PAS Giannina	Contract termination	5 January 2011	
10	FW	(Algeria) Rafik Djebbour	(Greece) Olympiacos	Contract termination	21 January 2011	
—	FW	(Greece) Michalis Pavlis	(Greece) Elpidoforos	Contract termination	31 January 2011	

=== Loan in ===
==== Summer ====
No.	Pos.	Player	From	Fee	Date	Until	Option to buy	Source
3	DF	(Argentina) Cristian Nasuti	(Argentina) River Plate	€130,000	31 August 2010	30 June 2011	✓	
20	FW	(Brazil) Éder	(Brazil) Flamengo	€150,000	27 June 2010	30 June 2011	✓	

==== Winter ====
No.	Pos.	Player	From	Fee	Date	Until	Option to buy	Source
6	DF	(Spain) David Mateos	(Spain) Real Madrid	€80,000	31 January 2011	30 June 2011	✗	
11	MF	(Spain) Míchel	(England) Birmingham City	€175,000	21 January 2011	30 June 2011	✗	

=== Loan out ===
==== Summer ====
No.	Pos.	Player	To	Fee	Date	Until	Option to buy	Source
11	FW	(Greece) Michalis Pavlis	(Greece) Ethnikos Asteras	Free	31 August 2010	30 June 2011	✗	
13	DF	(Greece) Dimitrios Koutromanos	(Greece) Anagennisi Karditsa	Free	30 August 2010	30 June 2011	✗	
17	MF	(Greece) Antonis Rikka	(Greece) Olympiacos Volos	Free	1 June 2010	30 June 2011	✗	
92	DF	(Greece) Michalis Tsamourlidis	(Greece) Kallithea	Free	17 August 2010	30 June 2011	✗	
—	DF	(Greece) Spyros Matentzidis	(Greece) Anagennisi Karditsa	Free	30 August 2010	30 June 2011	✗	
—	MF	(Ghana) Joseph Agyriba	(Greece) Diagoras	Free	27 August 2010	30 June 2011	✗	

==== Winter ====
No.	Pos.	Player	To	Fee	Date	Until	Option to buy	Source
35	DF	(Greece) Stamatis Kalamiotis	(Greece) Niki Volos	Free	20 January 2011	30 June 2011	✗	
88	DF	(Argentina) Carlos Araujo	(Argentina) Lanús	Free	22 December 2010	30 June 2011	✗	
—	MF	(Greece) Antonis Rikka	(Greece) Kerkyra	Free	16 January 2011	30 June 2011	✗	

=== Contract renewals ===
No.	Pos.	Player	Date	Former Exp. Date	New Exp. Date	Source
22	GK	(Greece) Giannis Arabatzis	15 June 2010	30 June 2011	30 June 2013	
31	DF	(Greece) Nikolaos Georgeas	27 May 2011	30 June 2011	30 June 2012	
32	FW	(Argentina) Ignacio Scocco	25 November 2010	30 June 2011	30 June 2013	

=== Overall transfer activity ===
==== Expenditure ====
Summer: ▼€1,080,000

Winter: ▼€255,000

Total: ▼€1,335,000

==== Income ====
Summer: ▲€0

Winter: ▲€0

Total: ▲€0

==== Net Totals ====
Summer: ▼€1,080,000

Winter: ▼€255,000

Total: ▼€1,335,000

== Pre-season and friendlies ==
13 July 2010 Friendly	Unirea Urziceni	0–2	AEK Athens	Seefeld
19:00 EEST (UTC+3)	Brandán (yellow card) 42'; Galamaz (yellow card) 84'	Report	Leonardo 31'; Dellas 61'; Argyriou (yellow card) 73'	Stadium: Seefeld Sports Arena

16 July 2010 Friendly	SC Schwaz	0–3	AEK Athens	Seefeld
19:30 EEST (UTC+3)		Report	Blanco 34'; Gentsoglou 38'; Liberopoulos 39'	Stadium: Seefeld Sports Arena

19 July 2010 Friendly	Hapoel Be'er Sheva	0–1	AEK Athens	Seefeld
19:15 EEST (UTC+3)		Report	Argyriou 60'	Stadium: Seefeld Sports Arena

25 July 2010 Sydney Festival of Football	Sydney FC	3–5	AEK Athens	Sydney
05:45 EEST (UTC+3)	Brosque 31' (pen.), 48'; Thiam 88'	Report	Leonardo 30'; Blanco 36'; Manolas (yellow card) 58'; Liberopoulos 60'; Scocco 74'; Kafes 76'	Stadium: Sydney Football Stadium; Attendance: 14,153; Referee: Ben Williams (Australia)

28 July 2010 Sydney Festival of Football	AEK Athens	2–1	Blackburn Rovers	Sydney
11:00 EEST (UTC+3)	Scocco 20'; Liberopoulos 24'	Report	Jones 82'	Stadium: Sydney Football Stadium; Attendance: 9,483; Referee: Peter Green (Australia)

31 July 2010 Sydney Festival of Football	AEK Athens	1–0	Rangers	Sydney
10:00 EEST (UTC+3)	Burns 73'	Report		Stadium: Sydney Football Stadium; Attendance: 15,237; Referee: Matthew Breeze (Australia)

7 August 2010 Friendly	Kallithea	2–1	AEK Athens	Kallithea
20:00 EEST (UTC+3)	Katsaros 6'; Maroukakis 59'	Report	Blanco 70'	Stadium: Grigoris Lambrakis Stadium; Attendance: 3,500; Referee: Iosif Sfakianakis (Athens)

4 September 2010 Friendly	Thrasyvoulos	1–0	AEK Athens	Fyli
20:00 EEST (UTC+3)	Zacharopoulos 33'	Report	Blanco (penalty missed) 89'	Stadium: Fyli Stadium; Referee: Giorgos Chatzis (West Attica)

== Competitions ==
=== Overall record ===
Competition	First match	Last match	Starting round	Final position	Record							
Competition	First match	Last match	Starting round	Final position	Pld	W	D	L	GF	GA	GD	Win %
Super League	29 August 2010	17 April 2011	Matchday 1	3rd	30	15	5	10	46	37	+9	50.00
Super League Play-offs	8 May 2011	25 May 2011	Matchday 1	4th	6	2	1	3	6	6	+0	33.33
Greek Cup	28 October 2010	30 April 2011	Round of 32	Winners	7	5	1	1	17	4	+13	71.43
UEFA Europa League	19 August 2010	16 December 2010	Play-off round	Group stage	8	3	2	3	11	14	−3	37.50
Total					51	25	9	17	80	61	+19	49.02

Last updated: 25 May 2011
Source: Competitions

=== Super League Greece ===
==== Regular season ====
===== League table =====
Pos	Team	Pld	W	D	L	GF	GA	GD	Pts	Qualification or relegation
1	Olympiacos (C)	30	24	1	5	65	18	+47	73	Qualification for the Champions League group stage
2	Panathinaikos	30	18	6	6	47	26	+21	60	Qualification for the Play-offs
3	AEK Athens	30	15	5	10	46	37	+9	50	Qualification for the Play-offs
4	PAOK	30	14	6	10	32	29	+3	48	Qualification for the Play-offs
5	Olympiacos Volos (Note: On 28 July 2011, the Disciplinary Committee of the competition found Olympiacos Volos and Kavala guilty of match-fixing. Therefore the clubs were automatically put at the end of the league table and demoted to the Football League. The decision, however, was lifted on 10 August 2011 after both appealed. Instead of that Olympiacos Volos had 10 points deducted and Kavala 8 for the 2011-2012 season. On 23 August 2011, the Professional Sports Committee stripped Kavala and Olympiacos Volos of their professional licence, due to their chairmen's involvement in the match fixing scandal.) (D)	30	12	11	7	40	28	+12	47	Play-offs and relegation to the Delta Ethniki

Source: Super League Greece
Rules for classification: 1) Points; 2) Head-to-head points; 3) Head-to-head goal difference; 4) Play-offs (neutral ground); 7) Draw.
(Note: Criterion 4 is only used if needed to decide champion, teams for relegation or teams for UEFA competitions).
(C) Champions; (D) Disqualified

===== Results summary =====
Overall								Home						Away					
Pld	W	D	L	GF	GA	GD	Pts	W	D	L	GF	GA	GD	W	D	L	GF	GA	GD
30	15	5	10	46	37	+9	50	9	4	2	22	10	+12	6	1	8	24	27	−3

Last updated: 2011-04-17.
Source: Super League Greece

===== Results by Matchday =====
Round	1	2	3	4	5	6	7	8	9	10	11	12	13	14	15	16	17	18	19	20	21	22	23	24	25	26	27	28	29	30
Ground	A	H	H	A	H	A	H	A	H	A	A	H	A	H	A	H	A	A	H	A	H	A	H	A	H	H	A	H	A	H
Result	L	W	D	L	W	W	W	L	W	L	L	W	D	W	L	D	W	W	L	W	L	L	D	W	W	W	L	W	L	D
Position	10	9	9	13	8	3	3	3	3	4	5	4	4	4	4	4	4	4	4	4	4	4	4	3	3	3	3	3	3	3

Updated to match(es) played on 11 April 2011. Source: slgr.gr
A = Away; H = Home; W = Win; D = Draw; L = Loss; P = Postponed

===== Matches =====
29 August 2010 1	Kerkyra	2–1	AEK Athens	Patras
20:30 EEST (UTC+3)	Lampropoulos (yellow card) 14'; Tsigas 17', (yellow card) 46'; Giantsis (yellow card) 36'; Epstein 54'; Konstantopoulos (yellow card) 88'	Report	Manolas (yellow card) 43'; Djebbour 64'; Burns (yellow card) 90+3'	Stadium: Pampeloponnisiako Stadium; Attendance: 5,222; Referee: Michalis Tsiniaris (Athens)
Note: Change of venue due to unavailability of the Kerkyra Stadium.

12 September 2010 2	AEK Athens	2–0	Panserraikos	Rizoupoli
20:30 EEST (UTC+3)	Djebbour 26'; Kafes 70'; Makos (yellow card) 80'	Report	Leozinho (yellow card) 18'; Diogo (yellow card) 35'; Castro (yellow card) 63'	Stadium: Georgios Kamaras Stadium; Attendance: 11,469; Referee: Apostolos Abarkiolis (Macedonia)
Note: Change of venue due to unavailability of the Olympic Stadium.

19 September 2010 3	AEK Athens	2–2	Asteras Tripolis	Marousi
20:30 EEST (UTC+3)	Nasuti (yellow card) 45'; Djebbour 83'; Scocco 87'	Report	Arrache 44', (yellow card) 50'; Urribarri (yellow card) 78'; Fortounis 81'	Stadium: Olympic Stadium; Attendance: 5,019; Referee: Michael Koukoulakis (Heraklion)

26 September 2010 4	Olympiacos Volos	3–1	AEK Athens	Volos
20:30 EEST (UTC+3)	Sankare 9'; Pliagas (yellow card) 13'; Umbides (yellow card) 74', (goal) 90+1' (pen.); Tomas (yellow card) 81'; Breška 82'	Report	Lagos (yellow card) 12'; Dellas (yellow card) 44'; Liberopoulos 55'; Makos (yellow card) 57'; Djebbour (yellow card) 67'; Manolas (yellow card) 84'	Stadium: Panthessaliko Stadium; Attendance: 8,736; Referee: Anastasios Kakos (Corfu)

3 October 2010 5	AEK Athens	1–0	Skoda Xanthi	Marousi
18:15 EEST (UTC+3)	Leonardo 4'; Scocco (yellow card) 70'; Diop 83'; Kafes 88'	Report	Vallas (yellow card) 16'; Štrba (yellow card) 25'; Vasilakakis (yellow card) 56'; Komesidis (yellow card) 63'	Stadium: Olympic Stadium; Attendance: 10,509; Referee: Andreas Pappas (Athens)

17 October 2010 6	Aris	0–4	AEK Athens	Thessaloniki
20:30 EEST (UTC+3)	Faty (yellow card) 4'; Neto (yellow card) 28'; Ronaldo Guiaro (yellow card) 90'	Report	Lagos (yellow card) 8'; Kafes (yellow card) 10', (goal) 41'; Manolas (yellow card) 27'; Scocco 58', 68'; Burns (yellow card) 81'; Djebbour 90+2'	Stadium: Kleanthis Vikelidis Stadium; Attendance: 12,056; Referee: Anastasios Kakos (Corfu)

24 October 2010 7	AEK Athens	1–0	Panathinaikos	Marousi
20:30 EEST (UTC+3)	Djebbour 4'; Burns (yellow card) 52'; Saja (yellow card) 90+3'	Report	L. García (yellow card) 59'	Stadium: Olympic Stadium; Attendance: 27,957; Referee: Anastasios Sidiropoulos (Dodecanese)

31 October 2010 8	Panionios	1–0	AEK Athens	Nea Smyrni
19:30 EET (UTC+2)	Riera (penalty missed) 33, 50'; Cocalić (yellow card) 34'; Kontoes (yellow card) 58'; Siovas (yellow card) 61'; Macho (yellow card) 66'; Goundoulakis (yellow card) 86'	Report	Nasuti (yellow card) 25'; Argyriou (yellow card) 32'; Dadómo (red card) 36'; Blanco (yellow card) 90+2'	Stadium: Nea Smyrni Stadium; Attendance: 3,044; Referee: Michalis Tsiniaris (Athens)

8 November 2010 9	AEK Athens	3–1	Ergotelis	Marousi
19:30 EET (UTC+2)	Nasuti (yellow card) 27'; Kafes (yellow card) 37', (goal) 44'; Blanco 55'; Guerreiro (yellow card) 68'; Éder (yellow card) 90+2', (goal) 90+3'	Report	Leal (yellow card) 14'; Sarris (yellow card) 19'; Fragoulakis 33', (yellow card) 74'; Roubakis (yellow card) 39'	Stadium: Olympic Stadium; Attendance: 6,712; Referee: Christos Mitsios (Epirus)

13 November 2010 10	PAOK	2–1	AEK Athens	Thessaloniki
19:30 EET (UTC+2)	P. García (yellow card) 37'; Fotakis 45+1'; Cirillo (yellow card) 73'; Boussaïdi (yellow card) 90+1'; Vieirinha 90+2', (yellow card) 90+4'	Report	Djebbour (yellow card) 37'; Nasuti (yellow card) 64'; Leonardo 68' (pen.); Manolas (red card) 78'; Arabatzis (yellow card) 81'; Liberopoulos (yellow card) 88'; Dellas (red card) 90+5'; Makos (yellow card) 90+6'	Stadium: Toumba Stadium; Attendance: 18,453; Referee: Anastasios Kakos (Corfu)

21 November 2010 11	Kavala	2–1	AEK Athens	Kavala
19:30 EET (UTC+2)	Vučićević 14'; Abdoun (yellow card) 32'; Onwuachi 46'; Tomašić (yellow card) 74'; Ducrocq (yellow card) 88'	Report	Scocco (yellow card) 62', (goal) 85'; Kafes (yellow card) 72'; Blanco (yellow card) 82'; Saja (yellow card) 89'; Lagos (yellow card) 90+2'; Nasuti (yellow card) 90+3'	Stadium: Anthi Karagianni Stadium; Attendance: 1,768; Referee: Michalis Tsiniaris (Athens)

27 November 2010 12	AEK Athens	1–0	Olympiacos	Marousi
19:30 EET (UTC+2)	Karabelas (yellow card) 13'; Leonardo (yellow card) 57'; Diop (yellow card) 76'; Blanco 90', (yellow card) 90+1'; Arabatzis (yellow card) 90+5'	Report	Hurtado (yellow card) 32'; Modesto (yellow card) 37'; Dudu (penalty missed) 57	Stadium: Olympic Stadium; Attendance: 24,980; Referee: Anastasios Sidiropoulos (Dodecanese)

5 December 2010 13	Atromitos	1–1	AEK Athens	Peristeri
15:00 EET (UTC+2)	Saganowski (yellow card) 38'; Tatos (yellow card) 48'; Melissas (yellow card) 67'; Anastasakos 89'	Report	Diop (yellow card) 10' (yellow-red card) 40'; Makos (yellow card) 75'; Blanco 85'; Manolas (yellow card) 87'	Stadium: Peristeri Stadium; Attendance: 4,567; Referee: Giorgos Stathopoulos (Achaia)

12 December 2010 14	AEK Athens	4–0	AEL	Marousi
17:15 EET (UTC+2)	Blanco 10', 90+1'; Makos (yellow card) 41'; Manolas (yellow card) 63'; Liberopoulos 83'; Dellas 88'	Report	Canobbio (yellow card) 41' (yellow-red card) 77'; Geremi (yellow card) 63'	Stadium: Olympic Stadium; Attendance: 6,029; Referee: Dimitris Kalopoulos (Thessaloniki)

19 December 2010 15	Iraklis	2–0	AEK Athens	Thessaloniki
17:15 EET (UTC+2)	Katsikas (yellow card) 16'; Dani 41'; García (yellow card) 43'; Papasterianos 58', (yellow card) 59'	Report	Diop (yellow card) 45'; Kafes (yellow card) 52'; Dellas (yellow card) 86'	Stadium: Kaftanzoglio Stadium; Attendance: 7,328; Referee: Andreas Pappas (Athens)

5 January 2011 16	AEK Athens	0–0	Kerkyra	Marousi
17:15 EET (UTC+2)	Blanco (yellow card) 58'; Kafes (yellow card) 76'	Report	Majstorović (yellow card) 70'; Paraskevaidis (yellow card) 76'; Makris (yellow card) 86'	Stadium: Olympic Stadium; Attendance: 5,471; Referee: Michalis Voskakis (Rethymno)

9 January 2011 17	Panserraikos	1–3	AEK Athens	Serres
17:15 EET (UTC+2)	Georgiadis (yellow card) 8', (goal) 44'; Papazoglou (yellow card) 40'; Beljić (yellow card) 51'	Report	Blanco 9'; Georgeas (yellow card) 17'; Liberopoulos 38', 82' (pen.); Karabelas (yellow card) 59'; Manolas (yellow card) 75'	Stadium: Serres Municipal Stadium; Attendance: 3,309; Referee: Athanasios Giachos (Chios)

16 January 2011 18	Asteras Tripolis	0–3	AEK Athens	Tripoli
17:15 EET (UTC+2)	Pulido (yellow card) 73'	Report	Scocco (yellow card) 19', (goal) 76' (pen.); Karabelas (yellow card) 24'; Liberopoulos 47'; Blanco 56'; Jahić (yellow card) 73'; Dellas (yellow card) 90+4'	Stadium: Asteras Tripolis Stadium; Attendance: 3,028; Referee: Anastasios Kakos (Corfu)

22 January 2011 19	AEK Athens	0–4	Olympiacos Volos	Marousi
19:00 EET (UTC+2)	Makos (yellow card) 44'; Karabelas (yellow card) 44'; Dellas (yellow card) 45'; Argyriou (yellow card) 66'	Report	Sankare 11'; Umbides 19'; Solakis (yellow card) 45+3'; Álvarez (yellow card) 50'; Rokas (yellow card) 55'; Kapetanos (yellow card) 60', (goal) 80'; Monje 61'	Stadium: Olympic Stadium; Attendance: 7,896; Referee: Stavros Mantalos (Athens)

29 January 2011 20	Skoda Xanthi	0–2	AEK Athens	Xanthi
19:30 EET (UTC+2)	Marcelinho (yellow card) 29'; Vallas (yellow card) 65'; Quintana (yellow card) 86'	Report	Leonardo 3', (yellow card) 29'; Liberopoulos 26', (yellow card) 36'; Lagos (yellow card) 75'; Éder (yellow card) 79'	Stadium: Skoda Xanthi Arena; Attendance: 1,891; Referee: Athanasios Giachos (Chios)

5 February 2011 21	AEK Athens	1–2	Aris	Marousi
19:30 EET (UTC+2)	Mateos (yellow card) 33' (yellow-red card) 90+3'; Blanco 51'; Scocco (yellow card) 76'; Gentsoglou (yellow card) 79'	Report	Neto 29', 75'; Sakata (yellow card) 45'; Toja (yellow card) 54'; Faty (yellow card) 88'; Sifakis (yellow card) 90+1'	Stadium: Olympic Stadium; Attendance: 7,784; Referee: Dimitris Thanos (Grevena)

13 February 2011 22	Panathinaikos	3–1	AEK Athens	Marousi
19:30 EET (UTC+2)	Simão (yellow card) 33'; Leto (yellow card) 40'; Katsouranis 44'; Vyntra 51'; Cissé 75'; Dimoutsos (yellow card) 90+3'	Report	Míchel (yellow card) 12'; Diop (yellow card) 36'; Dellas (yellow card) 37'; Scocco 58'	Stadium: Olympic Stadium; Attendance: 37,258; Referee: Vasilis Paboridis (Kilkis)

20 February 2011 23	AEK Athens	1–1	Panionios	Marousi
19:30 EET (UTC+2)	Makos (yellow card) 43'; Liberopoulos 45+1'; Kafes (yellow card) 78'	Report	Omo (yellow card) 78'; Kumordzi (yellow card) 81'; Mitroglou 89'	Stadium: Olympic Stadium; Attendance: Behind closed doors Referee: Stavros Mantalos (Athens)

27 February 2011 24	Ergotelis	2–3	AEK Athens	Heraklion
17:15 EET (UTC+2)	Leal 60' (pen.); Fragoulakis (yellow card) 76', (goal) 90+8'	Report	Blanco 36'; Manolas (yellow card) 38' (yellow-red card) 58'; Burns 49'; Kafes (yellow card) 58'; Mateos (yellow card) 61'; Karabelas (yellow card) 81'; Georgeas 90+4', (yellow card) 90+5'; Lagos (yellow card) 90+7'	Stadium: Pankritio Stadium; Attendance: 2,921; Referee: Petros Konstantineas (Messinia)

6 March 2011 25	AEK Athens	4–0	PAOK	Marousi
19:30 EET (UTC+2)	Diop 11'; Scocco 35', 55'; Karabelas (yellow card) 66'; Dellas 79'	Report	Sznaucner (yellow card) 8'; Cirillo (yellow card) 69'	Stadium: Olympic Stadium; Attendance: 5,518; Referee: Stavros Tritsonis (Athens)

13 March 2011 26	AEK Athens	1−0	Kavala	Marousi
17:15 EET (UTC+2)	Manolas (yellow card) 23'; Gentsoglou (yellow card) 51'; Dadómo (yellow card) 80'; Scocco 88', (yellow card) 90+3'; Míchel (yellow card) 90+4'	Report	Cardozo (yellow card) 8' (yellow-red card) 53'; Douglão (yellow card) 64'	Stadium: Olympic Stadium; Attendance: 8,157; Referee: Dimitris Thanos (Grevena)

20 March 2011 27	Olympiacos	6–0	AEK Athens	Piraeus
19:00 EET (UTC+2)	Djebbour 2', 61', (yellow card) 63'; Mellberg 7'; Fuster 19'; Ibagaza (yellow card) 23'; Mirallas 68'; Holebas 71', (yellow card) 72'; Riera (yellow card) 74'	Report		Stadium: Karaiskakis Stadium; Attendance: 27,880; Referee: Vasilis Paboridis (Kilkis)

3 April 2011 28	AEK Athens	1–0	Atromitos	Marousi
19:00 EEST (UTC+3)	Guerreiro 33'; Georgeas (yellow card) 59'; Míchel (yellow card) 65'; Liberopoulos (yellow card) 72'; Jahić (yellow card) 77'	Report	Skondras (yellow card) 54'; Sarmiento (yellow card) 64' (yellow-red card) 83'; Baszczyński (yellow card) 77'; Oliveira (yellow card) 82'	Stadium: Olympic Stadium; Attendance: 5,159; Referee: Stavros Mantalos (Athens)

10 April 2011 29	AEL	2–3	AEK Athens	Larissa
19:00 EEST (UTC+3)	Metin 44'; Cousin 61'; Venetidis (yellow card) 68' (red card) 81'; Tshibamba (yellow card) 90'	Report	Manolas 2'; Lagos 4', 18'; Diop (yellow card) 71'; Nasuti (yellow card) 79'; Georgeas (yellow card) 85'; Karabelas (yellow card) 88'; Liberopoulos (yellow card) 90+5'	Stadium: AEL FC Arena; Attendance: 5,691; Referee: Michalis Tsiniaris (Athens)

17 April 2011 30	AEK Athens	0–0	Iraklis	Marousi
19:00 EEST (UTC+3)		Report	Josemi (yellow card) 76'	Stadium: Olympic Stadium; Attendance: Behind closed doors Referee: Christos Mitsios (Epirus)

==== Play-offs ====
===== Table =====
Pos	Team	Pld	W	D	L	GF	GA	GD	Pts	Qualification
2	Panathinaikos	6	3	1	2	9	5	+4	13	Qualification for the Champions League third qualifying round
3	PAOK	6	4	0	2	11	8	+3	12	Qualification for the Europa League third qualifying round
4	AEK Athens	6	2	1	3	6	6	0	8	Qualification for the Europa League play-off round (Note: AEK Athens have won the 2010–11 Greek Football Cup and are therefore qualified for the playoff round of the 2011–12 UEFA Europa League. As a consequence, the fourth-placed team of this group also entered the Europa League.)
5	Olympiacos Volos	6	2	0	4	5	12	−7	6	Qualification for the Europa League second qualifying round

Source: Super League Greece: Standings and Schedule
Rules for classification: 1) points; 2) head-to-head points; 3) head-to-head goal difference; 4) head-to-head goals scored; 5) goal difference; 6) number of goals scored.

===== Results summary =====
Overall								Home						Away					
Pld	W	D	L	GF	GA	GD	Pts	W	D	L	GF	GA	GD	W	D	L	GF	GA	GD
6	2	1	3	6	6	0	8	2	0	1	4	2	+2	0	1	2	2	4	−2

Last updated: 2011-05-25.
Source: Super League Greece

===== Results by Matchday =====
Round	1	2	3	4	5	6
Ground	H	A	H	A	A	H
Result	W	D	W	L	L	L
Position	2	3	2	2	3	4

Updated to match(es) played on 25 May 2011. Source: slgr.gr
A = Away; H = Home; W = Win; D = Draw; L = Loss; P = Postponed

===== Matches =====
8 May 2011 1	AEK Athens	1–0	Olympiacos Volos	Marousi
21:45 EEST (UTC+3)	Dellas (yellow card) 33'; Makos (yellow card) 33'; Leonardo 38' (pen.), (yellow card) 39'	Report	Rokas (yellow card) 22'; Monje (yellow card) 33'; Szélesi (yellow card) 48'	Stadium: Olympic Stadium; Attendance: 5,705; Referee: Dimitris Thanos (Grevena)

12 May 2011 2	Panathinaikos	1–1	AEK Athens	Marousi
21:45 EEST (UTC+3)	Blanco 24' (o.g.); Cissé (yellow card) 34'	Report	Leonardo 2'; Blanco (yellow card) 33'	Stadium: Olympic Stadium; Attendance: 8,831; Referee: Michalis Tsiniaris (Athens)

15 May 2011 3	AEK Athens	3–0	PAOK	Marousi
18:15 EEST (UTC+3)	Dellas 21'; Diop 47', 68'; Scocco (yellow card) 66'; Míchel (yellow card) 77'	Report	Contreras (yellow card) 34'	Stadium: Olympic Stadium; Attendance: Behind closed doors Referee: Stavros Mantalos (Athens)

18 May 2011 4	PAOK	2–1	AEK Athens	Thessaloniki
19:30 EEST (UTC+3)	García 29', (red card) 90+3'; Vitolo 37' (pen.); Etto (yellow card) 67'; Malezas (yellow card) 70'; Lino (yellow card) 73'	Report	Scocco 14'; Diop (yellow card) 27'; Saja (yellow card) 36'; Makos (yellow card) 45+1' (yellow-red card) 73'; Georgeas (yellow card) 58'	Stadium: Toumba Stadium; Attendance: 19,075; Referee: Anastasios Sidiropoulos (Dodecanese)

22 May 2011 5	Olympiacos Volos	1–0	AEK Athens	Volos
20:30 EEST (UTC+3)	Monje (yellow card) 13'; Sankaré (yellow card) 44'; Zaradoukas (yellow card) 65'; Mitropoulos (yellow card) 81'; Dolezaj 84'	Report	Karabelas (yellow card) 54'; Míchel (yellow card) 78'; Dellas (yellow card) 83'	Stadium: Panthessaliko Stadium; Attendance: 5,422; Referee: Petros Konstantineas (Messinia)
Note: After the end of the game AEK filed an objection for the match due to the entrance of the punished president of Olympiacos Volos, Achilleas Beos in the dressing rooms, which eventually was dismissed.

25 May 2011 6	AEK Athens	0–2	Panathinaikos	Marousi
20:30 EEST (UTC+3)		Report	Sarriegi (yellow card) 34'; Cissé 58', 67'	Stadium: Olympic Stadium; Attendance: Behind closed doors Referee: Stavros Tritsonis (Athens)

=== Greek Cup ===
AEK entered the Greek Cup at the Round of 32.

==== Matches ====
28 October 2010 Round of 32	Panthrakikos	1–5	AEK Athens	Komotini
16:00 EEST (UTC+3)	Barboudis (yellow card) 7'; Simosis 18'; Natsouras (yellow card) 41'	Report	Kalamiotis (yellow card) 17'; Blanco 33', 42' (pen.), 69'; Karabelas 73'; Leonardo 85'	Stadium: Komotini Stadium; Attendance: 3,000; Referee: Athanasios Giachos (Chios)

23 December 2010 Round of 16	AEL	0–4	AEK Athens	Larissa
20:00 EET (UTC+2)	Cousin (yellow card) 67'; Tavlaridis (yellow card) 75'	Report	Blanco 38'; Georgeas 53'; Makos (yellow card) 57'; Burns (yellow card) 59'; Djebbour 76'; Manolas 86'	Stadium: AEL FC Arena; Attendance: 10,000; Referee: Giorgos Stathopoulos (Achaea)

===== Quarter-finals =====
19 January 2011 First leg	Panathinaikos	0–2	AEK Athens	Marousi
21:00 EET (UTC+2)	Spyropoulos (yellow card) 18'	Report	Makos (yellow card) 15'; Scocco (yellow card) 24'; Liberopoulos (yellow card) 32', (goal) 65', 80'; Guerreiro (yellow card) 55'; Jahić (yellow card) 66'	Stadium: Olympic Stadium; Attendance: 37,280; Referee: Dimitris Kalopoulos (Macedonia)

2 February 2011 Second leg	AEK Athens	2–3 (4–3 agg.)	Panathinaikos	Marousi
21:00 EET (UTC+2)	Lagos 12'; Jahić (yellow card) 43'; Míchel 90+8'	Report	Leto (yellow card) 11'; Vyntra (yellow card) 23' (yellow-red card) 73', (goal) 63'; Cissé 21'; Gilberto Silva 45'; Spyropoulos (yellow card) 71'; Marinos (yellow card) 85'	Stadium: Olympic Stadium; Attendance: 12,411; Referee: Andreas Pappas (Athens)
Note: The match was interrupted for 3 minutes at the 63rd minute, due to an invasion on the pitch by the ultras of AEK.

===== Semi-finals =====
2 March 2011 First leg	AEK Athens	0–0	PAOK	Marousi
21:00 EET (UTC+2)	Lino (yellow card) 21' (yellow-red card) 74'; Ivić (yellow card) 55' (yellow-red card) 77'; Cirillo (yellow card) 64'	Report	Karabelas (yellow card) 36'; Míchel (yellow card) 90+2'	Stadium: Olympic Stadium; Attendance: 16,928; Referee: Anastasios Sidiropoulos (Dodecanese)

16 March 2011 Second leg	PAOK	0–1 (0–1 agg.)	AEK Athens	Thessaloniki
21:00 EET (UTC+2)	Muslimović (yellow card) 64'; Vitolo (yellow card) 75'	Report	Liberopoulos (yellow card) 20'; Scocco (yellow card) 39'; Dellas 48'; Lagos (yellow card) 70'; Makos (yellow card) 79'; Guerreiro (yellow card) 86'	Stadium: Toumba Stadium; Attendance: 23,105; Referee: Stavros Mantalos (Athens)
Note: In the 59th minute, a flare was thrown from the stand of the PAOK ultras and hit Saha in the back and burned his shirt, with the game restarting normally. In the 89th minute, PAOK ultras invaded the pitch chasing the players of AEK and the match was interrupted for about 25 minutes. Afterwards the players came to the pitch, where the referee whistled the restart of the match and after about 10 seconds whistled its end.

===== Final =====
30 April 2011 Final	Atromitos	0–3	AEK Athens	Marousi
20:30 EEST (UTC+3)	Skondras (yellow card) 25'; Nebegleras (yellow card) 43'	Report	Makos (yellow card) 25'; Liberopoulos 28', (yellow card) 29'; Diop (yellow card) 64'; Baha 78'; Kafes 85', (yellow card) 89'	Stadium: Olympic Stadium; Attendance: 50,912; Referee: Anastasios Kakos (Corfu)
Note: The match ended before the completion of the entire stoppage time, due to the pitch invasion by the ultras of AEK.

=== UEFA Europa League ===
==== Play-off round ====
The draw for the play-off round was held on 6 August 2010.

19 August 2010 First leg	Dundee United (Scotland)	0–1	(Greece) AEK Athens	Dundee, Scotland
21:00 EEST (UTC+3)	Conway (yellow card) 18'; Buaben (yellow card) 50'; Kenneth (yellow card) 90+2'	Report	Djebbour 11'; Scocco (yellow card) 31'; Liberopoulos (yellow card) 41'; Makos (yellow card) 74'; Dellas (yellow card) 84'	Stadium: Tannadice Park; Attendance: 12,116; Referee: Marijo Strahonja (Croatia)

26 August 2010 Second leg	AEK Athens (Greece)	1–1 (2–1 agg.)	(Scotland) Dundee United	Piraeus, Greece
20:00 EEST (UTC+3)	Lagos (yellow card) 16'; Diop 23'; Jahić (yellow card) 26'; Makos (yellow card) 90+1'; Saja (yellow card) 90+2'	Report	Dixon (yellow card) 52'; Daly 78'	Stadium: Karaiskakis Stadium; Attendance: 700; Referee: Libor Kovařik (Czech Republic)
Note: AEK Athens used Karaiskakis Stadium as their home ground, due to the unsuitability of the Olympic Stadium because of the quality of its turf, with UEFA deciding in the match taking place without their fans.

==== Group stage ====
The draw for the group stage was held on 27 August 2010.

Pos	Team	Pld	W	D	L	GF	GA	GD	Pts	Qualification	ZNT	AND	AEK	HAJ
1	(Russia) Zenit Saint Petersburg	6	6	0	0	18	6	+12	18	Advance to knockout phase	—	3–1	4–2	2–0
2	(Belgium) Anderlecht	6	2	1	3	8	8	0	7	Advance to knockout phase	1–3	—	3–0	2–0
3	(Greece) AEK Athens	6	2	1	3	9	13	−4	7		0–3	1–1	—	3–1
4	(Croatia) Hajduk Split	6	1	0	5	5	13	−8	3		2–3	1–0	1–3	—

Source: Soccerway

===== Matches =====
16 September 2010 1	AEK Athens (Greece)	3–1	(Croatia) Hajduk Split	Athens, Greece
22:05 EEST (UTC+3)	Djebbour 12', (penalty missed) 46'; Diop (yellow card) 28'; Liberopoulos 65'; Scocco 89'	Report	Ibričić 29' (pen.); Strinić (yellow card) 58'	Stadium: Olympic Stadium; Attendance: 16,182; Referee: Bas Nijhuis (Netherlands)

30 September 2010 2	Zenit Saint Petersburg (Russia)	4–2	(Greece) AEK Athens	Saint Petersburg, Russia
20:00 EEST (UTC+3)	Hubočan 1'; Alves 13'; Lazović 43' (pen.), 57'; Malafeev (yellow card) 81'	Report	Liberopoulos 37'; Nasuti (red card) 41'; Kafes (yellow card) 43', (goal) 83' (pen.); Makos (yellow card) 84'	Stadium: Petrovsky Stadium; Attendance: 21,100; Referee: Milorad Mažić (Serbia)

21 October 2010 3	Anderlecht (Belgium)	3–0	(Greece) AEK Athens	Brussels, Belgium
20:00 EEST (UTC+3)	Boussoufa 31'; Lukaku (yellow card) 48', (goal) 71'; Juhász 75'	Report	Makos (yellow card) 23'; Argyriou (yellow card) 50'; Lagos (yellow card) 83'	Stadium: Constant Vanden Stock Stadium; Attendance: 14,508; Referee: Hannes Kaasik (Estonia)

4 November 2010 4	AEK Athens (Greece)	1–1	(Belgium) Anderlecht	Athens, Greece
22:05 EET (UTC+2)	Gentsoglou (yellow card) 12'; Leonardo (yellow card) 45+3'; Blanco 48' (pen.)	Report	Polák 55'; Kanu (yellow card) 80'; Legear (yellow card) 81'	Stadium: Olympic Stadium; Attendance: 11,311; Referee: Sascha Kever (Switzerland)

1 December 2010 5	Hajduk Split (Croatia)	1–3	(Greece) AEK Athens	Split, Croatia
20:00 EET (UTC+2)	Maloča (yellow card) 11'; Buljat (yellow card) 30', (goal) 90'; Ljubičić (yellow card) 36'; Jozinović (yellow card) 53'; Ibričić (yellow card) 88'	Report	Gentsoglou (yellow card) 31'; Scocco 50' (pen.); Manolas 61'; Blanco 84'	Stadium: Stadion Poljud; Attendance: 13,726; Referee: Mike Dean (England)

16 December 2010 6	AEK Athens (Greece)	0–3	(Russia) Zenit Saint Petersburg	Athens, Greece
22:05 EET (UTC+2)	Manolas (yellow card) 37'; Blanco (penalty missed) 40'; Makos (yellow card) 72'	Report	Bukharov 43'; Rosina 67'; Denisov 88'	Stadium: Olympic Stadium; Attendance: 13,605; Referee: Said Ennjimi (France)

== Statistics ==
=== Squad statistics ===
As of 25 May 2011

No.	Pos	Player	Super League		Super League Play-offs		Greek Cup		Europa League		Total	
No.	Pos	Player	Apps	Goals	Apps	Goals	Apps	Goals	Apps	Goals	Apps	Goals
Goalkeepers
22	GK	(Greece) Giannis Arabatzis	9	0	0	0	1	0	2	0	12	0
23	GK	(Argentina) Sebastián Saja	21	0	6	0	6	0	6	0	39	0
27	GK	(Serbia) Milan Lukač	0	0	0	0	0	0	0	0	0	0
28	GK	(Greece) Theodoros Moschonas	0	0	0	0	0	0	0	0	0	0
Defenders
3	DF	(Argentina) Cristian Nasuti	18	0	0	0	3	0	2	0	23	0
4	DF	(Greece) Kostas Manolas	22	1	5	0	3	1	6	1	36	3
5	DF	(Greece) Traianos Dellas	19	2	5	1	6	1	6	0	36	4
6	DF	(Spain) David Mateos	7	0	3	0	2	0	0	0	12	0
8	DF	(Bosnia and Herzegovina) Sanel Jahić	17	0	0	0	2	0	6	0	25	0
13	DF	(Uruguay) Claudio Dadómo	5	0	1	0	2	0	1	0	9	0
15	DF	(Greece) Nikolaos Karabelas	17	0	5	0	7	1	3	0	32	1
17	DF	(Greece) Anestis Argyriou	5	0	0	0	2	0	1	0	8	0
26	DF	(Croatia) Dino Drpić	1	0	1	0	0	0	0	0	2	0
31	DF	(Greece) Nikolaos Georgeas	7	1	5	0	4	1	1	0	17	2
92	DF	(Greece) Michalis Tsamourlidis	0	0	0	0	0	0	0	0	0	0
Midfielders
1	MF	(Greece) Pantelis Kafes	20	3	4	0	4	1	7	1	35	5
7	MF	(Poland) Roger Guerreiro	19	1	5	0	3	0	0	0	27	1
11	MF	(Spain) Míchel	10	0	5	0	3	1	0	0	18	1
14	MF	(Greece) Grigoris Makos	22	0	5	0	7	0	7	0	41	0
19	MF	(Greece) Panagiotis Lagos	21	2	6	0	5	1	7	0	39	3
21	MF	(Senegal) Papa Bouba Diop	19	1	5	2	6	0	7	1	37	4
25	MF	(Greece) Lefteris Intzoglou	0	0	0	0	0	0	0	0	0	0
90	MF	(Greece) Savvas Gentsoglou	15	0	1	0	1	0	6	0	23	0
Forwards
9	FW	(Brazil) Leonardo	22	3	4	2	2	1	7	0	35	6
18	FW	(Argentina) Ismael Blanco	22	9	3	0	7	4	7	2	39	15
20	FW	(Brazil) Éder	10	1	2	0	1	0	3	0	16	1
24	FW	(Australia) Nathan Burns	17	1	1	0	2	0	5	0	25	1
29	FW	(Greece) Giorgios Nikoltsis	1	0	0	0	0	0	0	0	1	0
32	FW	(Argentina) Ignacio Scocco	23	9	4	1	6	0	7	2	40	12
33	FW	(Greece) Nikos Liberopoulos	22	7	1	0	6	3	5	2	34	12
39	FW	(Morocco) Nabil Baha	9	0	6	0	3	1	0	0	18	1
77	FW	(Belgium) Viktor Klonaridis	0	0	1	0	0	0	0	0	1	0
93	FW	(Cyprus) Dimitris Froxylias	0	0	0	0	0	0	1	0	1	0
99	FW	(Albania) Serxhio Abdurahmani	1	0	0	0	0	0	0	0	1	0
Left during Winter Transfer Window
2	DF	(Greece) Christos Patsatzoglou	7	0	0	0	0	0	3	0	10	0
35	DF	(Greece) Stamatis Kalamiotis	0	0	0	0	1	0	0	0	1	0
88	DF	(Argentina) Carlos Araujo	0	0	0	0	0	0	0	0	0	0
10	FW	(Algeria) Rafik Djebbour	11	5	0	0	2	1	6	2	19	8

=== Goalscorers ===
As of 25 May 2011
The list is sorted by competition order when total goals are equal, then by position and then by squad number.

Rank	No.	Pos.	Player	Super League	Super League Play-offs	Greek Cup	Europa League	Total
1	18	FW	(Argentina) Ismael Blanco	9	0	4	2	15
2	32	FW	(Argentina) Ignacio Scocco	9	1	0	2	12
2	33	FW	(Greece) Nikos Liberopoulos	7	0	3	2	12
4	10	FW	(Algeria) Rafik Djebbour	5	0	1	2	8
5	9	FW	(Brazil) Leonardo	3	2	1	0	6
6	1	MF	(Greece) Pantelis Kafes	3	0	1	1	5
7	5	DF	(Greece) Traianos Dellas	2	1	1	0	4
7	21	MF	(Senegal) Papa Bouba Diop	1	2	0	1	4
9	19	MF	(Greece) Panagiotis Lagos	2	0	0	1	3
9	4	DF	(Greece) Kostas Manolas	1	0	1	1	3
11	31	DF	(Greece) Nikolaos Georgeas	1	0	1	0	2
12	7	MF	(Poland) Roger Guerreiro	1	0	0	0	1
12	24	FW	(Australia) Nathan Burns	1	0	0	0	1
12	20	FW	(Brazil) Éder	1	0	0	0	1
12	15	DF	(Greece) Nikolaos Karabelas	0	0	1	0	1
12	11	MF	(Spain) Míchel	0	0	1	0	1
12	39	FW	(Morocco) Nabil Baha	0	0	1	0	1
Own goals				0	0	0	0	0
Totals				46	6	18	11	81

=== Hat-tricks ===
Numbers in superscript represent the goals that the player scored.

Player	Against	Result	Date	Competition	Source
(Argentina) Ismael Blanco	(Greece) Panthrakikos	5–1 (H)	28 October 2010	Greek Cup	

=== Assists ===
As of 25 May 2011
The list is sorted by competition order when total assists are equal, then by position and then by squad number.

Rank	No.	Pos.	Player	Super League	Super League Play-offs	Greek Cup	Europa League	Total
1	32	FW	(Argentina) Ignacio Scocco	2	1	2	5	10
2	7	MF	(Poland) Roger Guerreiro	5	0	2	0	7
3	19	MF	(Greece) Panagiotis Lagos	4	0	1	0	5
4	33	FW	(Greece) Nikos Liberopoulos	2	0	2	0	4
5	18	FW	(Argentina) Ismael Blanco	2	0	1	0	3
5	10	FW	(Algeria) Rafik Djebbour	1	0	1	1	3
5	9	FW	(Brazil) Leonardo	0	0	1	2	3
8	31	DF	(Greece) Nikolaos Georgeas	2	0	0	0	2
8	15	DF	(Greece) Nikolaos Karabelas	1	1	0	0	2
8	1	MF	(Greece) Pantelis Kafes	1	0	1	0	2
8	21	MF	(Senegal) Papa Bouba Diop	1	0	0	1	2
8	12	DF	(Bosnia and Herzegovina) Sanel Jahić	0	0	1	1	2
13	23	GK	(Argentina) Sebastián Saja	1	0	0	0	1
13	4	DF	(Greece) Kostas Manolas	1	0	0	0	1
13	90	MF	(Greece) Savvas Gentsoglou	1	0	0	0	1
13	11	MF	(Spain) Míchel	1	0	0	0	1
13	20	FW	(Brazil) Éder	1	0	0	0	1
13	5	DF	(Greece) Traianos Dellas	0	1	0	0	1
Totals				26	3	12	10	51

=== Clean sheets ===
As of 25 May 2011
The list is sorted by competition order when total clean sheets are equal and then by squad number. Clean sheets in games where both goalkeepers participated are awarded to the goalkeeper who started the game. Goalkeepers with no appearances are not included.

Rank	No.	Player	Super League	Super League Play-offs	Greek Cup	Europa League	Total
1	23	(Argentina) Sebastián Saja	8	2	5	1	16
2	22	(Greece) Giannis Arabatzis	5	0	0	0	5
Totals			13	2	5	1	21

=== Disciplinary record ===
As of 25 May 2011

N	P	Nat.	Name	Super League			Super League Play-offs			Greek Cup			Europa League			Total			Notes
N	P	Nat.	Name	Yellow card	Second yellow card	Red card	Yellow card	Second yellow card	Red card	Yellow card	Second yellow card	Red card	Yellow card	Second yellow card	Red card	Yellow card	Second yellow card	Red card	Notes
Goalkeepers
22	GK	(Greece)	Giannis Arabatzis	2												2			
23	GK	(Argentina)	Sebastián Saja	2			1						1			4			
27	GK	(Serbia)	Milan Lukač																
28	GK	(Greece)	Theodoros Moschonas																
Defenders
3	DF	(Argentina)	Cristian Nasuti	6											1	6		1	
4	DF	(Greece)	Kostas Manolas	9	1	1							1			10	1	1	
5	DF	(Greece)	Traianos Dellas	4		1	2						1			7		1	
6	DF	(Spain)	David Mateos	2	1											2	1		
8	DF	(Bosnia and Herzegovina)	Sanel Jahić	2						2			1			5			
13	DF	(Uruguay)	Claudio Dadómo	1		1										1		1	
15	DF	(Greece)	Nikolaos Karabelas	7			1			2						10			
17	DF	(Greece)	Anestis Argyriou	2									1			3			
26	DF	(Croatia)	Dino Drpić																
31	DF	(Greece)	Nikolaos Georgeas	4			1									5			
92	DF	(Greece)	Michalis Tsamourlidis																
Midfielders
1	MF	(Greece)	Pantelis Kafes	7												7			
7	MF	(Poland)	Roger Guerreiro	1						2						3			
11	MF	(Spain)	Míchel	3			2			1						6			
14	MF	(Greece)	Grigoris Makos	7			2	1		4			5			18	1		
19	MF	(Greece)	Panagiotis Lagos	5						1			2			8			
21	MF	(Senegal)	Papa Bouba Diop	6	1		1			2			1			10	1		
25	MF	(Greece)	Lefteris Intzoglou																
90	MF	(Greece)	Savvas Gentsoglou	2									2			4			
Forwards
9	FW	(Brazil)	Leonardo	2			1						1			4			
18	MF	(Argentina)	Ismael Blanco	4			1									5			
20	FW	(Brazil)	Éder	2												2			
24	FW	(Australia)	Nathan Burns	3												3			
29	FW	(Greece)	Giorgios Nikoltsis																
32	FW	(Argentina)	Ignacio Scocco	5			1			2			1			9			
33	FW	(Greece)	Nikos Liberopoulos	4						3			1			8			
39	FW	(Morocco)	Nabil Baha																
77	FW	(Belgium)	Viktor Klonaridis																
93	FW	(Cyprus)	Dimitris Froxylias																
99	FW	(Albania)	Serxhio Abdurahmani																
Left during Winter Transfer window
2	DF	(Greece)	Christos Patsatzoglou										1			1			
35	DF	(Greece)	Stamatis Kalamiotis							1						1			
88	DF	(Argentina)	Carlos Araujo																
10	FW	(Algeria)	Rafik Djebbour	2												2			

=== Starting 11 ===
This section presents the most frequently used formation along with the players with the most starts across all competitions.

N.	Formation	Matchday(s)
25	4–4–2 (D)	8, 13, 15, 17–22, 24–30
10	4–2–3–1	1, 7, 11, 12, 14, 16
10	4–3–3	6, 8–10
4	4–4–2	2, 4, 5
2	4–2–1–3	23

No.	Nat.	Player	Pos.
23	(Argentina)	Sebastián Saja	GK
4	(Greece)	Kostas Manolas	RCB
5	(Greece)	Traianos Dellas	LCB
14	(Greece)	Grigoris Makos	RB
15	(Greece)	Nikolaos Karabelas	LB
21	(Senegal)	Papa Bouba Diop	DM
1	(Greece)	Pantelis Kafes (C)	RCM
19	(Greece)	Panagiotis Lagos	LCM
11	(Spain)	Míchel	AM
32	(Argentina)	Ignacio Scocco	SS
33	(Greece)	Nikos Liberopoulos	CF

Last updated: 2011-05-25

=== UEFA rankings ===
UEFA team ranking

Rank 10-11	Mvmt	Rank 09-10	Team	Coeff.
61	+23	84	(Netherlands) Twente	28.192
62	+8	70	(England) Blackburn Rovers	26.957
63	+14	77	(Greece) AEK Athens	26.313
64	+18	82	(Ukraine) Metalist Kharkiv	26.193
65	−13	52	(England) Bolton Wanderers	25.957

UEFA country ranking

Rank 10-11	Mvmt	Rank 09-10	League	Coeff.
9	+2	11	(Turkey) Turkcell Süper Lig	32.650
10	—	10	(Netherlands) Eredivisie	30.963
11	+1	12	Super League Greece	29.066
12	+3	15	(Denmark) SAS Ligaen	26.150
13	−5	8	(Romania) Liga I Gamebookers.com	24.408

Last updated: 2010-05-20
Source: xs4all.nl

== Awards ==
Player	Pos.	Award	Source
(Greece) Nikos Liberopoulos	FW	Best Goal Award (2nd Matchday)	
(Argentina) Ignacio Scocco	FW	Best Goal Award (3rd Matchday)	
(Brazil) Leonardo	FW	Best Goal Award (5th Matchday)	
(Argentina) Ignacio Scocco	FW	MVP Award (6th Matchday)	
(Argentina) Ignacio Scocco	FW	Best Goal Award (6th Matchday)	
(Brazil) Leonardo	FW	MVP Award (20th Matchday)	
(Greece) Nikos Liberopoulos	FW	Best Goal Award (20th Matchday)	
(Argentina) Ignacio Scocco	FW	MVP Award (25th Matchday)	
(Argentina) Ismael Blanco	FW	Greek Cup Top Scorer (shared)	
