= Serxhio =

Serxhio is an Albanian given name. Notable people with the name include:

- Serxhio Abdurahmani (born 1992), Albanian footballer
- Serxhio Gjonbrati (born 1993), Albanian footballer
- Serxhio Mukja (born 1996), Albanian footballer
