= 2011 Greek Football Cup final =

2011 Greek Cup final
- Event: 2010–11 Greek Football Cup
Atromitos	AEK Athens
0	3
- Date: 30 April 2011
- Venue: Olympic Stadium, Marousi, Athens
- Man of the Match: Nikos Liberopoulos (AEK Athens)
- Referee: Anastasios Kakos (Corfu)
- Attendance: 50,912
- Weather: Mostly Cloudy; 17 °C (63 °F); 68% humidity

The 2011 Greek Cup final was the 67th final of the Greek Cup. The match took place on 30 April 2011 at the Olympic Stadium. The contesting teams were Atromitos and AEK Athens. It was Atromitos' first-ever Greek Cup final in their 88 years of existence and AEK Athens' twentieth Greek Cup final in their 87-year history. The match that was tarnished by serious incidents caused by AEK Athens' fans afterwards.

== Venue ==
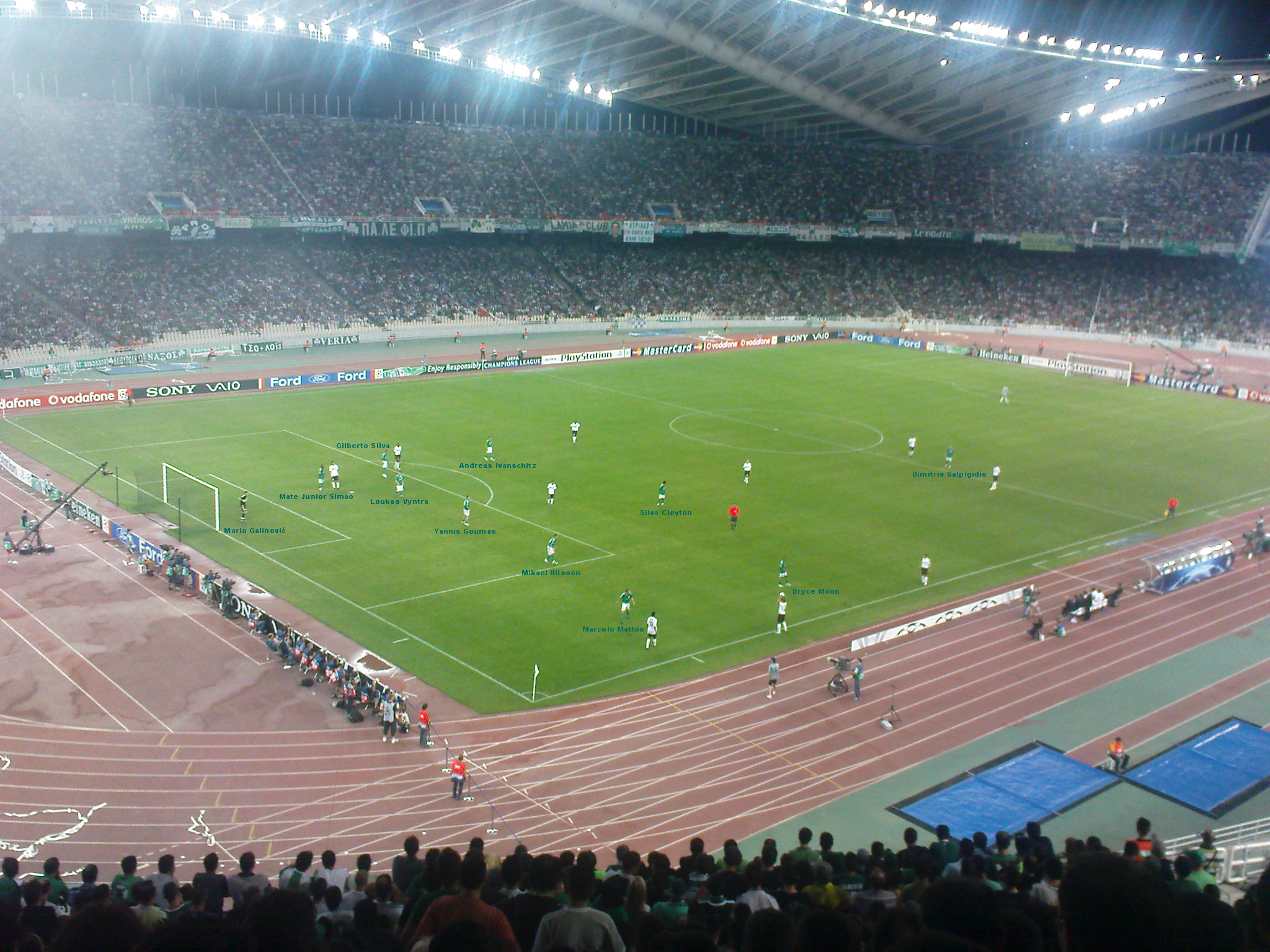
Athens Olympic Stadium.

This was the eighteenth Greek Cup final held at the Athens Olympic Stadium.

The Athens Olympic Stadium was built in 1982 and renovated once in 2004. The stadium is used as a venue for AEK Athens and Panathinaikos and was used for Olympiacos and Greece on various occasions. Its current capacity is 69,618 and it hosted three European Cup/UEFA Champions League finals in 1983, 1994 and 2007, a UEFA Cup Winners' Cup final in 1987, the 1991 Mediterranean Games and the 2004 Summer Olympics.

== Background ==
Atromitos had never before competed in a Cup final.

AEK Athens had reached the Greek Cup final nineteen times, winning twelve of them. The last time that they had won the Cup was in 2002 (2–1 against Olympiacos). The last time that they had played in a final was in 2009, where they had lost to Olympiacos by 15–14 on a penalty shootout, which came after a 4–4 draw at the end of the extra time.

The two teams had never met each other in a Cup final.

== Route to the final ==
Atromitos				Round	AEK Athens			
Opponent	Agg.	1st leg	2nd leg		Opponent	Agg.	1st leg	2nd leg
Anagennisi Giannitsa	3–1 (A)			Round of 32	Panthrakikos	5–1 (A)		
Kavala	1–0 (H)			Round of 16	AEL	4–0 (A)		
Diagoras	3–0	2–0 (H)	1–0 (A)	Quarter-finals	Panathinaikos	4–3	2–0 (A)	2–3 (H)
Olympiacos Volos	2–1	2–1 (H)	0–0 (A)	Semi-finals	PAOK	1–0	0–0 (H)	1–0 (A)

== Match ==
=== Details ===
30 April 2011
20:30 EEST

Atromitos	0–3	AEK Athens
	Report	Liberopoulos 28'; Baha 78'; Kafes 85'

Olympic Stadium, Marousi
Attendance: 50,912
Referee: Anastasios Kakos (Corfu)

Atromitos	AEK Athens

GK	1	(Cameroon) Charles Itandje
RB	32	(Greece) Giannis Skondras	(yellow card) 25'
CB	4	(Poland) Marcin Baszczyński
CB	26	(Brazil) Marcelo Oliveira		(substituted off) 83'
LB	2	(Greece) Vangelis Nastos
DM	6	(Greece) Konstantinos Nebegleras (c)	(yellow card) 43'
CM	19	(Greece) Stelios Sfakianakis
CM	22	(Greece) Andreas Tatos
RW	7	(Senegal) Henri Camara		(substituted off) 89'
LW	20	(Poland) Marek Saganowski		(substituted off) 66'
CF	8	(Greece) Ilias Anastasakos
Substitutes:
GK	23	(Greece) Chrysostomos Michailidis
DF	5	(Senegal) Massamba Sambou		(substituted on) 89'
DF	31	(Greece) Filippos Darlas
MF	11	(Brazil) Luiz Brito		(substituted on) 66'
MF	17	(Argentina) Marcelo Sarmiento		(substituted on) 83'
FW	21	(Greece) Thanasis Karagounis
FW	40	(Greece) Giannis Karalis
Manager:
(Greece) Georgios Donis

GK	23	(Argentina) Sebastián Saja
RB	31	(Greece) Nikolaos Georgeas
CB	5	(Greece) Traianos Dellas
CB	4	(Greece) Kostas Manolas
LB	15	(Greece) Nikolaos Karabelas
DM	21	(Senegal) Papa Bouba Diop	(yellow card) 63'
CM	14	(Greece) Grigoris Makos	(yellow card) 25'
CM	19	(Greece) Panagiotis Lagos
AM	33	(Greece) Nikos Liberopoulos (c)	(yellow card) 29'
SS	32	(Argentina) Ignacio Scocco		(substituted off) 33'
CF	18	(Argentina) Ismael Blanco		(substituted off) 70'
Substitutes:
GK	22	(Greece) Giannis Arabatzis
DF	6	(Spain) David Mateos
MF	1	(Greece) Pantelis Kafes	(yellow card) 89'	(substituted on) 70'
MF	11	(Spain) Míchel
MF	90	(Greece) Savvas Gentsoglou
FW	9	(Brazil) Leonardo
FW	39	(Morocco) Nabil Baha		(substituted on) 33'
Manager:
(Spain) Manolo Jiménez

Man of the Match:
(Greece) Nikos Liberopoulos (AEK Athens)

Assistant referees:
Christos Baltas (Achaea)
Petros Tryfon (Drama)
Fourth official:
Anastasios Sidiropoulos (Dodecanese)
Match Observer:
Giannis Tsachilidis

Match rules

- 90 minutes
- 30 minutes of extra time if necessary
- Penalty shootout if scores still level
- Seven named substitutes
- Maximum of three substitutions

== See also ==
- 2010–11 Greek Football Cup
