= Spyros Matentzidis =

Greek footballer

Personal information
- Full name: Spyridon Matentzidis
- Date of birth: 23 July 1990 (age 36)
- Place of birth: Kilkis, Greece
- Height: 1.82 m (6 ft 0 in)
- Position: Center-back

Team information
- Current team: Doxa Chersou

Youth career
- –2009: Panthrakikos

Senior career*
Years	Team	Apps	(Gls)
2009–2010	Panthrakikos	13	(0)
2010–2013	AEK Athens	0	(0)
2010–2011	→ Anagennisi Karditsa (loan)	3	(0)
2011–2012	→ Diagoras (loan)	10	(0)
2012–2013	→ Korinthos (loan)	8	(0)
2013–2015	Kilkisiakos		
2015–2016	Vyzantio Kokkinochoma		
2016–2019	Kilkisiakos		
2019–2023	PAOK Kristonis		
2023–2024	Doxa Chersou		
- * Club domestic league appearances and goals as of April 2026

Spyros Matentzidis (Greek: Σπύρος Ματεντζίδης; born on 23 July 1990) is a Greek former footballer who used to play as center-back.

== Club career ==
Matentzidis took his first steps in football at the local academies of Kilkis, later moving to the youth teams of Panthrakikos. His good performance in the U21 team led his coach to promote him to the men's team in the winter of 2010, where he managed to make 13 appearances in the Super League Greece. There, the manager of AEK Athens, Dušan Bajević located him and indicated the acquisition of both him and his teammate, Anestis Argyriou. The yellow-blacks paid a high price to Panthrakikos, while the 20-year-old Matentzidis signed a four-year contract with AEK. Even though he joined the club's summer pre-season at Seefeld, he did not manage to convince Bajević and was loaned to Anagennisi Karditsa. In two following seasons he was again loaned to Diagoras and Korinthos. In the summer of 2013 he was released and signed a contract with Kilkisiakos.
