= Éder Lima (footballer, born 1987) =

Brazilian footballer

Personal information
- Full name: Éder Luiz Lima de Souza
- Date of birth: 9 January 1987 (age 39)
- Place of birth: Campinas, Brazil
- Height: 1.79 m (5 ft 10 in)
- Position: Forward

Team information
- Current team: Rio Claro

Youth career
- Guarani

Senior career*
Years	Team	Apps	(Gls)
2006–2007	Guarani	2	(0)
2007–2013	Tombense	0	(0)
2008	→ Flamengo (loan)	4	(0)
2008	→ Paraná (loan)	18	(4)
2009	→ Vila Nova (loan)	54	(9)
2009–2010	→ Asteras Tripolis (loan)	26	(5)
2010–2011	→ AEK Athens (loan)	12	(1)
2011	→ Criciúma (loan)	6	(0)
2011–2012	→ Nacional-MG (loan)	0	(0)
2013	→ Boa EC (loan)	3	(1)
2014	Al Shabab	3	(0)
2015–2016	Daegu FC	76	(16)
2017	Jeonbuk Hyundai Motors	24	(3)
2018–2019	Seongnam FC	49	(12)
2020	Jeju United	4	(1)
2020–2021	Jiangxi Liansheng	26	(7)
2022	Chongqing Liangjiang Athletic	0	(0)
2022	Tianjin Jinmen Tiger	10	(1)
2023–2024	Boavista SC	4	(0)
2025–	Rio Claro		
Total		321	(60)
- * Club domestic league appearances and goals as of 6 August 2022 (UTC)

Éder Luiz Lima de Souza (born 9 January 1987), sometimes known as just Éder, is a Brazilian footballer who plays as a forward for Rio Claro.

== Career ==
Éder started his career for his local football club Guarani where he stayed for two seasons before joining lower league side Tombense. He was immediately loaned to top-tier club Flamengo before going to Paraná and then Vila Nova.

He moved to top tier Greek side Asteras Tripolis for the 2009–10 Super League Greece season on loan.

On 27 June 2010, Éder was loaned on AEK Athens. He signed a 1+1 year deal. He made his debut in the UEFA Europa League play-offs in a 1–0 win against Dundee United on 19 August 2010. He scored his first goal in a 3–1 home league win against Ergotelis.

On 9 July 2011, he returned to Brazil and was loaned to Campeonato Série B side Criciúma along with Adeílson and Dorival.

== Career statistics ==
As of match played 31 December 2021

Appearances and goals by club, season and competition
Club	Season	League			National cup		Continental		Other		Total	
Club	Season	Division	Apps	Goals	Apps	Goals	Apps	Goals	Apps	Goals	Apps	Goals
Guarani	2006	Série B	0	0	0	0	–		29 (Note: Appearances in Campeonato Paulista)	6	29	6
Guarani	2007	Série C	2	0	0	0	–		0	0	2	0
Guarani	Total		2	0	0	0	0	0	0	0	31	6
Flamengo (loan)	2008	Série A	5	0	0	0	–		–		5	0
Paraná (loan)	2008	Série B	18	4	0	0	–		–		18	4
Vila Nova (loan)	2009	Série B					–		–			
Asteras Tripolis (loan)	2009–10	Super League Greece	26	5	1	0	–		–		27	5
AEK Athens (loan)	2010–11	Super League Greece	12	1	1	0	3	0	–		16	1
Criciúma (loan)	2011	Série B	6	0	0	0	–		–		6	0
Nacional-MG (loan)	2012		–		–		–		–		0	0
Boa EC (loan)	2013	Série B	3	1	0	0	–		–		3	1
Al Shabab	2013–14	UAE Pro League	3	0	0	0	–		–		3	0
Daegu FC	2015	K League 2	39	10	2	0	–		–		41	10
Daegu FC	2016	K League 2	37	6	1	0	–		–		38	6
Daegu FC	Total		76	16	3	0	0	0	0	0	79	16
Jeonbuk Hyundai Motors	2017	K League 1	24	3	1	0	–		–		25	3
Seongnam FC	2018	K League 2	28	7	2	0	–		–		30	7
Seongnam FC	2019	K League 1	21	5	0	0	–		–		21	5
Seongnam FC	Total		49	12	2	0	0	0	0	0	51	12
Jeju United	2020	K League 2	4	1	1	0	–		–		5	1
Jiangxi Liansheng	2020	China League One	7	1	–		–		2 (Note: Appearances in China League One relegation play-offs)	3	9	4
Jiangxi Liansheng	2021	China League One	17	3	0	0	–		–		17	3
Jiangxi Liansheng	Total		24	4	0	0	0	0	2	3	26	7
Career total												

== Honours ==
Flamengo

- Taça Guanabara: 2008
- Rio State League: 2008

Jeonbuk Hyundai Motors

- K League 1: 2017
