= Anestis Argyriou =

Greek footballer (born 1988)

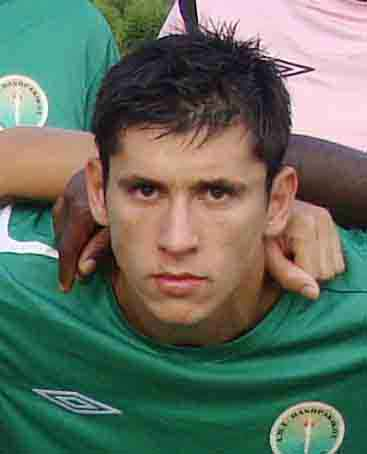
- Argyriou in 2009

Personal information
- Full name: Anestis Argyriou
- Date of birth: 4 January 1988 (age 38)
- Place of birth: Chariessa, Imathia, Greece
- Height: 1.83 m (6 ft 0 in)
- Position: Right-back

Team information
- Current team: Veria (manager)

Youth career
- –2007: Veria

Senior career*
Years	Team	Apps	(Gls)
2006–2007	→ Aetos Skydras (loan)		
2007–2010	Panthrakikos	38	(0)
2010–2012	AEK Athens	13	(0)
2012–2013	Rangers	20	(0)
2014	Zawisza Bydgoszcz	8	(0)
2015–2016	Ethnikos Achna	10	(0)
2016–2017	Agrotikos Asteras	29	(0)
2018	Naoussa		
2018–2019	Almopos Aridea		
2021	Iraklis	8	(1)

International career
2008–2010	Greece U21	7	(0)

Managerial career
- 2026: Veria (assistant)
- 2026–: Veria
- * Club domestic league appearances and goals

Anestis Argyriou (Greek: Ανέστης Αργυρίου; born 4 January 1988) is a Greek former professional footballer who played as a right-back.

== Club career ==
=== Aetos Skydra ===
Argyriou began his career with Aetos Skydra (was on loan from Veria F.C.) in Delta Ethniki. In Skydra he performed admirably and was tipped as a hot prospect.

=== Panthrakikos ===
After many good performances in 2007 Argyriou signed for Super League team Panthrakikos being deployed as a right fullback or central defender. In April 2010 he had a successful week's trial in Blackburn.

=== AEK Athens ===
On 11 May 2010 Argyriou agreed to sign for AEK Athens along with a teammate at his previous club Panthrakikos, Spyros Matentzidis. He scored his first goal in a friendly match against Hapoel Be'er Sheva F.C. in a 1–0 victory for AEK Athens. He made his first appearance in the Greek Super League against Panathinaikos. In July 2012 Argyriou's contract was terminated by AEK to pay off club debts.

=== Rangers ===
On 12 August 2012, Argyriou joined Rangers on trial and later signed a two-year contract with the club on 25 August 2012. He made his debut in a 1–1 draw against Berwick Rangers on 26 August. On 18 September 2013 Rangers announced that defender Anestis Argyriou had mutually agreed to terminate his contract.

=== Zawisza Bydgoszcz ===
On 22 July 2014, Argyriou joined Polish side Zawisza Bydgoszcz on five-day-long trial. On 31 July he signed a two-year contract with the club. Argyriou made his Ekstraklasa debut on 10 August in home match against Podbeskidzie Bielsko-Biała (1–2).

== International career ==
Argyriou, during 2008–10 period participated for the Greece U-21 team in seven games:

== Career statistics ==
As of 6 October 2014

Club	Season	League		Cup		League Cup		Other (Note: Includes other competitive competitions, including the Scottish Challenge Cup and the UEFA Europa League.)		Total	
Club	Season	Apps	Goals	Apps	Goals	Apps	Goals	Apps	Goals	Apps	Goals
Panthrakikos	2008–09	13	0	2	0	—	—	—	—	15	0
Panthrakikos	2009–10	25	0	1	0	—	—	—	—	26	0
Panthrakikos	Total	38	0	3	0	—	—	—	—	41	0
AEK Athens	2010–11	5	0	2	0	0	0	1	0	8	0
AEK Athens	2011–12	8	0	1	0	0	0	0	0	9	0
AEK Athens	Total	13	0	3	0	0	0	1	0	17	0
Rangers	2012–13	20	0	3	0	3	0	1	0	27	0
Rangers	Total	20	0	3	0	3	0	1	0	27	0
Zawisza	2014–15	8	0	1	0	0	0	0	0	9	0
Zawisza	Total	8	0	1	0	0	0	0	0	9	0
Career total		79	0	10	0	3	0	2	0	94	0

== Honours ==
AEK

- Greek Cup: 2010–11

Rangers

- Scottish Third Division: 2012–13
