= Claudio Dadómo =

Uruguayan footballer (born 1982)

Personal information
- Full name: Claudio Martín Dadómo Minervini
- Date of birth: February 10, 1982 (age 44)
- Place of birth: Montevideo, Uruguay
- Height: 1.76 m (5 ft 9 in)
- Position: Left back

Senior career*
Years	Team	Apps	(Gls)
2000–2007	Montevideo Wanderers	120	(15)
2003	→ Nacional (loan)	16	(1)
2008	Hammarby IF	8	(1)
2008–2010	Cerro	44	(8)
2010–2011	AEK Athens	6	(0)
2011	Ergotelis	1	(0)
2012–2013	River Plate	14	(1)
2013–2014	Cerro	30	(2)
2015–2016	El Tanque Sisley	11	(0)

International career
2001–2003	Uruguay	3	(0)
Medal record
Gold medal – first place	Uruguayan Segunda División	2000\
Gold medal – first place	Uruguayan Primera División	2003 Apertura\
- * Club domestic league appearances and goals as of 13:55, 28 April 2013 (UTC)

Claudio Martín Dadómo Minervini (born 10 February 1982) is an Uruguayan international footballer last playing as a left wingback for El Tanque Sisley in the Uruguayan Primera División.

Dadómo also holds an Italian passport.

== Club career ==
=== Beginnings ===
Dadómo was born in Montevideo, and started his career there, playing for Montevideo Wanderers and Nacional.

=== Hammarby ===
In January 2008, Dadómo joined the Swedish club Hammarby IF where he played 8 matches in the Allsvenskan and scored 1 goal against Gefle IF, but soon after left the team in May 2008

=== Cerro ===
During 2008–2010 Dadómo played for Cerro, one of the most important teams in Uruguay. Was one of the most valuable player for the team. He scored 3 of the 5 goals with his team in Copa Libertadores. Cerro was the surprise of the Copa Libertadores and Dadómo was involved.

=== AEK Athens ===
On July 5, 2010 Dadomo joined AEK. He signed a two-year contract with the team from Athens and the second player from Uruguay to play for the club after Milton Viera. He made his debut playing on an UEFA Championship on the 4 November 2010 against R.S.C. Anderlecht, where he played the whole match, which they finally drew.

=== Ergotelis ===
In August 2011, he was transferred to Ergotelis. He made his debut on 22 October 2011 against Panathinaikos.

== Statistics ==
=== Club ===
Club	Season	League	Domestic League		Domestic Cups		Continental Cups		Total	
Club	Season	League	Apps	Goals	Apps	Goals	Apps	Goals	Apps	Goals
Hammarby	2008	Allsvenskan	8	1	0	0	–	–	8	1
Cerro	2008–2009	Primera División Uruguaya	31	7	–	–	–	–	31	7
Cerro	2009–2010	Primera División Uruguaya	17	2	–	–	6	3	23	5
AEK Athens	2010–2011	Super League Greece	6	0	2	0	1	0	9	0
Ergotelis	2011–2012	Super League Greece	1	0	0	0	–	–	1	0
River Plate	2011–2012	Primera División Uruguaya	6	0	–	–	–	–	6	0
River Plate	2012–2013	Primera División Uruguaya	8	1	–	–	–	–	8	1
Cerro	2012–2013	Primera División Uruguaya	0	0	–	–	–	–	0	0
Total	Career		77	11	2	0	7	3	86	14

=== International ===
Uruguay national team
Year	Apps	Goals
2001	2	0
2003	1	0
Total	3	0

Last updated: 2010-3-03
Source: Claudio Dadómo at National-Football-Teams.com

== Honours ==
Montevideo Wanderers

- Uruguayan Segunda División: 2000

AEK Athens

- Greek Cup: 2010-11
