= Doriva (footballer, born 1987) =

Brazilian footballer

Personal information
- Full name: Dorival das Neves Ferraz Júnior
- Date of birth: 13 April 1987 (age 39)
- Place of birth: Sorocaba, (SP), Brazil
- Height: 1.82 m (6 ft 0 in)
- Position: Defensive midfielder

Team information
- Current team: A.E. Kifisia
- Number: 8

Youth career
- 2005–2007: Tombense
- 2006: → Guarani (loan)
- 2007: → Bangu (loan)

Senior career*
Years	Team	Apps	(Gls)
2007–2018	Tombense	24	(6)
2007	→ Bangu (loan)	3	(0)
2008	→ Madureira (loan)	0	(0)
2008–2009	→ Skoda Xanthi (loan)	18	(0)
2010	→ Thrasyvoulos (loan)	23	(2)
2011	→ Anagennisi Karditsa (loan)	28	(5)
2011	→ Criciúma (loan)	14	(3)
2012	→ Figueirense (loan)	36	(0)
2013–2014	→ América Mineiro (loan)	35	(3)
2015	→ Matsumoto Yamaga (loan)	5	(0)
2017	→ Grêmio Novorizontino (loan)	11	(0)
2017–2018	→ Red Bull Brasil (loan)	0	(0)
2018–2020	São Bento	33	(4)
2020–2021	Diagoras	21	(2)
2021–	A.E. Kifisia	29	(5)
- * Club domestic league appearances and goals as of 20:14, 5 June 2022 (UTC)

Dorival das Neves Ferraz Júnior, known as Doriva (born 13 April 1987), is a Brazilian professional footballer who plays as a defensive midfielder for Greek Super League 2 club A.E. Kifisia.
