= Serxhio Mukja =

Albanian footballer

Personal information
- Date of birth: 15 November 1996 (age 29)
- Place of birth: Elbasan, Albania
- Position: Midfielder

Youth career
- 2011–2015: Elbasani

Senior career*
Years	Team	Apps	(Gls)
2013–2015	Elbasani	4	(0)
2016–2017	Besa Kavajë	12	(0)
2017	Teuta Durrës		

International career
2012	Albania U17	3	(0)
2014	Albania U19	1	(0)
- * Club domestic league appearances and goals

Serxhio Mukja (born 15 November 1996) is an Albanian former professional footballer who played as a midfielder.

== International career ==
=== Albania U17 ===
Mukja received his first Albania under-17 call-up by manager Džemal Mustedanagić for a friendly tournament developed in August 2012 in Romania.

== Career statistics ==
=== Club ===
As of 14 May 2016

Club statistics
Club	Season	League			Cup		Total	
Club	Season	Division	Apps	Goals	Apps	Goals	Apps	Goals
Elbasani	2012–13	Albanian First Division	1	0	—		1	0
Elbasani	2013–14	Albanian First Division	1	0	1	0	2	0
Elbasani	2014–15	Albanian Superliga	2	0	—		2	0
Elbasani	Total		4	0	1	0	5	0
Besa Kavajë	2015–16	Albanian First Division	12	0	—		12	0
Career total			16	0	1	0	17	0
