= Vicente Monje =

Argentine footballer

Personal information
- Full name: Vicente Alfredo Monje
- Date of birth: 22 June 1981 (age 45)
- Place of birth: Yuto, Argentina
- Height: 1.74 m (5 ft 8 1/2 in)
- Positions: Left winger; striker

Senior career*
Years	Team	Apps	(Gls)
2002–2004	Gimnasia y Tiro	9	(2)
2004–2005	Club Atlético Atlanta	45	(13)
2006	Ferro Carril Oeste	12	(15)
2007	Beerschot AC	3	(0)
2007	Ferro Carril Oeste	23	(16)
2009–2011	Olympiacos Volos	49	(5)
2011–2012	Olympiacos	9	(0)
2012–2013	Orduspor	16	(0)
2013–2014	AEK Larnaca	1	(0)
2014	Olympiacos Volos	13	(0)
2014–2015	Gimnasia y Tiro	12	(0)
2015–2016	Central Norte	37	(7)
- * Club domestic league appearances and goals as of 4 May 2015

Vicente Alfredo Monje (born 22 June 1981) is an Argentine former footballer who last played for Central Norte. He previously played for clubs including Olympiacos, Ferro Carril Oeste and Orduspor.

== Honours ==
Olympiacos

- Super League Greece: 2011–12
- Greek Football Cup: 2012
