= Georgios Nikoltsis =

Greek footballer

Personal information
- Full name: Georgios Nikoltsis
- Date of birth: 6 April 1992 (age 34)
- Place of birth: Naousa, Greece
- Height: 1.86 m (6 ft 1 in)
- Position: Striker

Team information
- Current team: Aris Soudas

Youth career
- –2010: AEK Athens

Senior career*
| Years | Team | Apps | (Gls) |
| 2010–2012 | AEK Athens | 1 | (0) |
| 2011–2012 | → Fokikos (loan) | 26 | (2) |
| 2012–2013 | Glyfada | 21 | (1) |
| 2013–2014 | Naoussa | 16 | (1) |
| 2014–2015 | Episkopi | 30 | (6) |
| 2015–2017 | Panthrakikos | 19 | (1) |
| 2017 | AO Chania | 16 | (1) |
| 2017–2018 | Chania−Kissamikos | 16 | (0) |
| 2018–2021 | AEEK Synka | 0 | (0) |
| 2021– | Aris Soudas | 0 | (0) |
- * Club domestic league appearances and goals as of 10 June 2018

Georgios Nikoltsis (Greek: Γεώργιος Νικόλτσης; born 6 April 1992) is a Greek professional footballer who plays as a striker for Aris Soudas.

== Honours ==
AEK Athens

- Greek Cup: 2010–11
