= Stamatis Kalamiotis =

Greek footballer

Personal information
- Full name: Stamatios Kalamiotis
- Date of birth: 23 April 1990 (age 36)
- Place of birth: Athens, Greece
- Height: 1.83 m (6 ft 0 in)
- Position: Defender

Youth career
- 2002–2011: AEK Athens

Senior career*
Years	Team	Apps	(Gls)
2009–2010	→ A.O. Nea Ionia (loan)		
2010–2012	AEK Athens	0	(0)
2011	→ Niki Volos (loan)	8	(0)
2011–2012	→ Thrasyvoulos (loan)	17	(0)
2012–2013	Thrasyvoulos	27	(2)
2013–2014	Kallithea	19	(1)
2014–2015	Acharnaikos	11	(1)
2015	Aiolikos		
- * Club domestic league appearances and goals

Stamatis Kalamiotis (Greek: Σταμάτης Καλαμιώτης; born on 23 April 1990) is a Greek former footballer who played as a defender.

== Career ==
=== AEK Athens ===
Kalamiotis began playing football in the academies of AEK Athens. During his days there he was also tested with the men's team under the then manager, Georgios Donis and he competed in two friendly matches with them in 2008. In the summer of 2009 he was loaned to the fourth division side, A.O. Nea Ionia for a season.

On 2 July 2010, Kalamiotis was promoted to the men's team under Dušan Bajević and followed their preparation at Seefeld. He started his career at AEK playing mainly as a centre-back, where he was guided by the experienced Traianos Dellas. Bajevic recognizing his skills and talent included him on the list for the UEFA Europa League. Throughout his first months at the club he was included many times in the team's squad, but without taking competitive minutes. On 28 October he made his debut in an away Cup game against Panthrakikos. The then manager, Manolo Jiménez gave him a starting position, but was not justified by the result. The young Kalamiotis appeared stressed and unstable on the pitch which resulted in him committing a penalty early on in which that the hosts took the lead. Thus, despite the eventual 1–5 victory of the yellow-blacks, he was naturally replaced at half-time. Since at the time was impossible for him to establish in the roster, on 20 January 2011 he was then loaned to the third division side Niki Volos, but his loan was cut short after three months, since the club seemed unable to pay his contract.

=== Thrasyvoulos ===
On 31 August 2011, Kalamiotis was loaned to second division side Thrasyvoulos for a season, where he was established at the club. He made his debut on 13 November in a 1–0 home defeat against AEK Kalloni. The team had a mediocre year and finished at the 12th place. In the summer of 2012, his search of playing time in combination of the dire financial situation of AEK, made them terminate his contract and on 3 September he joined Thrasyvoulos on a permanent deal. He scored his first goal on 10 March against Kavala, when in the 74th minute he shaped the final 1–0 victory for his team at Fyli Municipal Stadium. Kalamiotis played a full season at the club of Fyli, where at the end of which they were relegated.

=== Kallithea ===
Following the club's relegation in the summer of 2013 he left Thrasyvoulos and despite his desire to return to AEK Athens, who declared bankruptcy and were relegated to the third division, he eventually moved to Kallithea, where he spent another season in the second division. On 15 September, he made his debut in the away Cup match against Glyfada, which ended in a 1–0 win. He scored his first goal with the club an away match against Acharnaikos, when in the 79th minute he made the final 2–0 for his team. Despite competing mainly as a right back, Kalamiotis was occasionally used in midfield, leveraging his speed and physicality to contribute in multiple roles. The club managed a 7th-place finish in the Southern Group and didn't win a ticket for the Promotion Group.

=== Later years ===
On 28 July 2014, Kalamiotis signed at another second division club, Acharnaikos. He made his debut on 29 August in the Cup match against Fostiras, where he played for the whole match in a goalless draw. On 2 November Kalamiotis had the opportunity to play against his former club AEK, since the yellow-blacks also competed in the second division during that season. He scored his only goal one week later in the 3–1 home win over Paniliakos. During his time at Acharnes, Kalamiotis committed a disciplinary offense and on 27 January 2015 the management of the club after the proposal of then manager, Georgios Vazakas, terminated his contract. A few days later he continued his career at Aiolikos, where he was united with his teammate at Acharnaikos, Manousakis. Another disciplinary offense by him resulted in the termination of his contract on 4 April 2015.

== Honours ==
AEK Athens

- Greek Cup: 2010–11
