= Nikolaos Karabelas =

Greek footballer

Nikos Karabelas
- Karabelas with AEK Athens in 2011

Personal information
- Full name: Nikolaos Karabelas
- Date of birth: 20 December 1984 (age 41)
- Place of birth: Pyrgos, Greece
- Height: 1.80 m (5 ft 11 in)
- Position: Left back

Senior career*
Years	Team	Apps	(Gls)
2004–2006	Paniliakos	48	(2)
2006–2009	Aris	32	(0)
2009–2012	AEK Athens	70	(0)
2012–2016	Levante	40	(0)
2016	Real Valladolid	11	(0)
2016–2017	Aris	26	(1)
Total		227	(3)

International career^{‡}
2005	Greece U21	3	(0)
2014	Greece	1	(0)
- * Club domestic league appearances and goals as of 17 June 2017 ‡ National team caps and goals as of 14 November 2014

Nikolaos "Nikos" Karabelas (Greek: Νίκος Καράμπελας; born 20 December 1984) is a Greek former footballer who played as a left back.

== Club career ==
Karabelas made his debut with his hometown's Paniliakos in the Beta Ethniki in 2004. Two years later he joined Super League side Aris, and quickly established himself as a starter for the Yellows.

On 28 January 2009 Karabelas missed a penalty in a 0–0 draw against fierce rivals PAOK, which took Aris out of the Greek Cup finals. He subsequently received threats from the club's fans, and left the club in the end of the season.

On 10 June 2009 Karabelas signed a four-year deal with AEK Athens. After struggling to find his form in his debut season under Dušan Bajević, he appeared consistently in his second season, under Manolo Jiménez, and was deemed "irreplaceable" by the latter.

On 26 July 2012 Karabelas moved abroad for the first time in his career, by agreeing to a two-year deal with La Liga side Levante UD. He made his debut with the club on 19 August, starting and playing the full 90 minutes of a 1–1 home draw against Atlético Madrid. Karabelas appeared in only nine matches during the campaign, with the Valencian side achieving a comfortable mid-table finish.

In his second season with the Granotes, he was the most used left-back by manager Joaquín Caparrós, overtaking veteran Juanfran, and signed a new two-year deal on 20 March 2014. On 1 February 2016, after 3,5 years in Levante UD, the Greek defender signed a six months contract with Segunda División club Real Valladolid.

On 30 August 2016, the international left back signed a three-season contract with Aris and returned to the club after seven years. On 8 January 2017 he scored his first goal against Panegialios.

== International career ==
Karabelas was a member of the Greece U21. On 14 May 2014 he was among the 30-man provisional squad for the 2014 FIFA World Cup, but was one of the seven players cut from Fernando Santos' final list.

He made his full international debut on 14 November 2014, in a UEFA Euro 2016 qualifying match against the Faroe Islands in Piraeus. Karabelas played 78 minutes of the shock 0–1 defeat before being replaced by Petros Mantalos.

== Honours ==
AEK Athens

- Greek Cup: 2010–11
