= Serxhio Abdurahmani =

Albanian footballer (born 1992)

Personal information
- Full name: Serxhio Abdurahmani
- Date of birth: 17 July 1992 (age 34)
- Place of birth: Elbasan, Albania
- Height: 1.75 m (5 ft 9 in)
- Position: Forward

Team information
- Current team: AO Kryoneri
- Number: 22

Youth career
- AEK Athens

Senior career*
Years	Team	Apps	(Gls)
2010–2012	AEK Athens	1	(0)
2011–2012	→ Niki Volos (loan)	0	(0)
2012–2013	Fokikos	9	(1)
2013	Kukësi	3	(0)
2013	Vyzas Megara	4	(0)
2014	Panelefsiniakos	0	(0)
2014	Mandraikos	0	(0)
2015	Rouvas	33	(13)
2016	Atsalenios	26	(3)
2017	Triglia Rafinas	1	(0)
2018-2022	Olympiacos Agios Stefanos	49	(14)
2022-	Kryoneri	16	(1)
- * Club domestic league appearances and goals as of 13 January 2015

Serxhio Abdurahmani (born 17 July 1992) is an Albanian footballer currently playing for Kryoneri in Greece, as a forward. Abdurahmani has played for 12 clubs throughout his career including AEK Athens.
