= Panagiotis Lagos =

Greek footballer (born in 1985)

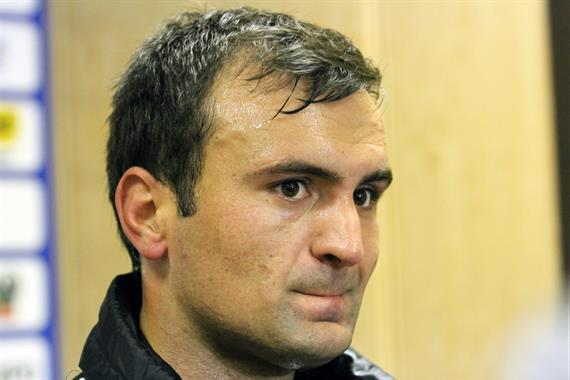

Personal information
- Full name: Panagiotis Lagos
- Date of birth: 18 July 1985 (age 41)
- Place of birth: Thessaloniki, Greece
- Height: 1.82 m (6 ft 0 in)
- Positions: Wingback; fullback; midfielder

Senior career*
Years	Team	Apps	(Gls)
2002–2006	Iraklis	76	(10)
2006–2013	AEK Athens	110	(3)
2013–2014	Vorskla Poltava	11	(0)
2014–2016	Apollon Smyrnis	38	(3)

International career^{‡}
2003–2005	Greece U-21	22	(3)
2004	Greece Olympic	3	(0)
2006–2011	Greece	9	(0)
- * Club domestic league appearances and goals as of 12 September 2017 ‡ National team caps and goals as of 25 October 2010

Panagiotis Lagos (Greek: Παναγιώτης Λαγός; born 18 July 1985) is a Greek former professional footballer. Lagos had the ability to play in various positions as much as on the wings as on the center, due to the combination of the speed and technique of his play.

== Club career ==
=== Iraklis ===
Born in Thessaloniki, Lagos started his professional football career at Iraklis in 2002. Having made 76 appearances for the club, he became one of the most important players in qualifying for Europe during the 2005–06 season.

=== AEK Athens ===
Lagos was a target of some Greek clubs, Olympiacos, Panathinaikos and PAOK. In the summer of 2006 Lagos was transferred to AEK Athens for €1 million. Lagos scored his first goal for AEK Athens against Atromitos in a 4–0 home win. In his first season at AEK, Lagos started his career with AEK before suffering a serious injury on his right leg in 2007, forcing him out of football for two years, and made his comeback near the end of the 2008–2009 season. Lagos' first game back from his injury was in a derby match against Panathinaikos. Lagos was a regular in the AEK Athens starting line-up, being played as a left wingback.

In 2010, Lagos renewed his contract with the club, signing a new three-year deal which kept him at the club until 2013. Lagos scored 2 goals against AEL which led AEK winning 2–3. Lagos again suffered a knee injury against Anderlecht, which forced him out of football for three months. Lagos made his comeback against Ergotelis, where the match finished 1–1.

=== Vorskla Poltava ===
On 29 January 2013 Lagos signed a one-and-a-half-year contract with the Ukrainian club Vorskla Poltava. He made his debut with the club on 3 March 2013 in an away 1–0 loss from Chernomorets. On 3 March 2014, due to the political and military problems in Ukraine, Lagos decided to end his contract with the club

=== Apollon Smyrnis ===
On 9 July 2014 the "Light Brigade" announced the acquisition of Panagiotis Lagos. The 29-year-old full back-midfielder signed a one-year contract with the club and will play for Football League. Lagos will be found for the first time in his career in a minor league in Greece, after his presence in Iraklis and AEK Athens (clubs that he scored a total of 186 appearances, 13 goals and 14 assists in 11 seasons).

== International career ==
Lagos made his debut for Greece in 2006 against Korea Republic. Due to his injury, Lagos has been dropped from the national side. Lagos has played 9 times for Greece.

Lagos competed for Greece at the 2004 Summer Olympics.

Lagos was recalled to the Greece squad by Fernando Santos to play against Malta in a Euro 2012 qualifier and a friendly match against Poland.

== Career statistics ==
Appearances and goals by club, season and competition
Club	Season	League			Cup (Note: Includes Greek Cup and Ukrainian Cup)		Europe		Total	
Club	Season	Division	Apps	Goals	Apps	Goals	Apps	Goals	Apps	Goals
Iraklis	2002–03	Alpha Ethniki	6	0	0	0	0	0	3	0
Iraklis	2003–04	Alpha Ethniki	17	0	4	0	0	0	21	0
Iraklis	2004–05	Alpha Ethniki	25	3	5	0	0	0	30	3
Iraklis	2005–06	Alpha Ethniki	28	7	1	0	0	0	29	7
AEK Athens	2006–07	Super League Greece	10	1	1	0	4	0	15	1
AEK Athens	2007–08	Super League Greece	15	0	1	0	1	0	17	0
AEK Athens	2008–09	Super League Greece	14	0	1	0	2	0	17	0
AEK Athens	2009–10	Super League Greece	15	0	0	0	0	0	15	0
AEK Athens	2010–11	Super League Greece	27	2	5	1	7	0	39	3
AEK Athens	2011–12	Super League Greece	19	0	0	0	6	0	25	0
AEK Athens	2012–13	Super League Greece	10	0	1	0	0	0	11	0
Vorskla Poltava	2012-13	Ukrainian Premier League	10	0	0	0	0	0	10	0
Vorskla Poltava	2013–14	Ukrainian Premier League	1	0	0	0	0	0	1	0
Apollon Smyrnis	2014–15	Football League Greece	29	3	7	0	0	0	36	3
Apollon Smyrnis	2015–16	Football League Greece	9	0	3	0	0	0	12	0
Career total			235	16	29	1	20	0	284	17

=== International ===
Greece national team
Year	Apps	Goals
2006	6	0
2008	2	0
2011	1	0
Total	9	0

Last updated: 2012-09-08
Source: Panagiotis Lagos at National-Football-Teams.com

== Honours ==
AEK Athens

- Greek Cup: 2010–11

Individual

- Greek Young Footballer of the year: 2004–05, 2005–06
