= Leonardo (footballer, born September 1986) =

Brazilian footballer

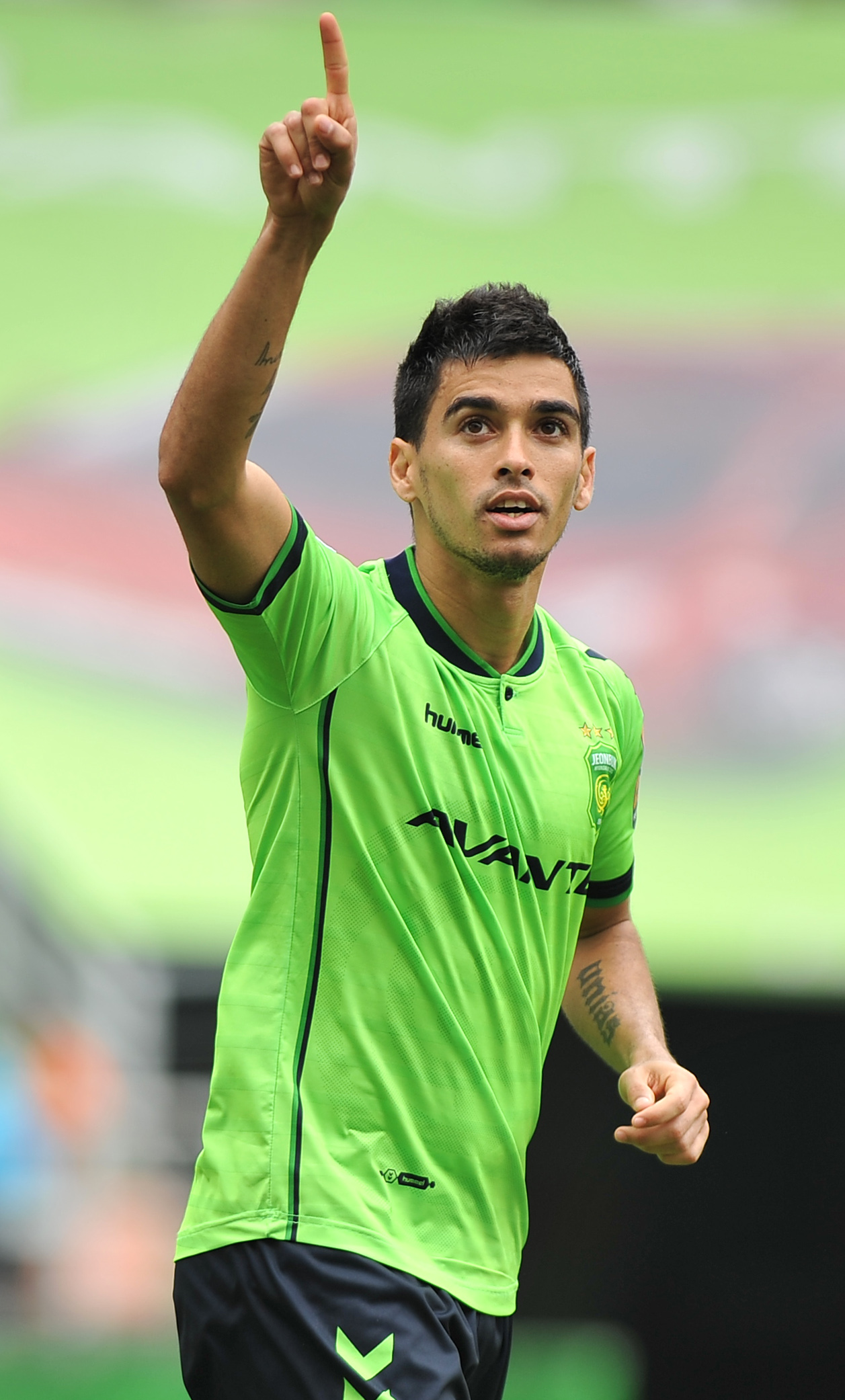
- Leonardo playing for Jeonbuk in 2015

Personal information
- Full name: Leonardo Rodrigues Perreira
- Date of birth: September 22, 1986 (age 40)
- Place of birth: Vila Velha, Brazil
- Height: 1.73 m (5 ft 8 in)
- Positions: Attacking midfielder; winger

Senior career*
Years	Team	Apps	(Gls)
2005	Desportiva Capixaba		
2005–2007	Thrasyvoulos	49	(16)
2007–2009	Levadiakos	54	(16)
2009–2012	AEK Athens	87	(20)
2012–2016	Jeonbuk Hyundai Motors	161	(40)
2016–2019	Al Jazira	39	(18)
2017–2018	→ Al-Nassr (loan)	24	(10)
2019	Tianjin Tianhai	11	(1)
2020	Shandong Luneng Taishan	6	(0)
2021–2022	Al Dhafra	6	(0)
Total		437	(121)

International career
2004–2006	Brazil U17	5	(3)
2006	Brazil U20	13	(3)
- * Club domestic league appearances and goals as of 31 December 2020

Leonardo Rodrigues Pereira or simply Leonardo (born September 22, 1986) is a Brazilian professional footballer. Leonardo usually plays as an attacking midfielder but can also play as a winger.

== Club career ==
Leonardo was born in Vila Velha, Brazil.

On July 30, 2009, Leonardo signed a five-year contract with AEK Athens. On August 20, Leonardo made his official debut for AEK, in the game versus Vaslui in the Europa League. Leonardo made his league debut in the 1–0 away win over Atromitos on August 30. He scored his first goal for AEK on December 6, against Panionios.

In the Greek playoffs home 4–2 win against Aris, Leonardo came in as a substitute in the 51st minute and scored twice. AEK's next fixture was facing Aris again, held in Kleanthis Vikelidis Stadium. The score was 1–0 against AEK, and Leonardo (who had also come in as a substitute that match) made the score 1–1 and equalized in injury time, giving AEK an invaluable point. In the 2011–12 season, he played in 26 matches scoring 9 goals, and was the club top scorer in the league.

== Personal life ==
Leonardo is married to Kamilla Fiorese Da Silva, and the couple has three daughters[Kauany ,Nicoly and Zoi]. Leonardo, who moved to Greece at the age of 18, speaks fluent Greek.

== Career statistics ==
=== Club ===
Appearances and goals by club, season and competition
Club	Season	League			National cup		League cup		Continental		Other		Total	
Club	Season	Division	Apps	Goals	Apps	Goals	Apps	Goals	Apps	Goals	Apps	Goals	Apps	Goals
Thrasyvoulos	2005–06	Beta Ethniki	23	10	1	0	—		—		—		24	10
Thrasyvoulos	2006–07	Beta Ethniki	26	6	2	1	—		—		—		28	7
Thrasyvoulos	Total		49	16	3	1	—		—		—		52	17
Levadiakos	2007–08	Super League Greece	27	6	1	0	—		—		—		28	6
Levadiakos	2008–09	Super League Greece	27	10	1	0	—		—		—		28	10
Levadiakos	Total		54	16	2	0	—		—		—		56	16
AEK Athens	2009–10	Super League Greece	29	5	1	0	—		7 (Note: Appearances in UEFA Europa League)	0	—		37	5
AEK Athens	2010–11	Super League Greece	26	5	2	1	—		7	0	—		35	6
AEK Athens	2011–12	Super League Greece	32	10	1	0	—		7	3	—		40	13
AEK Athens	Total		87	20	4	1	—		21	3	—		112	24
Jeonbuk Hyundai	2012	K League Classic	17	5	1	0	—		—		—		18	5
Jeonbuk Hyundai	2013	K League Classic	37	7	4	2	—		7 (Note: Appearances in AFC Champions League)	0	—		48	9
Jeonbuk Hyundai	2014	K League Classic	36	6	3	0	—		8	2	—		47	8
Jeonbuk Hyundai	2015	K League Classic	37	10	2	0	—		10	2	—		49	12
Jeonbuk Hyundai	2016	K League Classic	34	12	3	2	—		14	10	2 (Note: Appearances in FIFA Club World Cup)	0	53	24
Jeonbuk Hyundai	Total		161	40	13	4	—		39	14	2	0	215	58
Al Jazira	2016–17	UAE Pro League	14	6	0	0	—		0	0	—		14	6
Al Jazira	2018–19	UAE Pro League	25	12	1	0	6	3	—		—		32	15
Al Jazira	Total		39	18	1	0	6	3	0	0	—		46	21
Al-Nassr (loan)	2017–18	Saudi Pro League	24	10	3	1	—		—		—		27	11
Tianjin Tianhai	2019	Chinese Super League	11	1	1	0	—		—		—		12	1
Shandong Luneng	2020	Chinese Super League	6	0	0	0	—		—		—		6	0
Al-Dhafra	2021–22	UAE Pro League	6	0	1	0	6	0	—		—		13	0
Career total			437	121	27	6	12	3	60	17	2	0	539	148

== Honours ==
AEK Athens

- Greek Cup: 2010–11

Jeonbuk Hyundai Motors

- K League Classic: 2014, 2015
- AFC Champions League: 2016

Al Jazira Club

- UAE Arabian Gulf League: 2016–17

Individual

- K League Best XI: 2013, 2016
