= 2016–17 Greek Football Cup =

2016–17 Greek Cup

Tournament details
- Country: Greece
- Teams: 34

Final positions
- Champions: PAOK (5th title)
- Runners-up: AEK Athens

Tournament statistics
- Matches played: 81
- Goals scored: 208 (2.57 per match)
- Top goal scorer(s): Abiola Dauda (5 goals)

The 2016–17 Greek Football Cup was the 75th edition of the Greek Football Cup. Just as last year's edition, a total of 34 clubs were accepted to enter. The competition commenced on 14 September 2016 with the preliminary round and concluded on 6 May 2017 with the Final. The winner of the competition was PAOK for fifth time.

== Teams ==
Round	Clubs remaining	Clubs involved	Winners from previous round	New entries	Leagues entering
Preliminary round	34	4	none	4	Football League
Group stage	32	32	2	30	Super League
Round of 16	16	16	16	none	none
Quarter-finals	8	8	8	none	none
Semi-finals	4	4	4	none	none
Final	2	2	2	none	none

== Calendar ==
Round	Date(s)	Fixtures	Clubs	New entries
Preliminary round	14, 17, 18 September 2016	4	34 → 32	4
Group stage	25–27 October, 29, 30 November & 1, 13–15 December 2016	48	32 → 16	30
Round of 16	10–12, 24–26, 31 January, 1, 2 February 2017	16	16 → 8	none
Quarter-finals	8, 9 February & 1, 2 March 2017	8	8 → 4	none
Semi-finals	12, 13, 26, 27 April 2017	4	4 → 2	none
Final	6 May 2017	1	2 → 1	none

== Participating clubs ==
2016–17 Super League	2016–17 Football League
AEK Athens; AEL; Asteras Tripolis; Atromitos; Iraklis; Kerkyra; Levadiakos; Olympiacos; Panathinaikos; Panetolikos; Panionios; PAOK; PAS Giannina; Platanias; Veria; Xanthi	Acharnaikos; AEL Kalloni; Agrotikos Asteras; Aiginiakos; Anagennisi Karditsa; Apollon Smyrnis; Aris; Chania; Kallithea; Kissamikos; Lamia; OFI; Panegialios; Panelefsiniakos; Panserraikos; Panthrakikos; Sparta; Trikala

== Preliminary round ==
The draw for this round took place on 24 August 2016.

=== Summary ===
Team 1	Agg.	Team 2	1st leg	2nd leg
Panegialios	1–5	Sparta	0–4	1–1
OFI	2–0	Acharnaikos	0–0	2–0

=== Matches ===
14 September 2016
16:00 EEST

Panegialios	0–4	Sparta
	Report	Anastasakos 24', 75'; Bountopoulos 85'; Vellinis 87' (pen.)

Panetolikos Stadium, Agrinio
Referee: Giorgos Michailidis (Boeotia)
17 September 2016
15:00 EEST

Sparta	1–1	Panegialios
Iliopoulos 34'	Report	Vlachos 67'

Levadia Municipal Stadium, Livadeia
Referee: Michalis Antipariotis (East Attica)

Sparta won 5–1 on aggregate.

14 September 2016
16:00 EEST

OFI	0–0	Acharnaikos
	Report

Theodoros Vardinogiannis Stadium, Heraklion
Referee: Spyros Stathopoulos (West Attica)
18 September 2016
15:00 EEST

Acharnaikos	0–2	OFI
	Report	Vouho 12'; Randy 88'

Nea Smyrni Stadium, Nea Smyrni
Referee: Konstantinos Antoniou (Athens)

OFI won 2–0 on aggregate.

== Group stage ==
The draw for this round took place on 29 September 2016.

Pot 1 (Super League)
Team
Olympiacos
PAOK
Panathinaikos
AEK Athens
Panionios
PAS Giannina
Asteras Tripolis
Atromitos

Pot 2 (Super League)
Team
Platanias
Levadiakos
Panetolikos
Iraklis
Xanthi
Veria
AEL
Kerkyra

Pot 3 (Football League)
Team
Agrotikos Asteras
Trikala
Anagennisi Karditsa
OFI
Chania
Kissamikos
Kallithea
Aris

Pot 4 (Football League)
Team
Aiginiakos
Apollon Smyrnis
AEL Kalloni
Lamia
Panelefsiniakos
Panthrakikos
Panserraikos
Sparta

=== Group A ===
Pos	Team	Pld	W	D	L	GF	GA	GD	Pts	Qualification	PAOK	TRI	AEL	PNE
1	PAOK	3	2	1	0	9	0	+9	7	Round of 16		—	2–0	—
2	Trikala	3	2	1	0	6	0	+6	7	Round of 16	0–0		1–0	—
3	AEL	3	1	0	2	2	4	−2	3		—	—		2–1
4	Panelefsiniakos	3	0	0	3	1	14	−13	0		0–7	0–5	—	

Source: epo.gr
26 October 2016
17:15 EEST

PAOK	2–0	AEL
Mystakidis 28'; Pereyra 41'	Report

Toumba Stadium, Thessaloniki
Referee: Ananias Fotiadis (Serres)
26 October 2016
15:00 EEST

Panelefsiniakos	0–5	Trikala
	Report	Kouskounas 12', 23'; Tsoupros 44' (o.g.); Baykara 78'; Giannitsanis 87'

Municipal Stadium of Elefsina, Elefsina
Referee: Andreas Gamaris (Athens)

30 November 2016
15:00 EET

AEL	2–1	Panelefsiniakos
Dodô 29'; Avraam 54'	Report	Angeloudis 51'

AEL FC Arena, Larissa
Referee: Manolis Skoulas (Thessaly)
1 December 2016
17:15 EET

Trikala	0–0	PAOK
	Report

Trikala Municipal Stadium, Trikala
Referee: Alexandros Katsikogiannis (Epirus)

14 December 2016
19:30 EET

Trikala	1–0	PAOK
Giannitsanis 90'	Report

Trikala Municipal Stadium, Trikala
Referee: Aristidis Vatsios (West Attica)
14 December 2016
19:30 EET

Panelefsiniakos	0–7	PAOK
	Report	Athanasiadis 48'; Pereyra 51'; Shakhov 58'; Mystakidis 70'; Koulouris 75'; Pelkas 77', 90'

Municipal Stadium of Elefsina, Elefsina
Referee: Andreas Gamaris (Athens)

=== Group B ===
Pos	Team	Pld	W	D	L	GF	GA	GD	Pts	Qualification	OLY	PLA	SPA	CHA
1	Olympiacos	3	3	0	0	8	0	+8	9	Round of 16		3–0	—	—
2	Platanias	3	2	0	1	3	4	−1	6	Round of 16	—		1–0	—
3	Sparta	3	1	0	2	4	2	+2	3		0–1	—		4–0
4	Chania	3	0	0	3	1	10	−9	0		0–4	1–2	—	

Source: epo.gr
26 October 2016
19:30 EEST

Olympiacos	3–0	Platanias
Pardo 5', 66'; Elabdellaoui 68'	Report

Karaiskakis Stadium, Piraeus
Referee: Evangelos Evangelou (Athens)
27 October 2016
15:00 EEST

Sparta	4–0	Chania
Bountopoulos 2'; Anastasakos 49'; Anastasopoulos 67'; Arsenijević 87'	Report

Sparta Municipal Stadium, Sparta
Referee: Spyros Michelis (Piraeus)

29 November 2016
15:00 EET

Platanias	1–0	Sparta
Goundoulakis 51'	Report

Perivolia Municipal Stadium, Chania
Referee: Giannis Mourtzakis (Heraklion)
1 December 2016
19:30 EET

Chania	0–4	Olympiacos
	Report	Cambiasso 16'; Ideye 25'; Theologou 42' (o.g.); Pardo 49'

Perivolia Municipal Stadium, Chania
Referee: Spyros Selimos (Laconia)

14 December 2016
15:00 EET

Chania	1–2	Platanias
Dilaver 4'	Report	Giakoumakis 24'; Dinas 30'

Perivolia Municipal Stadium, Chania
Referee: Giannis Mourtzakis (Heraklion)
15 December 2016
15:00 EET

Sparta	0–1	Olympiacos
	Report	Manthatis 65'

Sparta Municipal Stadium, Sparta
Referee: Aristotelis Diamantopoulos (Arcadia)

=== Group C ===
Pos	Team	Pld	W	D	L	GF	GA	GD	Pts	Qualification	OFI	PAO	IRA	APS
1	OFI	3	2	0	1	4	3	+1	6	Round of 16		2–1	2–1	—
2	Panathinaikos	3	1	1	1	5	5	0	4	Round of 16	—		0–0	—
3	Iraklis	3	1	1	1	4	2	+2	4		—	—		3–0
4	Apollon Smyrnis	3	1	0	2	4	7	−3	3		1–0	3–4	—	

Source: epo.gr
25 October 2016
17:15 EEST

Apollon Smyrnis	1–0	OFI
Kassos 69'	Report

Georgios Kamaras Stadium, Rizoupoli
Referee: Nikolaos Makrypodis (Achaea)
27 October 2016
19:30 EEST

Panathinaikos	0–0	Iraklis
	Report

Leoforos Alexandras Stadium, Ampelokipoi
Referee: Dimitrios Karantonis (Imathia)

30 November 2016
17:15 EET

Iraklis	3–0	Apollon Smyrnis
Pasas 32', 43'; Kouros 87'	Report

Kaftanzoglio Stadium, Thessaloniki
Referee: Stefanos Koubarakis (Thrace)
30 November 2016
19:30 EET

OFI	2–1	Panathinaikos
Chanti 69'; Ogkmpoe 84'	Report	Berg 31'

Theodoros Vardinogiannis Stadium, Heraklion
Referee: Ioannis Papadopoulos (Macedonia)

14 December 2016
19:30 EET

OFI	2–1	Iraklis
Ogkmpoe 37'; Vouho 75'	Report	Loukinas 90+1'

Theodoros Vardinogiannis Stadium, Heraklion
Referee: Alexandros Tsamouris (Piraeus)
14 December 2016
19:30 EET

Apollon Smyrnis	3–4	Panathinaikos
Siatravanis 11', 43', 76'	Report	Berg 54'; M'Poku 61'; Leto 65'; Dasios 74' (o.g.)

Georgios Kamaras Stadium, Rizoupoli
Referee: Athanasios Tzilos (Larissa)

=== Group D ===
Pos	Team	Pld	W	D	L	GF	GA	GD	Pts	Qualification	PAS	XAN	AGR	KAL
1	PAS Giannina	3	3	0	0	5	1	+4	9	Round of 16		1–0	—	—
2	Xanthi	3	1	1	1	4	3	+1	4	Round of 16	—		—	3–1
3	Agrotikos Asteras	3	1	1	1	3	3	0	4		0–1	1–1		—
4	AEL Kalloni	3	0	0	3	3	8	−5	0		1–3	—	1–2	

Source: epo.gr
25 October 2016
15:00 EEST

AEL Kalloni	1–2	Agrotikos Asteras
Frangos 18'	Report	Tegousis 54'; Taianan 86'

Mytilene Municipal Stadium, Mytilene
Referee: Angelos Zaravinos (Athens)
26 October 2016
15:00 EEST

PAS Giannina	1–0	Xanthi
Maboulou 15'	Report

Zosimades Stadium, Ioannina
Referee: Ioannis Papadopoulos (Macedonia)

29 November 2016
15:00 EET

Agrotikos Asteras	0–1	PAS Giannina
	Report	Donis 40'

Agrotikos Asteras Stadium, Evosmos
Referee: Evangelos Kiotzenis (Kavala)
1 December 2016
15:00 EET

Xanthi	3–1	AEL Kalloni
Ranos 3'; Lazić 23'; Nieto 47'	Report	Frangos 70'

Xanthi FC Arena, Xanthi
Referee: Ananias Fotiadis (Serres)

13 December 2016
15:00 EET

Agrotikos Asteras	1–1	Xanthi
Triantafyllakos 67' (pen.)	Report	Nieto 56'

Agrotikos Asteras Stadium, Evosmos
Referee: Alexandros Aretopoulos (Trikala)
15 December 2016
17:00 EET

AEL Kalloni	1–3	PAS Giannina
Triantafyllou 83'	Report	Giakos 5'; Garoufalias 42'; Skondras 62'

Mytilene Municipal Stadium, Mytilene
Referee: Spyros Michelis (Piraeus)

=== Group E ===
Pos	Team	Pld	W	D	L	GF	GA	GD	Pts	Qualification	AST	ARIS	AIG	VER
1	Asteras Tripolis	3	2	1	0	8	4	+4	7	Round of 16		—	—	1–0
2	Aris	3	1	2	0	6	3	+3	5	Round of 16	3–3		—	0–0
3	Aiginiakos	3	1	0	2	2	7	−5	3		1–4	0–3		—
4	Veria	3	0	1	2	0	2	−2	1		—	—	0–1	

Source: epo.gr
25 October 2016
15:00 EEST

Aiginiakos	0–3	Aris
	Report	Kapnidis 19'; Milunović 71', 82'

Veria Stadium, Veria
Referee: Evangelos Gratsanis (Trikala)
27 October 2016
17:15 EEST

Asteras Tripolis	1–0	Veria
Tsoukalas 90+5'	Report

Theodoros Kolokotronis Stadium, Tripoli
Referee: Christos Mitsios (Epirus)

29 November 2016
17:15 EET

Aris	3–3	Asteras Tripolis
Bargan 25'; Tatos 85' (pen.), 87'	Report	Mazza 14'; Ioannidis 29'; Tsilianidis 72'

Kleanthis Vikelidis Stadium, Thessaloniki
Referee: Dimitrios Karantonis (Imathia)
29 November 2016
17:15 EET

Veria	0–1	Aiginiakos
	Report	Zourkos 84'

Veria Stadium, Veria
Referee: Konstantinos Balatsoukas (Epirus)

13 December 2016
15:00 EET

Aris	0–0	Veria
	Report

Kleanthis Vikelidis Stadium, Thessaloniki
Referee: Dionysis Zougras (Kozani)
13 December 2016
15:00 EEST

Aiginiakos	1–4	Asteras Tripolis
Gourtsas 11'	Report	Iglesias 7'; Tsilianidis 31'; Mazza 55'; Stanisavljević 88' (pen.)

Giannis Paralikidis Stadium, Aiginio
Referee: Ananias Fotiadis (Serres)

=== Group F ===
Pos	Team	Pld	W	D	L	GF	GA	GD	Pts	Qualification	AEK	LAM	KER	ASA
1	AEK Athens	3	1	2	0	6	2	+4	5	Round of 16		—	4–0	—
2	Lamia	3	1	2	0	3	2	+1	5	Round of 16	0–0		—	1–0
3	Kerkyra	3	1	1	1	8	6	+2	4		—	2–2		—
4	Anagennisi Karditsa	3	0	1	2	2	9	−7	1		2–2	—	0–6	

Source: epo.gr
25 October 2016
19:30 EEST

AEK Athens	4–0	Kerkyra
Galo 7'; Christodoulopoulos 78'; Pekhart 80'; Diogo 89' (o.g.)	Report

Olympic Stadium, Marousi
Attendance: 2,500
Referee: Evangelos Kiotzenis (Xanthi)
27 October 2016
17:15 EEST

Lamia	1–0	Anagennisi Karditsa
Blažić 30' (pen.)	Report

Lamia Municipal Stadium, Lamia
Referee: Manolis Skoulas (Thessaly)

29 November 2016
19:30 EET

Anagennisi Karditsa	2–2	AEK Athens
Tzekos 68'; Maïga 76'	Report	Pekhart 36', 47'

Municipal Stadium of Karditsa, Karditsa
Referee: Aristeidis Vatsios (West Attica)
30 November 2016
15:00 EET

Kerkyra	2–2	Lamia
Kontos 12'; Cennamo 55' (o.g.)	Report	Wanderson 17'; Omo 43'

Kerkyra Stadium, Corfu
Referee: Aristeidis Vatsios (West Attica)

14 December 2016
17:15 EET

Lamia	0–0	AEK Athens
	Report

Lamia Municipal Stadium, Lamia
Attendance: 4,500
Referee: Manolis Skoulas (Thessaly)
14 December 2016
17:15 EET

Anagennisi Karditsa	0–6	Kerkyra
	Report	Andreopoulos 4', 58'; Georgiou 23'; Epstein 45'; Georgakopoulos 52', 75'

Municipal Stadium of Karditsa, Karditsa
Referee: Georgios Tzovaras (Phthiotis)

=== Group G ===
Pos	Team	Pld	W	D	L	GF	GA	GD	Pts	Qualification	ATR	PNT	PTH	KLT
1	Atromitos	3	2	0	1	4	1	+3	6	Round of 16		1–0	—	—
2	Panetolikos	3	2	0	1	6	2	+4	6	Round of 16	—		1–0	—
3	Panthrakikos	3	1	0	2	3	4	−1	3		0–3	—		3–0
4	Kallithea	3	1	0	2	2	8	−6	3		1–0	1–5	—	

Source: epo.gr
25 October 2016
17:15 EEST

Panthrakikos	3–0	Kallithea
Nikoltsis 36'; Iliadis 56'; Kardaris 90+6'	Report

Komotini Municipal Stadium, Komotini
Referee: Georgios Vreskas (Pieria)
26 October 2016
17:15 EEST

Atromitos	1–0	Panetolikos
Baga 65'	Report

Peristeri Stadium, Peristeri
Referee: Marios Lampropoulos (Elis)

30 November 2016
15:00 EET

Panetolikos	1–0	Panthrakikos
Warda 12' (pen.)	Report

Panetolikos Stadium, Agrinio
Referee: Nikolaos Poulimas (Corfu)
1 December 2016
17:15 EET

Kallithea	1–0	Atromitos
Stamatakos 55'	Report

Grigoris Lambrakis Stadium, Kallithea
Referee: Aristotelis Diamantopoulos (Arcadia)

14 December 2016
15:00 EET

Kallithea	1–5	Panetolikos
Mako 84'	Report	Rosa 15', 72'; Markovski 20', 27'; Clésio 38'

Grigoris Lambrakis Stadium, Kallithea
Referee: Spyros Selimos (Laconia)
14 December 2016
15:00 EET

Panthrakikos	0–3	Atromitos
	Report	Tonso 11', 53'; Bastakos 13'

Komotini Municipal Stadium, Komotini
Referee: Evangelos Kiotzenis (Kavala)

=== Group H ===
Pos	Team	Pld	W	D	L	GF	GA	GD	Pts	Qualification	KIS	LEV	PGSS	PNS
1	Kissamikos	3	2	1	0	6	1	+5	7	Round of 16		1–1	3–0	—
2	Levadiakos	3	1	2	0	4	2	+2	5	Round of 16	—		—	3–1
3	Panionios	3	1	1	1	3	3	0	4		—	0–0		—
4	Panserraikos	3	0	0	3	1	8	−7	0		0–2	—	0–3	

Source: epo.gr
Rules for classification: 1. Points 2. Head-to-head points 3. Head-to-head goal difference 4. Goals scored 5. Goals against 6. Play-offs (neutral ground).
26 October 2016
15:00 EEST

Panionios	0–0	Levadiakos
	Report

Nea Smyrni Stadium, Nea Smyrni
Referee: Nikolaos Poulimas (Corfu)
27 October 2016
15:00 EEST

Panserraikos	0–2	Kissamikos
	Report	Boula 30'; Theos 75'

Serres Municipal Stadium, Serres
Referee: Lampros Papargyriou (Pieria)

1 December 2016
15:00 EET

Levadiakos	3–1	Panserraikos
Pappas 1'; Ouon 13'; Giakoumakis 41'	Report	Kakko 66'

Levadia Municipal Stadium, Livadeia
Referee: Konstantinos Antoniou (Athens)
7 December 2016
15:00 EET

Kissamikos	3–0	Panionios
Martínez 29', 90+1' (pen.); Mantzis 75'	Report

Maleme Stadium, Maleme
Referee: Georgios Foukakis (Heraklion)

13 December 2016
15:00 EET

Kissamikos	1–1	Levadiakos
Vlachos 27'	Report	Giakoumakis 50'

Maleme Stadium, Maleme
Referee: Charalampos Sotiriadis (Lasithi)
15 December 2016
15:00 EET

Panserraikos	0–3	Panionios
	Report	Ngog 72', 75'; Piniotis 81'

Serres Municipal Stadium, Serres
Referee: Athanasios Sezos (Kilkis)

== Knockout phase ==
Each tie in the knockout phase, apart from the final, was played over two legs, with each team playing one leg at home. The team that scored more goals on aggregate over the two legs advanced to the next round. If the aggregate score was level, the away goals rule was applied, i.e. the team that scored more goals away from home over the two legs advanced. If away goals were also equal, then extra time was played. The away goals rule was again applied after extra time, i.e. if there were goals scored during extra time and the aggregate score was still level, the visiting team advanced by virtue of more away goals scored. If no goals were scored during extra time, the winners were decided by a penalty shoot-out. In the final, which were played as a single match, if the score was level at the end of normal time, extra time was played, followed by a penalty shoot-out if the score was still level.
The mechanism of the draws for each round is as follows:

- In the draw for the round of 16, the eight group winners are seeded, and the eight group runners-up are unseeded.
  The seeded teams are drawn against the unseeded teams, with the seeded teams hosting the second leg.
- In the draws for the quarter-finals onwards, there are no seedings, and teams from the same group can be drawn against each other.

== Bracket ==
Round of 16
1	Panathinaikos	3	4	7
16	Kissamikos	0	0	0
8	Trikala	0	0	0
9	Asteras Tripolis	2	1	3
5	Xanthi (a)	1	1	2
12	OFI	0	2	2
4	Panetolikos	0	1	1
13	PAOK	2	4	6
6	Aris	1	0	1
11	Olympiacos	1	2	3
3	Lamia	2	0	2
14	Atromitos	2	2	4
7	Platanias (a.e.t.)	1	2	3
10	PAS Giannina	0	1	1
2	Levadiakos	0	0	0
15	AEK Athens	1	6	7

Quarter-finals
Panathinaikos	4	1	1
Asteras Tripolis	0	0	0
Xanthi	1	1	2
PAOK (a)	2	0	2
Olympiacos	0	2	2
Atromitos	0	1	1
Platanias	0	0	0
AEK Athens	0	3	3

Semi-finals
Panathinaikos	2	0	2
PAOK	0	4	4
Olympiacos	1	1	2
AEK Athens (a)	2	0	2

Final
PAOK	2
AEK Athens	1

== Round of 16 ==
The draw for this round took place on 20 December 2016.

=== Seeding ===
Seeded teams Team PAOK Olympiacos OFI PAS Giannina Asteras Tripolis AEK Athens Atromitos Kissamikos	Unseeded teams Team Trikala Platanias Panathinaikos Xanthi Aris Lamia Panetolikos Levadiakos

=== Summary ===
Team 1	Agg.	Team 2	1st leg	2nd leg
Xanthi	2–2 (a)	OFI	1–0	1–2
Platanias	3–1	PAS Giannina	1–0	2–1 (a.e.t.)
Levadiakos	0–7	AEK Athens	0–1	0–6
Aris	1–3	Olympiacos	1–1	0–2
Panetolikos	1–6	PAOK	0–2	1–4
Trikala	0–3	Asteras Tripolis	0–2	0–1
Lamia	2–4	Atromitos	2–2	0–2
Panathinaikos	7–0	Kissamikos	3–0	4–0

=== Matches ===
24 January 2017
17:15 EET

Xanthi	1–0	OFI
Mitropoulos 40' (o.g.)	Report

Xanthi FC Arena, Xanthi
Referee: Stefanos Koubarakis (Thrace)
31 January 2017
16:00 EET

OFI	2–1	Xanthi
Chanti 21'; Vouho 66'	Report	Lucero 76'

Theodoros Vardinogiannis Stadium, Heraklion
Referee: Aristidis Vatsios (West Attica)

Xanthi won on away goals.

26 January 2017
17:15 EET

Platanias	1–0	PAS Giannina
Apostolopoulos 49'	Report

Perivolia Municipal Stadium, Chania
Referee: Giorgos Blanas (Messinia)
1 February 2017
17:15 EET

PAS Giannina	1–2 (a.e.t.)	Platanias
Jairo 84'	Report	Llorente 113' (pen.); Manousos 120'

Zosimades Stadium, Ioannina
Attendance: Giannis Delfakis (Arcadia)

Platanias won 3–1 on aggregate.

25 January 2017
15:00 EET

Levadiakos	0–1	AEK Athens
	Report	Bakasetas 71'

Levadia Municipal Stadium, Livadeia
Attendance: 150
Referee: Evangelos Evangelou (Athens)
1 February 2017
19:30 EET

AEK Athens	6–0	Levadiakos
Bakasetas 21'; Araujo 28', 61'; Vargas 68'; Kolovetsios 79'; Galanopoulos 84'	Report

Olympic Stadium, Marousi
Attendance: 3,000
Referee: Georgios Giannoulakis (Chania)

AEK Athens won 7–0 on aggregate.

25 January 2017
19:30 EET

Aris	1–1	Olympiacos
Figueiras 13' (o.g.)	Report	Ansarifard 81'

Kleanthis Vikelidis Stadium, Thessaloniki
Referee: Triantafyllos Tikas (Karditsa)
2 February 2017
19:30 EET

Olympiacos	2–0	Aris
Cissokho 50'; Nikolaou 86'	Report

Karaiskakis Stadium, Piraeus
Referee: Spyros Selimos (Laconia)

Olympiacos won 3–1 on aggregate.

11 January 2017
17:15 EET

Panetolikos	0–2	PAOK
	Report	Kitsiou 77'; Athanasiadis 84' (pen.)

Panetolikos Stadium, Agrinio
Referee: Ioannis Neofytiadis (Corinthia)
26 January 2017
19:30 EET

PAOK	4–1	Panetolikos
Shakhov 53'; Deligiannidis 42'; Biseswar 43'; Prijović 78' (pen.)	Report	Paulo 90+3'

Toumba Stadium, Thessaloniki
Referee: Vangelis Kiotzenis (Thrace)

PAOK won 6–1 on aggregate.

11 January 2017
17:15 EET

Trikala	0–2	Asteras Tripolis
	Report	Kaltsas 39'; Kotsiras 50'

Trikala Municipal Stadium, Trikala
Referee: Georgios Kominis (Thesprotia)
26 January 2017
17:15 EET

Asteras Tripolis	1–0	Trikala
Ioannidis 22'	Report

Theodoros Kolokotronis Stadium, Tripoli
Referee: Nikos Ratsiatos (Argolida)

Asteras Tripolis won 3–0 on aggregate.

25 January 2017
17:15 EET

Lamia	2–2	Atromitos
Avgenikou 4'; Spyropoulos 16'	Report	Dauda 2', 14'

Lamia Municipal Stadium, Lamia
Referee: Aristomenis Koutsiaftis (Arta)
1 February 2017
17:15 EET

Atromitos	2–0	Lamia
Dauda 18', 44'	Report

Peristeri Stadium, Peristeri
Referee: Nikolaos Poulimas (Corfu)

Atromitos won 4–2 on aggregate.

12 January 2017
19:30 EET

Panathinaikos	3–0	Kissamikos
Berg 49'; Leto 74', 90'	Report

Leoforos Alexandras Stadium, Ampelokipoi
Referee: Nikolaos Poulimas (Corfu)
24 January 2017
15:00 EET

Kissamikos	0–4	Panathinaikos
	Report	Klonaridis 42'; Chatzigiovanis 57'; Pispas 78'; Boumal 79'

Maleme Stadium, Maleme
Referee: Giannis Mourtzakis (Heraklion)

Panathinaikos won 7–0 on aggregate.

== Quarter-finals ==
The draw for this round took place on 27 January 2017.

=== Summary ===
Team 1	Agg.	Team 2	1st leg	2nd leg
Platanias	0–3	AEK Athens	0–0	0–3
Xanthi	2–2 (a)	PAOK	1–2	1–0
Olympiacos	2–1	Atromitos	0–0	2–1
Panathinaikos	5–0	Asteras Tripolis	4–0	1–0

=== Matches ===
9 February 2017
17:15 EET

Platanias	0–0	AEK Athens
	Report

Perivolia Municipal Stadium, Chania
Attendance: 2,000
Referee: Georgios Blanas (Messinia)
1 March 2017
19:30 EET

AEK Athens	3–0	Platanias
Christodoulopoulos 13' (pen.); Araujo 28'; Johansson 58'	Report

Olympic Stadium, Marousi
Referee: Anastasios Sidiropoulos (Dodecanese)

AEK Athens won 3–0 on aggregate.

9 February 2017
19:30 EET

Xanthi	1–2	PAOK
Lazić 52'	Report	Mystakidis 20'; Prijović 64'

Xanthi FC Arena, Xanthi
Referee: Dimitrios Karantonis (Imathia)
2 March 2017
17:15 EET

PAOK	0–1	Xanthi
	Report	Younés 64'

Toumba Stadium, Thessaloniki
Referee: Georgios Foukakis (Heraklion)

PAOK won on away goals.

8 February 2017
19:30 EET

Olympiacos	0–0	Atromitos
	Report

Karaiskakis Stadium, Piraeus
Referee: Anastasios Papapetrou (Athens)
2 March 2017
19:30 EET

Atromitos	1–2	Olympiacos
Dauda 46'	Report	Romao 63'; Fortounis 71'

Peristeri Stadium, Peristeri
Referee: Alexandros Aretopoulos (Trikala)

Olympiacos won 2–1 on aggregate.

8 February 2017
17:15 EET

Panathinaikos	4–0	Asteras Tripolis
Reis 6'; Klonaridis 32'; Villafáñez 61'; M'Poku 68' (pen.)	Report

Leoforos Alexandras Stadium, Ampelokipoi
Referee: Dimitris Styliaras (Aetoloacarnania)
1 March 2017
17:15 EET

Asteras Tripolis	0–1	Panathinaikos
	Report	Marinakis 92'

Theodoros Kolokotronis Stadium, Tripoli
Referee: Ioannis Neofytiadis (Corinthia)

Panathinaikos won 5–0 on aggregate.

== Semi-finals ==
The draw for this round took place on 21 March 2017.

=== Summary ===
Team 1	Agg.	Team 2	1st leg	2nd leg
Panathinaikos	2–4	PAOK	2–0	0–4
Olympiacos	2–2 (a)	AEK Athens	1–2	1–0

=== Matches ===
12 April 2017
19:00 EEST

Panathinaikos	2–0	PAOK
Moledo 21'; Leto 83'	Report

Leoforos Alexandras Stadium, Ampelokipoi
Referee: Anastasios Sidiropoulos (Dodecanese)
27 April 2017
19:00 EEST

PAOK	4–0	Panathinaikos
Pelkas 14'; Matos 48'; Shakhov 73'; Prijović 83'	Report

Toumba Stadium, Thessaloniki
Referee: Giorgos Kyzas (Drama)

PAOK won 4–2 on aggregate.

13 April 2017
19:30 EEST

Olympiacos	1–2	AEK Athens
Figueiras 12'	Report	Araujo 6'; Patito 64'

Georgios Karaiskakis Stadium, Piraeus
Referee: Anastasios Papapetrou (Athens)
26 April 2017
19:00 EEST

AEK Athens	0–1	Olympiacos
	Report	Romao 72'

Olympic Stadium, Marousi
Attendance: 33,512
Referee: Anastasios Sidiropoulos (Dodecanese)

AEK Athens won on away goals.

== Final ==
6 May 2017
21:00 EEST

PAOK	2–1	AEK Athens
Biseswar 24'; Henrique 81'	Report	Christodoulopoulos 26'

Panthessaliko Stadium, Volos
Attendance: 19,236
Referee: Giorgos Kominis (Thesprotia)

== Top scorers ==
Rank	Player	Club	Goals
1	(Nigeria) Abiola Dauda	Atromitos	5
2	(Argentina) Sebastian Leto	Panathinaikos	4
2	(Argentina) Sergio Araujo	AEK Athens	4
4	(Colombia) Felipe Pardo	Olympiacos	3
4	(Greece) Savvas Siatravanis	Apollon Smyrnis	3
4	(Greece) Ilias Anastasakos	Sparta	3
4	(Greece) Giorgos Bountopoulos	Sparta	3
4	(Czech Republic) Tomáš Pekhart	AEK Athens	3
4	(Serbia) Aleksandar Prijović	PAOK	3
4	(Ivory Coast) Dijilly Vouho	OFI	3
4	(Greece) Lazaros Christodoulopoulos	AEK Athens	3
4	(Sweden) Marcus Berg	Panathinaikos	3
4	(Greece) Giannis Mystakidis	PAOK	3
4	(Greece) Dimitrios Pelkas	PAOK	3
4	(Ukraine) Yevhen Shakhov	PAOK	3
