= Dimitrios Manos =

Greek footballer (born 1994)

Dimitris Manos
Personal information
- Full name: Dimitrios Manos
- Date of birth: 16 September 1994 (age 32)
- Place of birth: Trikala, Imathia, Greece
- Height: 1.81 m (5 ft 11 in)
- Position: Forward

Team information
- Current team: Giouchtas
- Number: 11

Youth career
- –2012: Veria

Senior career*
Years	Team	Apps	(Gls)
2012–2016	Veria	21	(0)
2015–2016	→ Ergotelis (loan)	14	(5)
2016–2018	OFI	53	(37)
2018–2020	Olympiacos	6	(1)
2019	→ PAS Giannina (loan)	14	(3)
2019–2020	→ OFI (loan)	29	(3)
2020–2022	Aris	54	(7)
2022–2023	Bandirmaspor	11	(2)
2023	→ Ionikos (loan)	10	(0)
2023–2024	Chania	16	(2)
2024–2025	Ilioupoli	18	(2)
2025–	Giouchtas		

International career^{‡}
2015	Greece U21	1	(0)
- * Club domestic league appearances and goals as of 15 June 2025 ‡ National team caps and goals as of 9 September 2015

Dimitrios Manos (Greek: Δημήτριος Μάνος; born 16 September 1994) is a Greek professional footballer who plays as a forward for Gamma Ethniki club Giouchtas.

== Club career ==
=== Veria ===
Manos started his professional career in Veria. His first professional contract was signed on 22 June 2012 and its set to expire on 30 June 2017. He made his debut for Veria in a 3–0 away defeat against Olympiacos on 6 January 2013.

On 7 October 2014, Manos was called up by Kostas Tsanas, the head coach of Greece national under-21 football team to join the training sessions of the team.

Manos returned to Veria on 20 January 2016 after a six months spell to Ergotelis on loan.

Manos was released on a free transfer by the club on 2 July 2016.

==== Loan to Ergotelis ====
On 31 August 2015, Manos moved on loan for a season to Ergotelis. He debuted for Ergotelis in the first round of the 2015–16 Football League in a home match against fellow Cretan club AO Chania. He then went on to score his first goal in his second appearance for the club in the next match against Acharnaikos in Menidi, scoring in the 88th minute and thus helping the club earn its first victory in the competition. Manos was released by the Cretan club before his loan ended; in January 2016 the club announced its withdrawal from professional competitions. Manos completed his loan spell as club top scorer at the time, having played in 18 matches in which he had scored 6 goals. Despite reported interest from other Football League clubs, Manos could not feature for any other clubs that season, due to a single appearance with Veria at the very start of the season. As a result, Manos returned to Veria and was made part of the club's roster.

=== OFI ===
On 1 July 2016, Manos moved for a season to OFI for an undisclosed fee. On 19 December 2016, he scored his first goal in a 2–1 away win against Kallithea. On 26 February 2017, he scored a brace in a 2–0 home win against Kissamikos. On 12 March 2017, he scored in a 3–0 away win against Panelefsiniakos. On 26 March 2017, his goal gave his team an important 1–0 home win against Kallithea. He finished the 2016–17 season with 10 goals and 5 assists. He started the 2017–18 season providing back up for the team's main striker, Nikos Kouskounas. After the departure of Kouskounas he became the first-choice striker and made an immediate impact scoring 10 goals in 8 matches. On 17 February 2018, he scored a brace in a 3–0 away win against Sparti, which restored the team to the second place of the league table, in the battle for promotion. On 3 March 2018 he scored the only goal in a home win against Anagennisi Karditsa.

Two of the teams said to have been interested in Manos’ signature were Olympiacos, who had been keeping tabs on him for quite some time and Panathinaikos who were looking for a striker due to many injured players at that position. Reports said that the greens offered OFI €100,000 in order to sign Manos in the beginning of the window. As well in the hunt were PAS Giannina and Xanthi. Just one day after these rumors Manos scored in a 3–1 away win against Kallithea and the administration of OFI expressed their desire to extend his contract. On 31 March 2018, opened the score a penalty when Nikos Boutzikos’ arm blocked a set-piece, and scored one more goal as his club made another huge step towards promotion to the Super League, defeating 3–0 nearest challengers Panachaiki. On 4 April 2018, Manos scored, opening the score in a 2–0 derby home win against rivals Aris. The Thessaloniki club came into the match protecting an unbeaten record, but Aris were swept aside by a powerful OFI. On 26 April 2018, he scored his first career hat-trick in a 7–0 home win against Panegialios, setting a new record for the club for goals scored in the season for the Cretan side. The record was previously held by Costa Rican striker Rónald Gómez, who scored 19 goals during the 1999–2000 campaign. On 5 May 2018, he scored a brace against Apollon Larissa in a 4–0 home game.

=== Olympiacos ===
In April 2018, Manos signed with Olympiacos for an initial fee of €200,000. On 27 September 2018, in his debut with the club was the only scorer with a header in a 1–0 Greek Cup home win game against Levadiakos. On 29 October 2018, Lazaros Christodoulopoulos’ surge into the box ended with his shot ricocheting fortuitously into the path of the young striker, who finished enabling his club to edge out bottom club Apollon Smyrnis 1–0 at the Karaiskakis Stadium.

==== Loan to PAS Giannina ====
On 16 January 2019, Manos was often left out of the squad by Pedro Martins during the first half of the season. To his credit, the 24-year old did manage to score two goals in nine appearances across all competitions with Olympiacos, but he has now been loaned out to PAS Giannina for the remainder of the current season. On 26 January 2019, in his debut with the club, he scored with an early sixth-minute goal, sealing a 1–0 win game against Apollon Smyrnis. On 30 March 2019, he scored an acrobatic goal from the top of the penalty area in a 2–0 away win against rivals Levadiakos in his club's effort to avoid relegation.

==== Loan to OFI ====
On 2 July 2019, Manos was not in the plans of Pedro Martins for the upcoming season, so has been loaned out to his former club OFI for the 2019–20 season. On 31 August 2019, he scored a brace, the first after an assist from Kosmas Tsilianidis, beating Sokratis Dioudis with a clinical finish and the second after an error by Portuguese defender João Nunes in a 3–1 away win against Panathinaikos.

=== Aris ===
On 12 August 2020, Manos signed a two-year contract with Aris on a free transfer. On 2 December 2020, he scored a brace in an emphatic 3–0 away win against AEL.

On 7 March 2021, he scored in a 2–2 away draw against PAOK in the traditional Derby of Thessaloniki. On 18 April 2021, Manos scored in a 2–1 away win against Panathinaikos, redeeming himself for a missed penalty earlier in the first half. On 5 May 2021, he opened the score in an eventual 1–1 home draw against Olympiacos.

== International career ==
Manos debuted for Greece U21 on 7 September 2015 in a 2–0 away win against Liechtenstein U21 as he came in replacing Savvidis at 86' minute.

== Career statistics ==
As of matches played 22 May 2022

Club	Season	League			Greek Cup		Europe		Total	
Club	Season	Division	Apps	Goals	Apps	Goals	Apps	Goals	Apps	Goals
Veria	2012–13	Super League Greece	1	0	3	0	—		4	0
Veria	2013–14	Super League Greece	16	0	2	1	—		18	1
Veria	2014–15	Super League Greece	0	0	0	0	—		0	0
Veria	2015–16	Super League Greece	4	0	0	0	—		4	0
Veria	Total		21	0	5	1	—		26	1
Ergotelis (loan)	2015–16	Super League Greece 2	14	5	4	1	—		18	6
OFI	2016–17	Super League Greece 2	27	10	3	0	—		30	10
OFI	2017–18	Super League Greece 2	26	27	3	0	—		29	27
OFI	Total		53	37	6	0	—		59	37
Olympiacos	2018–19	Super League Greece	6	1	3	1	—		9	2
PAS Giannina (loan)	2018–19	Super League Greece	14	3	1	0	—		15	3
OFI	2019–20	Super League Greece	29	3	3	0	—		32	3
Aris	2020–21	Super League Greece	35	6	4	1	1 (Note: Appearance in UEFA Europa League)	0	40	7
Aris	2021–22	Super League Greece	19	0	3	0	2 (Note: Appearances in UEFA Europa Conference League)	1	24	1
Aris	Total		54	6	7	1	3	1	64	8
Career total			191	55	29	4	3	1	223	60

== Honours ==
=== Club ===
OFI

- Football League: 2017–18

=== Individual ===
- Football League top scorer: 2017–18 (27 goals)
