= Vasilios Triantafyllakos =

Greek footballer

Personal information
- Date of birth: 16 July 1991 (age 35)
- Place of birth: Serres, Greece
- Height: 1.86 m (6 ft 1 in)
- Position: Midfielder

Team information
- Current team: Iraklis Ammoudia Serres

Youth career
- –2006: Doxa Adelfiko
- 2006–2009: Odysseas Anagennisi

Senior career*
Years	Team	Apps	(Gls)
2009–2011	Odysseas Anagennisi	74	(9)
2011–2014	Aris	44	(3)
2014–2015	Panthrakikos	1	(0)
2015	Olympiacos Volos	17	(1)
2015–2016	Lamia	4	(0)
2016	Panserraikos	15	(3)
2016–2017	Agrotikos Asteras	25	(2)
2017–2018	Sparta	26	(3)
2018–2019	Trikala	26	(5)
2019–2022	Chania	47	(6)
2022–2023	Ilioupoli	15	(6)
2023–2024	Aiolikos		
2024–	Iraklis Ammoudia Serres	0	(0)
- * Club domestic league appearances and goals as of 5 June 2023

Vasilios Triantafyllakos (Greek: Βασίλειος Τριανταφυλλάκος; born 16 July 1991) is a Greek professional footballer who plays as a midfielder for Greek Gamma Ethniki club Iraklis Ammoudia Serres.

== Career ==
=== Aris ===
Triantafyllakos made his debut for Aris as a substitute in the match against rivals, PAOK in Kleanthis Vikelidis stadium. In two consecutive matches (against Levadiakos and Skoda Xanthi) he was the best player of the team at both. He scored his first goal with Aris against Panionios in Kleanthis Vikelidis. Though he started his career as centre forward during the 2012–13 season he was established as a second striker making 19 appearances and scoring once.

== Club statistics ==
As of 25 June 2019

Club	Season	League			Cup		Other		Total	
Club	Season	Division	Apps	Goals	Apps	Goals	Apps	Goals	Apps	Goals
Aris	2011–12	Super League Greece	13	1	0	0	—		13	1
Aris	2012–13	Super League Greece	19	1	2	0	—		21	1
Aris	2013–14	Super League Greece	12	1	1	0	—		13	1
Aris	Total	Super League Greece	44	3	3	0	—		47	3
Panthrakikos	2014–15	Super League Greece	1	0	1	0	—		2	0
Olympiacos Volos	2014–15	Football League	17	1	0	0	—		17	1
Lamia	2015–16	Football League	4	0	1	0	—		5	0
Panserraikos	2015–16	Football League	15	3	0	0	—		15	3
Agrotikos Asteras	2016–17	Football League	25	2	3	1	—		28	3
Sparta	2017–18	Football League	26	3	2	0	—		28	3
Trikala	2018–19	Football League	26	5	2	0	—		28	5
Career total			158	17	12	1	0	0	170	18
