= Andreas Stamatis =

Greek footballer (born 1993)

Personal information
- Date of birth: 12 May 1993 (age 33)
- Place of birth: Athens, Greece
- Height: 1.84 m (6 ft 0 in)
- Position: Striker

Team information
- Current team: Vyzas Megara

Senior career*
Years	Team	Apps	(Gls)
2011–2012	Panionios	1	(0)
2012–2013	AEK Athens	10	(3)
2013	Paniliakos	7	(1)
2014	Iraklis Psachna	15	(0)
2014–2015	Pierikos	19	(3)
2015	Chania	6	(0)
2016	Zakynthos	11	(3)
2016–2017	Chania	32	(11)
2017–2018	Panegialios	29	(6)
2018–2019	Aris	0	(0)
2019–2021	Trikala	46	(11)
2021–2022	Karaiskakis	12	(2)
2022–2023	Apollon Larissa	19	(4)
2023	Egaleo		
2023–	Vyzas Megara		
- * Club domestic league appearances and goals as of 29 August 2023, 21:00(UTC)

Andreas Stamatis (Greek: Ανδρέας Σταματής, born 12 May 1993) is a Greek professional footballer who plays as a striker for Super League 2 club Vyzas Megara.

== Personal life ==
His father, Stavros was an international midfielder who also played for AEK Athens from 1988 to 1995. In fact the two of them are the only father-son "duo" who have both scored for AEK.

== Career statistics ==
=== Club ===
As of 8 December 2018

Club	Season	League		Cup		Continental		Other		Total	
Club	Season	Apps	Goals	Apps	Goals	Apps	Goals	Apps	Goals	Apps	Goals
Panionios	2011–12	1	0	1	0	-	-	-	-	2	0
Panionios	Total	1	0	1	0	0	0	0	0	2	0
AEK Athens	2012–13	10	3	2	0	-	-	-	-	12	3
AEK Athens	Total	10	3	2	0	0	0	0	0	12	3
Paniliakos	2013–14	7	1	1	0	-	-	-	-	8	1
Paniliakos	Total	7	1	1	0	0	0	0	0	8	1
Iraklis Psachna	2013–14	15	0	0	0	-	-	-	-	15	0
Iraklis Psachna	Total	15	0	0	0	0	0	0	0	15	0
Pierikos	2014–15	19	3	0	0	-	-	-	-	19	3
Pierikos	Total	19	3	0	0	0	0	0	0	19	3
Chania	2015–16	6	0	2	1	-	-	-	-	8	1
Chania	Total	6	0	2	1	0	0	0	0	8	1
Zakynthos	2015–16	11	3	0	0	-	-	-	-	11	3
Zakynthos	Total	11	3	0	0	0	0	0	0	11	3
Chania	2016–17	32	11	3	0	-	-	-	-	35	11
Chania	Total	32	11	3	0	0	0	0	0	35	11
Panegialios	2017–18	29	6	3	0	-	-	-	-	32	6
Panegialios	Total	29	6	3	0	0	0	0	0	32	6
Aris	2018–19	0	0	0	0	-	-	-	-	0	0
Aris	Total	0	0	0	0	0	0	0	0	0	0
Career total		130	27	12	1	0	0	0	0	142	28
