= 2018–19 Football League (Greece) =

Football League
- Season: 2018–19
- Dates: 27 October 2018 – 5 May 2019
- Champions: Volos (1st title)
- Promoted: Volos
- Relegated: Irodotos; Aittitos Spata; Aiginiakos; Sparti
- Matches: 240
- Goals: 547 (2.28 per match)
- Top goalscorer: Christos Eleftheriadis; Miguel Bianconi (16 goals)
- Biggest home win: Volos 7–0 Karaiskakis (27 October 2018); Platanias 7–0 Sparti (27 March 2019)
- Biggest away win: Sparti 0–7 Doxa Drama (13 April 2019)
- Highest scoring: Volos 7–0 Karaiskakis (27 October 2018); Iraklis 3–4 Apollon Larissa (22 November 2018); Platanias 7–0 Sparti (27 March 2019); Sparti 0–7 Doxa Drama (13 April 2019); Platanias 4–3 Panachaiki (17 April 2019)
- Longest winning run: 6 matches Volos
- Longest unbeaten run: 12 matches Volos
- Longest winless run: 11 matches Aittitos Spata
- Longest losing run: 9 matches Aittitos Spata
- All statistics correct as of 5 May 2019.

The 2018–19 Football League is the second division of the Greek professional football league system and the eighth season under the name Football League after previously being known as Beta Ethniki. This year the participating teams were reduced from 18 to 16.

== Team changes ==
The following teams have changed division since the 2017–18 season.

=== To Football League ===
Promoted from Gamma Ethniki

- Aittitos Spata
- Iraklis
- Irodotos
- Volos

Relegated from Super League

- Kerkyra
- Platanias

==== From Football League ====
Promoted to Super League

- OFI
- Aris

Relegated to Gamma Ethniki

- Acharnaikos
- Anagennisi Karditsa
- Kallithea
- Panegialios
- Panserraikos
- Veria

== Stadiums ==
Locations of the 2018–19 Football League teams

Team	Location	Stadium	Capacity
Aiginiakos	Aiginio	Municipal Stadium "Giannis Paralikidis"	1,000
~~Aittitos Spata~~^{1}	~~Spata~~	~~Spata Municipal Stadium~~	~~2,500~~
AO Chania−Kissamikos	Chania	Perivolia Municipal Stadium	4,527
Apollon Larissa	Larissa	Apollon Ground	5,000
Apollon Pontus	Thessaloniki	Kalamaria Stadium	6,500
Doxa Drama	Drama	Doxa Drama Stadium	9,000
Ergotelis	Heraklion	Pankritio Stadium	26,240
Iraklis	Thessaloniki	Kaftanzoglio Stadium	27,770
Irodotos	Heraklion	Municipal Nea Alikarnassos Stadium	3,000
Karaiskakis	Arta	Municipal Agioi Anargiroi Stadium	1,900
Kerkyra	Corfu	Kerkyra Stadium	3,000
Panachaiki	Patras	Kostas Davourlis Stadium	11,321
Platanias	Chania	Perivolia Municipal Stadium	4,527
Sparti	Sparta	Sparta Municipal Stadium	1,500
Trikala	Trikala	Trikala Municipal Stadium	15,000
Volos	Volos	Neapoli Municipal Stadium	2,500

- ^{1} Aittitos Spata was expelled during the season

== Personnel and sponsoring ==
Team	Manager	Captain	Kit manufacturer	Sponsor
Aiginiakos	(Turkey) Cem Karaca	(Greece) Stefanos Polyzos	Givova	N/A
~~Aittitos Spata~~	~~(Greece) Petros Dimitriou~~	~~(Greece) Andreas Iraklis~~	~~Givova~~	~~N/A~~
AO Chania−Kissamikos	(Greece) Alekos Vosniadis	(Greece) Alexis Seliniotakis	Saller	Dimiourgiki
Apollon Larissa	(Albania) Arjan Bellaj	(Greece) Konstantinos Chatzis	Givova	N/A
Apollon Pontus	(Greece) Dimitris Kalaitzidis	(Greece) Dimitris Samaras	Nike	N/A
Doxa Drama	(Greece) Dimitrios Spanos	(Greece) Stavros Petavrakis	Macron	N/A
Ergotelis	(Cyprus) Nikki Papavasiliou	(Greece) Christos Batzios	Capelli	N/A
Iraklis	(Brazil) Marcello Troisi	(Greece) Nikos Ziabaris	Givova	N/A
Irodotos	(Greece) Georgios Lyronis	(Greece) Michail Fragoulakis	Stanno	Chalet Suites
Karaiskakis	(Greece) Apostolos Charalampidis	(Greece) Aristotelis Karagiannidis	Macron	Kotopoula Artas
Kerkyra	(Greece) Anastasios Theos	(Greece) Giannis Ioannou	Macron	N/A
Panachaiki	(Greece) Sakis Tsiolis	(Greece) Nikos Loumpardeas	Capelli	Bakalaros
Platanias	(Greece) Giannis Tatsis	(Greece) Manolis Roussakis	Luanvi	Ergobeton
Sparti	(Greece) Konstantinos Kladis	(Greece) Thanasis Pantos	Givova	Mayfair
Trikala	(Greece) Dimitrios Sitsas	(Greece) Xenofon Panos	Nike	Goalbet
Volos	(Spain) Juan Ferrando	(Greece) Vasilios Mantzis	Luanvi	Goalbet

== League table ==
Pos	Team	Pld	W	D	L	GF	GA	GD	Pts	Promotion or relegation
1	Volos (C)	30	18	6	6	61	27	+34	60	Promotion to the Super League 1
2	Platanias	30	15	10	5	53	22	+31	55	Qualification for the promotion play-off
3	Apollon Larissa (Note: Apollon Larissa were deducted three points for failing to pass the economic oversight process of the HFF.)	30	16	9	5	44	27	+17	54	Eligibility for Super League 2
4	Ergotelis (Note: Ergotelis were deducted three points for failing to pass the economic oversight process of the HFF.)	30	15	6	9	48	28	+20	48	Eligibility for Super League 2
5	Panachaiki	30	12	12	6	32	25	+7	48	Eligibility for Super League 2
6	Chania	30	13	7	10	40	24	+16	46	Eligibility for Super League 2
7	Apollon Pontus (Note: Apollon Pontus were deducted three points for failing to pass the economic oversight process of the HFF.)	30	15	4	11	33	27	+6	46	Eligibility for Super League 2
8	Doxa Drama	30	12	9	9	41	28	+13	45	Eligibility for Super League 2
9	Kerkyra (Note: Kerkyra were deducted three points for failing to pass the economic oversight process of the HFF.)	30	14	5	11	30	25	+5	44	Eligibility for Super League 2
10	Karaiskakis	30	11	7	12	24	28	−4	40	Eligibility for Super League 2
11	Iraklis (Note: Iraklis Thessaloniki were deducted three points for failing to pass the economic oversight process of the HFF. The team decided to withdraw for financial reasons, and played in the Third Macedonian FCA Championship for the 2019–20 season. The team returned to Gamma Ethniki for the 2020–21 season by merging for one year with Iraklis Ampelokipi.) (R)	30	11	9	10	29	24	+5	39	Withdrew
12	Trikala (R)	30	9	8	13	27	30	−3	35	Relegation to Football League
13	Irodotos (Note: Irodotos were deducted three points for failing to pass the economic oversight process of the HFF.) (R)	30	9	4	17	24	50	−26	28	Relegation to Gamma Ethniki
14	~~Aittitos Spata~~ (Note: Aittitos Spata was expelled during the season.) (R)	30	5	7	18	18	50	−32	22	Relegation to Gamma Ethniki
15	Aiginiakos (Note: Aiginiakos were deducted three points for failing to pass the economic oversight process of the HFF.) (R)	30	5	4	21	24	66	−42	16	Relegation to Gamma Ethniki
16	~~Sparti~~ (Note: Sparti were deducted twelve points. Three points for fielding 6 foreign players at once during Matchday 18 vs. Ergotelis (awarded the match 3–0) and six points for not showing up at two games and three for failing to pass the economic oversight process of the HFF.) (R)	30	4	5	21	17	64	−47	11	Relegation to Gamma Ethniki

Source: Football League
Rules for classification: 1) Points; 2) Head-to-head points; 3) Head-to-head goal difference; 4) Goals scored; 5) Goals against; 6) Play-offs (neutral ground, only used if needed to decide teams for promotion or relegation).
(C) Champions; (R) Relegated

== Results ==
Home \ Away	AIG	AIT	CHA	APL	APP	DOX	ERG	IRA	IRO	KAR	KER	PCH	PLA	SPA	TRI	VOL
Aiginiakos		1–2	0–4	0–4	2–2	1–3	2–0	1–0	0–1	1–2	0–1	0–0	0–5	3–0 (Note: The opponents of Sparti awarded a 3–0 w/o win each.)	2–1	1–4
Aittitos Spata	1–0		0–1	2–2	0–3 (Note: The opponents of Aittitos Spata awarded a 3–0 w/o win each.)	2–0	0–3	0–3	1–1	0–3	0–0	1–1	0–0	0–0	1–1	0–3
AO Chania−Kissamikos	2–3	3–0		1–1	1–0	0–1	1–2	0–1	2–0	1–0	1–0	0–0	2–2	4–1	1–0	1–2
Apollon Larissa	3–2	2–0	0–3		3–1	0–0	2–2	1–0	1–1	0–1	2–0	1–0	1–0	1–1	3–1	1–1
Apollon Pontus	1–0	0–1	1–3	1–0		0–0	3–0	0–1	3–0	2–1	0–2	0–0	0–1	1–0	1–0	1–0
Doxa Drama	2–0	3–0	1–0	2–0	4–0		0–2	2–0	2–3	2–0	0–1	1–1	2–2	2–0	1–2	0–3 (Note: The game awarded a 3–0 w/o win to Volos)
Ergotelis	4–1	3–1	1–0	1–2	2–0	2–0		1–1	4–1	1–1	1–2	2–1	2–2	3–0 (Note: The game awarded a 3–0 w/o win to Ergotelis.)	3–0	2–0
Iraklis	1–1	2–1	0–0	3–4	0–2	0–0	2–1		1–0	0–1	1–1	0–0	2–2	3–0	1–0	2–0
Irodotos	4–2	1–0	2–1	0–1	0–1	0–0	1–0	1–1		2–0	0–2	0–1	0–4	4–1	1–0	0–2
Karaiskakis	4–0	1–0	0–0	0–1	0–2	0–0	1–0	1–0	1–0		1–1	0–1	0–1	0–0	1–3	0–1
Kerkyra	1–0	0–2	1–0	1–2	0–2	3–0	2–1	1–0	2–0	0–1		0–2	1–0	3–0	1–1	1–1
Panachaiki	2–2	2–1	1–3	1–0	1–1	2–2	0–1	1–0	2–0	0–0	1–0		1–0	1–0	2–1	1–1
Platanias	3–0	2–1	0–0	0–0	3–1	0–0	1–0	2–1	5–1	2–0	2–0	4–3		7–0	2–0	0–0
Sparti	1–0	3–0	1–1	0–2	0–3	0–7	0–2	0–1	3–0	0–4	1–2	2–3	0–0		2–0	1–3
Trikala	2–0	3–0	2–0	1–1	0–1	2–3	1–1	0–0	2–0	0–0	1–0	0–0	1–0	1–0		0–1
Volos	6–0	3–1	1–4	1–3	2–0	2–1	1–1	0–2	5–0	7–0	2–1	2–1	3–1	3–0	1–1	

Source: Football League
Legend: Blue = home team win; Yellow = draw; Red = away team win.

== Top scorers ==
As of 5 May 2019

Rank	Player	Club	Goals
1	(Greece) Christos Eleftheriadis	Panachaiki	16
1	(Brazil) Miguel Bianconi	Platanias	16
3	(Greece) Vasilios Mantzis	Volos	14
4	(Greece) Nikos Kouskounas	Doxa Drama/AO Chania−Kissamikos	11
4	(United States) Joseph Efford	Ergotelis	11
6	(Greece) Giannis Loukinas	Platanias	10
7	(Argentina) Emanuel Perrone	Iraklis	9
7	(Greece) Anastasios Kritikos	Doxa Drama	9
9	(Greece) Michalis Fragos	Volos	8
9	(Greece) Konstantinos Iliopoulos	Volos	8
9	(Greece) Konstantinos Chatzis	Apollon Larissa	8
9	(Brazil) Lucão	Apollon Larissa	8
9	(Greece) Christos Tzioras	Karaiskakis	8
9	(Greece) Konstantinos Doumtsios	Doxa Drama	8
9	(Spain) Nili	Platanias	8
