= 2016–17 Football League (Greece) =

Football League
- Season: 2016–17
- Dates: 30 October 2016 – 11 June 2017
- Champions: Apollon Smyrnis
- Promoted: Lamia
- Relegated: Agrotikos Asteras; Panelefsiniakos; AEL Kalloni; Panthrakikos

The 2016–17 Football League was the second division of the Greek professional football system and the seventh season under the name Football League after previously being known as Beta Ethniki. Its season began on 30 October 2016 and concluded on 11 June 2017.

== Teams ==
Location of teams in 2016-17 Football League

Team	Location	Stadium	Capacity	Last season
Acharnaikos	Acharnes	Acharnes Stadium	4,450	FL, 9th
~~AEL Kalloni~~^{1}	~~Mytilene~~	~~Mytilene Municipal Stadium~~	~~3,000~~	~~SL, 16th~~
Agrotikos Asteras	Evosmos	Agrotikos Asteras Ground	2,267	FL, 11th
Aiginiakos	Aiginio	Municipal Stadium of Aiginio	2,000	Gamma Ethniki, Group 2, 1st
Anagennisi Karditsa	Karditsa	Karditsa Stadium	9,500	FL, 8th
AO Chania	Chania	Perivolia Municipal Stadium	2,800	FL, 12th
Apollon Smyrnis	Athens	Georgios Kamaras Stadium	14,856	FL, 4th
Aris	Thessaloniki	Kleanthis Vikelidis Stadium	22,800	Gamma Ethniki, Group 1, 1st
Kallithea	Kallithea	Grigoris Lambrakis Stadium	4,250	FL, 7th
Kissamikos	Kissamos	Maleme Stadium	700	FL, 6th
Lamia	Lamia	Lamia Stadium	6,000	FL, 5th
OFI	Heraklion	Theodoros Vardinogiannis Stadium	8,500	Gamma Ethniki, Group 4, 1st
Panegialios	Aigio	Aigio Stadium	4,500	FL, 13th
Panelefsiniakos	Eleusina	Municipal Stadium of Eleusina	2,100	FL, 14th
Panserraikos	Serres	Serres Municipal Stadium	9,500	FL, 10th
~~Panthrakikos~~^{2}	~~Komotini~~	~~Komotini Municipal Stadium~~	~~6,200~~	~~SL, 15th~~
Sparta	Sparta	Sparta Municipal Stadium	1,500	Gamma Ethniki, Group 3, 1st
Trikala	Trikala	Trikala Municipal Stadium	15,000	FL, 3rd

- ^{1} AEL Kalloni was expelled during the season
- ^{2} Panthrakikos withdrew during the season

== Structure ==
There are eighteen clubs that compete in the Football League, playing each other in a home and away series. At the end of the season, the bottom four teams are relegated to Gamma Ethniki. The top two teams gain automatic promotion for Super League. All teams in the Football League take part in the Greek Football Cup.

== League table ==
Pos	Team	Pld	W	D	L	GF	GA	GD	Pts	Promotion or relegation
1	Apollon Smyrnis (C, P)	34	25	8	1	61	14	+47	83	Promotion to Super League
2	Lamia (P)	34	25	5	4	55	11	+44	80	Promotion to Super League
3	Aris	34	23	8	3	58	17	+41	77	
4	OFI	34	22	6	6	68	20	+48	72	
5	Trikala	34	22	5	7	65	19	+46	71	
6	Agrotikos Asteras (R)	34	16	4	14	49	35	+14	52	Relegation to FCA Championships (Note: Panelefsiniakos, AEL Kalloni, Chania and Panthrakikos were all relegated to Gamma Ethniki initially, but decided to withdraw before the league started because of financial problems, ultimately starting next season in the respective local FCA Championships.)
7	Sparta	34	12	9	13	38	42	−4	45	
8	Panserraikos	34	12	8	14	38	44	−6	44	
9	Panegialios	34	11	11	12	33	28	+5	44	
10	Aiginiakos	34	11	8	15	44	52	−8	41	
11	Kissamikos (Note: At the end of the season, Kissamikos merged with AO Chania and formed AO Chania — Kissamikos, continuing in the same division.)	34	11	7	16	29	38	−9	40	Merged
12	Anagennisi Karditsa	34	10	9	15	26	38	−12	39	
13	Acharnaikos (Note: Acharnaikos deducted 2 points.)	34	11	5	18	38	51	−13	36	
14	Kallithea	34	9	6	19	42	49	−7	33	
15	Panelefsiniakos (R)	34	6	10	18	21	56	−35	28	Relegation to FCA Championships
16	AEL Kalloni (Note: Kalloni were expelled from the league at 24 May 2017 and they were deducted 12 points.) (R)	34	4	7	23	21	75	−54	7	Relegation to FCA Championships
17	AO Chania (Note: AO Chania deducted 33 points from Hellenic Football Federation because playing games without a certificate of participation. At the end of the season, Chania merged with Kissamikos and formed AO Chania — Kissamikos, continuing in the same division.)	34	11	5	18	37	60	−23	5	
18	Panthrakikos (Note: Panthrakikos withdrew from the league at 26 January 2017 and they were deducted 18 points.) (R)	34	3	3	28	7	81	−74	−6	Relegation to FCA Championships

Source: Football League and footballleaguenews.gr
Rules for classification: 1) Points; 2) Head-to-head points; 3) Head-to-head goal difference; 4) Goals scored; 5) Goals against; 6) Play-offs (neutral ground, only used if needed to decide teams for promotion or relegation).
(C) Champions; (P) Promoted; (R) Relegated

=== Matches ===
Home \ Away	ACH	KAL	AGR	EGN	KRD	CHA	APS	ARI	KLT	KIS	LAM	OFI	PEG	PNF	PSE	PTH	SPA	TRI
Acharnaikos		3–0	2–1	3–1	1–1	1–2	0–2	1–2	3–1	0–1	0–3	2–3	0–0	0–0	2–1	3–0^{1}	1–2	0–1
AEL Kalloni	2–1		1–0	1–3	0–0	0–1	1–4	0–1	2–0	1–1	0–2	1–2	0–3^{2}	1–3	0–3^{2}	1–1	0–0	0–2
Agrotikos Asteras	0–1	3–0^{2}		1–0	3–0	2–0	0–1	1–1	5–3	4–0	0–1	2–1	1–1	0–0	2–0	3–0^{1}	3–0	3–1
Aiginiakos	3–1	0–0	2–0		0–3	5–1	1–2	0–1	1–2	2–0	0–0	0–1	1–1	0–0	0–0	2–1	1–0	2–2
Anagennisi Karditsa	2–0	1–0	2–0	2–1		2–0	0–0	1–1	1–0	0–1	0–2	0–2	1–1	0–0	2–1	3–0^{1}	0–2	0–2
AO Chania	2–3	4–0	0–2	3–2	2–1		1–4	0–2	1–3	1–1	0–3	0–2	1–0	0–0	0–1	3–0^{1}	2–2	1–0
Apollon Smyrnis	3–1	4–0	0–0	4–1	2–0	3–0		2–2	3–2	1–0	1–0	0–0	2–0	3–0	1–0	3–0^{1}	1–0	0–0
Aris	2–0	5–0	2–0	1–1	3–0	2–1	1–0		3–0	1–0	0–0	1–0	2–1	4–0	4–0	3–0^{1}	2–1	3–2
Kallithea	1–1	4–1	1–2	0–1	2–2	3–1	1–2	2–0		2–0	0–1	1–2	1–0	0–0	0–1	3–0^{1}	2–2	0–1
Kissamikos	1–0	4–1	2–0	1–0	2–1	0–0	0–1	0–1	1–0		1–2	1–1	2–1	1–1	1–1	3–0^{1}	2–1	1–3
Lamia	3–0	4–0	2–1	2–1	0–1	2–1	0–0	1–0	1–0	2–0		1–1	1–0	4–0	3–1	3–0^{1}	2–0	1–0
OFI	3–0	2–2	4–0	6–1	5–0	3–0	1–1	1–1	1–0	2–0	1–2		1–0	2–0	2–0	3–0^{1}	6–1	0–1
Panegialios	0–0	2–0	1–0	1–1	1–0	0–0	0–0	0–1	2–0	1–0	1–0	0–3		4–0	1–1	3–0	2–4	1–0
Panelefsiniakos	1–3	3–1	0–6	0–1	1–0	1–3	1–3	1–3	1–3	2–1	0–0	0–3	0–0		0–1	3–0^{1}	1–1	1–0
Panserraikos	1–0	3–1	2–1	4–5	0–0	1–2	1–2	0–0	1–1	1–0	0–3	0–1	4–2	2–1		0–0	3–0^{3}	0–3
Panthrakikos	0–3^{1}	0–3^{1}	0–1	0–3^{1}	0–0	0–2	0–3^{1}	0–3^{1}	2–1	1–0	0–3^{1}	0–3^{1}	0–3^{1}	1–0	0–3^{1}		0–3^{1}	0–3^{1}
Sparta	1–2	1–1	1–2	3–2	1–0	3–1	0–2	0–0	2–1	0–0	0–1	1–0	0–0	1–0	3–0	2–1		0–0
Trikala	5–0	5–0	3–0	5–0	2–0	6–1	0–1	1–0	2–2	3–1	1–0	1–0	1–0	4–0	1–1	3–0	1–0	

Source: (in Greek)
Legend: Blue = home team win; Yellow = draw; Red = away team win.
- ^{1} The opponents of Panthrakikos awarded a 3–0 w/o win each.
- ^{2} The opponents of Kalloni awarded a 3–0 w/o win each.
- ^{3} Sparta did not show up to the match, so Panserraikos awarded a 3–0 w/o win.

=== Top scorers ===
Rank	Player	Club	Goals
1	(Greece) Nikos Kouskounas	Trikala	20
2	(Greece) Nikos Giannitsanis	Trikala	15
2	(Ivory Coast) Patrick Vouho	OFI	15
3	(Greece) Andreas Vasilogiannis	Lamia	12
4	(Greece) Andreas Stamatis	Chania	11
5	(Greece) Savvas Siatravanis	Apollon Smyrnis	10
5	(Greece) Stelios Kritikos	Panegialios	10
5	(Greece) Michalis Fragos	Kalloni / Sparta	10
5	(Greece) Dimitrios Manos	OFI	10
