= Nikos Kouskounas =

Greek footballer (born 1988)

Personal information
- Full name: Nikolaos Kouskounas
- Date of birth: 23 December 1988 (age 37)
- Place of birth: Argos, Greece
- Height: 1.80 m (5 ft 11 in)
- Position: Forward

Youth career
- –2007: Olympiacos Loutraki

Senior career*
Years	Team	Apps	(Gls)
2007–2008	Asteras Tripolis	2	(0)
2008	Fostiras	17	(5)
2008–2011	Panachaiki	23	(1)
2009	→ Panegialios (loan)	13	(6)
2009	→ Keravnos Keratea (loan)	12	(5)
2011	→ Aias Salaminas (loan)	0	(0)
2011–2012	Atromitos Chiliomodi	30	(26)
2012–2013	Mandraikos	23	(19)
2013–2015	Panelefsiniakos	58	(38)
2015–2017	Trikala	60	(38)
2017	OFI	7	(3)
2018	Doxa Drama	29	(20)
2019–2020	Chania	30	(11)
2020–2021	Panachaiki	20	(6)
2021–2022	Trikala	11	(4)
2022	Niki Volos	17	(2)
2022–2023	Trikala	20	(10)
2023–2024	Fiki		
2024–2025	Atromitos Palamas		
- * Club domestic league appearances and goals as of 24 July 2023

Nikos Kouskounas (Greek: Νίκος Κουσκουνάς; born 23 December 1988) is a Greek professional footballer who plays as a forward.

== Career ==
Kouskounas started his career at Olympiacos Loutraki. On 1 January 2007, he moved to Asteras Tripolis. At the end of the season he celebrated promotion to the Super League. After not being able to establish himself into the starting line-up he left the club and joined Fostiras. During the next seven seasons he switched seven different clubs.

=== Trikala ===
On 26 August 2015, Trikala announced the signing of Kouskounas on a one-year contract. He finished the season with 29 appearances and 18 goals, winning the golden boot of the Football League. At the end of the season he renewed his contract for an additional year. He started the 2016–17 season with just 1 goal in 5 games. Soon after he found his form scoring 5 goals in the next 9 matches. On 8 March 2017, he scored the first hat-trick of his career in a 3–1 home win against Kissamikos. Four days later he scored another hat-trick in a 5–0 home win against Acharnaikos. On 9 April 2017, he scored what proved to be the only goal in a home win against Sparta. On 7 May 2017, he scored a brace against Aiginiakos, setting a new record for the club, with a streak of 13 consecutive wins. On 28 May 2017, he scored another one in a 6–1 home win against Chania. He finished the season with 20 goals, winning the golden boot for the second season in a row. Along with teammate, Nikos Giannitsanis they composed one of the most effective duos in the history of the division with a combined tally of 35 goals and 9 assists.

=== OFI ===
On 28 June 2017, the two-time Football League top-scorer joined OFI. On 25 November 2017, he scored his first goal for the club in a 2–1 home win against Kallithea. On 4 December 2017, he scored in a 4–2 Cretan derby away win against Ergotelis. On 31 December 2017, he terminated his contract, due to the club's financial problems.

=== Doxa Drama ===
On 4 January 2018, Doxa Drama announced the signing of Kouskounas. On 21 January 2018, he scored his first goal for the club in a disappointing 2–2 home draw against Apollon Larissa. On 3 February 2018, he sealed a 2–0 away win against Veria. On 18 February 2018, he was the MVP of a 3–1 home win against Panserraikos, scoring one goal and giving one assist. One week later he scored the only goal in a 1–0 away win against Anagennisi Karditsa. On 4 March 2018 he scored in an unexpected 3–3 home draw against Aiginiakos. On 11 March 2018 he opened the score in a 2–0 home win against Kallithea. On 15 April 2018, he scored in a 1–1 home draw against OFI, but he didn't celebrate out of respect for his old club. On 25 April 2018 he scored in a 3–1 home win against Apollon Pontus. Four days later he scored in a 3–1 away win against Apollon Larissa. On 20 May 2018 he scored five goals in an 7–0 home win against Sparti.

On 19 July 2018, he signed a one-year contract extension. On 4 November 2018, he scored his first goal for the 2018–19 season, sealing a 2–1 home win against Volos. On 17 November 2018, he opened the score in a 3–2 home loss against Irodotos. On 25 November 2018, he sealed a 3–1 away win against Aiginiakos. On 2 December 2018, he scored the equalizer in a 1–1 home draw against Panachaiki. On 15 December 2018, he scored in an 2–0 home win against Iraklis.

=== Chania ===
On 10 January 2019 he signed a contract with Football League side AO Chania Kissamikos on a free transfer. On 19 January 2019, in his second appearance with the club, he scored his first goal in a 1–0 home win against Karaiskakis. On 3 February 2019, he capitalized an error from the goalkeeper to give his team a 1–0 home win, in the battle to avoid relegation. A week later Nikos scored a brace in a 4–1 home win against Sparti. On 2 March 2019, he scored in an 4–1 away win against Volos. On 5 May 2019, on the last matchday of the season, Nikos returned after a four-match suspension, and scored in a 3–1 away win against Apollon Pontus.

In the first match of the 2019–20 season, he scored a brace helping to a 4–0 away win against Apollon Pontus.

== Career statistics ==
As of 8 August 2023

Appearances and goals by club, season and competition
Club	Season	League			Cup		Continental		Other		Total	
Club	Season	Division	Apps	Goals	Apps	Goals	Apps	Goals	Apps	Goals	Apps	Goals
Trikala	2015–16	Super League Greece 2	29	18	2	0	—		—		31	18
Trikala	2016–17	Super League Greece 2	31	20	5	2	—		—		36	22
Trikala	Total		60	38	7	2	0	0	0	0	67	40
OFI	2017–18	Super League Greece 2	7	3	1	0	—		—		8	3
Doxa Drama	2017–18	Super League Greece 2	20	15	0	0	—		—		20	15
Doxa Drama	2018–19	Super League Greece 2	9	5	1	0	—		—		10	5
Doxa Drama	Total		29	20	1	0	0	0	0	0	30	20
Chania	2018–19	Super League Greece 2	12	6	0	0	—		—		12	6
Chania	2019–20	Super League Greece 2	18	5	1	0	—		—		19	5
Chania	Total		30	11	1	0	0	0	0	0	31	11
Panachaiki	2020–21	Super League Greece 2	20	6	0	0	—		—		20	6
Trikala	2021–22	Super League Greece 2	11	4	3	1	—		—		14	5
Niki Volos	2021–22	Super League Greece 2	17	2	—		—		—		17	2
Trikala	2022–23	Gamma Ethniki	20	10	0	0	—		—		20	10
Career total			194	94	13	3	0	0	0	0	207	97
