= Manolis Bolakis =

Greek footballer (born 1994)

Personal information
- Full name: Emmanouil Bolakis
- Date of birth: 20 October 1994 (age 32)
- Place of birth: Heraklion, Crete, Greece
- Height: 1.79 m (5 ft 10 in)
- Position: Right-back

Team information
- Current team: Kissavos Sykoriou

Youth career
- OFI

Senior career*
Years	Team	Apps	(Gls)
2014–2020	OFI	38	(0)
2017	→ Kissamikos (loan)	1	(0)
2020–2021	Doxa Dramas	15	(0)
2021–2022	Irodotos	3	(0)
2022	Atsalenios		
2022-2023	Trikala		
2023-	Kissavos Sykoriou		

International career
2015	Greece U21	1	(0)
- * Club domestic league appearances and goals as of 30 October 2025

Manolis Bolakis (Greek: Μανώλης Μπολάκης; born 20 October 1994) is a Greek professional footballer who plays as a full-back.

== Honours ==
OFI

- Football League: 2017–18
