= Georgios Bountopoulos =

Greek footballer (born 1990)

Personal information
- Full name: Georgios Bountopoulos
- Date of birth: 27 July 1990 (age 36)
- Place of birth: Pyrgos, Greece
- Height: 1.72 m (5 ft 7 1/2 in)
- Position: Right winger

Team information
- Current team: Aris Voula

Youth career
- 2009–2010: Levadiakos U20

Senior career*
| Years | Team | Apps | (Gls) |
| 2010–2014 | Levadiakos | 3 | (0) |
| 2013–2014 | → AO Chania (loan) | 24 | (1) |
| 2014–2015 | Paniliakos | 6 | (1) |
| 2015 | Panachaiki | 20 | (3) |
| 2015–2016 | AEL | 15 | (2) |
| 2016 | Apollon Smyrnis | 6 | (0) |
| 2016–2017 | Sparta | 23 | (4) |
| 2017 | Trikala | 6 | (0) |
| 2018 | Asteras Amaliada | 10 | (3) |
| 2018–2019 | Panargiakos | | |
| 2019–2020 | Rodos | | |
| 2020–2021 | Santorini | 15 | (1) |
| 2021–2022 | P.A.O. Rouf | | |
| 2022 | Ypato | | |
| 2022–2023 | Vyzas | | |
| 2023–2024 | Keratea | | |
| 2024–2025 | Acharnaikos | | |
| 2025–2026 | Thyella Agios Dimitrios | | |
| 2026 | Apollon Smyrnis | | |
| 2026– | Aris Voula | | |
- * Club domestic league appearances and goals as of 21:00, 26 June 2021 (UTC)

Georgios Bountopoulos (Greek: Γεώργιος Μπουντόπουλος; born 27 July 1990) is a Greek professional footballer who plays as a winger for Aris Voula.

== Career ==
He started his career from the youth team of Levadiakos in 2009. A year later he signed a professional contract and moved to the first squad, where he managed to play only in 3 games in the Super League. Thus, in the season 2013-14 he was given on loan to the Cretan Second Division club AO Chania where he had a full season with 24 league games. In the season 2014–15, Bountopoulos signed with Paniliakos, in the Greek Football League. After the dissolution of the team due to major financial problems, he moved on 1 January 2015 to Panachaiki. On 23 of July 2015, he moved to AEL and signed a 3-years contract. On 31 January 2016, he solved his contract with the club by mutual agreement. He spent the 2016–2017 season to Sparti, recording 27 appearances with 7 goals and 5 assists. Due to the club's financial problems he left in search of another team. On 12 July 2017 he joined Trikala on a one-year contract.
