= Konstantinos Kladis =

Greek footballer

Personal information
- Date of birth: 30 April 1958 (age 68)

Team information
- Current team: Nea Artaki (manager)

Managerial career
- Years: Team
- 2015: Kalamata
- 2017: Sparta (caretaker)
- 2018: Asteras Amaliada
- 2019: Acharnaikos
- 2019–: Nea Artaki

Konstantinos Kladis (Greek: Κωνσταντίνος Κλάδης; born 30 April 1958) is a Greek football manager.
