= Petros Dimitriou =

Greek footballer

Personal information
- Date of birth: 22 December 1957 (age 68)
- Place of birth: Athens, Greece

Managerial career
- Years: Team
- 2006–2007: Ilioupoli
- 2007–2008: Vyzas
- 2008: Ilioupoli
- 2008: Vyzas
- 2008: Agios Dimitrios
- 2008–2009: Ilioupoli
- 2009–2010: Panegialios
- 2010: Keravnos Keratea
- 2011–2012: Ethnikos Asteras
- 2012: Proodeftiki
- 2012: Ethnikos Asteras
- 2012–2013: Fokikos
- 2013: Paniliakos
- 2014: Vyzas
- 2014: Pefki
- 2014–2015: Alimos
- 2015–2016: Chalkida
- 2016–2017: Apollon Smyrnis (team manager)
- 2017: Acharnaikos
- 2018: Panegialios
- 2018–2019: Aittitos Spata
- 2019: Egaleo
- 2020: Panachaiki
- 2020–2021: Ilioupoli
- 2022: Ethnikos Piraeus
- 2023: Moschato
- 2023: Atromitos Piraeus
- 2025: Thiva
- 2026: Acharnaikos

Petros Dimitriou (Greek: Πέτρος Δημητρίου; born 22 December 1957) is a Greek professional football manager.
