= Sotiris Pispas =

Greek footballer

Personal information
- Full name: Sotirios Panteleimon Pispas
- Date of birth: 1 August 1998 (age 28)
- Place of birth: Athens, Greece
- Height: 1.77 m (5 ft 10 in)
- Position: Striker

Youth career
- Fivos Varis
- 2008–2017: Panathinaikos

Senior career*
Years	Team	Apps	(Gls)
2017–2018	Panathinaikos	9	(0)
2018–2019	Volos	18	(3)
2019–2020	Episkopi	15	(8)
2020–2021	Xanthi	0	(0)
2020–2021	→ Panionios (loan)	12	(4)
2021–2022	Diagoras	9	(0)
2022–2023	Panionios	32	(14)
2023–2024	Aris Petroupolis		
2024	Panegialios		
2024–2025	P.A.O. Rouf		

International career
2014	Greece U16	2	(0)
2014	Greece U17	4	(0)
- * Club domestic league appearances and goals

Sotiris Pispas (Greek: Σωτήρης Πίσπας; born 1 August 1998) is a Greek former professional footballer who played as a striker.

== Career ==
He plays mainly as a forward, and joined Panathinaikos from the youth ranks of Panathinaikos in the winter of 2017.

== Honours ==
Volos

- Football League: 2018–19
