= Michalandreas Nyktaris =

Greek footballer

Personal information
- Date of birth: 30 December 1999 (age 26)
- Place of birth: Rethymno, Crete, Greece
- Height: 1.79 m (5 ft 10 in)
- Position: Midfielder

Youth career
- 2013–2015: OFI
- 2015–2016: Chania
- 2016–2017: Karmiotissa
- 2017: Veria

Senior career*
Years	Team	Apps	(Gls)
2015–2016	Chania	11	(0)
2016–2017	Karmiotissa	0	(0)
2017–2018	Veria	4	(0)
2018–2019	Nestos Chrysoupoli	13	(3)
2019	Irodotos	18	(1)
2019–2021	Apollon Larissa	23	(0)
2021–	Apollon Pontus	6	(0)
- * Club domestic league appearances and goals as of 28 April 2021

Michalandreas Nyktaris (Greek: Μιχαλανδρέας Νύκταρης; born 30 December 1999) is a Greek professional footballer who plays as a midfielder.
