= Theaghenis Dionysatos =

Greek football defensive midfielder

Theagenis Dionysatos
Personal information
- Full name: Theagenis Dionysatos
- Date of birth: 17 February 1975 (age 51)
- Place of birth: Mytilene, Greece
- Height: 1.80 m (5 ft 11 in)
- Position: Midfielder

Team information
- Current team: AIO Mytilini (manager)

Senior career*
Years	Team	Apps	(Gls)
?–?	Acharnaikos	7	
1995–2008	Aiolikos	122	
2009–2011	AEL Kalloni		
2011–2014	Aiolikos		

Managerial career
- 2016–2023: Aetos Loutra
- 2024–2025: Aiolikos
- 2025–: AIO Mytilini
- * Club domestic league appearances and goals as of 31 December 2008

Theagenis Dionysatos (Greek: Θεαγένης Διονυσάτος; born 17 February 1975) is a Greek football manager and former player who played as a defensive midfielder.

== Career ==
Born in Mytilene, Dionysatos has spent most of his career with local side Aiolikos F.C., playing in over 100 matches in the third-tier of Greek football. In December 2008, the 33-year-old joined AEL Kalloni from Aiolikos. He had played for Aiolikos in the Gamma Ethniki during the 1995–96, 1997–98 and 2007–08 seasons.

He has since returned to Aiolikos and was voted captain of the Delta Ethniki side in 2011.
