= Franco Calero =

Argentine professional footballer

Personal information
- Full name: Franco Néstor Calero
- Date of birth: 9 March 1989 (age 37)
- Place of birth: Rosario, Argentina
- Height: 1.80 m (5 ft 11 in)
- Position: Forward

Youth career
- 1993–2004: Newell's Old Boys

Senior career*
| Years | Team | Apps | (Gls) |
| 2004 | Newell's Old Boys | 0 | (0) |
| 2005 | Nacional | 0 | (0) |
| 2005–2008 | Durazno | 20 | (8) |
| 2008 | Atlético Madrid B | ? | (?) |
| 2009 | Zürich | ? | (?) |
| 2009–2010 | 1860 Munich | ? | (?) |
| 2010–2011 | Argentino | 23 | (2) |
| 2011–2012 | Estudiantes | 2 | (0) |
| 2012 | Real Zaragoza B | ? | (?) |
| 2012 | Villarreal B | ? | (?) |
| 2013 | Sariñena | 0 | (0) |
| 2013 | → Robres (loan) | 2 | (0) |
| 2014 | Alfonso Ugarte | 18 | (8) |
| 2014–2015 | Kissamikos | 14 | (7) |
| 2015 | Ansar | ? | (?) |
| 2015 | Ironi Kiryat Shmona | 0 | (0) |
| 2016 | Rio Claro | 0 | (0) |
| 2016 | Rangers | ? | (?) |
| 2016 | Unión Rosario | ? | (?) |
| 2017 | Aucas | 8 | (1) |
| 2018 | Kabuscorp | ? | (?) |
| 2019 | El Farolito | 6 | (1) |
| 2019 | Cumbayá | ? | (?) |
- * Club domestic league appearances and goals

Franco Néstor Calero (born 9 March 1989) is an Argentine professional footballer who plays as a forward.

Calero has played in five of FIFA's six confederations: AFC, CAF, CONCACAF, CONMEBOL and UEFA.

== Career ==
Calero started with Newell's Old Boys from 1993, though never made a senior appearance. He moved to Uruguay with Nacional in 2005 and, months later, Durazno. He scored eight goals in twenty fixtures for the latter in the Segunda División in 2008. The aforementioned year saw Calero join La Liga side Atlético Madrid B; though he wouldn't feature competitively. Further stints in Europe occurred with Zürich (Switzerland) and 1860 Munich (Germany), prior to Calero returning to Argentina with Primera D Metropolitana's Argentino. Twenty-three games and two goals followed. Estudiantes of Torneo Argentino B signed Calero in June 2011.

After just two appearances for Estudiantes, Calero went back to Spanish football with Real Zaragoza B; and subsequently Villarreal B. In the following six months from August 2013, Calero spent time with fellow lower league teams Sariñena and Robres. In 2014, Calero joined Peruvian Segunda División side Alfonso Ugarte. He scored eight goals in a few months with the club. On 14 August, Kissamikos of the Gamma Ethniki in Greece became Calero's fourteenth senior team. Seven goals in fourteen fixtures soon arrived in 2014–15 as they won promotion to tier two. Calero left in 2015, securing a deal with Lebanon's Ansar.

Calero joined Ironi Kiryat Shmona in mid-2015 in Israel, though only played in the Toto Cup against Maccabi Haifa in October. Moves to Rio Claro, Rangers and Unión Rosario came in 2016. Aucas of the Ecuadorian Serie B agreed terms with Calero in early 2017. He netted once over Imbabura, on the way to promotion. Calero had a spell in Angola with Kabuscorp in 2018, before moving to the United States with El Farolito of the NPSL. He appeared in games with Academica, FC Davis and East Bay FC Stompers in his opening months, alongside an eleven-minute cameo in the U.S. Open Cup versus Fresno FC.

To end 2019, Calero had a stint in the Ecuadorian Serie B with Cumbayá FC.

== Career statistics ==
As of 16 May 2019.

Appearances and goals by club, season and competition
| Club | Season | League | | | Cup | | League Cup | | Continental | | Other | | Total | |
| Club | Season | Division | Apps | Goals | Apps | Goals | Apps | Goals | Apps | Goals | Apps | Goals | Apps | Goals |
|---|---|---|---|---|---|---|---|---|---|---|---|---|---|---|
| Nacional | 2005 | Uruguayan Primera División | 0 | 0 | — | | — | | 0 | 0 | 0 | 0 | 0 | 0 |
| Durazno | 2007–08 | Uruguayan Segunda División | 20 | 8 | — | | — | | — | | 0 | 0 | 20 | 8 |
| Argentino | 2010–11 | Primera D Metropolitana | 23 | 2 | 0 | 0 | — | | — | | 0 | 0 | 23 | 2 |
| Estudiantes | 2011–12 | Torneo Argentino B | 2 | 0 | 0 | 0 | — | | — | | 0 | 0 | 2 | 0 |
| Sariñena | 2013–14 | Segunda División B | 0 | 0 | 0 | 0 | 0 | 0 | — | | 0 | 0 | 0 | 0 |
| Robres (loan) | 2013–14 | Regional Preferente | 2 | 0 | 0 | 0 | — | | — | | 0 | 0 | 2 | 0 |
| Alfonso Ugarte | 2014 | Peruvian Segunda División | 18 | 8 | 4 | 1 | — | | — | | 0 | 0 | 22 | 9 |
| Kissamikos | 2014–15 | Gamma Ethniki | 14 | 7 | 0 | 0 | — | | — | | 0 | 0 | 14 | 7 |
| Ironi Kiryat Shmona | 2015–16 | Premier League | 0 | 0 | 0 | 0 | 1 | 0 | — | | 0 | 0 | 1 | 0 |
| Rio Claro | 2016 | Campeonato Paulista | 0 | 0 | 0 | 0 | — | | — | | 0 | 0 | 0 | 0 |
| Aucas | 2017 | Serie B | 8 | 1 | 0 | 0 | — | | — | | 0 | 0 | 8 | 1 |
| El Farolito | 2019 | NPSL | 6 | 1 | 1 | 0 | — | | — | | 0 | 0 | 7 | 1 |
| Career total | | | 91 | 27 | 5 | 1 | 1 | 0 | 0 | 0 | 0 | 0 | 97 | 28 |

== Honours ==
Kissamikos

- Gamma Ethniki: 2014–15 Group 4
