= Giannis Christofilopoulos =

Greek association footballer

Personal information
- Full name: Ioannis Christofilopoulos
- Date of birth: 17 July 2003 (age 23)
- Place of birth: Greece
- Height: 1.86 m (6 ft 1 in)
- Position: Centre-back

Youth career
- Panionios
- Olympiacos

Senior career*
Years	Team	Apps	(Gls)
2021–2022	Olympiacos B	2	(0)
2022–2023	AEK Athens B	5	(0)
2023–2024	Egaleo	0	(0)
2024–2025	Panegialios		

International career^{‡}
2021	Greece U19	1	(0)
- * Club domestic league appearances and goals as of 16 June 2023 ‡ National team caps and goals as of 4 September 2021

Giannis Christofilopoulos (Greek: Γιάννης Χριστοφιλόπουλος; born 17 July 2003) is a Greek professional footballer who plays as a centre-back.

On 27 August 2024, he signed with Panegialios F.C.
