= Nikos Giannitsanis =

Greek footballer (born 1994)

Personal information
- Full name: Nikolaos Iakovos Giannitsanis
- Date of birth: 16 February 1994 (age 32)
- Place of birth: Athens, Greece
- Height: 1.83 m (6 ft 0 in)
- Position: Centre forward

Team information
- Current team: Kyanos Asteras Vari

Youth career
- Panathinaikos

Senior career*
Years	Team	Apps	(Gls)
2012–2015	Panathinaikos	3	(0)
2014	→ Niki Volos (loan)	7	(0)
2015	Lamia	2	(0)
2015–2016	Panelefsiniakos	29	(9)
2016–2018	AEL	10	(1)
2016–2017	→ Trikala (loan)	31	(15)
2018	Trikala	19	(2)
2018–2019	Meuselwitz	26	(9)
2019–2020	Apollon Smyrnis	7	(0)
2020–2021	PAEEK		
2021–2022	A.E. Kifisia	15	(0)
2022–2023	Proodeftiki	18	(1)
2022–2023	Fostiras		
2023–2024	Marko		
2024–2025	Nea Artaki		
2025–2026	Olympiacos Volos		
2026–	Kyanos Asteras Vari		

International career
2010–2012	Greece U17	7	(3)
2012	Greece U18	3	(0)
2012–2013	Greece U19	7	(0)
- * Club domestic league appearances and goals as of 15 February 2026

Nikos Giannitsanis (Greek: Νίκος Γιαννιτσάνης; born 16 February 1994) is a Greek professional footballer who plays as centre forward for Gamma Ethniki club Kyanos Asteras Vari.

== Club career ==
=== Early career ===
On 19 October 2012, Giannitsanis along with three other players, signed his first professional contract with Panathinaikos. On 19 December 2012 he made his professional debut with Panathinaikos. On 9 July 2014 he was loaned to Niki Volos. After being released from Panathinaikos he signed a contract with Lamia. On 26 August 2015 he signed a contract with Panelefsiniakos.

=== AEL and Trikala ===
His productive season gained him a three-year contract with Super League side AEL. One month later he was loaned to Trikala. On 6 November 2016 he scored his first goal in an away loss against Panserraikos. On 23 April 2017, he scored his first career hat-trick in a 5–0 home win against Aiginiakos. He appeared in 36 games, 31 for the Football League and 5 for the Cup, scoring 15 and 2 goals respectively.

=== Return to AEL ===
On 28 August 2017 he made his debut for AEL in a 1–1 home draw against Asteras Tripolis. On 25 October 2017, he scored his first goal in a 3–0 home win against Panachaiki for the Cup.

=== Return to Trikala ===
On 10 January 2018, he returned to Trikala.

=== Meuselwitz ===
On 16 July 2018, he agreed to join Meuselwitz on a free stransfer.

=== Apollon Smyrnis ===
On 11 July 2019, he signed a contract with Apollon Smyrnis.

== Club statistics ==
As of 15 July 2019

Club	Season	League			Cup		Other		Total	
Club	Season	Division	Apps	Goals	Apps	Goals	Apps	Goals	Apps	Goals
Panathinaikos	2012–13	Super League Greece	0	0	1	0	—		1	0
Panathinaikos	2013–14	Super League Greece	2	0	0	0	—		2	0
Panathinaikos	Total		2	0	1	0	—		3	0
Niki Volos (loan)	2014–15	Super League Greece	6	0	1	0	—		7	0
Lamia	2014–15	Football League	2	0	0	0	—		2	0
Panelefsiniakos	2015–16	Football League	26	9	3	0	—		29	9
Trikala (loan)	2016–17	Football League	31	15	5	2	—		36	17
AEL	2017–18	Super League Greece	8	0	2	1	—		10	1
Trikala	2017–18	Football League	19	2	0	0	—		19	2
Meuselwitz	2018–19	Regionalliga Nordost	26	9	4	0	—		30	9
Career total			120	35	16	3	0	0	136	38

== Honours ==
Panathinaikos

- Greek Cup: 2014
