= 2015–16 Football League (Greece) =

Football League
- Season: 2015–16
- Dates: 27 September 2015 – 29 May 2016
- Champions: AEL
- Promoted: AEL; Kerkyra
- Relegated: Zakynthos; Panachaiki; Olympiacos Volos; Ergotelis

The 2015–16 Football League is the second division of the Greek professional football system and the sixth season under the name Football League after previously being known as Beta Ethniki. Its season began on 27 September 2015 and ended on 29 May 2016.

== Teams ==
Location of teams in 2015–16 Football League

Team	Location	Stadium	Capacity	Last season
Acharnaikos	Menidi	Acharnes Stadium	4,450	South Group, 7th & South Group Relegation Play-offs, 1st
AEL	Larissa	AEL FC Arena	16,118	North Group, 2nd & Promotion Play-offs, 4th
Agrotikos Asteras	Evosmos	Agrotikos Asteras Ground	2,267	North Group, 9th & North Group Relegation Play-offs, 1st
Anagennisi Karditsa	Karditsa	Karditsa Stadium	9,500	North Group, 6th & North Group Relegation Play-offs, 3rd
Apollon Smyrnis	Athens	Georgios Kamaras Stadium	14,856	South Group, 3rd & Promotion Play-offs, 3rd
Chania	Chania	Perivolia Municipal Stadium	2,800	South Group, 4th
~~Ergotelis~~*	~~Heraklion~~	~~Pankritio Stadium~~	~~26,000~~	~~SL, 15th~~
Kallithea	Kallithea	Grigoris Lambrakis Stadium	4,250	South Group, 8th & South Group Relegation Play-offs, 3rd
Kerkyra	Corfu	Kerkyra Stadium	2,191	SL, 18th (Kerkyra relegated for illegal transfer of shares and was given the last position of the league table.)
Kissamikos	Kissamos	Maleme Stadium	700	Gamma Ethniki, Group 4, 1st
Lamia	Lamia	Lamia Stadium	6,000	North Group, 4th
~~Olympiacos Volos~~ *	~~Volos~~	~~Volos Municipal Stadium~~	~~9,000~~	~~North Group, 3rd & Promotion Play-offs, 5th~~
Panachaiki	Patras	Kostas Davourlis Stadium	11,321	South Group, 2nd & Promotion Play-offs, 6th
Panegialios	Aigio	Aigio Stadium	4,500	South Group, 6th & South Group Relegation Play-offs, 2nd
Panelefsiniakos	Eleusina	Municipal Stadium of Eleusina	2,100	Gamma Ethniki, Group 3, 1st
Panserraikos	Serres	Serres Municipal Stadium	9,500	Gamma Ethniki, Group 1, 1st
Trikala	Trikala	Trikala Municipal Stadium	14,000	Gamma Ethniki, Group 2, 1st
Zakynthos	Zakynthos	Zakynthians Olympic Champions Ground	2,000	North Group, 5th & North Group Relegation Play-offs, 2nd

* withdrew during the season

== Notes ==
OFI and Niki Volos withdrew from the league. As a result of this they will participate in 2015–16 Gamma Ethniki.

== Structure ==
There are eighteen clubs that compete in the Football League, playing each other in a home and away series. At the end of the season, the bottom four teams are relegated to Gamma Ethniki. The top two teams gain automatic promotion for Super League. All teams in the Football League take part in the Greek Football Cup.

== League table ==
Pos	Team	Pld	W	D	L	GF	GA	GD	Pts	Promotion or relegation
1	AEL (C, P)	34	24	6	4	49	15	+34	78	Promotion to Super League
2	Kerkyra (P)	34	23	6	5	57	24	+33	75	Promotion to Super League
3	Trikala	34	19	10	5	53	22	+31	67	
4	Apollon Smyrnis (Note: Apollon Smyrnis were deducted 3 points for illegal use of foreign players.)	34	18	10	6	46	19	+27	61	
5	Lamia	34	16	11	7	41	24	+17	59	
6	Kissamikos	34	13	12	9	29	19	+10	51	
7	Kallithea (Note: Zakynthos, Kallithea and Panachaiki were deducted 3 points.)	34	15	7	12	41	31	+10	49	
8	Anagennisi Karditsa	34	13	6	15	30	34	−4	45	
9	Acharnaikos	34	12	9	13	30	29	+1	45	
10	Panserraikos	34	12	7	15	39	43	−4	43	
11	Agrotikos Asteras	34	11	10	13	27	24	+3	43	
12	Chania	34	10	11	13	34	37	−3	41	
13	Panegialios	34	11	8	15	34	40	−6	41	
14	Panelefsiniakos	34	10	5	19	34	53	−19	35	
15	Zakynthos (R)	34	10	7	17	31	32	−1	34	Relegation to Gamma Ethniki
16	Panachaiki (R)	34	8	7	19	26	47	−21	28	Relegation to Gamma Ethniki
17	Olympiacos Volos (Note: Olympiacos Volos withdrew from the league and they were deducted 9 points.) (R)	33	5	4	24	16	69	−53	10	Relegation to Gamma Ethniki
18	Ergotelis (Note: Ergotelis withdrew from the league and they were deducted 12 points.) (R)	33	5	4	24	18	73	−55	7	Relegation to Gamma Ethniki

Source: Football League
Rules for classification: 1) Points; 2) Head-to-head points; 3) Head-to-head goal difference; 4) Goals scored; 5) Goals against; 6) Play-offs (neutral ground, only used if needed to decide teams for promotion or relegation).
(C) Champions; (P) Promoted; (R) Relegated

=== Matches ===
Home \ Away	AEL	ACH	AGR	KRD	APS	CHA	ERG	KLT	KER	KIS	LAM	OVL	PCK	PEG	PNF	PSE	TRI	ZAK
AEL		2–0	2–1	3–0	1–0	3–0	2–1	1–0	0–1	1–0	3–0	1–0	1–0	1–2	3–1	1–0	2–0	2–0
Acharnaikos	1–2		2–0	1–0	0–1	0–3^{1}	1–2	1–1	0–0	0–1	1–0	1–1	3–0	3–1	1–0	2–1	1–2	1–0
Agrotikos Asteras	0–1	0–0		0–1	0–1	1–0	3–0^{2}	2–1	3–1	0–0	0–0	3–0^{3}	0–0	0–0	2–0	0–0	1–2	1–0
Anagennisi Karditsa	1–1	1–0	0–0		1–3	0–0	0–0	1–1	1–2	0–1	0–1	3–0^{3}	1–0	3–1	2–0	1–0	2–1	2–0
Apollon Smyrnis	0–0	0–1	0–2	5–0		1–0	3–0	3–0	1–2	1–0	1–0	3–0^{3}	1–1	1–1	3–1	1–1	0–0	3–2
Chania	0–0	0–1	1–0	2–0	0–0		3–0^{2}	0–1	0–3^{4}	0–1	1–3	3–0^{3}	2–0	3–2	2–0	1–1	2–2	1–0
Ergotelis	0–3^{2}	0–3^{2}	1–2	0–3^{2}	0–3^{2}	0–1		0–3^{2}	0–3^{2}	0–3^{2}	1–1	0–0	3–1	3–2	3–1	0–3^{2}	1–1	0–3^{2}
Kallithea	0–1	1–0	2–0	1–0	0–1	2–0	1–0		2–0	2–1	0–0	1–0	4–2	1–2	1–2	1–1	1–1	1–1
Kerkyra	0–0	2–0	2–1	2–0	2–0	1–1	1–2	1–0		2–0	3–2	3–1	2–1	1–0	3–0	1–0	1–0	4–0
Kissamikos	2–2	1–1	1–0	0–1	0–0	0–0	2–1	0–0	0–1		0–0	0–1	3–1	2–0	1–0	2–0	1–1	1–0
Lamia	1–0	1–1	1–0	2–1	0–0	3–0	3–0^{2}	2–1	1–1	0–0		3–0^{3}	4–1	1–0	1–1	2–0	0–1	1–0
Olympiacos Volos	0–3^{3}	0–3^{3}	0–0	0–3	1–2	1–0		0–3^{3}	0–3^{3}	0–3^{3}	1–0		2–2	2–1	5–1	0–3^{3}	0–3^{3}	0–3^{3}
Panachaiki	1–1	1–0	0–1	1–0	0–2	0–0	3–0^{2}	0–1	1–0	0–1	0–1	3–0^{3}		0–1	1–4	0–1	0–0	0–0
Panegialios	0–1	0–0	2–2	0–0	0–0	1–1	3–0^{2}	0–3	0–1	1–0	1–3	3–0^{3}	0–1		2–0	1–0	0–0	2–0
Panelefsiniakos	0–2	1–1	1–0	0–1	0–1	3–1	3–0^{2}	2–1	1–3	0–0	1–1	3–0^{3}	0–3	0–2		1–0	0–1	1–0
Panserraikos	0–2	3–0	1–2	2–0	0–5	2–2	3–0^{2}	3–2	2–2	1–0	0–2	2–1	1–2	3–2	2–2		0–1	1–0
Trikala	3–0	1–0	0–0	3–1	0–1	2–1	3–0^{2}	2–0	3–2	2–2	1–1	3–0^{3}	3–0	4–0	3–1	3–0		1–0
Zakynthos	0–1	0–0	1–0	1–0	0–0	3–3	3–0	1–2	1–1	0–0	3–0	1–0	4–0	0–1	2–0	0–2	1–0	

Source: (in Greek)
Legend: Blue = home team win; Yellow = draw; Red = away team win.
- ^{1} The game awarded a 3–0 w/o win to Chania.
- ^{2} The opponents of Ergotelis awarded a 3–0 w/o win each.
- ^{3} The opponents of Olympiakos Volos awarded a 3–0 w/o win each.
- ^{4} The game awarded a 3–0 w/o win to Kerkyra.

== Season statistics ==
=== Top scorers ===
Updated to games played 29 May 2016

Rank	Player	Club	Goals
1	(Greece) Nikos Kouskounas	Trikala	18
2	(Cape Verde) José Emílio Furtado	Panserraikos	13
3	(Greece) Mattheos Maroukakis	AEL	12
4	(Brazil) Jone	Lamia	11
5	(Equatorial Guinea) Viera Ellong	Kerkyra	9
5	(Greece) Alexandros Kontos	Kerkyra	9
5	(Brazil) Wanderson	Apollon Smyrnis	9
5	(Greece) Michalis Fragos	Kallithea	9
5	(Greece) Nikos Giannitsanis	Panelefsiniakos	9
