= 2017–18 Football League (Greece) =

Football League
- Season: 2017–18
- Dates: 28 October 2017 – 28 May 2018
- Champions: OFI
- Promoted: OFI; Aris
- Relegated: Anagennisi Karditsa; Panserraikos; Panegialios; Kallithea; Veria; Acharnaikos
- Matches: 340
- Goals: 570 (1.68 per match)
- Top goalscorer: Dimitrios Manos (27 goals)
- Biggest home win: OFI 7–0 Panegialios (29 April 2018)
- Biggest away win: Panegialios 0–4 AO Chania−Kissamikos (29 April 2018); Sparti 0–4 Apollon Pontus (1 April 2018)

The 2017–18 Football League is the second division of the Greek professional football league system and the seventh season under the name Football League after previously being known as Beta Ethniki. It will start at 28 October,

== Teams ==
Location of teams in 2017–18 Football League

| Team | Location | Stadium | Capacity | Last season |
|---|---|---|---|---|
| ~~Acharnaikos~~^{1} | ~~Acharnes~~ | ~~Acharnes Stadium~~ | ~~4,450~~ | ~~FL, 13th~~ |
| A.E. Karaiskakis | Arta | Municipal Agioi Anargiroi Stadium | 1,900 | Gamma Ethniki (Group 2), 2nd |
| Aiginiakos | Aiginio | Municipal Stadium of Aiginio | 1,000 | FL, 10th |
| Anagennisi Karditsa | Karditsa | Karditsa Stadium | 9,500 | FL, 12th |
| AO Chania−Kissamikos | Chania | Perivolia Municipal Stadium | 4,000 | FL, 11th |
| Apollon Larissa | Larissa | Alcazar Stadium | 13,108 | Gamma Ethniki (Group 2), 1st |
| Apollon Pontus | Thessaloniki | Apollon Kalamaria Stadium | 6,500 | Gamma Ethniki (Group 1), 1st |
| Aris | Thessaloniki | Kleanthis Vikelidis Stadium | 22,800 | FL, 3rd |
| Ergotelis | Heraklion | Pankritio Stadium | 26,240 | Gamma Ethniki (Group 4), 1st |
| Doxa Drama | Drama | Doxa Drama Stadium | 7,000 | Gamma Ethniki (Group 1), 2nd |
| Kallithea | Kallithea | Grigoris Lambrakis Stadium | 4,200 | FL, 14th |
| OFI | Heraklion | Theodoros Vardinogiannis Stadium | 8,500 | FL, 4th |
| Panachaiki | Patra | Kostas Davourlis Stadium | 11,321 | Gamma Ethniki (Group 3), 1st |
| Panegialios | Aigio | Aigio Stadium | 7,000 | FL, 9th |
| Panserraikos | Serres | Serres Municipal Stadium | 9,500 | FL, 8th |
| Sparti | Sparta | Sparta Municipal Stadium | 1,500 | FL, 7th |
| Trikala | Trikala | Trikala Municipal Stadium | 15,000 | FL, 5th |
| ~~Veria~~ | ~~Veria~~ | ~~Veria Stadium~~ | ~~7,000~~ | ~~SL, 16th~~ |

- ^{1} Acharnaikos was expelled during the season

1. Agrotikos Asteras withdrew from the league. As a result of this they will participate in 2017–18 Gamma Ethniki. A.E. Karaiskakis were promoted from the Gamma Ethniki in their place.

2. Iraklis withdrew from the league because of Financial Problems. The Founding Club (Athlitiki Enosis Pontion Katerini) stopped to exist too. The Original Gymnastikos Syllogos Iraklis will decide if a new Football Team will start from The Third Category of the Local Championship Macedonia Football Clubs Association, or if The Football Team Of G.S. Iraklis will be merged with 1st category (A1) Macedonia Football Clubs Association club Iraklis Ampelokipi, as it happened before 5 years with Athlitiki Enosis Pontion Katerinis F.C.. Doxa Dramas were promoted from the Gamma Ethniki in their place.

== Structure ==
There are eighteen clubs that compete in the Football League, playing each other in a home and away series. At the end of the season, the bottom six teams are relegated to Gamma Ethniki. The top two teams gain automatic promotion for Super League. All teams in the Football League take part in the Greek Football Cup.

== League table ==
| Pos | Team | Pld | W | D | L | GF | GA | GD | Pts | Promotion or relegation |
|---|---|---|---|---|---|---|---|---|---|---|
| 1 | OFI (C, P) | 34 | 27 | 5 | 2 | 86 | 14 | +72 | 86 | Promotion to Super League |
| 2 | Aris (P) | 34 | 26 | 7 | 1 | 65 | 13 | +52 | 85 | Promotion to Super League |
| 3 | Panachaiki | 34 | 22 | 7 | 5 | 50 | 21 | +29 | 73 | |
| 4 | AO Chania − Kissamikos | 34 | 19 | 7 | 8 | 64 | 32 | +32 | 64 | |
| 5 | Doxa Drama | 34 | 18 | 9 | 7 | 57 | 25 | +32 | 63 | |
| 6 | Trikala | 34 | 16 | 10 | 8 | 31 | 22 | +9 | 58 | |
| 7 | Apollon Pontus | 34 | 14 | 11 | 9 | 43 | 27 | +16 | 53 | |
| 8 | A.E. Karaiskakis | 34 | 13 | 9 | 12 | 35 | 32 | +3 | 48 | |
| 9 | Ergotelis | 34 | 13 | 7 | 14 | 56 | 47 | +9 | 46 | |
| 10 | Apollon Larissa (Note: Panegialios, Kallithea, Panserraikos, Sparti, Apollon Larissa, Anagennisi Karditsa were deducted six points, after their failure to pass the first stage of surveillance twice.) | 34 | 16 | 1 | 17 | 45 | 54 | −9 | 43 | |
| 11 | Aiginiakos (Note: Aiginiakos were deducted three points , after their failure to pass the first stage of surveillance) | 34 | 11 | 7 | 16 | 36 | 54 | −18 | 37 | |
| 12 | Sparti | 34 | 11 | 7 | 16 | 29 | 46 | −17 | 34 | |
| 13 | Anagennisi Karditsa (R) | 34 | 11 | 7 | 16 | 32 | 41 | −9 | 34 | Relegation to Gamma Ethniki |
| 14 | Panserraikos (R) | 34 | 9 | 6 | 19 | 43 | 52 | −9 | 27 | Relegation to Gamma Ethniki |
| 15 | Panegialios (R) | 34 | 8 | 7 | 19 | 29 | 57 | −28 | 25 | Relegation to Gamma Ethniki |
| 16 | Kallithea (R) | 34 | 6 | 9 | 19 | 26 | 40 | −14 | 21 | Relegation to Gamma Ethniki |
| 17 | Veria (Note: Veria withdrew from the league on 22 February 2018 and were deducted twelve points, for unpaid wages to former club players Antonio Tomás & Roberto Battión.) (R) | 33 | 5 | 2 | 26 | 13 | 70 | −57 | 5 | Relegation to Gamma Ethniki |
| 18 | Acharnaikos (Note: Acharnaikos were deducted fifty four points, for unpaid wages to former club players.) (R) | 33 | 1 | 0 | 32 | 2 | 95 | −93 | −51 | Relegation to Gamma Ethniki |

Source: Soccerway and Football League News
Rules for classification: 1) Points; 2) Head-to-head points; 3) Head-to-head goal difference; 4) Goals scored; 5) Goals against; 6) Play-offs (neutral ground, only used if needed to decide teams for promotion or relegation).
(C) Champions; (P) Promoted; (R) Relegated

== Matches ==
| Home \ Away | ACH | KAR | EGN | KRD | KIS | APL | APO | ARI | DDR | ERG | KLT | OFI | PCK | PEG | PSE | SPA | TRI | VER |
|---|---|---|---|---|---|---|---|---|---|---|---|---|---|---|---|---|---|---|
| Acharnaikos | | 0–3^{1} | 0–3^{1} | 0–3^{1} | 0–3^{1} | 1–0 | 0–3^{1} | 0–3^{1} | 0–3^{1} | 0–3^{1} | 0–3^{1} | 0–3^{1} | 0–3^{1} | 0–3^{1} | 0–3^{1} | 0–3^{1} | 0–3^{1} | 0–3^{1} |
| A.E. Karaiskakis | 1–0 | | 2–0 | 3–1 | 2–2 | 2–0 | 2–1 | 0–2 | 0–0 | 2–1 | 1–0 | 1–2 | 0–1 | 2–0 | 3–0 | 2–1 | 0–1 | 3–0^{2} |
| Aiginiakos | 3–0^{1} | 2–0 | | 1–1 | 1–1 | 1–2 | 2–1 | 1–4 | 0–2 | 3–2 | 2–0 | 0–3 | 0–2 | 1–1 | 1–0 | 2–0 | 0–0 | 1–1 |
| Anagennisi Karditsa | 3–0^{1} | 1–0 | 2–0 | | 3–3 | 2–0 | 0–2 | 0–1 | 0–1 | 2–1 | 2–1 | 0–0 | 1–2 | 1–0 | 1–0 | 1–0 | 0–0 | 3–0^{2} |
| AO Chania−Kissamikos | 4–1 | 1–0 | 3–1 | 1–0 | | 7–0 | 2–1 | 2–3 | 2–1 | 0–3 | 2–0 | 1–1 | 1–2 | 2–0 | 2–0 | 0–2 | 3–0 | 3–0^{2} |
| Apollon Larissa | 3–0^{1} | 3–1 | 1–0 | 4–1 | 2–0 | | 1–0 | 0–2 | 1–3 | 3–2 | 4–3 | 1–0 | 0–1 | 3–2 | 3–0 | 2–0 | 0–1 | 1–3 |
| Apollon Pontus | 3–0^{1} | 0–0 | 2–0 | 2–0 | 0–1 | 1–0 | | 0–0 | 1–1 | 1–1 | 1–0 | 0–1 | 0–0 | 4–1 | 2–1 | 0–0 | 1–1 | 3–0^{2} |
| Aris | 3–0^{1} | 0–0 | 5–0 | 3–0 | 1–0 | 3–0 | 2–0 | | 1–0 | 3–0 | 2–0 | 0–0 | 2–1 | 5–2 | 2–0 | 1–0 | 0–0 | 3–0^{2} |
| Doxa Drama | 3–0^{1} | 0–0 | 3–3 | 2–0 | 1–1 | 2–2 | 3–1 | 1–2 | | 4–0 | 2–0 | 1–1 | 2–0 | 0–0 | 3–1 | 7–0 | 0–0 | 3–0^{2} |
| Ergotelis | 3–0^{1} | 4–1 | 5–1 | 1–0 | 1–1 | 3–1 | 1–1 | 2–3 | 0–1 | | 0–0 | 2–4 | 2–1 | 5–1 | 0–3 | 0–0 | 0–2 | 3–0^{2} |
| Kallithea | 3–0^{1} | 1–1 | 0–0 | 3–1 | 0–3 | 0–1 | 0–1 | 0–0 | 0–1 | 0–0 | | 1–3 | 0–3 | 2–1 | 3–1 | 0–0 | 0–1 | 1–1 |
| OFI | 3–0^{1} | 3–0 | 6–0 | 1–0 | 3–0 | 4–0 | 3–1 | 2–0 | 3–0 | 4–2 | 2–1 | | 1–2 | 7–0 | 2–0 | 5–0 | 3–0 | 3–0 |
| Panachaiki | 3–0^{1} | 2–0 | 0–1 | 4–1 | 0–0 | 2–0 | 0–0 | 1–1 | 1–0 | 2–1 | 1–0 | 0–3 | | 2–0 | 1–1 | 2–1 | 2–0 | 2–0 |
| Panegialios | 3–0^{1} | 0–0 | 2–1 | 0–0 | 0–4 | 0–1 | 1–2 | 0–0 | 1–0 | 1–0 | 0–0 | 0–2 | 1–2 | | 3–2 | 1–0 | 0–1 | 3–0^{2} |
| Panserraikos | 3–0^{1} | 2–0 | 1–2 | 1–1 | 0–2 | 2–1 | 3–3 | 1–3 | 3–4 | 0–1 | 1–1 | 1–2 | 1–1 | 3–0 | | 3–1 | 1–1 | 1–0 |
| Sparti | 3–0^{1} | 1–1 | 1–0 | 2–0 | 1–3 | 2–0 | 0–4 | 0–3 | 1–0 | 2–2 | 1–0 | 0–3 | 0–0 | 1–1 | 1–0 | | 1–0 | 3–0^{2} |
| Trikala | 3–0^{1} | 0–0 | 1–0 | 1–1 | 2–1 | 3–1 | 0–0 | 0–1 | 0–1 | 0–3 | 1–0 | 0–0 | 0–1 | 1–0 | 2–1 | 2–1 | | 3–0^{2} |
| Veria | –^{3} | 0–2 | 0–3^{2} | 1–0 | 0–3^{2} | 0–3^{2} | 0–1 | 0–1 | 0–2 | 0–2 | 0–3^{2} | 0–3^{2} | 0–3^{2} | 3–1 | 0–3^{2} | 1–0 | 0–1 | |

Source: Football League
Legend: Blue = home team win; Yellow = draw; Red = away team win.
- ^{1} The opponents of Acharnaikos awarded a 3–0 w/o win each.
- ^{2} The opponents of Veria awarded a 3–0 w/o win each.
- ^{3} Game did not held

== Top scorers ==
Updated to games played on 28 May 2018

| Rank | Player | Club | Goals |
|---|---|---|---|
| 1 | (Greece) Dimitrios Manos | OFI | 27 |
| 2 | (Belgium) Hugo Cuypers | Ergotelis | 22 |
| 3 | (Greece) Nikos Kouskounas | OFI/Doxa Drama | 18 |
| 4 | (Greece) Dimitrios Diamantopoulos | Aris | 16 |
| 5 | (Greece) Panagiotis Moraitis | Panachaiki | 13 |
| 6 | (Greece) Giannis Loukinas | A.E. Karaiskakis | 11 |
| 6 | (Greece) Georgios Xydas | AO Chania−Kissamikos | 11 |
| 8 | (Greece) Athanasios Dinas | Trikala/OFI | 10 |
| 8 | (Greece) Vasilios Koutsianikoulis | OFI | 10 |
