= AIO Mytilini F.C. =

Association football club in Greece

AIO Mytilini
- Full name: Athlitikos Ekpolitistikos Podosfairikos Syllogos AIO Mytilini
- Founded: 17 June 2025; 16 months ago
- Ground: Mytilene Municipal Stadium
- Capacity: 3,300
- Chairman: Ioannis Sialas
- Manager: Theagenis Dionysatos
- League: Lesbos FCA First Division
- 2025–26: Lesbos FCA Second Division, 1st (promoted)
- Website: Official website
Home colours	Away colours

AIO Mytilini (Greek: ΑΙΟ Μυτιλήνης) is a Greek football club based in Mytilene, Lesbos. Its official colours are blue and white.

== History ==
AIO Mytilini is the successor club of Aiolikos. In August 2024, Aiolikos formalized a partnership with Apollon Vounaraki, which led to Aiolikos competing in the Lesvos FCA Second Division during the 2024–25 season, winning the league title. On 17 June 2025, it was decided to dissolve the football department of Aiolikos, due to outstanding debts and establish a new club under the name A.E.P.S. "AIO" Mytilini (derived from the nickname of the previous club).

AIO Mytilini competed for the first time, during the 2025–26 season, in the Lesbos FCA Second Division and won the league and the promotion to the First Division.

== Stadium ==
Mytilene Municipal Stadium is a multi-use stadium in Mytilene, Greece. It is currently used mostly for football matches and was the home stadium of Aiolikos. The stadium holds 3,300 people, all-seated.

== Honours ==
=== Regional titles ===
- Lesbos FCA Second Division: 1
  - 2025–26
