= Dijilly Vouho =

Ivorian footballer

Personal information
- Full name: Dijilly Arsène Dit Patrick Vouho
- Date of birth: 25 June 1987 (age 39)
- Place of birth: Seguela, Ivory Coast
- Height: 1.85 m (6 ft 1 in)
- Position: Striker

Senior career*
Years	Team	Apps	(Gls)
2006–2007	Sabé Sports	10	(7)
2007–2011	Académica	20	(1)
2008	→ Portimonense (loan)	9	(5)
2008–2009	→ Santa Clara (loan)	22	(3)
2010–2011	→ Covilhã (loan)	23	(1)
2011–2013	AEL Limassol	48	(20)
2013–2015	Dinamo Tbilisi	20	(2)
2015	Santa Clara	21	(2)
2015–2016	Atlético	30	(9)
2016–2017	OFI	27	(15)
2017–2018	Lamia	10	(1)
2018–2019	OFI	34	(8)
2019–2020	Apollon Smyrnis	8	(0)
2021–2023	Ierapetra	53	(19)
2023–2024	Chania	3	(2)
2024–25	Marko	6	(3)
2025	Ierapetra		
- * Club domestic league appearances and goals as of 17:25, 27 April 2025 (UTC)

Djilly Arsène Dit Patrick Vouho (born 25 June 1987) is a former Ivorian professional footballer who played as a striker.

== Career ==
Born in Seguela, Worodougou, Vouho moved to Portugal at the age of 20, signing with Académica de Coimbra from Sabé Sports de Bouna. He made his Primeira Liga debut on 2 September 2007, starting and playing 57 minutes in a 0–2 away loss against C.S. Marítimo. In January of the following year, he was loaned to Portimonense S.C. until June.

Vouho's only season in the Portuguese top flight was 2009–10, when he scored once in 15 games for Académica. On either side of that spell, he competed in the country's Segunda Liga with C.D. Santa Clara and S.C. Covilhã, also on loan.

In 2011–12, Vouho netted nine goals to help AEL Limassol conquer its first Cypriot First Division title in 44 years. He bettered those totals in the following campaign, but his team could only rank fifth.

In January 2015, following a spell in Georgia with FC Dinamo Tbilisi, where he won a Georgian Cup, Vouho returned to Portugal and Santa Clara. In the summer, he joined another club in the second tier, Atlético Clube de Portugal.

Afterwards, Vouho played in Greece, starting out at OFI in the Football League. He scored a career-best 15 goals in his only season, helping to a fourth-place finish.

Vouho remained in the country in the following off-season, signing with Super League team PAS Lamia 1964. He scored his first goal for them on 3 December 2017, in the last minute of the 2–2 home draw against Panetolikos FC.

Vouho returned to OFI on 30 January 2018, as a free agent.

== Honours ==
AEL Limassol

- Cypriot First Division: 2011–12

Dinamo Tbilisi

- Georgian Cup: 2013–14
