= Konstantinos Iliopoulos =

Greek footballer

Personal information
- Full name: Konstantinos Iliopoulos
- Date of birth: 15 March 1989 (age 37)
- Place of birth: Kalamata, Greece
- Height: 1.84 m (6 ft 0 in)
- Position: Winger

Team information
- Current team: Miltiadis

Youth career
- Apollon Petalidi

Senior career*
Years	Team	Apps	(Gls)
2008–2010	Kalamata	44	(4)
2010–2011	Ilioupoli	27	(4)
2011–2012	Vyzas Megara	24	(4)
2012–2015	Kalamata	62	(17)
2015–2017	Sparta	57	(14)
2017–2019	Volos	50	(17)
2020–2021	Kalamata	25	(2)
2021–2023	Diavolitsi		
2023–2024	Erani Filiatra		
2024	Panargiakos		
2024–	Miltiadis		
- * Club domestic league appearances and goals as of 19 June 2021

Konstantinos Iliopoulos (Greek: Κωνσταντίνος Ηλιόπουλος; born 15 March 1989) is a Greek professional footballer who plays as a winger for Gamma Ethniki club Miltiadis Pyrgos Tryfillia.
