= Angelos Piniotis =

Greek footballer

Personal information
- Full name: Michail Angelos Piniotis
- Date of birth: 22 April 1996 (age 30)
- Place of birth: Lamia, Greece
- Height: 1.74 m (5 ft 9 in)
- Position: Midfielder

Team information
- Current team: Egaleo
- Number: 25

Youth career
- Panionios

Senior career*
| Years | Team | Apps | (Gls) |
| 2015–2018 | Panionios | 3 | (0) |
| 2017 | → Kallithea (loan) | 2 | (0) |
| 2018–2019 | Lamia | 0 | (0) |
| 2019 | Diagoras | | |
| 2019 | Panserraikos | | |
| 2019–2020 | Diagoras | 14 | (0) |
| 2020– | Egaleo | 0 | (0) |

International career^{‡}
| 2017 | Greece U21 | 1 | (0) |
- * Club domestic league appearances and goals as of 18 August 2020 ‡ National team caps and goals as of 20 December 2017

Angelos Piniotis (Greek: Άγγελος Πινιώτης; born 22 April 1996) is a Greek professional footballer who plays as a midfielder for Football League club Egaleo.
