= Michail Fragkos =

Greek footballer (born 1990)

Personal information
- Full name: Michail Fragkos
- Date of birth: 20 May 1990 (age 36)
- Place of birth: Rhodes, Greece
- Height: 1.79 m (5 ft 10 in)
- Position: Winger

Senior career*
Years	Team	Apps	(Gls)
2005–2007	Evagoras Rodos		
2007–2009	Thrasyvoulos	2	(0)
2009	→ Preveza (loan)		
2009–2011	Diagoras	18	(2)
2011–2012	Rodos		
2012–2013	Paniliakos	2	(1)
2013	Comarca de Níjar		
2013–2014	Fokikos	25	(13)
2014–2015	Lamia	9	(0)
2015–2016	Kallithea	47	(13)
2016–2017	AEL Kalloni	13	(2)
2017	Sparta	18	(8)
2017–2018	Lamia	9	(0)
2018–2019	Volos	20	(8)
2019	Ialysos		
2020	Aspropyrgos		
2020–2021	PAEEK	27	(21)
2021–2022	VfB Auerbach	26	(10)
2022–2023	Irodotos	1	(0)
2023	P.A.O. Rouf		
2023–2025	Asteras Stavros		
2025–2026	Lamia		

International career
2008	Greece U19	1	(0)
- * Club domestic league appearances and goals as of 21:00, 23 October 2024 (UTC)

Michail Fragkos (Greek: Μιχάλης Φράγκος; born 20 May 1990) is a Greek professional footballer who plays as a winger.

== Career ==
In summer 2020, Fragkos signed for Cypriot Second Division club PAEEK. In September 2021, he joined German side VfB Auerbach in the Regionalliga.

== Honours ==
Volos

- Football League Greece: 2018–19

PAEEK

- Cypriot Second Division: 2020–21
