= Ilias Anastasakos =

Greek footballer (born 1978)

Personal information
- Date of birth: 3 March 1978 (age 48)
- Place of birth: Dafni, Laconia, Greece
- Height: 1.85 m (6 ft 1 in)
- Positions: Striker; left midfielder

Team information
- Current team: Olympiacos Assos

Youth career
- 1990–: Pangythiakos
- Leonidas Lykovrisi

Senior career*
Years	Team	Apps	(Gls)
–1995	AO Dafniou	60	(58)
1995–2002	AEK Athens	1	(0)
1997–1998	→ Aris Petroupolis (loan)		
1999–2000	→ Apollon Athens (loan)	38	(5)
2000–2001	→ Kalamata (loan)	20	(2)
2002	Athinaikos	10	(1)
2002–2004	Apollon Athens	55	(14)
2004–2006	Asteras Tripolis	61	(29)
2007–2008	Thrasyvoulos	45	(28)
2008–2009	PAOK	16	(7)
2009–2012	Atromitos	57	(16)
2012–2013	Platanias	28	(7)
2013–2014	Ergotelis	18	(4)
2014	AEL	2	(0)
2015–2017	Sparta	49	(18)
2017–2018	AE Pellana	16	(15)
2019–2020	Aris Skala	14	(8)
2020–2022	Iraklis Karya		
2022–	Olympiacos Assos	6	(7)

International career
1996	Greece U19	1	(0)

Managerial career
- 2017–2018: AE Pellana (player-manager)
- 2018–2019: AE Pellana
- * Club domestic league appearances and goals as of 20 August 2022

Ilias Anastasakos (Greek: Ηλίας Αναστασάκος; born 3 March 1978) is a Greek football player who plays as a striker for Olympiacos Assou. He is the co-director of the Super League Athletic Academy Soccer Camp that takes place every summer in New York City.

== Career ==
Anastasakos started his football career from AO Dafniou having previously played in Pangythiakos and Leonidas Glykovrysi. In the summer of 1995, he was transferred to AEK Athens.

During his spell at the club he only appeared one league match. On 1 August 1997 he was loaned to Aris Petroupolis for a season. In January 1999 he was loaned again to Apollon Athens. On 17 July 200 he was loaned to Kalamata for a season. On 18 January 2002 Anastasakos was released from AEK and signed for Athinaikos.

He played for the club of Vyronas until end of the season and then he returned to Apollon Athens playing for 2 seasons. He spent 2 seasons as well at Asteras Tripolis and afterwards signed for Thrasivoulos, where he emerged as the top scorer of the second division in 2008 with 18 goals. His performances at the club of Fyli earned him a transfer to PAOK, where he played for a year, before moving to Atromitos, where he spent 3 seasons and played twice in the Cup final.

In 2012 he moved to Crete to play for Platanias for a season and then he was transferred to Ergotelis. In the summer of 2014, he had a short spell at AEL and in January 2015, he was signed to Sparta, where he played 2 years. In 2017 he joined AE Pellania for two seasons, initially as a player-manager and then solely as a manager. He returned as a footballer in 2019 to play for Aris Skala until 2020. He then moved to Iraklis Karyas, where he played for two seasons. In February 2022 he was announced by Olympiacos Assou.

== Honours ==
AEK Athens

- Greek Cup: 1995–96, 1996–97
- Greek Super Cup: 1996

Individual

- Beta Ethniki top scorer: 2007–08

== International career ==
Anastasakos played for Greece U19 once in 1996.
