= Wanderson (footballer, born February 1994) =

Brazilian footballer

Personal information
- Full name: Wanderson Costa Viana
- Date of birth: February 7, 1994 (age 32)
- Place of birth: Brasília, Brazil
- Height: 1.64 m (5 ft 4 1/2 in)
- Position: Winger

Team information
- Current team: Doxa Petrousas

Youth career
- 2002–2007: Santo Expedito College
- 2007–2009: Olympiacos

Senior career*
| Years | Team | Apps | (Gls) |
| 2009–2012 | Olympiacos | 0 | (0) |
| 2011–2012 | → Doxa Drama (loan) | 13 | (0) |
| 2012–2013 | Ajax Cape Town | 18 | (3) |
| 2014–2016 | Apollon Smyrnis | 54 | (11) |
| 2016–2018 | Lamia | 51 | (2) |
| 2018–2019 | Beroe | 30 | (3) |
| 2020 | Iwate Grulla Morioka | 0 | (0) |
| 2021–2022 | Doxa Drama | 10 | (2) |
| 2022 | Ethnikos Piraeus | | |
| 2022–2023 | Doxa Drama | | |
| 2023– | Doxa Petrousas | | |
- * Club domestic league appearances and goals as of 28 March 2021

Wanderson Costa Viana (born February 7, 1994), commonly known as Wanderson, is a Brazilian professional footballer who plays as a winger.

== Career ==
Wanderson began his professional career in 2009, when he was promoted in the men's team of Olympiacos. In the summer 2011 he was loaned to Doxa Drama for a season.

On 29 June 2018, Wanderson signed with Bulgarian club Beroe.
