= PGS Kissamikos =

Disbanded association football club in Greece

P.G.S. Kissamikos
- Full name: Ποδοσφαιρικός Γυμναστικός Σύλλογος Κισσαμικός; Podosferikós Gymnastikós Sýllogos Kissamikós (Kissamikos Football Gymnastics Club)
- Short name: Kissamikos
- Founded: 1926; 100 years ago
- Dissolved: 2017; 9 years ago

P.G.S. Kissamikos was a Greek football club, based in Kissamos, Chania. The club colors were blue and white, while its crest featured a dolphin.

== History ==
Kissamikos was founded in 1926, representing the town and municipality of Kissamos, Chania. In 1994, the club won its first Chania Football Clubs Association First Division Championship, thus earning promotion to national competitions for the first time in its history. During the 1994–95 Delta Ethniki season, Kissamikos finished in 13th place, thus returning to regional competitions once again.

In 2012–13, Kissamikos achieved promotion to the Gamma Ethniki, the third tier of the Greek football league system, after finishing 6th in the Delta Ethniki Group 10. The club's tenure in third division was rather remarkable, as its first season in the competition saw Kissamikos finish in 4th place playing in Group E, while 2014–15 saw them finishing as champions of Group 4, thus earning their first ever promotion to the Football League.

=== AO Chania – Kissamikos (2017–2019) ===
During the 2016–17 Greek Second Division season, Chania were represented in the Greek Second Division by two clubs, namely AO Chania of the city of Chania, and Kissamikos, based in the neighboring town of Kissamos. Kissamikos had quickly established itself in the Football League, managing to outgrow, and eventually outperform its more prestigious local competitor AO Chania. Facing insurmountable financial issues, AO Chania were forcibly relegated to the Gamma Ethniki at the end of the season after being deducted 33 points, while simultaneously having its licence revoked. In the summer of 2017, Kissamikos owner at the time Antonis Rokakis proposed a merger of the two clubs in an attempt to form a new, strong outfit to represent the region, and more specifically the city of Chania (as the region's competitor in the Greek Super League, Platanias is based in the neighboring town and municipality of Platanias). The initiative was eventually approved on 19 August 2017, however, any club that would result from a potential merger would inherit the financial obligations of AO Chania. As such, Kissamikos changed its name to AO Chania − Kissamikos, retaining its original crest and colors, while the club's home ground was relocated to Perivolia Municipal Stadium in Mournies, Chania. The entire merger was met with fierce opposition by the supporters of Kissamikos. On the other hand, supporters of AO Chania demanded Kissamikos' name and crest be completely erased, basically turning the club into a modern continuation of AO Chania.

The new club became serious competitors in the two years following the merger, finishing 4th during the 2017–18 season, and 6th in 2018–19, thus becoming eligible to play in the 2019-formed Super League 2.

=== P.A.E. Chania (2019–2026) ===
In the summer of 2019, the club's board of directors changed the club's name to P.A.E. Chania (Greek: Π.Α.Ε. Χανιά), indicating their intent to represent the entire Chania regional unit. The 2019–20 season saw Chania FC achieve its best result to date, finishing third in the Super League 2.

With its relegation to the Gamma Ethniki in 2026, P.A.E. Chania returned to the jurisdiction of its parent club P.G.S. Kissamikos.

== Stadium ==
After the merger, the club moved to AO Chania's Perivolia Municipal Stadium, a multi-purpose stadium in Mournies, Chania.

== Honors ==
=== Domestic Titles and honors ===
- Gamma Ethniki: (1)
  - 2014–15
- Chania Champions: (4)
  - 1993–1994, 1996–1997, 2000–2001, 2011–2012
- Chania Cup Winners: (1)
  - 1998–1999
- Chania Super Cup Winners: (1)
  - 2012

== Notable former players ==
Greece

- (Greece) Filippos Darlas
- (Greece) Michail Fragoulakis
- (Greece) Giannis Taralidis

Argentina

- (Argentina) Franco Calero
- (Argentina) Ricardo Verón
