= Trikala Municipal Stadium =

Multi-purpose stadium in Trikala, Greece

Municipal Stadium of Trikala Christos Papanikolaou - Sofia Sakorafa
- Interactive map of Municipal Stadium of Trikala Christos Papanikolaou - Sofia Sakorafa
- Former names: National Stadium of Trikala
- Location: Trikala, Greece
- Coordinates: 39°33′7.52″N 21°46′37.27″E
- Owner: Municipality of Trikala
- Operator: Trikala FC
- Capacity: 15,000
- Surface: Grass
- Scoreboard: Yes
- Record attendance: 18,231

Construction
- Built: 1950
- Renovated: 2003

Tenant
- Trikala FC (1963–present) Trikala 1963 FC (2011–2014) G.S. Trikala G.E.A. Trikala G.A.S. Trikala "Zeus"

The Municipal Stadium of Trikala "Christos Papanikolaou - Sofia Sakorafa" (Greek: Δημοτικό Στάδιο Τρικάλων «Χρήστος Παπανικολάου - Σοφία Σακοράφα», Dimotikó Stádio Trikálon «Chrístos Papanikoláou - Sofía Sakoráfa») is a sports stadium in Trikala, Greece. It is used for football matches of the local team Trikala F.C. and athletics events. The stadium frequently serves as a neutral venue for penalised teams and has hosted games between major Greek Clubs in the past. It has also served as the venue for the Athens Grand Prix Tsiklitiria as well as hosted concerts. The stadium has a horse shoe shaped stand with a capacity of 15,000 (seated) and was built in 1950 as a national stadium and one of the biggest in the country at the time.

On 20 April 2024, its name was changed from Trikala Municipal Stadium to Municipal Stadium of Trikala Christos Papanikolaou - Sofia Sakorafa.

== A.O. Trikala ==
The local team uses the pitch as a home stadium since 1963. Many matches with the most successful Greek teams have been played in the field as the team participated several times in the first national league. The record of attendance was set with 18,231 people in 1972 against the runners-up of the 1971 European Cup, Panathinaikos.

== Renovations ==
To host the 2003 Super Grand Prix Tsiklitiria the Stadium was renovated. The locker rooms were of bad shape due to the pass of the years so the City Decided to renovate the locker rooms as well as the football ground. The gyms and other facilities of the Stadium were also renovated but the Stadium is not in its best condition now.

It was also highly debated that Trikala F.C. would construct a brand-new Stadium in 2008 but the team's Relegation to the amateur league made the planning stop. In 2010 the Chairman of the club decided renovate the stadium again by placing stands in the rest of the stadium and rebuilding the Training Ground.

The grounds of Trikala F.C. will be renovated if the team progresses to the Super League in the upcoming season (2011–12). Specifically, the Stadium will become an All-Seater, as it is mandatory, that the part of the stadium that remains unseated, to be seated. Stands will be both blue and red, which are the Club's main colours. The capacity is reckoned to be 15,000.
