= AO Chania F.C. =

Association football club in Greece

A.O. Chania
- Full name: Aθλητικός Όμιλος «Χανιά» Athlitikos Omilos "Chania" (Athletic Club "Chania")
- Short name: A.O. Chania
- Founded: 1945; 81 years ago
- Ground: Monachi Elia Municipal Stadium
- League: Women's Gamma Ethniki
- Website: aoxaniawfc.eu

Athlitikos Omilos "Chania", (Greek: Aθλητικός Όμιλος «Χανιά», lit. 'Athletic Club "Chania"'), is an association football club based in Chania on the island of Crete and was officially founded in 1945. A.O. Chania competes in the Greek Women's Gamma Ethniki.

A.O. Chania has consistently represented the city in various levels of the Greek football league system, most notably the Football League (2nd National Division). The club merged with neighboring club Kissamikos in 2017 to form AO Chania Kissamikos F.C.

== History ==
Since 1970, Α.Ο. Chania have played fourteen times in the Second Division, nine times in the Gamma Ethniki, third tier of the Greek football league system, and twelve times in the (now defunct) 4th Division. The club nearly achieved a historic promotion to the Alpha Ethniki during the 1971−72 season, when they finished 3rd in the Second Division Group A, 4 points behind Group Champions Kalamata. In 1983, the club was relegated from the Second tier, and in 1998 they were demoted to the local Chania FCA A Division, which marked one of the most trying eras in club history.

In the 8 years to come, and until 2006, the club briefly joined forces with fellow local team Panchaniakos, but ended up losing its quality players to the Nea Chora club and themselves relegated to the local B Division. Their decline was ongoing, as AO Chania was demoted to the C Division (lowest regional competition level), even finishing in last place during its tenure there, while in 2004 the club was on the brink of a permanent shutdown and dissolution.

Since then, thanks to a salvation movement led by Chania businessmen, the club began a steady rise to restore its former glory. They merged with neighboring club AO Chania 2004, and in 2006 bought over another local club's AE Chania place in the Delta Ethniki, effectively bypassing three local Divisions in two years. In 2010 the team managed to climb back up to the Third Division, by winning the Cretan-exclusive Group 10 Delta Ethniki Championship during the 2009−10 season, thus making a return to the Gamma Ethniki after 14 years. In 2013, they earned promotion to the Second Division, precisely 30 years after their last relegation in 1983. The club's return to the competition was surpassed by its 2nd-place finish during the Southern Group 2013–14 regular season campaign. Once again however, AO Chania were not able to secure promotion to the Super League in the Promotion Play-Offs, losing the third-place eligibility spot to Olympiacos Volos.

=== Merger with Kissamikos ===
During A.O. Chania's second tenure in the Second Division, neighboring club Kissamikos quickly established itself as a competitor, managing to outgrow, and eventually outperform A.O. Chania. After the latter was forced to relegation to the Gamma Ethniki by the Hellenic Football Federation for failing to renew its league participation certificate, Kissamikos owner at the time Antonis Rokakis proposed a merger of the two clubs in an attempt to form a new, strong outfit to represent the region, and more specifically the city of Chania (as the region's competitor in the Greek Super League, Platanias is based in the neighboring town and municipality of Platanias). The merger was eventually approved on 19 August 2017. The club was renamed to AO Chania − Kissamikos, and according to the Greek laws of football club mergers, would retain Kissamikos' original crest and colors.

== Honours ==
=== Domestic ===
- Delta Ethniki (4th National Division)
  - Winners (2): 1992–93, 2009–10

=== Regional ===
- Chania FCA Championship
  - Winners (2): 1986−87, 1987–88
- Chania FCA Cup
  - Winners (6): 1980–81, 1988–89, 1991–92, 2006–07, 2007–08, 2009–10
- Chania FCA Super Cup
  - Winners (2): 2008, 2010
