= Panegialios F.C. =

Panegialios
- Full name: Panegialios Gymnastics Club
- Nicknames: Μαύρη Θύελλα (Black Storm); Πασάδες του Αιγίου (Pasades of Aigio)
- Founded: 25 February 1927; 99 years ago
- Ground: Aigio National Stadium
- Capacity: 7,000
- Chairman: Elisavet Pikoula-Bobotsiari
- Manager: Xenophon Kazakopoulos
- League: Gamma Ethniki
- 2025–26: Gamma Ethniki (Group 4), 3rd
- Website: panaigialeiosfc.gr
Home colours	Away colours

Panegialios (Greek: Παναιγιάλειος Γ.Σ. (Panegialios Gymnastics Club, referring to Aigialeia, a subprefecture covering the northeastern part of Achaea) is a football club based in Aigio, Greece. Panegialios has a long tradition in Greek football championships and has several appearances in the Greek Super League (former A' Ethniki), 2nd Division and 3rd Division. Additionally the team has reached twice the semi-finals of the Greek Cup competition. Panegialios is one of the most successful and popular teams in Achaea and Peloponnese.

== History ==
The club was founded on 25 February 1927 in Aigio by local selected community members. The man who inspired the idea of the formation of a football club in Aigio was Zisimos Livas. Livas, a well-known architect, together with Nick Gardeniotis, C. Sakellaropoulos, Ir. Anastasopoulos, K. Eliopoulos, K. Liritzis, Chr. Papandianos, etc. have established Panegialios G.S. It is worth to mention that the effort for the formation of a football club in Aigio had begun from Livas in 1924. Until 1927 Livas and the other co-founders have raised money in order to establish the club. Finally in February 1927 they submitted the statute foundation of the club to the local judicial authorities.

=== Nicknames ===
Panegialios nickname since the late-1950s was Mavri Thiella (Black Storm). Also his players called Pasades tou Aigiou because they were very well paid for that era.

=== Greek cup ===
Panegialios has a big tradition in Greek Cup and twice reached the semi-finals, in 1959 and 1981. Both times they lost the qualification in the final from Olympiacos. Additionally the club has reached the quarter-finals twice.

== Crest and colours ==
Like most old football clubs, Panegialios did not initially have any badge displayed on their shirts. The club's crest depicts two wrestlers of Greco-Roman wrestling. It is quite unusual for a football club to have a crest that refers to wrestling but the explanation has to do with Panegialios founder, Zisimos Livas. Livas was a lover Greco-Roman wrestling and had been an athlete of wrestling in Panellinios G.S. So in 1954 after the death of Zisimos Livas, the president of the Club Sotirios Panagiotopoulos in order to honor him, has decided to adopt the club the two wrestlers as a crest. The colours of the team are black and white since 1927.

== Stadium ==
Panegialios home ground is Aeghio Municipal (formerly "National") Stadium which has two stands along the sides of the pitch. The stadium has two almost identical stands, with electronic projectors, a modern canteen as well as a café. The stadium was inaugurated on April 29, 1949. In this location the stadium was formerly a football stadium, with no stands and surrounding arenas and other infrastructure, which was the seat of Panegyalos since its foundation in 1927. In 1983, it was placed on turf and 2011 plastic coating on the arena that surrounds the pitch of the football field. The stadium also had two similar small petals that raised the capacity of over 11,000 spectators. The petals were demolished during its refurbishment in 1985 except for a small section double of the western platform.

The record at the stage was 1963 in a match for the First National Division (Alpha Ethniki), between Panegialios and Olympiacos, with 14,119 spectators.

== Supporters ==
Panegialios F.C. has always had loyal supporters. The first fan club was created during the 1970s. It was called Sindesmos Filathlon Aigiou (S.F.A.) and later changed in Sindesmos Filathlon Panaigialeiou. In 2006 Bianconeri Club has established with strong presence in Panaigialios matches until nowadays.

== League divisions ==
=== League appearances ===
Panegialos league appearances in national divisions since 1958-59. It is one of the few clubs that has participated in all four national Greek divisions.

- Alpha Ethniki - 7 appearances
- Beta Ethniki - 21 appearances
- Gamma Ethniki - 17 appearances
- Delta Ethniki - 15 appearances

=== National ===
- 2012–13: Gamma Ethniki (Third division) (South Group) 1st
- 2013–14: Football League (South Group): 5th
- 2014–15: Football League (South Group): 6th
- 2015–16: Football League: 12th
- 2016–17: Football League: 8th
- 2017–18: Football League: 16th
- 2018–19: Gamma Ethniki (Third division) 12th

== Notable players ==
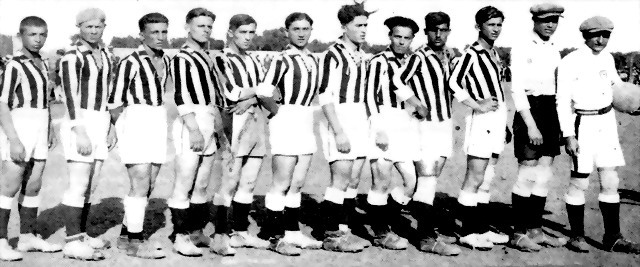
Old team, 1927

- (Argentina) Sergio Espinosa
- (Estonia) Kristen Viikmäe
- (Greece) Nikos Alefantos
- (Greece) Savvas Papazoglou
- (Greece) Grigoris Aganian
- (Greece) Lakis Sofianos
- (Greece) Nikos Karamanlis
- (Greece) Kostas Davourlis
- (Greece) Michalis Kritikopoulos
- (Nicaragua) (Greece) Armando Goufas
- (Greece) Giannis Christofilopoulos

== Honours ==
=== Domestic competitions ===
- Second Division
  - Winners (1): 1961–62
- Third Division
  - Winners (2): 1978–79, 2012–13
- Fourth Division
  - Winners (6): 1992–93, 1994–95, 2006–07, 2008–09, 2011–12
- Achaea FCA Championship
  - Winners (7): 1958–59, 1968–69, 1975–76, 1976–77, 1988–89, 2019–20, 2022–23
- Achaea FCA Cup
  - Winners (4): 1993–94, 2006–07, 2008–09, 2025–26
- Achaea FCA Super Cup
  - Winners (3): 2007, 2023, 2026
