= A.E. Sparta P.A.E. =

Greek football club

Sparta
- Full name: Αθλητική Ένωση Σπάρτης (Athletic Union of Sparta)
- Nickname(s): I Vasílissa tou Nótou (The Queen of the South)
- Short name: AES
- Founded: 1991; 34 years ago
- Dissolved: 2019; 6 years ago
- Ground: Sparta Municipal Stadium
- Capacity: 1,500
- Website: www.spartafc.gr
Home colours	Away colours	Third colours

Athletic Union of Sparta F.C. (Greek: ΑΕ Σπάρτη ΠΑΕ, Αθλητική Ένωση Σπάρτης, Athlitiki Enosis Spartis, Athletic Union of Sparta), also known simply as Sparta was a Greek football club, based in Sparta, Laconia, Greece.

The club was founded in 1991. The football section of the club was the most successful. Playing in Sparta Municipal Stadium, with a capacity of 1,500 spectators.

== History ==
The club was founded in 1991 as Charisiakos F.C. and later renamed as Athletic Union of Sparta F.C. They won the Championship of Laconia in 2001, 2002, 2003 and participated in the Greek Fourth Division in 2002–03 season at the 8th group finishing in 5th place and in 2003–04 season finished in 15th place and was relegated to the Championship of Laconia.

In 2006–07 season, the club was won the Championship of Laconia and was promoted to Greek Fourth Division at the 6th group finishing in 7th place.

In 2013–14 season, the club was very nearly to promoted to Football League 2 but they failed in the last match against Ermis Kiveri which until the 95th minute was 1–1 and eventually finished 2–1 against Athletic Union of Sparta FC. Next season, the club won the Championship and promoted as 1st because of their won against Kyparissia F.C. beating them 3–2 at Peristeri Stadium in Athens. In 2015–16 season, the club finished 1st at the 3rd Group of Football League 2 and promoted to Football League.

== Crest ==
In July 2016, the administration of the club decided to change the emblem after the promotion to the professional categories, recalling the deep roots of the club. The new emblem is a dynamic one, which stems from the history of the city and the philosophy of the ancient Spartans. Dominates the helmet of Spartan officer and on the basis the Greek flag.

== Supporters ==
The fanatics supporters of Sparta were called 300. There was a strong relationship between them and Taranto's fans, where often lift banners in support of the fellow teams.

== Honours ==
=== Domestic ===
==== Leagues ====
- Gamma Ethniki
  - Winners (1): 2015–16
- FCA Laconia Championship
  - Winners (7): 1999–2000, 2000–01, 2001–02, 2006–07, 2009–10, 2013–14, 2014–15

==== Cups ====
- FCA Laconia Cup
  - Winners (7): 1999–2000, 2001–02, 2009–10, 2010–11, 2013–14, 2014–15, 2015–16

== Notable former players ==
- (Greece) Ilias Anastasakos
