= Acharnaikos F.C. =

Acharnaikos
- Full name: Athlitikos Omilos Acharnaikos
- Founded: 1939; 87 years ago as Panthiras Menidiou
- Ground: Acharnes Stadium
- Capacity: 4,450
- Chairman: Giorgos Gkamaris
- Manager: Akis Tzoumerkiotis
- League: Gamma Ethniki
- 2025–26: East Attica FCA First Division, 1st (promoted)
Home colours	Away colours

Acharnaikos Football Club (Greek: Α.Ο. Αχαρναϊκός) is a Greek football club based in Acharnes (Menidi area), Athens, Greece. It was founded in 1939 as Panthiras Menidiou. The club was known as Yperochi Menidi until 1961. It plays in Acharnes Stadium, which has a 4,450 seating capacity. The club's logo is a cloverleaf with two alphas in the left and top and an omicron at the right.

== History ==
The club's history began in 1939 with the foundation of "Panthiras Menidiou". In 1957, seeking to participate in the official championships of the Athens Football Clubs Association, the club's board decided to absorb the charter and name of the club "Yperochi Neapoleos", located in the Neapoli neighborhood of Exarcheia; the merger took place on 1 September 1957. On 22 February 1959, operating under the name "Yperochi Neapoleos", it was renamed "Yperochi Menidiou". In 1961, it adopted its current historic name, "Acharnaikos A.O.", which the club has retained ever since.

In just two seasons (1961–62 and 1962–63), Acharnaikos achieved back-to-back promotions to reach the second division of the Athens Football Clubs Association. During the 1966–67 season, the club earned promotion to the Athens FCA First Division, the association's top tier. After three seasons, Acharnaikos was crowned champion in 1969–70 and subsequently secured a historic promotion to the Beta Ethniki through the promotion play-offs and a play-off match against runner-up Saronikos Aegina.

== Honours ==
- Third Division: (1)

1977–78

- Fourth Division: (3)

1992–93, 1999–00, 2011–12

- Athens FCA First Division: (1)

1962–63

- East Attica FCA First Division: (1)

2025–26

- Athens FCA Second Division: (1)

1969–70
