= 2018–19 Greek Football Cup =

2018–19 Greek Cup

Tournament details
- Country: Greece
- Teams: 73

Final positions
- Champions: PAOK (7th title)
- Runners-up: AEK Athens

Tournament statistics
- Matches played: 118
- Goals scored: 353 (2.99 per match)
- Top goal scorer(s): Giannis Iatroudis (6 goals)

The 2018–19 Greek Football Cup was the 77th season of the Greek Football Cup. A total of 73 clubs were accepted to enter, 16 from the Super League, 16 from the Football League and the 41 previous season local FCA Cup winners. PAOK won the competition for third consecutive year beating AEK Athens 1–0 in the final held at the Olympic Stadium.

== Teams ==
Round	Clubs remaining	Clubs involved	Winners from previous round	New entries	Leagues entering
First Round	73^{1}	41^{2}	none	40^{3}	Greek Local FCA Cup winners
Second Round	53	21	20	1	none
Third Round	47	31	5	16	Football League
Group Stage	32	32	16	16	Super League
Round of 16	16	16	16	none	none
Quarter-finals	8	8	8	none	none
Semi-finals	4	4	4	none	none
Final	2	2	2	none	none

Notes:
1. Originally, 85 clubs were accepted to enter.
2. Originally, 53 clubs were meant to be involved.
3. Originally, 52 clubs would play in this Round.

== Calendar ==
Round	Date(s)	Fixtures	Clubs	New entries
First Round	26 August 2018	20	73 → 53	40
Second Round	5 September 2018	5	53 → 47	1
Third Round	16 September 2018	16	47 → 32	16
Group Stage	5–27 September, 30, 31 October, 1 November & 4–6 December 2018	48	32 → 16	16
Round of 16	8-10, 23, 24 January 2019	16	16 → 8	none
Quarter-finals	6, 7, 26, 27 February 2019	8	8 → 4	none
Semi-finals	3, 25 April 2019	4	4 → 2	none
Final	11 May 2019	1	2 → 1	none

== Participating clubs ==
2018–19 Super League	2018–19 Football League	2017−18 FCA Cup winners		
AEK Athens; AEL; Apollon Smyrnis; Aris; Asteras Tripolis; Atromitos; Lamia; Levadiakos; OFI; Olympiacos; Panathinaikos; Panetolikos; Panionios; PAOK; PAS Giannina; Xanthi	Aiginiakos; Aittitos Spata; AO Chania−Kissamikos; Apollon Pontus; Apollon Larissa; Doxa Drama; Ergotelis; Iraklis; Irodotos; Karaiskakis; Kerkyra; Panachaiki; Platanias; Sparta; Trikala; Volos	AO Kardia; Thraki Feres; Doxa Neo Sidirochori^{2}; Aris Avato; Kavala; A.E. Kalampaki; Apollon Paralimnio; Anagennisi Plagia; ~~PO Nea Kallikrateia~~^{1}; Giannitsa; Megas Alexandros Trikala; Ethnikos Neo Keramidi^{3}; Ermis Amyntaio; Iraklis Polykarpi; Makedonikos Foufas; ~~Pyrsos Grevena~~^{1}; ~~Digenis Neochori~~^{1}; AO Sellana	Oikonomos Tsaritsani; Niki Volos; Thesprotos; ~~Thriamvos Serviana~~^{1}; AE Xyrovouni; Tilikratis; ~~OF Agios Matthaios~~^{1}; ~~AO Kalapodi~~^{1}; ~~APOK Velouchi~~^{1}; AE Messolonghi^{4}; Asteras Itea; PAS Cithaeron Kaparelli^{5}; Chalkida; Kifisia; Ethnikos Piraeus^{6}; Iraklis Elefsina; Thyella Rafina; Pallixouriakos	Korinthos 2006^{7}; Diagoras Vrachnaiika; ~~Asteras Amaliada~~^{1}; ~~Panarkadikos~~^{1}; Ermionida; Kalamata; ~~Olympiakos Gytheio~~^{1}; ~~AO Tsilivi~~^{1}; Aiolikos; Dafni Dafnona; Enosis Vathyllos-Pansamiakos; Thyella Kamari; Antimachos; Paleochora; Episkopi^{8}; ~~PANO Malia~~^{1}; OF Ierapetra

Notes:

1.PO Nea Kallikrateia, Pyrsos Grevena, Digenis Neochori, Thriamvos Serviana, OF Agios Matthaios, AO Kalapodi, APOK Velouchi, Asteras Amaliada, Panarkadikos, Olympiakos Gytheio, AO Tsilivi and PANO Malia withdrew from the competition. Their respective FCA Cup finalists were invited instead, but in each case, did not accept the bid to enter either.
2.Doxa Proskinites, winners of the 2017−18 Thrace FCA Cup withdrew from the competition, and their spot was filled by 2017−18 finalists Doxa Neo Sidirochori.
3.A.E. Karitsa, winners of the 2017−18 Pieria FCA Cup were excluded from the competition, and their spot was filled by 2017−18 finalists Ethnikos Neo Keramidi.
4.Neos Amfilochos, winners of the 2017−18 Aetolia-Acarnania FCA Cup withdrew from the competition, and their spot was filled by 2017−18 finalists AE Mesolonghi.
5.Thiva, winners of the 2017−18 Boeotia FCA Cup withdrew from the competition, and their spot was filled by 2017−18 finalists PAS Cithaeron Kaparelli.
6.AO Karavas, winners of the 2017−18 Piraeus FCA Cup withdrew from the competition, and their spot was filled by 2017−18 finalists Ethnikos Piraeus.
7.Pelopas Kiato, winners of the 2017−18 Corinth FCA Cup withdrew from the competition, and their spot was filled by 2017−18 finalists Korinthos 2006.
8.Ermis Zoniana, winners of the 2017−18 Rethymno FCA Cup withdrew from the competition, and their spot was filled by 2017−18 finalists Episkopi.

== Qualifying rounds ==
=== First round ===
The draw for this round took place on 13 August 2018. 12 teams out of the original 53 did not participate in the draw. The majority of the games were held on 26 August 2018, with the exception of matches 12 and 16, which took place on 2 September.

Megas Alexandros Trikala advanced on walkover.

==== Summary ====
Team 1	Score	Team 2
26 August 2018
Thyella Kamari	2–0	Kifisia
Pallixouriakos	1–0	AE Xyrovouni
Chalkida	0–1	Episkopi
Ermionida	7–1	Dafni Dafnona
Iraklis Elefsina	2–3	OF Ierapetra
Ethnikos Piraeus	3–1	Paleochora
Korinthos 2006	2−2 (5–4 p)	Kalamata
Aris Avato	1–0	Ethnikos Neo Keramidi
Apollon Paralimnio	4–0	Thraki Feres
Ermis Amyntaio	2–1	A.E. Kalampaki
Doxa Neo Sidirochori	0−0 (4–5 p)	AO Kardia
Anagennisi Plagia	4–2 (a.e.t.)	Iraklis Polykarpi
Kavala	0–1	Giannitsa
Oikonomos Tsaritsani	1–0	A.E. Messolonghi
Makedonikos Foufas	1−1 (2–4 p)	Niki Volos
Tilikratis	2–1	AO Sellana
Asteras Itea	0–1	Thesprotos
Antimachos	3–1	Thyella Rafina
2 September 2018
Diagoras Vrachnaiika	2−2 (4–5 p)	Aiolikos
PAS Cithaeron Kaparelli	4–0	Enosis Vathyllos-Pansamiakos

==== Matches ====
26 August 2018
14:30 EEST

Thyella Kamari	2–0	Kifisia
Mavromatis 33'; Zanellari 81'	Report

Kamari Municipal Stadium, Kamari
Referee: Giorgos Fitsas (West Attica)

26 August 2018
15:30 EEST

Pallixouriakos	1–0	AE Xyrovouni
Antonatos 7'	Report

Agios Antonios Municipal Stadium, Lixouri
Referee: Lampros Tsagarakis (Chania)

26 August 2018
16:00 EEST

Chalkida	0–1	Episkopi
	Report	Savvidis 7'

Municipal Stadium of Chalkida, Chalcis
Referee: Dimitrios Psychoulas (Boeotia)

26 August 2018
16:30 EEST

Ermionida	7–1	Dafni Dafnona
Paleopanos 27', 53'; Makridis 35'; Arvanitakis 49', 87'; Tribonias 72' (pen.); Georgakopoulos 90'	Report	Triantafyllou 89'

Kranidi Municipal Stadium, Kranidi
Referee: Spyros Liaros (Laconia)

26 August 2018
17:00 EEST

Iraklis Elefsina	2–3	OF Ierapetra
Katsafaros 50', 90'	Report	Skamantzouras 7' (o.g.); Papadopoulos 32'; Gika 86'

Georgios Roumeliotis Stadium, Elefsina
Referee: Georgios Balachoutis (Piraeus)

26 August 2018
17:00 EEST

Ethnikos Piraeus	3–1	Paleochora
Blanco 15', 82'; Spiliotis 71' (o.g.)	Report	Paliatsios 86'

Grigoris Lambrakis Stadium, Kallithea
Referee: Giannis Kalogeropoulos (Athens)

26 August 2018
17:00 EEST

Korinthos 2006	2–2 (a.e.t.)	Kalamata
Cotov 66'; Kampiotis 100'	Report	Athanasopoulos 5'; Bizos 106'
Penalties
Filis (penalty scored); Kampiotis (penalty scored); Kaplatzis (penalty scored); Manginas (penalty scored); Tribonias (penalty scored)	5–4	(penalty scored) Bitsanis; (penalty scored) Pindonis; (penalty scored) Lathyris; (penalty missed) Kokkalis; (penalty scored) Athanasopoulos

Korinthos Stadium, Corinth
Referee: Vasilios Stamos (Elis)

26 August 2018
17:00 EEST

Aris Avato	1–0	Ethnikos Neo Keramidi
Dontsos 70'	Report

Xanthi FC Arena, Xanthi
Referee: Christos Kakoulidis (Thrace)

26 August 2018
17:00 EEST

Apollon Paralimnio	4–0	Thraki Feres
Meresiotis 26'; Kechagias 29'; Panagiotidis 73'; Boneris 86'	Report

Paralimnio Ground, Paralimnio
Referee: Stefanos Dimitriadis (Chalkidiki)

26 August 2018
17:00 EEST

Ermis Amyntaio	2–1	A.E. Kalampaki
Iliadis 76'; Theodoulidis 78'	Report	Pavlidis 36'

Amyntaio Municipal Stadium, Florina
Referee: Stavros Tsimenteridis (Kozani)

26 August 2018
17:00 EEST

Doxa Neo Sidirochori	0–0 (a.e.t.)	AO Kardia
	Report
Penalties
Gaidas (penalty missed); Lefis (penalty scored); Koutras (penalty missed); Kosiis (penalty scored); Papakonstantinou (penalty scored); Krasonis (penalty scored); Koronakis (penalty missed)	4–5	Penalty scored Penalty missed

Komotini Municipal Stadium, Komotini
Referee: Georgios Georgitsopoulos (Drama)

26 August 2018
17:00 EEST

Anagennisi Plagia	4–2 (a.e.t.)	Iraklis Polykarpi
Tompatzidis 10'; Amanatidis 85'; Tsopozidis 95'; Vasiliadis 120'	Report	Moschos 55'; Milios 65'

Kilkis Municipal Stadium, Kilkis
Referee: Nikolaos Maropoulos (Imathia)

26 August 2018
17:00 EEST

Kavala	0–1	Giannitsa
	Report	Pantelidis 72'

Anthi Karagianni Stadium, Kavala
Referee: Dionysis Stolis (Serres)

26 August 2018
17:00 EEST

Oikonomos Tsaritsani	1–0	A.E. Messolonghi
Moultsias 44'	Report

Georgios Mitsibonas Stadium, Tsaritsani
Referee: Stefanos–Vaios Kalatzis (Thessaly)

26 August 2018
17:00 EEST

Makedonikos Foufas	1–1 (a.e.t.)	Niki Volos
Kalogiannidis 8'	Report	Vukomanović 15'
Penalties
Topalis (penalty missed); Mavromatidis (penalty missed); Takidis (penalty scored); Tzouvaras (penalty scored)	2–4	(penalty scored) Kartsabas; (penalty scored) Meçe; (penalty scored) Tavares; (penalty missed) Papadopoulos; (penalty scored) Anastasiou

Emilios Theofanidis Stadium, Ptolemaida
Referee: Konstantinos Sidiropoulos (Pella)

26 August 2018
17:00 EEST

Tilikratis	2–1	AO Sellana
Peristeris 40'; Giannis Balogiannis 90'	Report	Kontos 75' (pen.)

Lefkada Stadium, Lefkada
Referee: Giannis Panos (Grevena)

26 August 2018
17:00 EEST

Asteras Itea	0–1	Thesprotos
	Report	Bikas 83'

Athanasios Nikokyrakis Stadium, Itea
Referee: Vangelis Lathyris (Phtiotis)

26 August 2018
18:00 EEST

Antimachos	3–1	Thyella Rafina
Thoniatis 16', 89'; Chatzifountas 40'	Report	Charaktidis 71'

Pelion Municipal Stadium, Pelion
Referee: Periklis Parcharidis (Drama)

2 September 2018
16:30 EEST

Diagoras Vrachnaiika	2–2 (a.e.t.)	Aiolikos
Tsirigotis 22'; Triantafyllopoulos 82'	Report	Vezyrtzoglou 48'; Potouridis 68'
Penalties
Georgantopoulos (penalty scored); Stavropoulos (penalty missed); Α. Trigas (penalty scored); Tsirigotis (penalty scored); Ν. Trigas (penalty scored); Triantafyllopoulos (penalty missed)	4–5	(penalty scored) Diamantidis; (penalty scored) Voutsiotis; (penalty scored) Tsompanellis; (penalty missed) Potouridis; (penalty scored) Lalas; (penalty scored) Kaptagiannis

Vrachnaiika Municipal Stadium, Vrachnaiika
Referee: Athanasios Roussos (Corinth)

2 September 2018
17:00 EEST

PAS Cithaeron Kaparelli	4–0	Enosis Vathyllos-Pansamiakos
Tsopanelis 57'; Plakidas 63'; Stamelos 74'; Konstas 85'	Report

Kaparelli Municipal Stadium, Kaparelli
Referee: Marios Pogas (Euboea)

=== Second round ===
The draw for this round took place on 27 August 2018. All Games were held between 5–12 September 2018.

AO Kardia, Apollon Paralimnio, Aris Avato, Niki Volos, Tilikratis, O.F. Ierapetra, Ermionida, Korinthos 2006, Thyella Kamari, Ethnikos Piraeus and PAS Cithaeron Kaparelli advanced on walkover.

==== Summary ====
Team 1	Score	Team 2
5 September 2018
Anagennisi Plagia	0–5	Thesprotos
Megas Alexandros Trikala	0–1	Giannitsa
Ermis Amyntaio	2–1	Oikonomos Tsaritsani
9 September 2018
Episkopi	4–0	Pallixouriakos
12 September 2018
Antimachos	3–1	Aiolikos

==== Matches ====
5 September 2018
17:00 EEST

Anagennisi Plagia	0–5	Thesprotos
	Report	Pentsas 24', 55'; Efthymiou 46'; Bikas 58'; Gogos 79'

Municipal Stadium of Kilkis, Kilkis
Referee: Mattheos Vournelis (Macedonia)

5 September 2018
17:00 EEST

Megas Alexandros Trikala	0–1	Giannitsa
	Report	Iordanidis 87'

Trikala Municipal Stadium, Trikala
Referee: Fotis Polychronis (Pieria)

5 September 2018
17:00 EEST

Ermis Amyntaio	2–1	Oikonomos Tsaritsani
Theodoridis 12'; Tsorlinis 56'	Report	Galanis 88'

Amyntaio Municipal Stadium, Florina
Referee: Meletis Gioumatzidis (Pella)

9 September 2018
16:00 EEST

Episkopi	4–0	Pallixouriakos
Bangura 29'; Ouedraogo 48'; Katsikokeris 71'; Mataragasi 82'	Report

Theodoros Vardinogiannis Stadium, Heraklion
Referee: Marios Viskadouros (Heraklion)

12 September 2018
15:00 EEST

Antimachos	3–1	Aiolikos
Chatzivasilis 32', 81'; Chatzifountas 77'	Report	Vezyrtzoglou 11'

Pelion Municipal Stadium, Pelion
Referee: Theodoros Poulopoulos (Piraeus)

=== Third round ===
The draw for this round took place on 7 September 2018.

A total of 32 teams were involved in the Round 3 draw: The 16 2018−19 Football League teams that entered in this round, and the sixteen winners of the previous round. 16 single-match fixtures were determined, of which the winners qualified to the competition Group Stage. All Games were held between 15 and 16 September 2018.

==== Summary ====
Team 1	Score	Team 2
15 September 2018
PAS Cithaeron Kaparelli	1–3	Irodotos
Antimachos	0–2	Volos
16 September 2018
Thyella Kamari	1–0	Sparta
Ermis Amyntaio	0–3	Ergotelis
Ethnikos Piraeus	1−1 (9–10 p)	Iraklis
Tilikratis	0–5	Aittitos Spata
Episkopi	0–1	Kerkyra
Thesprotos	2–3	Apollon Larissa
AO Kardia	1–5	Apollon Pontus
Korinthos 2006	0–2	Panachaiki
OF Ierapetra	1–0	Karaiskakis
Apollon Paralimnio	0−0 (5–4 p)	Aiginiakos
Ermionida	3–7	AO Chania−Kissamikos
Giannitsa	2–3	Trikala
Aris Avato	1−1 (5–4 p)	Platanias
Niki Volos	1–0	Doxa Drama

==== Matches ====
15 September 2018
16:00 EEST

PAS Cithaeron Kaparelli	1–3	Irodotos
Tsopanelis 16'	Report	Smyrlis 9'; Kasapakis 40'; Fragoulakis 90' (pen.)

Thebes Municipal Stadium, Thebes
Referee: Charalampos Tsoukalas (Athens)

15 September 2018
16:30 EEST

Antimachos	0–2	Volos
	Report	Mantzis 11'; Iliopoulos 70'

Diagoras Stadium, Rhodes
Referee: Aristidis Vatsios (West Attica)

16 September 2018
11:00 EEST

Thyella Kamari	1–0	Sparta
Argyriou 9'	Report

Naxos Stadium, Naxos
Referee: Andreas Vlachos (East Attica)

16 September 2018
16:30 EEST

Ermis Amyntaio	0–3	Ergotelis
	Report	Efford 17'; Iatroudis 58', 68'

Municipal Stadium of Chalkida, Chalcis
Referee: Dimitrios Karantonis (Imathia)

16 September 2018
16:30 EEST

Ethnikos Piraeus	1–1 (a.e.t.)	Iraklis
Manalis 95'	Report	Rovas 120'
Penalties
Makrygiannis (penalty missed); Romano (penalty scored); Skenderaj (penalty scored); Manalis (penalty scored); Smiltos (penalty scored); Leventis (penalty scored); Miliotis (penalty scored); Kornezos (penalty scored); Vlachos (penalty scored); Voutsinas (penalty scored); Romano (penalty missed)	9–10	(penalty scored) Cleyton; (penalty scored) Mendrinos; (penalty scored) Kanakoudis; (penalty scored) Rovas; (penalty missed) Perrone; (penalty scored) Mumin; (penalty scored) Papadopoulos; (penalty scored) Koutromanos; (penalty scored) Dounis; (penalty scored) Vosniadis; (penalty scored) Perrone

Grigoris Lambrakis Stadium, Kallithea
Referee: Angelos Bakogiannis (Athens)

16 September 2018
16:30 EEST

Tilikratis	0–5	Aittitos Spata
	Report	Maroukakis 11', 90'; Matsoukas 14'; Niklitsiotis 40'; Spyropoulos 80'

Lefkada Stadium, Lefkada
Referee: Michalis Matsoukas (Aetoloacarnania)

16 September 2018
16:30 EEST

Episkopi	0–1	Kerkyra
	Report	Theodorakis 9'

Theodoros Vardinogiannis Stadium, Heraklion
Referee: Charalampos Sotiriadis (Lasithi)

16 September 2018
16:30 EEST

Thesprotos	2–3	Apollon Larissa
Stavridis 82'; Lamprou 85'	Report	Lucão 24', 32', 56'

Municipal Stadium of Igoumenitsa, Igoumenitsa
Referee: Spyros Zabalas (Epirus)

16 September 2018
16:30 EEST

AO Kardia	1–5	Apollon Pontus
Stavridis 82'	Report	Pourtoulidis 14', 49'; Kyvelidis 47', 63'; Tsoumanis 78' (pen.)

Neoi Epivates Stadium, Neoi Epivates
Referee: Angelos Angelakis (Macedonia)

16 September 2018
16:30 EEST

Korinthos 2006	0–2	Panachaiki
	Report	Karachanakov 2', 58'

Korinthos Stadium, Corinth
Referee: Fotis Daoulas (West Attica)

16 September 2018
16:30 EEST

OF Ierapetra	1–0	Karaiskakis
Martsakis 4'	Report

Petros Vouzounerakis Stadium, Ierapetra
Referee: Petros Tsagarakis (Chania)

16 September 2018
16:30 EEST

Apollon Paralimnio	0–0 (a.e.t.)	Aiginiakos
	Report
Penalties
K. Triantafyllou (penalty scored); Tsaousis (penalty scored); Lazaridis (penalty scored); D. Triantafyllou (penalty scored); Panagiotidis (penalty scored)	5–4	(penalty scored) Piastopoulos; (penalty scored) Polyzos; (penalty missed) Petrousis; (penalty scored) Proskynitopoulos; (penalty scored) Zannakis

Grigoris Lambrakis Stadium, Kallithea
Referee: Alexandros Tsakalidis (Chalkidiki)

16 September 2018
16:30 EEST

Ermionida	3–7	AO Chania−Kissamikos
Puci 21'; Tribonias 59'; Makridis 90+3' (pen.)	Report	Arnarellis 11', 54', 87'; Riski 37'; Kadima 47'; Apostolopoulos 73'; Gjini 79'

Kranidi Municipal Stadium, Kranidi
Referee: Konstantinos Andrianos (Achaea)

16 September 2018
16:30 EEST

Giannitsa	2–3	Trikala
Pantelidis 62'; Zarogiannis 90' (pen.)	Report	Symelidis 45'; Tsimikas 55'; Golias 57'

Giannitsa Municipal Stadium, Giannitsa
Referee: Fotis Polychronis (Pieria)

16 September 2018
18:30 EEST

Aris Avato	1–1 (a.e.t.)	Platanias
Dontsos 19' (pen.)	Report	Papanikolaou 58'
Penalties
Sichlimiris (penalty scored); Sarigiannidis (penalty missed); Lazaridis (penalty scored); Koutsoubas (penalty scored); Dontsos (penalty scored); Vafiadis (penalty scored)	5–4	(penalty scored) Tárik; (penalty scored) Pozatzidis; (penalty missed) Tsamouris; (penalty scored) Kostikos; (penalty scored) Bianconi; (penalty missed) Kortstam

Xanthi FC Arena, Xanthi
Referee: Konstantinos Poulikidis (Drama)

16 September 2018
18:30 EEST

Niki Volos	1–0	Doxa Drama
Makengo 69'	Report

Pantelis Magoulas Stadium, Volos
Referee: Konstantinos Tsetsilas (Grevena)

== Group stage ==
Location of teams of the 2018–19 Greek Football Cup group stage.
Brown: Group A; Red: Group B; Orange: Group C; Yellow: Group D;
Green: Group E; Blue: Group F; Purple: Group G; Pink: Group H.

The draw for the group stage was held on 18 September 2018, 12:00 EEST, at the headquarters of the Hellenic Football Federation in Goudi, Athens. The 32 teams were drawn into eight groups of four. For the draw, the teams were seeded into four pots based on the following principles:

- Pot 1 contained the clubs finishing 1st through 8th in the Super League.
- Pot 1 contained the clubs finishing 9th through 14th in the Super League, along with the two cubs promoted from the Football League.
- Pot 3 and 4 contained the remaining teams, seeded based on their current league and placement during the 2017−18 season

Teams in each group will play one another in a round-robin basis, with the top two teams of each group advancing to the knockout stage. Match-day 1 matches will be held between 25–27 September, Match-day 2 matches will be held between 30 October and 1 November, while Match-day 3 will be held between 4–6 December 2018.

=== Seeding ===
Pot 1 (Super League)
Team
AEK Athens
PAOK
Olympiacos
Atromitos
Asteras Tripolis
Xanthi
Panionios
Panetolikos

Pot 2 (Super League)
Team
PAS Giannina
Levadiakos
Panathinaikos
AEL
Lamia
Apollon Smyrnis
OFI
Aris

Pot 3 (third round winners)
Team
Kerkyra
Panachaiki
AO Chania−Kissamikos
Trikala
Apollon Pontus
Ergotelis
Apollon Larissa
Iraklis

Pot 4 (third round winners)
Team
Irodotos
Volos
OF Ierapetra
Apollon Paralimnio
Aittitos Spata
Thyella Kamari
Niki Volos
Aris Avato

=== Group A ===
Pos	Team	Pld	W	D	L	GF	GA	GD	Pts	Qualification	ATR	PAS	IRA	THK
1	Atromitos	3	2	0	1	15	3	+12	6	Round of 16		1–2	—	—
2	PAS Giannina	3	2	0	1	7	3	+4	6	Round of 16	—		—	5–0
3	Iraklis	3	2	0	1	6	6	0	6		1–6	2–0		—
4	Thyella Kamari	3	0	0	3	0	16	−16	0		0–8	—	0–3	

Source: epo.gr
Rules for classification: 1. Points 2. Head-to-head points 3. Head-to-head goal difference 4. Goals scored 5. Goals against 6. Play-offs (neutral ground).
25 September 2018
21:30 EEST

Atromitos	1–2	PAS Giannina
Koulouris 76'	Report	Križman 18'; Xydas 40'

Peristeri Stadium, Peristeri
Referee: Stefanos Koubarakis (Thrace)
3 October 2018
16:30 EEST

Thyella Kamari	0–3	Iraklis
	Report	Ziabaris 90'; Panagiotoudis 90+2'; Cleyton 90+3'

Naxos Stadium, Naxos
Referee: Andreas Gamaris (Athens)

1 November 2018
17:15 EET

Iraklis	1–6	Atromitos
Chasomeris 85'	Report	Kotsopoulos 10', 47', 90+3'; Koulouris 59'; N'Sikulu 64'; Manousos 73'

Kaftanzoglio Stadium, Thessaloniki
Referee: Athanasios Sezos (Kilkis)
1 November 2018
19:30 EET

PAS Giannina	5–0	Thyella Kamari
Loukinas 2', 31', 41', 71'; Skondras 68'	Report

Zosimades Stadium, Ioannina
Referee: Evangelos Evangelou (Athens)

18 December 2018
19:30 EET

Iraklis	2–0	PAS Giannina
Rovas 58'; Cleyton 76'	Report

Kaftanzoglio Stadium, Thessaloniki
Referee: Giorgos Tzovaras (Phthiotis)
19 December 2018
17:15 EET

Thyella Kamari	0–8	Atromitos
	Report	Vasilakakis 9'; Umbides 12'; Karasalidis 14'; Mujakic 28', 69'; Šakić 43'; Kotsopoulos 74'; N'Sikulu 80'

Naxos Stadium, Naxos
Referee: Evangelos Manouchos (Argolida)

=== Group B ===
Pos	Team	Pld	W	D	L	GF	GA	GD	Pts	Qualification	AEK	LAM	VOL	APL
1	AEK Athens	3	3	0	0	9	2	+7	9	Round of 16		2–1	—	—
2	Lamia	3	1	1	1	9	3	+6	4	Round of 16	—		1–1	—
3	Volos	3	1	1	1	7	5	+2	4		1–3	—		5–1
4	Apollon Larissa	3	0	0	3	1	16	−15	0		0–4	0–7	—	

Source: epo.gr
Rules for classification: 1. Points 2. Head-to-head points 3. Head-to-head goal difference 4. Goals scored 5. Goals against 6. Play-offs (neutral ground).
25 September 2018
16:30 EEST

Volos	5–1	Apollon Larissa
Mantzis 21', 68'; Coto 61'; Penta 65'; Pitu 81'	Report	Litenas 46'

Neapoli Municipal Stadium, Volos
Referee: Lembros Bekiaris (Karditsa)
12 October 2018
17:00 EEST

AEK Athens	2–1	Lamia
Giakoumakis 73'; Galo 87'	Report	Epstein 64'

Grigoris Lambrakis Stadium, Kallithea
Attendance: 2,000
Referee: Athanasios Tzilos (Larissa)

30 October 2018
19:30 EET

Lamia	1–1	Volos
Karamanos 13'	Report	Roussos 44'

Lamia Municipal Stadium, Lamia
Referee: Anastasios Papapetrou (Athens)
31 October 2018
15:00 EET

Apollon Larissa	0–4	AEK Athens
	Report	Alef 41'; Agiotis 45' (o.g.); Botos 76'; Sardelis 90'

Apollon Ground, Larissa
Attendance: 1,500
Referee: Stefanos Koubarakis (Thrace)

20 December 2018
15:00 EET

Apollon Larissa	0–7	Lamia
	Report	Asigba 10'; Bouloulis 64'; Barrales 67'; Kostikas 69'; Tsoukalos 79'; Romanić 81'; Vasilantonopoulos 88'

Apollon Ground, Larissa
Referee: Manolis Skoulas (Thessaly)
20 December 2018
15:00 EET

Volos	1–3	AEK Athens
Pispas 6'	Report	Morán 4'; Livaja 59', 71'

Neapoli Municipal Stadium, Volos
Referee: Ioannis Papadopoulos (Macedonia)

=== Group C ===
Pos	Team	Pld	W	D	L	GF	GA	GD	Pts	Qualification	PAO	CHA	PNE	OIE
1	Panathinaikos	3	2	1	0	5	3	+2	7	Round of 16		—	—	2–2
2	AO Chania−Kissamikos	3	1	1	1	3	2	+1	4	Round of 16	1–2		0–0	—
3	Panetolikos	3	0	2	1	0	1	−1	2		0–1	—		—
4	OF Ierapetra	3	0	2	1	2	4	−2	2		—	0–2	0–0	

Source: epo.gr
Rules for classification: 1. Points 2. Head-to-head points 3. Head-to-head goal difference 4. Goals scored 5. Goals against 6. Play-offs (neutral ground).
25 September 2018
16:30 EEST

O.F. Ierapetra	0–2	AO Chania−Kissamikos
	Report	Zioulis 48'; Apostolopoulos 90'

Pankritio Stadium, Heraklion
Referee: Konstantinos Katoikos (Athens)
2 October 2018
17:30 EEST

Panetolikos	0–1	Panathinaikos
	Report	Macheda 84'

Panetolikos Stadium, Agrinio
Referee: Manolis Skoulas (Thessaly)

31 October 2018
15:00 EET

AO Chania−Kissamikos	0–0	Panetolikos
	Report

Perivolia Municipal Stadium, Chania
Referee: Georgios Kominis (Thesprotia)
5 December 2018
16:00 EET

Panathinaikos	2–2	O.F. Ierapetra
Chatzitheodoridis 20'; Kampetsis 94'	Report	Hysi 20'; Anastasopoulos 94'

Olympic Stadium, Marousi
Referee: Evangelos Manouchos (Argolida)

18 December 2018
15:00 EET

O.F. Ierapetra	0–0	Panetolikos
	Report

Pankritio Stadium, Heraklion
Referee: Georgios Lambrou (Euboea)
19 December 2018
15:30 EET

AO Chania−Kissamikos	1–2	Panathinaikos
Riski 54'	Report	Emmanouilidis 7'; Vergos 75'

Perivolia Municipal Stadium, Chania
Referee: Aristotelis Diamantopoulos (Arcadia)

=== Group D ===
Pos	Team	Pld	W	D	L	GF	GA	GD	Pts	Qualification	PAOK	ERG	ARIS	AIT
1	PAOK	3	2	1	0	9	2	+7	7	Round of 16		—	1–1	—
2	Ergotelis	3	1	1	1	5	5	0	4	Round of 16	1–2		3–2	—
3	Aris	3	1	1	1	5	5	0	4		—	—		2–1
4	Aittitos Spata	3	0	1	2	2	9	−7	1		0–6	1–1	—	

Source: epo.gr
Rules for classification: 1. Points 2. Head-to-head points 3. Head-to-head goal difference 4. Goals scored 5. Goals against 6. Play-offs (neutral ground).
26 September 2018
16:30 EEST

Aittitos Spata	1–1	Ergotelis
Grontis 80'	Report	Kapnidis 42'

Spata Municipal Stadium, Spata
Referee: Fotis Daoulas (West Attica)
26 September 2018
19:00 EEST

PAOK	1–1	Aris
Pelkas 25' (pen.)	Report	García 45+3'

Toumba Stadium, Thessaloniki
Referee: Anastasios Sidiropoulos (Dodecanese)

31 October 2018
21:30 EET

Aris	2–1	Aittitos Spata
Diamantopoulos 67', 77'	Report	Chanti 90'

Kleanthis Vikelidis Stadium, Thessaloniki
Referee: Vasilis Fotias (Pella)
14 November 2018
15:00 EET

Ergotelis	1–2	PAOK
Iatroudis 68'	Report	Biseswar 11'; Wernbloom 79'

Pankritio, Heraklion
Referee: Stefanos Koubarakis (Thrace)

20 December 2018
17:15 EET

Ergotelis	3–2	Aris
Bourselis 44'; Iatroudis 50'; Efford 53'	Report	Diguiny 57', 74' (pen.)

Pankritio Stadium, Heraklion
Referee: Athanasios Sezos (Kilkis)
20 December 2018
17:15 EET

Aittitos Spata	0–6	PAOK
	Report	Karelis 16', 75'; Cañas 26'; Prijović 63', 84', 85'

Spata Municipal Stadium, Spata
Referee: Evangelos Evangelou (Athens)

=== Group E ===
Pos	Team	Pld	W	D	L	GF	GA	GD	Pts	Qualification	OLY	PCH	LEV	AAV
1	Olympiacos	3	3	0	0	5	1	+4	9	Round of 16		—	1–0	—
2	Panachaiki	3	2	0	1	3	3	0	6	Round of 16	0–2		2–1	—
3	Levadiakos	3	1	0	2	5	3	+2	3		—	—		4–0
4	Aris Avato	3	0	0	3	1	7	−6	0		1–2	0–1	—	

Source: epo.gr
Rules for classification: 1. Points 2. Head-to-head points 3. Head-to-head goal difference 4. Goals scored 5. Goals against 6. Play-offs (neutral ground).
27 September 2018
16:30 EEST

Aris Avato	0–1	Panachaiki
	Report	Moraitis 51'

Xanthi FC Arena, Xanthi
Referee: Savvas Sidiropoulos (Evros)
27 September 2018
21:30 EEST

Olympiacos	1–0	Levadiakos
Manos 68'	Report

Karaiskakis Stadium, Piraeus
Referee: Evangelos Evangelou (Athens)

30 October 2018
17:15 EET

Levadiakos	4–0	Aris Avato
Stanojević 28'; Ioannidis 78'; Liagas 83'; Mitropoulos 88'	Report

Levadia Municipal Stadium, Levadia
Referee: Giorgos Tzovaras (Phthiotis)
1 November 2018
17:15 EET

Panachaiki	0–2	Olympiacos
	Report	Torosidis 39'; Nahuel 70'

Kostas Davourlis Stadium, Patras
Referee: Ioannis Papadopoulos (Macedonia)

19 December 2018
15:00 EET

Aris Avato	1–2	Olympiacos
Sarigiannidis 45'	Report	Vrousai 11'; Androutsos 40'

Xanthi FC Arena, Xanthi
Referee: Evangelos Gratsanis (Trikala)
20 December 2018
19:30 EET

Panachaiki	2–1	Levadiakos
Kynigopoulos 9'; Moraitis 69'	Report	Markovski 77'

Kostas Davourlis Stadium, Patras
Referee: Athanasios Tzilos (Larissa)

=== Group F ===
Pos	Team	Pld	W	D	L	GF	GA	GD	Pts	Qualification	AST	APS	TRI	APP
1	Asteras Tripolis	3	3	0	0	7	1	+6	9	Round of 16		2–1	—	—
2	Apollon Smyrnis	3	1	1	1	7	3	+4	4	Round of 16	—		—	5–0
3	Trikala	3	0	2	1	2	3	−1	2		0–1	1–1		—
4	Apollon Paralimnio	3	0	1	2	1	10	−9	1		0–4	—	1–1	

Source: epo.gr
Rules for classification: 1. Points 2. Head-to-head points 3. Head-to-head goal difference 4. Goals scored 5. Goals against 6. Play-offs (neutral ground).
25 September 2018
16:30 EEST

Apollon Paralimnio	1–1	Trikala
Meresiotis 31'	Report	Tsimikas 42'

Serres Municipal Stadium, Serres
Referee: Mattheos Vournelis (Macedonia)
25 September 2018
19:00 EEST

Asteras Tripolis	2–1	Apollon Smyrnis
Martínez 68'; Valiente 86'	Report	Tzanetopoulos 86'

Theodoros Kolokotronis Stadium, Tripoli
Referee: Alexandros Tsamouris (Piraeus)

31 October 2018
19:30 EET

Trikala	0–1	Asteras Tripolis
	Report	Fernández 33'

Trikala Municipal Stadium, Trikala
Referee: Konstantinos Kotsanis (Drama)
1 November 2018
15:00 EET

Apollon Smyrnis	5–0	Apollon Paralimnio
Bedinelli 20', 49' (pen.), 60'; Pedro 56'; Kontogiannopoulos 72'	Report

Georgios Kamaras Stadium, Rizoupoli
Referee: Evangelos Manouchos (Argolida)

18 December 2018
17:15 EET

Apollon Paralimnio	0–4	Asteras Tripolis
	Report	Tsilianidis 7'; Bastianos 42'; Douvikas 52'; Valiente 59'

Serres Municipal Stadium, Serres
Referee: Anastasios Papapetrou (Athens)
20 December 2018
15:00 EET

Trikala	1–1	Apollon Smyrnis
Kapos 54'	Report	El-Helwe 77'

Trikala Municipal Stadium, Trikala
Referee: Vasilis Fotias (Pella)

=== Group G ===
Pos	Team	Pld	W	D	L	GF	GA	GD	Pts	Qualification	OFI	XAN	NKV	KER
1	OFI	3	2	1	0	6	0	+6	7	Round of 16		—	3–0	—
2	Xanthi	3	1	1	1	1	1	0	4	Round of 16	0–0		—	—
3	Niki Volos	3	1	0	2	1	4	−3	3		—	1–0		0–1
4	Kerkyra	3	1	0	2	1	4	−3	3		0–3	0–1	—	

Source: epo.gr
Rules for classification: 1. Points 2. Head-to-head points 3. Head-to-head goal difference 4. Goals scored 5. Goals against 6. Play-offs (neutral ground).
26 September 2018
16:30 EEST

Xanthi	0–0	OFI
	Report

Xanthi FC Arena, Xanthi
Referee: Giorgos Tzovaras (Phthiotis)
26 September 2018
19:00 EEST

Niki Volos	0–1	Kerkyra
	Report	Kritikos 20'

Panthessaliko Stadium, Volos
Referee: Konstantinos Panytsidis (Kozani)

30 October 2018
15:00 EET

OFI	3–0	Niki Volos
Aravidis 3' (pen.), 30', 86' (pen.)	Report

Theodoros Vardinogiannis Stadium, Heraklion
Referee: Georgios Vreskas (Pieria)
1 November 2018
15:00 EET

Kerkyra	0–1	Xanthi
	Report	Casado 90+3'

Kerkyra Stadium, Corfu
Referee: Alexandros Tsamouris (Piraeus)

19 December 2018
15:00 EET

Kerkyra	0–3	OFI
	Report	Kiliaras 8'; Dinas 13'; Vouho 85'

Kerkyra Stadium, Corfu
Referee: Georgios Kominis (Thesprotia)
20 December 2018
15:00 EET

Niki Volos	1–0	Xanthi
Tzioras 71'	Report

Panthessaliko Stadium, Volos
Referee: Fotis Fotiadis (Kastoria)

=== Group H ===
Pos	Team	Pld	W	D	L	GF	GA	GD	Pts	Qualification	PNN	AEL	APP	IRO
1	Panionios	3	3	0	0	8	1	+7	9	Round of 16		2–0	—	—
2	AEL	3	2	0	1	8	3	+5	6	Round of 16	—		—	4–1
3	Apollon Pontus	3	1	0	2	1	8	−7	3		0–4	0–4		—
4	Irodotos	3	0	0	3	2	7	−5	0		1–2	—	0–1	

Source: epo.gr
Rules for classification: 1. Points 2. Head-to-head points 3. Head-to-head goal difference 4. Goals scored 5. Goals against 6. Play-offs (neutral ground).
27 September 2018
16:30 EEST

Irodotos	0–1	Apollon Pontus
	Report	Dimitriadis 58'

Nea Alikarnassos Municipal Stadium, Heraklion
Referee: Spyridon Kolytas (Lasithi)
3 October 2018
17:30 EEST

Panionios	2–0	AEL
Spiridonović 17'; Masouras 89'	Report

Nea Smyrni Stadium, Nea Smyrni
Referee: Giorgos Tasis (Epirus)

30 October 2018
17:15 EET

AEL	4–1	Irodotos
Nunić 22', 68'; Bargan 56', 63'	Report	Ailton 79' (pen.)

AEL FC Arena, Larissa
Referee: Aristotelis Diamantopoulos (Arcadia)
31 October 2018
15:00 EET

Apollon Pontus	0–4	Panionios
	Report	Alberg 16' (pen.), 67'; Ali 41', 47'

Kalamaria Stadium, Thessaloniki
Referee: Evangelos Gratsanis (Trikala)

18 December 2018
15:00 EET

Irodotos	1–2	Panionios
Damianakis 82'	Report	Tsiloulis 37'; Durmishaj 78'

Nea Alikarnassos Municipal Stadium, Heraklion
Referee: Georgios Kominis (Thesprotia)
19 December 2018
19:30 EET

Apollon Pontus	0–4	AEL
	Report	Leozinho 45'; Kyrkou 30' (o.g.); Žižić 70'; Nousios 71'

Kalamaria Stadium, Thessaloniki
Referee: Georgios Vreskas (Pieria)

== Knockout phase ==
Each tie in the knockout phase, apart from the final, was played over two legs, with each team playing one leg at home. The team that scored more goals on aggregate over the two legs advanced to the next round. If the aggregate score was level, the away goals rule was applied, i.e. the team that scored more goals away from home over the two legs advanced. If away goals were also equal, then extra time was played. The away goals rule was again applied after extra time, i.e. if there were goals scored during extra time and the aggregate score was still level, the visiting team advanced by virtue of more away goals scored. If no goals were scored during extra time, the winners were decided by a penalty shoot-out. In the final, which were played as a single match, if the score was level at the end of normal time, extra time was played, followed by a penalty shoot-out if the score was still level.
The mechanism of the draws for each round is as follows:

- In the draw for the round of 16, the eight group winners are seeded, and the eight group runners-up are unseeded.
  The seeded teams are drawn against the unseeded teams, with the seeded teams hosting the second leg.
- In the draws for the quarter-finals onwards, there are no seedings, and teams from the same group can be drawn against each other.

== Bracket ==
Round of 16
1	Apollon Smyrnis	0	1	1
16	Atromitos	3	2	5
8	AO Chania−Kissamikos	1	0	1
9	AEK Athens	1	5	6
5	Lamia (p)	1	0	1(4)
12	Panathinaikos	0	1	1(2)
4	Xanthi	0	1	1
13	Olympiacos	0	3	3
6	PAS Giannina	1	0	1
11	Panionios	1	3	3
3	Panachaiki	2	0	2
14	PAOK	1	5	6
7	Ergotelis (p)	1	1	2(4)
10	OFI	1	1	2(3)
2	AEL	3	3	6
15	Asteras Tripolis	2	5	7

Quarter-finals
Atromitos	0	0	0
AEK Athens	1	3	4
Lamia	3	1	4
Olympiacos	3	0	3
Panionios	2	2	4
PAOK	1	4	5
Ergotelis	0	1	1
Asteras Tripolis	1	4	5

Semi-finals
AEK Athens	2	4	6
Lamia	0	0	0
PAOK	2	0	2
Asteras Tripolis	0	0	0

Final
AEK Athens	0
PAOK	1

== Round of 16 ==
The draw for this round took place on 21 December 2018.

=== Seeding ===
Group	Winners (seeded in round of 16 draw)	Runners-up (unseeded in round of 16 draw)
A	Atromitos	PAS Giannina
B	AEK Athens	Lamia
C	Panathinaikos	AO Chania−Kissamikos
D	PAOK	Ergotelis
E	Olympiacos	Panachaiki
F	Asteras Tripolis	Apollon Smyrnis
G	OFI	Xanthi
H	Panionios	AEL

=== Summary ===
Team 1	Agg.	Team 2	1st leg	2nd leg
Lamia	1−1 (4–2 p)	Panathinaikos	1−0	0−1 (a.e.t.)
Xanthi	1−3	Olympiacos	0−0	1−3
Panachaiki	2−6	PAOK	2−1	0−5
Apollon Smyrnis	1−5	Atromitos	0−3	1−2
Ergotelis	2−2 (4–3 p)	OFI	1−1	1−1 (a.e.t.)
AO Chania−Kissamikos	1−6	AEK Athens	1−1	0−5
AEL	6−7	Asteras Tripolis	3−2	3−5
PAS Giannina	1−3	Panionios	1−1	0−2

=== Matches ===
10 January 2019
19:30 EET

Lamia	1–0	Panathinaikos
Barrales 52' (pen.)	Report

Lamia Municipal Stadium, Lamia
Referee: Giorgos Kominis (Thesprotia)
24 January 2019
19:30 EET

Panathinaikos	1–0 (a.e.t.)	Lamia
Emmanouilidis 84'	Report
Penalties
Chatzigiovanis (penalty scored); Macheda (penalty scored); Kaçe (penalty missed); Kourbelis (penalty missed)	2–4	(penalty scored) Epstein; (penalty scored) Bouloulis; (penalty scored) Romanić; (penalty scored) Karamanos

Olympic Stadium, Athens
Referee: Anastasios Papapetrou (Athens)

Lamia won 4–2 on penalties.

8 January 2019
17:15 EET

Xanthi	0–0	Olympiacos
	Report

Xanthi FC Arena, Xanthi
Referee: Praxitelis Zachariadis (Macedonia)
23 January 2019
19:30 EET

Olympiacos	3–1	Xanthi
Podence 29', 61'; Hassan 52'	Report	Brito 74' (pen.)

Karaiskakis Stadium, Piraeus
Referee: Georgios Tzovaras (Phthiotis)

Olympiacos won 3–1 on aggregate.

8 January 2019
17:00 EET

Panachaiki	2–1	PAOK
Bastakos 35'; Loumbardeas 68'	Report	Karelis 56'

Kostas Davourlis Stadium, Patras
Referee: Georgios Tzovaras (Phthiotis)
22 January 2019
19:30 EET

PAOK	5–0	Panachaiki
Matos 5'; Jabá 37', 54'; Limnios 46'; Mišić 67'	Report

Toumba, Thessaloniki
Referee: Evangelos Evangelou (Athens)

PAOK won 6–2 on aggregate.

9 January 2019
15:00 EET

Apollon Smyrnis	0–3	Atromitos
	Report	Koulouris 26' (pen.), 63', 71'

Georgios Kamaras Stadium, Rizoupoli
Referee: Ioannis Papadopoulos (Macedonia)
23 January 2019
15:00 EET

Atromitos	2–1	Apollon Smyrnis
Mujakic 7'; Bruno 63'	Report	Varkas 67'

Peristeri Stadium, Peristeri
Referee: Giorgos Tasis (Epirus)

Atromitos won 5–1 on aggregate.

8 January 2019
19:30 EET

Ergotelis	1–1	OFI
Iatroudis 66'	Report	Nastos 28'

Pankritio Stadium, Heraklion
Referee: Georgios Vreskas (Pieria)
24 January 2019
17:15 EET

OFI	1–1	Ergotelis
Neira 44' (pen.)	Report	Boutsakis 23'
Penalties
Sassi (penalty scored); Potouridis (penalty missed); Kyriakidis (penalty missed); Korovesis (penalty scored); Vouho (penalty scored)	3–4	(penalty scored) Iatroudis; (penalty missed) Batzios; (penalty scored) Tselios; (penalty scored) Efford; (penalty scored) Rovithis

Theodoros Vardinogiannis Stadium, Heraklion
Referee: Aristomenis Koutsiaftis (Arta)

Ergotelis won 4–3 on penalties.

9 January 2019
19:30 EET

AO Chania−Kissamikos	1–1	AEK Athens
Riski 90+3'	Report	Ponce 37'

Perivolia Municipal Stadium, Chania
Referee: Anastasios Papapetrou (Athens)
23 January 2019
17:15 EET

AEK Athens	5–0	AO Chania−Kissamikos
Galo 21'; Krstičić 28'; Mantalos 57' (pen.); Livaja 78', 82'	Report

Olympic Stadium, Marousi
Attendance: 1,751
Referee: Alexandros Tsamouris (Piraeus)

AEK Athens won 6–1 on aggregate.

9 January 2019
17:15 EET

AEL	3–2	Asteras Tripolis
Deletić 6'; Žižić 22'; Fatjon 45'	Report	Tsilianidis 43'; Manias 65'

AEL FC Arena, Larissa
Referee: Athanasios Sezos (Kilkis)
23 January 2019
17:15 EET

Asteras Tripolis	5–3	AEL
Žižić 7' (o.g.); Martínez 40'; Valiente 58'; Kaltsas 78'; Fernández 85'	Report	Acosta 52'; Shikavka 60'; Žižić 75'

Theodoros Kolokotronis Stadium, Tripoli
Referee: Anastasios Sidiropoulos (Dodecanese)

Asteras Tripolis won 7–6 on aggregate.

8 January 2019
15:15 EET

PAS Giannina	1–1	Panionios
Križman 13'	Report	Durmishaj 23' (pen.)

Zosimades Stadium, Ioannina
Referee: Vasilis Fotias (Pella)
22 January 2019
15:00 EET

Panionios	2–0	PAS Giannina
Durmishaj 53' (pen.); Saramantas 75'	Report

Nea Smyrni Stadium, Nea Smyrni
Referee: Georgios Vreskas (Pieria)

Panionios won 2–0 on aggregate.

== Quarter-finals ==
The draw for this round took place on 25 January 2019.

=== Summary ===
Team 1	Agg.	Team 2	1st leg	2nd leg
Panionios	4−5	PAOK	2−1	2−4 (a.e.t.)
Atromitos	0−4	AEK Athens	0−1	0−3
Ergotelis	1−5	Asteras Tripolis	0−1	1−4
Lamia	4−3	Olympiacos	3−3	1−0

=== Matches ===
6 February 2019
19:00 EET

Panionios	2–1	PAOK
Durmishaj 74'; Stavropoulos 90+1'	Report	Świderski 58'

Nea Smyrni Stadium, Nea Smyrni
Referee: Aristotelis Diamantopoulos (Arcadia)
27 February 2019
19:30 EET

PAOK	4–2 (a.e.t.)	Panionios
Biseswar 32'; Świderski 83'; Akpom 114'; Vieirinha 119' (pen.)	Report	Durmishaj 34'; Camara 94'

Toumba, Thessaloniki
Referee: Manolis Skoulas (Thessaly)

PAOK won 5–4 on aggregate.

7 February 2019
19:30 EET

Atromitos	0–1	AEK Athens
	Report	Ponce 86' (pen.)

Peristeri Stadium, Peristeri
Referee: Anastasios Sidiropoulos (Dodecanese)
26 February 2019
19:30 EET

AEK Athens	3–0	Atromitos
Ponce 11'; Mantalos 51', 71'	Report

Olympic Stadium, Marousi
Attendance: 5,517
Referee: Anastasios Papapetrou (Athens)

AEK Athens won 4–0 on aggregate.

7 February 2019
17:00 EET

Ergotelis	0–1	Asteras Tripolis
	Report	Rolle 49'

Pankritio Stadium, Heraklion
Referee: Anastasios Papapetrou (Athens)
26 February 2019
17:15 EET

Asteras Tripolis	4–1	Ergotelis
Bastianos 9'; Aravidis 79'; Kaltsas 89'; Fernández 90+3'	Report	Iatroudis 71'

Theodoros Kolokotronis Stadium, Tripoli
Referee: Aristomenis Koutsiaftis (Arta)

Asteras Tripolis won 5–1 on aggregate.

6 February 2019
17:00 EET

Lamia	3–3	Olympiacos
Tsoukalos 9', 62'; Bouchalakis 31' (o.g.)	Report	Dias 12'; Soldano 51'; Hassan 61'

Lamia Municipal Stadium, Lamia
Referee: Manolis Skoulas (Thessaly)
28 February 2019
19:30 EET

Olympiacos	0–1	Lamia
	Report	Tomàs 52'

Karaiskakis Stadium, Piraeus
Referee: Giorgos Kominis (Thesprotia)

Lamia won 4–3 on aggregate.

== Semi-finals ==
=== Summary ===
The draw for this round took place on 8 March 2019.

Team 1	Agg.	Team 2	1st leg	2nd leg
AEK Athens	6–0	Lamia	2−0	4−0
PAOK	2–0	Asteras Tripolis	2−0	0−0

=== Matches ===
3 April 2019
21:30 EEST

AEK Athens	2–0	Lamia
Ponce 63'; Krstičić 90+1'	Report

Olympic Stadium, Marousi
Attendance: 12,325
Referee: Ioannis Papadopoulos (Macedonia)
25 April 2019
18:00 EEST

Lamia	0–4	AEK Athens
	Report	Ponce 36'; Oikonomou 41'; Bakasetas 53'; Vanderson 66' (o.g.)

Lamia Municipal Stadium, Lamia
Referee: Athanasios Tzilos (Larissa)

AEK Athens won 6–0 on aggregate.

3 April 2019
19:00 EEST

PAOK	2–0	Asteras Tripolis
Matos 17', 90+6'	Report

Toumba Stadium, Thessaloniki
Referee: Stefanos Koubarakis (Thrace)
25 April 2019
16:00 EEST

Asteras Tripolis	0–0	PAOK
	Report

Theodoros Kolokotronis Stadium, Tripoli
Referee: Evangelos Evangelou (Athens)

PAOK won 2–0 on aggregate.

== Final ==
11 May 2019
20:30 EEST

PAOK	1–0	AEK Athens
Akpom 45+1'	Report

Olympic Stadium, Marousi
Attendance: 1,040
Referee: Felix Zwayer (Germany)

== Top scorers ==
Rank	Player	Club	Goals
1	(Greece) Giannis Iatroudis	Ergotelis	6
2	(Greece) Efthimis Koulouris	Atromitos	5
2	(Greece) Fiorin Durmishaj	Panionios	5
2	(Argentina) Ezequiel Ponce	AEK Athens	5
5	(Greece) Giannis Loukinas	PAS Gannina	4
5	(Greece) Konstantinos Kotsopoulos	Atromitos	4
5	(Greece) Christos Aravidis	OFI / Asteras Tripolis	4
5	(Croatia) Marko Livaja	AEK Athens	4
9	(Serbia) Aleksandar Prijović	PAOK	3
9	(Brazil) Thomás Bedinelli	Apollon Smyrnis	3
9	(Greece) Vasilios Mantzis	Volos	3
9	(Brazil) Lucão	Apollon Larissa	3
9	(Croatia) Nikola Žižić	AEL	3
9	(Greece) Nikos Tsoukalos	Lamia	3
9	(Greece) Nikos Karelis	PAOK	3
9	(Austria) Armin Mujakic	Atromitos	3
9	(Finland) Roope Riski	AO Chania−Kissamikos	3
9	(Greece) Petros Mantalos	AEK Athens	3
9	(Greece) Alexandros Arnarellis	AO Chania−Kissamikos	3
9	(Brazil) Léo Matos	PAOK	3
9	(Spain) José Luis Valiente	Asteras Tripolis	3
9	(Spain) Marc Fernández	Asteras Tripolis	3
