= List of Greek football transfers summer 2017 =

This is a list of Greek football transfers in the 2017 summer transfer window by club. Only clubs in the 2017–18 Super League Greece are included.

== Super League Greece ==
=== AEK Athens ===
In:

No.	Pos.	Nation	Player
3	(Portugal)	DF	Hélder Lopes (from Las Palmas)
9	(Greece)	FW	Giorgos Giakoumakis (from Platanias)
10	(Croatia)	FW	Marko Livaja (on loan from Las Palmas)
11	(Argentina)	FW	Sergio Araujo (on loan from Las Palmas)
15	(Serbia)	DF	Uroš Ćosić (from Empoli)
16	(Greece)	GK	Panagiotis Tsintotas (from Levadiakos)
21	(Greece)	MF	Panagiotis Kone (on loan from Udinese)
28	(Belgium)	FW	Viktor Klonaridis (from Lens)
30	(Iceland)	MF	Arnór Ingvi Traustason (on loan from Rapid Wien)

Out:

No.	Pos.	Nation	Player
9	(Portugal)	FW	Hugo Almeida (to Hajduk Split)
10	(Venezuela)	MF	Ronald Vargas (released)
11	(Argentina)	FW	Sergio Araujo (loan return to Las Palmas)
14	(Czech Republic)	FW	Tomáš Pekhart (to Hapoel Be'er Sheva)
16	(Greece)	GK	Ilias Vouras (Doxa Drama)
21	(Greece)	FW	Christos Aravidis (released)
23	(Spain)	DF	Dídac Vilà (to Espanyol)
24	(Greece)	DF	Konstantinos Manolas (to Levadiakos)
26	(Greece)	DF	Dimitrios Kolovetsios (to Panathinaikos)
30	(Greece)	MF	Ilias Tselios (on loan to Lamia)
31	(Greece)	FW	Dimitris Melikiotis (on loan to Kerkyra)
77	(Greece)	DF	Stavros Vasilantonopoulos (on loan to Lamia)
87	(Greece)	GK	Giannis Papadopoulos (on loan to Kissamikos)
--	(Greece)	DF	Alkis Markopouliotis (on loan to Kissamikos)
--	(Greece)	GK	Thanasis Pantos (on loan to Acharnaikos)

=== AEL ===
In:

No.	Pos.	Nation	Player
1	(Montenegro)	GK	Mladen Božović (from Zeta)
5	(Greece)	DF	Georgios Kousas (from Panetolikos)
6	(Greece)	MF	Anastasios Lagos (from Würzburger Kickers)
12	(Croatia)	FW	Sandi Križman (from Koper)
16	(Croatia)	DF	Nikola Žižić (from Istra 1961)
17	(Brazil)	DF	Wallace (from Xanthi)
9	(Argentina)	FW	Emanuel Perrone (from Iraklis)
24	(Greece)	MF	Kyriakos Andreopoulos (from Kerkyra)
32	(Greece)	MF	Dimitris Grontis (from Iraklis)
85	(Brazil)	MF	Leozinho (from Iraklis)
99	(Greece)	GK	Alexandros Safarikas (from Veria)
30	(Serbia)	FW	Siniša Babić (from Vojvodina)
27	(Serbia)	DF	Marko Jovanović (from Bnei Yehuda)
--	(Greece)	MF	Panagiotis Ballas (from Panionios)

Out:

No.	Pos.	Nation	Player
29	(Greece)	MF	Kyriakos Andreopoulos (to Trikala)
32	(Greece)	MF	Dimitris Grontis (on loan to Trikala)
2	(Greece)	DF	Charalampos Damianakis (to Veria)
4	(Greece)	MF	Nikos Anastasopoulos (to Lamia)
5	(Serbia)	DF	Borislav Jovanović (to Banants)
6	(Greece)	DF	Manolis Moniakis (to OFI)
7	(Greece)	MF	Andreas Labropoulos (to Apollon Larissa)
8	(Greece)	MF	Vasilios Koutsianikoulis (OFI)
9	(Honduras)	FW	Diego Reyes (to Real Sociedad)
10	(Uruguay)	MF	Nico Varela (to Wisła Płock)
11	(Cyprus)	MF	Andreas Avraam (to AEL Limassol)
12	(South Africa)	MF	Lehlogonolo Masalesa (to Platinum Stars)
15	(France)	DF	Steven Thicot (released)
24	(Latvia)	MF	Jānis Ikaunieks (loan return to Metz)
28	(Albania)	MF	Gertin Hoxhalli (on loan to Kallithea)
32	(Greece)	GK	Apostolos Koutoglidis (to Kallithea)
35	(Greece)	DF	Dimitris Souliotis (to Veria)
39	(Greece)	FW	Dimitris Kapos (on loan to Trikala)
44	(Azerbaijan)	MF	Amit Guluzade (to Səbail)
54	(Brazil)	MF	Dodô (released)
67	(Greece)	GK	Gennadios Xenodochof (released)
96	(Greece)	MF	James Efmorfidis (to Jong Almere City)
97	(Spain)	MF	Pablo Gállego (released)
99	(Spain)	FW	Alejandro Chacopino (to Jumilla)

=== Apollon Smyrnis ===
In:

No.	Pos.	Nation	Player
1	(Croatia)	GK	Ivan Čović (from Inter Zaprešić)
2	(Greece)	DF	Giannis Kontoes (from Atromitos)
7	(Poland)	MF	Bartłomiej Babiarz (from Bruk-Bet Termalica Nieciecza)
9	(France)	FW	Lynel Kitambala (from Union SG)
11	(Netherlands)	MF	Darren Maatsen (from Go Ahead Eagles)
15	(Israel)	FW	Eli Elbaz (from Hapoel Haifa)
16	(Netherlands)	FW	Nassir Maachi (from Nea Salamina)
19	(Greece)	MF	Kostas Mendrinos (from Platanias)
20	(Spain)	FW	Añete (from Levski Sofia)
21	(Argentina)	FW	Gonzalo Castillejos (from Lanús)
22	(France)	DF	Jonathan Bijimine (from Córdoba)
23	(Greece)	DF	Nikos Vafeas (from Agrotikos Asteras)
24	(Greece)	DF	Anastasios Papazoglou (from Panetolikos)
28	(Greece)	DF	Vasilis Vallianos (from OFI)
30	(Argentina)	MF	Axel Juárez (from Nueva Chicago)
55	(Greece)	DF	Alexandros Kouros (from Iraklis)
91	(Greece)	GK	Michalis Zaropoulos (from Xanthi)
77	(Brazil)	GK	Huanderson (from Iraklis)

Out:

No.	Pos.	Nation	Player
2	(Greece)	DF	Xenofon Panos (to Trikala)
5	(Greece)	DF	Georgios Delizisis (to Aris)
7	(Greece)	MF	Paschalis Kassos (to Aris)
8	(Greece)	MF	Nikos Kritikos (to Kerkyra)
9	(Greece)	FW	Dimitris Diamantopoulos (to Aris)
10	(Argentina)	MF	Diego Romano (to Ethnikos Piraeus)
13	(Greece)	FW	Christos Tzanis (to Apollon Larissa)
15	(Greece)	DF	Giorgos Valerianos (to Aris)
18	(Greece)	MF	Antonis Tsiaras (to Trikala)
21	(Greece)	FW	Alexandros Perogamvrakis (to OFI)
22	(Greece)	GK	Dionisis Chiotis (retired)
32	(Greece)	DF	Stratos Chintzidis (to Trikala)
65	(Greece)	DF	Manolis Aliatidis (to Kavala)
93	(Brazil)	FW	Willie (to Servette)
99	(Nigeria)	MF	Christian Obodo (released)

=== Asteras Tripolis ===
In:

No.	Pos.	Nation	Player
1	(Venezuela)	GK	Asdrúbal Chávez (from Atlético Venezuela)
4	(Greece)	DF	Triantafyllos Pasalidis (from Aiginiakos)
8	(Argentina)	MF	Juan Munafo (from Platanias)
9	(Argentina)	FW	Eugenio Isnaldo (from Newell's Old Boys)
10	(Gabon)	MF	Lévy Madinda (from Celta)
20	(South Korea)	FW	Gyeol-Hee Jang (from Barcelona Juvenil A)
38	(Senegal)	DF	Robert Kumadey (from Aspire Football Dreams)

Out:

No.	Pos.	Nation	Player
1	(Venezuela)	GK	Asdrúbal Chávez (on loan to Sparti)
1	(Slovakia)	GK	Tomáš Košický (to Hapoel Ra'anana)
3	(Belarus)	DF	Vital Hayduchyk (loan return to BATE)
10	(Greece)	FW	Nikolaos Ioannidis (to Diósgyőr)
20	(Argentina)	MF	Luis Fariña (loan return to Benfica)
21	(Greece)	MF	Elini Dimoutsos (to Platanias)
29	(Greece)	MF	Giannis Bastianos (on loan to Veria)
35	(Greece)	DF	Ilias Evangelou (on loan to Sparti)
44	(Greece)	DF	Angelos Zisis (to Trikala)
54	(Morocco)	MF	Rachid Hamdani (released)
62	(Greece)	DF	Giorgos Makrostergios (on loan to Sparti)
71	(Greece)	MF	Panagiotis Grosios (on loan to Sparti)
90	(Italy)	GK	Antonio Donnarumma (to Milan)

=== Atromitos ===
In:

No.	Pos.	Nation	Player
1	(Serbia)	GK	Nikola Mirković (from Rad)
3	(Spain)	DF	Joan Oriol (free agent)
4	(Bosnia and Herzegovina)	MF	Azer Bušuladžić (from Dinamo București)
5	(Greece)	DF	Dimitris Chatziisaias (on loan from PAOK)
6	(Greece)	DF	Aristotelis Karasalidis (from Xanthi)
7	(Ghana)	MF	Emmanuel Mensah (from Laçi)
9	(Greece)	FW	Giorgos Manousos (from Platanias)
10	(Egypt)	MF	Amr Warda (on loan from PAOK)
15	(Brazil)	MF	Madson (free agent)
17	(Greece)	GK	Andreas Gianniotis (from Olympiacos)
16	(Greece)	MF	Theodoros Vasilakakis (from Xanthi)
31	(Greece)	DF	Dimitris Giannoulis (on loan from PAOK)
37	(Brazil)	DF	Antônio Polidoro Junior (from São Paulo)
44	(Greece)	DF	Spyros Risvanis (on loan from Olympiacos)

Out:

No.	Pos.	Nation	Player
1	(Greece)	GK	Nikos Papadopoulos (to Lamia)
2	(Greece)	DF	Giannis Kontoes (to Apollon Smyrnis)
3	(Greece)	DF	Athanasios Panteliadis (loan return to Omonia)
5	(Belarus)	MF	Dzmitry Baha (to BATE)
7	(Brazil)	MF	Eduardo Brito (to Apollon Pontus)
9	(France)	FW	Anthony Le Tallec (to Astra Giurgiu)
10	(Argentina)	MF	Martin Tonso (released)
17	(Greece)	MF	Vangelis Platellas (released)
18	(Montenegro)	MF	Miloš Stojčev (to Platanias)
22	(Greece)	MF	Giannis Maniatis (to Alanyaspor)
24	(Greece)	DF	Nikolaos Lazaridis (retired)
29	(Greece)	FW	Dimitrios Limnios (to PAOK)
31	(Greece)	DF	Spyros Gougoudis (to Apollon Pontus)
35	(Belarus)	GK	Andrey Harbunow (released)

=== Kerkyra ===
In:

No.	Pos.	Nation	Player
6	(Greece)	MF	Nikos Kritikos (from Apollon Smyrnis)
8	(Greece)	DF	Aristidis Soiledis (from Omonia)
20	(Greece)	FW	Dimitris Melikiotis (on loan from AEK Athens)
21	(Greece)	DF	Antonis Anastasiou (from Acharnaikos)
25	(Greece)	MF	Sotiris Balafas (from Veria)
31	(Greece)	GK	Nikos Giannakopoulos (from Panathinaikos)
32	(Argentina)	FW	Jonatan Bauman (free agent)
42	(Greece)	GK	Andreas Kolovouris (from Panetolikos)
92	(Portugal)	MF	Fábio Nunes (from Belenenses)
96	(Brazil)	MF	Matheus Vargas (on loan from Audax)
88	(Brazil)	MF	Queven (on loan from Guarulhos)
4	(Cyprus)	MF	Kostakis Artymatas (on loan from APOEL)

Out:

No.	Pos.	Nation	Player
1	(Greece)	GK	Giannis Arabatzis (released)
3	(North Macedonia)	DF	Vladimir Dimitrovski (released)
4	(Nigeria)	MF	David Nazim (to Ankaran Hrvatini)
6	(Greece)	DF	Marios Tzanoulinos (released)
9	(Nigeria)	FW	Ifeanyi Onyilo (loan return to Al-Faisaly)
20	(Greece)	FW	Efthymios Gamagas (released)
21	(Greece)	MF	Kyriakos Andreopoulos (to AEL)
31	(Greece)	DF	Giannis Zaradoukas (to Levadiakos)
77	(Greece)	FW	Konstantinos Georgakopoulos (to Panegialios)
83	(Bosnia and Herzegovina)	MF	Branislav Nikić (to Aris)
92	(France)	DF	Moise Adilehou (to Levadiakos)

=== Lamia ===
In:

No.	Pos.	Nation	Player
1	(Greece)	GK	Nikos Papadopoulos (from Atromitos)
2	(Greece)	DF	Stavros Vasilantonopoulos (on loan from AEK Athens)
5	(Greece)	DF	Thanasis Panteliadis (from Omonia)
6	(Greece)	DF	Dimitris Koutromanos (from Panetolikos)
7	(Greece)	FW	Michalis Frangos (from Sparti)
9	(Ivory Coast)	FW	Patrick Vouho (from OFI)
11	(Spain)	MF	Noé Acosta (from PAS Giannina)
17	(Slovenia)	MF	Matej Podlogar (from Celje)
18	(Greece)	DF	Christos Koukolis (from Agrotikos Asteras)
22	(Greece)	MF	Panagiotis Linardos (from Veria)
28	(Greece)	MF	Ilias Tselios (on loan from AEK Athens)
50	(Ghana)	DF	Mark Asigba (from Olympiacos)
77	(Spain)	MF	Piti (from AEL Limassol)
90	(Greece)	GK	Nikos Melissas (on loan from PAOK)
20	(Greece)	MF	Nikos Anastasopoulos (from AEL)

Out:

No.	Pos.	Nation	Player
2	(Greece)	DF	Panagiotis Spyropoulos (released)
5	(Greece)	DF	Giannis Antonopoulos (released)
6	(Greece)	MF	Michalis Avgenikou (to Rodos)
7	(Greece)	MF	Andreas Vasilogiannis (to Ümraniyespor)
11	(Albania)	FW	Fiorin Durmishaj (loan return to Panionios)
20	(Greece)	FW	Lefteris Matsoukas (to Doxa Drama)
24	(Greece)	DF	Stelios Pozatzidis (to Anagennisi Karditsa)
29	(Italy)	GK	Luigi Cennamo (to Panetolikos)
39	(Greece)	DF	Dimitris Kotsonis (to Trikala)
44	(Greece)	DF	Anastasios Christofileas (to Aittitos Spata)
55	(Greece)	DF	Stratis Valios (released)
80	(Brazil)	DF	André Rocha (released)
87	(Serbia)	MF	Miloš Jokić (to Trikala)
90	(Germany)	FW	Dimitrios Ferfelis (to FSV Zwickau)

=== Levadiakos ===
In:

No.	Pos.	Nation	Player
3	(Brazil)	DF	João Francisco (from São Bernardo)
5	(Brazil)	DF	Leonardo (from Santo André)
22	(Greece)	MF	Nikos Katharios (from Panionios)
25	(Greece)	DF	Savvas Tsabouris (from Nea Salamina)
9	(Brazil)	FW	Brandão (from Londrina)
13	(Greece)	DF	Giannis Zaradoukas (from Kerkyra)
32	(Greece)	GK	Dimitris Sotiriou (from Platanias)
40	(France)	GK	Devis Epassy (from SAS Épinal)
82	(Greece)	MF	Pavlos Mitropoulos (from OFI)
92	(France)	DF	Moise Adilehou (from Kerkyra)
93	(Greece)	DF	Konstantinos Manolas (from AEK Athens)

Out:

No.	Pos.	Nation	Player
5	(France)	MF	Gary Coulibaly (to Bastia)
6	(Greece)	MF	Dimitris Machairas (released)
9	(Greece)	FW	Vangelis Mantzios (released)
16	(Greece)	DF	Antonis Mangas (to Sparti)
18	(Albania)	MF	Qazim Laçi (loan return to Olympiacos)
19	(Greece)	GK	Panagiotis Tsintotas (to AEK Athens)
28	(Greece)	GK	Theodoros Moschonas (released)
29	(Rwanda)	DF	Edwin Ouon (released)
44	(Greece)	DF	Praxitelis Vouros (loan return to Olympiacos)
55	(Portugal)	DF	Carlos Milhazes (to Varzim)
81	(Greece)	DF	Thanasis Moulopoulos (to Aris Limassol)
88	(Ivory Coast)	MF	Lossémy Karaboué (to Valenciennes)

=== Olympiacos ===
In:

No.	Pos.	Nation	Player
6	(Greece)	MF	Panagiotis Tachtsidis (from Torino)
8	(Belgium)	MF	Vadis Odjidja-Ofoe (from Legia Warsaw)
9	(Serbia)	FW	Uroš Đurđević (from Partizan)
13	(Belgium)	MF	Guillaume Gillet (from Nantes)
19	(Croatia)	DF	Hrvoje Milić (from Fiorentina)
21	(Greece)	MF	Manolis Siopis (from Panionios)
23	(Greece)	DF	Leonardo Koutris (from PAS Giannina)
24	(Belgium)	GK	Silvio Proto (from Oostende)
26	(Serbia)	DF	Jagoš Vuković (from Konyaspor)
29	(Nigeria)	FW	Emmanuel Emenike (from Fenerbahçe)
33	(Morocco)	MF	Mehdi Carcela (from Granada)
40	(Belgium)	DF	Björn Engels (from Club Brugge)
53	(Greece)	DF	Spyros Risvanis (from Panionios)
66	(Senegal)	DF	Pape Abou Cissé (from Ajaccio)

Out:

No.	Pos.	Nation	Player
6	(Morocco)	DF	Manuel da Costa (to Başakşehir)
8	(Greece)	MF	Andreas Bouchalakis (to Nottingham Forest)
9	(Paraguay)	FW	Óscar Cardozo (to Club Libertad)
10	(Argentina)	MF	Alejandro Domínguez (to Rayo Vallecano)
11	(Switzerland)	MF	Pajtim Kasami (to Sion)
16	(Greece)	MF	Giorgos Manthatis (on loan to PAS Giannina)
18	(Norway)	MF	Tarik Elyounoussi (on loan to Qarabağ)
19	(Argentina)	MF	Esteban Cambiasso (retired)
21	(Greece)	MF	Manolis Siopis (on loan to Panionios)
22	(France)	DF	Aly Cissokho (loan return to Aston Villa)
24	(Spain)	DF	Alberto de la Bella (loan return to Real Sociedad)
29	(Greece)	DF	Praxitelis Vouros (to APOEL)
31	(Italy)	GK	Nicola Leali (loan return to Juventus)
36	(Brazil)	DF	Bruno Viana (on loan to Braga)
44	(Ecuador)	DF	Juan Carlos Paredes (loan return to Watford)
45	(Greece)	DF	Panagiotis Retsos (to Bayer 04 Leverkusen)
46	(Greece)	MF	Konstantinos Plegas (to Panionios)
49	(Greece)	DF	Spyros Risvanis (on loan to Atromitos)
--	(Greece)	GK	Andreas Gianniotis (to Atromitos)
--	(Greece)	MF	Theofanis Tzandaris (to Panathinaikos)
--	(Ghana)	DF	Mark Asigba (to Lamia)
--	(Greece)	DF	Dimitris Siovas (to Leganés)
--	(Greece)	DF	Dimitrios Goutas (to Sint-Truiden)
--	(Greece)	MF	Dimitris Kolovos (to Mechelen)
--	(Greece)	DF	Konstantinos Tsimikas (on loan to Willem II)
--	(Greece)	FW	Anastasios Karamanos (on loan to Rio Ave)
--	(Greece)	FW	Nikos Vergos (on loan to Vasas)
--	(Albania)	MF	Qazim Laçi (on loan to Ajaccio)
--	(Argentina)	MF	Nicolás Martínez (on loan to Apollon Limassol)
--	(Greece)	DF	Epaminondas Pantelakis (on loan to Kissamikos)
--	(Greece)	FW	Giorgos Xydas (on loan to Kissamikos)
--	(Greece)	MF	Dimitris Tasioulis (on loan to Kissamikos)
--	(Greece)	MF	Konstantinos Megaritis (on loan to Kissamikos)
--	(Greece)	GK	Iason Gavalas (on loan to Kissamikos)
--	(Greece)	DF	Antonis Fouasis (on loan to Kissamikos)
--	(Albania)	DF	Ardit Toli (on loan to Kissamikos)
--	(Greece)	DF	Manolis Saliakas (on loan to Kissamikos)
--	(Greece)	DF	Antonis Karageorgis (on loan to Kissamikos)

=== Panathinaikos ===
In:

No.	Pos.	Nation	Player
1	(Greece)	GK	Sokratis Dioudis (from Aris)
2	(Sweden)	DF	Mattias Johansson (from AZ)
3	(Argentina)	DF	Emanuel Insúa (from Udinese)
7	(Israel)	MF	Omri Altman (from Hapoel Tel Aviv)
9	(Argentina)	FW	Andrés Chávez (from Boca Juniors)
10	(France)	MF	Anthony Mounier (from Bologna)
11	(Ecuador)	FW	Bryan Cabezas (on loan from Atalanta)
14	(Sweden)	MF	Oscar Hiljemark (on loan from Genoa)
18	(Brazil)	FW	Luciano (on loan from Corinthians)
22	(Greece)	MF	Theofanis Tzandaris (from Olympiacos)
26	(Greece)	DF	Dimitrios Kolovetsios (from AEK Athens)
29	(Mali)	MF	Yacouba Sylla (on loan from Rennais)

Out:

No.	Pos.	Nation	Player
--	(Nigeria)	MF	Abdul Ajagun (to Kortrijk)
--	(Greece)	DF	Konstantinos Valmas (on loan to Kallithea)
--	(Greece)	DF	Georgios Servilakis (to Kissamikos)
1	(Greece)	GK	Stefanos Kotsolis (released)
3	(Greece)	DF	Diamantis Chouchoumis (released)
7	(Cameroon)	MF	Olivier Boumal (to Liaoning)
9	(Sweden)	FW	Marcus Berg (to Al Ain)
10	(Greece)	MF	Zeca (to Copenhagen)
11	(Argentina)	FW	Sebastián Leto (to Emirates Club)
12	(Greece)	DF	Nikos Marinakis (to Panetolikos)
14	(Belgium)	FW	Viktor Klonaridis (loan return to Lens)
15	(England)	GK	Luke Steele (to Bristol City)
22	(Ghana)	MF	Mubarak Wakaso (to Deportivo Alavés)
27	(Italy)	DF	Giandomenico Mesto (released)
37	(Greece)	MF	Georgios Angelopoulos (on loan to Ergotelis)
38	(Greece)	MF	Theodoros Mingos (on loan to Kallithea)
40	(Democratic Republic of the Congo)	MF	Paul-José M'Poku (loan return to Chievo)
45	(Greece)	GK	Nikos Giannakopoulos (to Kerkyra)
71	(Greece)	MF	Panagiotis Vlachodimos (to Nîmes)

=== Panetolikos ===
In:

No.	Pos.	Nation	Player
1	(Italy)	GK	Luigi Cennamo (from Lamia)
7	(Argentina)	MF	Franco Mazurek (from Colón)
11	(Uruguay)	MF	Jorge Díaz (from Zaragoza)
18	(Greece)	DF	Vangelis Moras (from Bari)
21	(Greece)	DF	Nikos Marinakis (from Panathinaikos)
73	(Romania)	FW	Vlad Morar (from Viitorul Constanța)

Out:

No.	Pos.	Nation	Player
2	(Greece)	DF	Dimitris Koutromanos (to Lamia)
3	(Greece)	DF	Alexandros Malis (on loan to Neos Amfilochos)
5	(Greece)	DF	Georgios Kousas (to AEL)
7	(Argentina)	MF	Fabián Muñoz (released)
9	(United States)	FW	Ahinga Selemani (released)
12	(Greece)	DF	Anastasios Papazoglou (to Apollon Smyrnis)
14	(Greece)	MF	Grigoris Makos (released)
24	(Greece)	GK	Andreas Kolovouris (to Kerkyra)
28	(Greece)	MF	Stefanos Papoutsogiannopoulos (released)

=== Panionios ===
In:

No.	Pos.	Nation	Player
5	(Greece)	DF	Giannis Kargas (from Platanias)
8	(Georgia (country))	MF	Irakli Maisuradze (from Ermis Aradippou)
10	(Austria)	FW	Srđan Spiridonović (from Admira Wacker)
12	(Slovenia)	GK	Matic Kotnik (from Celje)
20	(Greece)	MF	Konstantinos Plegas (from Olympiacos)
21	(Greece)	MF	Manolis Siopis (on loan from Olympiacos)
22	(Greece)	DF	Thanasis Papageorgiou (from Xanthi)
28	(Iran)	DF	Ehsan Hajsafi (from Sepahan)
29	(Cameroon)	DF	Banana Yaya (from Platanias)
33	(Greece)	DF	Giorgos Saramantas (from Iraklis)

Out:

No.	Pos.	Nation	Player
2	(Greece)	DF	Vasileios Pliatsikas (to Platanias)
3	(Greece)	DF	Christos Tasoulis (on loan to Lens)
5	(Cyprus)	DF	Stefanos Mouhtaris (to Doxa Katokopias)
8	(Greece)	MF	Panagiotis Ballas (to AEL)
8	(Georgia (country))	MF	Irakli Maisuradze (to Balmazújváros)
15	(Cyprus)	DF	Marios Antoniades (to AEK Larnaca)
21	(Greece)	MF	Manolis Siopis (to Olympiacos)
22	(Greece)	GK	Andreas Gianniotis (loan return to Olympiacos)
33	(Albania)	MF	Damian Gjini (on loan to Kissamikos)
44	(Greece)	DF	Spyros Risvanis (to Olympiacos)
64	(Greece)	MF	Nikos Katharios (to Levadiakos)

=== PAOK ===
In:

No.	Pos.	Nation	Player
1	(Argentina)	GK	Rodrigo Rey (from Godoy Cruz)
2	(Peru)	DF	Carlos Zambrano (on loan from Rubin Kazan)
6	(France)	DF	Dorian Lévêque (from Guingamp)
7	(Morocco)	MF	Omar El Kaddouri (from Empoli)
8	(Brazil)	MF	Maurício (from Zenit Saint Petersburg)
18	(Greece)	FW	Dimitrios Limnios (from Atromitos)
29	(Slovakia)	FW	Róbert Mak (on loan from Zenit Saint Petersburg)
31	(Greece)	GK	Alexandros Paschalakis (from PAS Giannina)
88	(Portugal)	MF	Vieirinha (from VfL Wolfsburg)

Out:

No.	Pos.	Nation	Player
5	(Greece)	DF	Dimitris Chatziisaias (on loan to Atromitos)
7	(Egypt)	MF	Amr Warda (on loan to Atromitos)
8	(Greece)	MF	Charis Charisis (on loan to Sint-Truiden)
11	(Brazil)	FW	Pedro Henrique (on loan to Qarabağ)
14	(Argentina)	FW	Facundo Pereyra (to Necaxa)
30	(Greece)	GK	Nikos Melissas (on loan to Lamia)
31	(Greece)	DF	Dimitris Giannoulis (on loan to Atromitos)
33	(Greece)	FW	Stefanos Athanasiadis (to Maccabi Haifa)
34	(Greece)	MF	Nikos Korovesis (to Platanias)
37	(Albania)	DF	Kristi Qose (to Ružomberok)
38	(Greece)	MF	Aristotelis Panagiotidis (to Iraklis)
40	(Cyprus)	FW	Nikolas Mattheou (on loan to Anorthosis Famagusta)
52	(Slovakia)	MF	Erik Sabo (on loan to Beitar Jerusalem)
60	(Greece)	FW	Giorgos Kakko (on loan to Nea Salamina)
70	(Greece)	DF	Stelios Kitsiou (on loan to Sint-Truiden)
92	(France)	MF	Sakis Theodoropoulos (on loan to AEL)
93	(Australia)	MF	Terry Antonis (to Venlo)
98	(Greece)	MF	Manolis Patralis (on loan to Platanias)
51	(Greece)	GK	Rafail Soilemezoglou (to Veria)
19	(Brazil)	FW	Jairo (on loan to Sheriff Tiraspol)
91	(Greece)	DF	Fotis Pantekidis (on loan to Makedonikos)
56	(Greece)	DF	Savvas Toumanidis (on loan to Makedonikos)
54	(Greece)	MF	Sokratis Kyrillidis (on loan to Pierikos)
68	(Serbia)	FW	Bogdan Rangelov (on loan to Doxa Drama)
69	(Russia)	FW	Aleksandr Bataev (to Anzhi Makhachkala)
65	(Greece)	MF	Giorgos Ktistopoulos (to Pierikos)

=== PAS Giannina ===
In:

No.	Pos.	Nation	Player
10	(Brazil)	MF	Bruno Chalkiadakis (from Cascavel)
14	(Argentina)	FW	Jonathan Rodríguez (from Chacarita)
16	(Greece)	GK	Theodoros Venetikidis (from Veria)
23	(Greece)	MF	Lampros Zacharos (from Acharnaikos)
26	(Greece)	DF	Vasilis Zogos (from Ifaistos Peristeriou)
39	(Greece)	GK	Markos Vellidis (free agent)
40	(Greece)	GK	Serafeim Giannikoglou (from Iraklis)
64	(France)	FW	Franck Betra (from Sheffield Wednesday Academy)
77	(Greece)	DF	Alexis Apostolopoulos (from Platanias)
--	(Algeria)	FW	Karim Soltani (from Xanthi)
--	(Greece)	FW	Giorgos Manthatis (on loan from Olympiacos)

Out:

No.	Pos.	Nation	Player
1	(Greece)	GK	Alexandros Paschalakis (to PAOK)
10	(Brazil)	FW	Jairo (loan return to PAOK)
11	(Spain)	MF	Noé Acosta (to Lamia)
13	(Greece)	GK	Nikolaos Koliofoukas (to Kilkisiakos)
23	(Greece)	DF	Leonardo Koutris (to Olympiacos)
34	(Greece)	MF	Nikos Korovesis (loan return to PAOK)
93	(Republic of the Congo)	FW	Christopher Maboulou (released)
98	(Greece)	FW	Alexandros Masouras (to Anagennisi Karditsa)

=== Platanias ===
In:

No.	Pos.	Nation	Player
6	(France)	DF	Pierrick Cros (from Red Star)
7	(Ukraine)	FW	Yevhen Budnik (from Kapfenberger SV)
8	(Greece)	DF	Vasileios Pliatsikas (from Panionios)
9	(Poland)	FW	Piotr Grzelczak (from Górnik Łęczna)
10	(Democratic Republic of the Congo)	FW	Clarck N'Sikulu (from Stade Laval)
14	(Greece)	MF	Manolis Patralis (on loan from PAOK)
17	(Republic of the Congo)	DF	Clévid Dikamona (from Bourg-Péronnas)
20	(Greece)	MF	Vasilis Angelopoulos (from Iraklis)
30	(France)	GK	David Oberhauser (from Metz)
33	(Greece)	MF	Nikos Korovesis (from PAOK)
55	(Greece)	DF	Dimitris Stamou (from Iraklis)
11	(Montenegro)	MF	Miloš Stojčev (from Atromitos)
40	(Greece)	MF	Elini Dimoutsos (from Asteras Tripolis)

Out:

No.	Pos.	Nation	Player
3	(Greece)	DF	Giannis Kargas (to Panionios)
7	(Greece)	MF	Kostas Mendrinos (to Apollon Smyrnis)
8	(Argentina)	MF	Juan Munafo (to Asteras Tripolis)
9	(Greece)	FW	Georgios Manousos (to Atromitos)
10	(Belarus)	FW	Mikalay Signevich (loan return to BATE)
11	(Greece)	FW	Giorgos Giakoumakis (to AEK Athens)
20	(Greece)	MF	Fanouris Goundoulakis (released)
22	(Cameroon)	DF	Banana Yaya (to Panionios)
23	(Spain)	DF	Raúl Llorente (to Western Sydney Wanderers)
26	(Greece)	MF	Thanasis Dinas (to Trikala)
32	(Greece)	GK	Dimitris Sotiriou (to Levadiakos)
55	(Greece)	DF	Stelios Marangos (to Aris)
77	(Greece)	DF	Alexis Apostolopoulos (to PAS Giannina)

=== Xanthi ===
In:

No.	Pos.	Nation	Player
18	(Argentina)	FW	Matías Gastón Castro (from San Marcos de Arica)
19	(Equatorial Guinea)	FW	Kike (from Kissamikos)
22	(Croatia)	MF	Goran Roce (from Istra 1961)
26	(Slovakia)	FW	Erik Jendrišek (from Cracovia)
32	(Spain)	DF	Jorge Casado (from Real Zaragoza)
40	(Greece)	GK	Giorgos Tzelepis (free agent)
77	(Portugal)	FW	Brito (from Maritimo)

Out:

No.	Pos.	Nation	Player
2	(Greece)	DF	Thanasis Papageorgiou (to Panionios)
4	(Greece)	DF	Aristotelis Karasalidis (to Atromitos)
9	(Tunisia)	FW	Hamza Younés (to BB Erzurumspor)
10	(Algeria)	FW	Karim Soltani (to PAS Giannina)
16	(Greece)	MF	Theodoros Vasilakakis (to Atromitos)
17	(Brazil)	DF	Wallace (to AEL)
19	(Greece)	FW	Antonis Ranos (to Sparti)
22	(Serbia)	MF	Đorđe Lazić (released)
25	(Armenia)	MF	Marcos Pizzelli (to Al-Shabab)
48	(Greece)	GK	Manolis Demenikos (to Panserraikos)
71	(Greece)	MF	Manolis Papasterianos (to OFI)
91	(Greece)	GK	Michalis Zaropoulos (to Apollon Smyrnis)
97	(Greece)	FW	Rafail Melissopoulos (on loan to Volos)
