= Tsimikas =

Tsimikas is a surname. Notable people with the surname include:

- Kostas Tsimikas (born 1996), Greek footballer
- Stergios Tsimikas (born 1994), Greek footballer
