= Chrysostomos Revythopoulos =

Greek footballer

Personal information
- Date of birth: 19 December 1995 (age 30)
- Place of birth: Drama, Greece
- Height: 1.75 m (5 ft 9 in)
- Position: Right-back

Youth career
- 2009–2011: Kavala

Senior career*
Years	Team	Apps	(Gls)
2011–2014	Kavala	46	(0)
2014–2015	Fokikos	11	(0)
2015–2019	Doxa Drama	52	(0)
2017–2018	→ Iraklis (loan)	23	(0)
2019–2020	Platanias	14	(0)
2020–2021	Rodos	12	(0)
2021–2022	Apollon Paralimnio		
- * Club domestic league appearances and goals as of 19 June 2021

Chrysostomos Revythopoulos (Greek: Χρυσόστομος Ρεβυθόπουλος; born 19 December 1995) is a Greek professional footballer who plays as a right-back.

== Honours ==
Iraklis

- Gamma Ethniki: 2017–18
