= Rovas =

Rovas (Greek: Ροβας) is a Greek surname. Notable people with this name include:

- Christos Rovas (1994), Greek professional footballer
- Nikos Rovas (1977), Greek former professional tennis player

== See also ==
- Rovas script
