= José Luis Valiente =

Spanish footballer

Personal information
- Full name: José Luis Valiente Giménez
- Date of birth: 18 May 1991 (age 35)
- Place of birth: Valencia, Spain
- Height: 1.84 m (6 ft 0 in)
- Position: Midfielder

Youth career
- Valencia
- 2007–2010: Alicante

Senior career*
Years	Team	Apps	(Gls)
2010–2011	Alicante B		
2011–2014	Alzira	68	(3)
2014–2015	Olímpic Xàtiva	33	(3)
2015–2016	Levante B	34	(0)
2016–2018	Lleida Esportiu	79	(0)
2018–2024	Asteras Tripolis	127	(3)
- * Club domestic league appearances and goals as of 21 May 2024

José Luis Valiente Giménez (born 18 May 1991) is a Spanish professional footballer who plays as a midfielder.

== Career ==
Born in Alzira, Valencia, Valiente finished his formation with Alicante CF, making his senior debut with the reserves in the 2010–11 season, in Tercera División. He went on to represent UD Alzira in the same tier before joining Segunda División B club CD Olímpic de Xàtiva on 26 July 2014.

On 8 July 2015, Valiente agreed to a contract with Levante UD and was assigned to the B-team also in the third division. On 19 July 2016, he moved to fellow league team Lleida Esportiu, and made his debut for the latter on 21 August by playing the full 90 minutes of a 0–1 defeat against CF Badalona.

On 1 June 2018, after two full seasons as a starter with Lleida, Valiente terminated his contract. He moved abroad three days later, joining Greek club Asteras Tripolis FC after agreeing to a three-year deal. He made his professional debut on 2 August, starting in a 1–1 draw against Scottish club Hibernian FC in the UEFA Europa League.

Valiente scored his first professional goal on 25 September 2018, in a 2–1 home win against Apollon Smyrnis FC for the season's Greek Cup. His first league goal came on 22 October, in a 2–3 loss at Atromitos FC.

== Career statistics ==
As of match played on 24 January 2022

Club	Season	League			Cup		Continental		Total	
Club	Season	Division	Apps	Goals	Apps	Goals	Apps	Goals	Apps	Goals
Olímpic Xàtiva	2014–15	Segunda División B	33	3	0	0	—		33	3
Levante B	2015–16	Segunda División B	34	0	—		—		34	0
Lleida Esportiu	2016–17	Segunda División B	36	0	2	0	—		38	0
Lleida Esportiu	2017–18	Segunda División B	35	0	6	0	—		41	0
Lleida Esportiu	Total		71	0	8	0	—		79	0
Asteras Tripolis	2018–19	Super League Greece	25	2	8	3	1 (Note: Appearances in UEFA Europa League)	0	34	5
Asteras Tripolis	2019–20	Super League Greece	27	0	1	0	—		28	0
Asteras Tripolis	2020–21	Super League Greece	32	0	2	0	—		34	0
Asteras Tripolis	2021–22	Super League Greece	17	1	1	0	—		18	1
Asteras Tripolis	Total		101	3	12	3	1	0	114	6
Career total			239	5	20	3	1	0	260	9
