= Srđan Spiridonović =

Austrian footballer

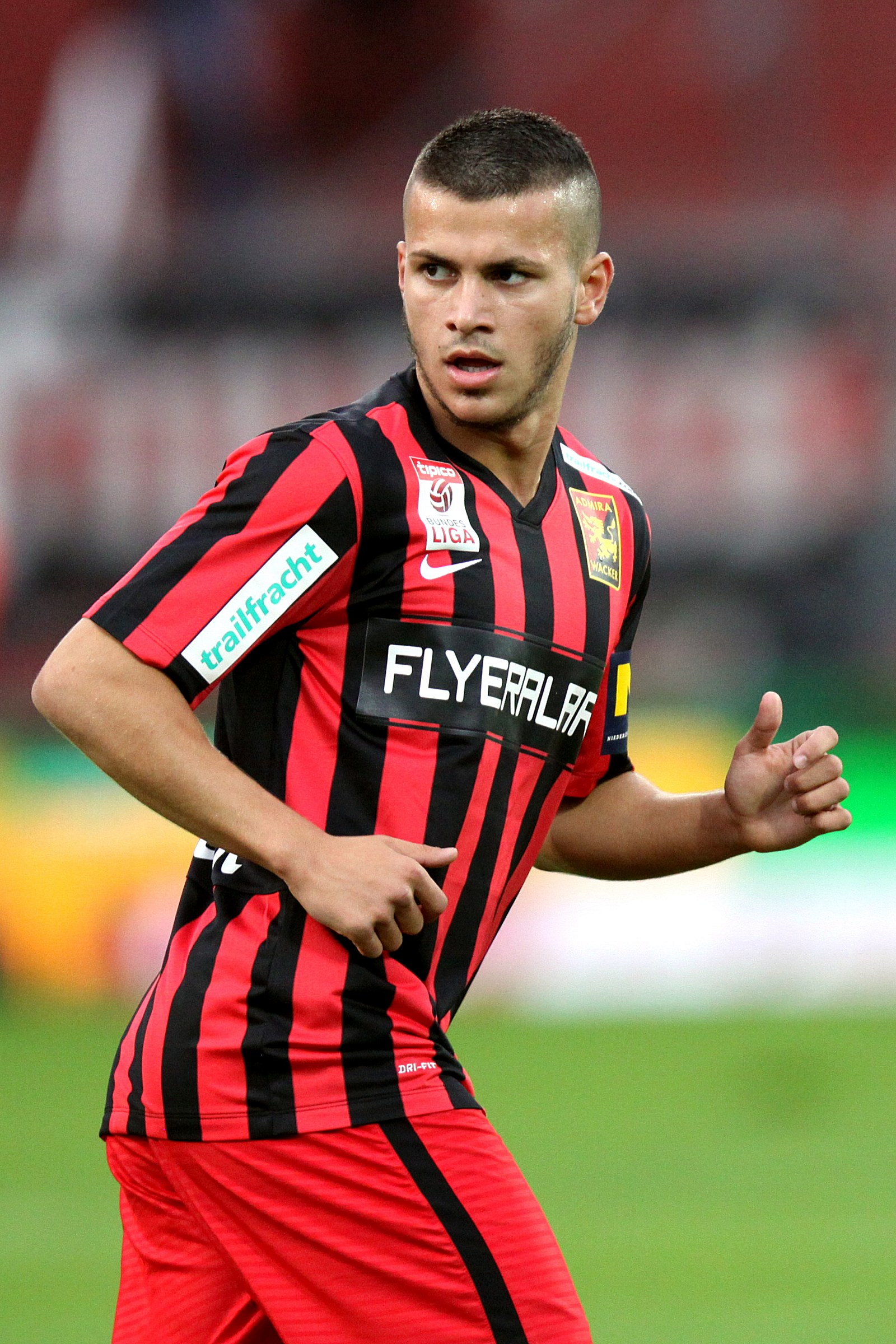
- Spiridonović in 2015

Personal information
- Date of birth: 13 October 1993 (age 33)
- Place of birth: Vienna, Austria
- Height: 1.73 m (5 ft 8 in)
- Position: Winger

Team information
- Current team: Smederevo 1924
- Number: 10

Youth career
- 2002–2009: Rapid Vienna
- 2009–2011: Austria Vienna

Senior career*
Years	Team	Apps	(Gls)
2011–2014	Austria Vienna	7	(0)
2011–2014	→ Austria Vienna II	70	(28)
2014–2015	Vicenza	8	(0)
2015	→ Messina (loan)	7	(1)
2015–2017	Admira Wacker Mödling	44	(7)
2017–2019	Panionios	44	(10)
2019–2020	Pogoń Szczecin	23	(6)
2020–2022	Red Star Belgrade	16	(3)
2021	→ Gençlerbirliği (loan)	6	(0)
2021–2022	→ Atromitos (loan)	20	(2)
2023	Kauno Žalgiris	12	(0)
2023	Hajer	7	(0)
2024	Al-Salmiya		
2024	Mura	7	(1)
2025	Chania	8	(1)
2026–	Smederevo 1924	13	(4)

International career
2011–2012	Austria U19	10	(4)
2012–2013	Austria U21	4	(0)
- * Club domestic league appearances and goals as of 14 May 2026

Srđan Spiridonović (German: Srdjan Spiridonovic, Serbian Cyrillic: Срђан Спиридоновић; born 13 October 1993) is an Austrian professional footballer who plays as a left winger for Serbian First League club Smederevo 1924.

== Career ==
Born in Vienna into a family of Serbian descent, Spiridonović started his career at Austria Vienna. In summer 2014, he was signed by Italian Lega Pro club Vicenza. The club was accidentally selected to replace AC Siena in at the start of Serie B season. He wore no.11 shirt. On 29 January 2015 Spiridonović was farmed to Lega Pro club Messina in a temporary deal. His no.11 was also taken by Leonardo Spinazzola. In the next season he changed to wear no.20 shirt.

On 28 August 2015 he was signed by Admira Wacker Mödling for free.

=== Panionios ===
On 29 August 2017, he joined Super League Greece side Panionios for 3 years, days after being released from Admira. On 21 September 2017 he scored his first goal in 1–1 home win against PAS Giannina in the 2017–18 Greek Cup. Three days later he scored the third of four in a comfortable 4–1 win against AEL. On 14 October he opened the score in a dramatic 4–3 home loss against Olympiacos. On 26 November, he scored the second goal giving the lead in a 2–2 home draw with rivals PAOK. On 9 December he scored in a 2–1 home win against Platanias. On 9 January 2018 he scored the only goal in an away Greek Cup win against OFI, which ensured his team's qualification for the quarter-finals. On 10 March 2018, Spiridonovic scored two second-half goals (48', 59') for experienced manager Michalis Grigoriou's team in a 2–2 home draw with Atromitos. On 29 April, Spiridonovic scored two second-half goals in a 2–1 away win against Platanias.

On 3 October 2018, he opened the score in a 2–0 home win against AEL in the 2018–19 Greek Cup. Following a brilliant scoring 2017–18 Super League Greece season, Spiridonović scored his first goal of the 2018–19 season on 24 February 2019, taking advantage of an assist from Fiorin Durmishaj on the right wing, slotting a low effort beyond Sokratis Dioudis in a 2–0 home win against Panathinaikos in his club's effort to avoid relegation. On 21 April 2019, he scored with a tap-in after a cross from Olivier Boumal, to seal a 2–1 home win against PAS Giannina.

=== Pogoń Szczecin ===
On 4 July 2019, he joined Ekstraklasa side Pogoń Szczecin after being released from Panionios for an undisclosed fee.

=== Red Star Belgrade ===
On 23 June 2020 he signed a 3-year contract with Serbian champions Red Star Belgrade. On 25 January 2021 he was loaned to Turkish side Gençlerbirliği on a six-month loan.

On 6 August 2021, he returned to the Super League Greece, joining Atromitos on a season long-loan. The deal also includes an option to buy.

=== Kauno Žalgiris ===
On 3 March 2023, Spiridonović signed for Lithuanian A Lyga club Kauno Žalgiris.

=== Hajer ===
On 16 July 2023, Spiridonović joined Saudi First Division club Hajer.

=== Al-Salmiya ===
On 31 January 2024, Spiridonović joined Kuwait Premier League club Al-Salmiya.

== Honours ==
Austria Wien

- Austrian Bundesliga: 2012–13
