= Konstantinos Tsamouris =

Greek footballer (born 1994)

Personal information
- Date of birth: 14 November 1994 (age 31)
- Place of birth: Kavala, Greece
- Height: 1.87 m (6 ft 2 in)
- Position: Centre-back

Team information
- Current team: Xanthi

Youth career
- Skoda Xanthi

Senior career*
Years	Team	Apps	(Gls)
2012–2015	Skoda Xanthi	0	(0)
2014–2015	→ Lamia (loan)	13	(0)
2015–2016	Lamia	14	(0)
2016–2017	1. FC Kaiserslautern II	18	(0)
2017–2018	Panserraikos	17	(0)
2018–2020	Platanias	47	(2)
2020–2021	Xanthi	14	(0)
2021–2022	Chania	24	(1)
2022–2023	Apollon Smyrnis	13	(0)
2023–2024	Makedonikos	12	(1)
2024–2025	Kavala	23	(0)
2025–2026	Nestos Chrysoupoli	24	(0)
2026–	Xanthi		

International career^{‡}
2012	Greece U19	1	(0)
- * Club domestic league appearances and goals as of 20 April 2026 ‡ National team caps and goals as of 7 September 2012

Konstantinos Tsamouris (Greek: Κωνσταντίνος Τσαμούρης; born 14 November 1994) is a Greek professional footballer who plays as a centre-back for Gamma Ethniki club Xanthi.
