= Michalis Zaropoulos =

Greek footballer

Personal information
- Full name: Michail Zaropoulos
- Date of birth: 12 July 1991 (age 35)
- Place of birth: Trikala, Greece
- Height: 1.84 m (6 ft 0 in)
- Position: Goalkeeper

Team information
- Current team: Trikala
- Number: 1

Senior career*
Years	Team	Apps	(Gls)
2010–2017	Skoda Xanthi	17	(0)
2012–2013	→ Kalamata (loan)	5	(0)
2017–2018	Apollon Smyrnis	0	(0)
2018–2019	Meteora		
2019–2020	Trikala	9	(0)
- * Club domestic league appearances and goals

Michalis Zaropoulos (Greek: Μιχάλης Ζαρόπουλος; born 12 July 1991) is a Greek professional footballer who plays as a goalkeeper for Football League club Trikala.

== Career ==
=== Trikala ===
On 27 June 2019, Zaropoulos joined Trikala on a 1-year deal.
