= Nikola Žižić =

Croatian footballer

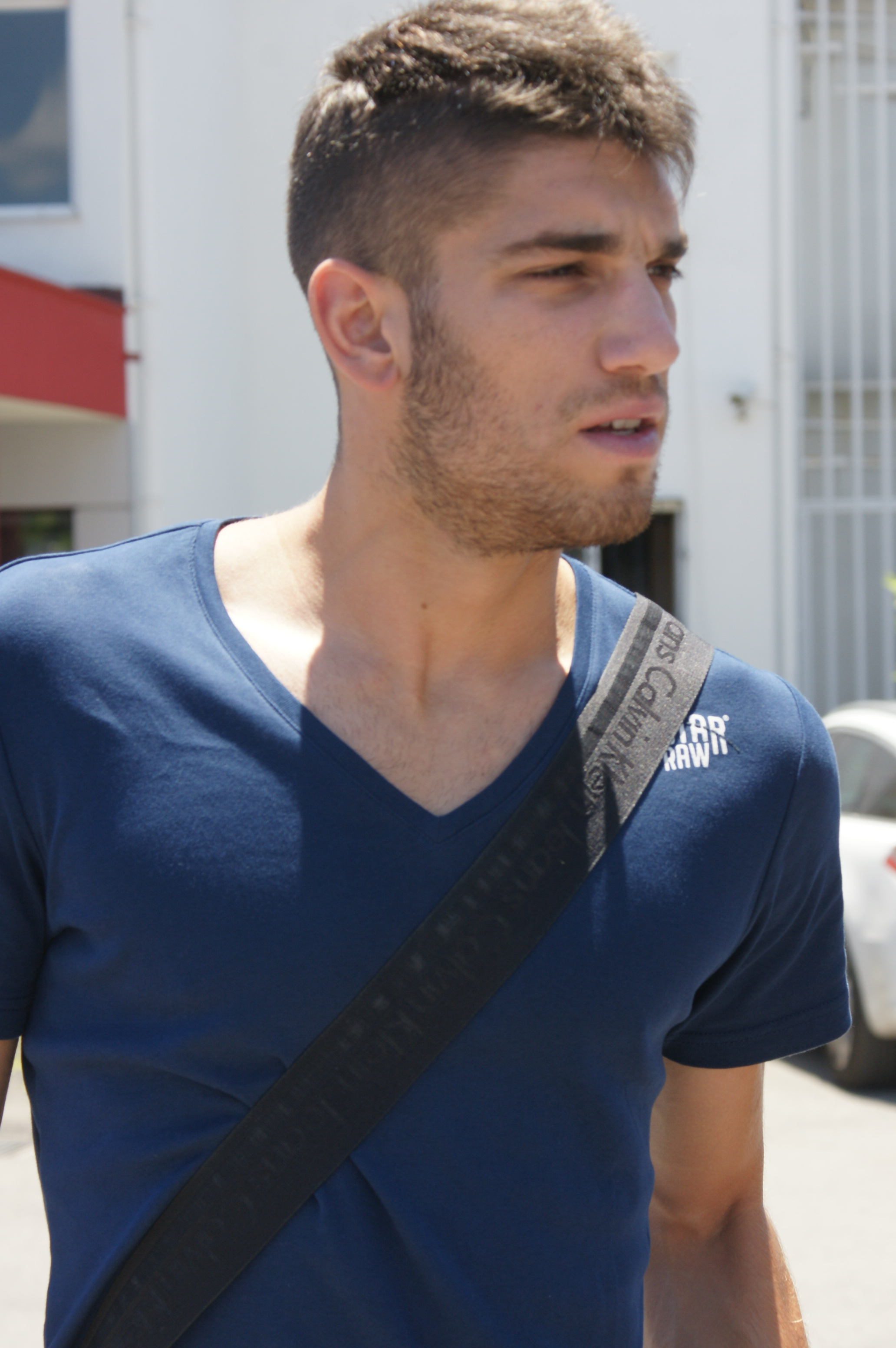

Personal information
- Full name: Nikola Žižić
- Date of birth: 23 January 1988 (age 38)
- Place of birth: Split, SFR Yugoslavia
- Height: 1.93 m (6 ft 4 in)
- Position: Centre back

Youth career
- –2008: Solin
- 2008–2010: Konavljanin

Senior career*
Years	Team	Apps	(Gls)
–2008	Solin	4	(0)
2008–2010	Konavljanin	57	(3)
2010–2011	Bela Krajina	25	(2)
2011–2012	Lučko	27	(0)
2012–2013	Antalyaspor	7	(0)
2014	Fethiyespor	16	(0)
2014–2015	Krka	28	(1)
2015–2017	Istra 1961	61	(2)
2017–2021	AEL	76	(0)
- * Club domestic league appearances and goals as of 28 January 2023

Nikola Žižić (born 23 January 1988) is a Croatian professional footballer who last played as a defender for Greek club AEL.

== Career ==
Physically strong and good at initiating attacks and finishing them, Žižić started his career in second- and third-tier clubs in Croatia and Slovenia – Solin, Konavljanin and Bela Krajina before getting his chance to play in Prva HNL for the newly promoted Lučko, signing a one-year deal. Establishing himself in the first team, he secured a transfer to the Turkish Süper Lig team Antalyaspor, signing a three-year deal with them. After a short period in Turkey and Fethiyespor he returned to Slovenia and played for NK Krka before signing with Croatian side Istra where he had his most successful seasons with 63 league games.

On 7 July 2017, AEL announced the signing of Žižić on a two-year contract. On 20 December 2018, he scored his first goal for the club in a 4–0 away win against Apollon Pontus for the Greek Cup, helping his team secure a spot in the round of 16.

On 9 January 2019, he scored with a long free-kick in a 3–2 home win against Asteras Tripolis for the Greek Cup round of 16. Two weeks later, in the rematch, Nikola temporarily equalized the scoreline with another free-kick, before his team collapsed and conceded 2 goals in less than 10 minutes, losing 7–6 on aggregate and being eliminated from the quarter finals. On 14 May 2021 there was an official announcement about the termination of the player's contract by mutual agreement.

== Career statistics ==
=== Club ===
As of 11 September 2020

Club	Season	League			Cup		Continental		Other		Total	
Club	Season	Division	Apps	Goals	Apps	Goals	Apps	Goals	Apps	Goals	Apps	Goals
Bela Krajina	2010–11	Druga Liga	25	2	0	0	—		—		25	2
Lučko	2011–12	Prva HNL	27	0	0	0	—		—		27	0
Antalyaspor	2012–13	Süper Lig	7	0	5	2	—		—		12	2
Antalyaspor	2013–14	Süper Lig	0	0	0	0	—		—		0	0
Antalyaspor	Total		7	0	5	2	—		—		12	2
Fethiyespor	2013–14	1. Lig	16	0	—		—		—		16	0
Krka	2014–15	Prva Liga	28	1	3	0	—		—		31	1
Istra 1961	2015–16	Prva HNL	32	2	1	0	—		—		33	2
Istra 1961	2016–17	Prva HNL	29	0	1	0	—		—		30	0
Istra 1961	Total		61	2	2	0	—		—		63	2
AEL	2017–18	Super League Greece	24	0	6	0	—		—		30	0
AEL	2018–19	Super League Greece	21	0	3	3	—		—		24	3
AEL	2019–20	Super League Greece	10	0	1	0	—		—		11	0
AEL	2020–21	Super League Greece	1	0	0	0	—		—		1	0
AEL	Total		56	0	10	3	0	0	—		66	3
Career total			220	5	20	5	0	0	0	0	240	10
