= Vasilios Efthymiou =

Greek footballer (born 1999)

Personal information
- Date of birth: 17 March 1999 (age 27)
- Place of birth: Preveza, Greece
- Height: 1.72 m (5 ft 8 in)
- Position: Winger

Team information
- Current team: GS Marko

Youth career
- 2013–2016: PAOK
- 2016–2017: Iraklis

Senior career*
Years	Team	Apps	(Gls)
2017–2020	Thesprotos	61	(3)
2020–2022	Trikala	49	(8)
2022–2023	Proodeftiki	18	(2)
2023–	GS Marko		

International career
2014–2015	Greece U16	4	(0)
- * Club domestic league appearances and goals as of 16 June 2023

Vasilios Efthymiou (Greek: Βασίλειος Ευθυμίου; born 17 March 1999) is a Greek professional footballer who plays as a winger for Gamma Ethniki club GS Marko.
