= Vasilios Voutsinas =

Greek footballer

Personal information
- Full name: Vasilios Voutsinas
- Date of birth: 5 September 1980 (age 46)
- Place of birth: Piraeus, Greece
- Height: 1.82 m (5 ft 11 1/2 in)
- Position: Goalkeeper

Team information
- Current team: Aias Salamina
- Number: 1

Youth career
- Ethnikos Piraeus

Senior career*
Years	Team	Apps	(Gls)
1998–2004	Ethnikos Piraeus	16	(0)
2002	→ Chalkidona (loan)	0	(0)
2004–2005	Keratsini	12	(0)
2005–2010	Aias Salamina	69	(0)
2010–2012	PAO Rouf	40	(0)
2012–2013	Mandraikos	0	(0)
2013–2020	Ethnikos Piraeus	36	(0)
2020–	Aias Salamina		
- * Club domestic league appearances and goals

Vasilios Voutsinas (Greek: Βασίλειος Βουτσινάς; born 5 September 1980) is a Greek footballer, who currently plays for Ethnikos Piraeus in the Football League 2 as a goalkeeper. Nicknamed Superman, he is known as a very smart Goalkeeper with great reflexes and communication with his teammates. He helped his team to win Piraeus amateur league Group 2 and EPSP Cup unbeaten.
