= Anagennisi Plagia F.C. =

Anagennisi Plagia FC
- Full name: Athlitikos Podosferikos Omilos Anagennisi Plagia
- Founded: 1970; 56 years ago
- Ground: Plagia Municipal Stadium
- Chairman: Victoria Tsireli
- Manager: Georgios Catziioannidis

Anagennisi Plagia Football Club (Greek: Α.Π.Ο. Αναγέννηση Πλαγιάς) is a Greek football club based in Plagia, Kilkis, Greece.

== Honours ==
=== Domestic ===
  - Kilkis FCA Champions: 1
    - 2019–20
  - Kilkis FCA Cup Winners: 2
    - 2017–18, 2019–20
