= Pavlos Makrygiannis =

Greek footballer

Personal information
- Date of birth: 20 June 1995 (age 31)
- Place of birth: Athens, Greece
- Height: 1.78 m (5 ft 10 in)
- Positions: Winger; attacking midfielder

Team information
- Current team: Ethnikos Piraeus
- Number: 10

Youth career
- Acharnaikos

Senior career*
Years	Team	Apps	(Gls)
2011–2014	Acharnaikos		
2014–2015	Tilikratis		
2015–2016	PAS Acheron Kanallaki		
2016–2017	Tilikratis		
2017–2018	Ethnikos Piraeus		(5)
2018–2019	Kallithea		
2019–20	Egaleo	6	(0)
2021–22	Proodeftiki		
2022–23	Panelefsiniakos		
2023–	Ethnikos Piraeus		(9)
- * Club domestic league appearances and goals as of 18 August 2020

Pavlos Makrygiannis (Greek: Παύλος Μακρυγιάννης; born 20 June 1995) is a Greek professional footballer who plays as an attacking midfielder for Gamma Ethniki club Ethnikos Piraeus F.C.
