= Dimitrios Litenas =

Greek footballer

Personal information
- Date of birth: 21 September 1995 (age 31)
- Place of birth: Larissa, Greece
- Height: 1.71 m (5 ft 7 in)
- Position: Midfielder

Team information
- Current team: Ayia Napa

Youth career
- –2013: Filoktitis Melivia
- 2013–2014: Tyrnavos

Senior career*
Years	Team	Apps	(Gls)
2014–2016	Tyrnavos	31	(6)
2016–2017	AEL Kalloni	24	(0)
2017–2018	Veria	14	(0)
2018–2023	Apollon Larissa	112	(5)
2023	Iraklis Larissa	9	(0)
2023–2025	Niki Volos	43	(1)
2025–	Ayia Napa	25	(0)
- * Club domestic league appearances and goals as of 3 May 2026

Dimitrios Litenas (Greek: Δημήτριος Λίταινας; born 21 September 1995) is a Greek professional footballer who plays as a midfielder for Cypriot Second Division club Ayia Napa.
