= Stergios Tsimikas =

Greek footballer

Personal information
- Date of birth: 16 February 1994 (age 32)
- Place of birth: Thessaloniki, Greece
- Height: 1.74 m (5 ft 9 in)
- Position: Midfielder

Senior career*
Years	Team	Apps	(Gls)
2012–2018	Panserraikos	133	(6)
2018	Rochester Super 9		
2019	Trikala	15	(1)
2019–2021	Panserraikos	26	(2)
2022	Apollon Pontus	15	(0)
2022–2023	Iraklis Larissa	9	(0)
2023–2024	Apollon Paralimnio	0	(0)
- * Club domestic league appearances and goals as of 22 January 2023

Stergios Tsimikas (Greek: Στέργιος Τσιμίκας; born 16 February 1994) is a Greek professional footballer who plays as a midfielder.

== Career ==
Tsimikas started his career with Greek second-tier side Panserraikos, where he made 133 appearances and scored 6 goals and suffered relegation to the Greek third tier. On 3 October 2012, Tsimikas debuted for Panserraikos during a 3–2 win over Kallithea. On 22 May 2013, he scored his first goal for Panserraikos during a 3–0 win over Vyzas Megara.

In 2018, Tsimikas signed for Rochester Super 9 in the American fifth tier. Before the second half of 2018–19, he signed for Greek second-tier club Trikala. In 2019, he returned to Panserraikos in the Greek fourth tier, helping them earn promotion to the Greek third tier. Before the second half of 2021–22, Tsimikas signed for Greek second-tier team Apollon Pontus.

== Personal life ==
He is the brother of Greece international Kostas Tsimikas.
