= Thyella Kamari F.C. =

Greek football club

Thyella Kamari
- Full name: Athlitikos Syllogos Thyella Kamari
- Founded: 1970; 56 years ago
- Ground: Kamari Municipal Stadium
- Capacity: 1,500 (700 seated)
- Chairman: Evangelos Fousteris
- Manager: Stefanos Kremezis
- League: Cyclades FCA First Division
- 2025–26: Cyclades FCA First Division, 2nd
- Website: Official website
Home colours	Away colours

Thyella Kamari Football Club (Greek: Α.Σ. Θύελλα Καμαρίου) is a Greek football club based in Kamari, Santorini, Cyclades.

== History ==
Thyella Kamari was created in the late 60s in Kamari, Santorini and has officially existed since the early 70s. A few years later, the Greek state granted land to be used to construct a stadium for the Football Club. Since then and for several years, he has been actively present in the football categories of the Cyclades, noting significant distinctions.

In 2009 the team goes through the modern era since after a long period of abstinence from the Cyclades FCA championships, it is reactivated as in the same year its physical headquarters will be the first stadium on the island which will have an artificial turf.

The highlight of the modern history of the team is its emergence as a double Cyclades for the first time in its history in the 2017–18 season. In the same year, the team celebrated its rise in the Gamma Ethniki and its participation in the groups of the Greek Cup, writing in golden letters its name in the history of Cycladic football since it is the first team from its prefecture to do so.

Thyella Kamari participated in the Championship of the Gamma Ethniki for the 2019–20 season and in the Greek Cup as well as in the age championships U18, U16, U14 and U12.

== Crest and colours ==
The emblem of Thyella Kamari depicts the island of Santorini with white color in a combination of red and blue colors that are the main colors of the team.

== Stadium ==
The team is playing in its physical headquarters, which is the Kamari Municipal Stadium.

== Honours ==
=== Domestic ===
  - Cyclades FCA champion: 3
    - 2017–18, 2023–24, 2024–25
  - Cyclades FCA Second Division champion: 1
    - 2010–11
  - Cyclades FCA Cup Winners: 2
    - 2017–18, 2023–24
