= Nikos Tsoukalos =

Greek footballer (born 1992)

Personal information
- Full name: Nikolaos Tsoukalos
- Date of birth: 23 March 1992 (age 34)
- Place of birth: Lamia, Greece
- Height: 1.83 m (6 ft 0 in)
- Position: Winger

Youth career
- Akadimia Lamias

Senior career*
Years	Team	Apps	(Gls)
2011–2015	Tyrnavos	56	(4)
2015–2016	Anagennisi Karditsa	29	(2)
2016–2024	Lamia	103	(8)
2024–2025	Egaleo	15	(0)
2025	Ilioupolis	1	(0)
- * Club domestic league appearances and goals as of 1 July 2025

Nikos Tsoukalos (Greek: Νίκος Τσούκαλος; born 23 March 1992) is a Greek professional footballer who plays as a winger.
