= Giannis Bastianos =

Greek footballer (born 1998)

Personal information
- Full name: Ioannis Bastianos
- Date of birth: 29 April 1998 (age 28)
- Place of birth: Chios, Greece
- Height: 1.73 m (5 ft 8 in)
- Position: Winger

Team information
- Current team: Karmiotissa
- Number: 29

Youth career
- 2014–2016: AEL Kalloni
- 2016–2017: Asteras Tripolis

Senior career*
Years	Team	Apps	(Gls)
2017–2020	Asteras Tripolis	3	(0)
2017–2018	→ Veria (loan)	14	(1)
2019–2020	→ Apollon Smyrnis (loan)	10	(1)
2020	→ Levadiakos (loan)	4	(1)
2020–2021	Apollon Larissa	10	(1)
2021–2022	Diagoras	31	(6)
2022–2023	Egaleo	24	(5)
2023–2025	Hibernians	38	(7)
2025	Chania	1	(1)
2025-	Karmiotissa	27	(6)

International career^{‡}
2017	Greece U19	3	(0)
2018	Greece U20	2	(1)
2017–2018	Greece U21	1	(0)
- * Club domestic league appearances and goals as of 3 May 2026 ‡ National team caps and goals as of 20 December 2017

Giannis Bastianos (Greek: Γιάννης Μπαστιάνος; born 29 April 1998) is a Greek professional footballer who plays as a winger for Cypriot club Karmiotissa.
