= Ermis Amyntaio F.C. =

Ermis Amyntaio
- Founded: 1926; 100 years ago
- Ground: Amyntaio Municipal Stadium
- Chairman: Lefteris Karapanagiotidis
- Manager: Dimitris Aliatidis
- League: Florina FCA First Division
- 2025–26: Florina FCA First Division, 8th
Home colours	Away colours

Ermis Amyntaio Football Club (Greek: Γ.Σ. Ερμής Αμυνταίου) is a Greek football club based in Amyntaio, Florina (regional unit), Greece

== Honours ==
=== Domestic ===
  - Florina FCA Champions: 6
    - 1982–83, 1989–90, 2016–17, 2019–20, 2022–23, 2023–24
  - Florina FCA Cup Winners: 5
    - 2000–01, 2014–15, 2017–18, 2022–23, 2023–24
