= Alexandros Arnarellis =

Greek footballer (born 1991)

Personal information
- Date of birth: 1 October 1991 (age 35)
- Place of birth: Athens, Greece
- Height: 1.80 m (5 ft 11 in)
- Position: Winger

Team information
- Current team: Haidari

Youth career
- Apollon Smyrnis

Senior career*
| Years | Team | Apps | (Gls) |
| 2007–2010 | Apollon Smyrnis | 19 | (1) |
| 2010–2011 | Athinaikos | 15 | (0) |
| 2011–2012 | Triglia Rafinas | 24 | (10) |
| 2012–2014 | Vyzas Megara | 50 | (7) |
| 2014–2016 | Kallithea | 54 | (12) |
| 2016–2017 | Kerkyra | 15 | (5) |
| 2017 | Trikala | 23 | (3) |
| 2017–2018 | Panegialios | 10 | (2) |
| 2018 | Doxa Drama | 10 | (4) |
| 2018–2020 | Chania | 42 | (11) |
| 2020–2021 | Rodos | 18 | (5) |
| 2021–2022 | Egaleo | 32 | (15) |
| 2022–2024 | Kalamata | 34 | (6) |
| 2024 | Panionios | | |
| 2024–2025 | Aris Petroupolis | | |
| 2025 | Ilisiakos | | |
| 2025–2026 | Saronikos Anavyssos | | |
| 2026– | Haidari | | |
- * Club domestic league appearances and goals as of 30 December 2023

Alexandros Arnarellis (Greek: Αλέξανδρος Αρναρέλλης; born 1 October 1991) is a Greek professional footballer who plays as a winger for Haidari.
