= Konstantinos Bouloulis =

Greek footballer (born 1993)

Personal information
- Full name: Konstantinos Bouloulis Tsaprounis
- Date of birth: 7 December 1993 (age 32)
- Place of birth: Lamia, Greece
- Height: 1.73 m (5 ft 8 in)
- Position: Defensive midfielder

Team information
- Current team: Athens Kallithea FC
- Number: 6

Youth career
- Akadimia Lamias

Senior career*
Years	Team	Apps	(Gls)
2010–2012	Fokikos	45	(2)
2012–2015	Atromitos	0	(0)
2012–2014	→ Fokikos (loan)	11	(2)
2014	→ Ionikos (loan)	1	(0)
2015	→ Atromitos Piraeus (loan)	10	(1)
2015–2021	Lamia	77	(1)
2021–	Athens Kallithea	72	(2)
- * Club domestic league appearances and goals as of 7 June 2024

Konstantinos Bouloulis (Greek: Κωνσταντίνος Μπουλούλης; born 7 December 1993) is a Greek professional footballer who plays as a defensive midfielder for Super League 2 club Athens Kallithea FC.

== Career ==
Born and raised in Fokida, Bouloulis began his career at local side Fokikos, and passed through Atromitos and Ionikos before eventually signing for Lamia, where he would make 46 appearances in Super League 1 and 31 appearances in Super League 2 across six seasons.

From Lamia, Bouloulis joined Athens Kallithea FC in September 2021.
