= Panagiotis Moraitis =

Greek association football player (born 1997)

Personal information
- Date of birth: 1 February 1997 (age 29)
- Place of birth: Agrinio, Greece
- Height: 1.80 m (5 ft 11 in)
- Position: Striker

Team information
- Current team: Teruel

Youth career
- 2014–2016: Panetolikos

Senior career*
Years	Team	Apps	(Gls)
2016–2019	Panachaiki	66	(21)
2020–2021	Budućnost Podgorica	26	(9)
2021–2022	Borac Banja Luka	38	(6)
2022–2023	Apollon Smyrnis	26	(18)
2023–2024	Volos	27	(5)
2024–2025	AEL	23	(6)
2025–2026	Panionios	23	(6)
2026–	Teruel	0	(0)

International career^{‡}
2015	Greece U18	2	(0)
2016	Greece U19	1	(0)
2017–2018	Greece U21	3	(1)
- * Club domestic league appearances and goals as of April 20, 2026 ‡ National team caps and goals as of March 29, 2025

Panagiotis Moraitis (Greek: Παναγιώτης Μωραΐτης; born 1 February 1997) is a Greek professional association football player who plays as a forward for Primera Federación club Teruel.

== Club career ==
=== Budućnost Podgorica ===
On 26 February 2020, Moraitis signed a half-season contract with Montenegrin First League club Budućnost Podgorica. He scored eight goals in his first nine league matches for Budućnost. Moraitis remained in Montenegro during the COVID-19 pandemic and at one point was obligated to serve the Hellenic Armed Forces as a conscript in June 2020. However, an agreement was made such that he no longer needed to serve for the time being.

=== Borac Banja Luka ===
On 1 March 2021, Moraitis signed a contract with Bosnian Premier League club Borac Banja Luka. He officially debuted for Borac in a Bosnian Cup game against Široki Brijeg on 10 March 2021. Moraitis scored his first goal for the club in a league game against Radnik Bijeljina on 2 April 2021. He won his first trophy with Borac on 23 May 2021, getting crowned Bosnian Premier League champions one game before the end of the 2020–21 season.

=== Volos ===
On 26 July 2023, Moraitis joined Volos.

== International career ==
Moraitis represented Greece on various youth levels.

== Honours ==
=== Panachaiki ===
- Gamma Ethniki: 2016–17

=== Budućnost Podgorica ===
- Montenegrin First League: 2019–20

=== Borac Banja Luka ===
- Bosnian Premier League: 2020–21

=== Larissa ===
- Super League Greece 2: 2024–25
