= Doxa Neo Sidirochori F.C. =

Doxa Neo Sidirochori
- Full name: Doxa Neo Sidirochori
- Founded: 1970; 56 years ago
- Ground: Komotini Municipal Stadium
- Capacity: 6,198
- Chairman: Filippos Tsourpoudis
- Manager: Spyros Koutsogiannis
- League: Gamma Ethniki
- 2025–26: Thrace FCA First Division, 1st (promoted)
Home colours	Away colours

Doxa Neo Sidirochori Football Club is a Greek football club, based in Neo Sidirochori, Rhodope, Greece.

== History ==
Doxa Neo Sidirochori was founded in 1970. During the 1983–84 season, the club won the Thrace FCA championship. In the following season, 1984–85, it competed in the Delta Ethniki for the first time, placed in Group 7, where it finished in 17th place and was relegated to the local divisions. It remained there for only one season (1985–86), as it was crowned Thrace FCA champion for a second time. In the 1986–87 season, the team participated in the Delta Ethniki for the second time, again in Group 7, finishing 19th and last in the standings, which led to another relegation to the local championships.

In the Thrace FCA Cup, the club won the title for the first time in its history during the 2015–16 season. In the 2016–17 season, Doxa was crowned Thrace FCA champion for the third time, earning promotion to the Gamma Ethniki, In its first season in the amateur Gamma Ethniki (2017–18), the team was placed in Group 1.

During the 2019–20 season, Doxa once again won the Thrace FCA championship and earned promotion to the Gamma Ethniki, which by then operated as the fourth tier. The following season (2020–21), the club was unable to maintain its place in the division and returned to the local championship. In the 2025–26 season, after a thrilling campaign, it won the championship title and secured its return to the national divisions.

== Honours ==
- Thrace FCA Champions:5
  - 1983–84, 1985–86, 2016–17, 2019– 20, 2025–26
- Thrace FCA Cup Winners: 1
  - 2015–16
- Thrace FCA Super Cup Winners: 1
  - 2026
