= Aristotelis Panagiotidis =

Greek footballer

Personal information
- Full name: Aristotelis Panagiotidis
- Date of birth: 17 January 1997 (age 29)
- Place of birth: Ptolemaida, Greece
- Height: 1.77 m (5 ft 9 1/2 in)
- Position: Midfielder

Team information
- Current team: AEP Karagiannia

Youth career
- –2016: PAOK

Senior career*
Years	Team	Apps	(Gls)
2016–2017	PAOK	0	(0)
2016–2017	→ Panserraikos (loan)	3	(0)
2017–2018	Kallithea	1	(0)
2018	AEP Karagiannia	?	(?)
2018–2019	Apollon Paralimnio	?	(?)
2019–	Tsilivi	?	(?)
- * Club domestic league appearances and goals as of 5 February 2018

Aristotelis Panagiotidis (Greek: Αριστοτέλης Παναγιωτίδης, born 17 January 1997) is a Greek professional footballer who plays as a midfielder for AEP Karagiannia.

== Club career ==
On 12 August 2016 it was announced that Panagiotidis signed a long year season contract with Panserraikos, on loan from PAOK.
