= Paleochora F.C. =

AO Paleochora
- Full name: Αθλητικός Όμιλος Παλαιόχωρας; Athlitikós Ómilos Palaióchoras (Palaiochora Athletic Club)
- Founded: 1982; 44 years ago
- Ground: Kandanos Municipal Stadium, Kandanos, Chania, Crete
- Chairman: Iosif Delakis
- Manager: Vassilis Tsartsidis
- League: Chania FCA First Division
- 2025–26: Chania FCA First Division, 13th
- Website: https://palaiochorafc.blogspot.gr/
Home colours	Away colours

A.O. Paleochora F.C., short for Athlitikos Omilos Paleochora Football Club (Greek: Αθλητικός Όμιλος Παλαιόχωρας, lit. 'Palaiochora Athletic Club') and also simply known as Paleochora or Palaiochora, is a Greek football club, based in Palaiochora, Chania, Crete. The club was established in 1982, and its traditional colors are yellow and blue. The club currently competes in the Chania FCA First Division, the fourth tier of the Greek football league system.

== History ==
Despite being founded in 1982, Paleochora made its official Chania FCA League debut during the 1990−91 season, when they instantly won the C regional Division title and earned promotion to the B Division. Afterwards, they played for three seasons in the B Division, achieving promotion to the Chania FCA A Division during the 1993-94 season, after finishing 3rd in the B League and winning the promotion play-off match vs. Ikaros Tavronitis.

Paleochora featured in 11 consecutive editions of the Chania FCA A Division, achieving its best finish in 2002 (5th), the same year it reached the Chania FCA Cup Final. They were relegated to the B Division three years later, where they spent again three seasons before briefly resurfacing in the A Division in 2006. In 2010, the club was once again promoted to the A Division and hasn't been relegated ever since.

In 2017, Paleochora won its first ever Chania FCA A Division championship, managing instant promotion to the Gamma Ethniki, the third tier of the Greek football league system.
