= Alexandros Piastopoulos =

Greek footballer

Personal information
- Date of birth: 14 March 1996 (age 30)
- Place of birth: Thessaloniki, Greece
- Height: 1.73 m (5 ft 8 in)
- Position: Midfielder

Team information
- Current team: Apollon Kalamarias
- Number: 6

Youth career
- –2013: Atromitos
- 2013–2015: PAOK

Senior career*
Years	Team	Apps	(Gls)
2015–2017	Valenciennes B	4	(0)
2017–2018	Volos	16	(1)
2018–2019	Aiginiakos	23	(1)
2019–2020	Kerkyra	8	(0)
2020–2021	Trikala	26	(0)
2021–2023	Egaleo	34	(0)
2023	Ypato		
2023–2024	Apollon Smyrnis		
2024–	Apollon Kalamarias	6	(0)

International career^{‡}
2014	Greece U18	3	(0)
- * Club domestic league appearances and goals as of 17 May 2026 ‡ National team caps and goals as of 8 January 2014

Alexandros Piastopoulos (Greek: Αλέξανδρος Πιαστόπουλος; born 14 March 1996) is a Greek professional footballer who plays as a midfielder for Super League 2 club Apollon Kalamarias.

== Honours ==
Volos

- Gamma Ethniki: 2017–18
