= Mark Nyaaba Asigba =

Ghanaian footballer

Mark Asigba
Personal information
- Full name: Nyaaba Asigba Mark Illarramendi
- Date of birth: 7 July 1990 (age 36)
- Place of birth: Accra, Ghana
- Height: 1.77 m (5 ft 9 1/2 in)
- Position: Defender

Team information
- Current team: Kifissos

Youth career
- 2011–2013: CD Madridejos

Senior career*
Years	Team	Apps	(Gls)
2013–2014	Fokikos	18	(1)
2014–2017	Olympiacos	0	(0)
2014–2016	→ Panachaiki (loan)	53	(0)
2016–2017	→ Veria (loan)	22	(0)
2017–2021	Lamia	58	(1)
2022	Irodotos	11	(0)
2022–2023	Kalamata	17	(0)
2023–2024	Ilioupoli	26	(1)
2024	Nea Artaki	4	(0)
2025–	Kifissos		
- * Club domestic league appearances and goals as of 19:00, 1 May 2022 (UTC)

Mark Asigba (born 7 July 1990) is a Ghanaian professional footballer who plays as a defender for Kifissos.

== Career ==
On 12 July 2017, he signed a one-year contract with Lamia.

On 26 May 2018, Asigba extended his contract until the summer of 2020.

On 19 October 2024, he signed a contract with Nea Artaki.

== Career statistics ==
As of 28 May 2021

Club	Season	League			Cup		Continental		Other		Total	
Club	Season	Division	Apps	Goals	Apps	Goals	Apps	Goals	Apps	Goals	Apps	Goals
Fokikos	2013–14	Football League Greece	18	1	0	0	—		—		18	1
Panachaiki (loan)	2014–15	Football League Greece	23	0	4	0	—		—		27	0
Panachaiki (loan)	2015–16	Football League Greece	30	0	3	0	—		—		33	0
Panachaiki (loan)	Total		53	0	7	0	—		—		60	0
Veria (loan)	2016–17	Super League Greece	22	0	3	0	—		—		25	0
Lamia	2017–18	Super League Greece	28	0	6	0	—		—		34	0
Lamia	2018–19	Super League Greece	13	0	6	1	—		—		19	1
Lamia	2019–20	Super League Greece	11	1	6	0	—		—		17	1
Lamia	2020–21	Super League Greece	6	0	1	0	—		—		7	0
Lamia	Total		58	1	19	1	—		—		77	2
Career total			151	1	29	1	0	0	0	0	180	3
