= Christos Rovas =

Greek footballer

Personal information
- Date of birth: 2 September 1994 (age 32)
- Place of birth: Chios, Greece
- Height: 1.79 m (5 ft 10 in)
- Position: Forward

Team information
- Current team: Kavala
- Number: 10

Youth career
- 2010–2011: Panserraikos

Senior career*
Years	Team	Apps	(Gls)
2011–2014	Ethnikos Sidirokastro	52	(17)
2014	Pannaxiakos	13	(8)
2014–2015	Giouchtas	20	(10)
2015–2016	Ionikos	21	(10)
2016–2017	Apollon Pontus	8	(0)
2017	Ermis Zoniana	12	(4)
2017–2019	Iraklis	55	(34)
2019–2020	Doxa Drama	16	(6)
2020–2021	Tabor Sežana	28	(9)
2021–2022	Almopos Aridea	30	(20)
2022–2024	Kalamata	37	(12)
2024	Floriana	7	(2)
2024–2025	Panachaiki	12	(1)
2025	Egaleo	9	(1)
2025–2026	Kampaniakos	15	(2)
2026–	Kavala	9	(2)
- * Club domestic league appearances and goals as of 20 April 2026

Christos Rovas (Greek: Χρήστος Ρόβας; born 2 September 1994) is a Greek professional footballer who plays as a forward for Super League 2 club Kavala.
