= Damian Gjini =

Albanian footballer (born 1995)

Personal information
- Date of birth: 6 April 1995 (age 31)
- Place of birth: Athens, Greece
- Height: 1.82 m (6 ft 0 in)
- Position: Midfielder

Team information
- Current team: Panionios
- Number: 22

Youth career
- –2014: Panionios

Senior career*
Years	Team	Apps	(Gls)
2014–2018	Panionios	6	(0)
2015–2017	→ Kallithea (loan)	48	(3)
2017–2018	→ Chania Kissamikos (loan)	30	(1)
2018–2019	Chania Kissamikos	17	(1)
2019	Laçi	2	(0)
2020	Rodos	0	(0)
2020–2021	Ierapetra	26	(5)
2021–2022	Anagennisi Karditsa	31	(6)
2022–2023	Kifisia	22	(5)
2023–2024	Ionikos	36	(2)
2024–	Panionios	19	(3)

International career
2013–2014	Albania U19	7	(0)
2015–2016	Albania U21	4	(0)
- * Club domestic league appearances and goals as of 15 June 2025

Damian Gjini (born 6 April 1995) is a professional footballer who plays as a midfielder for Super League 2 club Panionios. Born in Greece, he has represented Albania at youth international level.

== Career ==
On 4 August 2017 Gjini was loaned out again from Panionios to Football League (Greece) club AO Chania Kissamikos.

At the end of December 2019 it was confirmed, that Gjini would join Rodos FC from 2020.

== Career statistics ==
=== Club ===
As of 5 May 2019

Club	Season	League			Cup		Europe (Note: Including continental competitions, such as UEFA Champions League and UEFA Europa League)		Other (Note: Including other competitions, such as Greek Super Cup)		Total	
Club	Season	Division	Apps	Goals	Apps	Goals	Apps	Goals	Apps	Goals	Apps	Goals
Panionios	2014–15	Super League Greece	6	0	2	0	—		—		8	0
Panionios	Total		6	0	2	0	0	0	0	0	8	0
Kallithea	2015–16	Football League	20	1	2	0	—		—		22	1
Kallithea	2016–17	Football League	28	2	3	0	—		—		31	2
Kallithea	Total		48	3	5	0	0	0	0	0	53	3
AO Chania Kissamikos	2017–18	Football League	30	1	3	0	—		—		33	1
AO Chania Kissamikos	2018–19	Football League	17	1	6	1	—		—		23	2
AO Chania Kissamikos	Total		47	2	9	1	0	0	0	0	56	3
Career total			101	5	16	1	0	0	0	0	117	6
