= Charalampos Damianakis =

Greek footballer

Babis Damianakis
Personal information
- Full name: Charalampos Damianakis
- Date of birth: 14 June 1995 (age 31)
- Place of birth: Heraklion, Greece
- Height: 1.88 m (6 ft 2 in)
- Position: Centre back

Team information
- Current team: Almyros Gaziou

Youth career
- 2012–2013: OFI

Senior career*
Years	Team	Apps	(Gls)
2013–2016	OFI	13	(0)
2016–2017	AEL	1	(0)
2016–2017	→ AO Chania (loan)	30	(1)
2017–2018	Veria	12	(2)
2018–2019	Irodotos	12	(0)
2019	AO Poros		
2020–	Almyros Gaziou		

International career
2014	Greece U19	1	(0)
- * Club domestic league appearances and goals as of 25 June 2019

Charalampos "Babis" Damianakis (Greek: Χαράλαμπος "Μπάμπης" Δαμιανάκης; born 14 June 1995) is a Greek professional football player who plays as a centre back for Almyros Gaziou.

== Career ==
Damianakis began his career with the youth team of OFI. On 1 July 2013 he was promoted to the first squad and signed a professional contract. He played for the Cretan club for almost 3 years and made 13 official appearances in the Greek Super League and in the Gamma Ethniki. On 29 January 2016 he signed a 3,5 years contract with AEL. On 28 August 2016 Damianakis was given on loan to Cretan Football League club AO Chania until the end of the season. For the 2017–18 season, he signed with Football League club Veria.

On 30 December 2019, Damianakis joined Almyros Gaziou.
