= Fiorin Durmishaj =

Greek footballer (born 1996)

Personal information
- Date of birth: 14 November 1996 (age 29)
- Place of birth: Vlorë, Albania
- Height: 1.87 m (6 ft 1 1/2 in)
- Position: Second striker

Team information
- Current team: Čukarički
- Number: 25

Youth career
- 2005–2006: Dorieas Rodos
- 2006–2009: Rodos
- 2009–2014: Panionios

Senior career*
Years	Team	Apps	(Gls)
2014–2019	Panionios	52	(10)
2015–2016	→ Kallithea (loan)	32	(7)
2016–2017	→ Lamia (loan)	25	(8)
2019–2021	Olympiacos	0	(0)
2019	→ Waasland-Beveren (loan)	8	(0)
2020	→ Aris (loan)	6	(0)
2020–2021	→ AEL (loan)	27	(5)
2021–2023	OFI	35	(4)
2023	→ Olympiakos Nicosia (loan)	9	(4)
2023–2025	Nea Salamis	59	(11)
2025–2026	Iraklis	18	(4)
2026–	Čukarički	2	(1)

International career^{‡}
2012	Albania U17	1	(0)
2014	Albania U19	1	(0)
2015–2018	Albania U21	9	(1)
2019	Greece	1	(0)
- * Club domestic league appearances and goals as of August 2, 2026 ‡ National team caps and goals as of January 1, 2020

Fiorin Durmishaj (Greek: Φιορίν Ντουρμισάι; born 14 November 1996) is a professional footballer who plays as a forward. Born in Albania, he has played for the Greece national team.

== Club career ==
=== Panionios ===
Durmishaj made his debut on 1 November 2014, as a substitute in a 2–2 away Super League draw game against Veria.

=== Olympiacos ===
In December 2018, Panionios' striker Fiorin Durmishaj is on the verge of officially joining Olympiacos. In Nea Smyrni, Durmishaj has been making notable progress in the 2018–19 season. On 18 June 2019, he officially signed a contract with Greek powerhouse Olympiacos. On 28 December 2019, Durmishaj who spent the first half of the season on loan at Waasland-Beveren in Belgium, spent the second half of the season with Aris. On 29 July 2020, he was loaned out to AEL.

=== OFI ===
On 26 August 2021, Durmishaj joined OFI on a three-year contract.

== International career ==
=== Albania ===
Durmishaj received his first international call up at the Albania national under-21 team by coach Redi Jupi for the 2017 UEFA European Under-21 Championship qualification match against Hungary U21 on 13 October 2015.

Durmishaj was called up by coach Alban Bushi for the friendly match against France U21, on 5 June 2017 and the 2019 UEFA European Under-21 Championship qualification opening match against Estonia U21, on 12 June 2017. In the opening match of the qualifiers against Estonia U21, Durmishaj was an unused substitute in the bench for the entire match. He scored his first international goal for Albania U21, on 4 September 2017 against Iceland U21 in the 75th minute to give Albania U21 an away 2–3 victory, the first one of the competition.

=== Greece ===
In March 2019, Durmishaj was designated to represent Greece but one document remained to allow his participation. The young winger, who played for Albania as a youth international is a Greek citizen and the Hellenic Football Federation needed to assemble all the required documents that would enable the 22-year-old to play for the national team. The Albanian Football Association needed to provide that document, and it was expected to be done in time for Durmishaj to participate in the first two UEFA Euro 2020 qualifying matches against Liechtenstein and Bosnia and Herzegovina.

On 24 March 2019 and on the road, ahead of the crucial upcoming UEFA Euro 2020 qualifying match against Bosnia and Herzegovina, head coach of the Greece national team, Angelos Anastasiadis summoned Durmishhaj to replace the injured Kostas Mitroglou. He made his debut on 30 May 2019, in a friendly against Turkey, as a 65th-minute substitute for Georgios Masouras.

== Career statistics ==
=== Club ===
As of 12 March 2024

Club	Season	League			Cup		Europe (Note: Including continental competitions, such as UEFA Champions League and UEFA Europa League)		Total	
Club	Season	Division	Apps	Goals	Apps	Goals	Apps	Goals	Apps	Goals
Panionios	2014–15	Super League Greece	2	0	1	0	—		3	0
Panionios	2015–16	Super League Greece	2	0	2	0	—		4	0
Panionios	2017–18	Super League Greece	21	4	5	2	3 (Note: All Appearance(s) in UEFA Europa League)	0	29	6
Panionios	2018–19	Super League Greece	27	6	6	5	—		33	11
Panionios	Total		52	10	14	7	3	0	69	17
Olympiacos	2019–20	Super League Greece	0	0	0	0	0	0	0	0
Kallithea	2014–15	Football League	20	6	—		—		20	6
Kallithea	2015–16	Football League	12	1	—		—		12	1
Kallithea	Total		32	7	—		—		32	7
Lamia	2016–17	Football League	25	8	3	0	—		28	8
Waasland-Beveren	2019–20	Belgian First Division A	8	0	1	2	—		9	2
Aris	2019–20	Super League Greece	6	0	3	0	—		9	0
AEL	2020–21	Super League Greece	27	5	1	0	—		28	5
OFI	2021–22	Super League Greece	23	3	1	0	—		24	3
OFI	2022–23	Super League Greece	12	1	1	0	—		13	1
Olympiakos Nicosia	2022–23	Cypriot First Division	9	4	1	0	—		10	4
Nea Salamis	2023–24	Cypriot First Division	27	7	2	1	—		29	8
Career total			221	45	27	10	3	0	251	55
