= Apollon Paralimnio F.C. =

Association football club in Greece

Apollon Paralimnio
- Full name: Apollon Paralimnio Football Club
- Founded: 1970; 56 years ago
- Ground: Paralimnio Ground
- Capacity: 800
- Chairman: Odysseas Gavranidis
- Manager: Ioannis Balasas
- League: Gamma Ethniki
- 2025–26: Serres FCA First Division, 1st (promoted)
- Website: Official website
Home colours	Away colours

Apollon Paralimnio Football Club (Greek: Π.Σ. Απόλλων Παραλιμνίου) is a Greek football club based in Paralimnio, Serres.

== History ==
The year 1970 was a milestone year for Apollon Paralimnio. In 1970, the idea of merging two groups began. By Digenis and Iraklis Paralimnio. On 14 April 1971, the sports club was officially founded under the name "Football Club of Paralimnio Apollon".

The purpose of the association as described in its statutes is the symmetrical and harmonious development of the physical and mental strength and skills of the members and the creation of strong and moral characters by using competition and football in combination with the implementation of an educational program for athletes.

After the change of the millennium, the successes of Apollon in terms of titles begin. The beginning is in the season 2000–01 with the conquest of the Serres FCA Cup. This is followed by an even more successful season, in 2001–2002, when they won the double of the local association, acquiring at the same time the right to participate in the Fourth National Division of Greece. They remained in the 4th National for five consecutive years until the 2005–2006 season. In the meantime, in 2004–05, they won the Serres FCA Cup again.

The team immediately enters a very difficult period in its history after not finding the appropriate interest from people to continue Apollon. The 2011–12 season begins with a new effort by young people with an appetite for work and a vision for the team. The necessary funds have been found to regenerate the team and make a fresh start with players who come from the lakeside, with the player-coach and president Keramaris Dimitris in front, along with a group of people determined to bring the team back to success while always keeping a low profile. He started his career by participating in the 3rd category of Serres FCA and ascended to the First Division in two years. In the 2015–16 season, he manages to return to the National categories, facing Makedonikos, AO Kardia and Doxa Petroussa in the promotion barrages. In the periods 2012–13, 2014–15 and 2017–18, he becomes the cup winner of Serres FCA again. The year 2018 was, so far, the most successful in the history of the team, managing to win the championship of the first group of the Gamma Ethniki, participating in the promotion barrages for the promotion to the Second National, with opponents Iraklis, Volos and Tilikratis.

The 2022–23 season is the most historic season, with the team reaching the quarterfinals of the Greek Cup. In order to achieve that, Apollon had to win against Panargiakos Argos Orestiko, Asteras Petriti, Ionikos and Agios Nikolaos, becoming the first team from Gamma Ethniki to reach the quarterfinals of the Greek Cup. They ended up losing 6–3 to Lamia.

During this period, the club competed in the Gamma Ethniki for nine consecutive seasons, from 2016–17 through 2024–25.

During the 2025–26 season, Apollon Paralimnio captured the Serres FCA championship for the fourth time in their history, earning promotion back to the Gamma Ethniki.

== Honours ==
=== Domestic ===
  - Gamma Ethniki: 1
    - 2017–18
  - Serres FCA Champions: 4
    - 2001–02, 2014–15, 2015–16, 2025–26
  - Serres FCA Cup Winners: 10
    - 2000–01, 2001–02, 2004–05, 2012–13, 2014–15, 2017–18, 2021–22, 2022–23, 2023–24, 2024–25
