= 2018–19 Aris Thessaloniki F.C. season =

Aris Thessaloniki
- President: Theodoros A. Karipidis
- Manager: Paco Herrera (until 5 November 2018); Apostolos Terzis (from 6 November 2018 until 13 November 2018); Savvas Pantelidis (from 14 November 2018)
- Stadium: Kleanthis Vikelidis Stadium
- Super League: 5th
- Greek Cup: Group stage
- Top goalscorer: League: Mateo García (10); All: Mateo García (11)
| Home colours | Away colours | Third colours |

The 2018–19 season was the 1st for Aris in the Super League after its return top division of Greece. The club also competed in the Greek Cup and were eliminated in the group stage.

== First-team squad ==
| # | Name | Nationality | Position(s) | Date of birth (age) | Signed from |
Goalkeepers
| 1 | Alexandros Anagnostopoulos | (Greece) | GK | 18 August 1994 (aged 24) | (Greece) Panathinaikos |
| 22 | Giorgos Kantimiris | (Greece) | GK | 19 September 1982 (aged 36) | (Greece) Veria |
| 23 | Julián Cuesta | (Spain) | GK | 28 March 1991 (aged 28) | (Poland) Wisła Kraków |
Defenders
| 2 | Dimitris Konstantinidis | (Greece) | RB / RM / LB | 2 June 1994 (aged 24) | (Italy) Brescia |
| 3 | Hugo Sousa | (Portugal) | CB / RB | 4 June 1992 (aged 26) | Free agent |
| 5 | Georgios Delizisis (captain) | (Greece) | CB | 1 December 1987 (aged 31) | (Greece) Apollon Smyrnis |
| 12 | Charalampos Stamboulidis | (Greece) / (Australia) | CB / RB / LB | 22 June 1996 (aged 22) | (United States) Columbia Lions |
| 15 | Giorgos Valerianos | (Greece) | LB / LM / RB | 13 February 1992 (aged 27) | (Greece) Apollon Smyrnis |
| 27 | Manolis Tzanakakis | (Greece) | RB / RM / LB | 30 April 1992 (aged 27) | (Greece) Olympiacos |
| 40 | Petros Bagalianis | (Greece) | CB | 6 February 2001 (aged 18) | Club's Academy |
| 44 | Fran Vélez | (Spain) | CB / DM | 23 June 1991 (aged 27) | (Poland) Wisła Kraków |
| 69 | Mihály Korhut | (Hungary) | LB / LM | 1 December 1988 (aged 30) | (Israel) Hapoel Be'er Sheva |
| 92 | Lindsay Rose | (Mauritius) / (France) | CB / RB | 8 February 1992 (aged 27) | (France) Lorient |
Midfielders
| 6 | Migjen Basha | (Albania) / (Switzerland) | DM / CM / CB | 5 January 1987 (aged 32) | (Italy) Bari |
| 8 | Lefteris Intzoglou | (Greece) | DM / CM | 3 March 1987 (aged 32) | (Greece) Iraklis |
| 14 | Charalampos Pavlidis (vice-captain) | (Greece) | AM / CM / LM | 6 May 1991 (aged 28) | (Greece) Veria |
| 18 | Nicolás Martínez | (Argentina) / (Italy) | AM / CM / LW | 25 September 1987 (aged 31) | (Greece) Olympiacos |
| 20 | Dimitris Anakoglou | (Greece) | AM / CM | 6 September 1991 (aged 27) | (Greece) AEK Athens |
| 26 | Javier Matilla | (Spain) | CM / DM | 16 August 1988 (aged 30) | (Spain) Gimnàstic de Tarragona |
| 32 | Manolis Siopis | (Greece) | DM / CM | 14 May 1994 (aged 25) | (Greece) Olympiacos |
| 39 | Paraskevas Kallidis | (Greece) | CM | 31 August 1999 (aged 19) | Club's Academy |
| 88 | Kyriakos Savvidis | (Greece) | CM / AM / DM | 20 June 1995 (aged 23) | Free agent |
Forwards
| 7 | Nicolas Diguiny | (France) | SS / RW / LW | 31 May 1988 (aged 31) | (Greece) Atromitos |
| 9 | Martín Tonso | (Argentina) | AM / RW / LW | 19 October 1989 (aged 29) | (Greece) Asteras Tripolis |
| 10 | Daniel Larsson | (Sweden) | LW / RW / ST | 25 January 1987 (aged 32) | (Turkey) Akhisar Belediyespor |
| 11 | Mateo García | (Argentina) | RW / LW | 10 September 1996 (aged 22) | (Spain) Las Palmas |
| 17 | Bruno Gama | (Portugal) | RW / LW / SS | 15 November 1987 (aged 31) | (Spain) Alcorcón |
| 19 | Dimitris Diamantopoulos | (Greece) | ST / RW | 18 November 1988 (aged 30) | (Greece) Apollon Smyrnis |
| 21 | Hamza Younés | (Tunisia) | ST / SS / LW | 16 April 1986 (aged 33) | (Qatar) Al Ahli SC |
| 28 | Giannis Fetfatzidis | (Greece) | LW / RW / AM | 21 December 1990 (aged 28) | (Greece) Olympiacos |
| 84 | Andreas Stamatis | (Greece) | ST / SS | 12 May 1993 (aged 26) | (Greece) Panegialios |

== Transfers and loans ==
=== Transfers in ===
| Entry date | Position | No. | Player | From club | Fee | Ref. |
|---|---|---|---|---|---|---|
| July 2018 | FW | 9 | (Greece) Thomas Nazlidis | (Greece) AEL | Free | |
| July 2018 | FW | 7 | (France) Nicolas Diguiny | (Greece) Atromitos | Free | |
| July 2018 | DF | 31 | (Spain) Álex Menéndez | (Spain) Reus | Free | |
| July 2018 | MF | 26 | (Spain) Javier Matilla | (Spain) Gimnàstic de Tarragona | Free | |
| July 2018 | GK | 23 | (Spain) Julián Cuesta | (Poland) Wisła Kraków | Free | |
| July 2018 | DF | 2 | (Greece) Dimitris Konstantinidis | (Italy) Brescia | Free | |
| July 2018 | FW | 21 | (Tunisia) Hamza Younés | (Qatar) Al Ahli SC | Free | |
| July 2018 | MF | 6 | (Albania) / (Switzerland) Migjen Basha | (Italy) Bari | Free | |
| July 2018 | DF | 44 | (Spain) Fran Vélez | (Poland) Wisła Kraków | Free | |
| July 2018 | DF | 12 | (Greece) / (Australia) Charalampos Stampoulidis | (United States) Columbia Lions | Free | |
| August 2018 | FW | 17 | (Portugal) Bruno Gama | (Spain) Alcorcón | Free | |
| August 2018 | MF | 32 | (Greece) Manolis Siopis | (Greece) Olympiacos | 100.000 € | |
| August 2018 | MF | 18 | (Argentina) / (Portugal) Nicolás Martínez | (Greece) Olympiacos | Free | |
| August 2018 | FW | 28 | (Brazil) Pedro Vitor | (Greece) AEK Athens | Free | |
| September 2018 | DF | 32 | (Albania) / (Germany) Mërgim Mavraj | Free agent | Free | |
| September 2018 | FW | 84 | (Greece) Andreas Stamatis | (Greece) Panegialios | Free | |
| January 2019 | DF | 69 | (Hungary) Mihály Korhut | (Israel) Hapoel Be'er-Sheva | Free | |
| January 2019 | FW | 9 | (Argentina) Martín Tonso | (Greece) Asteras Tripolis | 75.000 € | |
| January 2019 | FW | 10 | (Sweden) Daniel Larsson | (Turkey) Akhisar Belediyespor | Free | |
| January 2019 | MF | 88 | (Greece) Kyriakos Savvidis | Free agent | Free | |
| February 2019 | FW | 28 | (Greece) Giannis Fetfatzidis | (Greece) Olympiacos | Free | |

=== Transfers out ===
| Exit date | Position | No. | Player | To club | Fee | Ref. |
|---|---|---|---|---|---|---|
| July 2018 | FW | 17 | (Greece) Vangelis Platellas | (Greece) OFI | Released | |
| July 2018 | FW | 20 | (Greece) Paschalis Kassos | (Greece) AEL | Released | |
| July 2018 | FW | 99 | (Brazil) Jone Pinto | (Greece) APE Langadas | Released | |
| July 2018 | FW | 33 | (Greece) Aristidis Lottas | (Greece) Olympiacos Volos | Released | |
| July 2018 | MF | 83 | (Bosnia and Herzegovina) / (Serbia) Branislav Nikic | (Greece) Kerkyra | Released | |
| July 2018 | MF | 80 | (Greece) Dimitris Klingopoulos | (Greece) Olympiacos | 300.000 € | |
| August 2018 | GK | 13 | (Greece) Giannis Mantzaris | (Greece) Apollon Larissa | Released | |
| August 2018 | FW | 21 | (Greece) Giannis Pasas | (Greece) Iraklis F.C. | Released | |
| August 2018 | DF | 66 | (Greece) Petros Kanakoudis | (Greece) Iraklis F.C. | Released | |
| August 2018 | FW | 7 | (Greece) Markos Dounis | (Greece) Iraklis F.C. | Released | |
| August 2018 | DF | 4 | (Greece) Stelios Marangos | (Greece) Veria | Released | |
| August 2018 | MF | 6 | (Greece) Houssein Moumin | (Greece) Iraklis F.C. | Released | |
| August 2018 | FW | 16 | (Serbia) Luka Milunović | (Serbia) Voždovac | Released | |
| September 2018 | FW | 89 | (Jordan) / (Greece) Angelos Chanti | (Greece) Aittitos Spata | Released | |
| September 2018 | DF | 18 | (Greece) Nikos Tsoumanis | (Greece) Apollon Pontus | Released | |
| September 2018 | FW | 11 | (Greece) Kenan Bargan | (Greece) AEL | Released | |
| September 2018 | FW | 9 | (Greece) Michalis Bastakos | (Greece) Panachaiki | Released | |
| January 2019 | DF | 31 | (Albania) / (Germany) Mërgim Mavraj | (Germany) FC Ingolstadt 04 | 70.000 € | |
| January 2019 | FW | 9 | (Greece) Thomas Nazlidis | (Greece) Apollon Smyrnis | Released | |
| February 2019 | FW | 28 | (Brazil) Pedro Vitor | (Ukraine) FC Lviv | Released | |

=== Loans in ===
| Start date | End date | Position | No. | Player | From club | Fee | Ref. |
|---|---|---|---|---|---|---|---|
| July 2018 | End of season | FW | 11 | (Argentina) Mateo García | (Spain) Las Palmas | None | |
| July 2018 | January 2019 | MF | 10 | (Argentina) / (Italy) Nicolás Colazo | (Argentina) Boca Juniors | None | |
| January 2019 | End of season | DF | 92 | (Mauritius) / (France) Lindsay Rose | (France) Lorient | None | |

=== Loans out ===
| Start date | End date | Position | No. | Player | To club | Fee | Ref. |
|---|---|---|---|---|---|---|---|
| January 2019 | End of season | DF | 31 | (Spain) Álex Menéndez | (Spain) Córdoba | None | |

=== Transfer summary ===
Spending

Summer: ▼100.000 €

Winter: ▼75.000 €

Total: ▼175.000 €

Income

Summer: ▲300.000 €

Winter: ▲70.000 €

Total: ▲370.000 €

Net Expenditure

Summer: ▲200.000 €

Winter: ▼5.000 €

Total: ▲195.000 €

== Competitions ==
=== Overall ===
| Competition | Started round | Current position / round | Final position / round | First match | Last match |
|---|---|---|---|---|---|
| Super League | Matchday 1 | — | 5th | 27 August 2018 | 5 May 2019 |
| Greek Cup | Group stage | — | Group stage | 26 September 2018 | 27 December 2018 |

Updated to match played 5 May 2019
Source: Competitions

=== Overview ===
| Competition | Record | | | | | | | |
| Competition | G | W | D | L | GF | GA | GD | Win % |
|---|---|---|---|---|---|---|---|---|
| Super League | 30 | 15 | 4 | 11 | 46 | 33 | +13 | 50.00 |
| Greek Cup | 3 | 1 | 1 | 1 | 5 | 5 | +0 | 33.33 |
| Total | 33 | 16 | 5 | 12 | 51 | 38 | +13 | 48.48 |

Updated to match played 5 May 2019
Source: Competitions

==== Managers' Overview ====
| Manager | Nat. | From | Until | Record | | | | | | | |
| Manager | Nat. | From | Until | G | W | D | L | GF | GA | GD | Win % |
|---|---|---|---|---|---|---|---|---|---|---|---|
| Paco Herrera | (Spain) | Start of Season | 5 November 2018 | 11 | 5 | 1 | 5 | 13 | 11 | +2 | 45.45 |
| Apostolos Terzis | (Greece) | 6 November 2018 | 13 November 2018 | 1 | 1 | 0 | 0 | 2 | 1 | +1 | 100.00 |
| Savvas Pantelidis | (Greece) | 14 November 2018 | End of Season | 21 | 10 | 4 | 7 | 36 | 26 | +10 | 47.62 |

Updated to match played 5 May 2019
Source: Competitions

=== Super League ===
==== League table ====
| Pos | Team | Pld | W | D | L | GF | GA | GD | Pts | Qualification or relegation |
|---|---|---|---|---|---|---|---|---|---|---|
| 3 | AEK Athens (Note: AEK Athens were deducted 3 points by court decision.) | 30 | 18 | 6 | 6 | 50 | 19 | +31 | 57 | Qualification for the Europa League third qualifying round |
| 4 | Atromitos | 30 | 15 | 7 | 8 | 41 | 28 | +13 | 52 | Qualification for the Europa League second qualifying round |
| 5 | Aris | 30 | 15 | 4 | 11 | 46 | 33 | +13 | 49 | Qualification for the Europa League second qualifying round |
| 6 | Panionios | 30 | 11 | 5 | 14 | 27 | 45 | −18 | 38 | |
| 7 | Lamia | 30 | 9 | 10 | 11 | 28 | 37 | −9 | 37 | |

Source: Super League Greece
Rules for classification: 1) Points; 2) Head-to-head points; 3) Head-to-head goal difference; 4) Goal difference; 5) Goals scored; 6) Goals against 7) Play-offs (neutral ground); 8) Draw.
(Note: Criteria 7 is only used if needed to decide champion, teams for relegation or teams for UEFA competitions).

==== Results summary ====
| Overall | | | | | | | | Home | | | | | | Away | | | | | |
| Pld | W | D | L | GF | GA | GD | Pts | W | D | L | GF | GA | GD | W | D | L | GF | GA | GD |
|---|---|---|---|---|---|---|---|---|---|---|---|---|---|---|---|---|---|---|---|
| 30 | 15 | 4 | 11 | 46 | 33 | +13 | 49 | 9 | 2 | 4 | 29 | 12 | +17 | 6 | 2 | 7 | 17 | 21 | −4 |

Last updated: 5 May 2019.
Source: Super League

==== Results by matchday ====
| Matchday | 1 | 2 | 3 | 4 | 5 | 6 | 7 | 8 | 9 | 10 | 11 | 12 | 13 | 14 | 15 | 16 | 17 | 18 | 19 | 20 | 21 | 22 | 23 | 24 | 25 | 26 | 27 | 28 | 29 | 30 |
|---|---|---|---|---|---|---|---|---|---|---|---|---|---|---|---|---|---|---|---|---|---|---|---|---|---|---|---|---|---|---|
| Ground | A | H | H | A | H | A | H | A | H | A | A | H | A | H | H | A | A | A | H | A | H | A | H | A | H | H | A | H | A | H |
| Result | W | W | W | L | W | L | L | L | L | W | W | D | L | L | W | D | L | W | W | W | D | D | W | L | W | W | L | L | W | W |
| Position | 1 | 2 | 2 | 4 | 3 | 4 | 5 | 7 | 7 | 6 | 4 | 5 | 5 | 6 | 5 | 5 | 5 | 5 | 5 | 5 | 5 | 5 | 5 | 5 | 5 | 5 | 5 | 5 | 5 | 5 |

Updated to match(es) played on 5 May 2019. Source:
A = Away; H = Home; W = Win; D = Draw; L = Loss; P = Postponed
- Due to the postponement of 15th matchday: No 15 corresponds to 16th matchday, No 16 to 17th matchday, No 17 to 17th matchday, No 18 to 18th matchday and No 19 to 15th matchday

==== Matches ====
| 27 August 2018 1 | Lamia | 0 – 3 | Aris Thessaloniki | Lamia |
| 21:30 EEST | Elini Dimoutsos (yellow card) 42'; Thanasis Karagounis (yellow card) 52'; Marko Blažić (yellow card) 67' | Report | Hamza Younés (yellow card) 48'; Nicolas Diguiny 53'; Migjen Basha (yellow card) 65'; Mateo García 71'; Bruno Gama 78' | Stadium: Lamia Municipal Stadium; Attendance: 1,572; Referee: Aristotelis Diamantopoulos |

| 2 September 2018 2 | Aris Thessaloniki | 2 – 0 | AEL | Thessaloniki |
| 19:15 EEST | Giorgos Delizisis (yellow card) 29'; Hamza Younés 71'; Nicolas Diguiny 75' | Report | Fatjon Andoni (yellow card) 28'; Nikos Golias (yellow card) 63'; Piti (yellow card) 70'; Radomir Milosavljević (yellow card) 74'; Aleksandar Gojković (yellow card) 78'; Hristofor Hubchev (yellow card) 86' | Stadium: Kaftanzoglio Stadium; Attendance: 11,671; Referee: Georgios Tzovaras |

| 17 September 2018 3 | Aris Thessaloniki | 2 – 0 | Levadiakos | Thessaloniki |
| 19:00 EEST | Hamza Younés 22' (pen.); Fran Vélez (yellow card) 32'; Giorgos Delizisis (yellow card) 46'; Mateo García 57'; Bruno Gama (yellow card) 63' | Report | Lenny Nangis (yellow card) 36'; Pavlos Mitropoulos (yellow card) 63'; João Favaro (yellow card) 81'; Chumbinho (yellow card) 83' | Stadium: Kleanthis Vikelidis Stadium; Attendance: 13,904; Referee: Georgios Tassis |

| 22 September 2018 4 | PAS Giannina | 1 – 0 | Aris Thessaloniki | Ioannina |
| 20:30 EEST | Marcos Vellidis (yellow card) 33'; Giorgos Delizisis 65' (o.g.); Apostolos Skondras (yellow card) 71' | Report | Bruno Gama (yellow card) 24' | Stadium: Zosimades Stadium; Attendance: 2,924; Referee: Evangelos Gratsanis |

| 30 September 2018 5 | Aris Thessaloniki | 2 – 0 | Asteras Tripolis | Thessaloniki |
| 19:00 EEST | Mateo García (yellow card) 19', (goal) 90+3'; Thomas Nazlidis (yellow card) 50'; Hamza Younés 87' (pen.) | Report | Valentinos Vlachos (yellow card) 39'; Walter Iglesias (yellow card) 58'; Nikos Papadopoulos (yellow card) 86' | Stadium: Kleanthis Vikelidis Stadium; Attendance: 6,327; Referee: Stefanos Koubarakis |

| 6 October 2018 6 | Panionios | 1 – 0 | Aris Thessaloniki | Athens |
| 18:15 EEST | Luiz Gustavo Domingues 41'; Georgios Masouras (yellow card) 64'; Abdoulaye Keita (yellow card) 66'; Amiri Kurdi (yellow card) 79'; Giorgos Manthatis (yellow card) 90' | Report | Javier Matilla (yellow card) 55'; Hugo Sousa (yellow card) 90+2' | Stadium: Nea Smyrni Stadium; Attendance: 2,373; Referee: Georgios Kominis |

| 21 October 2018 7 | Aris Thessaloniki | 1 – 2 | PAOK | Thessaloniki |
| 19:00 EEST | Mateo García 2'; Giorgos Valerianos (yellow card) 20'; Migjen Basha (yellow card) 37'; Manolis Siopis (yellow card) 67' | Report | Aleksandar Prijović (yellow card) 19', (goal) 36' (pen.), 84'; José Cañas (yellow card) 37'; Amr Warda (yellow card) 58'; Pontus Wernbloom (yellow card) 70'; Vieirinha (yellow card) 78'; Diego Biseswar (yellow card) 90+2' | Stadium: Kleanthis Vikelidis Stadium; Attendance: 16,434; Referee: Daniele Doveri (Italy) |

| 28 October 2018 8 | AEK Athens | 4 – 0 | Aris Thessaloniki | Athens |
| 19:30 EEST | Lucas Boyé 5'; Ezequiel Ponce 56', 62'; Marko Livaja 72'; Petros Mantalos (yellow card) 87' | Report | Dimitris Konstantinidis (yellow card) 16'; Nicolás Colazo (yellow card) 23'; Nicolas Diguiny (yellow card) 65'; Javier Matilla (yellow card) 87' | Stadium: Athens Olympic Stadium; Attendance: 0 Referee: Athanassios Tzilos |

| 4 November 2018 9 | Aris Thessaloniki | 0 – 1 | Olympiacos | Thessaloniki |
| 19:00 EEST | Hamza Younés (yellow card) 4'; Hugo Sousa (yellow card) 40'; Nicolas Diguiny (yellow card) 73' | Report | Guilherme (yellow card) 16'; Kostas Fortounis (yellow card) 46'; Lazaros Christodoulopoulos (yellow card) 51'; Ahmed Hassan 67'; Omar Elabdellaoui (yellow card) 71' | Stadium: Kleanthis Vikelidis Stadium; Attendance: 8,243; Referee: Anastasios Sidiropoulos |

| 12 November 2018 10 | Apollon Smyrnis | 1 – 2 | Aris Thessaloniki | Athens |
| 19:00 EEST | Andrej Lukić (yellow card) 6'; Panagiotis Triadis 45'; Michalis Kyrgias (yellow card) 68' | Report | Mateo García 1'; Migjen Basha (yellow card) 15'; Dimitris Konstantinidis (yellow card) 30'; Bruno Gama 69'; Giorgos Valerianos (yellow card) 85' | Stadium: Georgios Kamaras Stadium; Attendance: 912; Referee: Konstantinos Kotsanis |

| 25 November 2018 11 | OFI | 1 – 2 | Aris Thessaloniki | Heraklion |
| 19:30 EEST | Anestis Nastos (yellow card) 3'; Nikos Korovesis (yellow card) 40'; Pavlos Kyriakidis (yellow card) 73'; Ismail Sassi 75' | Report | Bruno Gama (yellow card) 62'; Hamza Younés 90+3', 90+4'; Dimitris Konstantinidis (yellow card) 90+7' | Stadium: Theodoros Vardinogiannis Stadium; Attendance: 2,432; Referee: Athanassios Tzilos |

| 2 December 2018 12 | Aris Thessaloniki | 1 – 1 | Panathinaikos | Thessaloniki |
| 19:00 EEST | Hamza Younés 15' (pen.); Javier Matilla (yellow card) 85'; Manolis Siopis (yellow card) 90+2' | Report | Federico Macheda (yellow card) 18' (yellow-red card) 89'; Emanuel Insúa (yellow card) 35'; Dimitrios Kourbelis (yellow card) 85'; Ilias Chatzitheodoridis 90+3' (pen.), (yellow card) 90+4' | Stadium: Kleanthis Vikelidis Stadium; Attendance: 9,498; Referee: Georgios Tzovaras |

| 9 December 2018 13 | Atromitos | 4 – 2 | Aris Thessaloniki | Athens |
| 19:00 EEST | Emanuel Sakic 16'; Azer Bušuladžić (yellow card) 27'; Madson (yellow card) 38'; Theodoros Vasilakakis (yellow card) 54'; Efthymis Koulouris 59', 90+1'; Clarck N'Sikulu 90+4' | Report | Migjen Basha (yellow card) 38'; Manolis Siopis (yellow card) 43'; Manolis Tzanakakis (yellow card) 61'; Fran Vélez (yellow card) 64'; Dimitris Konstantinidis 89'; Dimitris Diamantopoulos 90+2' | Stadium: Peristeri Stadium; Attendance: 860; Referee: Aristomenis Koutsiaftis |

| 15 December 2018 14 | Aris Thessaloniki | 1 – 2 | Panetolikos | Thessaloniki |
| 19:00 EEST | Julián Cuesta (red card) 28'; Dimitris Konstantinidis (yellow card) 56'; Nicolas Diguiny 71', (yellow card) 79' | Report | Alhassan Kamara (yellow card) 11'; Alexandros Malis (yellow card) 58', (goal) 63'; Giorgos Liavas (yellow card) 59'; Adrián Lucero 75'; Willyan (yellow card) 78'; Dimitris Kyriakidis (yellow card) 90+3'; Angelos Tsingaras (yellow card) 90+4' | Stadium: Kleanthis Vikelidis Stadium; Attendance: 5,651; Referee: Angelos Evangelou |

| 14 January 2019 16 | Aris Thessaloniki | 1 – 0 | Lamia | Thessaloniki |
| 19:00 EEST | Lefteris Intzoglou (yellow card) 37'; Javier Matilla 90+2' | Report | Facundo Bertoglio (yellow card) 11'; Joan Tomàs (yellow card) 49'; Vasilis Pliatsikas (yellow card) 59'; Stavros Vasilantonopoulos (yellow card) 62'; Jerónimo Barrales (yellow card) 81'; Mark Asigba (yellow card) 90+2' | Stadium: Kleanthis Vikelidis Stadium; Attendance: 4,501; Referee: Evangelos Manouhos |

| 20 January 2019 17 | AEL | 0 – 0 | Aris Thessaloniki | Larissa |
| 17:15 EEST | Migjen Basha (yellow card) 26'; Manolis Tzanakakis (yellow card) 55'; Lefteris Intzoglou (yellow card) 65' | Report | Fatjon Andoni (yellow card) 60'; Adnan Šećerović (yellow card) 67'; Miloš Deletić (yellow card) 82'; Yevgeniy Shikavka (yellow card) 87' | Stadium: AEL FC Arena; Attendance: 2,569; Referee: Fotios Fotiadis |

| 27 January 2019 18 | Levadiakos | 1 – 0 | Aris Thessaloniki | Livadeia |
| 19:00 EEST | Benjamin Angoua (yellow card) 33'; Emmanuel Koné (yellow card) 36'; Marko Markovski 38' | Report | Manolis Siopis (yellow card) 73' | Stadium: Levadia Municipal Stadium; Attendance: 1,405; Referee: Athanasios Sezos |

| 31 January 2019 15 (Note: Due to the attack in the referee Athanasios Tzilos the Matchday 15 was postponed and rescheduled from December 22 and 23 on January 30 and 31) | Xanthi | 0 – 1 | Aris Thessaloniki | Xanthi |
| 19:00 EEST | Salimo Sylla (yellow card) 19'; Khassa Camara (yellow card) 39'; Dimos Baxevanidis (yellow card) 72'; Živko Živković (yellow card) 90+5' | Report | Migjen Basha (yellow card) 32'; Mateo García 37', (yellow card) 62'; Dimitris Diamantopoulos (yellow card) 40'; Giorgos Delizisis (yellow card) 65'; Manolis Tzanakakis (yellow card) 86'; Julián Cuesta (yellow card) 90+2'; Nicolás Martínez (yellow card) 90+4' | Stadium: Xanthi FC Arena; Attendance: 1,299; Referee: Georgios Tassis |

| 3 February 2019 19 | Aris Thessaloniki | 1 – 0 | PAS Giannina | Thessaloniki |
| 19:00 EEST | Daniel Larsson (yellow card) 44'; Manolis Tzanakakis (yellow card) 47'; Dimitris Diamantopoulos (yellow card) 72'; Mateo García 76' | Report | Fabry Castro (yellow card) 22'; Themistoklis Tzimopoulos (yellow card) 25'; Marcos Vellidis (yellow card) 34'; Stefanos Athanasiadis (yellow card) 70' | Stadium: Kleanthis Vikelidis Stadium; Attendance: 7,167; Referee: Stefanos Koubarakis |

| 11 February 2019 20 | Asteras Tripolis | 0 – 3 | Aris Thessaloniki | Tripoli |
| 19:30 EEST | Nikos Kaltsas (yellow card) 29'; Giannis Kotsiras (yellow card) 54' | Report | Daniel Larsson 9'; Nicolas Diguiny 23'; Mateo García 45+1' | Stadium: Theodoros Kolokotronis Stadium; Attendance: 1,471; Referee: Evangelos Manouhos |

| 17 February 2019 21 | Aris Thessaloniki | 1 – 1 | Panionios | Thessaloniki |
| 18:00 EEST | Migjen Basha (red card) 11'; Javier Matilla 48' | Report | Sotiris Tsiloulis (yellow card) 33', (goal) 56'; Pedro Arce (yellow card) 54'; Dimitrios Stavropoulos (yellow card) 78' | Stadium: Kleanthis Vikelidis Stadium; Attendance: 9,408; Referee: Aristomenis Koutsiaftis |

| 24 February 2019 22 | PAOK | 1 – 1 | Aris Thessaloniki | Thessaloniki |
| 19:30 EEST | Fernando Varela (yellow card) 36'; Vieirinha 39'; Diego Biseswar (yellow card) 45+1'; Léo Matos (yellow card) 52' | Report | Manolis Tzanakakis (yellow card) 21'; Fran Vélez (yellow card) 65', (goal) 85'; Mihály Korhut (yellow card) 74' | Stadium: Toumba Stadium; Attendance: 22,544; Referee: Tore Hansen (Norway) |

| 2 March 2019 23 | Aris Thessaloniki | 2 – 0 | AEK Athens | Thessaloniki |
| 19:00 EEST | Daniel Larsson 32'; Nicolas Diguiny (yellow card) 43'; Lindsay Rose 69'; Giorgos Valerianos (yellow card) 73' | Report | Alef (yellow card) 16'; Ezequiel Ponce (yellow card) 67'; André Simões (yellow card) 75'; Uroš Ćosić (yellow card) 82' | Stadium: Kleanthis Vikelidis Stadium; Attendance: 9,668; Referee: Aristotelis Diamantopoulos |

| 10 March 2019 24 | Olympiacos | 4 – 1 | Aris Thessaloniki | Piraeus |
| 19:30 EEST | Guilherme (yellow card) 25'; Georgios Masouras 27'; Ahmed Hassan (yellow card) 31'; Daniel Podence 35', 75'; Miguel Ángel Guerrero 90' | Report | Manolis Siopis (yellow card) 38'; Fran Vélez (yellow card) 44'; Nicolás Martínez 74' | Stadium: Karaiskakis Stadium; Attendance: 19,172; Referee: Anastasios Sidiropoulos |

| 18 March 2019 25 | Aris Thessaloniki | 5 – 0 | Apollon Smyrnis | Thessaloniki |
| 19:00 EEST | Nicolas Diguiny 8' (pen.), 63'; Daniel Larsson (yellow card) 16'; Martín Tonso 54'; Hamza Younés 81'; Giannis Fetfatzidis 86' | Report | Nikos Vafeas (yellow card) 7' | Stadium: Kleanthis Vikelidis Stadium; Attendance: 7,032; Referee: Georgios Labrou |

| 31 March 2019 26 | Aris Thessaloniki | 3 – 1 | OFI | Thessaloniki |
| 16:00 EEST | Julián Cuesta (yellow card) 9'; Manolis Siopis (yellow card) 64'; Lindsay Rose 76'; Javier Matilla 89'; Nicolás Martínez 90+4' | Report | Pavlos Kyriakidis (yellow card) 20'; Ricardo Vaz 26', (yellow card) 65'; Marko Mihojević (yellow card) 28'; Ioannis Potouridis (yellow card) 42'; Kostas Giannoulis (yellow card) 90+4' | Stadium: Kleanthis Vikelidis Stadium; Attendance: 9,283; Referee: Athanasios Sezos |

| 6 April 2019 27 | Panathinaikos | 2 – 0 | Aris Thessaloniki | Athens |
| 19:00 EEST | Achilleas Poungouras (yellow card) 38'; Christos Donis 62'; Emanuel Insúa 74', (yellow card) 90+3'; Federico Macheda (yellow card) 84'; Sokratis Dioudis (yellow card) 90+2' | Report | Giorgos Valerianos (yellow card) 52'; Daniel Larsson (yellow card) 80' | Stadium: Athens Olympic Stadium; Attendance: 0 Referee: Emmanouil Skoulas |

| 14 April 2019 28 | Aris Thessaloniki | 0 – 2 | Atromitos | Thessaloniki |
| 19:00 EEST | Fran Vélez (yellow card) 87' | Report | Giorgos Manousos 17', (yellow card) 58'; Kyriakos Kivrakidis (yellow card) 31'; Efthymis Koulouris 36'; Azer Bušuladžić (yellow card) 44'; Madson (yellow card) 80'; Aristotelis Karasalidis (yellow card) 90+2' | Stadium: Kleanthis Vikelidis Stadium; Attendance: 8,139; Referee: Aristotelis Diamantopoulos |

| 21 April 2019 29 | Panetolikos | 1 – 2 | Aris Thessaloniki | Agrinio |
| 19:00 EEST | Frederico Duarte 48'; Jorge Díaz (yellow card) 52'; Nikos Marinakis (yellow card) 77' | Report | Hugo Sousa (yellow card) 17'; Nicolás Martínez 22'; Fran Vélez (yellow card) 51'; Hamza Younés 86'; Daniel Larsson (yellow card) 87' | Stadium: Panetolikos Stadium; Attendance: 2,276; Referee: Fotios Fotiadis |

| 5 May 2019 30 | Aris Thessaloniki | 7 – 2 | Xanthi | Thessaloniki |
| 19:00 EEST | Hamza Younés 27'; Mateo García 33', 82'; Javier Matilla (yellow card) 50'; Manolis Tzanakakis (yellow card) 52'; Nicolas Diguiny 69', 79'; Mihály Korhut 73'; Manolis Siopis 90+5' (pen.) | Report | Matías Gastón Castro 15' (pen.); Jean Barrientos (yellow card) 43'; Petar Đuričković 50'; Pablo de Lucas (yellow card) 81'; Dimos Baxevanidis (yellow card) 90+3' | Stadium: Kleanthis Vikelidis Stadium; Attendance: 6,856; Referee: Georgios Tassis |

=== Greek Cup ===
Aris Thessaloniki entered the competition in the group stage, in the Pot 2, because it promoted from the Football League Football League . The final five clubs of the last Super League are introduced to the tournament in the Round of 16 and they are seeded in the draw. In the draws for the quarter-finals onwards, there are no seedings.

==== Group stage ====
Group D
| Pos | Team | Pld | W | D | L | GF | GA | GD | Pts | Qualification |
|---|---|---|---|---|---|---|---|---|---|---|
| 1 | PAOK | 3 | 2 | 1 | 0 | 9 | 2 | +7 | 7 | Round of 16 |
| 2 | Ergotelis | 3 | 1 | 1 | 1 | 5 | 5 | 0 | 4 | Round of 16 |
| 3 | Aris | 3 | 1 | 1 | 1 | 5 | 5 | 0 | 4 | |
| 4 | Aittitos Spata | 3 | 0 | 1 | 2 | 2 | 9 | −7 | 1 | |

Source: epo.gr
Rules for classification: 1. Points 2. Head-to-head points 3. Head-to-head goal difference 4. Goals scored 5. Goals against 6. Play-offs (neutral ground).

===== Matches =====
| 26 September 2018 1 | PAOK | 1 – 1 | Aris Thessaloniki | Thessaloniki |
| 19:00 EEST | Stelios Kitsiou (yellow card) 3' (yellow-red card) 58'; Dimitrios Pelkas 25' (pen.); Omar El Kaddouri (yellow card) 45'; Pontus Wernbloom (yellow card) 87' | Report | Hamza Younés (yellow card) 14'; Manolis Siopis (yellow card) 43'; Mateo García 45+2'; Nicolás Colazo (yellow card) 81' | Stadium: Toumba Stadium; Referee: Anastasios Sidiropoulos |

| 31 October 2018 2 | Aris Thessaloniki | 2 – 1 | Aittitos Spata | Thessaloniki |
| 21:30 EEST | Dimitris Diamantopoulos 67', 77' | Report | Antonis Mangas (yellow card) 87'; Angelos Chanti 90' | Stadium: Kleanthis Vikelidis Stadium; Referee: Vassilios Fotias |

| 20 December 2018 3 | Ergotelis | 3 – 2 | Aris Thessaloniki | Heraklion |
| 21:30 EEST | Antonis Bourselis 44'; Giannis Iatroudis 50'; Joseph Efford 53'; Albert Bruce (yellow card) 72'; Ilias Tselios (yellow card) 76'; Issahaku Yakubu (yellow card) 90+3' | Report | Nicolas Diguiny 57', 74' (pen.); Mateo García (yellow card) 61' | Stadium: Pankritio Stadium; Referee: Athanasios Sezos |

== Squad statistics ==
=== Appearances ===
As of match played 5 May 2019

| # | Position | Nat. | Player | Super League | | Greek Cup | | Total | |
| # | Position | Nat. | Player | Apps | Starts | Apps | Starts | Apps | Starts |
|---|---|---|---|---|---|---|---|---|---|
| 1 | GK | (Greece) | Alexandros Anagnostopoulos | 1 | 0 | 1 | 1 | 2 | 1 |
| 2 | DF | (Greece) | Dimitris Konstantinidis | 9 | 7 | 0 | 0 | 9 | 7 |
| 3 | DF | (Portugal) | Hugo Sousa | 7 | 2 | 2 | 2 | 9 | 4 |
| 5 | DF | (Greece) | Giorgos Delizisis | 20 | 20 | 2 | 1 | 22 | 21 |
| 6 | MF | (Albania) / (Switzerland) | Migjen Basha | 21 | 19 | 2 | 1 | 23 | 20 |
| 7 | FW | (France) | Nicolas Diguiny | 27 | 27 | 3 | 1 | 30 | 28 |
| 8 | MF | (Greece) | Lefteris Intzoglou | 4 | 1 | 1 | 1 | 5 | 2 |
| 9 | FW | (Argentina) | Martín Tonso | 5 | 4 | 0 | 0 | 5 | 4 |
| 10 | FW | (Sweden) | Daniel Larsson | 13 | 11 | 0 | 0 | 13 | 11 |
| 11 | FW | (Argentina) | Mateo García | 30 | 30 | 2 | 1 | 32 | 31 |
| 12 | DF | (Greece) / (Australia) | Charalampos Stamboulidis | 0 | 0 | 0 | 0 | 0 | 0 |
| 14 | MF | (Greece) | Charalampos Pavlidis | 3 | 0 | 1 | 1 | 4 | 1 |
| 15 | DF | (Greece) | Giorgos Valerianos | 18 | 14 | 0 | 0 | 18 | 14 |
| 17 | FW | (Portugal) | Bruno Gama | 14 | 14 | 2 | 2 | 16 | 16 |
| 18 | MF | (Argentina) / (Portugal) | Nicolás Martínez | 21 | 7 | 2 | 2 | 23 | 9 |
| 19 | FW | (Greece) | Dimitris Diamantopoulos | 5 | 2 | 1 | 0 | 6 | 2 |
| 20 | MF | (Greece) | Dimitris Anakoglou | 0 | 0 | 0 | 0 | 0 | 0 |
| 21 | FW | (Tunisia) | Hamza Younés | 24 | 15 | 3 | 3 | 27 | 18 |
| 22 | GK | (Greece) | Giorgos Kantimiris | 0 | 0 | 1 | 1 | 1 | 1 |
| 23 | GK | (Spain) | Julián Cuesta | 30 | 30 | 1 | 1 | 31 | 31 |
| 26 | MF | (Spain) | Javier Matilla | 29 | 20 | 2 | 2 | 31 | 22 |
| 27 | DF | (Greece) | Manolis Tzanakakis | 21 | 19 | 2 | 2 | 23 | 21 |
| 28 | FW | (Greece) | Giannis Fetfatzidis | 10 | 4 | 0 | 0 | 10 | 4 |
| 32 | MF | (Greece) | Manolis Siopis | 25 | 22 | 2 | 1 | 27 | 23 |
| 39 | MF | (Greece) | Paraskevas Kallidis | 0 | 0 | 0 | 0 | 0 | 0 |
| 40 | DF | (Greece) | Petros Bagalianis | 0 | 0 | 0 | 0 | 0 | 0 |
| 44 | DF | (Spain) | Fran Vélez | 23 | 20 | 2 | 2 | 25 | 22 |
| 69 | DF | (Hungary) | Mihály Korhut | 14 | 13 | 0 | 0 | 14 | 13 |
| 84 | FW | (Greece) | Andreas Stamatis | 0 | 0 | 0 | 0 | 0 | 0 |
| 88 | MF | (Greece) | Kyriakos Savvidis | 0 | 0 | 0 | 0 | 0 | 0 |
| 92 | DF | (Mauritius) / (France) | Lindsay Rose | 13 | 13 | 0 | 0 | 13 | 13 |
Players who left the club during this season
| | FW | (Greece) | Thomas Nazlidis | 7 | 0 | 2 | 1 | 9 | 1 |
| | FW | (Argentina) / (Italy) | Nicolás Colazo | 8 | 5 | 2 | 2 | 10 | 7 |
| | FW | (Brazil) | Pedro Vitor | 0 | 0 | 1 | 0 | 1 | 0 |
| | DF | (Spain) | Álex Menéndez | 11 | 7 | 3 | 3 | 14 | 10 |
| | DF | (Albania) / (Germany) | Mërgim Mavraj | 5 | 4 | 2 | 2 | 7 | 6 |
| Total | | | | 30 | | 3 | | 33 | |

=== Goals ===
As of match played 5 May 2019

| Ranking | Position | Nat. | Player | Super League | Greek Cup | Total |
|---|---|---|---|---|---|---|
| 1 | FW | (Argentina) | Mateo García | 10 | 1 | 11 |
| 2 | FW | (France) | Nicolas Diguiny | 8 | 2 | 10 |
| 3 | FW | (Tunisia) | Hamza Younés | 9 | 0 | 9 |
| 4 | MF | (Spain) | Javier Matilla | 3 | 0 | 3 |
| 4 | FW | (Argentina) | Nicolás Martínez | 3 | 0 | 3 |
| 4 | FW | (Greece) | Dimitris Diamantopoulos | 1 | 2 | 3 |
| 7 | FW | (Portugal) | Bruno Gama | 2 | 0 | 2 |
| 7 | DF | (Mauritius) | Lindsay Rose | 2 | 0 | 2 |
| 7 | FW | (Sweden) | Daniel Larsson | 2 | 0 | 2 |
| 10 | MF | (Greece) | Manolis Siopis | 1 | 0 | 1 |
| 10 | DF | (Spain) | Fran Vélez | 1 | 0 | 1 |
| 10 | MF | (Greece) | Dimitris Konstantinidis | 1 | 0 | 1 |
| 10 | DF | (Hungary) | Mihály Korhut | 1 | 0 | 1 |
| 10 | FW | (Greece) | Giannis Fetfatzidis | 1 | 0 | 1 |
| 10 | FW | (Argentina) | Martín Tonso | 1 | 0 | 1 |
| Own Goals | | | | 0 | 0 | 0 |
| Total | | | | 46 | 5 | 51 |

=== Clean sheets ===
As of match played 5 May 2019

| # | Nat. | Player | Super League | Greek Cup | Total |
|---|---|---|---|---|---|
| 23 | (Spain) | Julián Cuesta | 12 | 0 | 12 |
| Total | | | 12 | 0 | 12 |
