= 2017–18 Aris Thessaloniki F.C. season =

Aris Thessaloniki
- President: Theodoros A. Karipidis
- Manager: Dimitrios Spanos
- Stadium: Kleanthis Vikelidis Stadium
- Football League: 2nd (promoted)
- Greek Cup: Group Stage
- Top goalscorer: League: Dimitris Diamantopoulos (16); All: Dimitris Diamantopoulos (16)
Home colours	Away colours

The 2017–18 season Aris participated in Football League, finished in the second place and were promoted to Super League. The club also competed in the Greek Cup and were eliminated in Group Stage.

== First-team squad ==
#	Name	Nationality	Position(s)	Date of birth (age)	Signed from
Goalkeepers
1	Alexandros Anagnostopoulos	(Greece)	GK	18 August 1994 (aged 23)	(Greece) Panathinaikos
13	Giannis Mantzaris	(Greece)	GK	15 April 1996 (aged 22)	(Greece) APE Langadas
22	Georgios Kantimiris	(Greece)	GK	19 September 1982 (aged 35)	(Greece) Veria
Defenders
2	Darcy Dolce Neto	(Brazil)	RB / RW	7 February 1981 (aged 37)	(Greece) Veria
3	Hugo Sousa	(Portugal)	CB / RB	4 June 1992 (aged 25)	Free agent
4	Stelios Marangos	(Greece)	CB / DM	4 May 1989 (aged 29)	(Greece) Platanias
5	Georgios Delizisis (captain)	(Greece)	CB	1 December 1987 (aged 30)	(Greece) Apollon Smyrnis
15	Giorgos Valerianos	(Greece)	LB / LM / RB	13 February 1992 (aged 26)	(Greece) Apollon Smyrnis
18	Nikos Tsoumanis	(Greece)	LB / LM	8 June 1990 (aged 27)	(Greece) Veria
27	Manolis Tzanakakis	(Greece)	RB / RM / LB	30 April 1992 (aged 26)	(Greece) Olympiacos
28	Christos Bourbos	(Greece)	RB / RM	1 June 1983 (aged 34)	Free agent
66	Petros Kanakoudis	(Greece)	LB / LM	16 April 1984 (aged 34)	(Finland) Inter Turku
Midfielders
6	Houssein Moumin	(Greece)	DM / CM	5 January 1987 (aged 31)	(Greece) Trikala
8	Lefteris Intzoglou	(Greece)	DM / CM	3 March 1987 (aged 31)	(Greece) Iraklis
10	Dimitris Anakoglou	(Greece)	AM / CM	6 September 1991 (aged 26)	(Greece) AEK Athens
14	Charalampos Pavlidis	(Greece)	AM / CM / LM	6 May 1991 (aged 27)	(Greece) Veria
80	Dimitris Klingopoulos	(Greece)	DM / CM	9 March 1998 (aged 20)	Club's Academy
83	Branislav Nikic	(Bosnia and Herzegovina) / (Serbia)	DM / CM	15 August 1983 (aged 34)	(Greece) Veria
Forwards
7	Markos Dounis	(Greece)	RW / LW / AM	9 May 1992 (aged 26)	(Greece) AEK Athens
9	Michalis Bastakos	(Greece)	ST	27 July 1996 (aged 21)	(Greece) Atromitos
11	Kenan Bargan (vice-captain)	(Greece)	LW / SS	25 October 1988 (aged 29)	(Greece) Panionios
16	Luka Milunović	(Serbia)	AM / LW / RW	21 December 1992 (aged 25)	(Greece) Platanias
17	Vangelis Platellas	(Greece)	RW / LW / AM	1 December 1988 (aged 29)	(Greece) Atromitos
19	Dimitris Diamantopoulos	(Greece)	ST / RW	18 November 1988 (aged 29)	(Greece) Apollon Smyrnis
20	Paschalis Kassos	(Greece)	RW / LW	7 November 1991 (aged 26)	(Greece) Apollon Smyrnis
21	Giannis Pasas	(Greece)	LW / RW / AM	7 October 1990 (aged 27)	(Greece) Iraklis
33	Aristidis Lottas	(Greece)	LW / RW / AM	16 September 1988 (aged 29)	(Greece) Sparti
99	Jone Pinto	(Brazil)	ST	13 November 1991 (aged 26)	Free agent

== Transfers and loans ==
=== Transfers in ===
Entry date	Position	No.	Player	From club	Fee	Ref.
July 2017	DF	15	(Greece) Giorgos Valerianos	(Greece) Apollon Smyrnis	Free	
July 2017	FW	19	(Greece) Dimitris Diamantopoulos	(Greece) Apollon Smyrnis	Free	
July 2017	MF	6	(Greece) Hussein Mumin	(Greece) Trikala	Free	
July 2017	MF	83	(Bosnia and Herzegovina) / (Serbia) Branislav Nikic	(Greece) AOK Kerkyra	Free	
July 2017	MF	8	(Greece) Lefteris Intzoglou	(Greece) Iraklis	Free	
July 2017	DF	4	(Greece) Stelios Marangos	(Greece) Platanias	Free	
July 2017	GK	22	(Greece) Georgios Kantimiris	(Greece) Veria	Free	
July 2017	DF	5	(Greece) Georgios Delizisis	(Greece) Apollon Smyrnis	Free	
July 2017	FW	33	(Greece) Aristidis Lottas	(Greece) Sparta	Free	
July 2017	MF	55	(Serbia) Ljubomir Stevanović	(Greece) Trikala	Free	
July 2017	FW	21	(Greece) Giannis Pasas	(Greece) Iraklis	Free	
July 2017	FW	20	(Greece) Paschalis Kassos	(Greece) Apollon Smyrnis	Free	
July 2017	FW	99	(Brazil) Jone Pinto	Free agent	Free	
September 2017	FW	17	(Greece) Vangelis Platellas	(Greece) Atromitos	Free	
January 2018	FW	89	(Jordan) / (Greece) Angelos Chanti	(Greece) OFI	Free	
January 2018	DF	66	(Greece) Petros Kanakoudis	(Finland) Inter Turku	Free	
January 2018	FW	9	(Greece) Michalis Bastakos	(Greece) Atromitos	Free	

=== Transfers out ===
Exit date	Position	No.	Player	To club	Fee	Ref.
July 2017	MF	77	(Republic of the Congo) / (France) Gaius Makouta	(Portugal) Sporting da Covilhã	Released	
July 2017	MF	26	(Argentina) Pitu Garcia	(Greece) Volos	Released	
July 2017	FW	14	(Algeria) / (France) Rafik Djebbour	Free agent	Released	
July 2017	MF	10	(Greece) Andreas Tatos	(Turkey) Elazığspor	85.000 €	
July 2017	FW	19	(Serbia) Brana Ilić	(Hungary) Kisvárda FC	Released	
August 2017	GK	13	(Greece) Sokratis Dioudis	(Greece) Panathinaikos	150.000 €	
August 2017	MF	4	(Greece) Vasilios Rovas	(Greece) Asteras Amaliadas	Released	
August 2017	DF	39	(Greece) Christos Intzidis	(Greece) Panegialios	Released	
September 2017	FW	17	(Greece) Stefanos Dogos	(Greece) Aiginiakos	Released	
January 2018	MF	55	(Serbia) Ljubomir Stevanović	(Greece) Doxa Drama	Released	
January 2018	FW	9	(Greece) Antonis Kapnidis	(Greece) Doxa Drama	Released	

=== Transfer summary ===
Spending

Summer: 0 €

Winter: 0 €

Total: 0 €

Income

Summer: ▲235.000 €

Winter: 0 €

Total: ▲235.000 €

Net Expenditure

Summer: ▲235.000 €

Winter: 0 €

Total: ▲235.000 €

== Competitions ==
=== Overall ===
Competition	Started round	Current position / round	Final position / round	First match	Last match
Football League	Matchday 1	—	2nd	28 October 2017	27 May 2018
Greek Cup	Group stage	—	Group stage	21 September 2017	28 November 2017

Updated to match played 27 May 2018
Source: Competitions

=== Overview ===
Competition	Record							
Competition	G	W	D	L	GF	GA	GD	Win %
Football League	34	26	7	1	65	13	+52	76.47
Greek Cup	3	1	1	1	3	3	+0	33.33
Total	37	27	8	2	68	13	+55	72.97

Updated to match played 27 May 2018
Source: Competitions

=== Football League ===
==== League table ====
Pos	Team	Pld	W	D	L	GF	GA	GD	Pts	Promotion or relegation
1	OFI (C, P)	34	27	5	2	86	14	+72	86	Promotion to Super League
2	Aris (P)	34	26	7	1	65	13	+52	85	Promotion to Super League
3	Panachaiki	34	22	7	5	50	21	+29	73	
4	AO Chania − Kissamikos	34	19	7	8	64	32	+32	64	
5	Doxa Drama	34	18	9	7	57	25	+32	63	

Source: Soccerway and Football League News
Rules for classification: 1) Points; 2) Head-to-head points; 3) Head-to-head goal difference; 4) Goals scored; 5) Goals against; 6) Play-offs (neutral ground, only used if needed to decide teams for promotion or relegation).
(C) Champions; (P) Promoted

==== Results summary ====
Overall								Home						Away					
Pld	W	D	L	GF	GA	GD	Pts	W	D	L	GF	GA	GD	W	D	L	GF	GA	GD
34	26	7	1	65	13	+52	85	14	3	0	36	3	+33	12	4	1	29	10	+19

Last updated: 27 May 2018.
Source: Soccerway

==== Results by matchday ====
Matchday	1	2	3	4	5	6	7	8	9	10	11	12	13	14	15	16	17	18	19	20	21	22	23	24	25	26	27	28	29	30	31	32	33	34
Ground	H	A	H	A	H	H	A	H	A	H	A	H	A	A	H	A	H	A	H	A	H	A	A	H	A	H	A	H	A	H	H	A	H	A
Result	W	W	W	W	W	W	W	D	D	W	W	D	W	W	W	W	W	W	D	D	W	D	W	W	L	W	D	W	W	W	W	W	W	W
Position	1	1	1	1	1	1	1	1	1	1	1	1	1	1	1	1	1	1	1	1	1	2	2	2	2	2	2	2	2	2	2	2	2	2

Updated to match(es) played on 27 May 2018. Source: Soccerway
A = Away; H = Home; W = Win; D = Draw; L = Loss; P = Postponed

==== Matches ====
28 October 2017 1	Aris Thessaloniki	5 – 0	Aiginiakos	Thessaloniki
15:00	Vangelis Platellas 19'; Giannis Pasas 24'; Paschalis Kassos 31'; Antonis Kapnidis 74'; Kenan Bargan 90+3'	Report		Stadium: Kleanthis Vikelidis Stadium; Referee: Ananias Fotiadis

5 November 2017 2	Trikala	0 – 1	Aris Thessaloniki	Trikala
15:00		Report	Charalampos Pavlidis 90'	Stadium: Trikala Municipal Stadium; Referee: Vasilis Fotias

12 November 2017 3	Aris Thessaloniki	2 – 0	Kallithea	Thessaloniki
15:00	Dimitris Diamantopoulos 41', 77'	Report		Stadium: Kleanthis Vikelidis Stadium; Referee: Dimitris Karatergios

19 November 2017 4	Ergotelis	2 – 3	Aris Thessaloniki	Heraklion
15:00	Hugo Cuypers 14'; Nikolaos Stamatakos 23'	Report	Markos Dounis 53'; Dimitris Diamantopoulos 72'; Vangelis Platellas 88'	Stadium: Pankritio Stadium; Referee: Giorgos Labrou

25 November 2017 5	Aris Thessaloniki	2 – 1	Panachaiki	Thessaloniki
15:00	Vangelis Platellas 45+1'; Giorgos Delizisis 76'	Report	Panagiotis Moraitis 7'	Stadium: Kleanthis Vikelidis Stadium; Referee: Giorgos Foukakis

3 December 2017 6	Aris Thessaloniki	1 – 0	AO Chania – Kissamikos	Thessaloniki
15:00	Kenan Bargan 45'	Report		Stadium: Kleanthis Vikelidis Stadium; Referee: Konstantinos Panitsidis

10 December 2017 7	Doxa Drama	1 – 2	Aris Thessaloniki	Drama
15:00	Konstantinos Markopoulos 28'	Report	Dimitris Diamantopoulos 64'; Charalampos Pavlidis 77'	Stadium: Doxa Drama Stadium; Referee: Evangelos Gratsanis

17 December 2017 8	Aris Thessaloniki	0 – 0	OFI	Thessaloniki
17:00		Report		Stadium: Kleanthis Vikelidis Stadium; Referee: Fotios Fotiadis

20 December 2017 9	Panegialios	0 – 0	Aris Thessaloniki	Aigio
15:00		Report		Stadium: Aigio National Stadium; Referee: Nikos Poulimas

7 January 2018 10	Aris Thessaloniki	2 – 0	Apollon Pontus	Thessaloniki
15:00	Vangelis Platellas 14'; Markos Dounis 45'	Report		Stadium: Kleanthis Vikelidis Stadium; Referee: Emmanouil Kiritsis

14 January 2018 11	Apollon Larissa	0 – 2	Aris Thessaloniki	Larissa
15:00		Report	Markos Dounis 39'; Dimitris Diamantopoulos 90'	Stadium: Alcazar Stadium; Referee: Konstantinos Antoniou

20 January 2018 12	Aris Thessaloniki	0 – 0	Karaiskakis	Thessaloniki
15:00		Report		Stadium: Kleanthis Vikelidis Stadium; Referee: Giorgos Kounalakis

27 January 2018 13	Acharnaikos	0 – 3 w/o	Aris Thessaloniki
		Report

31 January 2018 14	Veria	0 – 1	Aris Thessaloniki	Veria
17:00		Report	Giannis Pasas 89'	Stadium: Veria Stadium; Referee: Evangelos Kiotzenis

4 February 2018 15	Aris Thessaloniki	1 – 0	Sparti	Thessaloniki
15:00	Giorgos Delizisis 73'	Report		Stadium: Kleanthis Vikelidis Stadium; Referee: Apostolos Tzoumalakis

10 February 2018 16	Panserraikos	1 – 3	Aris Thessaloniki	Serres
15:00	Stergios Tsimikas 77'	Report	Hugo Sousa 58'; Dimitris Diamantopoulos 89'; Manolis Tzanakakis 90+4'	Stadium: Serres Municipal Stadium; Referee: Giorgos Foukakis

18 February 2018 17	Aris Thessaloniki	3 – 0	Anagennisi Karditsa	Thessaloniki
15:00	Hugo Sousa 46'; Vangelis Platellas 63' (pen.); Luka Milunović 90+2'	Report		Stadium: Kleanthis Vikelidis Stadium; Referee: Panagiotis Koukoulas

25 February 2018 18	Aiginiakos	1 – 4	Aris Thessaloniki	Aiginio
15:00	Nikos Zourkos 84'	Report	Dimitris Diamantopoulos 5' (pen.), 70'; Vangelis Platellas 13'; Charalampos Pavlidis 64'	Stadium: Municipal Stadium of Aiginio; Referee: Konstantinos Balatsoukas

4 March 2018 19	Aris Thessaloniki	0 – 0	Trikala	Thessaloniki
17:00		Report		Stadium: Kleanthis Vikelidis Stadium; Referee: Giorgos Tassis

7 March 2018 20	Kallithea	0 – 0	Aris Thessaloniki	Athens
15:00		Report		Stadium: Grigoris Lambrakis Stadium; Referee: Ioannis Blounas

12 March 2018 21	Aris Thessaloniki	3 – 0	Ergotelis	Thessaloniki
15:00	Vangelis Platellas 54' (pen.); Paschalis Kassos 76'; Angelos Chanti 90+5'	Report		Stadium: Kleanthis Vikelidis Stadium; Referee: Dimitris Roussis

18 March 2018 22	Panachaiki	1 – 1	Aris Thessaloniki	Patras
15:00	Christos Eleftheriadis 43'	Report	Markos Dounis 88'	Stadium: Kostas Davourlis Stadium; Referee: Giorgos Labrou

24 March 2018 23	AO Chania – Kissamikos	2 – 3	Aris Thessaloniki	Chania
15:00	Jean-Baptiste Léo 17', 62'	Report	Dimitris Diamantopoulos 25', 43'; Giannis Pasas 85'	Stadium: Perivolia Municipal Stadium; Referee: Angelos Zaravinos

1 April 2018 24	Aris Thessaloniki	1 – 0	Doxa Drama	Thessaloniki
17:00	Giorgos Delizisis 5'	Report		Stadium: Kleanthis Vikelidis Stadium; Referee: Giorgos Vreskas

4 April 2018 25	OFI	2 – 0	Aris Thessaloniki	Heraklion
15:00	Dimitrios Manos 45'; Dijilly Vouho 48'	Report		Stadium: Theodoros Vardinogiannis Stadium; Referee: Nikolaos Ratsiatos

15 April 2018 26	Aris Thessaloniki	5 – 2	Panegialios	Thessaloniki
17:00	Vangelis Platellas 25'; Dimitris Diamantopoulos 50', 67'; Kenan Bargan 56'; Petros Kanakoudis 89'	Report	Andreas Stamatis 44'; Aristidis Kokkoris 59'	Stadium: Kleanthis Vikelidis Stadium; Referee: Konstantinos Sidiropoulos

22 April 2018 27	Apollon Pontus	0 – 0	Aris Thessaloniki	Thessaloniki
17:00		Report		Stadium: Kalamaria Stadium; Referee: Aggelos Aggelakis

25 April 2018 28	Aris Thessaloniki	3 – 0	Apollon Larissa	Thessaloniki
17:00	Dimitris Diamantopoulos 22', 72'; Vangelis Platellas 52'	Report		Stadium: Kleanthis Vikelidis Stadium; Referee: Nikolaos Theodoropoulos

29 April 2018 29	Karaiskakis	0 – 2	Aris Thessaloniki	Arta
17:00		Report	Paschalis Kassos 13'; Hugo Sousa 42'	Stadium: Municipal Agioi Anargiroi Stadium; Referee: Evangelos Manouhos

6 May 2018 30	Aris Thessaloniki	3 – 0 w/o	Acharnaikos
		Report

13 May 2018 31	Aris Thessaloniki	3 – 0 w/o	Veria
		Report

16 May 2018 32	Sparti	0 – 3	Aris Thessaloniki	Sparta
17:00		Report	Dimitris Diamantopoulos 45+2' (pen.), 76'; Giannis Pasas 63'	Stadium: Sparta Municipal Stadium; Referee: Giorgos Markantonatos

20 May 2018 33	Aris Thessaloniki	2 – 0	Panserraikos	Thessaloniki
17:00	Giannis Pasas 57'; Charalampos Pavlidis 81'	Report		Stadium: Kleanthis Vikelidis Stadium; Referee: Giorgos Tassis

27 May 2018 34	Anagennisi Karditsa	0 – 1	Aris Thessaloniki	Karditsa
17:00		Report	Aristidis Lottas 90+2' (pen.)	Stadium: Municipal Stadium of Karditsa; Referee: Konstantinos Antoniou

=== Greek Cup ===
Aris Thessaloniki entered the competition in the Group Stage, as a club from Football League.

==== Group stage ====
Pos	Team	Pld	W	D	L	GF	GA	GD	Pts	
1	PAS Giannina	3	1	2	0	5	2	+3	5	Qualification for the Round of 16
2	Panionios	3	1	1	1	3	3	0	4	Qualification for the Round of 16
3	Aris Thessaloniki	3	1	1	1	3	3	0	4	
4	Panegialios	3	1	0	2	1	4	−3	3	

Updated to match(es) played on unknown. Source: Soccerway
Rules for classification: 1) Points; 2) Head-to-head points; 3) Goal difference; 4) Goals scored

===== Matches =====
21 September 2017 1	Panegialios	0 – 1	Aris Thessaloniki	Aigio
20:30		Report	Vangelis Platellas 68'	Stadium: Aigio National Stadium; Referee: Angelos Adamopoulos

25 October 2017 2	Aris Thessaloniki	1 – 2	Panionios	Thessaloniki
21:30	Giannis Pasas 74'	Report	Lazaros Lamprou 39'; Samed Yeşil 90+3'	Stadium: Kleanthis Vikelidis Stadium; Referee: Dimitrios Karantonis

28 November 2017 3	Aris Thessaloniki	1 – 1	PAS Giannina	Thessaloniki
19:30	Luka Milunović 60'	Report	Karim Soltani 72'	Stadium: Kleanthis Vikelidis Stadium; Referee: Alexandros Aretopoulos

== Squad statistics ==
=== Appearances ===
#	Position	Nat.	Player	Football League		Greek Cup		Total	
#	Position	Nat.	Player	Apps	Starts	Apps	Starts	Apps	Starts
1	GK	(Greece)	Alexandros Anagnostopoulos	12	11	2	2	14	13
2	DF	(Brazil)	Darcy Dolce Neto	1	1	0	0	1	1
3	DF	(Portugal)	Hugo Sousa	28	28	3	3	31	31
4	DF	(Greece)	Stelios Marangos	10	4	1	1	11	5
5	DF	(Greece)	Giorgos Delizisis	29	29	2	2	31	31
6	MF	(Greece)	Hussein Mumin	28	26	2	2	30	28
7	FW	(Greece)	Markos Dounis	21	11	0	0	21	11
8	MF	(Greece)	Lefteris Intzoglou	27	26	2	2	29	28
9	FW	(Greece)	Michalis Bastakos	9	4	0	0	9	4
10	MF	(Greece)	Dimitris Anakoglou	0	0	0	0	0	0
11	FW	(Greece)	Kenan Bargan	20	10	2	1	22	11
13	GK	(Greece)	Giannis Mantzaris	0	0	0	0	0	0
14	MF	(Greece)	Charalampos Pavlidis	21	12	3	2	24	14
15	DF	(Greece)	Giorgos Valerianos	25	24	2	2	27	26
16	FW	(Serbia)	Luka Milunović	9	1	2	1	11	2
17	FW	(Greece)	Vangelis Platellas	27	26	3	1	30	28
18	DF	(Greece)	Nikos Tsoumanis	2	1	1	1	3	2
19	FW	(Greece)	Dimitris Diamantopoulos	26	24	1	1	27	25
20	FW	(Greece)	Paschalis Kassos	19	14	3	3	22	17
21	FW	(Greece)	Giannis Pasas	26	17	2	2	28	19
22	GK	(Greece)	Giorgos Kantimiris	20	20	1	1	21	21
27	DF	(Greece)	Manolis Tzanakakis	21	20	1	1	22	21
28	DF	(Greece)	Christos Bourbos	19	14	3	2	22	16
33	FW	(Greece)	Aristidis Lottas	3	1	1	1	4	2
66	DF	(Greece)	Petros Kanakoudis	5	3	0	0	5	3
80	MF	(Greece)	Dimitris Klingopoulos	1	0	0	0	1	0
83	MF	(Bosnia and Herzegovina) / (Serbia)	Branislav Nikic	11	7	2	1	13	8
89	FW	(Jordan) / (Greece)	Angelos Chanti	9	5	0	0	9	5
99	FW	(Brazil)	Jone Pinto	0	0	0	0	0	0
Players who left the club during this season
	MF	(Serbia)	Ljubomir Stevanović	0	0	2	1	2	1
	FW	(Greece)	Antonis Kapnidis	5	1	1	0	6	1
Total				31		3		34	

Last updated: 27 May 2018
Source: Soccerway

=== Goals ===
Ranking	Position	Nat.	Player	Football League	Greek Cup	Total
1	FW	(Greece)	Dimitris Diamantopoulos	16	0	16
2	FW	(Greece)	Vangelis Platellas	9	1	10
3	FW	(Greece)	Giannis Pasas	5	1	6
4	FW	(Greece)	Markos Dounis	4	0	4
4	MF	(Greece)	Charalampos Pavlidis	4	0	4
6	DF	(Greece)	Georgios Delizisis	3	0	3
6	DF	(Portugal)	Hugo Sousa	3	0	3
6	FW	(Greece)	Paschalis Kassos	3	0	3
6	FW	(Greece)	Kenan Bargan	3	0	3
10	FW	(Serbia)	Luka Milunović	1	1	2
11	DF	(Greece)	Manolis Tzanakakis	1	0	1
11	FW	(Jordan) / (Greece)	Angelos Chanti	1	0	1
11	FW	(Greece)	Antonis Kapnidis (Note: Players who left the club during this season)	1	0	1
11	DF	(Greece)	Petros Kanakoudis	1	0	1
11	MF	(Greece)	Aristidis Lottas	1	0	1
Own Goals				0	0	0
Awarded by League				9	0	9
Total				65	3	68

Last updated: 27 May 2018
Source: Soccerway

=== Clean sheets ===
#	Nat.	Player	Football League	Greek Cup	Total
22	(Greece)	Giorgos Kantimiris	16	0	16
1	(Greece)	Alexandros Anagnostopoulos	8	1	9
Total			24	1	25

Last updated: 27 May 2018
Source: Soccerway
