= Siopis =

Siopis is a surname. Notable people with the surname include:

- Dimitris Siopis (born 1995), Greek footballer, brother of Manolis
- Manolis Siopis (born 1994), Greek footballer
- Penny Siopis (born 1953), South African artist
