= Nicolas Diguiny =

French professional footballer (born 1988)

Personal information
- Full name: Nicolas Diguiny
- Date of birth: 31 May 1988 (age 38)
- Place of birth: Saint-Germain-en-Laye, France
- Height: 1.79 m (5 ft 10 in)
- Position: Forward

Team information
- Current team: Kalamata
- Number: 10

Senior career*
Years	Team	Apps	(Gls)
2006–2013	Vannes	133	(20)
2013–2014	Le Poiré-sur-Vie	27	(5)
2014–2016	Panthrakikos	55	(8)
2016–2018	Atromitos	38	(14)
2018–2020	Aris	51	(13)
2020–2023	Apollon Limassol	75	(23)
2023–2024	AEZ Zakakiou	30	(6)
2024–	Kalamata	24	(6)
- * Club domestic league appearances and goals as of 18 January 2026

Nicolas Diguiny (born 31 May 1988) is a French professional footballer who plays as a forward or a winger for Greek Super League 2 club Kalamata.

== Club career ==
=== France ===
Born in Saint-Germain-en-Laye and raised in Achères, Diguiny arrived at Vannes OC in 2005, and played for the club for 8 consecutive seasons, from the youth team through the first team. In January 2013, his name was mentioned by stopping a penalty from Metz striker Yeni Ngbakoto in the second half, helping his club to escape with a 1–1 away draw. Two weeks later, he scored four times in a 5–0 win against US Quevilly in the CFA. He also scored for Vannes in the league in a 1–0 win against Poiré-sur-Vie.

=== Greece ===
==== Panthrakikos ====
In the summer of 2014, Diguiny signed for Panthrakikos of the Super League Greece. He played with former French players like El Fardou Ben Nabouhane, a former Vannes player and top scorer in the Super League, and ex-Monaco and Argentine international Javier Saviola.

==== Atromitos ====
On 9 June 2016, Atromitos announced Diguiny's signing for the next two years. On 30 April 2017, in the last matchday of the 2016–17 season, he scored a brace in a 4–1 home win against Platanias.

On 22 April 2018, in his 100th appearance in Greece, Diguiny scored three goals in a 4–1 home win game against Platanias, which secured Atromitos the fourth place in the league. He finished the 2017–18 season with 10 goals and 7 assists in the domestic competitions.

==== Aris ====
On 26 June 2018, Diguiny, having been released by Atromitos, signed a two-season contract with newly promoted Aris. On his debut, a 3–0 away win against Lamia, he scored with a header, receiving the MVP award as well. On 2 September 2018, he sealed a 2–0 home win against AEL. On 15 December 2018, he scored in a 2–1 home loss against Panetolikos. On 20 December 2018, he scored a brace in a 3–2 away loss against Ergotelis, which eliminated his team from the Greek Cup round of 16.

On 11 February 2019, Diguiny scored in a 3–0 away win against Asteras Tripolis. On 18 March 2019, he scored a brace against Apollon Smyrnis, helping to a 5–0 home win. On 5 May 2019, in the last matchday of the season, he scored a brace, helping to a remarkable 7–2 home win against Xanthi.

On 1 August 2019, Diguiny's penalty gave Aris a 1–0 away win and a qualification to the Europa League third qualifying round over AEL Limassol. Two weeks later, his goal sent the home game against Molde to extra time, where his team was eventually eliminated from the play-off round.

On 15 September 2019, he scored with a simple tap-in in an astonishing 4–0 home win against Panathinaikos. On 6 October 2019, he scored with a beautiful header to open the score in an eventual 2–1 home defeat against Olympiacos. On 10 November 2019, he scored with a kick in a 2–1 home win game against Asteras Tripolis.

On 19 January 2020, he scored in a disappointing 4–2 away loss against Olympiacos. On 1 March 2020, he scored in a 2–1 home loss against Atromitos.

On 24 June 2020, he scored in a 2–2 home draw for the Greek Cup semi finals, which resulted in his team being eliminated.

=== Apollon Limassol ===
On 3 July 2020, he signed a two years' contract with Cypriot First Division club Apollon Limassol for an undisclosed fee.

== Personal life ==
Born in France, Diguiny is of Ivorian descent.

== Career statistics ==
As of 2 April 2026

Appearances and goals by club, season and competition
Club	Season	League			National Cup		Continental		Other		Total	
Club	Season	Division	Apps	Goals	Apps	Goals	Apps	Goals	Apps	Goals	Apps	Goals
Panthrakikos	2014–15	Super League Greece	30	4	2	0	—		—		32	4
Panthrakikos	2015–16	Super League Greece	25	4	0	0	—		—		25	4
Panthrakikos	Total		55	8	2	0	—		—		57	8
Atromitos	2016–17	Super League Greece	10	4	1	0	—		—		11	4
Atromitos	2017–18	Super League Greece	28	10	6	0	—		—		34	10
Atromitos	Total		38	14	7	0	—		—		45	14
Aris	2018–19	Super League Greece	27	8	3	2	—		—		30	10
Aris	2019–20	Super League Greece	24	5	4	1	4	2	—		32	8
Aris	Total		51	13	7	3	4	2	—		62	18
Apollon Limassol	2020–21	Cypriot First Division	32	17	1	0	3	1	—		36	18
Apollon Limassol	2021–22	Cypriot First Division	12	4	2	1	—		—		14	5
Apollon Limassol	2022–23	Cypriot First Division	27	2	1	0	8	0	—		36	2
Apollon Limassol	2023–24	Cypriot First Division	3	0	—		—		—		3	0
Apollon Limassol	Total		74	23	4	1	11	1	—		89	25
AEZ Zakakiou	2023–24	Cypriot First Division	34	6	2	2	—		—		36	8
Kalamata	2024–25	Superleague Greece 2	20	6	2	0	—		—		22	6
Kalamata	2025–26	Superleague Greece 2	4	0	0	0	—		—		4	0
Kalamata	Total		24	6	2	0	—		—		26	6
Career total			276	70	24	5	15	3	0	0	315	79

== Honours ==
Vannes

- Coupe de la Ligue: runner-up 2008–09
