= Martín Tonso =

Argentine footballer (born 1989)

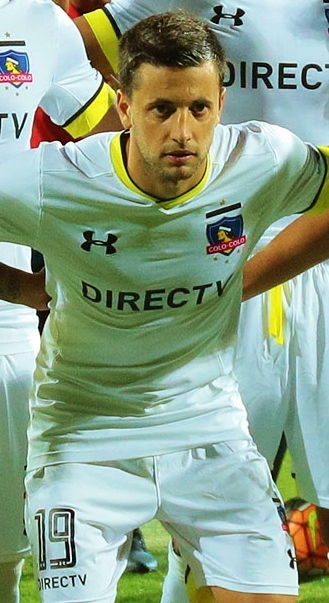
- Tonso with Colo-Colo

Personal information
- Date of birth: 19 October 1989 (age 37)
- Place of birth: Gödeken, Argentina
- Height: 1.75 m (5 ft 9 in)
- Positions: Winger; attacking midfielder

Youth career
- Newell's Old Boys

Senior career*
Years	Team	Apps	(Gls)
2011–2015	Newell's Old Boys	116	(7)
2015–2016	Colo-Colo	11	(4)
2016–2017	Atromitos	27	(6)
2017–2019	Asteras Tripolis	36	(8)
2019–2020	Aris	17	(1)
2020–2021	Deportes La Serena	8	(1)
2021–2022	Vis Pesaro	21	(5)
2023	Gravina	8	(0)
- * Club domestic league appearances and goals as of 17:05, 13 November 2023 (UTC)

Martín Tonso (born 19 October 1989) is an Argentine professional footballer who plays as an attacking midfielder.

== Career ==
Born in Gödeken, Argentina, Tonso joined Newell's Old Boys youth ranks. Promoted to first-adult team, he debuted in February 2011 against Lanús. However Tonso broke into first-team as right winger with Gerardo Martino as coach, where gained notoriety helping the club to win the 2013 Torneo Final.

=== Colo-Colo ===
On 21 January 2016, he joined Chilean giants Colo-Colo, being presented the same day alongside his compatriot Matías Zaldivia. In his debut he scored a goal against Peru's Universitario in a 3–3 exhibition match draw at Lima. His competitive debut came on 7 February during a goalless with Deportes Iquique and his first league goal was on 21 February against Unión La Calera, being the only one of the game. On 6 March, he scored his third league goal during the 170th derby between Colo-Colo and Universidad Católica.

=== Greece ===
On 2 September 2016, Atromitos officially announced the signing of Argentine attacking midfielder Martin Tonso, who signed a 1+1 season contract with the Greek Super League club for an undisclosed fee. On 30 June 2017, the club announced that they wouldn't exercise their right to renew Tonso's contract.

On 11 September 2017, he joined Asteras Tripolis. On 2 December 2018 he scored his first goal in a comfortable 4–0 home win against Kerkyra. On 4 March 2018, he scored in a dramatic 3–2 home win against PAOK. On 2 April he scored a brace in a 4–0 home win game against Platanias, helping his club in its effort to win a ticket to the next year's UEFA Europa League.

Despite leaving the club at the end of the season, on 3 September 2018 he returned and signed a new one-year contract. On 16 September 2018, he scored in an eventual 2–1 away loss against Olympiacos. On 2 December 2018, he opened the score in a 2–0 away win against Levadiakos. On 15 December 2018, Tonso was the MVP of a 2–1 home win against OFI, as he scored a brace and prolonged the team's winning streak to four straight games.

On 12 January 2019, he signed a contract with Aris, for an undisclosed fee. His first goal for the club came in an emphatic 5–0 home win against Apollon Smyrnis, on 18 March 2019.

== Career statistics ==
As of match played 9 April 2022

Appearances and goals by club, season and competition
Club	Season	League			National cup		Continental		Other		Total	
Club	Season	Division	Apps	Goals	Apps	Goals	Apps	Goals	Apps	Goals	Apps	Goals
Newell's Old Boys	2010–11	Primera División	12	0	—		—		—		12	0
Newell's Old Boys	2011–12	Primera División	23	3	—		—		—		23	3
Newell's Old Boys	2012–13	Primera División	33	3	1	0	10 (Note: Appearance(s) in Copa Libertadores)	1	—		44	4
Newell's Old Boys	2013–14	Primera División	23	0	1	0	—		—		24	0
Newell's Old Boys	2014	Primera División	7	0	—		1	0	—		8	0
Newell's Old Boys	2015	Primera División	18	1	—		—		1 (Note: Appearance(s) in Liguilla Pre Sudamericana)	0	19	1
Newell's Old Boys	Total		116	7	2	0	11	1	1	0	130	8
Colo-Colo	2015–16	Chilean Primera División	11	4	0	0	6	0	—		17	4
Atromitos	2016–17	Super League Greece	27	6	7	2	—		—		34	8
Asteras Tripolis	2017–18	Super League Greece	24	4	3	0	—		—		27	4
Asteras Tripolis	2018–19	Super League Greece	12	4	1	0	—		—		13	4
Asteras Tripolis	Total		36	8	4	0	0	0	0	0	40	8
Aris	2018–19	Super League Greece	5	1	0	0	—		—		5	1
Aris	2019–20	Super League Greece	12	0	1	0	4 (Note: Appearance(s) in UEFA Europa League)	0	4 (Note: Appearance(s) in SL1 Playoffs)	0	21	0
Aris	Total		17	1	1	0	4	0	4	0	26	1
Deportes La Serena	2020	Chilean Primera División	8	1	0	0	—		—		8	1
Deportes La Serena	2021	Chilean Primera División	0	0	0	0	—		—		0	0
Deportes La Serena	Total		8	1	0	0	0	0	0	0	8	1
Vis Pesaro	2021–22	Serie C	20	5	—		—		0	0	20	5
Career total			240	32	14	3	22	1	5	0	275	35

== Honours ==
Newell's Old Boys

- Primera División: 2013 Final
