= Manolis Siopis =

Greek footballer (born 1994)

Personal information
- Full name: Emmanouil Siopis
- Date of birth: 14 May 1994 (age 32)
- Place of birth: Tychero, Greece
- Height: 1.68 m (5 ft 6 in)
- Position: Defensive midfielder

Team information
- Current team: Fatih Karagümrük
- Number: 20

Youth career
- 2008–2013: Olympiacos

Senior career*
Years	Team	Apps	(Gls)
2013–2014	Olympiacos	0	(0)
2013–2014	→ Platanias (loan)	16	(0)
2014–2017	Panionios	89	(0)
2017–2018	Olympiacos	1	(0)
2017–2018	→ Panionios (loan)	17	(0)
2018–2019	Aris	25	(1)
2019–2021	Alanyaspor	63	(0)
2021–2023	Trabzonspor	63	(0)
2023–2025	Cardiff City	63	(0)
2025–2026	Panathinaikos	32	(0)
2026–	Fatih Karagümrük	8	(0)

International career^{‡}
2010–2011	Greece U17	7	(0)
2012	Greece U18	3	(0)
2012–2013	Greece U19	9	(0)
2013–2016	Greece U21	15	(0)
2019–	Greece	42	(1)
- * Club domestic league appearances and goals as of 3 October 2026 ‡ National team caps and goals as of 23 November 2025

Manolis Siopis (Greek: Μανώλης Σιώπης; born 14 May 1994) is a Greek professional footballer who plays as a defensive midfielder for TFF 1. Lig club Fatih Karagümrük and the Greece national team.

== Club career ==
=== Olympiacos ===
Born in Tychero, Siopis began playing football with the Greek side Olympiacos.

==== Loan to Platanias ====
In 2013, he was loaned to Platanias and he made his debut in the Super League on 25 August 2014 against Ergotelis.

=== Panionios ===
On 1 August 2014 he joined the Greek club Panionios. On 1 June 2016, he voted from the fans as the MVP of the club for the 2015–16 season.

Prior to the 2016–17 season, the officials of Panathinaikos are monitoring the case of Panionios' defensive midfielder, whose current contract expires at summer of 2017. However, Olympiacos still hold the 30% of 23-year-old international's rights and this was the reason Panionios did not sell him to Italy last January, even if there were offers, because their profit would not had been big enough.

=== Return to Olympiacos ===
On 23 November 2016, the international defensive midfielder will return to his former club Olympiacos, where he started his professional career, in January 2017. The Reds will pay about €150,000 in order to purchase the 22-year-old former player of Platanias, whose current contract expires at summer of 2017 and is expected to remain at Panionios until the end of 2016–17 season.

==== Loan to Panionios ====
On 30 August 2017, Siopis returns to his former club, Panionios on loan from Olympiacos until the end of 2017–18 season. Olympiacos bought Siopis this summer but the player even he played three matches with Olympiacos, asked the club to let him return to Panionios.

=== Aris ===
On 27 August 2018, newly promoted Aris has taken out-of-favour midfielder Manolis Siopis as a free transfer from Olympiacos by signing a two-year contract for an undisclosed fee. Siopis was expected to be a key player for Olympiacos after a strong showing on loan with Panionios last season, but when engaging in a conflict with the club's administration, he was exiled from the team.

On 5 May 2019, in the last matchday of the season, Siopis scored his first ever career goal, successfully converting a penalty, in a remarkable 7–2 home win against Xanthi.

=== Alanyaspor ===
On 30 June 2019, Alanyaspor paid the release clause of €500,000 for the Greek international, who will play for the Turkish club for the next three years on a fee of €2.1 million.

=== Trabzonspor ===
At the summer of 2021, after two full seasons with his previous club, Siopis signed a 3-year contract with Trabzonspor. On 16 August 2023, the club announced it had terminated the player's contract.

=== Cardiff City ===
On 18 August 2023, Siopis joined Championship side Cardiff City on a 3-year contract.

=== Panathinaikos ===
On 31 January 2025, Siopis returned to Greece, joining Panathinaikos on a two-and-a-half year deal for an undisclosed fee.

=== Fatih Karagümrük S.K. ===
On 27 July 2026 Panathinaikos F.C. have announced they have allowed Siopis to join the Turkish club Fatih Karagümrük as a free transfer.

== International career ==
Siopis made his Greece national team debut on 30 May 2019, in a friendly against Turkey, as a starter.

== Personal life ==
Siopis' younger brother, Dimitrios, is also a professional footballer.

== Career statistics ==
As of 1 June 2026

Club	Season	League			National cup (Note: Includes Greek Cup, Turkish Cup, FA Cup)		Europe		Other		Total	
Club	Season	Division	Apps	Goals	Apps	Goals	Apps	Goals	Apps	Goals	Apps	Goals
Platanias (loan)	2013–14	Super League Greece	16	0	2	0	—		—		18	0
Panionios	2014–15	Super League Greece	21	0	5	0	—		—		26	0
Panionios	2015–16	Super League Greece	35	0	6	0	—		—		41	0
Panionios	2016–17	Super League Greece	33	0	1	0	—		—		34	0
Panionios (loan)	2017–18	Super League Greece	17	0	3	0	—		—		20	0
Panionios (loan)	Total		106	0	15	0	—		—		121	0
Olympiacos	2017–18	Super League Greece	1	0	0	0	2 (Note: Appearances in UEFA Champions League)	0	—		3	0
Aris	2018–19	Super League Greece	25	1	2	0	—		—		27	1
Alanyaspor	2019–20	Süper Lig	27	0	7	0	–		—		34	0
Alanyaspor	2020–21	Süper Lig	35	0	3	0	–		—		38	0
Alanyaspor	2021–22	Süper Lig	1	0	0	0	–		—		1	0
Alanyaspor	Total		63	0	10	0	—		—		73	0
Trabzonspor	2021–22	Süper Lig	33	0	4	0	1 (Note: Appearance in UEFA Europa Conference League)	0	—		38	0
Trabzonspor	2022–23	Süper Lig	30	0	1	0	8 (Note: Two appearances in UEFA Champions League, four appearances in UEFA Europa League, two appearances in UEFA Europa Conference League)	0	1 (Note: Appearance in Turkish Super Cup)	0	40	0
Trabzonspor	Total		63	0	5	0	9	0	1	0	78	0
Cardiff City	2023–24	Championship	42	0	0	0	—		—		42	0
Cardiff City	2024–25	Championship	21	0	1	0	—		—		22	0
Cardiff City	Total		63	0	1	0	–		–		64	0
Panathinaikos	2024–25	Super League Greece	10	0	1	0	4 (Note: Appearances in UEFA Conference League)	0	—		15	0
Panathinaikos	2025–26	Super League Greece	22	0	3	0	12	0	—		37	0
Career total			369	1	39	0	27	0	1	0	436	1

== Honours ==
Trabzonspor

- Süper Lig: 2021–22
- Turkish Super Cup: 2022

Individual

- Super League Greece Team of the Season: 2015–16, 2016–17
