= Georgios Valerianos =

Greek footballer (born 1992)

Personal information
- Date of birth: 13 February 1992 (age 34)
- Place of birth: Athens, Greece
- Height: 1.80 m (5 ft 11 in)
- Position: Left-back

Team information
- Current team: Chania
- Number: 15

Senior career*
Years	Team	Apps	(Gls)
2010–2012	Olympiacos	1	(0)
2010–2011	→ Thrasyvoulos (loan)	17	(0)
2012	→ Glyfada (loan)	9	(1)
2012–2013	OFI	1	(0)
2013–2014	Kavala	17	(0)
2014–2015	Iraklis	13	(0)
2015–2016	Apollon Smyrnis	14	(0)
2016	Platanias	2	(0)
2016–2017	Apollon Smyrnis	26	(0)
2017–2019	Aris	43	(0)
2019–2021	Pafos	31	(0)
2019	→ Riga (loan)	2	(0)
2021–2023	Ionikos	59	(1)
2023–2025	Kalamata	50	(0)
2025	Tirana	15	(0)
2026–	Chania	8	(0)

International career^{‡}
2010–2011	Greece U19	8	(0)
2019	Greece	1	(0)
- * Club domestic league appearances and goals as of 21 April 2026 ‡ National team caps and goals as of 30 May 2019

Georgios Valerianos (Greek: Γεώργιος Βαλεριάνος; born 13 February 1992) is a Greek professional footballer who plays as a left-back for Super League 2 club Chania.

== Club career ==
Valerianos began playing football with Olympiacos. He made 44 appearances for the youth team with four goals. Valerianos was first included in Olympiacos' first team in a league match against Panthrakikos on 11 April 2010, where he appeared as a second-half substitute. On 22 July 2014 he signed for Iraklis in the Greek Football League. Valerianos debuted for Iraklis in a cup match against Lamia. On 12 August 2015, he signed a contract with second-tier club Apollon Smyrnis. On 29 January 2016, he solved his contract with the club.

On 1 July 2019, after two years with Aris, Valerianos signed a three years' contract with Cypriot club Pafos for an undisclosed fee. On 4 July 2019, the international back will have an intermediary station in his career after being loaned to Riga, a Latvian football club, which owns the same property status as Pafos. According to sources the borrowing will take just a month for the international left back in order to help the club for the 2019–20 UEFA Europa League qualifying phase and play-off round.

On 25 June 2021, Valerianos returned to Greece, signing a two-year contract with Ionikos.

== International career ==
On 19 March 2019, Greece head coach Angelos Anastasiadis announced the first call up of Valerianos for the match against Liechtenstein and Bosnia and Herzegovina for UEFA Euro 2020. He made his debut on 30 May 2019, in a friendly against Turkey, as a starter.

== Career statistics ==
=== Club ===
As of 30 January 2022

Club	Season	League			Cup		Continental		Other		Total	
Club	Season	Division	Apps	Goals	Apps	Goals	Apps	Goals	Apps	Goals	Apps	Goals
Olympiacos	2009–10	Super League Greece	1	0	0	0	—		—		1	0
Olympiacos	2011–12	Super League Greece	0	0	1	0	—		—		1	0
Olympiacos	Total		1	0	1	0	—		—		2	0
Thrasyvoulos (loan)	2010–11	Supeleague Greece 2	17	0	1	0	—		—		18	0
Thrasyvoulos (loan)	Total		17	0	1	0	—		—		18	0
Glyfada (loan)	2011–12	Football League 2 (Greece)	9	1	0	0	—		—		9	1
Glyfada (loan)	Total		9	1	0	0	—		—		9	1
OFI	2012–13	Super League Greece	1	0	0	0	—		—		1	0
OFI	Total		1	0	0	0	—		—		1	0
Kavala	2013–14	Super League Greece 2	17	0	1	0	—		—		18	0
Kavala	Total		17	0	1	0	—		—		18	0
Iraklis	2014–15	Supeleague Greece 2	13	0	5	0	—		—		18	0
Iraklis	Total		13	0	5	0	—		—		18	0
Apollon Smyrnis	2015–16	Supeleague Greece 2	14	0	2	1	—		—		16	1
Apollon Smyrnis	Total		14	0	2	1	—		—		16	1
Platanias	2015–16	Super League Greece 2	2	0	0	0	—		—		2	0
Platanias	Total		2	0	0	0	—		—		2	0
Apollon Smyrnis	2016–17	Supeleague Greece 2	26	0	3	0	—		—		29	0
Apollon Smyrnis	Total		26	0	3	0	—		—		29	0
Aris	2017–18	Supeleague Greece 2	25	0	2	0	—		—		27	0
Aris	2018–19	Super League Greece	18	0	0	0	—		—		18	0
Aris	Total		43	0	2	0	—		—		45	0
Riga	2019	Latvian Higher League	2	0	1	0	5	0	—		8	0
Riga	Total		2	0	1	0	5	0	—		8	0
Pafos	2019–20	Cypriot First Division	13	0	1	0	—		—		14	0
Pafos	2020–21	Cypriot First Division	18	0	1	0	—		—		19	0
Pafos	Total		31	0	2	0	—		—		33	0
Ionikos	2021–22	Super League Greece	19	0	3	0	—		—		22	0
Ionikos	Total		19	0	3	0	—		—		22	0
Career total			199	1	21	1	5	0	0	0	223	2

== Honours ==
Riga

- Latvian Higher League: 2019

Olympiacos

- Greek Cup: 2011–12
