= Alexandros Anagnostopoulos =

Greek footballer

Personal information
- Date of birth: 18 August 1994 (age 32)
- Place of birth: Athens, Greece
- Height: 1.86 m (6 ft 1 in)
- Position: Goalkeeper

Team information
- Current team: A.E. Kifisia
- Number: 15

Youth career
- 2005–2013: Panathinaikos

Senior career*
Years	Team	Apps	(Gls)
2013–2016	Panathinaikos	0	(0)
2016–2019	Aris	15	(0)
2019–2020	Apollon Smyrnis	10	(0)
2020–2022	Ionikos	20	(0)
2022–2024	A.E. Kifisia	69	(0)
2024–2025	Olympiacos	1	(0)
2025–2026	AEL	14	(0)
2026–	A.E. Kifisia	0	(0)
- * Club domestic league appearances and goals as of 14 June 2026

Alexandros Anagnostopoulos (Greek: Αλέξανδρος Αναγνωστόπουλος; born 18 August 1994) is a Greek professional footballer who plays as a goalkeeper for Super League club A.E. Kifisia.

== Career statistics ==
As of match played 14 June 2026

Appearances and goals by club, season and competition
Club	Season	League			Greek Cup		Continental		Other		Total	
Club	Season	Division	Apps	Goals	Apps	Goals	Apps	Goals	Apps	Goals	Apps	Goals
Panathinaikos	2013-14	Super League Greece	0	0	0	0	—		0	0	0	0
Panathinaikos	2014-15	Super League Greece	0	0	0	0	0	0	0	0	0	0
Panathinaikos	2015-16	Super League Greece	0	0	0	0	0	0	0	0	0	0
Panathinaikos	Total		0	0	0	0	0	0	0	0	0	0
Aris	2016-17	Football League Greece	1	0	2	0	—		—		3	0
Aris	2017-18	Football League Greece	12	0	2	0	—		—		14	0
Aris	2018-19	Super League Greece	1	0	1	0	—		—		2	0
Aris	Total		14	0	5	0	—		—		19	0
Apollon Smyrnis	2019-20	Super League Greece 2	8	0	0	0	—		2 (Note: Appearance(s) in Super League Greece 2 Promotion play-offs)	0	10	0
Ionikos	2020-21	Super League Greece 2	21	0	0	0	—		—		21	0
Ionikos	2021-22	Super League Greece	0	0	2	0	—		—		2	0
Ionikos	Total		21	0	2	0	—		—		23	0
A.E. Kifisia	2021-22	Super League Greece 2	22	0	0	0	—		—		22	0
A.E. Kifisia	2022-23	Super League Greece 2	23	0	2	0	—		—		25	0
A.E. Kifisia	2023-24	Super League Greece	23	0	1	0	—		—		24	0
A.E. Kifisia	Total		68	0	3	0	—		—		71	0
Olympiacos	2024-25	Super League Greece	1	0	0	0	0	0	—		0	0
AE Larissa	2025-26	Super League Greece	14	0	3	0	0	0	—		17	0
Career total			126	0	13	0	0	0	2	0	130	0

== Honours ==
Panathinaikos

- Greek Football Cup: 2013–14

Ionikos

- Super League Greece 2: 2020–21

Olympiacos

- Super League Greece: 2024–25
- Greek Football Cup: 2024–25
