= Dimitrios Siopis =

Greek footballer

Personal information
- Date of birth: 6 September 1995 (age 31)
- Place of birth: Tychero, Greece
- Height: 1.75 m (5 ft 9 in)
- Position: Right-back

Team information
- Current team: Doxa Tycherou

Youth career
- Olympiacos

Senior career*
Years	Team	Apps	(Gls)
2014–2015	Olympiacos	0	(0)
2014–2015	→ Fostiras (loan)	19	(0)
2015–2017	Sparta	34	(1)
2017–2018	OFI Crete	1	(0)
2018–2020	Doxa Drama	62	(0)
2020−2021	Zemplín Michalovce	11	(0)
2021–	Doxa Tycherou		
- * Club domestic league appearances and goals as of 20:14, 20 March 2021 (UTC).

Dimitrios Siopis (Greek: Δημήτριος Σιώπης; born 6 September 1995) is a Greek professional footballer who plays as a right-back for Doxa Tycherou.

== Personal life ==
Siopis is the younger brother in Panathinaikos and Greece midfielder Manolis.

== Honours ==
Sparta

- Gamma Ethniki: 2015–16

OFI

- Football League: 2017–18
