= Vangelis Platellas =

Greek footballer (born 1988)

Personal information
- Full name: Evangelos Platellas
- Date of birth: 1 December 1988 (age 37)
- Place of birth: Athens, Greece
- Height: 1.65 m (5 ft 5 in)
- Position: Winger

Team information
- Current team: Ionikos

Senior career*
Years	Team	Apps	(Gls)
2005–2011	Kallithea	62	(8)
2011–2013	Skoda Xanthi	19	(1)
2013–2016	AEK Athens	77	(26)
2016–2017	Atromitos	16	(1)
2017–2018	Aris	27	(9)
2018–2019	OFI	15	(2)
2019–2020	Neftçi Baku	25	(1)
2020–2021	AEL	13	(0)
2021	Ionikos	20	(4)
2021–2022	Xanthi	7	(2)
2022–2023	Ionikos	9	(0)
2023	Aiolikos	4	(0)
2023–2026	Nea Ionia		
2026	Ethnikos Piraeus		
2026–	Ionikos		
- * Club domestic league appearances and goals as of 12 October 2023

Vangelis Platellas (Greek: Βαγγέλης Πλατέλλας, born 1 December 1988) is a Greek professional footballer who plays as a winger for Gamma Ethniki club Ionikos.

== Club career ==
Vangelis Platellas began playing professional football for Football League side Kallithea, and then transferred on 2 January 2012 to Super league side Skoda Xanthi.

=== AEK Athens ===
In the summer of 2013, Platellas signed with AEK Athens. In the 2013–14 season, Platellas made 25 appearances scoring 15 goals. On 29 August 2014 he scored in a 4–0 home win against Fokikos for the Greek Cup. On 30 November 2014, he scored after three months in a 3–1 away win against Panachaiki. One week later, he scored in a 7–0 home win against Episkopi. On 17 December 2014, he scored a brace in a comfortable 4–0 win against Fostiras. On 24 February 2015, he opened the score in a 2–1 home win against Panachaiki. On 15 March 2015, he scored in a 3–1 away win against Fostiras. On 13 May 2015, he scored the only goal in a 1–0 away win against AEL. He finished the 2014–15 season with 9 goals and 8 assists in all competitions.

On 29 November 2015, he scored his first ever Super League goal in a 2–0 home win against Panetolikos, after an assist from Rafik Djebbour.

It seems that the 28-year-old international, who joined the Greek Cup winners back in 2013 and his current contract expires at the end of 2016–17 season, will leave the club in January window in order to continue his career elsewhere.

=== Atromitos ===
On 28 December 2016, Platellas signed a 1,5 years' contract with fellow Greek club Atromitos for an undisclosed fee. On 18 February 2017, he opened the score in a 2–1 home win against Xanthi. On 31 August 2017, he solved his contract with the club.

=== Aris ===
On 11 September 2017, Platellas signed a one-year contract with Football League club Aris for an undisclosed fee. On 21 September 2017, thanks to a close-range effort by the international winger, Aris won 1–0 Panegialios on the road for 2017–18 Greek Cup. It was his first goal with his new club. On 28 October 2017, he scored in the season's opener, a 5–0 home win against Aiginiakos. On 19 November 2017, he scored a 90th-minute winner in a dramatic 3–2 away win against Ergotelis, after a catastrophic first half, which found his team being down by two goals. On 25 November 2017, Platellas was the MVP of a 2–1 home win against Panachaiki, scoring the equalizer and providing the assist to Georgios Delizisis for the winning goal. On 7 January 2018, he opened the score in a 2–0 home win against Apollon Pontus. On 18 February 2018, he scored in a 3–0 home win against Anagennisi Karditsa. A week later, he scored the second of four in a comfortable 4–1 away win against Aiginiakos. On 12 March 2018, he opened the score, with a penalty kick, in a 3–0 home win against Ergotelis.

=== OFI ===
On 23 June 2018, Platellas signed a one-year contract with OFI. On 9 December 2018, he scored his first goal for the club in an important 3–1 home win against Panathinaikos, only the second of the season.

On 12 January 2019, he opened the score in a 1–1 home draw against Panionios. On 20 January 2019, OFI accepted an offer in the region of €50,000 from Neftçi for the Greek winger. The Azerbaijani club is currently sitting on top of the league table and is looking for some quality players in the battle for the title.

=== Neftçi Baku ===
On 22 January 2019, Neftçi Baku officially announced the signing of the Greek winger until the summer of 2020 for an undisclosed fee.

== International career ==
Platellas was called in to the Greece national football team by Kostas Tsanas for a UEFA Euro 2016 qualifier against Romania.

== Career statistics ==
=== Club ===
As of 13 May 2024

Club	Season	League			Cup^{1}		Europe		Total	
Club	Season	Division	Apps	Goals	Apps	Goals	Apps	Goals	Apps	Goals
Kallithea	2006–07	Super League Greece 2	2	0	0	0	—		2	0
Kallithea	2007–08	Super League Greece 2	7	0	0	0	—		7	0
Kallithea	2008–09	Super League Greece 2	22	0	1	0	—		23	0
Kallithea	2009–10	Gamma Ethniki	25	0	3	0	—		28	0
Kallithea	2010–11	Super League Greece 2	27	2	1	0	—		28	2
Kallithea	2011–12	Super League Greece 2	6	0	2	2	—		8	2
Kallithea	Total		89	2	7	2	0	0	96	4
Skoda Xanthi	2011–12	Super League Greece	4	0	0	0	—		4	0
Skoda Xanthi	2012–13	Super League Greece	19	0	3	0	—		22	0
Skoda Xanthi	Total		23	0	3	0	0	0	26	0
AEK Athens	2013–14	Gamma Ethniki	26	15	3	1	—		29	16
AEK Athens	2014–15	Super League Greece 2	26	8	9	1	—		35	9
AEK Athens	2015–16	Super League Greece	18	1	7	2	—		25	3
AEK Athens	2016–17	Super League Greece	5	2	1	0	2	0	8	2
AEK Athens	Total		75	26	20	4	2	0	97	30
Atromitos	2016–17	Super League Greece	16	1	3	0	—		19	1
Aris	2017–18	Super League Greece 2	27	9	3	1	—		30	10
OFI	2018–19	Super League Greece	15	2	2	0	—		17	2
Neftçi Baku	2018–19	Azerbaijan Premier League	13	0	0	0	—		13	0
Neftçi Baku	2019–20	Azerbaijan Premier League	12	1	1	0	5	2	18	3
Neftçi Baku	Total		25	1	1	0	5	2	31	3
AEL	2020–21	Super League Greece	13	0	0	0	—		13	0
Ionikos	2020–21	Super League Greece 2	20	4	0	0	—		20	4
Xanthi	2021–22	Super League Greece 2	8	2	3	1	—		11	3
Ionikos	2021–22	Super League Greece	9	0	0	0	—		9	0
Ionikos	2022–23	Super League Greece	0	0	0	0	—		0	0
Ionikos	Total		9	0	0	0	0	0	9	0
Eolikos	2022–23	Gamma Ethniki	10	2	0	0	—		10	2
Nea Ionia	2023–24	Athens FCA First Division	20	10	4	0	—		24	10
Career total			350	59	46	8	5	2	401	69

^{1} Includes two appearances in the semi-pro Football League 2 Cup and four appearances in the amateur Athens FCA Cup .

== Honours ==
Kallithea

- Gamma Ethniki: 2009–10

AEK Athens

- Football League: 2014–15 (South Group)
- Football League 2: 2013–14 (6th Group)
- Greek Cup: 2015–16

Ionikos

- Super League Greece 2: 2020–21

Aiolikos

- Gamma Ethniki: 2022–23

Nea Ionia

- Athens FCA First Division: 2023–24
- Athens FCA Cup: 2023–24

=== Individual ===
- Football League 2 Best Young Player of the Year: 2009–10
- Super League Greece 2 Player of the Year: 2020–21
