= Hugo Sousa =

Portuguese footballer

Personal information
- Full name: Hugo Filipe Gonçalves Martins de Sousa
- Date of birth: 4 June 1992 (age 34)
- Place of birth: Santa Marinha, Portugal
- Height: 1.84 m (6 ft 0 in)
- Position: Centre-back

Team information
- Current team: A.E. Kifisia
- Number: 33

Youth career
- 2001–2002: Imortal
- 2002–2004: Vilanovense
- 2004–2011: Porto

Senior career*
Years	Team	Apps	(Gls)
2011	Brașov	2	(0)
2012	AEL Limassol	1	(0)
2012–2013	AEP	12	(1)
2013–2014	Sporting CP B	22	(0)
2014–2016	Waasland-Beveren	24	(1)
2017–2020	Aris	67	(4)
2020–2021	Astra Giurgiu	21	(1)
2021–2022	Sepsi OSK	6	(0)
2022–2024	Ionikos	46	(1)
2024–	A.E. Kifisia	54	(1)

International career
2007–2008	Portugal U16	5	(0)
2011	Portugal U19	5	(0)
2012	Portugal U20	2	(0)
- * Club domestic league appearances and goals as of 19 September 2026

Hugo Filipe Gonçalves Martins de Sousa (born 4 June 1992) is a Portuguese professional footballer who plays as a central defender for Super League Greece club A.E. Kifisia.

== Club career ==
Born in Santa Marinha (Vila Nova de Gaia), Sousa joined FC Porto's youth system in 2004, aged 12. Seven years later, after having playing in several sides at the club, he made his senior debut with FC Brașov in the Romanian Liga I, signing alongside compatriot Ricardo Machado.

In the summer of 2013, after one and a half seasons in the Cypriot First Division with two teams, Sousa moved back to his homeland by joining Sporting CP's reserves of the Segunda Liga. Subsequently, he returned to top-flight football with Belgian Pro League's Waasland-Beveren.

On 13 January 2017, Aris Thessaloniki F.C. announced the signing of Sousa on a one-and-a-half-year deal. He made his official debut 12 days later, in a 1–1 home draw against Olympiacos F.C. in the round of 16 of the Greek Football Cup. He scored his first Football League goal on 9 April, helping to a 2–0 home win over Kallithea FC.

Sousa agreed to extend his contract on 20 June 2018, until 2020. On 19 October 2020, he joined Romanian club FC Astra Giurgiu on a one-year deal.

== Career statistics ==
As of 16 October 2021

Club	Season	League		Cup		Continental		Other		Total	
Club	Season	Apps	Goals	Apps	Goals	Apps	Goals	Apps	Goals	Apps	Goals
Brașov	2011–12	2	0	1	0	—		0	0	3	0
Brașov	Total	2	0	1	0	—		0	0	3	0
AEL Limassol	2011–12	1	0	0	0	—		—		1	0
AEL Limassol	Total	1	0	0	0	—		—		1	0
AEP	2012–13	12	1	2	1	—		—		14	2
AEP	Total	12	1	2	1	—		—		14	2
Sporting CP B	2013–14	22	0	0	0	—		—		22	0
Sporting CP B	Total	22	0	0	0	—		—		22	0
Waasland-Beveren	2014–15	17	0	1	0	—		—		18	0
Waasland-Beveren	2015–16	7	1	0	0	—		—		7	1
Waasland-Beveren	Total	24	1	1	0	—		—		25	1
Aris	2016–17	18	1	2	0	—		—		20	1
Aris	2017–18	28	3	3	0	—		—		31	3
Aris	2018–19	7	0	2	0	—		—		9	0
Aris	2019–20	14	0	2	0	0	0	—		16	0
Aris	Total	67	4	9	0	0	0	0	0	76	4
Astra Giurgiu	2020–21	21	1	3	0	—		—		24	1
Astra Giurgiu	Total	21	1	3	0	—		—		24	1
Sepsi OSK	2021–22	6	0	1	0	1	0	—		8	0
Sepsi OSK	Total	6	0	1	0	1	0	—		8	0
Career total		155	7	17	1	1	0	0	0	173	8

== Honours ==
AEL Limassol

- Cypriot First Division: 2011–12
- Cypriot Cup runner-up: 2011–12

Sepsi OSK

- Cupa României: 2021–22
