= Georgios Delizisis =

Greek executive and retired association football player (born 1987)

Personal information
- Full name: Georgios Delizisis
- Date of birth: 1 December 1987 (age 38)
- Place of birth: Galatini, Greece
- Height: 1.91 m (6 ft 3 in)
- Position: Centre-back

Youth career
- 2000–2007: Galatini

Senior career*
Years	Team	Apps	(Gls)
2007–2011	Eordaikos	103	(3)
2011–2012	Pontioi Katerini	7	(1)
2012	Niki Volos	17	(0)
2012–2014	Apollon Smyrnis	66	(4)
2014–2015	AEL	32	(2)
2015–2017	Apollon Smyrnis	61	(3)
2017–2022	Aris	103	(3)
2022–2023	Niki Volos	10	(1)
2023–2024	Aris	1	(0)
- * Club domestic league appearances and goals as of May 25, 2026

Giorgos Delizisis (Greek: Γιώργος Δεληζήσης; born 1 December 1987) is a Greek retired professional association football player who played as a centre-back.

== Career ==
=== Aris Thessaloniki ===
On 27 July 2017, Aris Thessaloniki officially announced the signing of the experienced defender on a two-year contract. On 25 November 2017, he scored his first goal in a 2–1 home win against Panachaiki, after a cross from Vangelis Platellas. On 4 February 2018, he scored the only goal in a 1–0 home win against Sparti. On 1 April 2018, his goal gave his team an important home win against Doxa Drama, edging one step closer to the promotion.

On 5 March 2019, Delizisis signed a contract extension, running until the summer of 2021.

On 15 June 2021, Aris renewed their contract for another year, i.e. until 2022.

== Career statistics ==
As of 21 April 2024

Club	Season	League			Cup		Continental		Other		Total	
Club	Season	Division	Apps	Goals	Apps	Goals	Apps	Goals	Apps	Goals	Apps	Goals
Apollon Smyrnis	2012–13	Super League Greece 2	37	1	3	0	—		—		40	1
Apollon Smyrnis	2013–14	Super League Greece	29	3	1	0	—		—		30	3
Apollon Smyrnis	Total		66	4	4	0	—		—		70	4
AEL	2014–15	Super League Greece 2	32	2	0	0	—		—		32	2
AEL	Total		32	2	0	0	—		—		32	2
Apollon Smyrnis	2015–16	Super League Greece 2	29	3	2	0	—		—		31	3
Apollon Smyrnis	2016–17	Super League Greece 2	32	0	3	0	—		—		35	0
Apollon Smyrnis	Total		61	3	5	0	—		—		66	3
Aris	2017–18	Super League Greece 2	29	3	2	0	—		—		31	3
Aris	2018–19	Super League Greece	20	0	2	0	—		—		22	0
Aris	2019–20	Super League Greece	24	0	6	0	2	1	—		32	1
Aris	2020–21	Super League Greece	23	0	4	0	0	0	—		27	0
Aris	2021–22	Super League Greece	7	0	0	0	1	0	—		8	0
Aris	Total		103	3	14	0	3	1	—		120	4
Niki Volos	2022–23	Super League Greece 2	10	1	2	0	—		—		12	1
Aris	2023–24	Super League Greece	1	0	0	0	—		—		1	0
Career total			269	13	25	0	3	1	0	0	297	14
