= Giannis Mantzaris =

Greek footballer

Personal information
- Full name: Ioannis Mantzaris
- Date of birth: 15 April 1996 (age 30)
- Place of birth: Thessaloniki, Greece
- Height: 1.88 m (6 ft 2 in)
- Position: Goalkeeper

Youth career
- Aris Thessaloniki

Senior career*
Years	Team	Apps	(Gls)
2014–2018	Aris Thessaloniki	0	(0)
2015–2016	→ APE Langada (loan)	3	(0)
2018–2019	Apollon Larissa	29	(0)
2019–2020	Platanias	4	(0)
2020	Kalamata	1	(0)
2020–2021	Diagoras	0	(0)
2021	Apollon Pontus	1	(0)
2021–2022	Apollon Larissa	8	(0)
2022–2023	Paniliakos	0	(0)
2024–2025	Ethnikos Neo Keramidi	1	(0)
- * Club domestic league appearances and goals as of 1 July 2025

Giannis Mantzaris (Greek: Γιάννης Μαντζάρης; born 15 April 1996) is a Greek professional footballer who plays as a goalkeeper.
