= Dimitrios Diamantopoulos =

Greek professional footballer

Personal information
- Date of birth: 18 November 1988 (age 37)
- Place of birth: Thessaloniki, Greece
- Height: 1.79 m (5 ft 10 in)
- Position: Centre forward

Youth career
- 1992–1994: Ionikos Diavata
- 1994–2007: PAOK

Senior career*
Years	Team	Apps	(Gls)
2007–2009	Thermaikos	42	(9)
2009–2010	Eordaikos	26	(9)
2010–2012	Veria	14	(0)
2012	Fokikos	20	(6)
2012–2013	Kerkyra	5	(0)
2013	Apollon Kalamarias	7	(2)
2013–2014	Doxa Drama	18	(10)
2014–2016	Olympiacos Volos	34	(15)
2016	Agrotikos Asteras	13	(3)
2016–2017	Apollon Smyrnis	22	(9)
2017–2020	Aris	37	(17)
2020–2021	Chania	26	(5)
2021–2022	Xanthi	26	(10)
2022–2023	Achironas - Onisilos	25	(15)
2023–2024	Ayia Napa	20	(4)
2024–2025	Kampaniakos	14	(2)
- * Club domestic league appearances and goals as of 13 February 2025

Dimitrios Diamantopoulos (Greek: Δημήτριος Διαμαντόπουλος; born 18 November 1988) is a Greek former professional footballer who played as a centre forward.

== Career ==
Born in Thessaloniki, Diamantopoulos started his career in the youth teams of PAOK. He signed his first professional contract in 2007 for local club Thermaikos – during his two-year stay, he made a total of 42 appearances and scored 7 goals in the Football League 2. In 2009, he moved to another Football League 2 side, Eordaikos, where he made 26 appearances and scored 6 goals.

In 2010, he moved to Veria in the Football League, where he stayed for 18 months with no goals scored in 14 appearances. In January 2012 he moved to Fokikos of the same league, for which he made 20 appearances, scoring 6 goals and being one of the masterminds of the team's performance in the second half of the 2011–12 season, where the newly promoted club narrowly escaped relegation.

In July 2012 he moved to Kerkyra in the Super League Greece. He played for six months in Kerkyra and then moved to various Football League clubs, namely Apollon Kalamarias, Doxa Drama, Olympiacos Volos and Agrotikos Asteras. On 27 June 2016, he signed a two-year contract with Apollon Smyrnis. However, after the end of the season he left the team, as he wasn't part of the coach's future plans.

=== Aris ===
On 12 July 2017 he signed a two-year contract with Aris. On 12 November, the 29-year-old striker scored a brace helping his club to seal a 2–0 home win against Kallithea, which were his first goals of the 2017-18 season. One week later he scored with a penalty in a dramatic 3–2 away win against Ergotelis, after a catastrophic first half in which his team were two goals down. On 10 December he scored in a difficult 2–1 away win against Doxa Drama. On 14 January 2018 he sealed a 2–0 away win against Apollon Larissa. On 10 February, he scored in the 89th minute in a 3–1 away win against Panserraikos. On 25 February, he was the MVP of a 4–1 away win against Aiginiakos, scoring a brace. On 24 March, he scored a brace helping his club to escape with a 3–2 win against Kissamikos in its rally to win promotion to the Super League. On 15 April, he scored twice in a 5–2 home win against Panegialios. Ten days later, he scored another two goals in a 3–0 home win against Apollon Larissa. On 16 May, he scored a brace against Sparti, improving his tally to 16 goals.

On 31 October 2018, he scored both goals in a 2–1 home win against Aittitos Spata in the group stages of the 2018–19 Greek Cup. It was his first appearance of the season. On 9 December, Diamantopoulos scored his first ever Super League goal in a disappointing 4–2 away loss against Atromitos.
