= Jone Pinto =

Brazilian footballer

Personal information
- Full name: Jone da Silva Pinto
- Date of birth: 13 November 1991 (age 35)
- Place of birth: Pelotas, Brazil
- Height: 1.82 m (6 ft 0 in)
- Position: Centre forward

Youth career
- 2010: Brasil de Pelotas

Senior career*
Years	Team	Apps	(Gls)
2011–2012	Brasil de Pelotas	0	(0)
2012	→ Atlético Farroupilha (loan)	0	(0)
2012–2013	Sun Pegasus	9	(0)
2013–2014	Esporte Clube Internacional	0	(0)
2014–2015	Ethnikos Achna	10	(2)
2015	→ AEL (loan)	18	(4)
2015–2016	Lamia	34	(10)
2017–2018	Aris	0	(0)
2019	Irodotos	9	(1)
2019–2020	Aspropyrgos	11	(3)
2020	Al-Sahel	5	(2)
- * Club domestic league appearances and goals as of 16:07, 12 August 2020 (UTC)

Jone da Silva Pinto (born 13 November 1991), commonly known as Jone or Pinto is a Brazilian footballer who plays as a centre forward.

== Career ==
He began his career from the youth team of Brasil de Pelotas, and in 2012 was given on loan to Atlético Farroupilha. He has also played in Sun Pegasus, in the Hong Kong Premier League and for Ethnikos Achna, in the Cypriot First Division. On 15 January 2015, he was given on loan to AEL until the end of the season 2014-15.

Pinto moved to Super League 2 side PAS Lamia and secured 34 appearances and scored 10 goals for the side in 2015–16 season. He followed a transfer Aris in 2017 but didn't appeared for the Super League club. Initially in 2019 He was at Irodotos secured a goal for the Gamma Ethniki side.

He played for Greek side Aspropyrgos in the Football League until mid 2020.
