= Chousein Moumin =

Greek footballer

Personal information
- Full name: Chouseín Moumín
- Date of birth: 24 March 1987 (age 39)
- Place of birth: Komotini, Rhodope, Greece
- Height: 1.86 m (6 ft 1 in)
- Position: Midfielder

Team information
- Current team: Apollon Pontus
- Number: 6

Youth career
- 2003–2005: Panthrakikos

Senior career*
Years	Team	Apps	(Gls)
2005–2011	PAOK	24	(0)
2008	→ Panserraikos (loan)	10	(0)
2008–2011	→ Panetolikos (loan)	88	(3)
2011–2014	Panetolikos	40	(0)
2014–2015	Lamia	16	(1)
2015–2017	Trikala	54	(5)
2017–2018	Aris	28	(0)
2018	Iraklis	7	(0)
2019–2020	Chania	34	(0)
2020–2021	Ionikos	9	(0)
2021–2022	Diagoras	26	(0)
2022–2024	Apollon Pontus	53	(0)
2024–	Panthrakikos	0	(0)

International career
2007	Greece U21	2	(0)
- * Club domestic league appearances and goals as of 18:25, 30 June 2024 (UTC)

Chousein Moumin (Greek: Χουσεΐν Μουμίν; born 24 March 1987) is a Greek professional footballer who plays as a midfielder for Gamma Ethniki club Panthrakikos.

== Career ==
Mumin was born in Passos, Rhodope and he is of Pomak origin.

=== PAOK ===
He started his career in 2003 in Panthrakikos. During 2005, his performances with the Komotini club drew Xanthi's attention, but finally he was signed by PAOK.

=== Panserraikos ===
In January 2008, he moved to Panserraikos for a six-month loan.

=== Panetolikos ===
In 2008, Moumin signed for Panetolikos, where he stayed for three seasons.

=== Lamia ===
In 2014, Moumin signed for Lamia.

=== Trikala ===
In 2015, Moumin signed for Trikala.

=== Aris ===
On 1 July 2017, he agreed to join Aris on a two-year contract.

=== Iraklis ===
On 20 August 2018, he switched clubs, signing a contract with Iraklis.

=== AO Chania Kissamikos ===
On 23 December 2018 he signed a one-year contract with Football League side AO Chania Kissamikos on a free transfer.

Currently plays for Diagoras F.C.
