= Aristidis Lottas =

Greek footballer

Personal information
- Date of birth: 16 September 1988 (age 38)
- Place of birth: Ioannina, Greece
- Height: 1.84 m (6 ft 0 in)
- Position: Midfielder

Youth career
- –2006: Olympiacos

Senior career*
Years	Team	Apps	(Gls)
2006–2008	Olympiacos	0	(0)
2007–2008	→ Fostiras (loan)	3	(0)
2008	→ Chaidari (loan)	7	(0)
2008–2009	Lokomotiv Mezdra	12	(0)
2009–2010	Doxa Kranoula	2	(0)
2010–2011	Ethnikos Filippiada	9	(2)
2011	Kalloni	7	(0)
2011–2012	Paniliakos	18	(4)
2012–2013	Kerkyra	1	(0)
2013	Korinthos	10	(2)
2013–2014	Dotieas Agia	25	(5)
2014–2016	Kissamikos	21	(0)
2016–2017	Sparta	18	(1)
2017–2018	Aris	3	(1)
2018–2019	Olympiacos Volos	0	(0)
2019–2020	Trikala	21	(5)
2020–2022	Anagennisi Karditsa	10	(1)
2022	Iraklis Larissa		
2022–2023	Trikala		
2023–2024	Asteras Karditsa		
2024–2025	AE Mouzaki		
- * Club domestic league appearances and goals

Aristidis Lottas (Greek: Αριστείδης Λώττας; born 16 September 1988) is a Greek professional footballer who plays as a midfielder.

== Career ==
Lottas began playing football in Olympiacos' youth teams. He also played for Bulgarian A PFG club Lokomotiv Mezdra.

== Honours ==
Olympiacos Volos

- Gamma Ethniki: 2018–19
