= Michalis Bastakos =

Greek footballer (born 1996)

Personal information
- Full name: Michail Bastakos
- Date of birth: 27 July 1996 (age 30)
- Place of birth: Kalamata, Greece
- Height: 1.92 m (6 ft 4 in)
- Position: Striker

Team information
- Current team: Zakynthos
- Number: 21

Youth career
- Atromitos

Senior career*
Years	Team	Apps	(Gls)
2015–2018	Atromitos	9	(0)
2017	→ Iraklis (loan)	10	(3)
2018	Aris	9	(0)
2018–2019	Panachaiki	21	(3)
2019–2020	Apollon Larissa	20	(6)
2020–2021	Diagoras	25	(5)
2021–2022	Iraklis	29	(4)
2022–2023	Ilioupoli	26	(7)
2024	Egaleo	6	(0)
2024–2025	Pierikos		
2025	Mykonos		
2025	Saronikos Anavyssos	0	(0)
2025–	Zakynthos	36	(6)

International career^{‡}
2014	Greece U19	3	(0)
- * Club domestic league appearances and goals as of 18 October 2026 ‡ National team caps and goals as of 13 November 2014

Michalis Bastakos (Greek: Μιχάλης Μπαστακός; born 27 July 1996) is a Greek professional footballer who plays as a striker for Super League 2 club Zakynthos.
