= 2018–19 Super League Greece =

83rd season of top-tier football league in Greece

Super League Greece
- Season: 2018–19
- Dates: 25 August 2018 – 5 May 2019
- Champions: PAOK; 3rd Greek title
- Relegated: PAS Giannina; Levadiakos; Apollon Smyrnis
- Champions League: PAOK; Olympiacos
- Europa League: AEK Athens; Atromitos; Aris
- Matches: 240
- Goals: 549 (2.29 per match)
- Top goalscorer: Efthimis Koulouris (19 goals)
- Biggest home win: Olympiacos 5–0 PAS Giannina (2 September 2018); Panetolikos 5–0 Panionios (11 March 2019); Aris 5–0 Apollon Smyrnis (18 March 2019); PAOK 5–0 Levadiakos (21 April 2019); Aris 7–2 Xanthi (5 May 2019)
- Biggest away win: Panetolikos 0–5 Olympiacos (7 April 2019)
- Highest scoring: Aris 7–2 Xanthi (5 May 2019)
- Longest winning run: 10 matches Olympiacos
- Longest unbeaten run: 30 matches, the entire season PAOK
- Longest winless run: 13 matches Apollon Smyrnis
- Longest losing run: 8 matches Apollon Smyrnis
- Highest attendance: 31,250; Olympiacos 1–1 Panathinaikos (11 November 2018)
- Lowest attendance: 188; Xanthi 0–1 Levadiakos (24 February 2019)
- Total attendance: 1,282,139
- All statistics correct as of 5 May 2019.

The 2018–19 Super League Greece, or Super League Souroti for sponsorship reasons, was the 83rd season of the highest tier in league of Greek football and the 13th under its current name. The season started on 25 August 2018 and concluded on 22 May 2019 with the relegation play-offs.

AEK Athens were the defending champions. OFI and Aris joined as the promoted clubs from the 2017–18 Football League, replacing Platanias and Kerkyra who were relegated to the 2018–19 Football League.

PAOK won their third championship and their first in 34 years, by defeating Levadiakos on the penultimate matchday. They also managed to finish the season unbeaten, becoming the second club in Greek top-tier history to do so after Panathinaikos in the 1963–64 season.

PAS Giannina, Levadiakos and Apollon Smyrnis finished in the bottom 3 and were relegated to Super League 2, while OFI, who finished 13th, faced Platanias who were runners-up of the 2018–19 Football League in the relegation play-offs on May 19 and May 22 for a place in the 2019–20 Super League. OFI won the play-offs 3–2 on aggregate.

This was the last season with a 16-team championship. From the 2019–20 season, the league teams were reduced to 14, and a playoff tournament was introduced between the first six teams of the regular season, for a total of 36 games, in the style of the Cypriot First Division. Three teams relegated directly instead of the usual two and a fourth spot was decided between the 13th placed Super League team and the runner-up of the 2018–19 Football League. The fourth spot was a cause of controversy between the Super League and the HFF, however, the sporting court decided in favour of the play-off match in order to not completely diminish the chance for the second division runners-up to be promoted, as they would normally be promoted automatically in a normal season.

== Teams ==
Sixteen teams competed in the league – the top fourteen teams from the previous season, and two teams promoted from the Football League.

The first club to be promoted was OFI, after beating 1–0 Apollon Pontus on 29 April 2018. OFI would play in the Super League for the first time since the 2014–15 season. The second and final club to be promoted was Aris, after beating 2–0 Karaiskakis on 29 April 2018. Aris would play in the Super League for the first time since the 2013–14 season.

The first club to be relegated was Platanias, who were relegated on 4 April 2018 following Apollon Smyrnis' 1–0 victory against PAS Giannina, ending their 6-year stay in the top flight. The second and final club to be relegated was Kerkyra, who were relegated on 29 April 2018 following Lamia's 2–1 victory against PAS Giannina, ending their 2-year stay in the top flight.

Promoted from 2017–18 Football League	Relegated from 2017–18 Super League Greece
OFI; Aris	Kerkyra; Platanias

=== Venues ===
Locations of the 2018–19 Super League Greece teams

Note: Table lists in alphabetical order.

Team	Location	Stadium	Capacity	2017–18
AEK Athens	Athens (Marousi)	Athens Olympic Stadium	69,618	1st
AEL	Larissa	AEL FC Arena	16,118	12th
Apollon Smyrnis	Athens (Rizoupoli)	Georgios Kamaras Stadium	14,200	14th
Aris	Thessaloniki (Charilaou)	Kleanthis Vikelidis Stadium	22,800	2nd (FL)
Asteras Tripolis	Tripoli	Theodoros Kolokotronis Stadium	7,442	5th
Atromitos	Athens (Peristeri)	Peristeri Stadium	9,050	4th
Lamia	Lamia	Lamia Municipal Stadium	5,500	13th
Levadiakos	Livadeia	Levadia Municipal Stadium	5,915	10th
OFI	Heraklion	Theodoros Vardinogiannis Stadium	9,088	1st (FL)
Olympiacos	Piraeus	Karaiskakis Stadium	32,115	3rd
Panathinaikos	Athens (Ampelokipoi)	Leoforos Alexandras Stadium	16,003	11th
Panetolikos	Agrinio	Panetolikos Stadium	7,321	8th
Panionios	Athens (Nea Smyrni)	Nea Smyrni Stadium	11,700	7th
PAOK	Thessaloniki (Toumba)	Toumba Stadium	28,703	2nd
PAS Giannina	Ioannina	Zosimades Stadium	7,652	9th
Xanthi	Xanthi	Xanthi FC Arena	7,244	6th

=== Personnel, kits and TV channel ===
Team	Manager	Captain	Kit manufacturer	Shirt sponsor	Broadcast Channel
AEK Athens	(Spain) Manolo Jiménez	(Greece) Petros Mantalos	(United States) Capelli	Pame Stoixima	Nova Sports
AEL	(Italy) Gianluca Festa	(Greece) Vangelis Moras	(Italy) Legea	Thrakis Gefseis	Nova Sports
Apollon Smyrnis	(Greece) Lefteris Velentzas	(Greece) Michalis Kyrgias	(Italy) Zeus	Venetis Bakery	ERT
Aris	(Greece) Savvas Pantelidis	(Greece) Georgios Delizisis	(United States) Nike	Karipidis Pallets	ERT
Asteras Tripolis	(Greece) Georgios Paraschos	(Argentina) Matías Iglesias	(Italy) Macron	Volton	Nova Sports
Atromitos	(Austria) Damir Canadi	(Argentina) Javier Umbides	(United States) Nike	ETEKA Gas	ERT
Lamia	(Greece) Makis Chavos	(Greece) Anestis Anastasiadis	(United States) Nike	N/A	ERT
Levadiakos	(Greece) Nikos Karageorgiou	(Greece) Savvas Tsabouris	(Italy) Legea	N/A	Nova Sports
OFI	(Chile) Jaime Vera	(Greece) Anestis Nastos	(Italy) Macron	Stoiximan.gr	Nova Sports
Olympiacos	(Portugal) Pedro Martins	(Greece) Andreas Bouchalakis	(Germany) Adidas	Stoiximan.gr	Nova Sports
Panathinaikos	(Greece) Georgios Donis	(Greece) Dimitrios Kourbelis	(United States) Nike	Pame Stoixima	ERT
Panetolikos	(Greece) Traianos Dellas	(Greece) Dimitris Kyriakidis	(Italy) Zeus	Emileon	ERT
Panionios	(Greece) Akis Mantzios	(Greece) Panagiotis Korbos	(Spain) Luanvi	Tipbet.gr	Nova Sports
PAOK	(Romania) Răzvan Lucescu	(Portugal) Vieirinha	(Italy) Macron	Stoiximan.gr	Nova Sports
PAS Giannina	(Greece) Giannis Petrakis	(Greece) Alexios Michail	(United States) Nike	Vikos Cola, Car.gr	Nova Sports
Xanthi	(Serbia) Milan Rastavac	(Greece) Konstantinos Fliskas	(Spain) Joma	N/A	ERT

=== Managerial changes ===
Team	Outgoing manager	Manner of departure	Date of vacancy	Position in table	Incoming manager	Date of appointment
Olympiacos	(Greece) Christos Kontis (caretaker)	End of tenure as caretaker	6 May 2018	Pre season	(Portugal) Pedro Martins	7 May 2018
AEK Athens	(Spain) Manolo Jiménez	End of contract	25 May 2018	Pre season	(Greece) Marinos Ouzounidis	4 June 2018
Panathinaikos	(Greece) Marinos Ouzounidis	Resigned	31 May 2018	Pre season	(Greece) Georgios Donis	12 June 2018
Aris	(Greece) Dimitrios Spanos	Mutual consent	1 June 2018	Pre season	(Spain) Paco Herrera	1 July 2018
Apollon Smyrnis	(France) Valérien Ismaël	Sacked	31 August 2018	10th	(Greece) Lefteris Velentzas (caretaker)	31 August 2018
Lamia	(Greece) Babis Tennes	Resigned	4 September 2018	15th	(Greece) Makis Chavos	5 September 2018
Apollon Smyrnis	(Greece) Lefteris Velentzas (caretaker)	End of tenure as caretaker	31 August 2018	15th	(Spain) Alberto Monteagudo	12 September 2018
AEL	(Greece) Sotiris Antoniou	Resigned	24 September 2018	15th	(Italy) Gianluca Festa	25 September 2018
Apollon Smyrnis	(Spain) Alberto Monteagudo	Sacked	4 October 2018	16th	(Greece) Giannis Matzourakis	4 October 2018
Levadiakos	(Greece) Akis Mantzios	Sacked	22 October 2018	15th	(Italy) Giuseppe Sannino	22 October 2018
Aris	(Spain) Paco Herrera	Sacked	12 November 2018	7th	(Greece) Apostolos Terzis (caretaker)	12 November 2018
Asteras Tripolis	(Greece) Savvas Pantelidis	Resigned	12 November 2018	15th	(Greece) Georgios Paraschos	12 November 2018
Aris	(Greece) Apostolos Terzis (caretaker)	End of tenure as caretaker	14 November 2018	7th	(Greece) Savvas Pantelidis	14 November 2018
Apollon Smyrnis	(Greece) Giannis Matzourakis	Sacked	26 November 2018	16th	(Greece) Babis Tennes	26 November 2018
Panionios	(France) José Anigo	Sacked	2 December 2018	8th	(Greece) Akis Mantzios	4 December 2018
Levadiakos	(Italy) Giuseppe Sannino	Sacked	21 January 2019	15th	(Greece) Nikos Karageorgiou	22 January 2019
OFI	(Greece) Nikos Papadopoulos	Sacked	21 January 2019	12th	(Chile) Jaime Vera	25 January 2019
AEK Athens	(Greece) Marinos Ouzounidis	Resigned	5 February 2019	3rd	(Spain) Manolo Jiménez	6 February 2019
Apollon Smyrnis	(Greece) Babis Tennes	Sacked	9 March 2019	16th	(Greece) Lefteris Velentzas	9 March 2019

== League table ==
Pos	Team	Pld	W	D	L	GF	GA	GD	Pts	Qualification or relegation
1	PAOK (Note: PAOK were deducted 2 points by court decision.) (C)	30	26	4	0	66	14	+52	80	Qualification for the Champions League third qualifying round
2	Olympiacos	30	24	3	3	71	17	+54	75	Qualification for the Champions League second qualifying round
3	AEK Athens (Note: AEK Athens were deducted 3 points by court decision.)	30	18	6	6	50	19	+31	57	Qualification for the Europa League third qualifying round
4	Atromitos	30	15	7	8	41	28	+13	52	Qualification for the Europa League second qualifying round
5	Aris	30	15	4	11	46	33	+13	49	Qualification for the Europa League second qualifying round
6	Panionios	30	11	5	14	27	45	−18	38	
7	Lamia	30	9	10	11	28	37	−9	37	
8	Panathinaikos (Note: Panathinaikos were deducted 11 points. 6 points for financial reasons plus 5 points by court decision.)	30	13	8	9	38	30	+8	36 (Note: Head-to-head points: Panathinaikos 6, Panetolikos 0.)	
9	Panetolikos	30	10	6	14	34	48	−14	36	
10	AEL	30	8	10	12	26	34	−8	34	
11	Asteras Tripolis	30	8	9	13	25	30	−5	33	
12	Xanthi	30	7	11	12	22	34	−12	32 (Note: Head-to-head points: Xanthi 4, OFI 1.)	
13	OFI (O)	30	7	11	12	30	42	−12	32	Qualification for the relegation play-offs
14	PAS Giannina (R)	30	7	6	17	19	38	−19	27	Relegation to Super League 2
15	Levadiakos (R)	30	5	6	19	15	45	−30	21	Relegation to Super League 2
16	Apollon Smyrnis (R)	30	2	4	24	11	55	−44	10	Relegation to Super League 2

Source: Super League Greece
Rules for classification: 1) Points; 2) Head-to-head points; 3) Head-to-head goal difference; 4) Goal difference; 5) Goals scored; 6) Goals against 7) Play-offs (neutral ground); 8) Draw.
(Note: Criteria 7 is only used if needed to decide champion, teams for relegation or teams for UEFA competitions).
(C) Champions; (O) Play-off winners; (R) Relegated

== Results ==
Home \ Away	AEK	AEL	APS	ARIS	AST	ATR	LAM	LEV	OFI	OLY	PAO	PNE	PGSS	PAOK	PAS	XAN
AEK Athens	—	0–1	2–1	4–0	3–0	0–2	2–0	1–0	1–0	1–1	0–0	4–0	4–0	1–1	2–0	2–0
AEL	0–0	—	3–0	0–0	2–1	0–1	1–2	2–0	0–0	0–3	1–3	1–0	4–2	1–1	2–0	1–1
Apollon Smyrnis	0–2	0–1	—	1–2	0–2	1–1	0–3	0–0	0–0	0–2	1–3	0–1	0–2	1–5	1–2	1–0
Aris	2–0	2–0	5–0	—	2–0	0–2	1–0	2–0	3–1	0–1	1–1	1–2	1–1	1–2	1–0	7–2
Asteras Tripolis	0–1	2–0	2–0	0–3	—	1–1	0–0	0–0	2–1	0–2	1–1	3–0	3–0	0–3	1–0	0–1
Atromitos	0–1	2–0	1–0	4–2	3–2	—	1–0	1–0	0–2	1–2	2–0	2–2	3–0	1–1	1–0	0–0
Lamia	2–2	2–1	2–1	0–3	0–0	2–1	—	3–2	1–1	1–3	1–0	0–2	1–0	0–1	1–1	0–0
Levadiakos	0–3	1–1	1–0	1–0	0–2	0–2	1–1	—	2–1	0–2	0–0	1–0	1–2	1–2	0–2	1–2
OFI	0–3	0–0	0–0	1–2	1–1	1–1	1–3	2–0	—	1–0	3–1	3–0	1–1	1–3	1–0	0–0
Olympiacos	4–1	4–0	1–0	4–1	2–1	2–1	3–0	1–0	5–1	—	1–1	2–1	4–0	0–1	5–0	4–0
Panathinaikos	0–0	1–1	5–1	2–0	1–0	1–0	3–1	3–0	1–3	0–3	—	4–0	1–0	0–2	2–1	2–2
Panetolikos	2–1	2–2	2–1	1–2	1–1	1–2	2–2	2–1	2–1	0–5	0–1	—	5–0	1–2	1–0	0–0
Panionios	0–2	1–0	0–1	1–0	1–0	2–2	1–0	1–1	2–2	0–1	2–0	3–0	—	0–1	2–1	1–0
PAOK	2–0	2–1	2–0	1–1	1–0	3–0	3–0	5–0	4–0	3–1	2–0	2–1	3–0	—	2–1	2–0
PAS Giannina	0–4	0–0	1–0	1–0	0–0	0–2	0–0	2–0	1–1	1–2	1–0	0–2	3–1	0–2	—	0–0
Xanthi	1–3	1–0	2–0	0–1	0–0	2–1	0–0	0–1	3–0	1–1	0–1	1–1	0–1	1–2	2–1	—

Source: Super League Greece
Legend: Blue = home team win; Yellow = draw; Red = away team win.
For upcoming matches, an "a" indicates there is an article about the rivalry between the two participants.

== Positions by round ==
The table lists the positions of teams after each week of matches. In order to preserve chronological evolvements, any postponed matches are not included in the round at which they were originally scheduled, but added to the full round they were played immediately afterwards.

Team ╲ Round	1	2	3	4	5	6	7	8	9	10	11	12	13	14	15	16	17	18	19	20	21	22	23	24	25	26	27	28	29	30
PAOK	8	4	4	2	1	1	1	1	1	1	1	1	1	1	1	1	1	1	1	1	1	1	1	1	1	1	1	1	1	1
Olympiacos	5	1	1	1	5	3	4	4	3	3	3	2	3	2	2	2	2	2	2	2	2	2	2	2	2	2	2	2	2	2
AEK Athens	2	3	2	5	3	6	3	3	5	5	7	4	4	4	4	3	3	3	3	3	3	3	4	3	3	3	3	3	3	3
Atromitos	3	5	5	3	2	2	2	2	2	2	2	3	2	3	3	4	4	4	4	4	4	4	3	4	4	4	4	4	4	4
Aris	1	2	3	4	4	4	6	8	7	7	5	6	6	7	7	6	8	6	5	5	5	5	5	5	5	5	5	5	5	5
Panionios	7	10	13	14	11	9	9	10	9	8	8	8	8	10	9	10	10	9	9	9	10	10	10	12	9	10	9	7	6	6
Lamia	15	15	16	15	14	13	10	9	10	10	10	12	13	14	14	13	12	10	11	11	9	9	9	9	8	8	8	8	8	7
Panathinaikos	16	12	7	6	6	5	5	6	6	6	4	5	5	5	5	5	5	5	6	6	6	6	6	7	7	6	6	9	10	8
Panetolikos	9	6	6	9	10	8	8	7	8	9	9	9	9	6	6	8	7	8	7	7	8	7	7	6	6	7	7	6	7	9
AEL	4	8	9	11	8	10	11	11	11	11	11	10	11	11	11	9	9	11	12	12	11	12	12	11	12	9	10	10	9	10
Asteras Tripolis	11	14	15	10	12	12	14	14	14	15	13	11	10	9	10	11	11	12	10	10	12	11	11	10	11	12	12	12	12	11
Xanthi	13	11	11	8	7	7	7	5	4	4	6	7	7	8	8	7	6	7	8	8	7	8	8	8	10	11	11	11	11	12
OFI	6	9	12	13	15	15	13	12	12	13	15	14	12	13	13	12	14	14	13	14	14	15	15	15	14	14	14	13	13	13
PAS Giannina	14	16	10	7	9	11	12	13	13	14	12	13	14	12	12	14	13	13	14	13	13	13	13	13	13	13	13	14	14	14
Levadiakos	12	7	8	12	13	14	15	15	15	12	14	15	15	15	15	15	15	15	15	15	15	14	14	14	15	15	15	15	15	15
Apollon Smyrnis	10	13	14	16	16	16	16	16	16	16	16	16	16	16	16	16	16	16	16	16	16	16	16	16	16	16	16	16	16	16

Champion and Champions League third qualifying round
Champions League second qualifying round
Europa League third qualifying round
Europa League second qualifying round
Qualification for the relegation play-offs
Relegation to 2019–20 Super League Greece 2

Source: Super League Greece

== Relegation play-offs ==
Summary
Team 1	Agg.	Team 2	1st leg	2nd leg
Platanias	2–3	OFI	0–0	2–3

19 May 2019
21:30 EEST

Platanias	0–0	OFI
	Report

Perivolia Municipal Stadium, Chania
Attendance: 2,700
Referee: Athanasios Tzilos (Larissa)
22 May 2019
19:00 EEST

OFI	3–2	Platanias
Neira 11' (pen.); Giakoumakis 70'; Nabi 90+6'	Report	Tsamouris 42'; Papanikolaou 90+2'

Theodoros Vardinogiannis Stadium, Heraklion
Attendance: 6,500
Referee: Georgios Kominis (Thesprotia)

OFI won 3–2 on aggregate and retained their spot in 2019–20 Super League. Platanias placed in 2019–20 Super League 2.

== Season statistics ==
=== Top scorers ===
As of 5 May 2019

Rank	Player	Club	Goals
1	(Greece) Efthymis Koulouris	Atromitos	19
2	(Argentina) Ezequiel Ponce	AEK Athens	16
3	(Greece) Kostas Fortounis	Olympiacos	12
4	(Egypt) Ahmed Hassan	Olympiacos	11
5	(Greece) Georgios Masouras	Panionios / Olympiacos	10
5	(Italy) Federico Macheda	Panathinaikos	10
5	(Argentina) Mateo García	Aris	10
8	(Serbia) Aleksandar Prijović	PAOK	9
8	(Tunisia) Hamza Younés	Aris	9
8	(Argentina) Jerónimo Barrales	Lamia	9

=== Top assists ===
As of 5 May 2019

Rank	Player	Club	Assists
1	(Greece) Kostas Fortounis	Olympiacos	9
2	(Portugal) Daniel Podence	Olympiacos	8
3	(Netherlands) Diego Biseswar	PAOK	7
4	(Croatia) Marko Livaja	AEK Athens	6
4	(Greece) Petros Mantalos	AEK Athens	6
4	(Norway) Omar Elabdellaoui	Olympiacos	6
4	(Brazil) Léo Jabá	PAOK	6
4	(Greece) Dimitrios Pelkas	PAOK	6

== Awards ==
=== Annual awards ===
Annual awards were announced on 28 January 2020.

Award	Winner	Club
Greek of the Season	(Greece) Kostas Fortounis	Olympiacos
Foreign Player of the Season	(Portugal) Vieirinha	PAOK
Young Player of the Season	(Greece) Giannis Bouzoukis	Panathinaikos
Goalkeeper of the Season	(Greece) Alexandros Paschalakis	PAOK
Golden Boot	(Greece) Efthymis Koulouris	Atromitos
Manager of the Season	(Romania) Răzvan Lucescu	PAOK

Team of the Season
Goalkeeper	(Greece) Alexandros Paschalakis (PAOK)				
Defence	(Norway) Omar Elabdellaoui (Olympiacos)		(Greece) Spyros Risvanis (Atromitos)	(Cape Verde) Fernando Varela (PAOK)	(Portugal) Vieirinha (PAOK)
Midfield	(Portugal) Daniel Podence (Olympiacos)	(Greece) Dimitrios Kourbelis (Panathinaikos)	(Greece) Kostas Fortounis (Olympiacos)	(Brazil) Guilherme (Olympiacos)	(Greece) Georgios Masouras (Panionios/Olympiacos)
Attack	(Greece) Efthymis Koulouris (Atromitos)				

== Attendances ==
=== Overall ===
Olympiacos drew the highest average home attendance in the 2018–19 edition of the Super League.

Pos	Team	Total	High	Low	Average	Change
1	Olympiacos (15)	316,095	31,250	12,012	21,073	+10.3%
2	PAOK (15)	279,590	26,007	10,837	18,639	+10.0%
3	AEK Athens (15)	125,077	27,419	1,594	9,621	−38.4%
4	Aris (15)	133,782	16,434	4,501	8,919	n/a^{1}
5	Panathinaikos (15)	109,286	24,731	1,475	8,407	+21.0%
6	OFI (15)	54,875	5,867	2,344	3,658	n/a^{1}
7	PAS Giannina (15)	40,154	3,630	2,058	2,677	+16.1%
8	AEL (15)	37,534	4,082	1,349	2,502	−35.3%
9	Panetolikos (15)	35,881	3,541	1,647	2,392	−1.2%
10	Asteras Tripolis (15)	30,466	5,011	787	2,031	+10.3%
11	Lamia (15)	28,269	3,315	888	1,885	−2.9%
12	Panionios (15)	25,492	4,414	806	1,699	−0.9%
13	Xanthi (15)	22,354	6,558	188	1,490	−4.3%
14	Levadiakos (15)	19,718	2,115	569	1,315	+13.8%
15	Apollon Smyrnis (15)	11,798	3,002	219	787	−55.7%
16	Atromitos (15)	11,767	1,673	292	784	−10.8%
	League total	1,282,138	31,250	188	5,432	+28.2%

Updated to games played on 5 May 2019
Source: Super League Greece
Notes:
1: Team was promoted from the 2017–18 Football League.

=== Home matches played ===
Team \ Match played	Regular season															Total
Team \ Match played	1	2	3	4	5	6	7	8	9	10	11	12	13	14	15	Total
AEK Athens	7,504	10,433	27,419	—	24,731	6,114	5,541	5,124	7,518	7,580	1,594	10,145	6,556	—	6,318	125,077 (13)
AEL	3,646	1,637	3,071	2,708	1,991	2,855	1,349	2,569	1,867	1,989	2,376	4,082	3,101	2,571	3,622	37,534 (15)
Apollon Smyrnis	632	837	563	3,002	912	601	442	374	482	505	346	851	219	1,583	2,867	11,798 (15)
Aris	11,671	13,904	6,327	16,434	8,243	9,498	5,651	4,501	9,668	8,139	6,856	7,834	8,016	8,084	7,956	133,782 (15)
Asteras Tripolis	3,844	1,428	4,564	1,224	1,134	1,264	1,216	2,115	787	1,394	2,184	2,273	1,962	4,933	2,147	30,466 (15)
Atromitos	542	587	635	630	754	1,635	1,673	860	537	435	812	799	669	1,264	2,205	11,767 (15)
Levadiakos	698	757	569	1,248	1,214	2,825	1,405	1,505	1,296	1,989	1,184	1,356	1,468	1,897	2,307	19,718 (15)
OFI	5,186	4,701	5,463	3,488	2,432	4,932	2,653	2,381	3,007	2,816	3,469	3,875	3,632	3,804	3,036	54,875 (15)
Olympiacos	15,123	19,678	22,800	30,532	31,250	19,250	19,231	19,172	15,123	20,624	17,544	31,717	18,470	17,868	17,713	316,095 (15)
Panathinaikos	5,974	12,881	3,810	12,636	24,731	4,696	6,064	3,558	2,974	2,058	10,145	—	1,475	9,485	—	109,286 (13)
Panetolikos	2,075	2,344	1,899	2,004	2,213	3,541	1,924	3,520	2,075	1,919	2,318	2,242	2,384	2,196	3,227	35,881 (15)
Panionios	1,689	4,414	2,373	2,140	1,170	806	876	2,126	1,126	1,227	896	1,644	1,785	1,518	1,702	25,492 (15)
PAOK	16,255	23,763	15,918	15,168	14,747	15,219	10,837	15,961	15,619	25,097	22,544	19,941	18,918	17,104	17,499	279,590 (15)
PAS Giannina	2,924	2,306	2,772	2,058	3,052	2,149	3,630	2,072	3,564	2,272	2,079	2,435	2,802	2,736	3,303	40,154 (15)
Lamia	1,572	1,711	1,633	1,563	1,697	2,528	2,075	1,894	2,103	1,394	1,916	2,459	3,315	1,828	2,581	28,269 (15)
Xanthi	1,933	1,064	1,057	1,017	1,342	940	806	188	884	851	1,406	1,365	1,579	1,519	2,403	22,354 (15)
League total																1,282,138

Source: Super League Greece
