= List of Greek football transfers summer 2018 =

This is a list of Greek football transfers for the 2018–19 summer transfer window by club. Only transfers of clubs in the Super League Greece are included.

== Super League Greece ==
Note: Flags indicate national team as has been defined under FIFA eligibility rules. Players may hold more than one non-FIFA nationality.

=== AEK Athens ===
In:

No.	Pos.	Nation	Player
4	DF	GRE	Marios Oikonomou (on loan from (Italy) Bologna, previously on loan at (Italy) Bari)
7	FW	GRE	Christos Albanis (from Apollon Smyrnis)
10	FW	CRO	Marko Livaja (from (Spain) Las Palmas, previously on loan)
11	FW	GRE	Giannis Gianniotas (from Olympiacos, previously on loan at (Spain) Real Valladolid)
22	FW	ARG	Ezequiel Ponce (on loan from (Italy) Roma, previously on loan at (France) Lille)
24	DF	GRE	Stratos Svarnas (from Xanthi)
31	FW	ARG	Lucas Boyé (on loan from (Italy) Torino, previously on loan at (Spain) Celta)
40	GK	GRE	Makis Giannikoglou (from PAS Giannina)
95	MF	BRA	Alef (on loan from (Portugal) Braga, previously on loan at (Cyprus) Apollon Limassol)
—	MF	BRA	Pedro Vitor (from (Brazil) Sport Recife)

Out:

No.	Pos.	Nation	Player
4	DF	BIH	Ognjen Vranješ (to (Belgium) Anderlecht)
7	FW	GRE	Lazaros Christodoulopoulos (to Olympiacos)
11	FW	ARG	Sergio Araujo (loan return to (Spain) Las Palmas)
18	MF	SWE	Jakob Johansson (to (France) Rennes)
21	MF	GRE	Panagiotis Kone (loan return to (Italy) Udinese)
22	GK	GRE	Giannis Anestis (to (Israel) Hapoel Be'er Sheva)
24	MF	IRN	Masoud Shojaei (to (Iran) Tractor Sazi)
31	FW	GRE	Dimitris Melikiotis (to Volos)
55	DF	GRE	Adam Tzanetopoulos (to Apollon Smyrnis)
87	GK	GRE	Panagiotis Dounis (released)
98	GK	GRE	Athanasios Pantos (to Sparta)
—	MF	BRA	Pedro Vitor (to Aris)

=== AEL ===
In:

No.	Pos.	Nation	Player
5	MF	MKD	Milovan Petrovikj (from (Croatia) Osijek, previously on loan at (Romania) Sepsi Sfântu Gheorghe)
7	FW	ALG	Samy Frioui (from (Algeria) USM Blida)
17	FW	EGY	Basem Morsy (on loan from (Egypt) Zamalek)
20	DF	GRE	Nikos Karanikas (from PAS Giannina)
21	FW	GRE	Nasos Nikoloudis (from Kerkyra U20)
27	MF	GRE	Paschalis Kassos (from Aris)
30	GK	GRE	Nestoras Gekas (from Anagennisi Karditsas)
35	MF	GRE	Lefteris Bamis (from Iraklis Larissa)
55	DF	GRE	Christos Gromitsaris (from Kerkyra)
77	MF	KOS	Suad Sahiti (from (Albania) Skënderbeu Korçë)
85	MF	GRE	Alexandros Chalatsis (from Dotieas Agia)
—	FW	ESP	Piti (from Lamia)
—	FW	SVN	Marko Nunić (from (Slovenia) Aluminij)
—	GK	ISL	Ögmundur Kristinsson (from (Netherlands) Excelsior)
—	FW	BIH	Petar Kunić (from (Bosnia and Herzegovina) Borac Banja Luka)
—	GK	GRE	Panagiotis Paiteris (from Apollon Larissa)
—	DF	GRE	Theodoros Tripotseris (from Levadiakos)
—	MF	ESP	Noé Acosta (from Lamia)
—	DF	GRE	Manolis Bertos (from Asteras Tripolis)
—	MF	GRE	Kenan Bargan (from Aris)
—	DF	FRA	Alexandre Coeff (from (Italy) Udinese)

Out:

No.	Pos.	Nation	Player
1	GK	MNE	Mladen Božović (released)
6	MF	GRE	Anastasios Lagos (released)
9	FW	ARG	Emanuel Perrone (to Iraklis)
10	FW	GRE	Thomas Nazlidis (to Aris)
12	FW	CRO	Sandi Križman (to PAS Giannina)
17	DF	BRA	Wallace (released)
18	DF	GRE	Vasilios Rentzas (to Panionios)
20	MF	CRO	Adnan Aganović (to (Turkey) Altay)
21	DF	GRE	Giannis Masouras (to Olympiacos)
24	DF	GRE	Angelos Karatasios (to Olympiacos)
25	GK	GRE	Kostas Theodoropoulos (to Apollon Pontus)
27	DF	SRB	Marko Jovanović (to (Serbia) Voždovac)
33	MF	SRB	Nemanja Mladenović (to (Serbia) Bačka Bačka Palanka)
67	GK	GRE	Gennadios Xenodochof (released)
71	MF	GRE	Andreas Dermitzakis (to (Serbia) Radnik Surdulica)
99	GK	GRE	Alexandros Safarikas (to (Italy) Lecco)
—	MF	GRE	Dimitris Grontis (to Aittitos Spata, previously on loan at Trikala)
—	FW	GRE	Tasos Kritikos (to Doxa Drama, previously on loan at Panserraikos)
—	FW	GRE	Dimitris Kapos (to Trikala, previously on loan)

=== Apollon Smyrnis ===
In:

No.	Pos.	Nation	Player
—	GK	GRE	Lefteris Astras (from Panionios)
—	FW	GER	Justin Eilers (from (Germany) Werder Bremen)
—	MF	FRA	Kevin Tapoko (from (Cyprus) Aris Limassol)
—	FW	GRE	Vangelis Mantzios (free agent)
—	FW	LBN	Hilal El-Helwe (from (Germany) Hallescher FC)
—	MF	ALB	Klodian Gino (from Panachaiki)
—	DF	GER	Kofi Schulz (from (Switzerland) Winterthur)
—	MF	URU	Gonzalo González (from (Argentina) Arsenal Sarandí)
—	DF	GRE	Adam Tzanetopoulos (from AEK Athens)
—	MF	BRA	Thomás (from (Brazil) Londrina)
—	DF	GER	Kevin Pezzoni (from (Germany) Wehen Wiesbaden)
—	FW	GRE	Panagiotis Triadis (from Xanthi)
—	DF	GRE	Spyros Vlachos (from Aiginiakos)
—	FW	ARG	Luis Salces (from (Argentina) Gimnasia de Jujuy)

Out:

No.	Pos.	Nation	Player
1	GK	CRO	Ivan Čović (to (Romania) Sepsi Sfântu Gheorghe)
6	MF	GRE	Stavros Tsoukalas (released)
9	FW	IRL	Anthony Stokes (released)
11	FW	NED	Darren Maatsen (to (Netherlands) Waalwijk)
13	MF	GRE	Giorgos Zisopoulos (to Levadiakos)
14	FW	GRE	Christos Albanis (to AEK Athens)
15	FW	ISR	Eli Elbaz (to (Israel) Hapoel Haifa)
19	MF	GRE	Kostas Mendrinos (released)
20	FW	ESP	Añete (released)
21	FW	ARG	Gonzalo Castillejos (to (Argentina) San Martín)
24	DF	GRE	Anastasios Papazoglou (το OFI)
30	MF	ARG	Axel Juárez (to (Argentina) Nueva Chicago)
82	DF	ARG	Sebastián Bartolini (retired)
84	MF	SRB	Enver Alivodić (to (Serbia) Napredak Kruševac)
88	GK	GRE	Dimitrios Tairis (to Trikala)
90	MF	ESP	Didac Devesa (to (Cyprus) Ermis Aradippou)

=== Aris ===
In:

No.	Pos.	Nation	Player
2	DF	GRE	Dimitris Konstantinidis (from (Italy) Brescia)
26	MF	ESP	Javier Matilla (from (Spain) Gimnàstic)
31	DF	ESP	Álex Menéndez (from (Spain) Reus)
11	FW	ARG	Mateo García (on loan from (Spain) Las Palmas, previously on loan at (Spain) Alcorcón)
10	MF	ARG	Nicolás Colazo (on loan from (Argentina) Boca Juniors, previously on loan at (Argentina) Gimnasia y Esgrima (LP))
12	DF	GRE	Stergios Kapsalis (free agent)
7	FW	FRA	Nicolas Diguiny (from Atromitos)
23	GK	ESP	Julián Cuesta (from (Poland) Wisła Kraków)
9	FW	GRE	Thomas Nazlidis (from AEL)
28	MF	BRA	Pedro Vitor (from AEK Athens)

Out:

No.	Pos.	Nation	Player
2	DF	BRA	Neto (retired)
4	DF	GRE	Stelios Marangos (released)
9	FW	GRE	Michalis Bastakos (to Levadiakos)
13	GK	GRE	Giannis Mantzaris (released)
17	FW	GRE	Vangelis Platellas (to OFI)
18	DF	GRE	Nikos Tsoumanis (released)
20	MF	GRE	Paschalis Kassos (to AEL)
21	FW	GRE	Giannis Pasas (released)
26	DF	GRE	Petros Kanakoudis (released)
28	DF	GRE	Christos Bourbos (released)
33	MF	GRE	Aristeidis Lottas (to Olympiacos Volos)
80	MF	GRE	Dimitris Kligopoulos (to Olympiacos U20)
83	MF	BIH	Branislav Nikić (to Kerkyra)
89	MF	JOR	Angelos Chanti (released)

=== Asteras Tripolis ===
In:

No.	Pos.	Nation	Player
1	GK	GRE	Nikos Papadopoulos (from Lamia)
2	DF	ARG	Patricio Matricardi (from (Argentina) Argentinos Juniors, previously on loan at (Argentina) Gimnasia y Esgrima)
3	DF	GRE	Christos Tasoulis (from Panionios)
6	MF	ESP	José Luis Valiente (from (Spain) Lleida Esportiu)
7	MF	ESP	Marc Fernández (from (Spain) UCAM Murcia)
14	MF	ARG	Franco Bellocq (from (Argentina) Independiente, previously on loan at (Argentina) Olimpo)
16	MF	ARG	Lucas Salas (from (Argentina) San Martín)
22	MF	ARG	Martín Rolle (from Kerkyra)
33	DF	ESP	Ángel Martínez (from (Spain) Zaragoza)
37	DF	GRE	Valentinos Vlachos (from Panionios)

Out:

No.	Pos.	Nation	Player
7	MF	ARG	Martín Tonso (released)
9	MF	ARG	Eugenio Isnaldo (to (Argentina) Defensa y Justicia)
18	DF	GRE	Kostas Giannoulis (released)
20	MF	KOR	Jang Gyeol-hee (released)
33	DF	UKR	Yevhen Selin (to (Hungary) MTK Budapest)
39	FW	MAR	Nabil Jaadi (loan return to (Italy) Udinese)
62	DF	GRE	Giorgos Makrostergios (released)
67	DF	GRE	Georgios Zisis (on loan to Aiginiakos)
81	FW	GRE	Alexis Nikolakopoulos (on loan to Aiginiakos)

=== Atromitos ===
In:

No.	Pos.	Nation	Player
7	FW	AUT	Armin Mujakic (from (Austria) Rapid Wien II)
10	FW	COD	Clarck N'Sikulu (from Platanias)
20	FW	GRE	Efthimis Koulouris (on loan from PAOK)
21	MF	GRE	Iraklis Garoufalias (from PAS Giannina)
25	GK	HUN	Balázs Megyeri (from (Germany) Greuther Fürth)
44	DF	GRE	Spyros Risvanis (from Olympiacos, previously on loan)

Out:

No.	Pos.	Nation	Player
10	FW	EGY	Amr Warda (loan return to PAOK)
14	FW	FRA	Nicolas Diguiny (to Aris)
17	GK	GRE	Andreas Gianniotis (to Olympiacos)
21	DF	GRE	Pavlos Kyriakidis (to OFI)
27	FW	NGA	Abiola Dauda (to (Turkey) Giresunspor)
34	GK	GRE	Vasilios Kinalis (o loan to (Italy) Torres)
—	MF	GRE	Marios Pavlis (on loan to Sparti, previously on loan at Kallithea)

=== Lamia ===
In:

No.	Pos.	Nation	Player
6	DF	GRE	Vasileios Pliatsikas (from Platanias)
8	MF	GRE	Elini Dimoutsos (from Platanias)
26	MF	GER	Denis Epstein (from Kerkyra)
27	DF	BRA	Vanderson (from Platanias)
7	FW	GRE	Thanasis Karagounis (from (Netherlands) PEC Zwolle)
9	FW	ARG	Jerónimo Barrales (from (Argentina) Gimnasia)
4	DF	NGA	Daniel Adejo (from Kerkyra)
22	GK	SRB	Bojan Šaranov (from (Serbia) Radnički Niš)
10	MF	ARG	Facundo Bertoglio (from (Kazakhstan) Ordabasy)

Out:

No.	Pos.	Nation	Player
1	GK	GRE	Nikos Papadopoulos (to Asteras Tripolis)
4	MF	NGA	Suleiman Omo (to Levadiakos)
6	DF	GRE	Dimitris Koutromanos (released)
7	FW	GRE	Michalis Frangos (released)
8	FW	GRE	Alexandros Karagiannis (to AO Chania Kissamikos)
10	MF	BRA	Wanderson (to (Bulgaria) Beroe Stara Zagora)
11	MF	ESP	Noé Acosta (to AEL)
20	MF	GRE	Nikos Anastasopoulos (to Kerkyra)
22	MF	GRE	Panagiotis Linardos (released)
29	DF	TUN	Selim Ben Djemia (released)
30	GK	GRE	Vaggelis Pitkas (released)
34	DF	UKR	Vitaliy Pryndeta (released)
37	FW	GRE	Vangelis Patsarouchas (to AO Sellana)
77	FW	ESP	Piti (to AEL)
91	FW	SRB	Nikola Ašćerić (to (Serbia) Mladost Lučani)

=== Levadiakos ===
In:

No.	Pos.	Nation	Player
6	MF	NGA	Suleiman Omo (from Lamia)
13	MF	GRE	Giorgos Zisopoulos (from Apollon Smyrnis)
19	GK	SRB	Vladimir Bajić (from (Serbia) Borac Čačak)
22	FW	GRE	Michalis Bastakos (from Aris)
31	GK	MNE	Vuko Vujović (from (Montenegro) Lovćen)
—	DF	SRB	Jovan Krneta (from (Serbia) Zira)

Out:

No.	Pos.	Nation	Player
2	DF	GRE	Theodoros Tripotseris (to AEL)
4	MF	NGA	Nwankwo Obiora (to (Portugal) Boavista)
12	FW	FRA	Chahir Belghazouani (released)
13	DF	GRE	Giannis Zaradoukas (released)
15	MF	SEN	Ibrahima Niasse (to (Morocco) Raja Casablanca)
27	MF	GRE	Nikos Kaltsas (released)
32	GK	GRE	Dimitris Sotiriou (to OFI)
39	MF	FRA	Mohamed Youssouf (to Ajaccio)

=== OFI ===
In:

No.	Pos.	Nation	Player
10	FW	GRE	Vangelis Platellas (from Aris)
11	DF	GRE	Pavlos Kyriakidis (from Atromitos)
22	MF	GRE	Panagiotis Deligiannidis (on loan from PAOK)
26	GK	GRE	Dimitris Sotiriou (from Levadiakos)
27	FW	TUN	Ismail Sassi (from (Cyprus) AEL Limassol)
29	MF	ARG	Miguel Mellado (on loan from (Argentina) Chacarita Juniors)
34	MF	GRE	Nikos Korovesis (from Platanias)
55	MF	ARG	Juan Neira (from (Mexico) Zacatepec)
—	DF	GRE	Anastasios Papazoglou (from Apollon Smyrnis)

Out:

No.	Pos.	Nation	Player
4	DF	GRE	Manolis Moniakis (released)
5	DF	GRE	Nikos Vafeas (loan return to Apollon Smyrnis)
8	FW	URU	Sergio Leal (retired)
10	MF	POR	José Coelho (released)
11	FW	GRE	Dimitrios Manos (to Olympiacos)
16	MF	GRE	Athanasios Papatolios (to Panachaiki)
21	FW	GRE	Alexandros Perogamvrakis (released)
22	MF	GRE	Nikos Pourtoulidis (released)
23	GK	GRE	Georgios Giagiozis (to Aiginiakos)
30	FW	GRE	Thanasis Topouzis (to O.F. Ierapetra)
66	MF	GRE	Dimitris Machairas (loan return to Levadiakos)

=== Olympiacos ===
In:

No.	Pos.	Nation	Player
4	MF	GUI	Mady Camara (from (France) Ajaccio)
5	MF	GRE	Andreas Bouchalakis (from (England) Nottingham Forest)
6	MF	ISR	Bibras Natcho (from (Russia) PFC CSKA Moscow)
9	FW	ESP	Miguel Ángel Guerrero (from (Spain) Leganés)
10	MF	GRE	Giannis Fetfatzidis (from (Saudi Arabia) Al-Ahli)
11	FW	GRE	Lazaros Christodoulopoulos (from AEK Athens)
12	MF	BRA	Guilherme (from (Spain) Deportivo de La Coruña)
17	FW	ARG	Matías Nahuel (from (Spain) Villarreal CF)
18	FW	EGY	Ahmed Hassan (on loan from (Portugal) S.C. Braga)
20	DF	TUN	Yassine Meriah (from (Tunisia) CS Sfaxien)
22	GK	GRE	Andreas Gianniotis (from Atromitos)
25	DF	POR	Roderick (on loan from (England) Wolverhampton Wanderers)
27	DF	GRE	Giannis Masouras (from AEL)
33	FW	GRE	Dimitrios Manos (from OFI)
35	DF	GRE	Vasilis Torosidis (from (Italy) Bologna F.C. 1909)
56	MF	POR	Daniel Podence (from (Portugal) Sporting)
25	GK	POR	José Sá (on loan from (Portugal) FC Porto)
-	DF	GRE	Stefanos Evangelou (from Panathinaikos)
—	DF	GRE	Angelos Karatasios (from AEL)

Out:

No.	Pos.	Nation	Player
2	DF	BRA	Igor Silva (on loan to (Cyprus) AEK Larnaca)
3	DF	ESP	Alberto Botía (to (Saudi Arabia) Al-Hilal)
4	MF	TOG	Alaixys Romao (to (France) Reims)
8	MF	BEL	Vadis Odjidja-Ofoe (to (Belgium) Gent)
11	FW	BEL	Kevin Mirallas (loan return to (England) Everton)
12	GK	CRO	Ivica Ivušić (to (Croatia) Osijek)
13	MF	BEL	Guillaume Gillet (released)
24	GK	BEL	Silvio Proto (to (Italy) Lazio)
56	MF	GRE	Stathis Lamprou (released)
92	FW	BRA	Sebá (to (China) Chongqing Lifan)
34	DF	CYP	Constantinos Laifis (to (Belgium) Standard Liège, previously on loan)
53	DF	GRE	Spyros Risvanis (to Atromitos, previously on loan)
36	DF	BRA	Bruno Viana (to (Portugal) Braga, previously on loan)
44	MF	SRB	Saša Zdjelar (to (Serbia) Partizan, previously on loan)
39	FW	GRE	Giorgos Xydas (to PAS Giannina, previously on loan at AO Chania Kissamikos)
70	FW	GRE	Giannis Gianniotas (to AEK Athens, previously on loan at (Spain) Real Valladolid)
94	GK	GRE	Iasonas Gavalas (to Atromitos Piraeus, previously on loan at AO Chania Kissamikos)

=== Panathinaikos ===
In:

No.	Pos.	Nation	Player
9	FW	ITA	Federico Macheda (from (Italy) Novara Calcio)
12	DF	GRE	Ilias Chatzitheodoridis (from (England) Brentford, previously on loan at (England) Cheltenham Town)
20	FW	GRE	Nikos Vergos (from Olympiacos)
29	FW	NED	Mark Sifneos (from (India) FC Goa)
32	DF	GRE	Epaminondas Pantelakis (from Olympiacos, previously on loan at Kissamikos)
44	DF	GRE	Achilleas Poungouras (from PAOK)
99	FW	GRE	Argyris Kampetsis (from (Germany) Borussia Dortmund)

Out:

No.	Pos.	Nation	Player
8	FW	SWE	Guillermo Molins (to (Sweden) Malmö FF)
9	FW	GRE	Giannis Mystakidis (loan return to PAOK)
15	DF	GRE	Tasos Avlonitis (to (Austria) Sturm Graz)
17	MF	FIN	Robin Lod (to (Spain) Sporting Gijón)
18	FW	BRA	Luciano Neves (to (Brazil) Fluminense)
41	DF	GRE	Stefanos Evangelou (to Olympiacos)
99	GK	GER	Odisseas Vlachodimos (to (Portugal) Benfica)
38	MF	GRE	Theodoros Mingos (to (Cyprus) Olympiakos Nicosia)
14	FW	GRE	Sotiris-Pantelis Pispas (to Volos)

=== Panetolikos ===
In:

No.	Pos.	Nation	Player
6	MF	SWE	Sebastian Eriksson (from (Sweden) Göteborg)
8	FW	GRE	Aristidis Kokkoris (from Panegialios)
9	FW	ARG	Nicolás Maná (from (Argentina) Cañuelas, previously on loan at (Argentina) San Martín)
16	MF	GRE	Christos Agrodimos (from Apollon Larissa)
—	GK	GRE	Nikos Giannakopoulos (from Kerkyra)

Out:

No.	Pos.	Nation	Player
1	GK	ITA	Luigi Cennamo (retired)
4	DF	POR	Miguel Rodrigues (to (Portugal) Rio Ave)
6	MF	ARG	Federico Bravo (released)
8	MF	BRA	Farley (released)
10	FW	MOZ	Clésio (released)
12	GK	GRE	Angelos Stamatopoulos (on loan to Sparti)
16	MF	BOL	Danny Bejarano (released)

=== Panionios ===
In:

No.	Pos.	Nation	Player
—	MF	GRE	Sotiris Tsiloulis (from Apollon Larissa)
—	GK	FRA	Jérémy Malherbe (from (Scotland) Dundee)
—	MF	NED	Roland Alberg (from (Bulgaria) CSKA Sofia)
—	DF	FRA	Maxime De Taddeo (from (France) Sedan)
—	MF	MLI	Abdoulaye Keita (from (France) Ajaccio)
—	DF	BRA	Luiz Gustavo (from (Brazil) São Caetano)
—	FW	FRA	Oumar Camara (from (France) Orléans)
—	DF	GRE	Vasilios Rentzas (from AEL)
—	DF	KSA	Amiri Kurdi (from (Saudi Arabia) Al-Ahli)

Out:

No.	Pos.	Nation	Player
1	GK	GRE	Lefteris Astras (to Apollon Smyrnis)
8	DF	GRE	Christos Tasoulis (to Asteras Tripolis)
11	FW	GRE	Lazaros Lamprou (loan return to PAOK)
21	MF	GRE	Manolis Siopis (loan return to Olympiacos)
25	MF	GRE	Angelos Piniotis (released)
37	DF	GRE	Valentinos Vlachos (to Asteras Tripolis)
73	GK	GRE	Georgios Bantis (released)

=== PAOK ===
In:

No.	Pos.	Nation	Player
6	DF	ROU	Alin Tosca (on loan from (Spain) Betis)
11	FW	GRE	Nikos Karelis (on loan from (Belgium) Genk)
19	MF	SWE	Pontus Wernbloom (from (Russia) CSKA Moscow)
34	DF	UKR	Yevhen Khacheridi (from (Ukraine) Dynamo Kyiv)
47	FW	ENG	Chuba Akpom (from (England) Arsenal)
98	FW	BRA	Léo Jabá (from (Russia) Akhmat Grozny)

Out:

No.	Pos.	Nation	Player
10	FW	ANG	Djalma (to (Turkey) Alanyaspor)
20	FW	GRE	Efthimis Koulouris (on loan to Atromitos)
29	FW	SVK	Róbert Mak (loan return to (Russia) Zenit)
30	DF	BRA	Márcio Azevedo (loan return to (Ukraine) Shakhtar Donetsk)
41	MF	GRE	Panagiotis Deligiannidis (on loan to OFI)
61	DF	GRE	Konstantinos Dimitriou (to (Switzerland) Basel)
—	DF	CRO	Marin Leovac (to (Croatia) Dinamo Zagreb, previously on loan at (Croatia) Rijeka)
—	FW	BRA	Jairo (to (Croatia) Hajduk Split, previously on loan at (Moldova) Sheriff Tiraspol)
—	FW	BRA	Pedro Henrique (on loan to (Kazakhstan) Astana, previously on loan at (Azerbaijan) Qarabağ)
—	MF	SVK	Erik Sabo (to (Israel) Beitar Jerusalem, previously on loan)
—	DF	GRE	Dimitris Voutsas (to Ergotelis, previously on loan at APE Langadas)
—	DF	GRE	Timotheos Tselepidis (to Panachaiki, previously on loan at Panserraikos])
—	MF	GRE	Sokratis Kyrillidis (to Paleochora, previously on loan at Pierikos)
—	GK	ALB	Jorgo Muca (on loan to Karaiskakis, previously on loan at Volos)
—	MF	CYP	Nikolas Mattheou (on loan to Karaiskakis, previously on loan at (Cyprus) Anorthosis Famagusta)
—	FW	GRE	Christos Papadopoulos (on loan to Karaiskakis)

=== PAS Giannina ===
In:

No.	Pos.	Nation	Player
4	DF	GRE	Stefanos Evangelou (on loan from Olympiacos)
9	FW	GRE	Stefanos Athanasiadis (from (Israel) Maccabi Haifa)
10	FW	CRO	Sandi Križman (from AEL)
14	FW	GRE	Georgios Pamlidis (from Kerkyra)
15	DF	UGA	Alex Kakuba (from (Portugal) Feirense)
17	MF	UKR	Orest Kuzyk (from (Ukraine) Stal Kamianske)
21	MF	COL	Fabry (from (Switzerland) Servette)
22	MF	GRE	Stefanos Siontis (from Kerkyra)
25	FW	GRE	Giannis Loukinas (from Karaiskakis)
27	FW	GRE	Giannis Mystakidis (on loan from PAOK)
28	FW	GRE	Giorgos Xydas (from Olympiacos, previously on loan at AO Chania Kissamikos)
29	FW	FRA	Jean-Baptiste Léo (from AO Chania Kissamikos)
93	GK	CYP	Neofytos Michael (on loan from (Cyprus) APOEL)
99	MF	UKR	Vladyslav Naumets (from (Ukraine) Dynamo-2 Kyiv)

Out:

No.	Pos.	Nation	Player
4	DF	GRE	Thodoris Berios (to (Hungary) Kisvárda)
9	FW	ESP	Pedro Pérez Conde (to (United Arab Emirates) Baniyas)
10	FW	GRE	Bruno Chalkiadakis (to (Romania) Hermannstadt)
14	FW	SWE	Philip Hellquist (to (Sweden) Brommapojkarna)
17	FW	ALG	Karim Soltani (released)
20	DF	GRE	Nikos Karanikas (to AEL)
21	MF	GRE	Iraklis Garoufalias (to Atromitos)
23	MF	GRE	Lampros Zacharos (released)
26	DF	GRE	Vasilis Zogos (on loan to (Italy) Alessandria)
27	MF	GRE	Giorgos Manthatis (loan return to Olympiakos)
40	GK	GRE	Makis Giannikoglou (to AEK Athens)
64	FW	FRA	Franck Betra (released)

=== Xanthi ===
In:

No.	Pos.	Nation	Player
7	MF	NED	Jeffrey Sarpong (from (Turkey) Elazığspor)

Out:

No.	Pos.	Nation	Player
4	DF	GRE	Stratos Svarnas (to AEK Athens)
7	FW	GRE	Panagiotis Triadis (to Apollon Smyrnis)
11	MF	ARG	Adrián Lucero (released)
12	MF	HON	Alfredo Mejía (to (Honduras) Real España)
99	FW	GRE	Nikos Sampanidis (released)

== Football League Greece ==
=== AE Karaiskakis ===
In:

No.	Pos.	Nation	Player
1	GK	GRE	Dimitrios Pappas (from Thesprotos)
11	FW	GRE	Christos Papadopoulos (on loan from PAOK)
15	DF	GRE	Stefanos Kapias (from Apollon Pontus)
20	MF	GRE	Alexandros Masouras (from Anagennisi Karditsa)
21	GK	GRE	Manolis Stefanakos (from Diagoras)
22	GK	ALB	Jorgo Muca (on loan from PAOK, previously on loan at Volos)
33	DF	GRE	Stavros Panagiotou (from Sparti)
40	MF	CYP	Nikolas Mattheou (on loan from PAOK, previously on loan at (Cyprus) Anorthosis Famagusta)

Out:

No.	Pos.	Nation	Player
1	GK	GRE	Charilaos Rachiotis (to PAS Acheron Kanallaki)
9	FW	GRE	Sokratis Evangelou (released)
10	MF	GRE	Anastasios Dimitriadis (loan return to PAOK)
11	FW	GRE	Stelios Makridis (to Trikala)
14	MF	GRE	Giannis Goulas (to PAS Acheron Kanallaki)
15	GK	GRE	Ilias Melkas (released)
18	MF	GRE	Nikos Kousidis (to Giouchtas)
19	MF	SRB	Bogdan Rangelov (loan return to PAOK)
20	MF	GRE	Periklis Bousinakis (released)
21	MF	GRE	George Collins (to Ethnikos Piraeus)
22	DF	GRE	Pantelis Theologou (to Trikala)
23	MF	ALB	Donaldo Açka (to (Albania) Luftëtari)
25	FW	GRE	Giannis Loukinas (to PAS Giannina)
44	DF	GRE	Nikiforos Tsontakis (released)
54	MF	GRE	Giorgos Makris (released)
55	DF	GRE	Orestis Nikolopoulos (to (Malta) Hamrun Spartans)
56	GK	GRE	Apostolos Siaravas (released)

=== Aiginiakos ===
In:

No.	Pos.	Nation	Player
—	DF	GRE	Georgios Zisis (on loan from Asteras Tripolis)
—	FW	GRE	Alexis Nikolakopoulos (on loan from Asteras Tripolis)
—	DF	GRE	Lazaros Orfanidis (from Panserraikos)
—	MF	GRE	Savvas Athanasiadis (from PAO Koufalion)
—	DF	GRE	Theodoros Sotiriadis (from Apollon Arnaia)
—	GK	GRE	Georgios Giagiozis (from OFI)
—	DF	GRE	Alexandros Spintzos (from Apollon Smyrnis U20)
—	MF	GRE	Pavlos Laskaris (free agent)
—	FW	GRE	Nikos Aggeloudis (from Diagoras)
—	MF	ESP	Pablo Gállego (from (Nicaragua) Real Estelí)

Out:

No.	Pos.	Nation	Player
2	DF	GRE	Savvas Topalidis (released)
3	DF	MLI	Hamidou Maïga (to (Turkey) Hatayspor)
8	MF	ALB	Enea Gaqollari (to Trikala)
10	MF	GRE	Nikos Zourkos (to Giannitsa)
16	FW	ALB	Kristian Kushta (loan return to PAOK)
20	DF	GRE	Panagiotis Giazitzoglou (to Niki Agathias)
21	DF	GRE	Spyros Vlachos (to Apollon Smyrnis)
24	DF	GRE	Vasilios Liolios (to Niki Agathias)
25	DF	GRE	Vlasis Andrikopoulos (to Volos)
27	GK	GRE	Athanasios Tolios (to Niki Agathias)

=== Aittitos Spata ===
In:

No.	Pos.	Nation	Player

Out:

No.	Pos.	Nation	Player
—	FW	GRE	Paolo Farinola (to Egaleo)
—	FW	GRE	Ilias Tsiliggiris (to Ethnikos Piraeus)

=== AO Chania Kissamikos ===
In:

No.	Pos.	Nation	Player
—	FW	GRE	Alexandros Karagiannis (from Lamia)
—	DF	GRE	Stratos Chintzidis (from Trikala)
—	MF	GRE	Kostas Tegousis (from Ethnikos Piraeus)
—	MF	FRA	Jérôme Simon (from (Belgium) Molenbeek)

Out:

No.	Pos.	Nation	Player
4	DF	GRE	Alkis Markopouliotis (loan return to AEK Athens)
5	DF	GRE	Epaminondas Pantelakis (loan return to Olympiacos)
7	MF	GRE	Dimitris Tasioulis (loan return to Olympiacos)
8	MF	GRE	Konstantinos Megaritis (loan return to Olympiacos)
10	FW	GRE	Nikolaos Vrettos (loan return to OFI)
11	FW	GRE	Giorgios Nikoltsis (to AEEK Synka)
12	DF	ALB	Ardit Toli (loan return to Olympiacos)
14	MF	ALB	Damian Gjini (loan return to Panionios)
18	DF	GRE	Antonis Fouasis (loan return to Olympiacos)
22	DF	GRE	Antonis Karageorgis (loan return to Olympiacos)
25	DF	GRE	Giorgos Servilakis (to Episkopi)
28	FW	GRE	Giorgos Xydas (loan return to Olympiacos)
29	FW	FRA	Jean-Baptiste Léo (to PAS Giannina)
31	GK	GRE	Iasonas Gavalas (loan return to Olympiacos)
33	MF	GRE	Kaloudis Lemonis (to (Netherlands) Telstar)
34	DF	GRE	Manolis Saliakas (loan return to Olympiacos)
87	GK	GRE	Giannis Papadopoulos (loan return to AEK Athens)

=== Apollon Larissa ===
In:

No.	Pos.	Nation	Player

Out:

No.	Pos.	Nation	Player
4	DF	GRE	Grigoris Papazaharias (to Egaleo)
6	MF	GRE	Christos Agrodimos (to Panetolikos)
7	FW	GRE	Dimitris Mavrias (to Panachaiki)
10	MF	THA	Chanawit Sansanit (loan return to (Thailand) Saraburi TRU)
12	GK	GRE	Panagiotis Paiteris (to AEL)
23	MF	GRE	Sotiris Tsiloulis (to Panionios)
28	MF	GRE	Nikolaos Soulidis (to Agrotikos Asteras)
40	GK	GRE	Giannis Firinidis (to (Cyprus) Ermis Aradippou)
45	FW	GRE	Markeljan Misku (loan return to Kerkyra)
49	MF	GRE	David Ivanidis (to Agrotikos Asteras)

=== Apollon Pontou ===
In:

No.	Pos.	Nation	Player

Out:

No.	Pos.	Nation	Player
4	MF	GRE	Alexandros Doris (to Volos)
6	DF	FRA	Cyril Kali (to (India) Kerala Blasters)
9	FW	GRE	Alexandros Symelidis (to Trikala)
10	MF	GRE	Antonis Iliadis (to Trikala)
13	MF	GRE	Alexandros Tseberidis (to Niki Volos)
15	DF	GRE	Stefanos Kapias (to Karaiskakis)
23	DF	GRE	Spyros Gougoudis (to Trikala)
31	GK	GRE	Manolis Kalogerakis (to Ergotelis)
40	FW	GRE	Andreas Vlachomitros (loan return to AEK Athens)

=== Doxa Drama ===
In:

No.	Pos.	Nation	Player

Out:

No.	Pos.	Nation	Player
8	DF	SRB	Branko Ostojić (to (Serbia) Voždovac)
11	MF	SRB	Ljubomir Stevanović (to (North Macedonia) Rabotnički)
17	GK	GRE	Ilias Vouras (to Kalamata)
29	DF	GRE	Vangelis Gotovos (to Trikala)
31	FW	GRE	Antonis Kapnidis (to Ergotelis)
91	FW	ESP	José María Cases (to (Spain) Orihuela)

=== Ergotelis ===
In:

No.	Pos.	Nation	Player
19	FW	GRE	Antonis Stathopoulos (from PAOK U20)
14	DF	GHA	Yakubu Issahaku (from (Belgium) Lierse)
31	GK	GRE	Manolis Kalogerakis (from Apollon Pontus)
15	DF	GRE	Dimitris Voutsas (from PAOK, previously on loan at APE Langadas)
29	FW	GRE	Antonis Kapnidis (from Doxa Drama)
38	MF	GRE	Ilias Tselios (loan extended from AEK Athens)
77	FW	GRE	Christos Antoniou (on loan from AEK Athens)
27	FW	GHA	Charles Kwateng (from (Belgium) Lierse)
—	MF	GRE	Konstantinos Chatzidimpas (from (Greece) PAOK U20)
—	MF	GRE	Chrysovalantis Kozoronis (Free agent)

Out:

No.	Pos.	Nation	Player
3	DF	GRE	Apostolos Doulgerakis (to Irodotos)
4	DF	GRE	Konstantinos Kyriakidis (to Almopos Aridaea)
10	FW	GRE	Nikolaos Stamatakos (to Trikala)
11	DF	CAN	James Stamopoulos (to Panachaiki)
13	DF	GRE	Manolis Nikolakakis (to Kallithea)
16	MF	GRE	Vasilis Bouzas (to (Egypt) Wadi Degla)
21	MF	ALB	Zani Kurti (to Episkopi)
33	GK	GRE	Panagiotis Ladas (to Kallithea)
38	MF	GRE	Ilias Tselios (loan return to AEK Athens)
70	MF	GRE	Georgios Angelopoulos (loan return to Panathinaikos)
99	FW	GRE	Athanasios Kyrialanis (to Niki Volos)

=== Iraklis ===
In:

No.	Pos.	Nation	Player
—	MF	GRE	Andreas Tsipras (from Trikala)
—	FW	ARG	Emanuel Perrone (from AEL)

Out:

No.	Pos.	Nation	Player
—	GK	GRE	Tryfon Gioudas (to Paleochora)
—	DF	GRE	Leonidas Kastritseas (to Sparti)
—	FW	GRE	Dimitrios Andreakos (from Agrotikos Asteras)
—	MF	GRE	Pantelis Athanasiou (to Ialysos)
—	DF	GRE	Chrysostomos Revythopoulos (loan return to Doxa Drama)
—	MF	GRE	Kostas Panagiotoudis (loan return to Doxa Drama)
—	DF	GRE	Savvas Kyriakidis (loan return to Doxa Drama)
—	FW	GRE	Pantelis Krystallis (retired)

=== Irodotos ===
In:

No.	Pos.	Nation	Player
—	MF	GRE	Michalis Avgenikou (from Rodos)
—	DF	GRE	Babis Damianakis (free agent)
—	FW	GRE	Alexandros Smyrlis (from Kallithea)
—	DF	GRE	Orestis Nikiforos (from AO Giouchtas)
—	FW	GRE	Georgios Mylonas (from PANO Malion)
—	DF	GRE	Apostolos Doulgerakis (from Ergotelis)
—	FW	GRE	Vasilis Konstantinidis (free agent)

Out:

No.	Pos.	Nation	Player
—	MF	ALB	Edison Karagjozi (released)
—	FW	GRE	Kostas Garefalakis (released)
—	FW	GRE	Alexandros Melissopoulos (released)
—	FW	GRE	Manolis Papadakis (released)

=== Kerkyra ===
In:

No.	Pos.	Nation	Player
—	DF	GRE	Dimitrios Theodorakis (from Anagennisi Karditsa)
—	DF	GRE	Angelos Vertzos (from Trikala)
—	GK	GRE	Nikos Voutselas (from Trikala)
—	MF	BIH	Branislav Nikić (from Aris)
—	GK	GRE	Christos Athanasopoulos (from (Albania) Luftëtari)
—	MF	GRE	Nikos Anastasopoulos (from Lamia)

Out:

No.	Pos.	Nation	Player
2	DF	NGA	Daniel Adejo (to Lamia)
4	MF	CYP	Kostakis Artymatas (loan return to (Cyprus) APOEL)
14	FW	GRE	Georgios Pamlidis (to PAS Giannina)
18	FW	CYP	Nestoras Mitidis (loan return to (Cyprus) AEK Larnaca)
22	MF	GRE	Stefanos Siontis (to PAS Giannina)
23	MF	ARG	Martín Rolle (to Asteras Tripolis)
26	MF	GER	Denis Epstein (to Lamia)
31	GK	GRE	Nikos Giannakopoulos (to Panetolikos)
42	GK	GRE	Andreas Kolovouris (to Panachaiki)
55	DF	GRE	Christos Gromitsaris (to AEL)
86	DF	ITA	Davide Grassi (released)
92	FW	POR	Fábio Nunes (to (Portugal) Farense)

=== Panachaiki ===
In:

No.	Pos.	Nation	Player
—	GK	GRE	Andreas Kolovouris (from Kerkyra)
—	GK	GRE	Konstantinos Kapoutaglis (from PAO Varda)
—	DF	CAN	James Stamopoulos (from Ergotelis)
—	DF	GRE	Timotheos Tselepidis (from PAOK, previously on loan at Panserraikos])
—	FW	GRE	Dimitris Mavrias (from Apollon Larissa)
—	MF	GRE	Athanasios Papatolios (from OFI)
—	MF	ARG	Israel Coll (from (Argentina) Central Córdoba)
—	FW	BUL	Anton Karachanakov (from (Poland) Cracovia, previously on loan at (Bulgaria) Beroe)

Out:

No.	Pos.	Nation	Player
3	DF	GRE	Dimitrios Agouridis (released)
4	MF	ALB	Klodian Gino (to Apollon Smyrnis)
7	FW	GRE	Lyberis Stergidis (to Volos)
8	MF	GRE	Georgios Fotakis (released)
12	GK	GRE	Kostas Chalkias (retired)
16	FW	GRE	Konstantinos Apostolopoulos (released)
18	GK	GRE	Spyros Vrontaras (released)
19	FW	GRE	Stylianos Vasileiou (released)
29	DF	GRE	Nikos Boutzikos (to Olympiacos Volos)
31	MF	GRE	Giorgos Boutivas (released)
32	DF	GRE	Dionysis Makrydimitris (released)

=== Platanias ===
In:

No.	Pos.	Nation	Player

Out:

No.	Pos.	Nation	Player
8	DF	GRE	Vasileios Pliatsikas (to Lamia)
10	FW	COD	Clarck N'Sikulu (to Atromitos)
11	MF	SRB	Miloš Stojčev (to (Bosnia and Herzegovina) Tuzla City)
12	GK	SRB	Filip Kljajić (loan return to (Serbia) Partizan)
21	GK	GRE	Dimitris Kasotakis (to Kalamata)
22	DF	ESP	Nili (released)
23	MF	MTQ	Mickael Malsa (loan return to (Netherlands) Fortuna Sittard)
25	FW	NGA	Chigozie Udoji (to (Cyprus) Enosis Neon Paralimni)
27	DF	BRA	Vanderson (to Lamia)
33	MF	GRE	Nikos Korovesis (to OFI)
40	MF	ALB	Elini Dimoutsos (to Lamia)
92	GK	GRE	Antonis Kokkalas (released)
99	FW	SRB	Filip Kasalica (to (Serbia) Rad)

=== Sparti ===
In:

No.	Pos.	Nation	Player
—	GK	GRE	Athanasios Pantos (from AEK Athens)
—	MF	GRE	Vasilios Karvounidis (from Kallithea)
—	DF	GRE	Anastasios Chouzouris (from Aspropyrgos)
—	MF	GRE	Athanasios Sarantopoulos (from Asteras Vlachioti)
—	GK	GRE	Angelos Stamatopoulos (on loan from Panetolikos)
—	DF	GRE	Kyriakos Kolliakos (from Asteras Vlachioti)
—	MF	GRE	Marios Pavlis (on loan from Atromitos, previously on loan at Kallithea)
—	FW	GRE	Alexis Asprogiannis (from AEK Athens U20)
—	DF	GRE	Spyros Odemisiotis (from (Sweden) Härnösands)
—	DF	GRE	Leonidas Kastritseas (from Iraklis)
—	FW	GRE	Evangelos-Andreas Anastasiou (from Apollon Smyrnis U20)

Out:

No.	Pos.	Nation	Player
1	GK	GRE	Asterios Giakoumis (to Olympiacos Volos)
3	DF	GRE	Stavros Panagiotou (to Karaiskakis)
4	MF	MWI	Tawonga Chimodzi (to (Cyprus) ASIL Lysi)
5	MF	GRE	Charalambos Oikonomopoulos (to Olympiacos Volos)
7	FW	EQG	Randy (to Trikala)
8	MF	GRE	Vassilis Triantafyllakos (to Trikala)
11	DF	GRE	Christos Niaros (to Trikala)
13	MF	GRE	Panagiotis Katsikis (to Aiolikos)
22	MF	GRE	Dionysis Belis (to Aspropyrgos)
27	MF	MDA	Andrei Ciofu (to (Bulgaria) Vereya)
29	FW	GHA	Eric Warden (to (Cyprus) ASIL Lysi)
55	DF	GRE	Stergios Dodontsakis (loan return to PAOK)

=== Trikala ===
In:

No.	Pos.	Nation	Player
—	GK	GRE	Dimitrios Tairis (from Apollon Smyrnis)
—	FW	EQG	Randy (from Sparti)
—	FW	GRE	Stelios Makridis (from Karaiskakis)
—	MF	ALB	Enea Gaqollari (from Aiginiakos)
—	FW	GRE	Nikolaos Stamatakos (from Ergotelis)
—	MF	GRE	Stergios Tsimikas (from (United States) Rochester Super 9)
—	DF	GRE	Stathis Syriopoulos (from Kallithea)
—	DF	GRE	Apostolos Koulpas (from Achilleas Farsala)
—	MF	GRE	Vassilis Triantafyllakos (from Sparti)
—	DF	GRE	Vasilios Patsatzoglou (from Egaleo)
—	MF	GRE	Rafail Gioukaris (from (Cyprus) Ayia Napa)
—	DF	GRE	Spyros Gougoudis (from Apollon Pontus)
—	MF	GRE	Antonis Iliadis (from Apollon Pontus)
—	DF	GRE	Pantelis Theologou (from Karaiskakis)
—	FW	GRE	Alexandros Symelidis (from Apollon Pontus)
—	MF	FRA	Aristote Madiani (from (France) Quevilly-Rouen)
—	DF	GRE	Vangelis Gotovos (from Doxa Drama)
—	DF	GRE	Christos Niaros (from Sparti)

Out:

No.	Pos.	Nation	Player
5	DF	GRE	Angelos Vertzos (to Kerkyra)
7	FW	ALB	Rodion Zguri (to Olympiacos Volos)
8	MF	GRE	Grigoris Makos (released)
9	MF	GRE	Andreas Tsipras (to Iraklis)
10	FW	BRA	Alexandre D'Acol (released)
11	FW	GRE	Vasilios Sachinidis (to Olympiacos Volos)
12	DF	GRE	Giorgos Touglis (released)
13	DF	BRA	Leandro Pinto (to Olympiacos Volos)
21	MF	GRE	Dimitris Kapos (loan return to AEL)
23	DF	GRE	Stratos Chintzidis (to AO Chania Kissamikos)
27	MF	SRB	Vladan Milosavljev (to (Albania) Luftëtari)
30	GK	GRE	Manolis Apostolidis (released)
31	MF	GRE	Kyriakos Andreopoulos (to (Germany) ZFC Meuselwitz)
32	FW	GRE	Nikos Giannitsanis (to (Germany) ZFC Meuselwitz)
37	FW	FRA	Gaël N'Lundulu (to (Cyprus) Onisilos Sotira)
39	DF	GRE	Dimitris Kotsonis (released)
66	GK	GRE	Nikos Voutselas (to Kerkyra)
68	FW	GRE	Dimitris Kapos (loan return to AEL)
77	MF	SRB	Nemanja Tomić (released)

=== Volos ===
In:

No.	Pos.	Nation	Player
—	FW	GRE	Lyberis Stergidis (from Panachaiki)
—	DF	GRE	Vlasis Andrikopoulos (from Aiginiakos)
—	MF	ARG	Lucas García (from (Finland) Inter Turku)
—	DF	GRE	Albert Roussos (from Panserraikos)
—	MF	CMR	Alberto Ngwem (from Asteras Amaliada)
—	DF	GRE	Vasilios Toulikas (from Pierikos)
—	GK	GRE	Fotis Karagiolidis (from Olympiacos Volos)
—	MF	GRE	Alexandros Doris (from Apollon Pontus)
—	DF	GRE	Kostandin Kariqi (from Anagennisi Karditsa)
—	FW	GRE	Dimitris Melikiotis (from AEK Athens)
—	MF	GRE	Konstantinos Korelas (from Anagennisi Karditsa)

Out:

No.	Pos.	Nation	Player
—	DF	GRE	Alexandros Zeris (to Kavala)
—	DF	GRE	Vasilis Kalamidas (to Almyros)
—	MF	GRE	Dimitris Diminas (to Almyros)
—	GK	ALB	Jorgo Muca (loan return to PAOK)
—	MF	GRE	Achilleas Salamouras (loan return to PAOK U20)
—	MF	GRE	Rafail Melissopoulos (loan return to Xanthi)
