= 2017–18 Ergotelis F.C. season =

Ergotelis
2017–18 season
- Chairman: Maged Samy
- Manager: Soulis Papadopoulos (18 January 2017–29 July 2017); Takis Gonias (21 August 2017–29 May 2018)
- Stadium: Pankritio Stadium, Heraklion
- Football League: 9th
- Greek Cup: Group stage, (4th in Group 6)
- Top goalscorer: League: Hugo Cuypers (22 goals); All: Hugo Cuypers (22 goals)
Home colours	Away colours	Third colours

The 2017–18 season was Ergotelis' 88th season in existence and eleventh overall in the Football League, the second tier of the Greek football league system. It was the first season of the club in the competition since the club's latest promotion as champions of the 2016–17 Gamma Ethniki Group 4, and the first season under the ownership of Egyptian businessman Maged Samy. The content of this article covers club activities from 1 July 2017 until 31 May 2018.

After hiring controversial Greek manager Takis Gonias in August 2017, the team struggled early on to earn points on the Table and became relegation contenders at an early stage during the tournament. Ergotelis' squad significantly improved and maintained an impressive good form during the second round of the competition, winning several key matches, scoring many goals, maintaining ball possession rates close to 60%-70% and eventually battling their way out of the relegation zone, mainly due to the impressive 22-goal season performance of arriving Belgian striker Hugo Cuypers.

The club also participated in the Greek Cup for the first time since its relegation to the Gamma Ethniki, exiting the competition during the group stage having suffered three consecutive losses.

== Players ==
Summer acquisition
Winter acquisition

No.	Name	Nationality	Position (s)	Date of birth (age)	Signed from	Notes
Goalkeepers
18	Georgios Chaniotakis	(Greece)	GK	23 January 1995 (23)	Youth system	
33	Panagiotis Ladas	(Greece)	GK	26 August 1994 (23)	(Belgium) KFC Oosterzonen	
97	Dimitrios Katsimitros	(Greece)	GK	12 June 1997 (20)	(Cyprus) Anorthosis Famagusta	
Defenders
2	Kyriakos Mazoulouxis	(Greece)	CB	1 May 1997 (21)	(Belgium) Lierse	
3	Apostolos Doulgerakis	(Greece)	CB	15 May 1998 (20)	Youth system	
5	Christos Batzios (C)	(Greece)	CB	15 October 1991 (26)	(Greece) Kavala	
22	Nikolaos Patas	(Greece)	CB	19 January 1997 (21)	(Greece) Kallithea	
31	Konstantinos Ikonomou	(Greece) (Hungary)	CB	16 March 1996 (22)	Free agent	
4	Konstantinos Kyriakidis	(Greece)	CB / RB	1 October 1993 (24)	(Greece) Agrotikos Asteras	
12	Stelios Labakis	(Greece)	RB	12 June 1992 (25)	(Greece) Trikala	
13	Manolis Nikolakakis	(Greece)	RB	19 February 1991 (27)	(Sweden) Akropolis IF	
11	James Stamopoulos (3rd VC)	(Canada) (Greece)	LB	24 June 1991 (26)	(Greece) Kallithea	
99	Athanasios Kyrialanis	(Greece)	LB	9 August 1999 (18)	(Greece) PAOK	On loan
Midfielders
15	Albert Bruce	(Ghana)	CM	30 December 1993 (24)	(Greece) Panegialios	
16	Vasilis Bouzas	(Greece)	CM	30 June 1993 (24)	(Greece) Panegialios	
23	Giannis Boutsakis	(Greece)	CM	8 February 1994 (24)	(Greece) Atsalenios	
6	Vasilios Vogiatzis	(Greece)	DM	10 January 1996 (22)	Youth system	
21	Zani Kurti	(Albania)	DM	6 December 1993 (24)	(Greece) Ermis Zoniana	
70	Georgios Angelopoulos	(Greece)	DM	25 February 1997 (21)	(Greece) Panathinaikos	On loan
8	Antonis Bourselis (VC)	(Greece)	AM	6 July 1994 (23)	(Greece) OFI	
20	Giannis Iatroudis	(Greece)	AM	2 February 1999 (19)	Youth system	
38	Ilias Tselios	(Greece)	AM	6 October 1997 (20)	(Greece) AEK	On loan
Forwards
14	Manolis Rovithis (2nd VC)	(Greece)	LW	16 September 1992 (25)	(Greece) Sparti	ACL rupture (injured) Source
10	Nikolaos Stamatakos	(Greece)	RW	1 January 1992 (26)	(Greece) Kallithea	
7	Georgios Manousakis	(Greece)	CF	10 April 1998 (20)	Youth system	
9	Joseph Efford	(United States)	CF	29 August 1996 (21)	Free agent	
19	Hugo Cuypers	(Belgium)	CF	7 February 1997 (21)	(Belgium) Standard Liège	

=== The following players have departed in mid-season ===
88	Ibrahima Ndiaye	(Senegal)	RW	6 July 1998 (19)	(Egypt) Wadi Degla	Loan return.
17	Georgios Lydakis	(Greece)	CF / RW	9 January 1997 (21)	← Neoi Ergoteli	Loaned out

Note: Flags indicate national team as has been defined under FIFA eligibility rules. Players and Managers may hold more than one non-FIFA nationality.

Head coach	Captain	Kit manufacturer	Shirt sponsor
(Greece) Takis Gonias	(Greece) Christos Batzios	(Italy) Lotto	(Greece) Be My Hero (4 December 2017 −)

== Transfers ==
Winter Transfer Window

== In ==
Squad #	Position	Player	Transferred From	Fee	Date
2	DF	(Greece) Kyriakos Mazoulouxis	(Belgium) Lierse	Free	22 August 2017
33	GK	(Greece) Panagiotis Ladas	(Belgium) KFC Oosterzonen	Free	22 August 2017
4	DF	(Greece) Konstantinos Kyriakidis	(Greece) Agrotikos Asteras	Free	22 August 2017
22	DF	(Greece) Nikolaos Patas	(Greece) Kallithea	Free	23 August 2017
11	DF	(Canada) (Greece) James Stamopoulos	(Greece) Kallithea	Free	23 August 2017
17	FW	(Greece) Georgios Lydakis	Neoi Ergoteli	Return	23 August 2017
21	MF	(Albania) Zani Kurti	(Greece) Ermis Zoniana	Free	25 August 2017
10	FW	(Greece) Nikolaos Stamatakos	(Greece) Kallithea	Free	25 August 2017
70	MF	(Greece) Georgios Angelopoulos	(Greece) Panathinaikos	Loan	25 August 2017
99	DF	(Greece) Athanasios Kyrialanis	(Greece) PAOK	Loan	29 August 2017
16	MF	(Greece) Vasilis Bouzas	(Greece) Panegialios	Free	29 August 2017
12	DF	(Greece) Stelios Labakis	(Greece) Trikala	Free	30 August 2017
23	MF	(Greece) Giannis Boutsakis	(Greece) Atsalenios	▼ Undisclosed	31 August 2017
88	FW	(Senegal) Ibrahima Ndiaye	(Egypt) Wadi Degla	Loan	31 August 2017
19	FW	(Belgium) Hugo Cuypers	(Belgium) Standard Liège	▼ Undisclosed	31 August 2017
8	MF	(Greece) Antonis Bourselis	(Greece) OFI	Free	10 September 2017
97	GK	(Greece) Dimitrios Katsimitros	(Cyprus) Anorthosis Famagusta	Free	10 September 2017
14	FW	(Greece) Manolis Rovithis	(Greece) Sparti	Free	10 September 2017
9	FW	(United States) Joseph Efford	Free agent	Free	10 September 2017
38	MF	(Greece) Ilias Tselios	(Greece) AEK	Loan	10 January 2018
13	DF	(Greece) Manolis Nikolakakis	(Sweden) Akropolis IF	Free	10 January 2018
31	DF	(Greece) (Hungary) Konstantinos Ikonomou	Free agent	Free	11 January 2018
15	MF	(Ghana) Albert Bruce	(Greece) Panegialios	Free	7 February 2018

=== Promoted from youth system ===
Squad #	Position	Player	Date	Signed Until
3	DF	(Greece) Apostolos Doulgerakis	TBA	30 June 2021
20	MF	(Greece) Giannis Iatroudis	TBA	30 June 2021

Total spending: ▼ Undisclosed

== Out ==
Position	Player	Transferred To	Fee	Date
FW	(Greece) Nikos Katsikokeris	(Greece) Ethnikos Piraeus	Free	7 July 2017
DF	(Greece) Minas Tzanis	(Greece) Atsalenios	Free	7 July 2017
DF	(Greece) Georgios Papapanagiotou	(Greece) Aris Petroupolis	Free	7 July 2017
FW	(Greece) Fotis Kaimakamoudis	(Greece) A.E. Kifisia	Free	7 July 2017
FW	(Uruguay) Sergio Leal	(Greece) OFI	Free	7 July 2017
MF	(Portugal) Serginho	(Greece) Rodos	Free	10 July 2017
DF	(Greece) Stamatis Karras	(Greece) Tamynaikos	Free	11 July 2017
MF	(Greece) Anastasios Rousakis	(Greece) Aittitos Spata	Free	11 July 2017
GK	(Albania) (Greece) Alexandros Leco	(Greece) Aittitos Spata	Free	12 July 2017
FW	(Albania) (Greece) Alexandros Bracjani	(Cyprus) PAEEK	Free	12 July 2017
GK	(Greece) Georgios Vasiliadis	(Greece) Doxa Drama	Free	14 July 2017
FW	(Greece) Periklis Vellinis	(Greece) Diagoras Rhodes	Free	14 July 2017
MF	(Greece) Giannis Gotsoulias	(Greece) Paniliakos	Free	14 July 2017
DF	(Greece) Thomas Garaklidis	Free agent	Free	14 July 2017
DF	(Greece) Manolis Nikolakakis	(Sweden) Akropolis IF	Free	19 July 2017
MF	(Greece) Christos Niaros	(Greece) Sparti	Free	19 July 2017
MF	(Greece) Christos Mingas	(Greece) Elpis Skoutari	Free	19 July 2017
MF	(Brazil) (Spain) Micheel	(Greece) Ethnikos Piraeus	Free	29 July 2017
FW	(Senegal) Ibrahima Ndiaye	(Egypt) Wadi Degla	Loan return	29 January 2018
FW	(Greece) Georgios Lydakis	(Greece) Atsalenios	Loan	30 January 2018

Total income: ▲€0.0

Expenditure: ▼ Undisclosed

== Managerial changes ==
Outgoing manager	Manner of departure	Date of vacancy	Position in table	Incoming manager	Date of appointment
(Greece) Soulis Papadopoulos	Contract expired.	29 July 2017	--	(Greece) Takis Gonias	21 August 2017
(Greece) Takis Gonias	Contract expired.	29 May 2018	9th	(Cyprus) Nikki Papavasiliou	29 May 2018

== Kit ==
2017–February 2018

Supplier: Lotto
Sponsor(s): Be My Hero

Home	Away

Source: ergotelis.gr

February – May

Supplier: Lotto
Sponsor(s): Be My Hero

Home	Away

Source: ergotelis.gr

Friendlies

Supplier: Lotto
Sponsor(s): None

Friendlies

Source: ergotelis.gr

== Pre-season and friendlies ==
=== Pre-season friendlies ===
Win Draw Loss

7 September 2017 Friendly	APOK Velouchi (Greece)	0–0	(Greece) Ergotelis	Karpenisi, Greece
17:30		Report		Stadium: Karpenisi Athletic Centre

15 September 2017 Friendly	Ergotelis (Greece)	3–2	(Greece) OF Ierapetra	Heraklion, Crete, Greece
19:00	Bouzas 16'; Stamopoulos 19'; Lydakis 73'	Report	Miggas 51'; Coretta 55'	Stadium: Pankritio Stadium

=== Mid-season friendlies ===
Win Draw Loss

24 September 2017 Friendly	Ergotelis (Greece)	4–2	(Greece) Ermis Zoniana	Heraklion, Crete, Greece
17:00	Lydakis 15', 24'; Rovithis 32'; Boutsakis 56'	Report	Topouzis 17', 38'	Stadium: Pankritio Stadium, Training Ground

1 October 2017 Friendly	Ergotelis (Greece)	1–3	(Greece) AO Chania–Kissamikos	Heraklion, Crete, Greece
17:00	Cuypers 55'	Report	Lemonis 10', 90+1'; Toli 13'	Stadium: Pankritio Stadium, Training Ground

2 October 2017 Friendly ^{1}	Irodotos (Greece)	1–1	(Greece) Ergotelis	Nea Alikarnassos, Crete, Greece
17:30	Gkinis 37'	Report	Rovithis 60' (pen.)	Stadium: Nea Alikarnassos Municipal Stadium

14 October 2017 Friendly	Ergotelis (Greece)	0–2	(Greece) OFI	Heraklion, Crete, Greece
19:00		Report	Chanti 33' (pen.); Ogkmpoe 80'	Stadium: Pankritio Stadium

12 February 2018 Friendly ^{1}	Irodotos (Greece)	1–2	(Greece) Ergotelis	Nea Alikarnassos, Crete, Greece
15:30	Karaghiozis 55'	Report	Ikonomou 32'; Rovithis 64'	Stadium: Nea Alikarnassos Municipal Stadium

1. 70-minute friendly.

== Competitions ==
=== Overview ===
Competition	Started round	Current position / round	Final position / round	First match	Last match
Football League Greece	1	9th / 34	9th / 34	29 October 2017	25 May 2018
Greek Football Cup	Group Stage	Group Stage	Group Stage	19 September 2017	30 November 2017

Last updated: 25 May 2018

== Football League Greece ==
=== League table ===
Pos	Team	Pld	W	D	L	GF	GA	GD	Pts
7	Apollon Pontus	34	14	11	9	43	27	+16	53
8	A.E. Karaiskakis	34	13	9	12	35	32	+3	48
9	Ergotelis	34	13	7	14	56	47	+9	46
10	Apollon Larissa (Note: Panegialios, Kallithea, Panserraikos, Sparti, Apollon Larissa, Anagennisi Karditsa were deducted six points, after their failure to pass the first stage of surveillance twice.)	34	16	1	17	45	54	−9	43
11	Aiginiakos (Note: Aiginiakos were deducted three points , after their failure to pass the first stage of surveillance)	34	11	7	16	36	54	−18	37

Source: Soccerway and Football League News
Rules for classification: 1) Points; 2) Head-to-head points; 3) Head-to-head goal difference; 4) Goals scored; 5) Goals against; 6) Play-offs (neutral ground, only used if needed to decide teams for promotion or relegation).

=== Results summary ===
Overall								Home						Away					
Pld	W	D	L	GF	GA	GD	Pts	W	D	L	GF	GA	GD	W	D	L	GF	GA	GD
34	13	7	14	56	47	+9	46	8	4	5	32	20	+12	5	3	9	24	27	−3

Last updated: 25 May 2018.
Source: Competitive matches

=== Results by Round ===
Round	1	2	3	4	5	6	7	8	9	10	11	12	13	14	15	16	17	18	19	20	21	22	23	24	25	26	27	28	29	30	31	32	33	34
Ground	H	H	A	H	A	H	A	H	A	A	H	A	H	A	H	A	H	A	A	H	A	H	A	H	A	H	H	A	H	A	H	A	H	A
Result	D	D	L	L	L	L	L	D	L	L	W	W	D	W	W	L	L	D	W	W	L	L	L	W	D	W	W	W	W	D	L	L	W	W
Position	10	10	12	13	16	17	17	17	17	17	17	16	17	14	12	13	13	13	13	12	12	12	13	12	13	12	12	11	10	10	10	13	9	9

Source: footballleaguenews.gr
A = Away; H = Home; W = Win; D = Draw; L = Loss

=== Matches ===
Win Draw Loss Postponed

29 October 2017 1	Ergotelis	0–0	Kallithea	Heraklion, Crete, Greece
15:00 EET	Bouzas (yellow card) 34'; Boutsakis (yellow card) 44'; Angelopoulos (yellow card) 83'	Report	Panagiotidis (yellow card) 34'; Vasiliou (red card) 49'; Mako (yellow card) 60'	Stadium: Pankritio Stadium; Referee: Charalambos Sotiriadis (Lasithi)

5 November 2017 2	Ergotelis	1–1	AO Chania–Kissamikos	Heraklion, Crete, Greece
15:00 EET	Cuypers 43', (yellow card) 80'; Stamatakos (yellow card) 68'; Iatroudis (yellow card) 71'	Report	Saliakas (yellow card) 18', (goal) 80'; Fouasis (red card) 65'	Stadium: Pankritio Stadium; Referee: Angelos Bakoyannis (Athens)

12 November 2017 3	Panachaiki	2–1	Ergotelis	Patras, Greece
15:00 EET	Stergidis 1'; Agouridis (yellow card) 38'; Kynigopoulos (yellow card) 58'; Makrydimitris (yellow card) 65'; Fourlanos (yellow card) 75'; Moraitis 78', (yellow card) 79'; Sotirakos (yellow card) 90'	Report	Cuypers 25'; Vogiatzis (yellow card) 47'; Stamopoulos (yellow card) 61'	Stadium: Kostas Davourlis Stadium; Referee: Spyros Selimos (Laconia)

19 November 2017 4	Ergotelis	2–3	Aris	Heraklion, Crete, Greece
15:00 EET	Cuypers 14'; Stamatakos 23'; Stamopoulos (yellow card) 70'; Batzios (yellow card) 88'	Report	Kassos (yellow card) 19'; Dounis 53'; Diamantopoulos 72' (pen.); Platellas 88', (yellow card) 89'	Stadium: Pankritio Stadium; Referee: Georgios Lambrou (Euboea)

26 November 2017 5	Doxa Drama	4–0	Ergotelis	Drama, Greece
15:00 EET	Rizogiannis 4' (pen.); Gotovos 13'; Tsoutsis (yellow card) 30'; Litskas 41'; Vitlis (yellow card) 71'; Machairas 84'	Report	Bouzas (yellow card) 72'	Stadium: Doxa Drama Stadium; Referee: Fotios Fotiadis (Kastoria)

4 December 2017 6	Ergotelis	2–4	OFI	Heraklion, Crete, Greece
17:00 EET	Ndiaye 11', (yellow card) 17'; Stamopoulos 60'; Boutsakis (yellow card) 65'; Bouzas (yellow card) 71'	Report	Kouskounas 14'; Martos 26'; Ortega 32'; Ogkmpoe 76'; Leal (yellow card) 78'	Stadium: Pankritio Stadium; Referee: Stathis Gkortsilas (Macedonia)

10 December 2017 7	Panegialios	1–0	Ergotelis	Aigio, Greece
15:00 EET	Bruce (yellow card) 38'; Arnarellis (yellow card) 45'; Georgakopoulos (yellow card) 61'; Demo (yellow card) 77'; Stamatis (yellow card) 80'; Kaznaferis (yellow card) 92'; Patas 90+4' (o.g.)	Report	Batzios (yellow card) 86'	Stadium: Aigio National Stadium; Referee: Konstantinos Balatsoukas (Thesprotia)

17 December 2017 8	Ergotelis	1–1	Apollon Pontus	Heraklion, Crete, Greece
15:00 EET	Ndiaye (yellow card) 60'; Mazoulouxis (yellow card) 68'; Cuypers 79'; Stamopoulos (yellow card) 83'	Report	Lionis 6'; Kalaitzidis (yellow card) 25'; Symelidis (yellow card) 43'; Chasomeris (yellow card) 66'; Kali (yellow card) 84'; Fábio (yellow card) 85'	Stadium: Pankritio Stadium; Referee: Andreas Gkamaris (Athens)

20 December 2017 9	Apollon Larissa	3–2	Ergotelis	Larissa, Greece
15:00 EET	Tsiloulis 29' (pen.); Savvas (yellow card) 38'; Sachinidis 58', 67', (yellow card) 68'; Kourtesiotis (yellow card) 76'; Paiteris (yellow card) 90+1'; Skoupras (yellow card) 90+3'	Report	Cuypers 13'; Stamatakos (red card) 28'; Angelopoulos 49'; Bouzas (yellow card) 61'; Batzios (yellow card) 80'	Stadium: Apollon Stadium; Referee: Stylianos Fotis (Euboea)

7 January 2017 10	A.E. Karaiskakis	2–1	Ergotelis	Arta, Greece
15:00 EET	Makirs 14'; Dimitriadis (yellow card) 44'; Loukinas 62'; Collins (yellow card) 84'	Report	Boutsakis (yellow card) 18'; Cuypers 55'; Stamopoulos (yellow card) 70'; Batzios (yellow card) 87'; Ndiaye (yellow card) 89'	Stadium: Agioi Anargiroi Municipal Stadium; Referee: Spiros Kolytas (Kerkyra)

– 11^{1}	Ergotelis	3–0 (w/o)	Acharnaikos	–
–				Stadium: – Attendance: – Referee: –

21 January 2018 12	Veria	0–2	Ergotelis	Veria, Greece
15:00 EET	Souliotis (yellow card); Bastianos (yellow card)	Report	Cuypers 44', 85'; Ladas (yellow card) 78'; Bouzas (yellow card)	Stadium: Veria Stadium; Referee: Aggelos Aggelakis (Macedonia)

27 January 2018 13	Ergotelis	0–0	Sparti	Heraklion, Crete, Greece
15:00 EET	Batzios (yellow card)	Report	Vosnakidis (yellow card); Panagiotou (yellow card)	Stadium: Pankritio Stadium; Referee: Aggelos Zaravinos (Athens)

31 January 2018 14	Panserraikos	0–1	Ergotelis	Serres, Greece
15:00 EET	Roussos (yellow card) 60'	Report	Bourselis (yellow card) 70'; Cuypers 88'	Stadium: Serres Municipal Stadium; Referee: Vasilios Fotias (Pella)

4 February 2018 15	Ergotelis	1–0	Anagennisi Karditsa	Heraklion, Crete, Greece
15:00 EET	Cuypers 43'; Mazoulouxis (yellow card) 70'	Report		Stadium: Pankritio Stadium; Referee: Ioannis Kakridis (Piraeus)

11 February 2018 16	Aiginiakos	3–2	Ergotelis	Aiginio, Pieria, Greece
15:00 EET	Petrousis (yellow card) 21'; Topalidis (yellow card) 40'; Antoniadis (yellow card) 49'; Giazitzoglou (yellow card) 66'; Papadopoulos 68'; Peric 70'; Tsolakidis 75'	Report	Bourselis 8'; Cuypers 28'; Tselios (yellow card) 54'; Iatroudis (yellow card) 66'	Stadium: Aiginio Municipal Stadium; Referee: Fotis Fotiadis (Kastoria)

18 February 2018 17	Ergotelis	0–2	Trikala	Heraklion, Crete, Greece
15:00 EET	Nikolakakis (yellow card) 50'; Bourselis (yellow card) 84'	Report	Sachinidis 1'; Makos (yellow card) 52'; Andreopoulos (yellow card) 57'; Vertzos (yellow card) 87'; Giannitsanis 90+2', (yellow card) 90+3'	Stadium: Pankritio Stadium; Referee: Dimitrios Gkovesis (Arcadia)

26 February 2018 18	Kallithea	0–0	Ergotelis	Kallithea, Athens, Greece
15:00 EET	Candé (yellow card) 60'	Report	Batzios (yellow card) 7'; Ladas (red card) 23'; Angelopoulos (yellow card) 75'; Nikolakakis (yellow card) 92'	Stadium: Grigoris Lambrakis Stadium; Referee: Nikolaos Ratsiatos (Argolida)

5 March 2018 19	AO Chania–Kissamikos	0–3	Ergotelis	Chania, Crete, Greece
17:00 EET	Lemonis (yellow card) 54'	Report	Efford 1', 39', (yellow card) 64'; Cuypers 13'; Stamopoulos (yellow card) 71'	Stadium: Perivolia Municipal Stadium; Referee: Spyridon Kolytas (Lasithi)

8 March 2018 20	Ergotelis	2–1	Panachaiki	Heraklion, Crete, Greece
17:00 EET	Efford 3'; Cuypers 90+3'; Stamopoulos (yellow card) 60'	Report	Moraitis 42'; Gino (yellow card) 54'; Fourlanos (yellow card) 64'	Stadium: Pankritio Stadium; Referee: Konstantinos Kotsanis (Drama)

12 March 2018 21	Aris	3–0	Ergotelis	Thessaloniki, Greece
15:00 EET	Pavlidis (yellow card) 38'; Platellas 54' (pen.); Nikić (yellow card) 60'; Diamantopoulos (yellow card) 64'; Moumin (yellow card) 67'; Kassos 76'; Chanti 90+5'	Report	Efford (yellow card) 49'; Batzios (yellow card) 90+4'	Stadium: Kleanthis Vikelidis Stadium; Referee: Dimitrios Rousis (Thessaly)

18 March 2018 22	Ergotelis	0–1	Doxa Drama	Heraklion, Crete, Greece
15:00 EET	Bourselis (yellow card) 53'	Report	Markopoulos 55'	Stadium: Pankritio Stadium; Referee: Nikolaos Anousos (Laconia)

24 March 2018 23	OFI	4–2	Ergotelis	Heraklion, Crete, Greece
17:00 EET	Koutsianikoulis 5', 17'; Moniakis (yellow card) 41'; Leal (yellow card) 45+1', (goal) 72'; Dinas 52'; Kiliaras (yellow card) 90'	Report	Cuypers 1'; Stamatakos 3'; Vogiatzis (red card)	Stadium: Theodoros Vardinogiannis Stadium; Referee: Charalambos Sotiriadis (Lasithi)

1 April 2018 24	Ergotelis	5–1	Panegialios	Heraklion, Crete, Greece
16:00 EET	Tselios (yellow card) 23'; Cuypers 41', 60'; Efford 57', 87'; Stamatakos 65'	Report	Grammatikas (yellow card) 18'; Skartsilas (yellow card) 28'; Stamatis 47'	Stadium: Pankritio Stadium; Referee: Petros Tsagkarakis (Chania)

4 April 2018 25	Apollon Pontus	1–1	Ergotelis	Kalamaria, Thessaloniki, Greece
15:30 EET	Kalogeris (yellow card) 12'; Amarantidis (yellow card) 15'; Chasomeris 17'; Samaras (yellow card) 48'; Tseberidis (yellow card) 53'; López (yellow card) 88'	Report	Batzios (yellow card) 39'; Stamatakos (yellow card) 67'; Cuypers 82'	Stadium: Kalamaria Stadium; Referee: Ananias Fotiadis (Serres)

15 April 2018 26	Ergotelis	3–1	Apollon Larissa	Heraklion, Crete, Greece
17:00 EET	Nikolakakis (yellow card) 27'; Bourselis (yellow card) 58'; Cuypers 58'; Stamatakos 61', (yellow card) 70'; Patas 64'; Batzios (yellow card) 64'; Bruce (yellow card) 88'	Report	Andreou (yellow card) 40'; Tsiloulis 49', (red card) 74'; Agrodimos (yellow card) 55'; Kourtesiotis (yellow card) 77'; Chatzis (yellow card) 82'	Stadium: Pankritio Stadium; Referee: Petros Tsagkarakis (Chania)

22 April 2018 27	Ergotelis	4–1	A.E. Karaiskakis	Heraklion, Crete, Greece
17:00 EET	Cuypers 38' (pen.), 68'; Stamatakos 67', (yellow card) 88'; Boutsakis (yellow card) 81'; Patas (yellow card) 86'; Iatroudis 87'; Batzios (yellow card) 89'; Nikolakakis (yellow card) 90'; Katsimitros (yellow card) 90+1'; Stamopoulos (yellow card) 90+1'; Bruce (yellow card) 90+2'	Report	Tsontakis (yellow card) 37'; Rangelov (yellow card) 60'; Acka (yellow card) 61'; Loukinas 92' (pen.)	Stadium: Pankritio Stadium; Referee: Michael Antipariotis (East Attica)

– 28^{1}	Acharnaikos	0–3 (w/o)	Ergotelis	–
–				Stadium: – Attendance: – Referee: –

– 29^{2}	Ergotelis	3–0 (w/o)	Veria	–
–				Stadium: – Attendance: – Referee: –

4 May 2018 30	Sparti	2–2	Ergotelis	Sparta, Laconia, Greece
16:00 EET	Furtado 4'; Niaros (yellow card) 11'; Ciofu (red card) 41'; Panagiotou (yellow card) 47'; Warden 80'	Report	Cuypers (red card) 14'; Bourselis 19' (pen.); Efford 61'; Mazoulouxis (yellow card) 71'	Stadium: Sparta Municipal Stadium; Referee: Gerogios Michailidis (Boeotia)

12 May 2018 31	Ergotelis	0–3	Panserraikos	Heraklion, Crete, Greece
17:00 EET	Boutsakis (yellow card) 60'	Report	N'Nomo (yellow card) 14', (goal) 70'; Nazim 32'; Doumtsios 49'; Antman (yellow card) 87'	Stadium: Pankritio Stadium; Referee: Konstantinos Panytsidis (Kozani)

16 May 2018 32	Anagennisi Karditsa	2–1	Ergotelis	Karditsa, Greece
17:00 EET	Sountoura 7'; Plavoukos 18'; Vatousiadis (red card) 87'; Kariqi (yellow card) 90'	Report	Tselios (yellow card) 38', (goal) 53'; Bouzas (yellow card) 43'; Nikolakakis (yellow card) 90+6'	Stadium: Karditsa Municipal Stadium; Referee: Vasilios Fotias (Pella)

20 May 2018 33	Ergotelis	5–1	Aiginiakos	Heraklion, Crete, Greece
17:00 EET	Cuypers 2', 70'; Stamatakos (yellow card) 44', (goal) 90'; Tselios 75'; Iatroudis 77'	Report	Tsolakidis (yellow card) 36'; Perić 45+2', (yellow card) 65'; Andrikopoulos (yellow card) 49'	Stadium: Pankritio Stadium; Referee: Georgios Lambrou (Euboea)

25 May 2018 34	Trikala	0–3	Ergotelis	Trikala, Greece
17:00 EET	Tsiaras (red card) 55'; Katsantonis (yellow card) 43'	Report	Bouzas (yellow card) 41'; Efford 52'; Iatroudis 57'; Stamatakos 76'	Stadium: Trikala Municipal Stadium; Referee: Konstantinos Sidiropoulos (Pella)

1. Matchdays 11 and 28 vs. Acharnaikos were awarded to Ergotelis (3−0), due to Acharnaikos being expelled from the league.

2. Matchday 29 vs. Veria was awarded to Ergotelis (3−0), due to Veria having withdrawn from the league.

== Greek Cup ==
=== Group stage ===
==== Group F ====
Pos	Team	Pld	W	D	L	GF	GA	GD	Pts	Qualification	XAN	PNE	PNS	ERG
1	Xanthi	3	3	0	0	8	3	+5	9	Round of 16		2–0	—	—
2	Panetolikos	3	2	0	1	7	2	+5	6	Round of 16	—		2–0	—
3	Panserraikos	3	1	0	2	3	4	−1	3		1–2	—		2–0
4	Ergotelis	3	0	0	3	2	11	−9	0		2–4	0–5	—	

Source: epo.gr
Rules for classification: 1) points, 2) head-to-head points, 3) head-to-head goal difference, 4) head-to-head best offense, 5) overall goal difference, 6) overall best offense, 7) overall best defense

==== Matches ====
Win Draw Loss

19 September 2017 1	Panserraikos	2–0	Ergotelis	Serres, Greece
16:00 EET	Pozoglou 38', (yellow card) 90+3'; Stević (yellow card) 44'; Gkourtsas 48' (pen.); Tsimikas (yellow card) 56' (yellow-red card) 80'	Report	Stamatakos (yellow card) 30'; Patas (red card) 36'; Ladas (yellow card) 48'; Bourselis (yellow card) 78'	Stadium: Serres Municipal Stadium; Referee: Stathis Gortsilas (Macedonia)

25 October 2017 2	Ergotelis	2–4	Xanthi	Heraklion, Crete, Greece
15:00 EET	Mazoulouxis (yellow card) 45'; Efford 50'; Rovithis 58' (pen.)	Report	Triadis 20', 26', (yellow card) 31'; Sylla (yellow card) 38'; Garavelis (yellow card) 58'; Kike 64'; Roce (yellow card) 66'; Svarnas (yellow card) 76'; Jendrišek 81'	Stadium: Pankritio Stadium; Referee: Petros Tsagarakis (Chania)

30 November 2017 3	Ergotelis	0–5	Panetolikos	Heraklion, Crete, Greece
15:00 EET	Mazoulouxis (yellow card) 33'	Report	Paulo 39'; Rosa 64'; Clésio 66', 89'; Mazurek 74'	Stadium: Pankritio Stadium; Referee: Alexandros Tsamouris (Piraeus)

== Statistics ==
=== Squad statistics ===
As of 25 May 2018

Appearances denote players in the starting lineup, with the numbers in parentheses denoting appearances as substitute.

No.	Name	Football League		Greek Cup		Total	
No.	Name	Apps	Goals	Apps	Goals	Apps	Goals
Goalkeepers
18	(Greece) Georgios Chaniotakis	0	0	1	0	1	0
33	(Greece) Panagiotis Ladas	17	0	1	0	18	0
97	(Greece) Dimitrios Katsimitros	14 (1)	0	1	0	15 (1)	0
Defenders
2	(Greece) Kyriakos Mazoulouxis	18 (3)	0	2 (1)	0	20 (4)	0
3	(Greece) Apostolos Doulgerakis	0	0	1	0	1	0
4	(Greece) Konstantinos Kyriakidis	0	0	0 (1)	0	0 (1)	0
5	(Greece) Christos Batzios	29	0	2	0	31	0
11	(Canada) James Stamopoulos	30	1	2 (1)	0	32 (1)	1
12	(Greece) Stelios Labakis	0 (1)	0	2	0	2 (1)	0
13	(Greece) Manolis Nikolakakis	20 (1)	0	0	0	20 (1)	0
22	(Greece) Nikolaos Patas	14 (3)	1	1	0	15 (3)	1
31	(Greece) Konstantinos Ikonomou	3 (1)	0	0	0	3 (1)	0
99	(Greece) Athanasios Kyrialanis	0	0	1	0	1	0
Midfielders
6	(Greece) Vasilios Vogiatzis	13 (5)	0	3	0	16 (5)	0
8	(Greece) Antonis Bourselis	24 (2)	2	2	0	26 (2)	2
15	(Ghana) Albert Bruce	0 (2)	0	0	0	0 (2)	0
16	(Greece) Vasilis Bouzas	21 (2)	0	1 (1)	0	22 (3)	0
20	(Greece) Giannis Iatroudis	3 (19)	3	2 (1)	0	5 (20)	3
21	(Albania) Zani Kurti	0 (4)	0	0	0	0 (4)	0
23	(Greece) Giannis Boutsakis	28 (1)	0	2	0	30 (1)	0
38	(Greece) Ilias Tselios	18	2	0	0	18	2
70	(Greece) Georgios Angelopoulos	3 (14)	1	2	0	5 (14)	1
Forwards
7	(Greece) Georgios Manousakis	1 (8)	0	1	0	2 (8)	0
9	(United States) Joseph Efford	20 (4)	7	1 (1)	1	21 (5)	8
10	(Greece) Nikolaos Stamatakos	27 (3)	7	1 (1)	0	28 (4)	7
14	(Greece) Manolis Rovithis	4 (7)	0	1 (1)	1	5 (8)	1
19	(Belgium) Hugo Cuypers	28	22	1 (1)	0	29 (1)	22
Players transferred/loaned out during the season
17	(Greece) Georgios Lydakis	0 (1)	0	1	0	1 (1)	0
88	(Senegal) Ibrahima Ndiaye	6 (4)	1	1	0	7 (4)	1

=== Goal scorers ===
Player has departed in mid-season

No.	Pos.	Nation	Name	Greek Football League	Greek Cup	Total
19	FW	(Belgium)	Hugo Cuypers	22	0	22
9	FW	(United States)	Joseph Efford	7	1	8
10	FW	(Greece)	Nikolaos Stamatakos	7	0	7
20	MF	(Greece)	Giannis Iatroudis	3	0	3
8	MF	(Greece)	Antonis Bourselis	2	0	2
38	MF	(Greece)	Ilias Tselios	2	0	2
88	FW	(Senegal)	Ibrahima Ndiaye	1	0	1
11	DF	(Canada) (Greece)	James Stamopoulos	1	0	1
70	MF	(Greece)	Georgios Angelopoulos	1	0	1
22	DF	(Greece)	Nikolaos Patas	1	0	1
14	FW	(Greece)	Manolis Rovithis	0	1	1
-	-	-	Awarded (w/o)	9	0	9
TOTAL				56	2	58

Last updated: 25 May 2018
Source: Competitive matches

=== Disciplinary record ===
S	P	N	Name	Football League			Cup			Total		
S	P	N	Name	Yellow card	Yellow-red card	Red card	Yellow card	Yellow-red card	Red card	Yellow card	Yellow-red card	Red card
10	FW	(Greece)	Nikolaos Stamatakos	5	0	1	1	0	0	6	0	1
33	GK	(Greece)	Panagiotis Ladas	1	0	1	1	0	0	2	0	1
6	MF	(Greece)	Vasilios Vogiatzis	1	0	1	0	0	0	1	0	1
19	FW	(Belgium)	Hugo Cuypers	1	0	1	0	0	0	1	0	1
22	DF	(Greece)	Nikolaos Patas	1	0	0	0	0	1	1	0	1
5	DF	(Greece)	Christos Batzios	10	0	0	0	0	0	10	0	0
11	DF	(Canada) (Greece)	James Stamopoulos	7	0	0	0	0	0	7	0	0
16	MF	(Greece)	Vasilis Bouzas	7	0	0	0	0	0	7	0	0
23	MF	(Greece)	Giannis Boutsakis	5	0	0	0	0	0	5	0	0
13	DF	(Greece)	Manolis Nikolakakis	5	0	0	0	0	0	5	0	0
8	MF	(Greece)	Antonis Bourselis	4	0	0	1	0	0	5	0	0
2	DF	(Greece)	Kyriakos Mazoulouxis	3	0	0	2	0	0	5	0	0
88	FW	(Senegal)	Ibrahima Ndiaye	3	0	0	0	0	0	3	0	0
38	MF	(Greece)	Ilias Tselios	3	0	0	0	0	0	3	0	0
20	MF	(Greece)	Giannis Iatroudis	2	0	0	0	0	0	2	0	0
70	ΜF	(Greece)	Georgios Angelopoulos	2	0	0	0	0	0	2	0	0
9	FW	(United States)	Joseph Efford	2	0	0	0	0	0	2	0	0
15	MF	(Ghana)	Albert Bruce	2	0	0	0	0	0	2	0	0
97	GK	(Greece)	Dimitrios Katsimitros	1	0	0	0	0	0	1	0	0
TOTALS				65	0	4	5	0	1	70	0	5

Last updated: 25 May 2018
Source: Competitive matches
Ordered by (red card) , (yellow card) (yellow-red card) and (yellow card)
(yellow card) = Number of bookings; (yellow card) (yellow-red card) = Number of sending offs after a second yellow card; (red card) = Number of sending offs by a direct red card.

=== Injury record ===
N	P	Nat.	Name	Type	Status	Source	Match	Inj. Date	Ret. Date
4	DF	(Greece)	Konstantinos Kyriakidis	Knee injury (right leg)		Ergotelis.gr	vs Ermis Zoniana	24 September 2017	22 November 2017
12	DF	(Greece)	Stelios Labakis	ACL rupture		Ergotelis.gr	vs Xanthi	25 October 2017	23 May 2018
14	FW	(Greece)	Manolis Rovithis	Partial ACL rupture		Ergotelis.gr	vs Kallithea	29 October 2017	17 December 2017
8	MF	(Greece)	Antonis Bourselis	Femoral bicep rupture (right leg)		Ergotelis.gr	vs Panetolikos	30 November 2017	30 December 2017
14	FW	(Greece)	Manolis Rovithis	ACL rupture		Ergotelis.gr	vs Aris	12 March 2018	September 2018
11	DF	(Canada)	James Stamopoulos	Hematoma (right leg)		Ergotelis.gr	vs Aiginiakos	20 May 2018	TBD

- Player is injured
- Player has recovered from injury
Last updated: 24 May 2018
Source: Ergotelis FC
