= Fotis Pantekidis =

Greek footballer

Personal information
- Full name: Fotios Pantekidis
- Date of birth: 2 April 1997 (age 29)
- Place of birth: Ptolemaida, Greece
- Height: 1.80 m (5 ft 11 in)
- Position: Left-back

Team information
- Current team: Nestos Chrysoupoli
- Number: 30

Youth career
- 2013–2016: PAOK

Senior career*
Years	Team	Apps	(Gls)
2016–2018	PAOK	0	(0)
2016–2017	→ Aiginiakos (loan)	6	(0)
2017	→ Makedonikos (loan)	0	(0)
2018	→ Langadas (loan)	0	(0)
2018–2019	Anagennisi Giannitsa	25	(5)
2019–2020	Triglia	3	(0)
2020–2021	Kavala	15	(2)
2021–2022	Chania	19	(0)
2022	Panserraikos	18	(1)
2023–2024	PAOK B	28	(1)
2024–2025	Makedonikos	15	(0)
2025	Iraklis	4	(0)
2025–2026	Kampaniakos	19	(0)
2026–	Nestos Chrysoupoli	0	(0)

International career^{‡}
2013–2014	Greece U17	4	(0)
2015	Greece U18	2	(0)
- * Club domestic league appearances and goals as of 2 April 2026 ‡ National team caps and goals as of 4 February 2017

Fotis Pantekidis (Greek: Φώτης Παντεκίδης, born 2 April 1997) is a Greek professional footballer who plays as a left-back for Super League 2 club Nestos Chrysoupoli.
