= Katsimitros =

Katsimitros is a surname. Notable people with the surname include:

- Charalambos Katsimitros
- Dimitrios Katsimitros
