= Dimitrios Katsimitros =

Greek footballer

Personal information
- Date of birth: 12 June 1997 (age 29)
- Place of birth: Volos, Greece
- Height: 1.87 m (6 ft 2 in)
- Position: Goalkeeper

Team information
- Current team: PAEEK
- Number: 1

Youth career
- 2005–2008: Atromitos Schimatari
- 2008–2016: Olympiacos

Senior career*
Years	Team	Apps	(Gls)
2015–2016	Olympiacos	0	(0)
2016–2017	Anorthosis	0	(0)
2017–2021	Ergotelis	72	(0)
2021–2023	Chania	18	(0)
2023–2024	Egaleo	14	(0)
2024–2025	Nea Artaki		
2025–	PAEEK	13	(0)

International career
2013	Greece U17	5	(0)
2015	Greece U18	2	(0)
2015	Greece U19	2	(0)
- * Club domestic league appearances and goals as of 15 June 2023

Dimitrios Katsimitros (Greek: Δημήτριος Κατσιμήτρος; born 12 June 1997) is a Greek professional footballer who last played as a goalkeeper.

== Career ==
Katsimitros began his football career at the infrastructure segments of Olympiacos, featuring in the 2015–16 UEFA Youth League, where he played in two matches vs. Bayern Munich and Arsenal during the competition group stage, managing to keep a clean sheet in both occasions. In the summer of 2016 he signed a contract with Cypriot First Division club Anorthosis, without however making an appearance for the club during a one-year stay. As such, in September 2017 he returned to Greece and signed a contract with Second Division club Ergotelis.

During the first half of the 2017–18 season, Katsimitros was intended as a back-up goalkeeper behind teammate Panagiotis Ladas, but eventually earned a spot in the starting lineup for the remainder of the season, after saving a penalty and keeping a clean sheet during a match against Kallithea, coming in as a substitute for Ladas, who was sent-off for tackling an opponent inside the penalty area.

Katsimitros again fought for a place in Ergotelis' starting lineup the following season, after the arrival of more experienced goalkeeper Manolis Kalogerakis, but eventually came out on top yet again. On 24 January 2019, Katsimitros almost single-handedly earned his club a historic promotion to the 2018–19 Greek Cup quarterfinals, after saving three penalties in the second leg of the Round of 16 match-up vs. fellow Cretan Super League rival OFI (one of the total three awarded to OFI during the match, and two more during the eventual penalty shoot-out).

In 2023, Katsimitros joined AO Egaleo to play for the first team.

== Career statistics ==
As of matches played May 19, 2021

Club	Season	League			Cup		Continental		Other		Total	
Club	Season	Division	Apps	Goals	Apps	Goals	Apps	Goals	Apps	Goals	Apps	Goals
Ergotelis	2017–18	Football League	15	0	1	0	—		—		16	0
Ergotelis	2018–19	Football League	19	0	4	0	—		—		23	0
Ergotelis	2019–20	Super League 2	11	0	0	0	—		—		11	0
Ergotelis	2020–21	Super League 2	27	0	—		—		—		27	0
Total			72	0	5	0	—		—		77	0
Career total			72	0	5	0	—		—		77	0
