= Souliotis =

Souliotis (Greek: Σουλιώτης) is a Greek surname. Notable people with the surname include:

- Dimitrios Souliotis (born 1995), Greek footballer
- Elena Souliotis (1943–2004), Greek operatic soprano
- Mallory Souliotis (born 1996), American retired ice hockey player

== See also ==
- Stella Soulioti (1920–2012), Cypriot attorney and politician
- Souliotes, a former Orthodox Christian Albanian tribal community
