= Venizelos Pentarakis =

Greek footballer

Personal information
- Full name: Venizelos Stefanos Pentarakis
- Date of birth: 15 July 2000 (age 26)
- Place of birth: Chania, Crete, Greece
- Height: 1.94 m (6 ft 4 in)
- Position: Goalkeeper

Team information
- Current team: Chania
- Number: 22

Youth career
- Platanias

Senior career*
Years	Team	Apps	(Gls)
2018–2021	Platanias	2	(0)
2021–2022	Lamia	0	(0)
2022–	Chania	0	(0)
2023	→ Apollon Pontus (loan)	2	(0)
- * Club domestic league appearances and goals as of 15 June 2023

Venizelos Pentarakis (Greek: Βενιζέλος Πενταράκης; born 15 July 2000) is a Greek professional footballer. He plays as a goalkeeper for Super League 2 club Chania.
