= Michalis Agrimakis =

Greek footballer

Personal information
- Full name: Michail Agrimakis
- Date of birth: 29 July 1992 (age 34)
- Place of birth: Rethymno, Crete, Greece
- Height: 1.87 m (6 ft 2 in)
- Position: Goalkeeper

Team information
- Current team: Asteras Magoula

Youth career
- Olympiacos

Senior career*
| Years | Team | Apps | (Gls) |
| 2009–2012 | Asteras Magoula | | |
| 2012–2015 | OFI | 12 | (0) |
| 2015–2016 | Kissamikos | 4 | (0) |
| 2016–2017 | Panelefsiniakos | 3 | (0) |
| 2017–2019 | PAEEK | 50 | (0) |
| 2019–2020 | Digenis Akritas Morphou | 17 | (0) |
| 2020–2021 | Olympiakos Nicosia | 2 | (0) |
| 2021–2022 | Trikala | 8 | (0) |
| 2022–2023 | Kifisia | 2 | (0) |
| 2023–2024 | Ionikos | 3 | (0) |
| 2024 | Doxa Katokopias | 3 | (0) |
| 2025 | Schaffhausen | 0 | (0) |
| 2025 | Schaffhausen II | 3 | (0) |
| 2025–2026 | Chania | 2 | (0) |
| 2026– | Asteras Magoula | | |
- * Club domestic league appearances and goals as of 16 November 2025

Michalis Agrimakis (Greek: Μιχάλης Αγριμάκης; born 29 July 1992) is a Greek professional footballer who plays as a goalkeeper for Gamma Ethniki club Asteras Magoula.
