= Anastasios Sapountzis =

Greek footballer (born 2002)

Personal information
- Date of birth: 28 January 2002 (age 24)
- Place of birth: Edessa, Greece
- Height: 1.79 m (5 ft 10 in)
- Position: Midfielder

Team information
- Current team: Nestos Chrysoupoli
- Number: 10

Youth career
- 2013–2019: PAOK
- 2019–2021: Olympiacos

Senior career*
Years	Team	Apps	(Gls)
2021–2024	Olympiacos B	47	(6)
2022–2024	Olympiacos	0	(0)
2024–2025	Panserraikos	0	(0)
2024	→ Diagoras (loan)	3	(0)
2025	→ Kavala (loan)	9	(0)
2025–	Nestos Chrysoupoli	23	(5)

International career^{‡}
2022–2023	Greece U21	2	(0)
- * Club domestic league appearances and goals as of 20 April 2026 ‡ National team caps and goals as of 24 March 2023

Anastasios Sapountzis (Greek: Αναστάσιος Σαπουντζής; born 28 January 2002) is a Greek professional footballer who plays as a midfielder for Super League 2 club Nestos Chrysoupoli.

== Personal life ==
Sapountzis is the son of Antonis Sapountzis.
