= Filippos Dimitriadis =

Greek footballer (born 2002)

Personal information
- Date of birth: 13 August 2002 (age 24)
- Place of birth: Xanthi, Greece
- Height: 1.82 m (6 ft 0 in)
- Position: Left-back

Team information
- Current team: Nestos Chrysoupoli
- Number: 31

Youth career
- Xanthi

Senior career*
Years	Team	Apps	(Gls)
2019–2020	Iraklis Zygos		
2020–2021	Elpis Sapon		
2021–2022	Xanthi	8	(0)
2022–2023	Panathinaikos B	5	(0)
2023–2025	Kavala	52	(5)
2025–2026	Panserraikos	0	(0)
2025–2026	→ Niki Volos (loan)	1	(0)
2026–	Nestos Chrysoupoli	10	(0)
- * Club domestic league appearances and goals as of 26 April 2026

Filippos Dimitriadis (Greek: Φίλιππος Δημητριάδης; born 13 August 2002) is a Greek professional footballer who plays as a left-back for Super League 2 club Nestos Chrysoupoli.
