= Titos Koutentakis =

Greek footballer (born 2003)

Personal information
- Date of birth: 22 August 2003 (age 23)
- Place of birth: Heraklion, Crete, Greece
- Height: 1.69 m (5 ft 7 in)
- Position: Midfielder

Team information
- Current team: Chania
- Number: 8

Youth career
- 2015–2018: OFI
- 2018–2022: PAOK

Senior career*
Years	Team	Apps	(Gls)
2022–2023	PAOK B	2	(0)
2023	→ Makedonikos (loan)	3	(0)
2023–2025	OFI	4	(0)
2025–	Chania	13	(1)

International career^{‡}
2019–2020	Greece U17	5	(0)
2021	Greece U19	3	(0)
2022–2023	Greece U21	2	(0)
- * Club domestic league appearances and goals as of 21 December 2025 ‡ National team caps and goals as of 24 March 2023

Titos Koutentakis (Greek: Τίτος Κουτεντάκης; born 22 August 2003) is a Greek professional footballer who plays as a midfielder for Super League 2 club Chania.
