= Georgios Maidanos =

Greek footballer

Personal information
- Date of birth: 12 April 1998 (age 28)
- Place of birth: Chrysoupoli, Greece
- Height: 1.70 m (5 ft 7 in)
- Position: Left-back

Team information
- Current team: Nestos Chrysoupoli
- Number: 23

Youth career
- Ethnikos Neas Karyas

Senior career*
Years	Team	Apps	(Gls)
2017–2019	Nestos Chrysoupoli	44	(0)
2019–2020	Kavala	20	(1)
2020–2024	AEL	62	(0)
2024–2026	Ilioupoli	52	(0)
2026–	Nestos Chrysoupoli	0	(0)
- * Club domestic league appearances and goals as of 25 April 2026

Georgios Maidanos (Greek: Γεώργιος Μαϊδανός; born 12 April 1998) is a Greek professional footballer who plays as a left-back for Super League 2 club Nestos Chrysoupoli.
