= Geron Tocka =

Albanian footballer

Personal information
- Date of birth: 16 August 1999 (age 27)
- Place of birth: Thessaloniki, Greece
- Height: 1.78 m (5 ft 10 in)
- Position: Attacking midfielder

Team information
- Current team: Nestos Chrysoupoli
- Number: 12

Youth career
- Iraklis

Senior career*
Years	Team	Apps	(Gls)
2017–2020	PO Neas Kallikratias		
2020	FK Dukla Banská Bystrica	6	(0)
2020–2021	Triglia	17	(1)
2021–2023	Iraklis	44	(3)
2023–2024	Kampaniakos	31	(5)
2024–2026	Olympiakos Nicosia	40	(2)
2026–	Nestos Chrysoupoli	0	(0)
- * Club domestic league appearances and goals as of 14 June 2026

Geron Tocka (born 16 August 1999) is an Albanian professional footballer who played as an attacking midfielder for Super League Greece 2 club Nestos Chrysoupoli.
