= Enea Gaqollari =

Albanian footballer

Personal information
- Full name: Lazaros Enea Gaqollari
- Date of birth: 14 December 1992 (age 33)
- Place of birth: Elbasan, Albania
- Height: 1.80 m (5 ft 11 in)
- Position: Midfielder

Team information
- Current team: Aspropyrgos
- Number: 88

Youth career
- 2009–2011: Xanthi

Senior career*
Years	Team	Apps	(Gls)
2011–2014	Xanthi	1	(0)
2013	→ Aiginiakos (loan)	2	(0)
2014	→ Nestos Chrysoupoli (loan)	10	(0)
2014–2016	Nestos Chrysoupoli		
2016–2018	Aiginiakos	58	(5)
2018–2019	Trikala	5	(0)
2019	Platanias	7	(0)
2019–	Aspropyrgos	23	(1)
- * Club domestic league appearances and goals as of 23:40, 12 August 2020 (UTC)

Enea Gaqollari (born 14 December 1992) is an Albanian professional footballer who plays as a midfielder for Greek Football League club Aspropyrgos.
