= Vicu Bulmaga =

Moldovan footballer

- Bulmaga with Moldova U21 in 2023

Personal information
- Date of birth: 5 July 2003 (age 23)
- Place of birth: Telenești, Moldova
- Height: 1.77 m (5 ft 10 in)
- Positions: Defender; midfielder

Team information
- Current team: Chania
- Number: 22

Youth career
- Dacia Buiucani

Senior career*
Years	Team	Apps	(Gls)
2020–2021	Dacia Buiucani	29	(0)
2021–2022	Teplice	2	(0)
2021–2022	→ Teplice B	32	(6)
2023–2025	Isloch Minsk Raion	70	(4)
2026–	Chania	2	(0)

International career^{‡}
2018–2019	Moldova U17	4	(0)
2021	Moldova U19	3	(0)
2020–2024	Moldova U21	16	(0)
- * Club domestic league appearances and goals as of 21 April 2026 ‡ National team caps and goals as of 11 October 2024

Vicu Bulmaga (born 5 July 2003) is a Moldovan professional footballer who plays as a defender for Super League Greece 2 club Chania.

== Club career ==
Bulmaga started his career in his native Moldova with Dacia Buiucani before a move to Czech side Teplice in 2021. He started well for the club's 'B' team, scoring a number of goals. He marked his second appearance in the Czech First League with an own goal in a 2–0 loss to Pardubice.

== Career statistics ==
=== Club ===
As of 15 May 2022.

Club	Season	League			Cup		Other		Total	
Club	Season	Division	Apps	Goals	Apps	Goals	Apps	Goals	Apps	Goals
Dacia Buiucani	2020–21	Divizia Națională	29	0	0	0	0	0	29	0
Teplice B	2021–22	ČFL	17	5	–		0	0	17	5
Teplice	2021–22	Fortuna liga	2	0	2 (Note: Appearances in the Czech Cup)	0	0	0	4	0
Career total			48	5	2	0	0	0	50	5
