= Nikolaos Stamatakos =

Greek footballer (born 1992)

Nikos Stamatakos
Personal information
- Full name: Nikolaos Stamatakos
- Date of birth: 1 January 1992 (age 34)
- Place of birth: Eretria, Greece
- Height: 1.69 m (5 ft 6 1/2 in)
- Position: Winger

Youth career
- –2009: Apollon Eretria

Senior career*
Years	Team	Apps	(Gls)
2009–2010	Apollon Eretria		
2010–2011	Chalkida	26	(1)
2011–2014	Apollon Eretria		
2014–2017	Kallithea	35	(7)
2015–2016	→ Chalkida (loan)	23	(11)
2017–2018	Ergotelis	30	(7)
2018–2019	Trikala	9	(1)
2019	Ethnikos Piraeus		
2019–2021	Iraklis Psachna		
2021	Nea Artaki		
2022	Apollon Eretria		
- * Club domestic league appearances and goals as of 11 January 2019

Nikolaos "Nikos" Stamatakos (Greek: Νικόλαος "Νίκος" Σταματάκος; born 1 January 1992) is a Greek professional footballer who plays as a forward.

== Career ==
=== Early years ===
Stamatakos began his football career in Eretria Academy. He played for his hometown club Apollon Eretria in the Euboea Football Clubs Association A1 Division during the 2009−10 season, achieving top-scorer honors. He then moved to AO Chalkida in 2010, at the time playing in the Delta Ethniki, the fourth tier of the Greek football league system. Aged 19, Stamatakos played a total of 1328 minutes in which he scored 1 goal and had 1 assist. He returned to Apollon in 2011, where he played for three seasons in local competitions, each finishing as his club's top-scorer. His feats drew the attention of Greek second Division side Kallithea, who signed him in 2014.

=== Senior career ===
Stamatakos made 4 league appearances for Kallithea during the 2014−15 season. He was given on loan to Gamma Ethniki side AO Chalkida in 2015, returning to the Euboea-based club after 4 years in order to get more playing time. Stamatakos excelled during the 2015–16 Gamma Ethniki, scoring 11 goals in 23 league appearances and another 6 in the Euboea FCA Cup, once again earning club season top-scorer honors. He returned to Kallithea for the 2016−17 season. He scored two goals vs. eventual Division champions Apollon Smyrnis during the 2016–17 season opener, a thrilling 3−2 away loss. He followed up with another goal during an impressive 1−0 Kallithea victory over Super League side Atromitos in the 2016–17 Greek Football Cup. In total, Stamatakos played in 31 league games and scored 6 goals for Kallithea, making a significant contribution to his club's narrow escape of relegation, and which once again made him club season top-scorer.

In August 2017, Stamatakos terminated his contract with Kallithea. A few weeks later, he signed a contract with fellow Football League side Ergotelis, rejoining his former coach at Kallithea, Takis Gonias. He scored his first goal for Ergotelis in November 2017, during a 2−3 home loss vs. title contenders Aris. He had a significant contribution to his club's offensive game, leading his team in assists (10), and having scored 7 times in 30 league appearances.

In the summer of 2018, Stamatakos left Ergotelis to join fellow Football League side Trikala.

== Club statistics ==
As of 11 January 2019

Club	Season	League			Cup		Other		Total	
Club	Season	Division	Apps	Goals	Apps	Goals	Apps	Goals	Apps	Goals
Kallithea	2014–15	Football League	4	0	1	0	—		5	0
Kallithea	2016–17	Football League	31	6	3	1	—		34	7
Kallithea	Total		35	6	4	1	0	0	39	7
AO Chalkida (loan)	2015–16	Gamma Ethniki	23	11	0	0	—		23	11
Ergotelis	2017–18	Football League	30	7	2	0	—		32	7
Trikala	2018–19	Football League	9	1	3	0	—		12	1
Career total			97	25	9	1	0	0	106	26
