= Lefteris Astras =

Greek professional footballer

Personal information
- Full name: Eleftherios Astras
- Date of birth: 14 February 1997 (age 29)
- Place of birth: Athens, Greece
- Height: 1.88 m (6 ft 2 in)
- Position: Goalkeeper

Team information
- Current team: Nestos Chrysoupoli
- Number: 14

Youth career
- Panionios

Senior career*
Years	Team	Apps	(Gls)
2015–2018	Panionios	2	(0)
2018–2019	Apollon Smyrnis	4	(0)
2019–2020	San Fernando	1	(0)
2020–2022	Apollon Larissa	40	(0)
2022–2023	Proodeftiki	20	(0)
2023–2025	Kavala	28	(0)
2025–	Nestos Chrysoupoli	19	(0)

International career^{‡}
2015	Greece U18	1	(0)
2015	Greece U19	7	(0)
2017–2018	Greece U21	3	(0)
- * Club domestic league appearances and goals as of 20 April 2026 ‡ National team caps and goals as of 11 January 2019

Lefteris Astras (Greek: Λευτέρης Αστράς; born 14 February 1997) is a Greek professional footballer who plays as a goalkeeper for Super League 2 club Nestos Chrysoupoli.

== Career statistics ==
=== Club ===
As of match played 3 June 2025

Appearances and goals by club, season and competition
Club	Season	League			National cup (Note: Includes Greek Cup, Copa Federación de España)		Continental		Other		Total	
Club	Season	Division	Apps	Goals	Apps	Goals	Apps	Goals	Apps	Goals	Apps	Goals
Panionios	2017-18	Super League Greece	2	0	–		–		–		2	0
Apollon Smyrnis	2018-19	Super League Greece	4	0	1	0	–		–		5	0
San Fernando	2019-20	Segunda División B	1	0	2	0	–		–		3	0
Apollon Larissa	2020-21	Super League Greece 2	16	0	–		–		–		16	0
Apollon Larissa	2021-22	Super League Greece 2	24	0	1	0	–		–		25	0
Apollon Larissa	Total		40	0	1	0	–		–		40	1
Proodeftiki	2022-23	Super League Greece 2	19	0	1	0	–		–		20	0
Kavala	2024-25	Super League Greece 2	26	0	2	0	–		–		28	0
career Total			92	0	7	0	–		–		99	0
