= Angelos Karatasios =

Greek footballer (born in 1997)

Personal information
- Full name: Angelos Karatasios
- Date of birth: 22 June 1997 (age 29)
- Place of birth: Katerini, Greece
- Height: 1.86 m (6 ft 1 in)
- Position: Centre back

Team information
- Current team: Ermis Exochi

Youth career
- –2013: Vataniakos

Senior career*
| Years | Team | Apps | (Gls) |
| 2013–2014 | Vataniakos | 2 | (0) |
| 2014–2015 | Pierikos | 8 | (0) |
| 2015 | Niki Volos | 0 | (0) |
| 2015-2016 | Tyrnavos | 25 | (1) |
| 2016–2018 | AEL | 2 | (0) |
| 2018 | Olympiacos | 0 | (0) |
| 2018–2020 | Apollon Larissa | 35 | (0) |
| 2020–2022 | Diagoras | 32 | (1) |
| 2022–2023 | Poli Timișoara | 3 | (0) |
| 2023 | Egaleo | 5 | (0) |
| 2023–2024 | Pierikos | 15 | (2) |
| 2024–2025 | Trikala | 0 | (0) |
| 2025– | Ermis Exochi | | |
- * Club domestic league appearances and goals as of 14:55, 16 June 2023 (UTC)

Angelos Karatasios (Greek: Άγγελος Καρατάσιος, born 22 June 1997) is a Greek professional footballer who plays as a centre back for Gamma Ethniki club Ermis Exochi.
