= Nikolas Mattheou =

Cypriot footballer (born 1998)

Personal information
- Full name: Nicolas Mattheou
- Date of birth: 7 May 1998 (age 28)
- Place of birth: Limassol, Cyprus
- Height: 1.82 m (5 ft 11 1/2 in)
- Position: Winger

Team information
- Current team: AEZ Zakakiou
- Number: 23

Youth career
- 2013–2014: Apollon Limassol
- 2014–2017: PAOK

Senior career*
Years	Team	Apps	(Gls)
2016–2019	PAOK	0	(0)
2017–2018	→ Anorthosis (loan)	9	(0)
2018–2019	→ Karaiskakis (loan)	12	(1)
2019–2020	Apollon Limassol	0	(0)
2019–2020	→ Aris Limassol (loan)	19	(5)
2020–2021	Aris Limassol	3	(0)
2022–2023	Omonia 29M	23	(1)
2023–2025	Karmiotissa	34	(1)
2025-	AEZ Zakakiou	29	(3)

International career
2014	Cyprus U17	3	(1)
2016	Cyprus U19	10	(3)
2017–2019	Cyprus U21	9	(0)
Medal record
PAOK
Winner	Greek Football Cup	2016-2017
- * Club domestic league appearances and goals as of 3 May 2026

Nikolas Mattheou (Greek: Νικόλας Ματθαίου, born 7 May 1998 in Limassol) is a Cypriot professional footballer who plays as a winger for AEZ Zakakiou.

== Club career ==
Mattheou started from Apollon Limassol youth clubs, and he moved to PAOK youth clubs in 2014. On 1 June 2016, Mattheou signed a three-year contract with PAOK. He was a used substitute at the 2016–17 Greek Football Cup final. On 23 June 2017, Mattheou was loaned to Anorthosis Famagusta. On 30 September 2017 he made his debut in 1–1 draw, against AEK Larnaca. Mattheou replaced Giorgos Economides at the 88th minute, and made the assist to Demba Camara who tied the game at the 91st minute.

On 22 July 2019, Mattheou returned to his childhood club Apollon Limassol FC on a three-year contract. On 4 September, he was loaned out to Aris Limassol FC for the 2019–20 season.
