= Apollon Eretria F.C. =

Greek football club

Apollon Eretria
- Full name: Athlitikos Omilos Apollon Eretria
- Founded: 1958; 68 years ago
- Ground: Eretria Municipal Stadium, Eretria, Greece
- Chairman: Georgios Peppes
- Manager: Antonios Avlonitis
- League: Euboea FCA First Division
- 2025–26: Euboea FCA First Division, 12th
Home colours	Away colours

Apollon Eretria Football Club is a Greek football club, based in Eretria, Euboea, Greece.

== Honours ==
=== Domestic Titles and honours ===
  - Euboea FCA champion: 5
    - 1978–79, 1986–87, 1994–95, 1996–97, 2017–18
  - Euboea FCA Cup Winners: 2
    - 1986–87, 1990–91
  - Euboea FCA Super Cup Winners: 1
    - 2018
