= Dimitrios Kasotakis =

Greek footballer (born 1996)

Personal information
- Full name: Dimitrios Kasotakis
- Date of birth: 21 September 1996 (age 30)
- Place of birth: Agios Nikolaos, Crete, Greece
- Height: 1.85 m (6 ft 1 in)
- Position: Goalkeeper

Team information
- Current team: Ierapetra
- Number: 1

Youth career
- –2014: Agios Nikolaos
- 2014–2015: Platanias

Senior career*
Years	Team	Apps	(Gls)
2015–2018	Platanias	2	(0)
2018–2020	Kalamata	4	(0)
2020–2021	AO Karava		
2021–	Ierapetra	0	(0)
- * Club domestic league appearances and goals as of 20 July 2020

Dimitrios Kasotakis (Greek: Δημήτριος Κασωτάκης; born 21 September 1996) is a Greek professional footballer who plays as a goalkeeper for Super League 2 club Ierapetra.
