= Nestos Chrysoupoli F.C. =

Association football club in Greece

Nestos Chrysoupoli
- Full name: Athlitikos Syllogos Nestos Chrysoupoli
- Founded: 1930; 96 years ago
- Ground: Municipal Stadium of Chrysoupoli
- Capacity: 5,000
- Chairman: Dimitrios Psychoudakis
- Manager: Giannis Tatsis
- League: Super League Greece 2
- 2025–26: Super League Greece 2 (North Group), 6th
Home colours	Away colours	Third colours

Nestos Chrysoupoli Football Club (Greek: Α.Σ. Νέστος Χρυσούπολης) is a Greek football club based in Chrysoupoli, Kavala, Greece.

== History ==
The group was founded in 1930 and reached the peak of its subheadings in the 1970s when it took part in the championship of the Second National League.

Specifically, 1973 was champion of Eps Kavalas and then won the promotion through the special championship Hellenic Football Federation. So, he played two consecutive years (even unique in history) to B Ethniki. 1973–74 season ranked 11th in Gamma Ethniki and in 1974–75 came 14th and relegated at the local league.

During the next decade they participated in Gamma Ethniki, and had multiple instances in Delta Ethniki.

Specifically, in 1986 was champion of Delta Ethniki and promoted to Gamma Ethniki.

The club finished 14th in 1986–87 season and 18th (last) in 1987–88 season, and were relegated. They were promoted for one year in 1993–94 (18th) before returning to the second division in 2025.

== Players ==
=== Current squad ===
As of 12 September 2026

Note: Flags indicate national team as defined under FIFA eligibility rules; some limited exceptions apply. Players may hold more than one non-FIFA nationality.

No.	Pos.	Nation	Player
1	GK	ALB	Jorgo Muca
3	DF	CMR	Frédéric Miyenga
5	DF	GRE	Pavlos Dermitzakis
7	MF	ALB	Renild Kasemi
8	MF	GRE	Ozer Memetoglou
9	FW	GRE	Petros Giakoumakis
10	MF	GRE	Anastasios Sapountzis
11	MF	GRE	Vasilios Kostika
12	MF	ALB	Geron Tocka
14	GK	GRE	Lefteris Astras (captain)
17	MF	SRB	Dušan Stoiljković
18	MF	GRE	Dimitrios Thomaidis
19	MF	GRE	Konstantinos Baltas
20	MF	GRE	Antonis Trimmatis

No.	Pos.	Nation	Player
21	DF	GRE	Fotis Chavos
22	DF	GRE	Savvas Topalidis
23	DF	GRE	Georgios Maidanos
30	DF	GRE	Fotis Pantekidis
31	DF	GRE	Filippos Dimitriadis
33	DF	GRE	Eleftherios Gionis
34	DF	GRE	Odysseas Lymperakis
44	MF	SUI	Dylan Tutonda
70	MF	HAI	Mikaël Cantave
77	FW	BIH	Franko Sabljić
88	MF	GRE	Aristidis Stavropoulos
93	MF	GRE	Konstantinos Vryzas
97	FW	ARG	Franco Shea
99	FW	GRE	Antonios Dermitzakis

== Honours ==
=== Domestic ===
  - Gamma Ethniki: 1
    - 2024–25
  - Fourth Division: 2
    - 1985–86, 1992–93
  - Greek FCA Winners' Championship: 1
    - 1972–73
  - Greek Football Amateur Cup: 1
    - 2014–15
  - Amateurs' Super Cup Greece: 1
    - 2014–15
  - Kavala FCA First Division: 9
    - 1972–73, 1973–74, 1975–76, 1981–82, 2001–02, 2004–05, 2009–10, 2012–13, 2014–15
  - Kavala FCA Cup: 12
    - 1972–73, 1975–76, 1978–79, 1989–90, 1995–96, 1997–98, 1998–99, 1999–00, 2001–02, 2014–15, 2015–16, 2019–20
