= Dimitrios Kapos =

Greek footballer

Personal information
- Full name: Dimitrios Kapos
- Date of birth: 28 August 1993 (age 33)
- Place of birth: Chios, Greece
- Height: 1.83 m (6 ft 0 in)
- Position: Centre forward

Team information
- Current team: Egaleo
- Number: 9

Youth career
- –2013: APO Kanaris Nenita

Senior career*
Years	Team	Apps	(Gls)
2013–2014	Levadiakos	3	(0)
2014–2015	Opountios Martino	26	(7)
2015–2018	AEL	26	(4)
2017–2018	→ Trikala (loan)	12	(1)
2018–2019	Trikala	23	(3)
2019–2020	Niki Volos	11	(1)
2020–	Egaleo	7	(0)
- * Club domestic league appearances and goals as of 18 August 2020

Dimitrios Kapos (Greek: Δημήτριος Καπός; born 28 August 1993) is a Greek professional footballer who plays as a centre forward for Football League club Egaleo.

== Career ==
Kapos started playing in his local Chios-based amateur club Kanaris Neniton in 2012. In the season 2013–14, Kapos made a major step in his career and moved to Greek Super League club Levadiakos, although he didn't manage to play in an official league game. The next season (2014–2015) he signed with Gamma Ethniki team Opountios Martino where he had a full and productive participation with 7 goals in 26 appearances. On 15 of July 2015, he moved to AEL and signed a 3-years contract. On 29 July 2017 he extended his contract until the summer of 2020 before joining Trikala on a season-long loan. On 16 December 2017 he scored his first goal in a 1–0 away win against Karaiskakis.
