= James Stamopoulos =

Canadian professional soccer player (born 1991)

Personal information
- Full name: Dimitrios Stamopoulos
- Date of birth: 24 June 1991 (age 35)
- Place of birth: Toronto, Ontario, Canada
- Height: 1.67 m (5 ft 5 1/2 in)
- Position: Left back

Youth career
- Erin Mills SC
- −2009: Toronto FC

College career
Years	Team	Apps	(Gls)
2009−2012	Hartford Hawks	59	(7)

Senior career*
Years	Team	Apps	(Gls)
2013	Burlington SC	2	(1)
2014	Proteas Paleas Fokeas	8	(0)
2015–2017	Kallithea	52	(3)
2017–2018	Ergotelis	30	(1)
2018–2021	Panachaiki	64	(0)
2021–2024	Anagennisi Karditsa	63	(4)

International career
2007	Canada U16		
- * Club domestic league appearances and goals

Dimitrios "James" Stamopoulos (Greek: Δημήτριος "Τζέιμς" Σταμόπουλος; born 24 June 1991) is a Canadian former professional soccer player who played as a left back.

== Career ==
=== Early years ===
Born in Toronto, Ontario, Canada, to Greek parents, Stamopoulos began playing football at the age of four with Dixie FC. He played for Erin Mills Soccer Club in the Ontario Youth Soccer League, where he achieved top goal scorer honours. He won the Ontario Cup and National Club Championship in 2005. Stamopoulos attended the Port Credit Secondary School, where he was a three-year member of the varsity soccer team. He captained the high school team during his sophomore and junior seasons and was named the team's most valuable player after leading the team in scoring for three straight seasons. As a sophomore, he won the Tier 2 ROPSSAA high school league and was called up to the Canadian U-16 National Team in 2007. At the age of 17, he joined the Toronto FC Academy and played in the Canadian Soccer League. He chose to move to the United States on a scholarship and attend the University of Hartford to pursue a degree in marketing.

==== Hartford Hawks ====
During his freshman year at Hartford, Stamopoulos played in all 18 games with the Hawks, scoring one goal and leading the team in assists (4). He was named to the America East All-Rookie Team. As a sophomore, Stamopoulos missed six games due to an injury. After making his return to the line-up, Hartford rebounded from a 0-5 start to post a mark of 5-4. He played in nine games total, eight of which were as a starter, and scored three goals. As a result, he was named to the America East All-Academic Team. During his four seasons with the Hawks, Stamopoulos started in 59 of the 62 games he played in. As a four-year midfielder, he scored seven goals and delivered eight assists, while also netting three game-winning goals.

=== Senior career ===
After he received his degree from Hartford, Stamopoulos pursued a professional football career. In 2013, he returned to the Canadian Soccer League and played with Burlington SC in the league's first division. Due to his dual nationality, Stamopoulos moved to Greece, where he was tried by Second Division sides Fokikos and Kallithea. Having convinced Kallithea staff of his talent but missing the transfer window, Stamopoulos ended up signing a three-month contract with East Attica regional division club Proteas Paleas Fokeas. During the winter transfer window of 2015, Stamopoulos finally moved to Kallithea, where he stayed until the summer of 2017. He made his league debut for the club on 11 January 2015, at the Athens Olympic Stadium against the renowned Greek club AEK, coming in as a second-half substitute. He played in 52 league games, scoring three goals. After Kallithea, Stamopoulos moved to Crete, signing with fellow second-tier side Ergotelis and rejoining with former Kallithea coach Takis Gonias.

In 2018, Stamopoulos signed with Panachaiki. Throughout this time with the club, he served as the team captain. He left Panachaiki in 2021, after three years with the club. In the 2021 summer transfer market, he signed with Anagennisi Karditsa. After three seasons with Anagennisi Karditsa, he announced his retirement from professional soccer in 2024.

== Personal life ==
In 2022, Stamopoulos married his wife, Maria Apostolopoulou.

== Club statistics ==
As of 25 June 2019

Club	Season	League			Cup		Other		Total	
Club	Season	Division	Apps	Goals	Apps	Goals	Apps	Goals	Apps	Goals
Kallithea	2014–15	Football League	8	1	0	0	—		8	1
Kallithea	2015–16	Football League	15	1	1	0	—		16	1
Kallithea	2016–17	Football League	29	1	3	0	—		32	1
Kallithea	Total		52	3	4	0	0	0	56	3
Ergotelis	2017–18	Football League	30	1	3	0	—		33	1
Panachaiki	2018–19	Football League	25	0	6	0	—		31	0
Career total			107	4	13	0	0	0	120	4
