= Christos Agrodimos =

Greek footballer

Personal information
- Date of birth: 16 March 1995 (age 31)
- Place of birth: Herford, Germany
- Height: 1.76 m (5 ft 9 in)
- Position: Midfielder

Youth career
- 2012–2013: AEL

Senior career*
Years	Team	Apps	(Gls)
2013–2014	AEL	3	(0)
2013	→ Tyrnavos (loan)	3	(0)
2014–2016	Oikonomos Tsaritsani	40	(2)
2016–2018	Apollon Larissa	52	(4)
2018–2019	Panetolikos	0	(0)
2019–2020	Apollon Smyrnis	12	(0)
2020–2021	Olympiacos Volos	7	(0)
2021–2022	Iraklis Larissa	0	(0)
2022	Trikala	0	(0)
2022–2023	Oikonomos Tsaritsani	0	(0)
- * Club domestic league appearances and goals as of 22 July 2021

Christos Agrodimos (Greek: Χρήστος Αγρόδημος, born 16 March 1995) is a Greek former professional footballer.

== Career ==
He started his career with the youth system of AEL, where he remained until 2013. At the age of 18, he left the academies of the team, and agreed to move on 6-month loan spell to Tyrnavos. After his loan spell, he returned to AEL, where he remained for the 2013-14 season. With the beginning of the 2014-15 season, Agrodimos left AEL and joined local team Oikonomos Tsaritsani. After spending two seasons with Tsaritsani, he continued his career with Apollon Larissa, where he was part of the highly successful 2016-17 season, which saw the team achieve promotion to the Football League. As of 2017, Agrodimos returned to AEL. However, in August 2017 he decided to break up his contract with AEL, and returned to his former club Apollon Larissa.

On 26 June 2018. he joined Panetolikos, signing a contract until the summer of 2020.

On 18 January 2019, following his release from Panetolikos, he signed a contract with Apollon Smyrnis.
