= Lymperis Stergidis =

Greek footballer

Personal information
- Date of birth: 11 February 1987 (age 39)
- Place of birth: Thessaloniki, Greece
- Height: 1.82 m (6 ft 0 in)
- Position: Midfielder

Youth career
- –2007: Niki Polygyros

Senior career*
Years	Team	Apps	(Gls)
2007–2009	Thermaikos		
2009–2011	Panachaiki		
2011–2012	Niki Volos		
2012–2013	Giannitsa	35	(1)
2013	Kerkyra	5	(0)
2013–2014	Giannitsa	9	(2)
2014–2016	Panachaiki	45	(8)
2016	Apollon Smyrnis	14	(2)
2016–2018	Panachaiki	22	(2)
2018–2019	ASIL Lysi	10	(1)
2019	Nafpaktiakos	0	(0)
2019–2020	Kalamata	15	(1)
2020	Ionikos	2	(0)
2020–2021	Panserraikos	0	(0)
2021	Thyella Patras		
2021–2023	Panachaiki	26	(0)
2023–2024	Atromitos Patras		
- * Club domestic league appearances and goals as of 15 June 2023

Lymperis Stergidis (Greek: Λυμπέρης Στεργίδης; born 11 February 1987) is a Greek professional footballer who plays as a midfielder.
