= Panagiotis Ladas =

Greek footballer

Personal information
- Date of birth: 26 August 1994 (age 32)
- Place of birth: Pyrgos, Greece
- Height: 1.90 m (6 ft 3 in)
- Position: Goalkeeper

Team information
- Current team: Kallithea

Youth career
- –2010: Argonaftis Katakolou
- 2010–2013: Asteras Tripolis

Senior career*
Years	Team	Apps	(Gls)
2013–2014	Asteras Tripolis	0	(0)
2014–2016	Iraklis	1	(0)
2016	Doxa Nea Manolada		
2016–2017	KFC Oosterzonen	22	(0)
2017–2018	Ergotelis	17	(0)
2018–	Kallithea	0	(0)

International career
2013	Greece U19	3	(0)
- * Club domestic league appearances and goals as of 21 June 2017

Panagiotis Ladas (Greek: Παναγιώτης Λαδάς, Greek pronunciation: [pana'ʝotis la'ðas]; born 26 August 1994) is a Greek professional footballer who plays as a goalkeeper for Gamma Ethniki club Kallithea. Ladas has also represented his country internationally playing with the Greek U19 national football team.

== Club career ==
Ladas started his football with Argonaftis Katakolou. He subsequently moved to Asteras Tripolis in 2010 where he failed to make a first team appearance. On 19 August 2014 he signed for Football League club Iraklis. Ladas made his full professional debut for Iraklis in a Greek Cup match against Ethnikos Gazoros.

After a short stint with Gamma Ethniki side Doxa Nea Manolada, Ladas signed with Belgian First Amateur Division side KFC Oosterzonen in the summer of 2016. He returned to Greece and the Greek Football League a year later, signing with Cretan club Ergotelis.

== International career ==
Ladas has received three caps for Greece U19.

== Career statistics ==
As of matches played 21 January 2018

Club	Season	League			Cup		Europe		Other		Total	
Club	Season	Division	Apps	Goals	Apps	Goals	Apps	Goals	Apps	Goals	Apps	Goals
Asteras Tripolis	2013–14	Super League Greece	0	0	0	0	0	0	—		0	0
Total			0	0	0	0	0	0	—		0	0
Iraklis	2014–15	Football League Greece	0	0	1	0	—		0 (Note: Football League Play-Offs)	0	1	0
Iraklis	2015–16	Super League Greece	0	0	0	0	—		—		0	0
Total			0	0	1	0	—		0	0	1	0
Doxa Nea Manolada	2015–16	Gamma Ethniki	?	0	?	0	—		—		?	0
Total			?	0	?	0	—		—		?	0
KFC Oosterzonen	2016–17	Belgian First Amateur Division	22	0	2	0	—		—		24	0
Total			22	0	2	0	—		—		24	0
Ergotelis	2017–18	Football League	17	0	1	0	—		—		18	0
Total			17	0	1	0	—		—		18	0
Kallithea	2018–19	Gamma Ethniki	0	0	—		—		—		0	0
Total			17	0	1	0	—		—		18	0
Career total			39	0	4	0	0	0	0	0	43	0
