= Dimitrios Souliotis =

Greek footballer (born 1995)

Personal information
- Date of birth: 23 July 1995 (age 31)
- Place of birth: Larissa, Greece
- Height: 1.95 m (6 ft 5 in)
- Position: Centre-back

Team information
- Current team: Pierikos

Youth career
- –2012: Filoktitis Melivia

Senior career*
Years	Team	Apps	(Gls)
2013–2015	Tyrnavos 2005	18	(0)
2015–2017	AEL	2	(0)
2017–2018	Veria	11	(1)
2018–2020	Apollon Larissa	42	(2)
2020–2021	Trikala	25	(1)
2021–2023	Almopos Aridea	51	(5)
2023–2024	Kozani	29	(5)
2024–	Pierikos	0	(0)
- * Club domestic league appearances and goals as of 15 June 2023

Dimitrios Souliotis (Greek: Δημήτριος Σουλιώτης; born 23 July 1995) is a Greek professional footballer who plays as a centre-back for Gamma Ethniki club Pierikos.

== Career ==
Souliotis was born on July 23, 1995, in Larissa. He began his career in 2012, from the youth team of Filoktitis Melivia, and in 2013 he signed for Gamma Ethniki club Tyrnavos 2005. He competed in the second division in 18 league games. On 4 August 2015, he signed a 4-year contract with AEL.
