= Savvas Topalidis =

Greek footballer

Personal information
- Date of birth: 18 October 1997 (age 29)
- Place of birth: Katerini, Greece
- Height: 1.69 m (5 ft 6 1/2 in)
- Position: Right back

Team information
- Current team: Nestos Chrysoupoli
- Number: 22

Youth career
- –2015: PAOK

Senior career*
Years	Team	Apps	(Gls)
2015–2017	PAOK	0	(0)
2016–2017	→ Aiginiakos (loan)	14	(0)
2017–2019	Aiginiakos	48	(1)
2019	Dias Diou		
2020–2022	Pierikos	38	(0)
2022–2024	Niki Volos	45	(1)
2024–2025	Makedonikos	20	(1)
2025–2026	Chania	18	(0)
2026–	Nestos Chrysoupoli	0	(0)

International career
2015	Greece U18	2	(0)
2015	Greece U19	3	(0)
- * Club domestic league appearances and goals as of 21 April 2026

Savvas Topalidis (Greek: Σάββας Τοπαλίδης, born 18 October 1997 in Katerini, Greece) is a Greek professional footballer who plays as a right back for Super League Greece 2 club Nestos Chrysoupoli.

== Career ==
On 23 June 2016 it was announced that Topalidis signed a season long contract with Aiginiakos, on loan from PAOK.
