= Takis Gonias =

Greek football manager (1971–2026)

Personal information
- Full name: Panagiotis Gonias
- Date of birth: 6 October 1971
- Place of birth: Livadeia, Greece
- Date of death: 24 June 2026 (aged 54)
- Height: 1.81 m (5 ft 11 in)
- Position: Midfielder

Youth career
- –1987: Panathinaikos Kyriaki
- 1987–1988: Levadiakos

Senior career*
Years	Team	Apps	(Gls)
1988–1992	Levadiakos	64	(11)
1992–1996	Olympiacos	57	(0)
1996–1998	Iraklis	33	(7)
1998–1999	Sporting Gijón	10	(1)
1999–2000	Paniliakos	27	(5)
2000–2002	Panionios	42	(7)
2002–2003	Iraklis	29	(6)
2003–2004	Olympiacos	16	(1)
2004–2005	Messina	3	(0)
2005	Crotone	0	(0)
Total		281	(38)

International career
1997–1998	Greece	2	(1)

Managerial career
- 2013: Glyfada
- 2015: Episkopi
- 2016: Kallithea
- 2017−2018: Ergotelis
- 2018−2020: Wadi Degla
- 2021: Pyramids
- 2022–2023: Pyramids
- * Club domestic league appearances and goals

Takis Gonias (Greek: Τάκης Γκώνιας; 6 October 1971 – 24 June 2026) was a Greek football manager and a player.

== Club career ==
Gonias began his career at local club Panathinaikos Kyriaki (not to be confused with Athens-based club Panathinaikos F.C.) at Kyriaki, Boeotia. He then moved to the region's most prestigious club Levadiakos, making his debut in the Alpha Ethnki, the top-level football league in Greece. He then went on to play for various top-level Greek clubs, including Olympiacos, Panionios and most successfully, Iraklis. After his good appearances with Iraklis, Gonias was transferred in 1998 to Sporting de Gijón in the Spanish Segunda Division. In 2004, he transferred to Italy and Serie A side Messina, where he played the last season of his career, despite making a transfer to Crotone in 2005.

== International career ==
Gonias made two appearances and scored one goal for Greece. He made his debut on 19 August 1997, managing to score with a penalty kick during a 2–1 victory over Cyprus. He received his second and final cap six months later, coming in as a second-half substitute for Kostas Frantzeskos during another international friendly game.

== Managerial career ==
=== Retirement and early career as manager ===
After his retirement, Gonias worked as a football commentator for Greek television, while also professionally taking up golf in Glyfada, Athens. However, he decided to return to professional football as a manager, starting his coaching career in 2013 at Glyfada and afterwards taking over management of Football League side Episkopi. In July 2016, Gonias was appointed manager of fellow 2nd tier club Kallithea, leading them for 8 games with a 2−0−6 record. A proposed move to Gamma Ethniki side Volos in June 2017 fell through, and in August 2017 he was appointed head coach of Cretan Ergotelis, newly back in the Football League.

=== Ergotelis ===
Gonias' unique approach to the game was met with suspicion from Greek media at first, even more so as the Cretans struggled to earn points on the table and became relegation contenders at an early stage during the tournament. Despite criticism from local media, as well as a portion of the club's fans, who often demanded Gonias be sacked from his post, Ergotelis' board placed their full trust in their head coach's work. After an experimental first round, Ergotelis' squad significantly improved and maintained an impressive good form, winning several key matches, scoring many goals, maintaining ball possession rates close to 60%-70% and eventually battling their way out of the relegation zone.

=== Wadi Degla ===
Earning credit for Ergotelis' impressive improvement and acclaimed performances, Ergotelis' owner Maged Samy offered Gonias the head coach position at his Egyptian Premier League club Wadi Degla starting from 12 June 2018. On 11 February 2020, Gonias was dismissed from his duties at Wadi Degla.

=== Pyramids ===
On 29 June 2021, he was hired by the Egyptian club Pyramids. However, he was dismissed after twelve matches in September of the same year. In April 2022, he was reappointed for a second tenure, then signed a new contract in September until 2025. On 5 January 2023, he was sacked from his position as head coach.

== Tactics ==
"In Greece we do not understand how the game of football is played. Even football players do not know how to play football. They know positioning on the pitch, but don't know the usefulness of the position. Football today is taught. Respect for the coach has disappeared in football. I have raised the bar and I will make it. I will succeed because of the know-how. When I was a player I was kicking a ball, I did not play football."

— Gonias on his approach to coaching during a TV interview, early in his managerial career.

Gonias' teams placed much emphasis on retaining possession of the ball and dictating play, often playing a high defensive line with the full-backs pushing high up their respective sides. His teams are usually young, and rely heavily on passing and positional interchange to retain possession, a style of play reminiscent of the tiki-taka style of football. As a result, his teams often achieve possession percentages close to 60-70% throughout the game, but are also known to easily concede goals on the counterattack. His unwavering approach to the game regardless of the opponent and match progression, has often been openly questioned by the press and fans as inappropriate for the realities of the second tier of the Greek football league system. Gonias has therefore built a reputation in Greece for his post-match analysis during statements to the press, and his tendency to get overly defensive when questioned about his tactics.

== Death ==
Gonias died on 24 June 2026, at the age of 54, after battling an unnamed illness.
