= Chania City F.C. =

Association football club in Greece

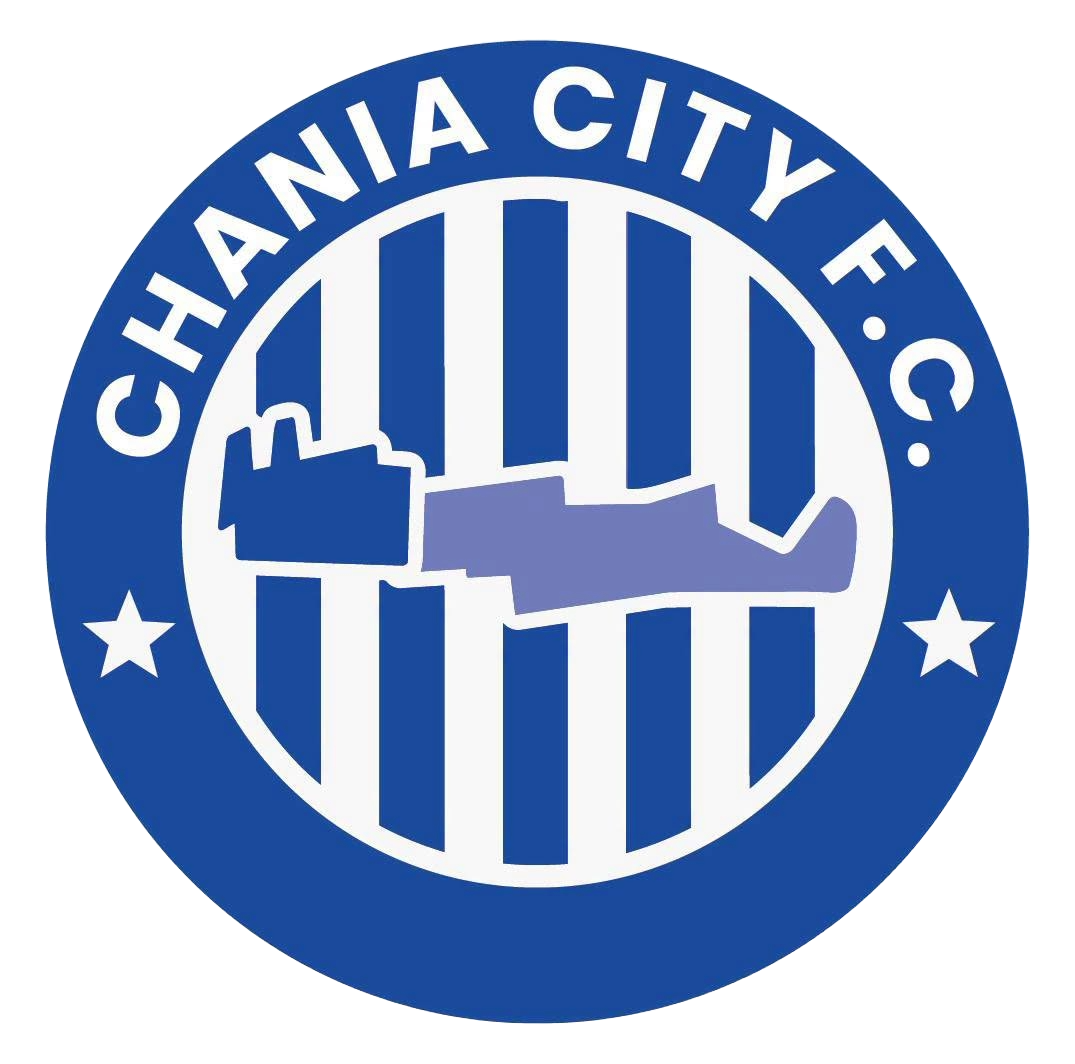
- Full name: Ποδοσφαιρικός Σύλλογος Κισσαμικός Χανιά
- Nickname: Κυανόλευκοι (The Blue-Whites)
- Founded: 23 August 2017; 9 years ago
- Ground: Perivolia Municipal Stadium
- Capacity: 4,527
- Chairman: Andreas Ioannou
- Coach: Nikos Nioplias
- League: Gamma Ethniki
- 2025–26: Super League Greece 2, South Group, 8th (relegated)
- Website: chaniafc.gr
Home colours	Away colours	Third colours

Chania City F.C. (Greek: Α.Σ. Χανιά Πόλη), also known as Chania FC, is a Greek professional football club based in Chania, Crete. They were established in 2017, as a result of a merger between the two regional clubs representing the Chania district in the Greek Second Division, PGS Kissamikos and AO Chania. The club currently plays in the Gamma Ethniki, the third tier of the Greek football league system.

== History ==
=== AO Chania – Kissamikos ===
During the 2016–17 Greek Second Division season, Chania were represented in the Greek Second Division by two clubs, namely AO Chania of the city of Chania, and Kissamikos, based in the neighboring town of Kissamos. Kissamikos had quickly established itself in the Football League, managing to outgrow, and eventually outperform its more prestigious local competitor AO Chania. Facing insurmountable financial issues, AO Chania were forcibly relegated to the Gamma Ethniki at the end of the season after being deducted 33 points, while simultaneously having its licence revoked. In the summer of 2017, Kissamikos owner at the time Antonis Rokakis proposed a merger of the two clubs in an attempt to form a new, strong outfit to represent the region, and more specifically the city of Chania (as the region's competitor in the Greek Super League, Platanias is based in the neighboring town and municipality of Platanias). The initiative was eventually approved on 19 August 2017, however, any club that would result from a potential merger would inherit the financial obligations of AO Chania. As such, Kissamikos changed its name to AO Chania − Kissamikos, retaining its original crest and colors, while the club's home ground was relocated to Perivolia Municipal Stadium in Mournies, Chania. The entire merger was met with fierce opposition by the supporters of Kissamikos. On the other hand, supporters of AO Chania demanded Kissamikos' name and crest be completely erased, basically turning the club into a modern continuation of AO Chania.

The new club became serious competitors in the two years following the merger, finishing 4th during the 2017–18 season, and 6th in 2018–19, thus becoming eligible to play in the 2019-formed Super League 2.

=== PAE Chania ===
In the summer of 2019, the club's board of directors changed the club's name to P.A.E. Chania (Greek: Π.Α.Ε. Χανιά), indicating their intent to represent the entire Chania regional unit. The 2019–20 season saw Chania FC achieve its best result to date, finishing third in the Super League 2.

During the 2020–21 season, the club finished 5th in the final standings, while over the next two seasons it placed 4th in the Southern Group. In the 2023–24 season, the team was again a title contender, narrowly missing out on promotion to the top tier by finishing 2nd, which marked the highest league position in its history. During the 2024–25 season, the club finished 7th in Group B and entered the play-outs, where it secured 1st place to maintain its spot in the division.

In the summer of 2025, a new chapter began in the historic football journey of Chania F.C. after 10 years, as Dimitris Drosos took over executive leadership following the departure of Antonis Rokakis, who had been at the helm for a decade. During the 2025–26 season, despite appointing five different head coaches, the team failed to avoid relegation from Super League Greece 2, leaving the city of Chania without a representative in the second tier for the first time after 13 consecutive years. The team finished penultimate (9th) in the regular season and eighth after the play-outs. Administrative changes during the preceding summer played a significant role in the Cretan side's poor campaign.

=== Chania City ===
Following its relegation to the Gamma Ethniki, PAE Chania returned to the jurisdiction of its parent sports club, P.G.S. Kissamikos. On 24 June 2026—coinciding with the club's centenary—the Chania Court of First Instance approved the renaming of P.G.S. Kissamikos to Chania City F.C., alongside the relocation of the club's headquarters from Kissamos to Chania.

== Stadium ==
After the merger, the club moved to AO Chania's Perivolia Municipal Stadium, a multi-purpose stadium in Mournies, Chania.

== Honours ==
=== Domestic Titles and honours ===
- Gamma Ethniki: (1)
  - 2014–15
- Chania FCA Champions: (4)
  - 1993–1994, 1996–1997, 2000–2001, 2011–2012
- Chania FCA Cup Winners: (1)
  - 1998–99
- Chania FCA Super Cup Winners: (1)
  - 2012

== Players ==
=== Current squad ===
As of 20 February 2026

Note: Flags indicate national team as defined under FIFA eligibility rules; some limited exceptions apply. Players may hold more than one non-FIFA nationality.

No.	Pos.	Nation	Player
1	GK	GRE	Manolis Ikonomakis
3	DF	GRE	Ilias Simantirakis
7	FW	JAM	Blair Turgott
8	MF	GRE	Titos Koutentakis
10	FW	NGR	Oche Ochowechi
11	MF	ARM	Edgar Movsesyan
12	FW	GRE	Antonis Kapnidis
13	DF	GRE	Georgios Koutroumpis (captain)
14	MF	EGY	Karim Hamed (on loan from Panserraikos)
15	DF	GRE	Georgios Valerianos
16	MF	PAR	Rodrigo López
17	FW	GRE	Theodoros Fanourakis (on loan from OFI)
18	DF	GRE	Georgios Servilakis
19	DF	ALB	Franko Lamçe
20	DF	GRE	Savvas Topalidis

No.	Pos.	Nation	Player
21	DF	ARM	Aventis Aventisian
22	MF	MDA	Vicu Bulmaga
23	MF	SRB	Andrija Luković
24	MF	FRA	Momo Diaby
26	DF	COD	Josué Mwimba Isala
27	DF	GRE	Manolis Tzanakakis
29	DF	GRE	Feizi Chasanoglou
30	MF	GRE	Christos Prevezianos
33	DF	SVK	Adam Kopas
60	MF	GRE	Vasilios Rados (on loan from Panetolikos)
67	DF	GRE	Apostolos Diamantis
68	MF	GRE	Konstantinos Panagiotoudis
77	MF	GRE	Athanasios Kostanasios
91	MF	SLO	Marko Vardic
92	GK	GRE	Michalis Agrimakis
97	GK	SRB	Stefan Stojanović
99	GK	GRE	Vangelis Kontogiannis
