= 2014–15 PAS Giannina F.C. season =

PAS Giannina
2014–15 season
- Chairman: Giorgos Christovasilis
- Manager: Giannis Petrakis
- Stadium: Zosimades Stadium, Ioannina
- Super League: 6th
- Greek Cup: Round of 16, eliminated by Chania
- Top goalscorer: League: Cristian Chávez, Michalis Manias; 8 goals All: Michalis Manias; 9 goals
- Highest home attendance: 4143; Panathinaikos
- Lowest home attendance: 935; Platanias
- Average home league attendance: 1670
Home colours	Away colours	Third colours

The 2014–15 season is PAS Giannina F.C.'s 20th competitive season in the top flight of Greek football, 5th season in the Super League Greece, and 49th year in existence as a football club. They also compete in the Greek Cup.

== Players ==
Updated:30 June 2015

No.	Name	Nationality	Position(s)	Place of birth	Date of birth	Signed from	Notes
Goalkeepers
1	Markos Vellidis	(Greece)	GK	Kastoria, Greece	4 April 1987	(Greece) Aris	
77	Dimitris Sotiriou	(Greece)	GK	Martino, Boeotia, Greece	13 September 1987	(Cyprus) Ermis Aradippou	
Defenders
2	Georgios Dasios (C)	(Greece)	RB	Ioannina, Greece	12 May 1983	-	
4	Thodoris Berios	(Greece)	CB	Athens, Greece	21 March 1989	(Czech Republic) Čáslav	
6	Alexios Michail (VC)	(Greece)	CB	Ioannina, Greece	18 August 1986	(Greece) Panserraikos	
8	Themistoklis Tzimopoulos (VC2)	(New Zealand) (Greece)	CB	Kozani, Greece	20 November 1985	(Greece) Ethnikos Asteras	
17	David López Nadales	(Spain)	LB	Zaragoza, Aragon, Spain	22 January 1986	(Romania) Săgeata Năvodari	
23	Andraž Struna	(Slovenia)	RB	Piran, SFR Yugoslavia	23 April 1989	(Poland) Cracovia	
44	Apostolos Skondras	(Greece)	CB	Athens, Greece	29 December 1988	(Greece) AEL	
Midfielders
7	Evripidis Giakos	(Greece)	CM / CF	Ioannina, Greece	9 April 1991	(Greece) Doxa Kranoula	
11	Noé Acosta	(Spain)	CM / LW	Guadalajara, Castilla-La Mancha, Spain	10 December 1983	(Greece) Olympiacos Volos	
15	Charis Charisis	(Greece)	DM / CM	Ioannina, Greece	12 January 1995	(Greece) PAS Giannina U20	
18	Michalis Avgenikou	(Greece)	DM / CM	Pastida, Rhodes, Greece	25 January 1993	(Greece) Diagoras	
19	Antonis Iliadis	(Greece)	CM	Imathia, Greece	27 July 1993	(Greece) Makrochori	
20	Giannis Ioannou	(Greece)	CM	Ioannina, Greece	27 May 1994	(Greece) PAS Giannina U-20	
21	Stavros Tsoukalas	(Greece)	CM	Thessaloniki, Greece	28 May 1988	(Greece) PAOK	
22	Cristian Gabriel Chávez	(Argentina)	CM	Lomas de Zamora, Argentina	4 June 1987	(Argentina) Almirante Brown	
33	Nikos Korovesis	(Greece)	LW	Chalkida, Greece	10 August 1991	(Greece) Apollon Smyrni	
93	Iraklis Garoufalias	(Greece)	DM / CM	Athens, Greece	1 May 1993	(Greece) Fostiras	
Forwards
9	Brana Ilić	(Serbia)	CF	Golubinci, SFR Yugoslavia	16 February 1985	(Kazakhstan) FC Aktobe	
14	Giannis Nakos	(Greece)	CF	Ioannina, Greece	23 February 1993	(Greece) PAS Giannina U-20	
25	Tasos Kritikos	(Greece)	CF	Larissa, Greece	25 January 1995	(Greece) AEL	
32	Michalis Manias	(Greece)	CF	Rhodes, Greece	20 February 1990	(Greece) Aris	
90	Stamatis Sapalidis	(Greece)	CF	Athens, Greece	5 July 1990	(Greece) Alimos	
Left during Winter Transfer Window
72	Andreas Gianniotis	(Greece)	GK	Serres, Greece	18 December 1992	(Greece) Olympiacos	loan
3	Andi Lila	(Albania)	DM	Kavajë, Albania	12 February 1986	(Albania) KF Tirana	

=== International players ===
- (Albania) Andi Lila (men's, U-21/19/17)
- (Greece) Markos Vellidis
- (New Zealand) Themistoklis Tzimopoulos
- (Slovenia) Andraž Struna (men's, U-21/20)
- (Serbia) Brana Ilić
- (Greece) Andreas Gianniotis (U-21)
- (Greece) Michalis Avgenikou (U-19)
- (Greece) Tasos Kritikos (U-19)

=== Foreign players ===
EU Nationals
- (Spain) (Europe) David López Nadales
- (Spain) (Europe) Noé Acosta
- (Slovenia) (Europe) Andraž Struna

EU Nationals (Dual Citizenship)
- (New Zealand) (Greece) (Europe) Themistoklis Tzimopoulos

Non-EU Nationals
- (Albania) Andi Lila
- (Serbia) Brana Ilić
- (Argentina) Cristian Chávez

== Personnel ==
=== Management ===
Position	Staff
Majority Owner	Giorgos Christovasilis
President and CEO	Giorgos Christovasilis
Director of Football	Dimitris Niarchakos
Director of Office	Alekos Potsis
Head of Ticket Department	Andreas Potsis
Head of Youth Department	Giorgos Ioannou

=== Coaching staff ===
Position	Name
Head coach	Giannis Petrakis
Assistant coach	Giorgos Georgoulopoulos
Fitness coach	Vasilis Alexiou
Goalkeepers Coach	Christos Tseliopoulos

=== medical staff ===
Position	Name
Physio	Filippos Skordos

=== Academy ===
Position	Name
Head of Youth Development	Giorgos Georgoulopoulos
Head coach U-20	Giannis Tatsis
Head coach U-17	Christos Agelis
Head coach U-15	Giorgos Oikonomou

== Transfers ==
=== Summer ===
==== In ====
No	Pos	Player	Transferred from	Fee	Date	Source
19	MF	Antonis Iliadis	Makrochori	-	6 June 2014	
90	FW	Stamatis Sapalidis	Alimos	-	23 June 2014	
3	MF	Andi Lila	Free	-	12 July 2014	
32	FW	Michalis Manias	Aris	-	4 August 2014	
72	GK	Andreas Gianniotis	Olympiacos	Loan	8 August 2014	
17	LB	David López Nadales	Săgeata Năvodari	-	2 September 2014	
93	MF	Iraklis Garoufalias	Fostiras	-	12 September 2014	

==== Out ====
No	Pos	Player	Transferred to	Fee	Date	Source
26	CB	Dimitris Kolovetsios	AEK Athens	€250,000	1 July 2014	
3	MF	Andi Lila	Rijeka	Canceled	30 June 2014	
11	FW	Emiljano Vila	Partizani Tirana	-	30 June 2014	
12	FW	Leonidas Kyvelidis	Apollon Smyrnis	-	30 June 2014	
40	GK	Georgios Abaris	Enosis Neon Paralimni	-	30 June 2014	
99	MF	Franck Songo'o		-	30 June 2014	
5	CB	Climaco Pinto Leandro	Olympiacos	End of loan	30 June 2014	
91	MF	Aurelian Chițu	Valenciennes	End of loan	30 June 2014	
96	FW	Kostas Kamperis		-	9 July 2014	
17	RB	Arben Muskaj	Partizani Tirana	Loan	14 August 2014	

=== Winter ===
==== In ====
-

==== Out ====
No	Pos	Player	Transferred to	Fee	Date	Source
3	MF	Andi Lila	Parma	Loan	26 December 2014	
72	GK	Andreas Gianniotis	Olympiacos	End of loan	26 January 2015	
20	MF	Giannis Ioannou	Thesprotos	Loan	2 February 2015	
-	GK	Nikos Koliofoukas	Thesprotos	Loan	2 February 2015	

== Pre-season and friendlies ==
Win Draw Loss Upcoming fixture

16 July 2014 Friendly	PAS Giannina	3–1	Levadiakos	Karpenisi
18:00	Chávez 36' (pen.); Ilić 82'; Kritikos 86'	Report	Ortega 10'	Stadium: Hotel Avaris Field; Attendance: unknown Referee: Nektarios Chrisafopoulos

19 July 2014 Friendly	PAS Giannina	2–0	Platanias	Karpenisi
18:00	Ilić 2', 26'	Report		Stadium: Athletic center of Karpenisi; Attendance: unknown Referee: unknown

22 July 2014 Friendly	PAS Giannina	1–2	Panionios	Karpenisi
16:30	Chávez 40'	Report	Bouzas 20'; Alexandros Smirlis 84'	Stadium: Athletic center of Karpenisi; Attendance: unknown Referee: unknown

30 July 2014 Friendly	Veria	0-1	PAS Giannina	Veria
18:30		Report	Ilić 16'	Stadium: Veria Stadium; Attendance: 600; Referee: Dimitrios Karantonis

2 August 2014 Friendly	PAS Giannina	0-1	Panetolikos	Ioannina
18:30		Report	Kappel 50'	Stadium: Zosimades Stadium; Attendance: 500; Referee: Alexandros Katsikogiannis

6 August 2014 Friendly	PAS Giannina	0–1	Kassiopi	Ioannina
18:30		Report	Gomes 35'	Stadium: Zosimades Stadium; Referee: Christos Mitsios

9 August 2014 Friendly	Panetolikos	3-1	PAS Giannina	Agrinio
18:30	Alves 21', 43'; Martínez 36'	Report	Chávez 83'	Stadium: Panetolikos Stadium; Attendance: 1000; Referee: Dimitris Styliaras

10 August 2014 Friendly	PAS Giannina	1-0	A.E. Karaiskakis	Ioannina
18:30	Sapalidis 54'	Report		Stadium: PEAKI; Attendance: 100; Referee: Konstantinos Katsoulidis

13 August 2014 Friendly	PAS Giannina	4-2	Veria	Ioannina
18:30	Chávez 2'; Giakos 36'; Acosta 66'; Sapalidis 69'	Report	Tsiamis 71'; Čović 80'	Stadium: Zosimades Stadium; Attendance: 300; Referee: Giorgos Tasis

8 October 2014 Friendly	PAS Giannina	1–1	KF Skënderbeu Korçë	Ioannina
16:00	Sapalidis 69'	Report	Alikaj 90'	Stadium: Zosimades Stadium; Referee: Alexandros Katsikogiannis

22 November 2014 Friendly	PAS Giannina	1-0	Anagennisi Arta	Ioannina
12:30	Giakos 58'	Report		Stadium: PEAKI; Referee: unknown

23 November 2014 Friendly	PAS Giannina	0–0	AEL	Ioannina
15:00		Report		Stadium: Zosimades Stadium; Referee: Apostolis Georgiou

== Competitions ==
=== League table ===
Pos	Team	Pld	W	D	L	GF	GA	GD	Pts	Qualification or relegation
4	Asteras Tripolis	34	17	8	9	52	37	+15	59	Qualification for the Play-offs
5	Atromitos	34	14	12	8	43	27	+16	54	Qualification for the Play-offs
6	PAS Giannina	34	13	14	7	47	33	+14	53	
7	Panetolikos	34	14	10	10	41	28	+13	52	
8	Skoda Xanthi	34	12	11	11	44	41	+3	47	

Source: Super League Greece
Rules for classification: 1) Points; 2) Head-to-head goal difference; 3) Head-to-head points; 4) Goals scored; 5) Play-offs (neutral ground).
(Note: Criteria 5 is only used if needed to decide champion, teams for relegation or teams for UEFA competitions). In any other case, the final standings of tied teams are determined with a public draw.

==== Results summary ====
Overall								Home						Away					
Pld	W	D	L	GF	GA	GD	Pts	W	D	L	GF	GA	GD	W	D	L	GF	GA	GD
34	13	14	7	47	33	+14	53	9	6	2	29	15	+14	4	8	5	18	18	0

==== Fixtures ====
Win Draw Loss Upcoming fixture

24 August 2014 1	PAS Giannina	3-1	Asteras Tripolis	Ioannina
19:15	Tzimopoulos (yellow card) 36'; Chávez 59'; Ilić 67'; Tzimopoulos 70'; Charisis (yellow card) 90+3'	Report	Barrales 42'; Papachristos (yellow card) 49' (yellow-red card) 73'; Kitoko (yellow card) 69'; Kourbelis (yellow card) 90+2'	Stadium: Zosimades Stadium; Attendance: 1499; Referee: Anastasios Sidiropoulos

30 August 2014 2	Panthrakikos	1-1	PAS Giannina	Komotini
19:15	Cherfa (yellow card) 35'; Tzanis 57'	Report	Acosta (yellow card) 31'; Acosta 32'; Lila (yellow card) 85'	Stadium: Komotini Municipal Stadium; Attendance: 934; Referee: Alexandros Aretopoulos

14 September 2014 3	PAS Giannina	2-2	Xanthi	Ioannina
18:15	Lila (yellow card) 27'; Michail (yellow card) 58'; Ilić 71'; Chávez 77'	Report	Soltani 21', 75'; Soltani (yellow card) 34'; Lucero (yellow card) 42'; Obodo (yellow card) 64' (yellow-red card) 90'; Komesidis (yellow card) 68'	Stadium: Zosimades Stadium; Attendance: 1831; Referee: Marios Labropoulos

21 September 2014 4	Kassiopi	2-0	PAS Giannina	Kerkyra
18:15	Michail 29' (o.g.); Ben (yellow card) 31'; Andreopoulos (yellow card) 33'; Marangos (yellow card) 37'; Gomes (yellow card) 54'; Zorbas 90+4'	Report	Giakos (yellow card) 37'; Korovesis (yellow card) 54'; Lila (yellow card) 64'	Stadium: Kerkyra Stadium; Attendance: 1620; Referee: Ioannis Delfakis

28 September 2014 5	Veria	2-0	PAS Giannina	Veria
18:15	Georgiadis (yellow card) 29'; Cámpora (yellow card) 35'; Cámpora 54'; Kaltsas 55'; Vertzos (yellow card) 82'	Report	Dasios (yellow card) 22' (yellow-red card) 39'	Stadium: Veria Stadium; Attendance: 2037; Referee: Alexandros Dimitropoulos

3 December 2014 6	PAS Giannina	0-4	Levadiakos	Ioannina
17:15	Berios (yellow card) 82'; Lila (yellow card) 90'	Report	Tomas 38'; Ortega (yellow card) 42'; Mantzios 43', 68'; Georgiadis (yellow card) 57'; Milosavljev 61'; Mantzios (yellow card) 82'	Stadium: Zosimades Stadium; Attendance: 1207; Referee: Anastasios Sidiropoulos

20 October 2014 7	Panionios	0-1	PAS Giannina	Nea Smyrni
19:30	Siopis (yellow card) 24'; Panos (yellow card) 78'	Report	Kritikos (yellow card) 35'; Acosta 62'; Sapalidis (yellow card) 88'	Stadium: Nea Smyrni Stadium; Attendance: 1083; Referee: Anastasios Papapetrou

25 October 2014 8	PAS Giannina	0-0	AEL Kalloni	Ioannina
15:00	Lila (yellow card) 21' (yellow-red card) 51'	Report		Stadium: Zosimades Stadium; Attendance: 1424; Referee: Stavros Mantalos

1 November 2014 9	Platanias	0-0	PAS Giannina	Platanias
15:00	Dimitris (yellow card) 27'	Report	Charisis (yellow card) 52'; Michail (yellow card) 68'	Stadium: Perivolia Municipal Stadium; Attendance: 1095; Referee: Giorgos Kominis

9 November 2014 10	PAS Giannina	4-0	Niki Volos	Ioannina
17:15	Michail 7'; Manias 49'; Ilić 75'; Tsoukalas 82'	Report	Tsoukanis (yellow card) 16'; Stambolziev (yellow card) 83'	Stadium: Zosimades Stadium; Attendance: 1380; Referee: Apostolos Abarkiolis

11 January 2015 11	Panetolikos	0-0	PAS Giannina	Agrinio
15:00	Godoy (yellow card) 79'	Report	Tsoukalas (yellow card) 8'; Tzimopoulos (yellow card) 77'	Stadium: Panetolikos Stadium; Attendance: 2750; Referee: Ilias Spathas

30 November 2014 12	PAS Giannina	3-0	OFI	Ioannina
17:15	Chávez (yellow card) 25'; Chávez 30', 45' (pen.); Charisis (yellow card) 74'; Ilić 87' (pen.)	Report	Adeleye (red card) 86'	Stadium: Zosimades Stadium; Attendance: 1794; Referee: Apostolos Abarkiolis

6 December 2014 13	Olympiacos	2-2	PAS Giannina	Piraeus
19:30	Fortounis 50' (pen.); Kasami 75'; N'Dinga (yellow card) 83'	Report	Michail 23'; Skondras (yellow card) 49'; Struna (yellow card) 49'; Nadales (yellow card) 74'; Avgenikou (yellow card) 76'; Giakos 88'	Stadium: Karaiskakis Stadium; Attendance: 15044; Referee: Stavros Mantalos

14 December 2014 14	PAS Giannina	1-0	Atromitos	Ioannina
17:15	Michail (yellow card) 61'; Chávez 67'	Report	Umbides (yellow card) 45'; Agouazi (yellow card) 62'; Pitu Garcia (yellow card) 64'	Stadium: Zosimades Stadium; Attendance: 1517; Referee: Giannis Delfakis

18 December 2014 15	PAS Giannina	3-0	PAOK	Ioannina
17:15	Lila 26'; Lila (yellow card) 27'; Korovesis 73'; Korovesis (yellow card) 74'; Manias 93'; Manias (yellow card) 90+4' (yellow-red card) 90+4'	Report	Vítor (yellow card) 13'; Athanasiadis (yellow card) 45+2'; Tzandaris (yellow card) 76'; Papadopoulos (yellow card) 90'	Stadium: Zosimades Stadium; Attendance: 3075; Referee: Michael Voskakis

21 December 2014 16	Ergotelis	1-0	PAS Giannina	Heraklion
17:15	Youssouf 9'; Bohdanov (yellow card) 59'; Kozoronis (yellow card) 87'	Report	Skondras (yellow card) 51'; Lila (yellow card) 86'	Stadium: Pankritio Stadium; Attendance: 1293; Referee: Anastasios Sidiropoulos

4 January 2015 17	PAS Giannina	0-0	Panathinaikos	Ioannina
19:30		Report	Lagos (yellow card) 47'; Bouy (yellow card) 75'; Berg (yellow card) 82'	Stadium: Zosimades Stadium; Attendance: 4143; Referee: Alexandros Aretopoulos

14 January 2015 18	Asteras Tripolis	2-2	PAS Giannina	Tripoli
17:15	Rolle 14'; Barrales 25'; Tsokanis 63'	Report	Tsoukalas (yellow card) 10'; Korovesis 43', 77'; Berios (yellow card) 74'; Skondras (yellow card) 85'; Vellidis (yellow card) 90+2'	Stadium: Theodoros Kolokotronis; Attendance: 1418; Referee: Dimitris Styliaras

18 January 2015 19	PAS Giannina	2-2	Panthrakikos	Ioannina
15:15	Manias 10', 57'; Dasios (yellow card) 45+1'	Report	Tsoumanis (yellow card) 18'; Diguiny (yellow card) 44'; Hasomeris 49'; Romeu (yellow card) 64'; Cases 84'	Stadium: Zosimades Stadium; Attendance: 1263; Referee: Ilias Spathas

24 January 2015 20	Xanthi	1-1	PAS Giannina	Xanthi
15:00	Cleyton 54'; Cleyton (yellow card) 71'	Report	Berios (yellow card) 10'; Dasios (yellow card) 26'; Nadales (yellow card) 74'; Chávez 75'; Acosta (yellow card) 78'	Stadium: Xanthi FC Arena; Attendance: 1176; Referee: Charalabos Kalogeropoulos

1 February 2015 21	PAS Giannina	2–1	Kassiopi	Ioannina
17:15	Ilić 44'; Manias 80'	Report	Javito 14'; Dimitrovski (yellow card) 57'	Stadium: Zosimades Stadium; Attendance: 1143; Referee: Giannis Kampaxis

4 February 2015 22	PAS Giannina	4-1	Veria	Ioannina
17:15	Tsoukalas 8'; Manias 15'; Tzimopoulos 18', 35'; Manias (yellow card) 24'; Michail (yellow card) 90+1'	Report	Marangos (yellow card) 7'; Vergonis 45'; Ben (yellow card) 71'	Stadium: Zosimades Stadium; Attendance: 1158; Referee: Alexandros Aretopoulos

7 February 2015 23	Levadiakos	1-2	PAS Giannina	Livadeia
15:00	Katidis 68'	Report	Tzimopoulos 38'; Struna (yellow card) 49'; Berios (yellow card) 53'; Charisis (yellow card) 61'; Manias 73'; Giakos (yellow card) 78'	Stadium: Levadia Municipal Stadium; Attendance: 864; Referee: Giannis Delfakis

14 February 2015 24	PAS Giannina	1-3	Panionios	Ioannina
17:15	Tsoukalas 55'; Charisis (yellow card) 57'; Korovesis (yellow card) 87'; Acosta (yellow card) 90+3'	Report	Boumal 45' (pen.); Ikonomou 71'; Chatziisaias 74'; Chatziisaias (yellow card) 90'; Ikonomou (yellow card) 90+3'	Stadium: Zosimades Stadium; Attendance: 1385; Referee: Michail Koukoulakis

21 February 2015 25	AEL Kalloni	1–0	PAS Giannina	Mytilene
17:15	Petropoulos 3'; Keita (yellow card) 18'; Jordi Vidal (yellow card) 42'; Tsabouris (yellow card) 90'; Juanma (yellow card) 90+2'	Report	Berios (yellow card) 57' (yellow-red card) 90+2'	Stadium: Mytilene Municipal Stadium; Attendance: 444; Referee: Charalabos Kalogeropoulos

18 March 2015 26	PAS Giannina	1–0	Platanias	Ioannina
15:00	Acosta (yellow card) 44'; Acosta 53'; Charisis (yellow card) 90+2'	Report	Torres (yellow card) 33'; Itoua (yellow card) 76'	Stadium: Zosimades Stadium; Attendance: 935; Referee: Ilias Spathas

27	Niki Volos	0–3	PAS Giannina	Volos
-		Without Game		Stadium: Panthessaliko Stadium; Referee: -

15 March 2015 28	PAS Giannina	0-0	Panetolikos	Ioannina
15:00	Tzimopoulos (yellow card) 31'; Korovesis (yellow card) 86'	Report	Kousas (yellow card) 44'; Scaramozzino (yellow card) 75'	Stadium: Zosimades Stadium; Attendance: C. doors Referee: Giorgos Kizas

21 March 2015 29	OFI	0–3	PAS Giannina	Heraklion
15:00		Without Game		Stadium: Theodoros Vardinogiannis Stadium; Referee: Stefanos Mantakis

5 April 2015 30	PAS Giannina	3-1	Olympiacos	Ioannina
19:30	Michail (yellow card) 15'; Ilić 32'; Tsoukalas (yellow card) 34'; Manias 42'; Acosta 74'; Acosta (yellow card) 79' (yellow-red card) 89'; Chávez (yellow card) 82'	Report	Salino (yellow card) 16'; Milivojević 68'; Jara (yellow card) 90'	Stadium: Zosimades Stadium; Attendance: 1513; Referee: Alexandros Aretopulos

19 April 2015 31	Atromitos	1-1	PAS Giannina	Athens
17:15	Fytanidis (yellow card) 48'; Brito (yellow card) 64'; Pitu Garcia 84'	Report	Chávez 13'; Tzimopoulos (yellow card) 26'; Nadales (yellow card) 45+2'; Ilić (yellow card) 77'; Chávez (yellow card) 90+3'	Stadium: Peristeri Stadium; Attendance: 1282; Referee: Konstantinos Ioannidis

26 April 2015 32	PAOK	1-1	PAS Giannina	Thessaloniki
15:00	Pereyra 14'; Golasa (yellow card) 46'; Koulouris (yellow card) 60'	Report	Chávez 12'; Charisis (yellow card) 22' (yellow-red card) 90+2'; Chávez (yellow card) 36'; Vellidis (yellow card) 88'	Stadium: Toumba Stadium; Attendance: 7355; Referee: Athanasios Giachos

3 May 2015 33	PAS Giannina	0-0	Ergotelis	Ioannina
19:00	Tzimopoulos (yellow card) 82'; Berios (yellow card) 86'; Vellidis (yellow card) 90+5'	Report	Šaranov (yellow card) 90+4'	Stadium: Zosimades Stadium; Attendance: 1456; Referee: Giorgos Daskalopoulos

10 May 2015 34	Panathinaikos	3-1	PAS Giannina	Athens
19:00	Klonaridis 4'; Karelis 50'; Lagos (yellow card) 53'; Lagos 60'	Report	Ilić 5'; Ilić (yellow card) 13'; Acosta (yellow card) 89'	Stadium: Leoforos Stadium; Attendance: 5248; Referee: Andreas Pappas

=== Greek cup ===
PAS Giannina will enter the Greek Cup at the Group stage.

=== Group B ===
Pos	Team	Pld	W	D	L	GF	GA	GD	Pts	Qualification	PAS	KER	APK	PAOK
1	PAS Giannina	3	2	1	0	4	2	+2	7	Round of 16		1–0	2–1	—
2	Kerkyra	3	1	1	1	3	1	+2	4	Round of 16	—		3–0	0–0
3	Apollon Kalamarias	3	1	0	2	2	5	−3	3		—	—		1–0
4	PAOK	3	0	2	1	1	2	−1	2		1–1	—	—	

Source: epo.gr

==== Matches ====
25 September 2014 1	PAS Giannina	1–0	Kassiopi	Ioannina
16:30	Acosta 14'; Kritikos (yellow card) 58'; Michail (yellow card) 70'; Avgenikou (yellow card) 86'	Report	Kanakoudis (yellow card) 36'; Obradović (yellow card) 39'	Stadium: Zosimades Stadium; Referee: Dimitris Karantonis

29 October 2014 2	PAOK	1-1	PAS Giannina	Thessaloniki
19:30	Tziolis 57'; Vítor (yellow card) 87'; Athanasiadis (yellow card) 87'	Report	Ilić 22'; Garoufalias (yellow card) 35'; Avgenikou (yellow card) 59'; Gianniotis (yellow card) 80'	Stadium: Toumba Stadium; Referee: Ioannis Delfakis

7 January 2015 3	PAS Giannina	2–1	Apollon Kalamarias	Ioannina
17:15	Giakos 25'; Manias 63' (pen.)	Report	Tsoutsis 36' stavros vangelopoulos (yellow card) 53'; Christos Karabelas (yellow card) 62'	Stadium: Zosimades Stadium; Referee: Anastasios Papapetrou

==== Round of 16 ====
21 January 2015 1st leg	Chania	1-2	PAS Giannina	Platanias
15:00	Rafael Soukias 89'	Report	Kritikos 37'; Acosta 68'	Stadium: Perivolia Municipal Stadium; Referee: Giannis Kampaxis

28 January 2015 2nd leg	PAS Giannina	1-2 (a.e.t.) (3–5 p)	Chania	Ioannina
17:15	Kritikos (yellow card) 34' (yellow-red card) 43'; Sapalidis 39'; Giakos (yellow card) 74'	Report	Giannis Goumas (yellow card) 15'; Karagiannis (yellow card) 48'; Kritikos 53'; Kritikos (yellow card) 65'; Ngwem (yellow card) 75'; Gotovos (yellow card) 76'; Gotovos 85'; Konteon (yellow card) 106'	Stadium: Zosimades Stadium; Referee: Aristomenis Koutsiaftis
	Penalties
	Manias (penalty missed); Dasios (penalty scored); Nadales (penalty scored); Tzimopoulos (penalty scored)		(penalty scored) Kritikos; (penalty scored) Gotovos; (penalty scored) González; (penalty scored) Konteon; (penalty scored) Pangalos

== Statistics ==
=== Appearances ===
No.	Pos.	Nat.	Name	Greek Super League	Greek Cup	Total
No.	Pos.	Nat.	Name	Apps	Apps	Apps
1	GK	(Greece)	Markos Vellidis	32	0	32
2	RB	(Greece)	Georgios Dasios	19	4	23
3	DM	(Albania)	Andi Lila	14	0	14
4	CB	(Greece)	Thodoris Berios	22	3	25
6	CB	(Greece)	Alexios Michail	31	4	35
7	CM / CF	(Greece)	Evripidis Giakos	23	5	28
8	CB	(New Zealand) (Greece)	Themistoklis Tzimopoulos	28	1	29
9	CF	(Serbia)	Brana Ilić	31	2	33
11	CM / LW	(Spain)	Noé Acosta	28	2	30
14	CF	(Greece)	Giannis Nakos	0	1	1
15	DM / CM	(Greece)	Charis Charisis	22	3	25
17	LB	(Spain)	David López Nadales	19	5	24
18	DM / CM	(Greece)	Michalis Avgenikou	4	5	9
19	MF	(Greece)	Antonis Iliadis	2	5	7
20	CM	(Greece)	Giannis Ioannou	0	0	0
21	CM	(Greece)	Stavros Tsoukalas	31	3	34
22	CM	(Argentina)	Cristian Gabriel Chávez	28	1	29
23	RB	(Slovenia)	Andraž Struna	30	2	32
25	CF	(Greece)	Tasos Kritikos	3	4	7
32	FW	(Greece)	Michalis Manias	28	5	33
33	LW	(Greece)	Nikos Korovesis	24	0	24
44	CB	(Greece)	Apostolos Skondras	9	4	13
72	GK	(Greece)	Andreas Gianniotis	0	1	1
77	GK	(Greece)	Dimitris Sotiriou	1	4	5
90	FW	(Greece)	Stamatis Sapalidis	13	4	17
93	MF	(Greece)	Iraklis Garoufalias	1	2	3

Super League Greece

=== Goalscorers ===
No.	Pos.	Nat.	Name	Greek Super League	Greek Cup	Total
No.	Pos.	Nat.	Name	Goals	Goals	Goals
32	FW	(Greece)	Michalis Manias	8	1	9
22	CM	(Argentina)	Cristian Gabriel Chávez	8	0	8
9	CF	(Serbia)	Brana Ilić	7	1	8
11	CM / LW	(Spain)	Noé Acosta	4	2	6
8	CB	(New Zealand) (Greece)	Themistoklis Tzimopoulos	4	0	4
21	CM	(Greece)	Stavros Tsoukalas	3	0	3
33	LW	(Greece)	Nikos Korovesis	3	0	3
6	CB	(Greece)	Alexios Michail	2	0	2
7	CM / CF	(Greece)	Evripidis Giakos	1	1	2
3	DM	(Albania)	Andi Lila	1	0	1
25	CF	(Greece)	Tasos Kritikos	0	1	1
90	FW	(Greece)	Stamatis Sapalidis	0	1	1
			Other	6	0	6

Super League Greece

Matches with Niki Volos and OFI awarded 0-3 by FA decision.

=== Clean sheets ===
No.	Pos.	Nat.	Name	Greek Super League	Greek Cup	Total
No.	Pos.	Nat.	Name	CS	CS	CS
1	GK	(Greece)	Markos Vellidis	12 (32)	0 (0)	12 (32)
72	GK	(Greece)	Andreas Gianniotis	0 (0)	0 (1)	0 (1)
77	GK	(Greece)	Dimitris Sotiriou	0 (1)	1 (4)	1 (5)

=== Best goal and MVP awards winners ===
MD	MVP award	Best goal award
12	Cristian Chávez	-
13	-	Evripidis Giakos
15	Andi Lila	-
18	Nikos Korovesis	-
20	Marcos Vellidis	-
23	Stavros Tsoukalas	-
28	Marcos Vellidis	-
30	Brana Ilić	Michalis Manias

=== Disciplinary record ===
S	P	N	Name	Super League			Greek Cup			Total		
S	P	N	Name	Yellow card	Yellow-red card	Red card	Yellow card	Yellow-red card	Red card	Yellow card	Yellow-red card	Red card
1	GK	(Greece)	Markos Vellidis	3	0	0	0	0	0	3	0	0
2	RB	(Greece)	Georgios Dasios	2	1	0	0	0	0	2	1	0
3	DM	(Albania)	Andi Lila	6	1	0	0	0	0	6	1	0
4	CB	(Greece)	Thodoris Berios	5	1	0	0	0	0	5	1	0
6	CB	(Greece)	Alexios Michail	5	0	0	1	0	0	6	0	0
7	CM / CF	(Greece)	Evripidis Giakos	2	0	0	1	0	0	3	0	0
8	CB	(New Zealand) (Greece)	Themistoklis Tzimopoulos	5	0	0	0	0	0	5	0	0
9	CF	(Serbia)	Brana Ilić	2	0	0	0	0	0	2	0	0
11	CM / LW	(Spain)	Noé Acosta	5	1	0	0	0	0	5	1	0
15	DM / CM	(Greece)	Charis Charisis	6	1	0	0	0	0	6	1	0
17	LB	(Spain)	David López Nadales	3	0	0	0	0	0	3	0	0
18	DM / CM	(Greece)	Michalis Avgenikou	1	0	0	2	0	0	3	0	0
21	CM	(Greece)	Stavros Tsoukalas	3	0	0	0	0	0	3	0	0
22	CM	(Argentina)	Cristian Gabriel Chávez	4	0	0	0	0	0	4	0	0
23	RB	(Slovenia)	Andraž Struna	2	0	0	0	0	0	2	0	0
25	CF	(Greece)	Tasos Kritikos	1	0	0	1	1	0	2	1	0
32	FW	(Greece)	Michalis Manias	2	1	0	0	0	0	2	1	0
33	LW	(Greece)	Nikos Korovesis	4	0	0	0	0	0	4	0	0
44	CB	(Greece)	Apostolos Skondras	3	0	0	0	0	0	3	0	0
72	GK	(Greece)	Andreas Gianniotis	0	0	0	1	0	0	0	1	0
90	FW	(Greece)	Stamatis Sapalidis	1	0	0	0	0	0	1	0	0
93	MF	(Greece)	Iraklis Garoufalias	0	0	0	1	0	0	1	0	0

=== Awards ===
Best Manager in Greece:Giannis Petrakis

Best Goalkeeper in Greece:Markos Vellidis

Best Young player in Greece:Charis Charisis

Best 11 (Goalkeeper):Markos Vellidis
