= 2014–15 Greek Football Cup =

2014–15 Greek Cup

Tournament details
- Country: Greece
- Teams: 46

Final positions
- Champions: Olympiacos (27th title)
- Runners-up: Skoda Xanthi

Tournament statistics
- Matches played: 99
- Goals scored: 220 (2.22 per match)
- Top goal scorer(s): Igor Angulo (6 goals)

The 2014–15 Greek Football Cup was the 73rd edition of the Greek Football Cup. A total of 46 clubs, just as the last edition, were accepted to enter. The competition commenced on 28 August 2014 with the preliminary round and concluded on 23 May 2015 with the final, at the Olympic Stadium. The winner of the competition was Olympiacos for 27th time.

== Teams ==
Round	Clubs remaining	Clubs involved	Winners from previous round	New entries	Leagues entering
Preliminary round	46	28	none	28	Football League
Group Stage	32	32	14	18	Super League
Round of 16	16	16	16	none	none
Quarter-finals	8	8	8	none	none
Semi-finals	4	4	4	none	none
Final	2	2	2	none	none

== Calendar ==
Round	Date(s)	Fixtures	Clubs	New entries
Preliminary round	28–30 August, 1, 12–14 September 2014	24	46 → 32	28
Group Stage	23–25 September, 28–30 October 2014 & 7, 8 January 2015	46	32 → 16	18
Round of 16	20–22, 27–29 January 2015	16	16 → 8	none
Quarter-finals	11, 12 February & 4, 5, 11 March 2015	8	8 → 4	none
Semi-finals	8, 9, 29 April 2015	4	4 → 2	none
Final	23 May 2015	1	2 → 1	none

== Participating clubs ==
2014–15 Super League	2014–15 Football League; South Group	2014–15 Football League; North Group
AEL Kalloni; Asteras Tripolis; Atromitos; Ergotelis; Kerkyra; Levadiakos; Niki Volos; OFI; Olympiacos; Panathinaikos; Panetolikos; Panionios; Panthrakikos; PAOK; PAS Giannina; Platanias; Skoda Xanthi; Veria	Acharnaikos; AEK Athens; Apollon Smyrnis; Chania; Episkopi; Ermionida; Fokikos; Fostiras; Iraklis Psachna; Kallithea; Panachaiki; Panegialios; Paniliakos; Trachones	AEL; Agrotikos Asteras; Aiginiakos; Anagennisi Karditsa; Apollon Kalamarias; Aris (withdrawn); Doxa Drama (withdrawn); Ethnikos Gazoros; Iraklis; Lamia; Olympiacos Volos; Pierikos; Tyrnavos; Zakynthos

== Preliminary round ==
The draw for this round took place on 18 August 2014.

=== South Group ===
==== Summary ====
Team 1	Agg.	Team 2	1st leg	2nd leg
Panachaiki	4–1	Paniliakos	3–0	1–1
Chania	7–2	Trachones	4–0	3–2
Kallithea	2–3	Apollon Smyrnis	1–1	1–2
Acharnaikos	0–1	Fostiras	0–0	0–1
AEK Athens	5–0	Fokikos	4–0	1–0
Ermionida	(a) 2–2	Panegialios	0–1	2–1
Iraklis Psachna	3–1	Episkopi	1–1	2–0

==== Matches ====
28 August 2014
17:00 EEST

Panachaiki	3–0	Paniliakos
Ala 20'; Maroukakis 49', 52'	Report

Pampeloponnisiako Stadium, Patras
Referee: Iosif Sfakianakis (Athens)
14 September 2014
16:30 EEST

Paniliakos	1–1	Panachaiki
Tsitas 54'	Report	Balu 18'

Pyrgos Municipal Stadium, Elis
Referee: Nikos Ratsiatos (Argolida)

Panachaiki won 4–1 on aggregate.

28 August 2014
19:00 EEST

Chania	4–0	Trachones
Manolas 6'; Karalis 53'; Pangalos 59' (pen.); Karagiannis 88'	Report

Perivolia Municipal Stadium, Chania
Referee: Georgios Foukakis (Heraklion)
14 September 2014
16:30 EEST

Trachones	2–3	Chania
Karameris 39'; Ioannou 70' (pen.)	Report	Konteon 65'; Kritikos 74'; Nikolopoulos 75' (o.g.)

Michalis Kritikopoulos Stadium, Kaisariani
Referee: Giorgos Tzovaras (Phthiotis)

Chania won 7–2 on aggregate.

29 August 2014
18:00 EEST

Kallithea	1–1	Apollon Smyrnis
Brilakis 38'	Report	Angulo 83'

Nea Smyrni Stadium, Nea Smyrni
Referee: Angelos Evangelou (Athens)
13 September 2014
17:00 EEST

Apollon Smyrnis	2–1	Kallithea
Angulo 83'; Gonzales 89'	Report	Piccolo 90+5'

Georgios Kamaras Stadium, Rizoupoli
Referee: Georgios Foukakis (Heraklion)

Apollon Smyrnis won 3–2 on aggregate.

29 August 2014
18:00 EEST

Acharnaikos	0–0	Fostiras
	Report

Acharnes Municipal Stadium, Acharnes
Referee: Spyros Selimos (Laconia)
13 September 2014
16:30 EEST

Fostiras	1–0	Acharnaikos
Cebeci 21'	Report

Tavros Stadium, Tavros
Referee: Vasilis Panagiotopoulos (Aetoloacarnania)

Fostiras won 1–0 on aggregate.

29 August 2014
20:00 EEST

AEK Athens	4–0	Fokikos
Kolovetsios 24'; Platellas 57'; Barbosa 68'; Anakoglou 71'	Report

Olympic Stadium, Marousi
Attendance: 12,000
Referee: Aristeidis Vatsios (West Attica)
12 September 2014
18:00 EEST

Fokikos	0–1	AEK Athens
	Report	Faye 90+1'

Amfissa Municipal Stadium, Amfissa
Attendance: 1,000
Referee: Alekos Tsamouris (Piraeus)

AEK Athens won 5–0 on aggregate.

30 August 2014
18:00 EEST

Ermionida	0–1	Panegialios
	Report	Ioannou 57'

Corinth Municipal Stadium, Corinth
Referee: Giorgos Blanas (Messinia)
14 September 2014
16:30 EEST

Panegialios	1–2	Ermionida
Skartsilas 8'	Report	Vlachopoulos 45+1'; Karademitros 52'

Aigio Municipal Stadium, Aigio
Referee: Konstantinos Kariofillis (Piraeus)

Ermionida won on away goals.

30 August 2014
20:00 EEST

Iraklis Psachna	1–1	Episkopi
Fligos 23'	Report	Radović 63'

Psachna Municipal Stadium, Euboea
Referee: Evangelos Kordolemis (East Attica)
13 September 2014
16:30 EEST

Episkopi	0–2	Iraklis Psachna
	Report	Posinković 28'; Patsatzoglou 42' (pen.)

Episkopi Municipal Stadium, Rethymno
Referee: Nikos Papageorgiou (Athens)

Iraklis Psachna won 3–1 on aggregate.

=== North Group ===
==== Matches ====
Team 1	Agg.	Team 2	1st leg	2nd leg
Apollon Kalamarias	6–0	Aris	3–0 (w/o)	3–0 (w/o)
Iraklis	(a) 2–2	Lamia	1–0	1–2
Aiginiakos	(a) 1–1	Agrotikos Asteras	0–0	1–1
Pierikos	1–3	Tyrnavos	0–1	1–2
Doxa Drama	0–6	Zakynthos	0–3 (w/o)	0–3 (w/o)
Anagennisi Karditsa	(a) 1–1	Ethnikos Gazoros	1–1	0–0
AEL	0–1	Olympiacos Volos	0–1	0–0

==== Matches ====
29 August 2014
17:00 EEST

Apollon Kalamarias	3–0 (Awarded)	Aris
	Report

Kalamaria Stadium, Thessaloniki
12 September 2014
EEST

Aris	0–3 (Awarded)	Apollon Kalamarias
	Report

Kleanthis Vikelidis Stadium, Thessaloniki

Apollon Kalamarias won 6–0 on aggregate.

29 August 2014
18:00 EEST

Iraklis	1–0	Lamia
Perrone 45' (pen.)	Report

Kaftanzoglio Stadium, Thessaloniki
Referee: Panagiotis Simeonidis (Pieria)
12 September 2014
17:00 EEST

Lamia	2–1	Iraklis
Neofytos 42'; Yenga 78' (pen.)	Report	Toskas 15'

Lamia Municipal Stadium, Lamia
Referee: Athanasios Tzilos (Larissa)

Iraklis won on away goals.

29 August 2014
18:00 EEST

Aiginiakos	0–0	Agrotikos Asteras
	Report

Aiginio Municipal Stadium, Aiginio
Referee: Konstantinos Kotsanis (Drama)
14 September 2014
16:30 EEST

Agrotikos Asteras	1–1	Aiginiakos
Krystallis 80'	Report	Koutsospyros 55'

Agrotikos Asteras Ground, Evosmos
Referee: Konstantinos Balatsoukas (Thesprotia)

Aiginiakos won on away goals.

30 August 2014
18:00 EEST

Pierikos	0–1	Tyrnavos
	Report	Tsoukalοs 18'

Litochoro Municipal Stadium, Litochoro
Referee: Ioannis Papadopoulos (Macedonia)
14 September 2014
16:30 EEST

Tyrnavos	2–1	Pierikos
Solferino 75'; Tsoukalos 90+1'	Report	Marković 35' (pen.)

Alkazar Stadium, Larissa
Referee: Evangelos Gratsanis (Trikala)

Tyrnavos won 3–1 on aggregate.

30 August 2014
18:00 EEST

Doxa Drama	0–3 (Awarded)	Zakynthos
	Report

Doxa Drama Stadium, Drama
12 September 2014
EEST

Zakynthos	3–0 (Awarded)	Doxa Drama
	Report

Zakynthos Municipal Stadium, Zakynthos

Zakynthos won 6–0 on aggregate.

30 August 2014
20:00 EEST

Anagennisi Karditsa	1–1	Ethnikos Gazoros
Koulidis 13'	Report	Pallas 80'

Karditsa Municipal Stadium, Karditsa
Referee: Georgios Kiriazidis (Evros)
14 September 2014
16:30 EEST

Ethnikos Gazoros	0–0	Anagennisi Karditsa
	Report

Serres Municipal Stadium, Serres
Referee: Manolis Skoulas (Thessaly)

Ethnikos Gazoros won on away goals.

1 September 2014
21:30 EEST

AEL	0–1	Olympiacos Volos
	Report	Nikolias 85'

Alcazar Stadium, Larissa
Referee: Dimitrios Karantonis (Imathia)
12 September 2014
20:30 EEST

Olympiacos Volos	0–0	AEL
	Report

Volos Municipal Stadium, Volos
Referee: Dimitris Styliaras (Aetoloacarnania)

Olympiacos Volos won 1–0 on aggregate.

== Group stage ==
The draw for this round took place on 15 September 2014.

Pot 1
Team
Olympiacos
Panathinaikos
PAOK
Atromitos
Asteras Tripolis
OFI
Ergotelis
Levadiakos

Pot 2
Team
Panetolikos
Panthrakikos
PAS Giannina
Kalloni
Panionios
Platanias
Veria
Skoda Xanthi

Pot 3
Team
Niki Volos
Kerkyra
Ermionida
Fostiras
Ethnikos Gazoros
AEK Athens
Tyrnavos
Chania

Pot 4
Team
Apollon Smyrnis
Olympiacos Volos
Aiginiakos
Iraklis Psachna
Panachaiki
Iraklis
Zakynthos
Apollon Kamalarias

=== Group A ===
Pos	Team	Pld	W	D	L	GF	GA	GD	Pts	Qualification	OLY	PNN	PNC	FOS
1	Olympiacos	3	2	1	0	4	1	+3	7	Round of 16		1–1	—	—
2	Panionios	3	1	2	0	5	1	+4	5	Round of 16	—		4–0	0–0
3	Panachaiki	3	1	0	2	2	5	−3	3		0–1	—		—
4	Fostiras	3	0	1	2	0	4	−4	1		—	0–2	0–2	

Source: epo.gr
23 September 2014
19:00 EEST

Panachaiki	0–1	Olympiacos
	Report	Kargas 74' (o.g.)

Pampeloponnisiako Stadium, Patras
Referee: Athanasios Giachos (Chios)
24 September 2014
19:00 EEST

Panionios	0–0	Fostiras
	Report

Nea Smyrni Stadium, Nea Smyrni
Referee: Georgios Kominis (Thesprotia)

28 October 2014
17:15 EET

Fostiras	0–2	Panachaiki
	Report	Maroukakis 36'; Patiniotis 64'

Tavros Stadium, Tavros
Referee: Fotis Fotiadis (Kastoria)
29 October 2014
19:30 EET

Olympiacos	1–1	Panionios
Fortounis 13'	Report	Mitropoulos 24'

Karaiskakis Stadium, Piraeus
Referee: Stefanos Mantakis (Imathia)

7 January 2015
19:30 EET

Fostiras	0–2	Olympiacos
	Report	Fortounis 16' (pen.); Diamantakos 82'

Tavros Stadium, Tavros
Referee: Ioannis Papadopoulos (Macedonia)
7 January 2015
19:30 EET

Panionios	4–0	Panachaiki
Giannou 19', 66'; Kolovos 53' (pen.), 55'	Report

Nea Smyrni Stadium, Nea Smyrni
Referee: Dimitrios Styliaras (Aetoloacarnania)

=== Group B ===
Pos	Team	Pld	W	D	L	GF	GA	GD	Pts	Qualification	PAS	KER	APK	PAOK
1	PAS Giannina	3	2	1	0	4	2	+2	7	Round of 16		1–0	2–1	—
2	Kerkyra	3	1	1	1	3	1	+2	4	Round of 16	—		3–0	0–0
3	Apollon Kalamarias	3	1	0	2	2	5	−3	3		—	—		1–0
4	PAOK	3	0	2	1	1	2	−1	2		1–1	—	—	

Source: epo.gr
25 September 2014
16:30 EEST

PAS Giannina	1–0	Kerkyra
Acosta 14'	Report

Zosimades Stadium, Ioannina
Referee: Dimitrios Karantonis (Imathia)
25 September 2014
19:00 EEST

Apollon Kalamarias	1–0	PAOK
Efstathiou 18'	Report

Kaftanzoglio Stadium, Thessaloniki
Referee: Christos Mitsios (Epirus)

29 October 2014
19:30 EET

PAOK	1–1	PAS Giannina
Tziolis 57'	Report	Ilić 23'

Toumba Stadium, Thessaloniki
Attendance: Giannis Delfakis (Arcadia)
30 October 2014
15:00 EET

Kerkyra	3–0	Apollon Kalamarias
Gomes 77' (pen.); Javito 78', 84'	Report

Kerkyra Stadium, Corfu
Referee: Christos Mitsios (Epirus)

7 January 2015
17:15 EET

Kerkyra	0–0	PAOK
	Report

Kerkyra Stadium, Corfu
Referee: Alexandros Dimitropoulos (Phthiotis)
7 January 2015
17:15 EET

PAS Giannina	2–1	Apollon Kalamarias
Giakos 25'; Manias 64' (pen.)	Report	Tsoutsis 35'

Zosimades Stadium, Ioannina
Referee: Anastasios Papapetrou (Athens)

=== Group C ===
Pos	Team	Pld	W	D	L	GF	GA	GD	Pts	Qualification	OFI	SKO	ZAK	NIK
1	OFI	3	2	1	0	5	1	+4	7	Round of 16		1–0	—	—
2	Skoda Xanthi	3	2	0	1	4	2	+2	6	Round of 16	—		3–1	1–0
3	Zakynthos	3	1	1	1	5	4	+1	4		1–1	—		—
4	Niki Volos	3	0	0	3	0	7	−7	0		0–3	—	0–3	

Source: epo.gr
24 September 2014
16:30 EEST

Skoda Xanthi	1–0	Niki Volos
Ranos 81'	Report

Skoda Xanthi Arena, Xanthi
Referee: Ioannis Papadopoulos (Macedonia)
24 September 2014
16:30 EEST

Zakynthos	1–1	OFI
Varela 68'	Report	Makris 44' (pen.)

Zakynthos Municipal Stadium, Zakynthos
Referee: Alexandros Katsikogiannis (Epirus)

30 October 2014
17:15 EET

Niki Volos	0–3 (Awarded)	Zakynthos
	Report

Panthessaliko Stadium, Volos
Referee: Michalis Voskakis (Rethymnο)
30 October 2014
19:30 EET

OFI	1–0	Skoda Xanthi
George 84'	Report

Theodoros Vardinogiannis Stadium, Heraklion
Referee: Praxitelis Zachariadis (Macedonia)

8 January 2015
15:00 EET

Niki Volos	0–3 (Awarded)	OFI
	Report

Panthessaliko Stadium, Volos
8 January 2015
15:00 EET

Skoda Xanthi	3–1	Zakynthos
Wallace 28'; Papasterianos 31'; Soltani 59'	Report	Efthimiadis 45'

Skoda Xanthi Arena, Xanthi
Referee: Georgios Kyzas (Drama)

=== Group D ===
Pos	Team	Pld	W	D	L	GF	GA	GD	Pts	Qualification	LEV	IRA	PLA	ETH
1	Levadiakos	3	2	1	0	5	1	+4	7	Round of 16		—	2–0	—
2	Iraklis	3	1	2	0	3	2	+1	5	Round of 16	1–1		—	—
3	Platanias	3	1	1	1	3	3	0	4		—	—		3–1
4	Ethnikos Gazoros	3	0	0	3	2	7	−5	0		0–2	1–2	—	

Source: epo.gr
23 September 2014
16:30 EEST

Iraklis	1–1	Levadiakos
Siatravanis 9'	Report	Bordagaray 60'

Kaftanzoglio Stadium, Thessaloniki
Referee: Georgios Kyzas (Drama)
24 September 2014
16:30 EEST

Platanias	3–1	Ethnikos Gazoros
Milunović 28'; Nazlidis 67'; Zaradoukas 90'	Report	Pallas 51'

Perivolia Municipal Stadium, Chania
Referee: Thaleia Mitsi (Piraeus)

28 October 2014
17:15 EET

Ethnikos Gazoros	1–2	Iraklis
Tsouvaltsidis 55'	Report	Kyriakidis 6'; Pasas 22'

Serres Municipal Stadium, Serres
Referee: Evangelos Gratsanis (Trikala)
29 October 2014
15:00 EET

Levadiakos	2–0	Platanias
Itoua 19' (o.g.); Bordagaray 28'	Report

Levadia Municipal Stadium, Levadia
Referee: Dimitrios Thanos (Grevena)

7 January 2015
15:00 EET

Ethnikos Gazoros	0–2	Levadiakos
	Report	Milosavljev 41', 80'

Serres Municipal Stadium, Serres
Referee: Vangelis Kiotzenis (Thrace)
7 January 2015
15:00 EET

Platanias	0–0	Iraklis
	Report

Perivolia Municipal Stadium, Chania
Referee: Marios Lampropoulos (Elis)

=== Group E ===
Pos	Team	Pld	W	D	L	GF	GA	GD	Pts	Qualification	AEK	PNT	ATR	IRP
1	AEK Athens	3	2	1	0	6	0	+6	7	Round of 16		—	3–0	3–0
2	Panthrakikos	3	1	2	0	3	2	+1	5	Round of 16	0–0		—	2–1
3	Atromitos	3	1	1	1	2	4	−2	4		—	1–1		—
4	Iraklis Psachna	3	0	0	3	1	6	−5	0		—	—	0–1	

Source: epo.gr
23 September 2014
16:30 EEST

Iraklis Psachna	0–1	Atromitos
	Report	Kouros 75'

Psachna Municipal Stadium, Euboea
Referee: Aristeidis Vatsios (West Attica)
24 September 2014
16:30 EEST

Panthrakikos	0–0	AEK Athens
	Report

Komotini Municipal Stadium, Komotini
Attendance: 5,000
Referee: Dimitrios Thanos (Grevena)

28 October 2014
19:30 EET

AEK Athens	3–0	Iraklis Psachna
Cordero 42'; Mantalos 66'; Bakakis 79'	Report

Olympic Stadium, Marousi
Attendance: 7,852
Referee: Aristeidis Vatsios (West Attica)
29 October 2014
15:00 EET

Atromitos	1–1	Panthrakikos
Tatos 77'	Report	Chasomeris 87'

Peristeri Stadium, Peristeri
Referee: Alexandros Dimitropoulos (Phthiotis)

8 January 2015
17:15 EET

AEK Athens	3–0	Atromitos
Aravidis 5'; Lampropoulos 29'; Tzanetopoulos 58'	Report

Olympic Stadium, Marousi
Attendance: 12,204
Referee: Anastasios Sidiropoulos (Dodecanese)
8 January 2015
17:15 EET

Panthrakikos	2–1	Iraklis Psachna
Chasomeris 42'; Araba 59'	Report	Chimodzi 67'

Komotini Municipal Stadium, Komotini
Referee: Giorgos Kominis (Thesprotia)

=== Group F ===
Pos	Team	Pld	W	D	L	GF	GA	GD	Pts	Qualification	VER	APS	ERM	ERG
1	Veria	3	2	1	0	7	2	+5	7	Round of 16		1–1	4–1	—
2	Apollon Smyrnis	3	1	2	0	4	3	+1	5	Round of 16	—		—	2–2
3	Ermionida	3	1	0	2	3	5	−2	3		—	0–1		2–0
4	Ergotelis	3	0	1	2	2	6	−4	1		0–2	—	—	

Source: epo.gr
24 September 2014
16:30 EEST

Apollon Smyrnis	2–2	Ergotelis
Kotsonis 57'; Angulo 70'	Report	Koutris 36'; Kozoronis 90+4'

Georgios Kamaras Stadium, Rizoupoli
Referee: Giorgos Daskalopoulos (Corinthia)
24 September 2014
16:30 EEST

Veria	4–1	Ermionida
Dumitru 16', 28'; Cámpora 70'; Georgiadis 76'	Report	Vlachopoulos 72'

Veria Stadium, Veria
Referee: Vangelis Kiotzenis (Thrace)

29 October 2014
15:00 EET

Ergotelis	0–2	Veria
	Report	Vergonis 10'; Bargan 64'

Pankritio Stadium, Heraklion
Referee: Kostas Ioannidis (Argolida)
30 October 2014
15:00 EET

Ermionida	0–1	Apollon Smyrnis
	Report	Wanderson 90'

Kranidi Municipal Stadium, Kranidi
Referee: Evangelos Kordolemis (East Attica)

7 January 2015
15:00 EET

Ermionida	2–0	Ergotelis
Staikos 4'; Koutsospyros 37'	Report

Kranidi Municipal Stadium, Kranidi
Referee: Ilias Spathas (Piraeus)
7 January 2015
15:00 EET

Veria	1–1	Apollon Smyrnis
Hasselbaink 78'	Report	Alípio 22'

Veria Stadium, Veria
Referee: Gerasimos Ditsos (Preveza)

=== Group G ===
Pos	Team	Pld	W	D	L	GF	GA	GD	Pts	Qualification	AST	TYR	KAL	AIG
1	Asteras Tripolis	3	2	1	0	7	3	+4	7	Round of 16		—	2–1	—
2	Tyrnavos	3	1	2	0	4	3	+1	5	Round of 16	1–1		—	2–1
3	Kalloni	3	1	1	1	7	3	+4	4		—	1–1		5–0
4	Aiginiakos	3	0	0	3	2	11	−9	0		1–4	—	—	

Source: epo.gr
24 September 2014
16:30 EEST

Kalloni	1–1	Tyrnavos
Manousos 19' (pen.)	Report	Milutinović 43'

Mytilene Municipal Stadium, Mytilene
Referee: Konstantinos Kotsanis (Drama)
24 September 2014
16:30 EEST

Aiginiakos	1–4	Asteras Tripolis
Penta 28'	Report	Barrales 32' (pen.); Tsokanis 38'; Gianniotas 72', 78'

Aiginio Municipal Stadium, Aiginio
Referee: Praxitelis Zachariadis (Macedonia)

28 October 2014
15:00 EET

Tyrnavos	2–1	Aiginiakos
Otta 45', 72'	Report	Demirtzoglou 58'

Alcazar Stadium, Larissa
Referee: Ioannis Blounas (Phthiotis)
29 October 2014
17:15 EET

Asteras Tripolis	2–1	Kalloni
Fernández 68', 77'	Report	Agritis 40' (pen.)

Theodoros Kolokotronis Stadium, Tripoli
Referee: Alexandros Aretopoulos (Trikala)

7 January 2015
15:00 EET

Tyrnavos	1–1	Asteras Tripolis
Karamanlis 37'	Report	Moukam 45+1'

Alcazar Stadium, Larissa
Referee: Giannis Kabaxis (Euboea)
7 January 2015
15:00 EET

Kalloni	5–0	Aiginiakos
Camara 3', 75'; Vlastellis 37'; Agritis 53'; Xydas 89'	Report

Mytilene Municipal Stadium, Mytilene
Referee: Stavros Mantalos (Athens)

=== Group H ===
Pos	Team	Pld	W	D	L	GF	GA	GD	Pts	Qualification	PAO	CHA	OLV	PNT
1	Panathinaikos	3	2	1	0	6	3	+3	7	Round of 16		—	—	3–1
2	Chania	3	1	2	0	3	2	+1	5	Round of 16	2–2		0–0	—
3	Olympiacos Volos	3	1	1	1	2	1	+1	4		0–1	—		—
4	Panetolikos	3	0	0	3	1	6	−5	0		—	0–1	0–2	

Source: epo.gr
24 September 2014
19:00 EEST

Olympiacos Volos	0–1	Panathinaikos
	Report	Ajagun 18'

Volos Municipal Stadium, Volos
Referee: Anastasios Sidiropoulos (Dodecanese)
25 September 2014
16:30 EEST

Panetolikos	0–1	Chania
	Report	Pangalos 51'

Panetolikos Stadium, Agrinio
Referee: Konstantinos Antoniou (Athens)

28 October 2014
15:00 EET

Chania	0–0	Olympiacos Volos
	Report

Perivolia Municipal Stadium, Chania
Referee: Nikos Papageorgiou (Athens)
30 October 2014
19:30 EET

Panathinaikos	3–1	Panetolikos
Klonaridis 49'; Bouy 58'; Berg 84'	Report	Koutromanos 62'

Leoforos Alexandras Stadium, Ampelokipoi
Referee: Giorgos Daskalopoulos (Corinthia)

8 January 2015
19:30 EET

Chania	2–2	Panathinaikos
Kritikos 75'; Pangalos 84'	Report	Ninis 17'; Klonaridis 29'

Perivolia Municipal Stadium, Chania
Referee: Athanasios Giachos (Chios)
8 January 2015
19:30 EET

Panetolikos	0–2	Olympiacos Volos
	Report	Bitang 16'; Diamantopoulos 34'

Panetolikos Stadium, Agrinio
Referee: Alexandros Katsikogiannis (Epirus)

== Knockout phase ==
Each tie in the knockout phase, apart from the final, was played over two legs, with each team playing one leg at home. The team that scored more goals on aggregate over the two legs advanced to the next round. If the aggregate score was level, the away goals rule was applied, i.e. the team that scored more goals away from home over the two legs advanced. If away goals were also equal, then extra time was played. The away goals rule was again applied after extra time, i.e. if there were goals scored during extra time and the aggregate score was still level, the visiting team advanced by virtue of more away goals scored. If no goals were scored during extra time, the winners were decided by a penalty shoot-out. In the final, which were played as a single match, if the score was level at the end of normal time, extra time was played, followed by a penalty shoot-out if the score was still level.
The mechanism of the draws for each round is as follows:

- In the draw for the round of 16, the eight group winners are seeded, and the eight group runners-up are unseeded.
  The seeded teams are drawn against the unseeded teams, with the seeded teams hosting the second leg.
- In the draws for the quarter-finals onwards, there are no seedings, and teams from the same group can be drawn against each other.

== Bracket ==
Round of 16
1	Chania (p)	1	2	3(5)
16	PAS Giannina	2	1	3(3)
8	Apollon Smyrnis	1	4	5
9	Levadiakos	1	1	2
5	Tyrnavos	0	0	0
12	Olympiacos	3	8	11
4	Kerkyra	1	0	1
13	AEK Athens	1	2	3
6	Iraklis	1	1	2
11	Asteras Tripolis	1	0	1
3	Panionios	2	1	3
14	Veria	1	1	2
7	Panthrakikos	0	0	0
10	OFI	4	1	5
2	Skoda Xanthi	1	1	2
15	Panathinaikos	1	0	1

Quarter-finals
Chania	1	1	2
Apollon Smyrnis	1	3	4
Olympiacos (w/o)	1	3	4
AEK Athens	1	0	1
Iraklis (p)	2	0	2(4)
Panionios	0	2	2(3)
OFI	1	0	1
Skoda Xanthi	1	3	4

Semi-finals
Apollon Smyrnis	0	1	1
Olympiacos	3	1	4
Iraklis	0	0	0
Skoda Xanthi	1	0	1

Final
Olympiacos	3
Skoda Xanthi	1

== Round of 16 ==
The draw for this round took place on 9 January 2015.

=== Seeding ===
Seeded teams
Team
Olympiacos
PAS Giannina
OFI
Levadiakos
AEK Athens
Veria
Asteras Tripolis
Panathinaikos

Unseeded teams
Team
Panionios
Kerkyra
Skoda Xanthi
Iraklis
Panthrakikos
Apollon Smyrnis
Tyrnavos
Chania

=== Summary ===
Team 1	Agg.	Team 2	1st leg	2nd leg
Panionios	3–2	Veria	2–1	1–1
Panthrakikos	0–5	OFI	0–4	0–1
Iraklis	2–1	Asteras Tripolis	1–1	1–0
Apollon Smyrnis	5–2	Levadiakos	1–1	4–1
Chania	3–3 (5–3 p)	PAS Giannina	1–2	2–1 (a.e.t.)
Tyrnavos	0–11	Olympiacos	0–3	0–8
Skoda Xanthi	2–1	Panathinaikos	1–1	1–0
Kerkyra	1–3	AEK Athens	1–1	0–2

=== Matches ===
20 January 2015
19:30 EET

Panionios	2–1	Veria
Oikonomou 62'; Kolovos 71'	Report	Cámpora 2'

Nea Smyrni Stadium, Nea Smyrni
Referee: Praxitelis Zachariadis (Macedonia)
28 January 2015
15:00 EET

Veria	1–1	Panionios
Kaltsas 85'	Report	Masouras 80'

Veria Stadium, Veria
Referee: Stavros Mantalos (Athens)

Panionios won 3–2 on aggregate.

22 January 2015
15:00 EET

Panthrakikos	0–4	OFI
	Report	Lampropoulos 19'; Merebashvili 27'; George 30', 57'

Komotini Municipal Stadium, Komotini
Referee: Giorgos Kominis (Thesprotia)
27 January 2015
15:00 EET

OFI	1–0	Panthrakikos
Lampropoulos 13'	Report

Theodoros Vardinogiannis Stadium, Heraklion
Referee: Giorgos Liachoudis (Macedonia)

OFI won 5–0 on aggregate.

21 January 2015
17:15 EET

Iraklis	1–1	Asteras Tripolis
Kyriakidis 79'	Report	Goian 49'

Kaftanzoglio Stadium, Thessaloniki
Referee: Stavros Mantalos (Athens)
27 January 2015
19:30 EET

Asteras Tripolis	0–1	Iraklis
	Report	Romano 56'

Theodoros Kolokotronis Stadium, Tripoli
Referee: Dimitrios Thanos (Grevena)

Iraklis won 2–1 on aggregate.

21 January 2015
19:30 EET

Apollon Smyrnis	1–1	Levadiakos
Karademitros 13' (pen.)	Report	Milhazes 20' (pen.)

Georgios Kamaras Stadium, Rizoupoli
Referee: Dimitrios Styliaras (Aetoloacarnania)
27 January 2015
17:15 EET

Levadiakos	1–4	Apollon Smyrnis
Mantzios 18'	Report	Chatzis 17'; Kotsonis 19'; Arsić 57'; Angulo 89'

Levadia Municipal Stadium, Levadia
Referee: Marios Lampropoulos (Elis)

Apollon Smyrnis won 5–2 on aggregate.

21 January 2015
15:00 EET

Chania	1–2	PAS Giannina
Soukias 89'	Report	Kritikos 37' Acosta 69'

Perivolia Municipal Stadium, Chania
Referee: Giannis Kabaxis (Euboea)
28 January 2015
17:15 EET

PAS Giannina	1–2 (a.e.t.)	Chania
Sapalidis 39'	Report	Kritikos 53'; Gotovos 85'
Penalties
Manias (penalty missed); Dasios (penalty scored); Nadales (penalty scored); Tzimopoulos (penalty scored)	3–5	(penalty scored) Kritikos; (penalty scored) Gotovos; (penalty scored) González; (penalty scored) Konteon; (penalty scored) Pangalos

Zosimades Stadium, Ioannina
Referee: Aristomenis Koutsiaftis (Arta)

Chania won 5–3 on penalties.

21 January 2015
17:15 EET

Tyrnavos	0–3	Olympiacos
	Report	Benítez 3', 26'; Milivojević 84'

Alcazar Stadium, Larissa
Referee: Marios Lampropoulos (Elis)
28 January 2015
19:30 EET

Olympiacos	8–0	Tyrnavos
Milivojević 9', 25'; Diamantakos 11'; Bouchalakis 17'; Durmaz 55', 57', 82'; Fuster 85' (pen.)	Report

Karaiskakis Stadium, Piraeus
Referee: Georgios Kominis (Thesprotia)

Olympiacos won 11–0 on aggregate.

21 January 2015
15:00 EET

Skoda Xanthi	1–1	Panathinaikos
Lucero 43'	Report	Karelis 87'

Skoda Xanthi Arena, Xanthi
Referee: Andreas Pappas (Athens)
29 January 2015
19:00 EET

Panathinaikos	0–1	Skoda Xanthi
	Report	Vasilakakis 88'

Leoforos Alexandras Stadium, Ampelokipoi
Referee: Anastasios Sidiropoulos (Dodecanese)

Skoda Xanthi won 2–1 on aggregate.

21 January 2015
17:45 EET

Kerkyra	1–1	AEK Athens
Venetis 58'	Report	Fábio 68' (o.g.)

Kerkyra Stadium, Corfu
Attendance: 2,000
Referee: Anastasios Papapetrou (Athens)
29 January 2015
17:00 EET

AEK Athens	2–0	Kerkyra
Mantalos 51'; Aravidis 82'	Report

Olympic Stadium, Marousi
Attendance: 9,795
Referee: Stavros Tritsonis (Athens)

AEK Athens won 3–1 on aggregate.

== Quarter-finals ==
The draw for this round took place on 30 January 2015.

=== Summary ===
Team 1	Agg.	Team 2	1st leg	2nd leg
Chania	2–4	Apollon Smyrnis	1–1	1–3
OFI	1–4	Skoda Xanthi	1–1	0–3
Iraklis	2–2 (4–3 p)	Panionios	2–0	0–2
Olympiacos	4–1	AEK Athens	1–1	3–0 (w/o)

=== Matches ===
12 February 2015
15:00 EET

Chania	1–1	Apollon Smyrnis
Kritikos 81'	Report	Souanis 76' (pen.)

Perivolia Municipal Stadium, Chania
Referee: Aristeidis Vatsios (West Attica)
5 March 2015
16:00 EET

Apollon Smyrnis	3–1	Chania
Angulo 39'; Farinola 59'; Souanis 66'	Report	Kritikos 43'

Georgios Kamaras Stadium, Rizoupoli
Referee: Marios Lampropoulos (Elis)

Apollon Smyrnis won 4–2 on aggregate.

12 February 2015
19:30 EET

OFI	1–1	Skoda Xanthi
Koutsianikoulis 48'	Report	Soltani 53'

Theodoros Vardinogiannis Stadium, Heraklion
Referee: Christos Mitsios (Epirus)
5 March 2015
19:30 EET

Skoda Xanthi	3–0	OFI
Soltani 18', 85'; Cleyton 26' (pen.)	Report

Skoda Xanthi Arena, Xanthi
Referee: Andreas Pappas (Athens)

Skoda Xanthi won 4–1 on aggregate.

11 February 2015
16:00 EET

Iraklis	2–0	Panionios
Korbos 15' (o.g.); Romano 74'	Report

Kaftanzoglio Stadium, Thessaloniki
Referee: Aristomenis Koutsiaftis (Arta)
4 March 2015
19:00 EET

Panionios	2–0 (a.e.t.)	Iraklis
Kolovos 19' (pen.); Boumale 45+2'	Report
Penalties
Oikonomou (penalty missed); Gezos (penalty scored); Fountas (penalty scored); Giannou (penalty scored); Kolovos (penalty missed); Korbos (penalty missed)	3–4	(penalty missed) Romano; (penalty scored) Kyriakidis; (penalty scored) Huanderson; (penalty missed) Ziabaris; (penalty scored) Pourtoulidis; (penalty scored) Tsilianidis

Nea Smyrni Stadium, Nea Smyrni
Referee: Stefanos Mantakis (Imathia)

Iraklis won 4–3 on penalties.

11 February 2015
19:30 EET

Olympiakos	1–1	AEK Athens
Milivojević 48'	Report	Aravidis 14'

Karaiskakis Stadium, Piraeus
Attendance: 30,000
Referee: Marios Lampropoulos (Elis)
11 March 2015
19:00 EET

AEK Athens	0–3 (Awarded)	Olympiakos
	Report	Jara 89'

Olympic Stadium, Marousi
Attendance: 64,256
Referee: Charalampos Kalogeropoulos (Athens)

Match suspended at 90th minute while the score was 0–1.

Olympiacos won 4–1 on aggregate.

== Semi-finals ==
The draw for this round took place on 17 March 2015.

=== Summary ===
Team 1	Agg.	Team 2	1st leg	2nd leg
Apollon Smyrnis	1–4	Olympiacos	0–3	1–1
Iraklis	0–1	Skoda Xanthi	0–1	0–0

=== Matches ===
8 April 2015
19:00 EEST

Apollon Smyrnis	0–3	Olympiacos
	Report	Dossevi 20', 57'; Jara 25'

Georgios Kamaras Stadium, Rizoupoli
Referee: Georgios Kyzas (Drama)
29 April 2015
18:30 EEST

Olympiacos	1–1	Apollon Smyrnis
Benítez 84'	Report	Angulo 43'

Karaiskakis Stadium, Piraeus
Referee: Stavros Tritsonis (Athens)

Olympiacos won 4–1 on aggregate.

9 April 2015
17:00 EEST

Iraklis	0–1	Skoda Xanthi
	Report	Cleyton 7'

Kaftanzoglio Stadium, Thessaloniki
Referee: Christos Mitsios (Epirus)
29 April 2015
21:30 EEST

Skoda Xanthi	0–0	Iraklis
	Report

Skoda Xanthi Arena, Xanthi
Referee: Dimitrios Styliaras (Aetoloacarnania)

Skoda Xanthi won 1–0 on aggregate.

== Final ==
23 May 2015
20:30 EEST

Olympiacos	3–1	Skoda Xanthi
Jara 45+1'; Domínguez 63'; Fortounis 80'	Report	Kapetanos 87'

Olympic Stadium, Marousi
Attendance: 26,300
Referee: Michael Koukoulakis (Heraklion)

== Top scorers ==
Rank	Player	Club	Goals
1	(Spain) Igor Angulo	Apollon Smyrnis	6
2	(Greece) Stelios Kritikos	Chania	5
3	(Greece) Dimitris Kolovos	Panionios	4
3	(Serbia) Luka Milivojević	Olympiacos	4
3	(Algeria) Karim Soltani	Skoda Xanthi	4
6	(Costa Rica) Mayron George	OFI	3
6	(Argentina) Franco Jara	Olympiacos	3
6	(Paraguay) Jorge Benítez	Olympiacos	3
6	(Greece) Mattheos Maroukakis	Panachaiki	3
6	(Sweden) Jimmy Durmaz	Olympiacos	3
6	(Greece) Christos Aravidis	AEK Athens	3
6	(Greece) Konstantinos Pangalos	Chania	3
6	(Greece) Kostas Fortounis	Olympiacos	3
