= 2015–16 Greek Football Cup =

2015–16 Greek Cup

Tournament details
- Country: Greece
- Teams: 34

Final positions
- Champions: AEK Athens (15th title)
- Runners-up: Olympiacos

Tournament statistics
- Matches played: 80
- Goals scored: 208 (2.6 per match)
- Top goal scorer(s): Diego Buonanotte (5 goals)

The 2015–16 Greek Football Cup was the 74th edition of the Greek Football Cup. A total of 34 clubs were accepted to enter. The competition commenced on 9 September 2015 with the preliminary round and was planned to conclude on 23 April 2016 with the final, at the Olympic Stadium.

The cup was cancelled by the Greek government on 3 March 2016, following crowd violence. On 5 April 2016, FIFA Emergency Committee decided to provide the Greek authorities with a deadline to have the cancellation of the competition reversed before 15 April 2016 or the Hellenic Football Federation would face an automatic suspension. The Greek authorities announced on deadline day that the Greek Football Cup will be resumed after an agreement reached with FIFA, UEFA and Hellenic Football Federation.

A new schedule with the remaining match was announced with the final being played on 7 May 2016, but the final was later postponed to 17 May 2016.AEK Athens won the trophy with a 2–1 win over Olympiacos.

== Teams ==
Round	Clubs remaining	Clubs involved	Winners from previous round	New entries	Leagues entering
Preliminary round	34	4	none	4	Football League
Group Stage	32	32	2	30	Super League
Round of 16	16	16	16	none	none
Quarter-finals	8	8	8	none	none
Semi-finals	4	4	4	none	none
Final	2	2	2	none	none

== Calendar ==
Round	Date(s)	Fixtures	Clubs	New entries
Preliminary round	9, 10, 16 September 2015	4	34 → 32	4
Group Stage	27–29 October, 1–3 & 15–17 December 2015	48	32 → 16	30
Round of 16	5–7, 12–14 January 2016	16	16 → 8	none
Quarter-finals	27, 28 January & 3, 4, 10, 11 February 2016	8	8 → 4	none
Semi-finals	2 March, 20, 26, 27 April 2016	3	4 → 2	none
Final	17 May 2016	1	2 → 1	none

== Participating clubs ==
2015–16 Super League	2015–16 Football League
AEK Athens; AEL Kalloni; Asteras Tripolis; Atromitos; Iraklis; Levadiakos; Olympiacos; Panathinaikos; Panetolikos; Panionios; Panthrakikos; PAOK; PAS Giannina; Platanias; Skoda Xanthi; Veria	Acharnaikos; AEL; Agrotikos Asteras; Anagennisi Karditsa; Apollon Smyrnis; Chania; Ergotelis; Kallithea; Kerkyra; Kissamikos; Lamia; Olympiacos Volos; Panachaiki; Panegialios; Panelefsiniakos; Panserraikos; Trikala; Zakynthos

== Preliminary round ==
The draw for this round took place on 4 September 2015.

=== Summary ===
Team 1	Agg.	Team 2	1st leg	2nd leg
Agrotikos Asteras	0–2	Kallithea	0–0	0–2
Acharnaikos	1–0	Trikala	1–0	0–0

=== Matches ===
9 September 2015
16:00 EEST

Agrotikos Asteras	0–0	Kallithea
	Report

Agrotikos Asteras Stadium, Euboea
Referee: Dionysis Zougras (Kozani)
10 September 2015
16:00 EEST

Kallithea	2–0	Agrotikos Asteras
Arnarellis 43'; Frangos 60'	Report

Peristeri Stadium, Peristeri
Referee: Georgios Foukakis (Heraklion)

Kallithea won 2–0 on aggregate.

10 September 2015
16:00 EEST

Acharnaikos	1–0	Trikala
Obradović 34'	Report

Acharnes Stadium, Acharnes
Referee: Aristotelis Diamantopoulos (Arcadia)
16 September 2015
16:00 EEST

Trikala	0–0	Acharnaikos
	Report

Trikala Municipal Stadium, Trikala
Referee: Nikolaos Poulimas (Corfu)

Acharnaikos won 1–0 on aggregate.

== Group stage ==
The draw for this round took place on 17 September 2015.

Pot 1 (Super League)
Team
Olympiacos
Panathinaikos
Asteras Tripolis
Atromitos
PAOK
PAS Giannina
Panetolikos
Skoda Xanthi

Pot 2 (Super League)
Team
Platanias
Kalloni
Panthrakikos
Panionios
Veria
Levadiakos
AEK Athens
Iraklis

Pot 3 (Football League)
Team
AEL
Panegialios
Ergotelis
Kissamikos
Lamia
Acharnaikos
Panachaiki
Chania

Pot 4 (Football League)
Team
Panelefsiniakos
Apollon Smyrnis
Zakynthos
Panserraikos
Kallithea
Anagennisi Karditsa
Kerkyra
Olympiacos Volos

=== Group A ===
Pos	Team	Pld	W	D	L	GF	GA	GD	Pts	Qualification	IRA	PAS	ACH	KRD
1	Iraklis	3	2	1	0	7	1	+6	7	Round of 16		—	—	4–0
2	PAS Giannina	3	1	2	0	3	2	+1	5	Round of 16	1–1		—	—
3	Acharnaikos	3	1	0	2	2	4	−2	3		0–2	1–2		—
4	Anagennisi Karditsa	3	0	1	2	0	5	−5	1		—	0–0	0–1	

Source: epo.gr
27 October 2015
17:15 EET

Anagennisi Karditsa	0–1	Acharnaikos
	Report	Ioannidis 77'

Municipal Stadium of Karditsa, Karditsa
Referee: Konstantinos Balatsoukas (Thesprotia)
29 October 2015
19:30 EET

PAS Giannina	1–1	Iraklis
Chávez 75'	Report	Loukinas 77'

Zosimades Stadium, Ioannina
Referee: Dimitris Karantonis (Imathia)

1 December 2015
15:00 EET

Acharnaikos	1–2	PAS Giannina
Kostopoulos 65'	Report	Giakos 50'; Sapalidis 89'

Acharnes Stadium, Acharnes
Referee: Vangelis Kiotzenis (Thrace)
1 December 2015
19:30 EET

Iraklis	4–0	Anagennisi Karditsa
Karasalidis 24'; Chanti 58'; Perrone 85', 86'	Report

Kaftanzoglio Stadium, Thessaloniki
Referee: Ananias Fotiadis (Serres)

15 December 2015
15:00 EET

Acharnaikos	0–2	Iraklis
	Report	Pasas 58'; Perrone 90+1'

Acharnes Stadium, Acharnes
Referee: Georgios Kominis (Thesprotia)
15 December 2015
15:00 EET

Anagennisi Karditsa	0–0	PAS Giannina
	Report

Municipal Stadium of Karditsa, Karditsa
Referee: Giorgos Kyzas (Drama)

=== Group B ===
Pos	Team	Pld	W	D	L	GF	GA	GD	Pts	Qualification	PGSS	ERG	ZAK	PNE
1	Panionios	3	3	0	0	5	2	+3	9	Round of 16		—	1–0	—
2	Ergotelis	3	1	1	1	6	6	0	4	Round of 16	1–2		—	3–2
3	Zakynthos	3	1	1	1	3	3	0	4		—	2–2		1–0
4	Panetolikos	3	0	0	3	3	6	−3	0		1–2	—	—	

Source: epo.gr
27 October 2015
15:00 EET

Zakynthos	2–2	Ergotelis
Vythoulkas 28', 49'	Report	Bourselis 71'; Injac 83'

Zakynthians Olympic Champions Ground, Zakynthos
Referee: Giorgos Michailidis (Boeotia)
28 October 2015
17:15 EET

Panetolikos	1–2	Panionios
Kappel 74'	Report	Ansarifard 10'; Chalkiadakis 31'

Panetolikos Stadium, Agrinio
Referee: Giorgos Kyzas (Drama)

1 December 2015
17:15 EET

Panionios	1–0	Zakynthos
Chalkiadakis 36'	Report

Nea Smyrni Stadium, Nea Smyrni
Referee: Spyros Stathopoulos (West Attica)
3 December 2015
15:00 EET

Ergotelis	3–2	Panetolikos
Camara 31'; Manos 44'; Injac 50'	Report	Vasileiou 49'; Villafáñez 72'

Theodoros Vardinogiannis Stadium, Heraklion
Referee: Ilias Spathas (Piraeus)

16 December 2015
15:00 EET

Ergotelis	1–2	Panionios
Dos Santos 54' (pen.)	Report	Katharios 38'; Villalba 75'

Pankritio Stadium, Heraklion
Referee: Ioannis Neofytiadis (Corinthia)
16 December 2015
15:00 EET

Zakynthos	1–0	Ergotelis
Kardasis 84'	Report

Zakynthians Olympic Champions Ground, Zakynthos
Referee: Aristotelis Diamantopoulos (Arcadia)

=== Group C ===
Pos	Team	Pld	W	D	L	GF	GA	GD	Pts	Qualification	PAOK	CHA	PTH	OLV
1	PAOK	3	2	1	0	9	3	+6	7	Round of 16		—	2–0	—
2	Chania	3	1	1	1	6	9	−3	4	Round of 16	2–6		2–2	—
3	Panthrakikos	3	1	1	1	3	4	−1	4		—	—		1–0
4	Olympiacos Volos	3	0	1	2	2	4	−2	1		1–1	1–2	—	

Source: epo.gr
28 October 2015
17:15 EET

PAOK	2–0	Panthrakikos
Pelkas 73'; Mak 86'	Report

Toumba Stadium, Thessaloniki
Referee: Anastasios Sidiropoulos (Dodecanese)
29 October 2015
15:00 EET

Olympiacos Volos	1–2	Chania
Skopelitis 44'	Report	Sanderson 70'; Lita 90'

Volos Municipal Stadium, Volos
Referee: Alexandros Tsamouris (Piraeus)

1 December 2015
15:00 EET

Panthrakikos	1–0	Olympiacos Volos
Mejía 44'	Report

Komotini Municipal Stadium, Komotini
Referee: Dimitris Karantonis (Imathia)
3 December 2015
17:15 EET

Chania	2–6	PAOK
Stamatis 3'; Lita 79'	Report	Jairo 73'; Sabo 23', 41', 85'; Mystakidis 61'; Pelkas 64'

Perivolia Municipal Stadium, Chania
Referee: Michael Koukoulakis (Heraklion)

17 December 2015
15:00 EET

Chania	2–2	Panthrakikos
Rikka 7'; Gesios 68'	Report	Psaltis 18'; Markopoulos 59'

Perivolia Municipal Stadium, Chania
Referee: Giannis Delfakis (Arcadia)
17 December 2015
15:00 EET

Olympiacos Volos	1–1	PAOK
Alamanis 32'	Report	Dimitriadis 16'

Volos Municipal Stadium, Volos
Referee: Spyros Stathopoulos (West Attica)

=== Group D ===
Pos	Team	Pld	W	D	L	GF	GA	GD	Pts	Qualification	PAO	LEV	KER	PNA
1	Panathinaikos	3	2	1	0	6	2	+4	7	Round of 16		3–0	—	—
2	Levadiakos	3	2	0	1	6	4	+2	6	Round of 16	—		2–0	—
3	Kerkyra	3	0	2	1	2	4	−2	2		1–1	—		1–1
4	Panachaiki	3	0	1	2	3	7	−4	1		1–2	1–4	—	

Source: epo.gr
27 October 2015
17:15 EET

Kerkyra	1–1	Panachaiki
Tavares 25'	Report	Pedro 64'

Kerkyra Stadium, Corfu
Referee: Fotis Fotiadis (Kastoria)
28 October 2015
17:15 EET

Panathinaikos	3–0	Levadiakos
Ninis 24' (pen.); Tavlaridis 27'; Klonaridis 77'	Report

Leoforos Alexandras Stadium, Ampelokipoi
Referee: Stavros Tritsonis (Athens)

2 December 2015
14:30 EET

Levadiakos	2–0	Kerkyra
Mantzios 53'; Giakoumakis 89'	Report

Levadia Municipal Stadium, Livadeia
Referee: Triantafyllos Tikas (Karditsa)
3 December 2015
19:30 EET

Panachaiki	1–2	Panathinaikos
Stergidis 90+1'	Report	Klonaridis 7', 42'

Pampeloponnisiako Stadium, Patras
Referee: Spyros Selimos (Laconia)

17 December 2015
17:00 EET

Panachaiki	1–4	Levadiakos
Stamatakos 58'	Report	Theos 29'; I. Marković 32'; Kapsaskis 86', 88'

Pampeloponnisiako Stadium, Patras
Referee: Michalis Voskakis (Rethymno)
17 December 2015
17:00 EET

Kerkyra	1–1	Panathinaikos
Vlachos 4'	Report	Klonaridis 90+4'

Kerkyra Stadium, Corfu
Referee: Alexandros Katsikogiannis (Epirus)

=== Group E ===
Pos	Team	Pld	W	D	L	GF	GA	GD	Pts	Qualification	OLY	PLA	APS	PEG
1	Olympiacos	3	2	1	0	8	3	+5	7	Round of 16		2–2	—	—
2	Platanias	3	1	1	1	5	4	+1	4	Round of 16	—		3–1	—
3	Apollon Smyrnis	3	1	0	2	5	6	−1	3		1–2	—		3–1
4	Panegialios	3	1	0	2	2	7	−5	3		0–4	1–0	—	

Source: epo.gr
28 October 2015
19:30 EET

Apollon Smyrnis	3–1	Panegialios
Fatjon 16'; Symelidis 54'; Parpeix 90'	Report	Krčmarević 35'

Georgios Kamaras Stadium, Rizoupoli
Referee: Manolis Skoulas (Thessaly)
28 October 2015
19:30 EET

Olympiacos	2–2	Platanias
Hernâni 47', 90+1'	Report	Ramos 78'; Banana 78'

Karaiskakis Stadium, Piraeus
Referee: Georgios Kominis (Thesprotia)

2 December 2015
16:00 EET

Platanias	3–1	Apollon Smyrnis
Pangalos 29'; Dinas 41'; Ramos 81'	Report	Parpeix 76'

Perivolia Municipal Stadium, Chania
Referee: Apostolos Simaiakis (Chalkidiki)
2 December 2015
19:30 EET

Panegialios	0–4	Olympiacos
	Report	Cambiasso 23'; Domínguez 41'; Kolovos 86'; Fuster 89'

Aigio National Stadium, Aigio
Referee: Alexandros Katsikogiannis (Epirus)

16 December 2015
19:30 EET

Panegialios	1–0	Platanias
Juninho 42'	Report

Aigio National Stadium, Aigio
Referee: Evangelos Gratsanis (Trikala)
16 December 2015
19:30 EET

Apollon Smyrnis	1–2	Olympiacos
Valerianos 53'	Report	Fuster 45', 85'

Georgios Kamaras Stadium, Rizoupoli
Referee: Andreas Pappas (Athens)

=== Group F ===
Pos	Team	Pld	W	D	L	GF	GA	GD	Pts	Qualification	ATR	VER	KLT	LAM
1	Atromitos	3	2	1	0	8	4	+4	7	Round of 16		2–2	—	—
2	Veria	3	2	1	0	4	2	+2	7	Round of 16	—		1–0	—
3	Kallithea	3	1	0	2	4	6	−2	3		2–4	—		2–1
4	Lamia	3	0	0	3	1	5	−4	0		0–2	0–1	—	

Source: epo.gr

27 October 2015
19:30 EET

Kallithea	2–1	Lamia
Smyrlis 20'; Bellis 86'	Report	Karalis 44'

Grigoris Lambrakis Stadium, Kallithea
Referee: Vasilis Fotias (Pella)
28 October 2015
15:00 EET

Atromitos	2–2	Veria
Kouros 84'; Lazaridis 88'	Report	Majewski 44'; Kajkut 52'

Peristeri Stadium, Peristeri
Referee: Aristidis Vatsios (West Attica)

1 December 2015
17:15 EET

Lamia	0–2	Atromitos
	Report	Napoleoni 58', 66' (pen.)

Lamia Municipal Stadium, Lamia
Referee: Georgios Foukakis (Heraklion)
3 December 2015
15:00 EET

Veria	1–0	Kallithea
Battión 17'	Report

Veria Stadium, Veria
Referee: Evangelos Gratsanis (Trikala)

16 December 2015
17:15 EET

Lamia	0–1	Veria
	Report	Majewski 6'

Lamia Municipal Stadium, Lamia
Referee: Christos Mitsios (Epirus)
16 December 2015
17:15 EET

Kallithea	2–4	Atromitos
Arnarellis 41' (pen.); Macena 51'	Report	Kouros 18'; Le Tallec 37'; Brito 52'; Napoleoni 68' (pen.)

Grigoris Lambrakis Stadium, Kallithea
Referee: Stavros Mantalos (Athens)

=== Group G ===
Pos	Team	Pld	W	D	L	GF	GA	GD	Pts	Qualification	AEK	AEL	SKO	PNF
1	AEK Athens	3	3	0	0	12	0	+12	9	Round of 16		—	—	6–0
2	AEL	3	2	0	1	5	6	−1	6	Round of 16	0–5		1–0	—
3	Skoda Xanthi	3	1	0	2	5	2	+3	3		0–1	—		—
4	Panelefsiniakos	3	0	0	3	1	15	−14	0		—	1–4	0–5	

Source: epo.gr
28 October 2015
15:30 EET

Skoda Xanthi	0–1	AEK Athens
	Report	Chrisantus 51'

Skoda Xanthi Arena, Xanthi
Attendance: 500
Referee: Giannis Delfakis (Arcadia)
29 October 2015
17:15 EET

Panelefsiniakos	1–4	AEL
Kakaras 48'	Report	Kritikos 22'; Kapos 46', 78'; Souliotis 68'

Municipal Stadium of Elefsina, Elefsina
Referee: Andreas Gamaris (Athens)

2 December 2015
15:00 EET

AEL	1–0	Skoda Xanthi
Bojović 34'	Report

AEL FC Arena, Larissa
Referee: Ioannis Papadopoulos (Macedonia)
2 December 2015
17:15 EET

AEK Athens	6–0	Panelefsiniakos
Platellas 8'; Johansson 27'; Buonaotte 31', 81'; Soiledis 45+1'; Aravidis 78'	Report

Olympic Stadium, Marousi
Attendance: 2,160
Referee: Aristotelis Diamantopoulos (Arcadia)

17 December 2015
19:30 EET

AEL	0–5	AEK Athens
	Report	Djebbour 18'; Buonanotte 41', 54'; Vargas 88'; Mantalos 89'

AEL FC Arena, Larissa
Attendance: Behind closed doors
Referee: Athanasios Sezos (Kilkis)
17 December 2015
19:30 EET

Panelefsiniakos	0–5	Skoda Xanthi
	Report	Kapetanos 43'; Herea 51' (pen.), 82'; Chris 80', 88'

Municipal Stadium of Elefsina, Elefsina
Referee: Ioannis Mourtzakis (Heraklion)

=== Group H ===
Pos	Team	Pld	W	D	L	GF	GA	GD	Pts	Qualification	AST	KAL	KIS	PSE
1	Asteras Tripolis	3	3	0	0	8	1	+7	9	Round of 16		4–0	—	—
2	Kalloni	3	2	0	1	4	6	−2	6	Round of 16	—		—	2–1
3	Kissamikos	3	0	1	2	2	5	−3	1		1–3	1–2		—
4	Panserraikos	3	0	1	2	1	3	−2	1		0–1	—	0–0	

Source: epo.gr
Rules for classification: 1. Points 2. Head-to-head points 3. Goals scored 4. Goals against 5. Play-offs (neutral ground).
27 October 2015
15:00 EET

Panserraikos	0–0	Kissamikos
	Report

Serres Municipal Stadium, Serres
Referee: Evangelos Gratsanis (Trikala)
28 October 2015
19:30 EET

Asteras Tripolis	4–0	Kalloni
Lanzarote 21'; Shkurti 49', 71'; Fernández 87'	Report

Theodoros Kolokotronis Stadium, Tripoli
Referee: Marios Lampropoulos (Elis)

2 December 2015
15:00 EET

Kissamikos	1–3	Asteras Tripolis
Mantzis 75'	Report	Kitoko 56'; Moukam 62'; Fernández 90+4'

Gallos Stadium, Lappa
Referee: Aristeidis Vatsios (West Attica)
3 December 2015
15:00 EET

Kalloni	2–1	Panserraikos
Bargan 55'; Georgiou 85'	Report	Popovits 15'

Mytilene Municipal Stadium, Mytilene
Referee: Christos Granas (Xanthi)

16 December 2015
15:00 EET

Kissamikos	1–2	Kalloni
Posinković 35'	Report	M. Marković 66'; Manousos 90+2' (pen.)

Maleme Stadium, Chania
Referee: Michael Koukoulakis (Heraklion)
16 December 2015
15:00 EET

Panserraikos	0–1	Asteras Tripolis
	Report	Fountas 35'

Serres Municipal Stadium, Serres
Referee: Fotis Fotiadis (Kastoria)

== Knockout phase ==
Each tie in the knockout phase, apart from the final, was played over two legs, with each team playing one leg at home. The team that scored more goals on aggregate over the two legs advanced to the next round. If the aggregate score was level, the away goals rule was applied, i.e. the team that scored more goals away from home over the two legs advanced. If away goals were also equal, then extra time was played. The away goals rule was again applied after extra time, i.e. if there were goals scored during extra time and the aggregate score was still level, the visiting team advanced by virtue of more away goals scored. If no goals were scored during extra time, the winners were decided by a penalty shoot-out. In the final, which were played as a single match, if the score was level at the end of normal time, extra time was played, followed by a penalty shoot-out if the score was still level.
The mechanism of the draws for each round is as follows:

- In the draw for the round of 16, the eight group winners are seeded, and the eight group runners-up are unseeded.
  The seeded teams are drawn against the unseeded teams, with the seeded teams hosting the second leg.
- In the draws for the quarter-finals onwards, there are no seedings, and teams from the same group can be drawn against each other.

== Bracket ==
Round of 16
1	Ergotelis	0	0	0
16	Panionios	1	1	2
8	Kalloni	2	0	2
9	PAOK	1	3	4
5	Chania	1	0	1
12	Olympiacos	4	6	10
4	AEL	0	0	0
13	Asteras Tripolis	3	3	6
6	Levadiakos	0	0	0
11	AEK Athens	1	2	3
3	Veria	0	0	0
14	Iraklis	1	1	2
7	PAS Giannina	1	1	2
10	Panathinaikos (a)	2	0	2
2	Platanias	0	1	1
15	Atromitos	0	2	2

Quarter-finals
Panionios	1	0	1
PAOK (a)	1	0	1
Olympiacos	5	1	6
Asteras Tripolis	0	1	1
AEK Athens	4	1	5
Iraklis	1	0	1
Panathinaikos	0	0	0
Atromitos	0	1	1

Semi-finals
PAOK	0	0	0
Olympiacos (w/o)	3	3	6
AEK Athens	1	1	2
Atromitos	0	1	1

Final
Olympiacos	1
AEK Athens	2

== Round of 16 ==
The draw for this round took place on 18 December 2015.

=== Seeding ===
Seeded teams Team Iraklis Panionios PAOK Panathinaikos Olympiacos Atromitos AEK Athens Asteras Tripolis	Unseeded teams Team PAS Giannina Ergotelis Chania Levadiakos Platanias Veria AEL Kalloni

=== Summary ===
Team 1	Agg.	Team 2	1st leg	2nd leg
Ergotelis	0–2	Panionios	0–1	0–1
Platanias	1–2	Atromitos	0–0	1–2
Chania	1–10	Olympiacos	1–4	0–6
PAS Giannina	2–2 (a)	Panathinaikos	1–2	1–0
Levadiakos	0–3	AEK Athens	0–1	0–2
AEL	0–6	Asteras Tripolis	0–3	0–3
Kalloni	2–4	PAOK	2–1	0–3
Veria	0–2	Iraklis	0–1	0–1

=== Matches ===
6 January 2016
17:15 EET

Ergotelis	0–1	Panionios
	Report	Karamanos 17'

Pankritio Stadium, Heraklion
Referee: Spyros Selimos (Laconia)
14 January 2016
15:00 EET

Panionios	1–0	Ergotelis
Bakasetas 21'	Report

Nea Smyrni Stadium, Nea Smyrni
Referee: Athanasios Sezos (Kilkis)

Panionios won 2–0 on aggregate.

6 January 2016
15:00 EET

Platanias	0–0	Atromitos
	Report

Perivolia Municipal Stadium, Chania
Referee: Ioannis Papadopoulos (Macedonia)
12 January 2016
19:30 EET

Atromitos	2–1	Platanias
	Report

Peristeri Stadium, Peristeri
Referee: Alexandros Aretopoulos (Trikala)

Atromitos won 2–1 on aggregate.

7 January 2016
17:15 EET

Chania	1–4	Olympiacos
Gesios 8'	Report	Hernâni 22'; Kolovos 39'; Sebá 86'; Maniatis 90'

Perivolia Municipal Stadium, Chania
Referee: Anastasios Sidiropoulos (Dodecanese)
13 January 2016
19:30 EET

Olympiacos	6–0	Chania
Zdjelar 4'; Kasami 11', 45'; Sebá 36'; Pulido 73'; Fuster 90'	Report

Karaiskakis Stadium, Piraeus
Referee: Alexandros Katsikogiannis (Epirus)

Olympiacos won 10–1 on aggregate.

7 January 2016
15:00 EET

PAS Giannina	1–2	Panathinaikos
Acosta 57'	Report	Abeid 75'; Petrić 78'

Zosimades Stadium, Ioannina
Referee: Stavros Mantalos (Athens)
14 January 2016
19:30 EET

Panathinaikos	0–1	PAS Giannina
	Report	Ferfelis 90+3'

Leoforos Alexandras Stadium, Ampelokipoi
Referee: Dimitrios Karantonis (Imathia)

Panathinaikos won on away goals.

6 January 2016
17:15 EET

Levadiakos	0–1	AEK Athens
	Report	Vargas 30'

Levadia Municipal Stadium, Livadeia
Referee: Athanasios Giachos (Chios)
13 January 2016
17:15 EET

AEK Athens	2–0	Levadiakos
Johansson 44'; Buonanotte 85'	Report

Olympic Stadium, Marousi
Referee: Anastasios Sidiropoulos (Dodecanese)

AEK Athens won 3–0 on aggregate.

5 January 2016
17:15 EET

AEL	0–3	Asteras Tripolis
	Report	Stanisavljević 13'; Hamdani 28'; Mazza 85'

Pankritio Stadium, Heraklion
Referee: Triantafyllos Tikas (Karditsa)
13 January 2016
17:15 EET

Asteras Tripolis	3–0	AEL
Giannoulis 18'; Fountas 64'; Moukam 90'	Report

Nea Smyrni Stadium, Nea Smyrni
Referee: Fotis Fotiadis (Kastoria)

Asteras Tripolis won 6–0 on aggregate.

6 January 2016
19:30 EET

Kalloni	2–1	PAOK
Anastasiadis 3'; Georgiou 79'	Report	Mak 89'

Mytilene Municipal Stadium, Mytilene
Referee: Dimitrios Karantonis (Imathia)
14 January 2016
17:15 EET

PAOK	3–0	Kalloni
Mak 65'; Athanasiadis 58'; Berbatov 86'	Report

Toumba Stadium, Thessaloniki
Referee: Georgios Kominis (Thesprotia)

PAOK won 4–2 on aggregate.

5 January 2016
19:30 EET

Veria	0–1	Iraklis
	Report	Bartolini 73'

Veria Stadium, Veria
Referee: Dimitrios Thanos (Grevena)
13 January 2016
15:00 EET

Iraklis	1–0	Veria
Vellios 72'	Report

Kaftanzoglio Stadium, Thessaloniki
Referee: Athanasios Tzilos (Larissa)

Iraklis won 2–0 on aggregate.

== Quarter-finals ==
The draw for this round took place on 15 January 2016.

=== Summary ===
Team 1	Agg.	Team 2	1st leg	2nd leg
Panionios	1–1 (a)	PAOK	1–1	0–0
Olympiacos	6–1	Asteras Tripolis	5–0	1–1
AEK Athens	5–1	Iraklis	4–1	1–0
Panathinaikos	0–1	Atromitos	0–0	0–1

=== Matches ===
27 January 2016
15:45 EET

Panionios	1–1	PAOK
Masouras 35'	Report	Pelkas 15'

Nea Smyrni Stadium, Nea Smyrni
Referee: Michalis Voskakis (Rethymnο)
11 February 2016
19:30 EET

PAOK	0–0	Panionios
	Report

Toumba Stadium, Thessaloniki
Referee: Athanasios Tzilos (Larissa)

PAOK won on away goals.

27 January 2016
19:30 EET

Olympiacos	5–0	Asteras Tripolis
Ideye 13', 41'; Fortounis 50', 64'; Pardo 79'	Report

Karaiskakis Stadium, Piraeus
Referee: Christos Mitsios (Epirus)
3 February 2016
19:30 EET

Asteras Tripolis	1–1	Olympiacos
Iglesias 20'	Report	da Costa 53'

Theodoros Kolokotronis Stadium, Tripoli
Referee: Angelos Evangelou (Athens)

Olympiacos won 6–1 on aggregate.

28 January 2016
19:30 EET

AEK Athens	4–1	Iraklis
Ziabaris 7' (o.g.); Kolovetsios 45+1'; Platellas 72'; Aravidis 85' (pen.)	Report	Vellios 90'

Olympic Stadium, Marousi
Referee: Giannis Delfakis (Arcadia)
4 February 2016
19:30 EET

Iraklis	0–1	AEK Athens
	Report	Mantalos 50'

Kaftanzoglio Stadium, Thessaloniki
Referee: Dimitris Thanos (Grevena)

AEK Athens won 5–1 on aggregate.

27 January 2016
17:15 EET

Panathinaikos	0–0	Atromitos
	Report

Leoforos Alexandras Stadium, Ampelokipoi
Referee: Dimitris Styliaras (Aetoloacarnania)
10 February 2016
19:30 EET

Atromitos	1–0	Panathinaikos
Stojčev 65'	Report

Peristeri Stadium, Peristeri
Referee: Christos Mitsios (Epirus)

Atromitos won 1–0 on aggregate.

== Semi-finals ==
The draw for this round took place on 19 February 2016. After the PAOK–Olympiacos match on 2 March being abandoned due to crowd violence, the Cup was cancelled, before being resumed on 15 April 2016. New dates for the competition were announced by Hellenic Football Federation and the other first leg match was played on 20 April while the second leg matches were played on 26 and 27 April 2016.

=== Summary ===
Team 1	Agg.	Team 2	1st leg	2nd leg
AEK Athens	2–1	Atromitos	1–0	1–1
PAOK	0–6	Olympiacos	0–3 (w/o)	0–3 (w/o)

=== Matches ===
20 April 2016
19:00 EEST

AEK Athens	1–0	Atromitos
Mantalos 73'	Report

Olympic Stadium, Marousi
Attendance: Behind closed doors
Referee: Alexis Aretopoulos (Trikala)
26 April 2016
18:00 EEST

Atromitos	1–1	AEK Athens
Brito 68' (pen.)	Report	Djebbour 88'

Peristeri Stadium, Peristeri
Attendance: Behind closed doors
Referee: Giorgos Kyzas (Drama)

AEK Athens won 2–1 on aggregate.

2 March 2016
19:30 EET

PAOK	0–3 (Awarded)	Olympiacos
Mak 9'	Report	Cambiasso 27'; Fuster 56'

Toumba Stadium, Thessaloniki
Referee: Andreas Pappas (Athens)

Match abandoned in the 90th minute with the score at 1–2. It was later awarded as a 0–3 win for Olympiacos.

27 April 2016
17:00 EEST

Olympiacos	3–0 (Awarded)	PAOK
	Report

Karaiskakis Stadium, Piraeus
Referee: Charalampos Kalogeropoulos (Athens)

PAOK didn't show up to the match.

Olympiacos won 6–0 on aggregate.

== Final ==
17 May 2016
20:30 EEST

Olympiacos	1–2	AEK Athens
Domínguez 84'	Report	Mantalos 38'; Djebbour 51'

Olympic Stadium, Marousi
Attendance: Behind closed doors
Referee: Anastasios Sidiropoulos (Dodecanese)

== Top scorers ==
Rank	Player	Club	Goals
1	(Argentina) Diego Buonanotte	AEK Athens	5
2	(Portugal) Hernâni	Olympiacos	4
2	(Italy) Stefano Napoleoni	Atromitos	4
2	(Belgium) Viktor Klonaridis	Panathinaikos	4
2	(Slovakia) Róbert Mak	PAOK	4
2	(Greece) Petros Mantalos	AEK Athens	4
2	(Spain) David Fuster	Olympiacos	4
8	(Argentina) Emanuel Perrone	Iraklis	3
8	(Argentina) Leonardo Ramos	Platanias	3
8	(Slovakia) Erik Sabo	PAOK	3
8	(Greece) Taxiarchis Fountas	Asteras Tripolis	3
8	(Greece) Dimitrios Pelkas	PAOK	3
8	(Algeria) Rafik Djebbour	AEK Athens	3
