= Andreas Gianniotis =

Greek footballer (born in 1992)

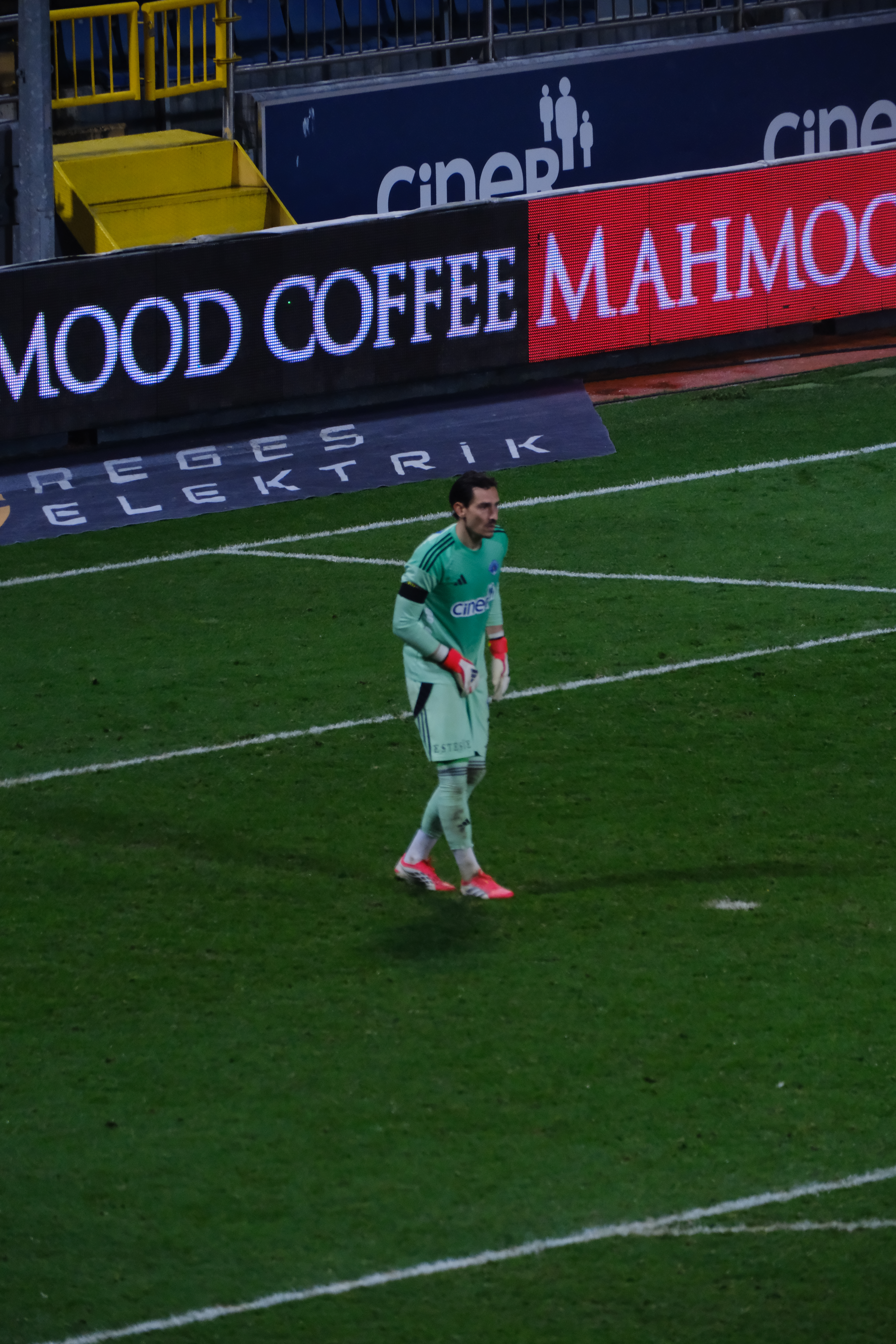
- Gianniotis with Kasimpaşa in 2026

Personal information
- Date of birth: 18 December 1992 (age 33)
- Place of birth: Serres, Greece
- Height: 1.90 m (6 ft 3 in)
- Position: Goalkeeper

Team information
- Current team: Kasimpasa
- Number: 1

Youth career
- 2005–2006: Iraklis
- 2006–2011: Apollon Kamarias

Senior career*
Years	Team	Apps	(Gls)
2011–2012	Ethnikos Gazoros	18	(0)
2012–2017	Olympiacos	0	(0)
2014	→ Fostiras (loan)	14	(0)
2014–2015	→ PAS Giannina (loan)	0	(0)
2015–2017	→ Panionios (loan)	36	(0)
2017–2018	Atromitos	26	(0)
2018–2019	Olympiacos	7	(0)
2019–2021	Maccabi Tel Aviv	3	(0)
2020–2021	→ Atromitos (loan)	18	(0)
2021–2023	Atromitos	52	(0)
2023–	Kasimpasa	97	(1)

International career^{‡}
2012–2013	Greece U21	4	(0)
2018	Greece	2	(0)
- * Club domestic league appearances and goals as of 10 May 2026 ‡ National team caps and goals as of 26 May 2018

Andreas Gianniotis (Greek: Ανδρέας Γιαννιώτης; born 18 December 1992) is a Greek professional footballer who plays as a goalkeeper for Turkish Süper Lig club Kasımpaşa.

== Club career ==
Gianniotis joined Olympiacos from Football League 2 side Ethnikos Gazoros on 22 June 2012 after impressive league performances in the 2011–12 Football League 2.

He joined Fostiras on loan in January 2014. He joined PAS Giannina on loan in August 2014. He joined Olympiacos in January 2015. He joined Panionios on loan for two years in summer 2015. His performances during the last two years, was his passport to be called by Skibbe for the crucial game against Bosnia which will held in Zenica on 9 June.

On summer 2017, the administration of Olympiacos wants to extend the current contract of talented goalkeeper, which expires in the summer of 2019. The 24-year-old player spent the last two seasons on loan to Panionios, with more than 35 performances for all competitions, while the Reds are planning to extend his current contract until the summer of 2021.

On 1 September 2017, after the acquisition of ex-international goalie Silvio Proto, Giannotis is not in the season plans of Albanian manager of the Reds, Besnik Hasi, and he solved his contract with the club, in order to find more playing time. On 4 September 2017, Atromitos officially announced the signing of goalkeeper Andreas Gianniotis, who was recently released from Olympiacos, until the end of 2018–19 season. On 4 November 2017, in a goalless home Super League draw game against rivals Panionios, Giannotis kept a 8 in a row clean sheets, entered as the new no.7 at the Top 10 of all time performances for the Greek championship.

On 29 May 2018, Gianniotis returned to Olympiacos on a trade deal with Atromitos. Olympiacos will activate the return clause in Gianniotis’ current contract with Atromitos and instead of paying them €300,000 for the player, Olympiacos will give Spyros Risvanis on a free transfer in exchange for the goalkeeper. On 9 August 2018, he made his international debut in a 4–0 home win UEFA Europa League Third qualifying round, 1st leg game against FC Luzern.

On 5 June 2019, Gianniotis signed a three-year contract with champions Maccabi Tel Aviv which included an option to extend his stay by a further year for an estimated €500,000 fee per year. He started as the undisputed first goalie of the club, gaining his first title as a starter in a 1–0 2019 Israel Super Cup game against Bnei Yehuda Tel Aviv, but on 18 August 2019 he suffered a ruptured sideband in the ankle in the semifinal Toto Cup Al game against Hapoel Ironi Kiryat Shmona.

On 6 August 2020, Gianniotis returned to Atromitos on a season-long loan from Maccabi Tel Aviv. In the 2020/21 season, Gianniotis made 18 league appearances and kept 6 clean sheets.

On 30 June 2021, Gianniotis returned to Maccabi Tel Aviv after his one-season loan with Atromitos had come to an end.

== International career ==
On 16 March 2018, he was called in the Greece national team from Michael Skibbe for the friendly matches against Switzerland on 23 March 2018 and Egypt on 27 March 2018. On 27 March 2018, he made his debut in the Greece national team against Egypt as a starter.

== Career statistics ==
As of match played 12 May 2026

Appearances and goals by club, season and competition
Club	Season	League			National cup (Note: Includes Greek Football Cup, Israel State Cup, Turkish Cup)		League cup (Note: Includes Toto Cup)		Europe		Other		Total	
Club	Season	Division	Apps	Goals	Apps	Goals	Apps	Goals	Apps	Goals	Apps	Goals	Apps	Goals
Ethnikos Gazoros	2011–12	Football League	18	0	0	0	—		—		—		18	0
Fostiras (loan)	2013–14	Football League	14	0	0	0	—		—		—		14	0
PAS Giannina (loan)	2014–15	Super League Greece	0	0	1	0	—		—		—		1	0
Panionios (loan)	2015–16	Super League Greece	3	0	2	0	—		—		—		5	0
Panionios (loan)	2016–17	Super League Greece	33	0	1	0	—		—		—		34	0
Panionios (loan)	Total		36	0	3	0	—		—		—		39	0
Atromitos	2017–18	Super League Greece	26	0	0	0	—		—		—		26	0
Olympiacos	2018–19	Super League Greece	7	0	1	0	—		5 (Note: Appearances in UEFA Europa League)	0	—		13	0
Maccabi Tel Aviv	2019–20	Israeli Premier League	3	0	1	0	1	0	4 (Note: Two appearances in UEFA Champions League, two appearances in UEFA Europa League)	0	1 (Note: Appearance in Israel Super Cup)	0	8	0
Maccabi Tel Aviv	2021–22	Israeli Premier League	0	0	0	0	1	0	0	0	0	0	1	0
Maccabi Tel Aviv	Total		3	0	1	0	2	0	4	0	1	0	9	0
Atromitos (loan)	2020–21	Super League Greece	18	0	0	0	—		—		—		18	0
Atromitos	2021–22	Super League Greece	21	0	1	0	—		—		—		22	0
Atromitos	2022–23	Super League Greece	31	0	3	0	—		—		—		34	0
Atromitos	Total		70	0	4	0	—		—		—		74	0
Kasımpaşa	2023–24	Süper Lig	31	0	0	0	—		—		—		31	0
Kasımpaşa	2024–25	Süper Lig	33	0	0	0	—		—		—		33	0
Kasımpaşa	2025–26	Süper Lig	33	1	0	0	—		—		—		33	1
Kasımpaşa	Total		97	1	0	0	—		—		—		97	1
Career total			271	1	10	0	2	0	9	0	1	0	293	1

== Honours ==
=== Club ===
Olympiacos

- Super League Greece: 2012–13, 2014–15
- Greek Cup: 2014–15

Maccabi Tel-Aviv

- Israeli Premier League: 2019–20
- Israel Super Cup: 2019

=== Individual ===
- Gamma Ethniki Young Player of the Season: 2011–12
- Gamma Ethniki Goalkeeper of the Season: 2011–12
- Super League Greece Goalkeeper of the Season: 2016–17, 2017–18
- Super League Greece Team of the Season: 2016–17, 2017–18
- Atromitos Player of the Season: 2022–23
