= Filippos Skopelitis =

Greek footballer

Personal information
- Date of birth: 26 August 1994 (age 32)
- Place of birth: Greece
- Height: 1.74 m (5 ft 9 in)
- Position: Attacking midfielder

Team information
- Current team: Olympiacos Volos

Youth career
- Olympiacos Volos

Senior career*
Years	Team	Apps	(Gls)
2014–2016	Olympiacos Volos	21	(2)
2016	Niki Volos		
2016–2017	Karaiskakis		
2017	Niki Volos		
2017–2018	Filippos Alexandria		
2018	Almyros		
2018–2025	Olympiacos Volos	61	(3)
2025–2026	Sarakinos		
2026–	Olympiacos Volos		
- * Club domestic league appearances and goals as of 10 April 2022

Filippos Skopelitis (Greek: Φίλιππος Σκοπελίτης; born 26 August 1994) is a Greek professional footballer who plays as an attacking midfielder for Olympiacos Volos.
