= Vangelis Gotovos =

Greek footballer

Personal information
- Full name: Evangelos Gotovos
- Date of birth: 13 August 1986 (age 40)
- Place of birth: Thessaloniki, Greece
- Height: 1.87 m (6 ft 1 1/2 in)
- Position: Defender

Team information
- Current team: Panionios

Youth career
- –2008: Nestos

Senior career*
Years	Team	Apps	(Gls)
2008–2010	Odysseas Anagennisis	0	(0)
2010–2011	Olympiacos Volos	3	(0)
2011–2012	Niki Volos	0	(0)
2012	Iraklis Psachna	13	(0)
2012–2013	Olympiacos Volos	15	(1)
2013–2014	Niki Volos	28	(2)
2014–2015	Chania	19	(2)
2015–2016	Apollon Smyrnis	13	(0)
2016–2017	Agrotikos Asteras	25	(2)
2017–2018	Doxa Drama	29	(3)
2018–2019	Trikala	25	(1)
2019–2020	Egaleo	19	(0)
2020–2022	A.E. Kifisia	31	(1)
2022–	Panionios	0	(0)
- * Club domestic league appearances and goals as of 1 May 2022

Vangelis Gotovos (Greek: Βαγγέλης Γκότοβος; born 13 August 1986) is a Greek professional footballer who plays as a defender for Gamma Ethniki club Panionios.

== Club statistics ==
As of 25 June 2019

Club	Season	League			Cup		Other		Total	
Club	Season	Division	Apps	Goals	Apps	Goals	Apps	Goals	Apps	Goals
Olympiacos Volos	2010–11	Super League Greece	3	0	0	0	—		3	0
Iraklis Psachna	2011–12	Football League	13	0	0	0	—		13	0
Olympiacos Volos	2012–13	Football League	15	0	5	1	—		20	1
Niki Volos	2013–14	Football League	28	2	3	0	—		31	2
Chania	2014–15	Football League	19	2	9	1	—		28	3
Apollon Smyrnis	2015–16	Football League	13	0	2	0	—		15	0
Agrotikos Asteras	2016–17	Football League	25	2	1	0	—		26	2
Kallithea	2017–18	Football League	29	3	0	0	—		29	3
Trikala	2018–19	Football League	25	1	3	0	—		28	1
Career total			170	10	23	2	0	0	193	12
