= Emrah Cebeci =

Turkish footballer

Personal information
- Date of birth: 14 April 1989 (age 37)
- Place of birth: Stolberg, Rhineland, West Germany
- Height: 1.86 m (6 ft 1 in)
- Position: Midfielder

Senior career*
Years	Team	Apps	(Gls)
2008–2009	SV Breinig	6	(1)
2009–2011	Patro Eiseden	13	(2)
2011–2012	Excelsior Veldwezelt	8	(1)
2012–2013	Denizlispor	16	(4)
2013–2014	SV Breinig	12	(5)
2014–2015	Fostiras	9	(1)
2016	Borussia Freialdenhoven]	2	(0)
2017–2019	SV 1914 Eilendorf		
- * Club domestic league appearances and goals

Emrah Cebeci (born 14 April 1989) is a Turkish former professional footballer who played as a midfielder.
