= Cristian Chávez (footballer, born 1987) =

Argentine footballer (born 1987)

Personal information
- Full name: Cristian Gabriel Chávez
- Date of birth: June 4, 1987 (age 39)
- Place of birth: Lomas de Zamora, Argentina
- Height: 1.71 m (5 ft 7 in)
- Positions: Left winger; forward

Team information
- Current team: Boca Unidos

Youth career
- San Lorenzo

Senior career*
Years	Team	Apps	(Gls)
2008–2011	San Lorenzo	24	(2)
2009–2010	→ Godoy Cruz (loan)	23	(3)
2010–2011	→ Atlético Tucumán (loan)	25	(12)
2011–2013	Napoli	2	(0)
2012	→ San Lorenzo (loan)	11	(1)
2012–2013	→ Almirante Brown (loan)	30	(12)
2013–2016	PAS Giannina	58	(13)
2016–2017	Brown de Adrogué	50	(21)
2017	Guaraní	9	(3)
2018–2019	Aldosivi	32	(13)
2019–2022	Independiente	7	(0)
2020	→ Central Córdoba (loan)	3	(0)
2020–2021	→ Defensor Sporting (loan)	12	(1)
2021–2022	→ Almirante Brown (loan)	30	(8)
2022	→ Godoy Cruz (loan)	3	(1)
2023	Cañuelas	8	(1)
2023	San Miguel	19	(6)
2025	Liniers	17	(4)
2025–2026	Midland	7	(1)
2026	Boca Unidos	1	(1)
- * Club domestic league appearances and goals as of 17:20, 30 March 2026 (UTC)

Cristian Gabriel Chávez (born 4 June 1987, in Lomas de Zamora) is an Argentine football winger or forward who plays for Boca Unidos.

== Career ==
=== From San Lorenzo to Napoli and the homecoming ===
Chávez made his league debut for San Lorenzo in a 1–0 win to Racing Club on March 7, 2008. In the 2008 Copa Libertadores he scored a goal in a 3–2 victory against Real Potosí, helping San Lorenzo's comeback in the game. He was subsequently loaned to Godoy Cruz and Atlético Tucumán.

On August 14, 2011, he signed for the Italian club Napoli for €1.5 million. On 10 February 2012 he went on loan to San Lorenzo.

=== PAS Giannina ===
In July 2013, he signed a three-year contract with PAS Giannina of the Super League Greece. He made his debut with the club on 18 August 2013 in a 3–3 draw against Asteras Tripolis scoring the first goal.

Despite rumours linking him with a move to PAOK after his contract with PAS Giannina was terminated in January 2016

Due to his great performances, he soon became very popular along with the strong club's fans, he returned to Argentina.

=== Back to South America ===
In February 2016, he signed a one-and-a-half-year contract with Argentinian club Club Atletico Brown playing in the Primera B Nacional.

On 1 July 2017, he signed a one-year contract with the Paraguayan football team Club Guaraní.

On 5 January 2018, he signed with Argentinian club Aldosivi playing in the Primera B Nacional.
