= Stelios Kritikos =

Greek footballer

Personal information
- Full name: Stylianos Kritikos
- Date of birth: January 10, 1986 (age 40)
- Place of birth: Athens, Greece
- Height: 1.82 m (6 ft 0 in)
- Position: Striker

Youth career
- Panathinaikos U20

Senior career*
Years	Team	Apps	(Gls)
2004–2006	Panathinaikos	1	(0)
2006–2007	→ Ethnikos Asteras (loan)	11	(2)
2007	→ Koropi (loan)	13	(2)
2007–2009	→ Ethnikos Piraeus (loan)	39	(6)
2009	→ Ionikos (loan)	13	(0)
2009–2011	Ilioupoli	66	(7)
2011–2012	Glyfada	0	(0)
2012	Kalamata	11	(3)
2012–2013	Vyzas Megara	12	(2)
2013–2014	AEL	22	(1)
2014	Iraklis Psachna	36	(12)
2014–2015	Chania	22	(5)
2015–2016	Apollon Smyrnis	12	(1)
2016–2017	Panegialios	29	(10)
2017–2018	Aittitos Spata	25	(11)
2018–2019	Kerkyra	7	(0)
2019–2020	Ionikos	23	(13)
2020–2022	A.E. Kifisia	12	(2)
2022	Proodeftiki	0	(0)
2022–2023	Panelefsiniakos		
2023	Fostiras		
2023–2024	Aris Petroupolis		
2024–2025	Acharnaikos		
- * Club domestic league appearances and goals as of 10:00, 12 October 2024 (UTC)

Stelios Kritikos (Greek: Στέλιος Κρητικός; born 10 January 1986) is a Greek professional footballer who plays as a centre forward.
