= Konstantinos Pangalos =

Greek footballer

Personal information
- Full name: Konstantinos Pangalos
- Date of birth: 3 July 1985 (age 41)
- Place of birth: Chania, Greece
- Height: 1.80 m (5 ft 11 in)
- Position: Forward

Youth career
- –2005: Ionia Chanion

Senior career*
| Years | Team | Apps | (Gls) |
| 2005 | Ionia Chanion | 3 | (0) |
| 2006–2010 | Platanias | 30 | (14) |
| 2010 | Panthrakikos | 9 | (0) |
| 2011 | Panachaiki | 4 | (0) |
| 2011 | Iraklis Psachna | 5 | (0) |
| 2012 | Platanias | 24 | (1) |
| 2012–2015 | AO Chania | 73 | (20) |
| 2015–2016 | Platanias | 6 | (0) |
| 2016–2017 | AEZ Zakakiou | 15 | (8) |
| 2017 | OFI | 14 | (3) |
| 2017–2018 | Aris Limassol | 19 | (1) |
| 2018–2019 | Paleochora | | |
| 2019 | AEEK SYNKA | | |
- * Club domestic league appearances and goals as of 22:02, 24 February (UTC)

Konstantinos Pangalos (Greek: Κωνσταντίνος Πάγκαλος; born 3 July 1985) is a Greek footballer who plays as a forward.

== Career ==
On 28 July 2019, AEEK SYNKA announced the signing of Pangalos. However, the club confirmed on 23 October 2019, that Pangalos had left the club again by mutual agreement due to professional reasons.
