= Themistoklis Tzimopoulos =

Greek-born New Zealand footballer

Personal information
- Date of birth: 20 November 1985 (age 40)
- Place of birth: Kozani, Greece
- Height: 1.88 m (6 ft 2 in)
- Position: Centre-back

Team information
- Current team: PAS Giannina (technical director)

Senior career*
| Years | Team | Apps | (Gls) |
| 2003–2006 | Akratitos | 43 | (0) |
| 2006–2009 | Veria | 32 | (1) |
| 2008 | → Kerkyra (loan) | 20 | (1) |
| 2009–2010 | Ethnikos Asteras | 29 | (4) |
| 2010–2019 | PAS Giannina | 222 | (16) |
| 2019–2021 | Korona Kielce | 30 | (2) |
| 2019 | Korona Kielce II | 2 | (0) |
| 2021–2023 | Levadiakos | 59 | (5) |
| 2023–2024 | Kozani | 8 | (0) |

International career
| 2005 | Greece U21 | 1 | (0) |
| 2015–2017 | New Zealand | 14 | (1) |

Managerial career
- 2025–: PAS Giannina (technical director)
- * Club domestic league appearances and goals as of 18 November 2024

Themistoklis Tzimopoulos (Greek: Θεμιστοκλής Τζημόπουλος; born 20 November 1985) is a former professional footballer who played as a centre-back. Born in Greece, he represented New Zealand at international level.

== Club career ==
Born in Kozani, Greece, Tzimopoulos began his professional career with Akratitos in December 2003, having previously signed as a trainee. He played for Akratitos in the Super League Greece, before joining Veria, as well as a brief loan spell at Kerkyra in 2008. He joined second division side Ethnikos Asteras for the 2009–10 season.

In September 2010, Tzimopoulos signed a two-year contract with PAS Giannina.

On 6 April 2017, Tzimopoulos had a surgery on the knee to restore meniscal tear suffered, and will naturally lose the remainder of the current season. On 2 May 2018 he extended his contract until the summer of 2020.

On 21 June 2019, Tzimopoulos was released from PAS Giannina.

Three days later, he signed a two-year contract with Korona Kielce on a free transfer.

== International career ==
Tzimopoulos was called into the All Whites squad for a 31 March 2015 friendly in Seoul against South Korea by coach Anthony Hudson. Tzimopoulos is eligible for the All Whites through his mother's birthplace. "Every professional player dreams to play international football so it's an honour for me to play for the All Whites. It will be a great challenge for me to play at a higher level and to meet the requirements of the team.", he said.

On 28 May 2016, with an early goal from Tzimopoulos, the All Whites got off to a winning start at the OFC Nations Cup after a hard-fought and physical 3–1 victory over Fiji. Tzimopoulos' exceptional season year with PAS Giannina was his passport to be called up by Hudson to the final 23-man squad for the 2017 Confederations Cup.

=== International goals ===
Scores and results list New Zealand's goal tally first.

| Goal | Date | Venue | Opponent | Score | Result | Competition |
|---|---|---|---|---|---|---|
| 1. | 28 May 2016 | Sir John Guise Stadium, Port Moresby, Papua New Guinea | Fiji | 1–0 | 3–1 | 2016 OFC Nations Cup |

== Post-retirement ==
Tzimopoulos was appointed as technical director of PAS Giannina in October 2025.

== Honours ==
Akratitos

- Beta Ethniki runner-up: 2004–05

Levadiakos

- Super League 2: 2021–22

New Zealand

- OFC Nations Cup: 2016
