= Ritchie Kitoko =

Belgian footballer

Personal information
- Full name: Ritchie Kitoko
- Date of birth: 11 June 1988 (age 38)
- Place of birth: Kinshasa, Zaire
- Height: 1.79 m (5 ft 10 in)
- Position: Defensive midfielder

Team information
- Current team: Olympiacos Volos
- Number: 71

Youth career
- 2004–2006: Standard Liège

Senior career*
Years	Team	Apps	(Gls)
2006–2008	Albacete B		
2008–2009	Albacete	34	(2)
2009–2016	Udinese	0	(0)
2010–2011	→ Granada (loan)	17	(0)
2011–2012	→ Tenerife (loan)	39	(2)
2012–2013	→ Girona (loan)	7	(0)
2013–2014	→ Jaén (loan)	34	(0)
2014–2016	→ Asteras Tripolis (loan)	9	(0)
2016–2018	UCAM Murcia	55	(0)
2018–2020	Racing Santander	33	(1)
2020–2021	Apollon Smyrnis	9	(0)
2021–	Olympiacos Volos	0	(0)

International career
2005–2006	Belgium U18	12	(0)
2007	Belgium U19	2	(0)
2009	Belgium U20	1	(0)
2009	Belgium U21	5	(1)
- * Club domestic league appearances and goals as of 19 May 2021

Ritchie Kitoko (born 11 June 1988) is a Belgian professional footballer who plays as a defensive midfielder for Greek Super League 2 club Olympiacos Volos.

== Club career ==
Born in Kinshasa, Zaire (now the Democratic Republic of the Congo), Kitoko moved to Belgium in his teens, entering Standard Liège's youth system in 2004. Two years later he signed his first professional contract, with Albacete Balompié in Spain, spending almost two full seasons with the B-team in the fourth division.

On 20 August 2009, Kitoko joined Udinese Calcio in Serie A. However, on 2 January of the following year, he returned to Spain and signed for Granada CF on loan until the end of the campaign in the third level, as the Andalusians had recently signed a partnership agreement with the Italians; he contributed with 13 games (12 starts) as his team returned to the second tier after an absence of more than 20 years.

On 31 January 2011, deemed surplus to requirements at Granada, Kitoko moved to another club in the same country and division, CD Tenerife, still owned by Udinese. He appeared regularly as a starter during his short spell, but the Canary Islands side eventually suffered relegation, a second consecutive.

An unassuming two-year spell in the Super League Greece with Asteras Tripolis notwithstanding, Kitoko continued competing in Spain's level two in the following years.

== International career ==
After choosing to play for Belgium internationally, Kitoko represented the nation in various youth levels. In May 2009 he earned his first call-up to the senior team, for the Kirin Cup, but did not appear in the tournament.
