= Georgios Dasios =

Greek footballer

Personal information
- Full name: Georgios Dasios
- Date of birth: 12 May 1983 (age 43)
- Place of birth: Ioannina, Greece
- Height: 1.74 m (5 ft 9 in)
- Position: Right-back

Youth career
- 1998–2001: PAS Giannina

Senior career*
Years	Team	Apps	(Gls)
2001–2015	PAS Giannina	299	(11)
2015–2016	Olympiacos Volos	9	(0)
2016	Lamia	12	(0)
2016–2018	Apollon Smyrnis	35	(1)
2018–2019	Panachaiki	33	(0)

Managerial career
- 2019–2020: PAS Giannina (director of football)
- 2024–2025: PAS Giannina (team manager)
- 2026–: PAS Giannina (team manager)
- * Club domestic league appearances and goals as of 25 June 2019

Georgios Dasios (Greek: Γεώργιος Ντάσιος; born 12 May 1983) is a Greek former professional footballer who played as a right-back.

== Career ==
Born in Ioannina, Dasios has spent his entire career playing for local side PAS Giannina and was elected team captain. By the end of the 2014/15 season, he completed 299 appearances with PAS. Throughout his career, Dasios scored 11 goals. His contract expired on 30 June 2015 as it wasn't renewed.

On 6 August 2015 Dasios signed a contract with Olympiacos Volos. He played nine times in the league and made one appearance in the cup.

On 29 January 2016 he signed a contract with Lamia.

On 29 June 2016 he signed a contract with Apollon Smyrnis. On 2 January 2018 he was released from Apollon Smyrnis. Three days later he joined Panachaiki on a one-and-a-half-year contract.

== Post-retirement ==
After he retired from playing, Dasios returned to PAS Giannina as Director of Football.
