= Mathieu Gomes =

French footballer (born 1985)

Personal information
- Full name: Mathieu Gomes Garcez
- Date of birth: 6 March 1985 (age 41)
- Place of birth: Bayonne, France
- Height: 1.79 m (5 ft 10 in)
- Positions: Forward; right back

Youth career
- Real Sociedad

Senior career*
Years	Team	Apps	(Gls)
2005–2006	Real Sociedad B	25	(4)
2006–2008	UD Salamanca	19	(2)
2008	Real Unión	26	(2)
2008–2009	Pomigliano	?	(?)
2009–2011	Juve Stabia	?	(?)
2011	→ Sanremese (loan)	?	(?)
2011–2012	Aprillia	36	(3)
2012–2013	Fokikos	34	(4)
2013–2018	Kerkyra	128	(13)
- * Club domestic league appearances and goals

Mathieu Gomes Garcez (born 6 March 1985 in Bayonne) is a French footballer.

Gomes started his career as a forward but is now a right back. He played in Spain and Italy before moving to Greece in 2012.
