= Fonsi (footballer) =

Spanish footballer (born 1986)

Personal information
- Full name: David López Nadales
- Date of birth: 22 January 1986 (age 40)
- Place of birth: Zaragoza, Spain
- Height: 1.78 m (5 ft 10 in)
- Position: Defender

Team information
- Current team: Calamocha

Youth career
- Zaragoza

Senior career*
Years	Team	Apps	(Gls)
2004–2005	Zaragoza B	4	(0)
2005–2006	Universidad Zaragoza	31	(2)
2006–2007	Teruel		
2007–2008	Cuarte	35	(2)
2008–2009	Santa Eulàlia	20	(0)
2009–2010	La Muela	33	(4)
2010–2012	Andorra	61	(14)
2012–2013	Teruel	37	(3)
2013–2014	Săgeata Năvodari	20	(0)
2014–2017	PAS Giannina	80	(1)
2018–2019	Apollon Smyrnis	31	(1)
2019–2020	Ejea	23	(1)
2020–2021	Sariñena	32	(3)
2021–2022	Cariñena	31	(4)
2022–2025	Calamocha	87	(29)
2025–	Cariñena	2	(0)
- * Club domestic league appearances and goals as of 14 September 2025

David López Nadales (born 22 January 1986), known as Fonsi, is a Spanish professional footballer who plays as a defender for Tercera Federación club Cariñena.

== Honours ==
- Top Assist Super League Greece: Runner-up 2017–18 (8 Assists)
