= Stamatis Sapalidis =

Greek footballer

Personal information
- Full name: Stamatios Sapalidis
- Date of birth: 5 July 1990 (age 36)
- Place of birth: Athens, Greece
- Height: 1.80 m (5 ft 11 in)
- Position: Forward

Team information
- Current team: APSE Amfiali
- Number: 9

Senior career*
Years	Team	Apps	(Gls)
2008–2009	Peramaikos		
2009–2010	Ethnikos Piraeus	3	(0)
2010	→ Niki Volos (loan)	18	(2)
2010–2011	Agia Paraskevi	13	(4)
2011	Rouf	9	(0)
2011–2012	Charavgiakos	24	(16)
2012–2014	Alimos	45	(38)
2014–2016	PAS Giannina	20	(0)
2016	Kissamikos	13	(2)
2016–2017	Ionikos		
2017	Egaleo	0	(0)
2018–2019	AE Moschato	38	(58)
2019–2020	Karava	17	(16)
2020	Olympiacos Agiou Stefanou	9	(12)
2021	Proodeftiki	7	(7)
2021–2022	Ellas Pontion	29	(39)
2022–2024	Asteras Kaisarianis	68	(75)
2024–	APSE Amfiali	55	(57)
- * Club domestic league appearances and goals as of April

Stamatis Sapalidis (Greek: Σταμάτης Σαπαλίδης; born 5 July 1990) is a Greek professional footballer who plays as a forward.

He is considered by many as one of the most prolific scorers in Greece, especially in the Athens & Piraeus Amateurs Leagues, with other 200 goals in his career.

== Career ==
Born in Athens, Sapalidis began playing football with Peramaikos. At 16 January 2016, Sapalidis was released by PAS Giannina. He agreed to continue his career in Kissamikos.
