= Perivolia Municipal Stadium =

Multi-purpose stadium in Mournies, Crete, Greece

- Δημοτικό Στάδιο Περιβολίων
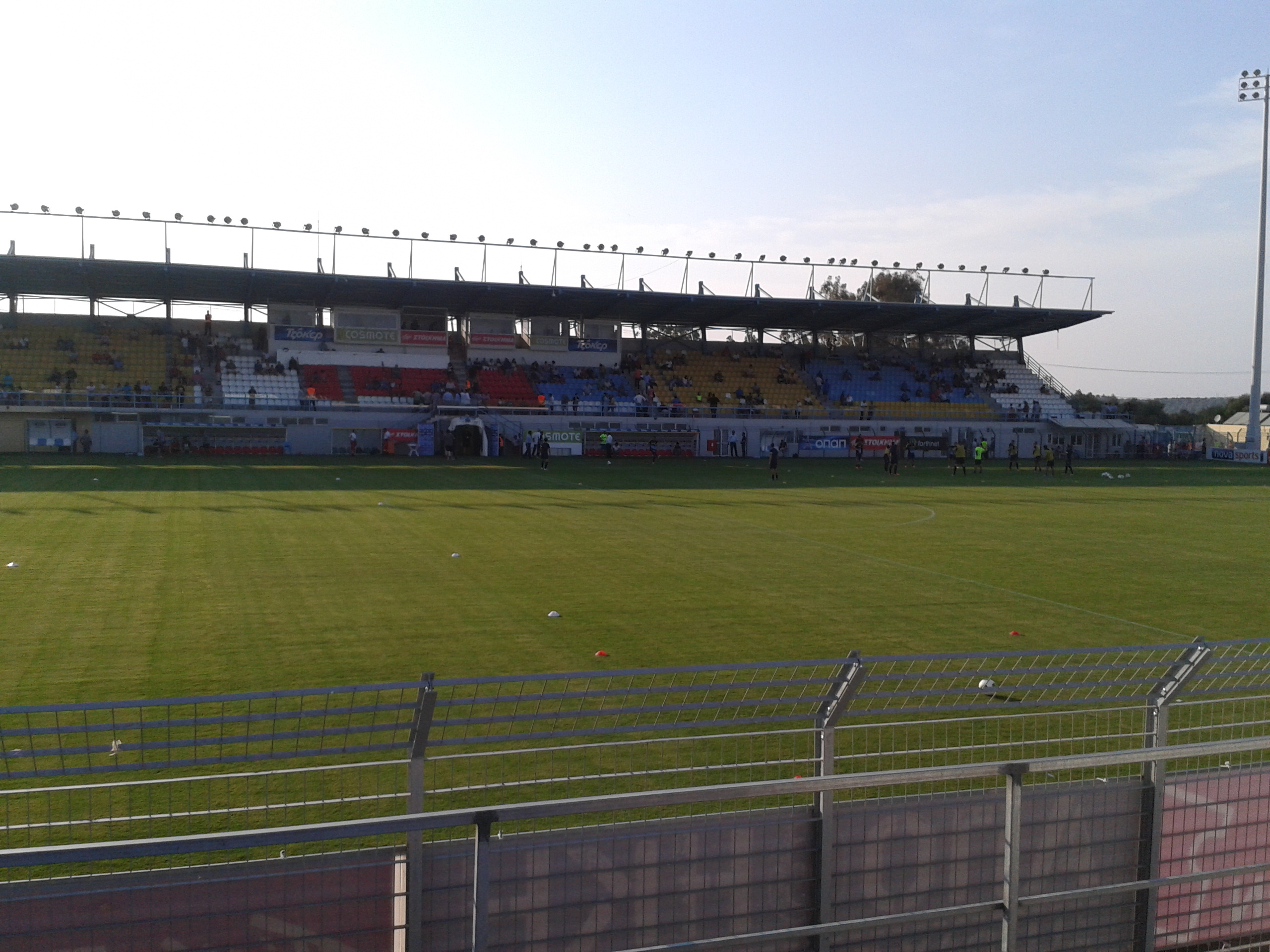
- Interactive map of Perivolia Municipal Stadium
- Full name: Perivolia Municipal Stadium
- Location: Chania, Crete, Greece
- Coordinates: 35°29′14.10″N 24°00′02.00″E
- Owner: Municipality Of Chania
- Operator: Municipal Authority Of Chania
- Capacity: 4,527
- Surface: Grass
- Scoreboard: Yes
- Record attendance: 4,041 (16 September 2012)
- Field size: 105 x 68 m

Construction
- Built: 1959
- Cost: 600,000 € (2012 Renovation)

Tenant
- Chania FC

Perivolia Municipal Stadium (Greek: Δημοτικό Στάδιο Περιβολιών) is a multi-purpose stadium in Mournies, Chania, Greece.

From the 2012-2013 season, Platanias FC were based at Perivolia Municipal Stadium, which led to extensive upgrading and modernization work at all levels during the summer of 2012, to meet in full all obligations set by the organizing principle of the Greek Super League.

Since then, the Municipal stadium has "transformed" into a modern football stadium, with two tiers (one of them covered), journalists bays, brand-new change rooms for athletes and referees (female assistants have separate changing rooms), clinic, gym, comfortable offices for observers, room for press conferences, and other facilities.

Platanias FC spent 6 years in the top tier Greek Super League from 2012-2013 until their relegation after 2017-2018.

From the 2017-2018 season, Chania FC are also based at Perivolia Municipal Stadium following the merger of AO Chania and PGS Kissamikos.

Platanias FC returned to playing at the smaller Maleme stadium in 2023, making Chania FC the main team at Perivolia stadium.
