= Kerkyra Stadium =

Multi-purpose stadium in Kerkyra, Greece

Kerkyra stadium
- Interactive map of Kerkyra stadium
- Full name: Municipal Stadium of Kerkyra
- Location: Corfu, Greece
- Coordinates: 39°36′40.91″N 19°54′57.01″E
- Operator: A.O. Kerkyra
- Capacity: 3,000
- Surface: Grass
- Scoreboard: Νο
- Field size: 105 x 68 m

Construction
- Built: 1961

Tenants
- A.O. Kerkyra (1968–2013); PAE Kerkyra (2013–2021); A.O. Kerkyra (2021–present)

Kerkyra Stadium (Greek: Δημοτικό Στάδιο Κέρκυρας) is a multi-purpose stadium in Kerkyra, Greece. It is currently used mostly for football matches and is the home stadium of A.O. Kerkyra. The stadium holds 3,000 people and was built in 1961.

== History ==
The stadium is part of Corfu's National Athletic Center (EAC). It has two stands, one large west and one smaller east, built in 1973. Chrysopatas was first placed in 1983. In 2003, headlamps were installed, while in 2005, all platforms were covered with plastic seats. The construction of the shelter over the big stand was made in 2007. In 2010, a 200-seat slot was delivered as a temporary solution, but it is basically not used (no tickets are issued for it). The capacity of the new petal is projected to be 1,230 seats when completed.
