= Evripidis Giakos =

Greek footballer

Personal information
- Date of birth: 9 April 1991 (age 35)
- Place of birth: Ioannina, Greece
- Height: 1.92 m (6 ft 3 1/2 in)
- Position: Attacking midfielder

Team information
- Current team: PAS Giannina

Youth career
- 2002–2008: PAS Giannina

Senior career*
Years	Team	Apps	(Gls)
2008–2019	PAS Giannina	195	(15)
2010–2012	→ Doxa Kranoula (loan)	40	(8)
2019	AEL	0	(0)
2020–2021	Chania	11	(3)
2021	Apollon Larissa	21	(2)
2021–2022	AEL	22	(2)
2022–2023	Anagennisi Karditsa	26	(1)
2023–2024	Achyronas-Onisilos	15	(2)
2024	Kozani	14	(2)
2024–2026	Hellas Syros	48	(16)
2026	Mykonos		
2026	Panegialios		
2026–	PAS Giannina		
- * Club domestic league appearances and goals as of 21 December 2025

Evripidis Giakos (Greek: Ευριπίδης Γιάκος; born 9 April 1991) is a Greek professional footballer who plays as an attacking midfielder for Gamma Ethniki club PAS Giannina.

== Career ==
Born in Ioannina, Giakos began playing football with PAS Giannina. On 4 January 2009, he made his professional debut for PAS Giannina in a match against Agrotikos Asteras.
