= Noé Acosta =

Spanish footballer

Personal information
- Full name: Noé Acosta Rivera
- Date of birth: 10 December 1983 (age 42)
- Place of birth: Guadalajara, Spain
- Height: 1.77 m (5 ft 9 1/2 in)
- Position: Midfielder

Youth career
- 1999–2002: Real Madrid

Senior career*
Years	Team	Apps	(Gls)
2002–2003	Moscardó	20	(11)
2003–2004	Atlético Madrid C	37	(7)
2004–2005	Murcia B	32	(5)
2005–2006	Alcalá	26	(1)
2006–2007	Almería B	35	(7)
2007–2009	Motril	55	(10)
2010	Universitatea Cluj	24	(2)
2011	Olympiakos Volos	16	(0)
2011–2012	Aris	19	(3)
2012–2013	Levadiakos	23	(0)
2013	Olympiacos Volos	9	(2)
2014–2017	PAS Giannina	96	(9)
2017–2018	Lamia	26	(1)
2018–2019	AEL	13	(0)
2019–2020	Jamshedpur	15	(3)
2020–2021	Atlético Pinto	5	(0)
2021–2022	SS Reyes B		
2022–2025	Coslada		
- * Club domestic league appearances and goals

Noé Acosta Rivera (born 10 December 1983) is a Spanish former professional footballer who played as a left midfielder.

Safe for one year in Romania with Universitatea Cluj and another in India with Jamshedpur, he spent his entire professional career in Greece, mainly with PAS Giannina.

== Club career ==
=== Spain ===
Acosta was born in Guadalajara, Castile-La Mancha. In his country, the Real Madrid youth graduate played exclusively in the lower leagues.

Acosta started in 2002 with CD Colonia Moscardó, going on to represent Atlético Madrid C, Real Murcia Imperial, RSD Alcalá – his only Segunda División B experience, suffering team relegation at the end of the 2005–06 season – UD Almería B and Motril CF.

=== Romania ===
Acosta moved abroad in January 2010, signing with FC Universitatea Cluj from Romania. He helped them promote to Liga I, contributing 14 games and two goals to the feat.

In his second year, Acosta appeared in ten matches as his team finished in eighth position, two points ahead of neighbouring CFR Cluj. This marked his first top-flight experience, at the age of 26.

=== Greece ===
Again in the January transfer window, free agent Acosta moved to Greece in 2011, starting with Olympiacos Volos. He still competed in the 2011–12 UEFA Europa League with the side, scoring in a 3–0 away win against FC Differdange 03 in the third qualifying round, but moved in September to fellow Super League club Aris Thessaloniki FC.

Acosta competed in both major levels in the following years, representing Levadiakos, Olympiacos Volos and PAS Giannina. On 25 August 2015 he renewed his contract with the latter until 2017, for an undisclosed fee.

On 21 June 2017, the 33-year-old Acosta moved to newly promoted PAS Lamia 1964. For the following campaign, he joined AEL also in the top tier on a one-year deal.

=== India ===
On 4 June 2019, Acosta signed a one-year contract with Indian Super League club Jamshedpur FC.
