= Anastasios Kritikos (footballer, born 1995) =

Greek footballer

Tasos Kritikos
Personal information
- Full name: Anastasios Kritikos
- Date of birth: 25 January 1995 (age 31)
- Place of birth: Larissa, Greece
- Height: 1.80 m (5 ft 11 in)
- Position: Left winger

Team information
- Current team: Trikala

Youth career
- 2010–2013: AEL

Senior career*
Years	Team	Apps	(Gls)
2013	AEL	11	(0)
2013–2015	PAS Giannina	17	(1)
2015–2018	AEL	12	(1)
2017	→ Anagennisi Karditsa (loan)	15	(2)
2018	→ Panserraikos (loan)	19	(0)
2018–2020	Doxa Drama	40	(14)
2020–2021	Volos	10	(1)
2021–2022	Xanthi	18	(2)
2022–2023	Apollon Smyrnis	7	(0)
2023–2024	Niki Volos	43	(8)
2024–2025	AEL	16	(2)
2025–2026	Panionios	17	(2)
2026–	Trikala		

International career
2013–2014	Greece U19	10	(3)
- * Club domestic league appearances and goals as of 20 April 2026

Anastasios 'Tasos' Kritikos (Greek: Αναστάσιος 'Τάσος' Κρητικός; born 25 January 1995) is a Greek professional footballer who plays as a forward for Gamma Ethniki club Trikala.

== Career ==
On 7 July 2020, Kritikos signed a two-year contract with Super League side Volos on a free transfer.

== Career statistics ==
=== Club ===
As of 24 August 2024

Club	Season	League			Cup		Continental		Other		Total	
Club	Season	Division	Apps	Goals	Apps	Goals	Apps	Goals	Apps	Goals	Apps	Goals
AEL	2012–13	Super League Greece 2	11	0	0	0	—		—		11	0
PAS Giannina	2013–14	Super League Greece	14	1	1	0	—		—		15	1
PAS Giannina	2014–15	Super League Greece	3	0	4	1	—		—		7	1
PAS Giannina	Total		17	1	5	1	—		—		22	2
AEL	2015–16	Super League Greece 2	5	0	3	1	—		—		8	1
AEL	2016–17	Super League Greece 2	0	0	0	0	—		—		0	0
AEL	2017–18	Super League Greece	1	0	3	0	—		—		4	0
AEL	Total		6	0	6	1	—		—		12	1
Anagennisi Karditsa (loan)	2016–17	Football League (Greece)	15	2	0	0	—		—		15	2
Panserraikos (loan)	2017–18	Football League (Greece)	19	0	0	0	—		—		19	0
Doxa Drama	2018–19	Football League (Greece)	21	9	1	0	—		—		22	9
Doxa Drama	2019–20	Football League (Greece)	19	5	1	0	—		—		20	5
Doxa Drama	Total		40	14	2	0	—		—		42	14
Volos	2020–21	Super League Greece	10	1	2	0	—		—		12	1
Xanthi	2021–22	Super League Greece 2	18	2	1	0	—		—		19	2
Apollon Smyrnis	2022–23	Super League Greece 2	7	0	0	0	—		—		7	0
Niki Volos	2022–23	Super League Greece 2	15	2	0	0	—		—		15	2
Niki Volos	2023–24	Super League Greece 2	28	6	5	1	—		—		33	7
Niki Volos	Total		43	8	5	1	—		—		48	9
Career total			194	29	13	2	0	0	0	0	197	31
