= 2012–13 Panionios F.C. season =

Panionios
2012–2013 season
- Chairman: Vasilis Tsavalos
- Manager: Konstantinos Panagopoulos
- Stadium: Nea Smyrni Stadium, Athens
- Super League Greece: 8th
- Greek Football Cup: 3rd round
- Top goalscorer: League: Christos Aravidis (8); All: Christos Aravidis (8)
- Highest home attendance: 3,953 vs PAOK (4 November 2012)
- Lowest home attendance: 972 vs Levadiakos (26 January 2013)
- Average home league attendance: 2,083 (excluding Cup)
Home colours	Away colours

The 2012–13 season was Panionios' 122nd season in existence and its 52nd in the top tier of the modern Greek football league system. This season marked the managerial debut of Dimitrios Eleftheropoulos.

== Club information ==
=== Current squad ===
As of February 2013

N	Pos.	Nat.	Name	Age	EU	Since	App	Goals	Ends	Transfer fee	Notes
3	LB	(Albania)	Kouros	33	EU	2011	22	0			
5	CB	(Greece)	Avlonitis	36	EU	2011	26	0			
7	LW	(Greece)	Kolovos	33	EU	2010	24	3			
8	LB	(Georgia (country))	Tsamourlidis	34	EU	2013	1	0			
9	CF	(Greece)	Kampantais	44	EU	2012	22	4			
10	CM	(Greece)	Mendrinos	41	EU	2012	24	1			
11	CB	(Greece)	Kouloucheris	45	EU	2012	13	1			
13	RW	(Greece)	Aravidis	39	EU	2012	25	8			
15	DM	(Greece)	Giannoulis	36	EU	2012	4	0			
16	CB	(Greece)	Andralas	47	EU	2012	15	1			
17	CM	(Greece)	Bouzas	33	EU	2011	3	0			
18	LW	(Greece)	Smyrlis	33	EU	2011	2	0			
19	CM	(Greece)	Aslanidis	37	EU	2013	0	0			
20	RM	(Greece)	Fanouris	43	EU	2004	29	3			
21	DM	(Greece)	Rokas	42	EU	2011	19	1			
22	AM	(Greece)	Samaris	37	EU	2010	20	4			
23	LM	(Albania)	Dounis	34	EU	2011	23	5			
27	RM	(Saudi Arabia)	Amiris	35	EU	2009	17	0			
29	CB	(Greece)	Pantidos	35	EU	2013	9	0			
31	GK	(Greece)	Giannakopoulos	33	EU	2012	14	0			
32	CB	(Greece)	Lampropoulos	36	EU	2012	9	2			
33	CB	(Greece)	Toskas	35	EU	2013	12	0			
39	RW	(Nigeria)	Okoye	35	Non-EU	2011	18	0			
40	MF	(Greece)	Spanos	32	EU	2012	0	0			
44	LM	(Greece)	Kontochristos	35	EU	2009	7	0			
45	SS	(Greece)	Mpeglektsis	35	EU	2013	2	0			
50	CB	(Greece)	Zygogiannis	32	EU	2012	1	0			
88	GK	(Greece)	Anestis	35	EU	2011	0	0			
91	GK	(Greece)	Peristeridis	35	EU	2012	17	0			
92	CM	(Greece)	Ganotis	34	EU	2013	0	0			
94	CM	(Greece)	Panagiotoudis	31	EU	2013	11	0			
97	CB	(Greece)	Kartsambas	36	EU	2013	1	0			
98	GK	(Greece)	Kouroumbetsis	30	EU	2013	0	0			
99	LB	(Greece)	Kotsalas	31	EU	2013	0	0			

== Transfers ==
=== In ===
Period	Pos.	Name	From	Fee
Summer	DF	(Greece) Paraskevas Andralas	(Greece) PAS Giannina	Free
Summer	DF	(Greece) Panagiotis Spyropoulos	(Greece) Panionios U20	
Summer	DF	(Greece) Giorgos Zygogiannis	(Greece) Panionios U20	
Summer	DF	(Greece) Miltiadis Kalaitzidis	(Greece) Proodeftiki	Free
Summer	MF	(Greece) Angelos-Lambros Spanos	(Greece) Panionios U20	
Summer	MF	(Greece) Dionysis Giannoulis	(Sweden) IF Sylvia	Free
Summer	DF	(Greece) Vasilis Lambropoulos	(Greece) Ethnikos Asteras	Free
Summer	GK	(Greece) Kostas Peristeridis	(Netherlands) Almere City	Free
Summer	FW	(Greece) Christos Aravidis	(Greece) Doxa Drama	Free
Summer	FW	(Greece) Leonidas Kampantais	(Greece) OFI	Free
Summer	FW	(Greece) Stelios Koxarakis	(Greece) Ethnikos Asteras	Free
Summer	FW	(Greece) Dimitrios Diamantakos	(Greece) Olympiacos	Loan
Summer	GK	(Greece) Nikos Giannakopoulos	(Italy) Udinese	Loan
Summer	MF	(Greece) Angelos Pournos	(Greece) Vyzas	Free
Summer	MF	(Greece) Christos Kontochristos	(Greece) Niki Volos	Return From Loan
Summer	GK	(Greece) Giannis Anestis	(Greece) Proodeftiki	Return From Loan
Winter	MF	(Greece) Kostas Panagiotoudis	(Greece) PAOK	Loan
Winter	DF	(Greece) Dimitris Toskas	(Greece) Pierikos	Free
Winter	DF	(Greece) Christos Kartsambas	(Greece) Pierikos	Free
Winter	DF	(Greece) Dimitris Aslanidis	(Greece) Aris	Free
Winter	MF	(Greece) Konastantinos Ganotis	(Greece) PAS Giannina	Free
Winter	FW	(Greece) Panagiotis Kalogiannis	(Greece) Glyfada	Free
Winter	DF	(Greece) Pantelis Pozidis	(Greece) Aris	Free
Winter	DF	(Greece) Nikos Pantidos	(Greece) Aris	Free
Winter	DF	(Greece) Michalis Tsamourlidis	(Greece) AEK Athens	Loan

=== Out ===
Period	Pos.	Name	To	Fee
Summer	GK	(Austria) Jürgen Macho	-	-
Summer	FW	(Greece) Andreas Stamatis	(Greece) AEK Athens	Free
Summer	DF	(Haiti) Jean-Jacques Pierre	(France) Caen	Free
Summer	GK	(Greece) Chrisostomos Michailidis	-	-
Summer	FW	(Finland) Njazi Kuqi	(Greece) Atromitos	Free
Summer	DF	(Greece) Dimitris Siovas	(Greece) Olympiacos	€264.000
Summer	DF	(Greece) Dimitris Petkakis	(Cyprus) AEP Paphos	Free
Summer	MF	(Malta) André Schembri	(Cyprus) Omonia	Free
Summer	MF	(Greece) Dimitrios Anastasopoulos	(Greece) Kavala	Free
Summer	FW	(Democratic Republic of the Congo) Patrick Dimbala	(Greece) Panetolikos	Free
Summer	DF	(Greece) Kosmas Gezos	(Greece) Glyfada	Loan
Summer	FW	(Greece) Kostas Stavrothanasopoulos	(Greece) Thrasyvoulos	Loan
Summer	FW	(Azerbaijan) Araz Abdullayev	(England) Everton	End of loan
Summer	GK	(Hungary) Krisztián Pogacsics	(Romania) Bihor Oradea	End of loan
Summer	DF	(Portugal) Vitorino Antunes	(Italy) Roma	End of loan
Winter	MF	(Serbia) Dejan Milovanović	(France) Lens	End of Loan
Winter	GK	(Greece) Giannis Siderakis	(Greece) AEL Kalloni	Free
Winter	FW	(Greece) Dimitrios Diamantakos	(Greece) Olympiacos	End of Loan
Winter	MF	(Greece) Vasilios Rovas	(Greece) Apollon Smyrnis	Free
Winter	DF	(Nigeria) Suleiman Omo	-	-
Winter	DF	(Greece) Panagiotis Spyropoulos	(Greece) Panathinaikos	Free
Winter	FW	(Greece) Dimitris Drosos	(Greece) Kallithea	€35.200
Winter	MF	(Greece) Giorgos Vlachos	-	-
Winter	DF	(Greece) Miltiadis Kalaitzidis	(Greece) Proodeftiki	Free
Winter	FW	(Greece) Stelios Koxarakis	-	-
Winter	MF	(Greece) Aggelos Pournos	(Greece) Vyzas Megaron	Free
Winter	DF	(Greece) Konstantinos Samaropoulos	(Greece) Anagennisi Giannitsa	-
Winter	DF	(Greece) Pantelis Pozidis	(Greece) Vyzas Megaron	Loan
Winter	FW	(Greece) Panagiotis Kalogiannis	(Greece) Thrasyvoulos	Loan

== Matches ==
=== Pre-season Friendlies ===
22 July 2012 Tournament (3-5 Pigadia)	Panionios	2 - 0	Bylis Ballsh	(3-5 Pigadia)Naousa
	Aravidis 10'; Goundoulakis 55'

24 July 2012 Tournament (3-5 Pigadia)	Panionios	0 - 0	Argirokastro	(3-5 Pigadia)Naousa

25 July 2012 Tournament (3-5 Pigadia)	Panionios	3 - 0	Korinthos	(3-5 Pigadia)Naousa
	Aravidis 20'; Samaris 22'; Kouloucheris 78'

29 July 2012 Tournament (3-5 Pigadia)	PAS Giannina	2 - 0	Panionios	(3-5 Pigadia)Naousa
	Kouloucheris (o.g.); De Vincenti 36'

8 August 2012 friendly	Panionios	1 - 0	Platanias	Nea Smyrni
	Milovanović 85' (pen.)			Stadium: Nea Smyrni Stadium

12 August 2012 friendly	Panionios	1 - 2	Levadiakos	Nea Smyrni
	Aravidis 5'		Acosta 40'; Lisgaras 60'	Stadium: Nea Smyrni Stadium

18 August 2012 friendly	Parma	3 - 1	Panionios	Orzinuovi
	Pabón 8', 43'; Parolo 31'		Diamantakos 77'	Stadium: Stadio Comunale

=== Super League ===
27 August 2012 Round 1	Panionios	1 - 0	Aris	Nea Smyrni
20:30	Dounis (yellow card) 1'; Lambropoulos 14'; Kampantais (red card); Kouloucheris (yellow card) 86'; Lambropoulos (red card); Rovas (yellow card) 86'; Giannakopoulos (yellow card) 90+5'	Summary	Aslanidis (yellow card) 22'; Papasterianos (yellow card) 43'; Pantidos (yellow card) 64'; Tsoukanis (yellow card) 72'; Papazaharias (yellow card) 86'; Gianniotas (yellow card) 90+6'; Sokratis Dioudis (yellow card) 90+6'	Stadium: Nea Smyrni Stadium; Attendance: 2,091; Referee: Ilias Spathas

1 September 2012 Round 2	Veria	0 - 1	Panionios	Veria
17:15		summary	Mendrinos 50'	Stadium: Veria Stadium; Attendance: 471

17 September 2012 Round 3	Panionios	2 - 1	OFI	Nea Smyrni
20:30	Šišić 30' (o.g.); Vando 54' (o.g.)	summary	Kouloucheris 84' (o.g.)	Stadium: Nea Smyrni Stadium; Attendance: 2,054

22 September 2012 Round 4	Levadiakos	3 - 0	Panionios	Levadia
17:15	Vasileiou 3', 9'; Zisopoulos 18'	summary		Stadium: Levadia Municipal Stadium; Attendance: 990

29 September 2012 Round 5	Panionios	1 - 0	AEK Athens	Nea Smyrni
17:15	Kampantais 16'	summary		Stadium: Nea Smyrni Stadium; Attendance: 2,812

7 October 2012 Round 6	PAS Giannina	1 - 2	Panionios	Ioannina
16:00	Ilić 2'	summary	Goundoulakis 36' (pen.); Lambropoulos 71'	Stadium: Zosimades Stadium; Attendance: 1,438

20 October 2012 Round 7	Panionios	0 - 1	Kerkyra	Nea Smyrni
17:15		summary	Karalis 71'	Stadium: Nea Smyrni Stadium; Attendance: 2,005

27 October 2012 Round 8	Panthrakikos	1 - 2	Panionios	Komotini
17:15	Munafo 59'	summary	Aravidis 18', 87'	Stadium: Komotini Municipal Stadium; Attendance: 762

4 November 2012 Round 9	Panionios	1 - 2	PAOK	Nea Smyrni
17:15	Aravidis 56'	summary	Athanasiadis 39' (pen.), 42'	Stadium: Nea Smyrni Stadium; Attendance: 3,953

11 November 2012 Round 10	Atromitos	1 - 0	Panionios	Peristeri
15:00	Karagounis 30'	summary		Stadium: Peristeri Stadium; Attendance: 2,693

17 November 2012 Round 11	Panionios	4 - 0	Platanias	Nea Smyrni
17:15	Argyropoulos 5' (o.g.); Rokas 17'; Aravidis 41'; Dounis 73'	summary		Stadium: Nea Smyrni Stadium; Attendance: 1,357

25 November 2012 Round 12	Asteras Tripolis	2 - 1	Panionios	Tripoli
17:15	De Blasis 1'; Usero 39'	summary	Kolovos 82'	Stadium: Asteras Tripolis Stadium; Attendance: 2,010

2 December 2012 Round 13	Panionios	1 - 2	Panathinaikos	Nea Smyrni
17:15	Dounis 78'	summary	Petropoulos 24'; Vyntra 28'	Stadium: Nea Smyrni Stadium; Attendance: 2,981

9 December 2012 Round 14	Skoda Xanthi	4 - 0	Panionios	Xanthi
17:15	Marin 31'; Goutas 38'; Onwuachi 41', 80'	summary		Stadium: Skoda Xanthi Arena; Attendance: 250

15 December 2012 Round 15	Panionios	1 - 2	Olympiacos	Nea Smyrni
19:30	Aravidis 25'	summary	Spyropoulos 30' (o.g.); Djebbour 82'	Stadium: Nea Smyrni Stadium; Attendance: 1,991

6 January 2013 Round 16	Aris	2 - 1	Panionios	Thessaloniki
15:00	Aggeloudis 29'; Aganzo 79'	summary	Dounis 42'	Stadium: Kleanthis Vikelidis Stadium; Attendance: 5,306

13 January 2013 Round 17	Panionios	1 - 1	Veria	Nea Smyrni
17:15	Kampantais 57'	summary	Costly 90'	Stadium: Nea Smyrni Stadium; Attendance: 1,390

19 January 2013 Round 18	OFI	2 - 1	Panionios	Heraklion
17:15	Labropoulos 43'; Perogamvrakis 47'	summary	Aravidis 88'	Stadium: Theodoros Vardinogiannis Stadium; Attendance: 1,883

26 January 2013 Round 19	Panionios	2 - 1	Levadiakos	Nea Smyrni
17:15	Samaris 28'; Goundoulakis 79'	summary	Vasileiou 42'	Stadium: Nea Smyrni Stadium; Attendance: 972

2 February 2013 Round 20	AEK Athens	1 - 0	Panionios	Marousi
17:15	Guerreiro 12'	summary		Stadium: Olympic Stadium; Attendance: 11,929

10 February 2013 Round 21	Panionios	0 - 1	PAS Giannina	Nea Smyrni
15:00		summary	Ilić 18'	Stadium: Nea Smyrni Stadium; Attendance: 1,686

16 February 2013 Round 22	Kerkyra	2 - 1	Panionios	Corfu
17:15	Gesios 38', 82'	summary	Kolovos 7'	Stadium: Kerkyra Stadium; Attendance: 239

24 February 2013 Round 23	Panionios	2 - 0	Panthrakikos	Nea Smyrni
17:15	Samaris 35'; Kampantais 42'	summary		Stadium: Nea Smyrni Stadium; Attendance: 1,794

3 March 2013 Round 24	PAOK	4 - 2	Panionios	Thessaloniki
17:15	Kace 31'; Salpingidis 50'; Katsouranis 80'; Vukić 87'	summary	Andralas 34'; Goundoulakis 63' (pen.)	Stadium: Toumba Stadium; Attendance: 11,564

11 March 2013 Round 25	Panionios	1 - 0	Atromitos	Nea Smyrni
19:30	Kampantais 58'	summary		Stadium: Nea Smyrni Stadium; Attendance: 1,994

17 March 2013 Round 26	Platanias	2 - 1	Panionios	Platanias
17:15	Tetteh 20'; Anastasakos 76'	summary	Aravidis 56'	Stadium: Perivolia Municipal; Attendance: 2,107

1 April 2013 Round 27	Panionios	2 - 1	Asteras Tripolis	Nea Smyrni
19:30	Samaris 11', 64'	summary	De Blasis 66'	Stadium: Nea Smyrni Stadium; Attendance: 2,101

7 April 2013 Round 28	Panathinaikos	0 - 0	Panionios	Athens
19:30		summary		Stadium: Olympic Stadium; Attendance: 5,246

14 April 2013 Round 29	Panionios	3 - 3	Skoda Xanthi	Nea Smyrni
19:00	Aravidis 32'; Kolovos 49'; Kouloucheris 88'	summary	Mantalos 4', 52'; Marcelinho 85' (pen.)	Stadium: Nea Smyrni; Attendance: 1,356

21 April 2013 Round 30	Olympiacos	2 - 1	Panionios	Piraeus
19:00	Mitroglou 12'; Papadopoulos 72'	summary	Samaris 20'	Stadium: Karaiskakis Stadium; Attendance: 29,463

=== Greek Cup ===
28 November 2012 3rd Round	Fostiras	1 - 0	Panionios	Tavros
14:30	Kampas 34'	summary		Stadium: Spyros Yalabidis Stadium

19 December 2012 3rd Round	Panionios	2 - 1	Fostiras	Nea Smyrni
20:00	Dounis 10', 22'	summary	Kampas 77'	Stadium: Nea Smyrni

Fostiras 2-2 Panionios. Fostiras won on away goals.

== Top goalscorers ==
8 goals

- (Greece) Christos Aravidis (8 in Super League)

5 goals

- (Greece) Markos Dounis (3 in Super League, 2 in Greek Cup)
- (Greece) Andreas Samaris (5 in Super League)

4 goals

- (Greece) Leonidas Kampantais (4 in Super League)

3 goals

- (Greece) Fanouris Goundoulakis (3 in Super League)
- (Greece) Dimitris Kolovos (3 in Super League)

2 goals

- (Greece) Vasilis Lambropoulos (2 in Super League)

1 goal

- (Greece) Kostas Mendrinos (1 in Super League)
- (Greece) Efstathios Rokas (1 in Super League)
- (Greece) Paraskevas Andralas (1 in Super League)
- (Greece) Efthimios Kouloucheris (1 in Super League)
