= 2013–14 Panionios F.C. season =

Panionios
2013–2014 season
- Chairman: Vasileios Tsavalos
- Manager: Nikos Pantelis
- Stadium: Nea Smyrni Stadium, Athens
- Super League Greece: Not Started
- Greek Cup: Not Started
- Top goalscorer: League: None Yet; All: None Yet
- Highest home attendance: None Yet
- Lowest home attendance: None Yet
- Average home league attendance: None Yet
Home colours	Away colours	Third colours

The 2013–14 season was Panionios' 123rd season in existence and its 53rd in the top tier of the modern Greek football league system. They also competed in the Greek Cup. It was the first season without player (for 9,5 years) and captain Fanouris Goundoulakis, who refused to renew his contract.

The club's U17 and U20 competed in their respective leagues.

== Players ==
=== Current squad ===
No.	Name	Nationality	Position (s)	Date of birth (age)	Signed from	Notes
Goalkeepers
1	Nikos Papadopoulos	(Greece)	GK	11 April 1990 (23)	(Germany) Fortuna Düsseldorf	
22	Giannis Anestis	(Greece)	GK	9 March 1991 (22)	Panionios Academies	
31	Nikos Giannakopoulos	(Greece)	GK	19 February 1993 (20)	(Italy) Udinese Calcio	
Defenders
2	Amiri Kurdi	(Saudi Arabia)	RB/ DM	11 September 1991 (22)	Panionios Academies	
4	Vasilios Lampropoulos	(Greece)	CB	31 March 1990 (23)	(Greece) Ethnikos Asteras	
6	Alexandros Kouros	(Albania)	LB/ CB	21 August 1993 (19)	Panionios Academies	
11	Efthimios Kouloucheris	(Greece)	CB	10 March 1981 (32)	(Greece) Aris	
24	Manos Zacharakis	(Greece)	RB	10 August 1992 (21)	(Greece) OFI	
25	Xenofon Panos	(Greece)	RB	25 August 1989 (23)	(Greece) Thrasyvoulos	
29	Nikos Pantidos	(Greece)	CB	19 April 1991 (22)	(Greece) Aris	
33	Dimitris Toskas	(Greece)	CB	13 March 1991 (22)	(Greece) Pierikos	
Midfielders
7	Dimitris Kolovos	(Greece)	AM	27 April 1993	(Greece) PAS Oropos	
8	Vasilis Bouzas	(Greece)	MF	30 June 1993	Panionios Academies	
17	Nikolaos Kaltsas	(Greece)	MF	28 June 1990	(Greece) Kallithea	
20	Andreas Lasnik	(Austria)	MF	9 November 1983	(Netherlands) Breda	
23	Markos Dounis	(Albania)	MF	9 May 1992	Panionios Academies	
27	Konstantinos Korkontzelos	(Greece)	MF	12 December 1992	(Greece) Proodeftiki	
50	Kostas Panagiotoudis	(Greece)	MF	3 December 1994	(Greece) PAOK	
82	Pavlos Mitropoulos	(Greece)	DM	4 April 1990	(Greece) Panetolikos	
15	Charis Kostakis	(Greece)	MF	12 July 1990 (23)	(Slovakia) NK Domžale	
Forwards
9	Leonidas Kampantais	(Greece)	ST	8 March 1982	(Greece) OFI	
13	Christos Aravidis	(Greece)	RW/ST	13 March 1987	(Greece) Doxa Drama	
19	Mattheos Maroukakis	(Greece)	ST	4 January 1990	(Greece) Kallithea	
21	Kostas Stavrothanasopoulos	(Greece)	FW	6 February 1992	Panionios Academies	
99	Apostolos Giannou	(Australia)	FW	25 January 1990	(Greece) PAOK	
Manager
	Konstantinos Panagopoulos	(Greece)		6 October 1959	(Greece) Kallithea	

=== Squad information ===
N	Pos.	Nat.	Name	Age	EU	Since	App	Goals	Ends	Transfer fee	Notes
1	GK	(Greece)	Papadopoulos	36	EU	2013	1				
22	GK	(Greece)	Anestis	35	EU	2011	8				
31	GK	(Greece)	Giannakopoulos	33	EU	2012	13				
81	GK	(Greece)	Sachsanidis	37	EU	2013					
24	RB	(Greece)	Zacharakis	34	EU	2013	5		2016		
25	RB	(Greece)	Panos	37	EU	2013	3		2015		
5	CB	(Greece)	Avlonitis	36	EU	2011	18				
11	CB	(Greece)	Kouloucheris	45	EU	2012	9				
29	CB	(Greece)	Pantidos	35	EU	2013	10		2016		
4	CB	(Greece)	Lampropoulos	36	EU	2012	17	1	2016		
33	CB	(Greece)	Toskas	35	EU	2013	1				
6	LB	(Albania)	Kouros	33	EU	2011	19				
17	DM	(Greece)	Kaltsas	37	EU	2013	10		2015		
2	RM	(Saudi Arabia)	Kurdi	35	EU	2009	19		2015		
10	CM	(Greece)	Mendrinos	41	EU	2012	14	1			
8	CM	(Greece)	Bouzas	33	EU	2011	3				
50	CM	(Greece)	Panagiotoudis	31	EU	2013	11				
23	LM	(Albania)	Dounis	34	EU	2011	17	1			
27	MF	(Greece)	Korkontzelos	33	EU	2013			2014		
13	RW	(Greece)	Aravidis	39	EU	2012	19	8			
19	CF	(Greece)	Maroukakis	36	EU	2013	3		2016		
9	CF	(Greece)	Kampantais	44	EU	2012	15	3			
7	LW	(Greece)	Kolovos	33	EU	2010	18	3			
20	MF	(Austria)	Lasnik	43	EU	2013	14	1			
26	MF	(Uruguay)	Rivero	41	EU	2013	2				
21	FW	(Greece)	Stavrothanasopoulos	34	EU	2011					
82	MF	(Greece)	Mitropoulos	36	EU	2013	18				
73	DF	(Greece)	Liolios	34	EU	2013					
15	MF	(Greece)	Kostakis	36	EU	2013					
99	FW	(Australia)	Giannou	36	EU	2013	14	2			
35	FW	(Greece)	Beglektsis	31	EU	2013					

== Transfers ==
=== In ===
Period	Pos.	Name	From	Fee
Summer	DF	(Albania) Kosmas Gezos	(Greece) AO Glyfada	Return From Loan
Summer	DF	(Greece) Pantelis Pozidis	(Greece) Vyzas Megaron	Return From Loan
Summer	FW	(Greece) Kostas Stavrothanasopoulos	(Greece) Thrasyvoulos Fylis	Return From Loan
Summer	FW	(Greece) Panagiotis Kalogiannis	(Greece) Thrasyvoulos Fylis	Return From Loan
Summer	FW	(Greece) Mattheos Maroukakis	(Greece) Kallithea	Free
Summer	DF	(Greece) Manolis Zacharakis	(Greece) OFI	Free
Summer	DF	(Greece) Xenofon Panos	(Greece) Thrasyvoulos Fylis	Free
Summer	MF	(Greece) Konstantinos Korkontzelos	(Greece) Proodeftiki	Free
Summer	MF	(Greece) Nikos Kaltsas	(Greece) Kallithea	Free
Summer	MF	(Greece) Pavlos Mitropoulos	(Greece) Panetolikos	On Loan
Summer	MF	(Austria) Andreas Lasnik	(Netherlands) NAC Breda	Free
Summer	DF	(Greece) Nikos Liolios	(Greece) Vyzas	Free
Summer	MF	(Uruguay) Claudio Rivero	(Uruguay) Fénix	Free
Summer	GK	(Greece) Filippos Sachsanidis	(Greece) OFI	Free
Summer	GK	(Greece) Nikolaos Papadopoulos	(Germany) Fortuna Düsseldorf	Free
Summer	MF	(Greece) Charis Kostakis	(Slovakia) Domžale	Free
Summer	FW	(Australia) Apostolos Giannou	(Greece) PAOK	Free

=== Out ===
Period	Pos.	Name	To	Fee
Summer	MF	(Greece) Fanouris Goundoulakis	(Greece) Platanias	Free
Summer	GK	(Greece) Kostas Peristeridis	(Greece) Platanias	Free
Summer	DF	(Greece) Paraskevas Andralas	(Greece) Acharnaikos	Free
Summer	DF	(Greece) Efstathios Rokas	(Greece) Olympiacos Volos	Free
Summer	FW	(Nigeria) Emmanuel Okoye	(Cyprus) Aris Limassol	Free
Summer	MF	(Greece) Andreas Samaris	(Greece) Olympiacos	Free
Summer	MF	(Greece) Dimitris Kolovos	(Greece) Olympiacos	Free
Summer	MF	(Greece) Konstantinos Ganotis	-	-
Summer	MF	(Greece) Angelos-Lambros Spanos	(Greece) Vyzas Megaron	Free
Summer	MF	(Greece) Konstantinos Klis	(Greece) Egaleo	Free
Summer	DF	(Albania) Kosmas Gezos	(Greece) Glyfada	Free
Summer	FW	(Greece) Alexandros Smyrlis	(Greece) Fostiras	Free
Summer	DF	(Sweden) Dionysis Giannoulis	(Greece) Fostiras	Free
Summer	DF	(Greece) Christos Kartsambas	(Greece) Pierikos	Free
Summer	MF	(Georgia (country)) Michail Tsamourlidis	(Greece) Nea Ionia	Free
Summer	DF	(Greece) Georgios Zygogiannis	(Greece) AEK Larnaca	Free
Summer	FW	(Greece) Panagiotis Kalogiannis	(Greece) Vyzas Megara	Free
Summer	MF	(Greece) Dimitris Aslanidis	(Greece) Asteras Magoulas	Free
Summer	MF	(Greece) Christos Kontochristos	(Greece) Lamia	Free
Summer	DF	(Greece) Pantelis Pozidis	(Greece) Kallithea	Free
Winter	DF	(Greece) Tasos Avlonitis	(Greece) Olympiacos	€264,000
Winter	MF	(Greece) Kostas Mendrinos	(Greece) Platanias	Free
Winter	DF	(Greece) Nikolaos Liolios	-	-
Winter	GK	(Greece) Filippos Sachsanidis	-	-
Winter	MF	(Uruguay) Claudio Rivero	-	-
Winter	FW	(Greece) Mattheos Maroukakis	(Greece) Ionikos	-

== Matches ==
=== Friendlies ===
14 July 2013 Tournament (3-5 Pigadia)	Panionios	6 – 1	P.A.O.K. Alexandreia	(3-5 Pigadia)Naousa
	Dounis 30', 33'; Kampantais 51'; Lampropoulos 78'; Panos 81'; Stavrothanasopoulos 90+'		Kitsas

18 July 2013 Tournament (3-5 Pigadia)	Panionios	0 – 1	Veria	(3-5 Pigadia)Naousa
		Summary	Manos 87'

22 July 2013 Tournament (3-5 Pigadia)	Panionios	1 – 1	Ergotelis	(3-5 Pigadia)Naousa
	Lampropoulos 77'		Chanti 62'

26 July 2013 Tournament (3-5 Pigadia)	Panionios	0 – 0	Apollon Smyrnis	(3-5 Pigadia)Naousa

3 August 2013 Friendly	Levadiakos	0 – 0	Panionios	Livadeia

7 August 2013 Friendly	Ionikos	1 – 1	Panionios	Nikaia, Attica
	Koutsogiannopoulos 79'		Maroukakis 42'

10 August 2013 Friendly	Panionios	1 – 1	Panegialios	Nea Smyrni
	Kouros 24'		Rahim 57'

6 September 2013 Friendly	Panelefsiniakos	0 – 0	Panionios	Municipal Stadium Of Eleusina

7 May 2014 Friendly	Panionios	2 – 0	Levadiakos	Nea Smyrni
	Aravidis 11', 17'

=== Super League ===
18 August 2013 Round 1	OFI	0 – 0	Panionios	Heraklion
19:15		Summary	Lampropoulos (red card) 84'	Stadium: Theodoros Vardinogiannis Stadium; Attendance: 4,812; Referee: Georgios Kizas

24 August 2013 Round 2	Panionios	3 – 0	Panathinaikos	Nea Smyrni
21:30	Aravidis 40', 88'; Kolovos 71'	Summary	Mendes da Silva (red card) 84'	Stadium: Nea Smyrni Stadium; Attendance: 1,998; Referee: Dimitrios Styliaras

1 September 2013 Round 3	PAOK	4 – 1	Panionios	Thessaloniki
19:15	Salpingidis 31'; Stoch 54', 84' (pen.); Kitsiou 76'	Summary	Aravidis 81' (pen.)	Stadium: Toumba Stadium; Referee: Ioannis Delfakis

15 September 2013 Round 4	Panionios	1 – 1	Panthrakikos	Nea Smyrni
18:15	Lampropoulos 86'	Summary	Igor 36'	Stadium: Nea Smyrni Stadium; Referee: Athanasios Giachos

22 September 2013 Round 5	Ergotelis	1 – 1	Panionios	Heraklion
18:15	Bambam 68'	Summary	Aravidis 90+1'	Stadium: Pankritio Stadium; Attendance: 1,285; Referee: Alexandros Dimitropoulos

28 September 2013 Round 6	Panionios	0 – 2	Olympiacos	Nea Smyrni
20:30		Summary	Weiss 61'; Saviola 75'	Stadium: Nea Smyrni Stadium; Attendance: 2,010; Referee: Michail Voskakis

5 October 2013 Round 7	Panionios	1 – 2	Aris	Nea Smyrni
20:30	Kampantais 58'	Summary	Aganzo 62'; Udoji 88'	Stadium: Nea Smyrni Stadium; Referee: Dimitrios Styliaras

21 October 2013 Round 8	PAS Giannina	0 – 1	Panionios	Ioannina
19:30		Summary	Dounis 37'	Stadium: Zosimades Stadium; Attendance: 1,815; Referee: Charalampos Kalogeropoulos

27 October 2013 Round 9	Panionios	2 – 1	Apollon Smyrnis	Nea Smyrni
17:15	Kolovos 63', 78'	Summary	Mingas 21'	Stadium: Nea Smyrni Stadium; Attendance: 1,319; Referee: Stavros Tritsonis

3 November 2013 Round 10	AEL Kalloni	3 – 2	Panionios	Thessaloniki
15:00	Marcelo 23'; Leozinho 75'; Jonan García 79'	Summary	Giannou 13'; Aravidis 57'	Stadium: Kleanthis Vikelidis Stadium; Referee: Marios Lampropoulos

10 November 2013 Round 11	Panionios	2 – 1	Atromitos	Nea Smyrni
15:00	Giannou 5'; Aravidis 38' (pen.)	Summary	Dimoutsos 70'	Stadium: Nea Smyrni Stadium; Attendance: 1,247; Referee: Georgios Daskalopoulos

25 November 2013 Round 12	Levadiakos	2 – 0	Panionios	Livadeia
19:30	Martins 14'; Mantzios 64'; Georgiou (red card) 73'	Summary		Stadium: Levadia Municipal Stadium; Referee: Ioannis Kampaxis

1 December 2013 Round 13	Panionios	0 – 0	Skoda Xanthi	Nea Smyrni
17:15		Summary		Stadium: Nea Smyrni Stadium; Attendance: Dimitrios Thanos

9 December 2013 Round 14	Panetolikos	0 – 0	Panionios	Agrinio
19:30		Summary		Stadium: Panetolikos Stadium; Attendance: Anastasios Kakos

15 December 2013 Round 15	Asteras Tripolis	1 – 0	Panionios	Tripoli
17:15	Barrales	Summary		Stadium: Theodoros Kolokotronis Stadium; Attendance: Georgios Liachoudis

19 December 2013 Round 16	Panionios	2 – 1	Veria	Nea Smyrni
17:15	Georgiadis 22' (o.g.); Aravidis 84'	Summary	Ben 45+2'; Sissoko (red card) 77'	Stadium: Nea Smyrni Stadium; Referee: Michail Koukoulakis

22 December 2013 Round 17	Platanias	1 – 0	Panionios	Chania
17:15	Tetteh 65'	Summary		Stadium: Perivolia Municipal Stadium; Referee: Alexandros Dimitropoulos

5 January 2014 Round 18	Panionios	0 – 0	OFI	Nea Smyrni
17:15		Summary		Stadium: Nea Smyrni Stadium; Attendance: 938

11 January 2014 Round 19	Panathinaikos	1 – 0	Panionios	Athens
19:30	Pranjić 16'	Summary		Stadium: Leoforos Alexandras Stadium; Attendance: 7,658; Referee: M.Daskalopoulos

18 January 2014 Round 20	Panionios	2 – 0	PAOK	Nea Smyrni
19:30	Aravidis 6'; Lasnik 61'	Summary		Stadium: Nea Smyrni Stadium; Referee: Stavros Mantalos

26 January 2014 Round 21	Panthrakikos	4 – 1	Panionios	Komotini
17:15	Igor 16'; Romeu 59'; Hasomeris 63'; Tzanis 68'	Summary	Dounis 27'	Stadium: Komotini Municipal Stadium; Referee: Anastasios Kakos

2 February 2014 Round 22	Panionios	0 – 1	Ergotelis	Nea Smyrni
17:15		Summary	Diamantakos 86'	Stadium: Nea Smyrni Stadium

5 February 2014 Round 23	Olympiacos	2 – 0	Panionios	Piraeus
17:15	Samaris 12'; Šćepović 18'	Summary		Stadium: Karaiskakis Stadium; Referee: Stavros Tritsonis

10 February 2014 Round 24	Aris	1 – 0	Panionios	Thessaloniki
19:30	Aganzo 58'	Summary		Stadium: Kleanthis Vikelidis Stadium; Referee: Ioannis Topouzis

16 February 2014 Round 25	Panionios	2 – 0	PAS Giannina	Nea Smyrni
17:15	Kolovos 22'; Mitropoulos (yellow card) 61'; Dounis 77'; Stavrothanasopoulos (yellow card) 79'	Summary	Lila (yellow card) 45'; Tzimopoulos (yellow card) 64' (yellow-red card); Korovesis (yellow card) 78'	Stadium: Nea Smyrni Stadium; Attendance: 1,108; Referee: (Greece) Georgios Liahoudis

22 February 2014 Round 26	Apollon Smyrnis	1 – 2	Panionios	Rizoupoli
17:15	Ambrose 16'	Summary	Lasnik 31', 38' (pen.)	Stadium: Georgios Kamaras Stadium; Referee: Apostolos Abarkiolis

2 March 2014 Round 27	Panionios	1 – 1	AEL Kalloni	Nea Smyrni
17:15	Kolovos 54'	Summary	Anastasiadis 70'	Stadium: Nea Smyrni Stadium; Attendance: Anastasios Papapetrou; Referee: 711

9 March 2014 Round 28	Atromitos	4 – 0	Panionios	Peristeri
15:00	D. Papadopoulos 3', 26'; Nastos 22'; Umbides 63'	Summary		Stadium: Peristeri Stadium; Referee: Ioannis Delfakis

16 March 2014 Round 29	Panionios	4 – 2	Levadiakos	Nea Smyrni
17:15	Aravidis 24'; Mitropoulos 56'; Kolovos 57', 74'	Summary	Martins 75'; Giantsis 86'	Stadium: Nea Smyrni Stadium; Referee: Stavros Tritsonis

23 March 2014 Round 30	Skoda Xanthi	2 – 0	Panionios	Xanthi
17:15	Soltani 60'; Triadis 72'	Summary		Stadium: Skoda Xanthi Arena; Attendance: 1,022; Referee: Georgios Daskalopoulos

26 March 2014 Round 31	Panionios	1 – 1	Panetolikos	Nea Smyrni
17:15	Aravidis 29'	Summary	Nicolás Martínez 69'	Stadium: Nea Smyrni Stadium

29 March 2014 Round 32	Panionios	3 – 0	Asteras Tripolis	Nea Smyrni
17:15	Giannou 6'; Aravidis 29'; Dounis 42'	Summary		Stadium: Nea Smyrni Stadium; Referee: Stavros Mantalos

6 April 2014 Round 33	Veria	2 – 1	Panionios	Veria
19:00	Ben; Esmaël	Summary	Aravidis	Stadium: Veria Stadium

13 April 2014 Round 34	Panionios	0 – 0	Platanias	Nea Smyrni
19:00		Summary		Stadium: Nea Smyrni Stadium; Attendance: Athanasios Giachos

=== Greek Cup ===
Second Round

25 September 2013	Panionios	3 – 1	Apollon Kalamarias	Nea Smyrni
20:30	Kampantais 31', 37'; Mendrinos 84'	Summary	Ventzios 35'	Stadium: Nea Smyrni Stadium; Referee: Georgios Foukakis

30 October 2013	Apollon Kalamarias	0 – 0	Panionios	Thessaloniki
15:30		Summary		Stadium: Kalamaria Stadium

Third Round

8 January 2014	Aiginiakos	1 – 0	Panionios	Aiginio
17:30	Giatzitzoglou 66' (pen.)	Summary		Stadium: Municipal Stadium of Aiginio

23 January 2014	Panionios	3 – 0	Aiginiakos	Nea Smyrni
20:00	Giannou 17'; Lasnik 42'; Kurdi 86'	Summary		Stadium: Nea Smyrni Stadium; Referee: M.Voskakis

Quarter-Finals

29 January 2014	OFI	2 – 0	Panionios	Heraklion, Crete
16:00	Papazoglou 61'; Kalajdžić 65' (pen.)	Summary		Stadium: Theodoros Vardinogiannis Stadium; Referee: Dimitrios Thanos

13 February 2014	Panionios	1 – 2	OFI	Nea Smyrni, Athens
17:00	Kolovos 65'	Summary	Makris 63'; Dudu 80'	Stadium: Nea Smyrni Stadium; Referee: Ioannis Kabaxis

== Top goalscorers ==
12 goals

- (Greece) Christos Aravidis (12 in Super League)

6 goals

- (Greece) Dimitris Kolovos (5 in Super League, 1 in Greek Cup)

4 goals

- (Austria) Andreas Lasnik (3 in Super League, 1 in Greek Cup)
- (Australia) Apostolos Giannou (3 in Super League, 1 in Greek Cup)
- (Albania) Markos Dounis (4 in Super League)

3 goals

- (Greece) Leonidas Kampantais (2 in Greek Cup, 1 in Super League)

1 goal

- (Greece) Vasilios Lampropoulos (1 in Super League)
- (Greece) Kostas Mendrinos (1 in Greek Cup)
- (Saudi Arabia) Amiri Kurdi (1 in Greek Cup)
