= 2011–12 Panionios F.C. season =

Panionios
2011–12 season
- Chairman: (Greece) Vasilis Tsavalos
- Manager: (Greece) Apostolos Mantzios
- Stadium: Nea Smyrni Stadium
- Super League Greece: 12th
- Top goalscorer: League: Njazi Kuqi (10); All: Njazi Kuqi (10)
- Highest home attendance: 3,567 vs. Olympiacos (23 October 2011)
- Lowest home attendance: 1,140 vs. Kerkyra (28 January 2012)
- Average home league attendance: 2,101
Home colours	Away colours

The 2011–12 season for association football was Panionios' 51st season in Super League Greece.

They also competed in the Greek Cup.

== Season ==
As of January 2012

Note: Flags indicate national team as defined under FIFA eligibility rules; some limited exceptions apply. Players may hold more than one non-FIFA nationality.

No.	Pos.	Nation	Player
1	GK	GRE	Giannis Siderakis
3	MF	GRE	Konstantinos Klis
4	DF	GRE	Konstantinos Samaropoulos
5	DF	GRE	Tasos Avlonitis
6	DF	NGR	Suleiman Omo
7	FW	GRE	Dimitrios Drosos
8	MF	GRE	Vasilios Rovas
9	FW	FIN	Njazi Kuqi
10	MF	GRE	Konstantinos Mendrinos
11	DF	GRE	Efthimios Kouloucheris
12	DF	ALB	Alexandros Kouros
13	MF	ALB	Kosmas Gezos
15	GK	GRE	Chrisostomos Michailidis
16	FW	GRE	Dimitris Kolovos
17	MF	GRE	Vasilis Bouzas
18	FW	GRE	Alexandros Smyrlis
19	FW	GRE	Andreas Stamatis
20	MF	GRE	Fanouris Goundoulakis (captain)
22	MF	GRE	Andreas Samaris

No.	Pos.	Nation	Player
23	DF	GRE	Dimitris Siovas
24	MF	GRE	Dimitrios Anastasopoulos
25	MF	GRE	Markos Dounis
26	FW	BEL	Patrick Dimbala
27	DF	KSA	Amiri Kurdi
31	DF	GRE	Dimitris Petkakis
32	MF	SRB	Dejan Milovanović
33	FW	GRE	Kostas Stavrothanasopoulos
34	GK	HUN	Krisztián Pogacsics (on loan from Bihor Oradea)
39	FW	NGR	Emmanuel Okoye
40	MF	MLT	André Schembri
50	DF	HAI	Jean-Jacques Pierre
55	DF	POR	Vitorino Antunes (on loan from Roma)
70	FW	AZE	Araz Abdullayev (on loan from Everton)
77	GK	AUT	Jürgen Macho
88	GK	GRE	Giannis Anestis
84	MF	GRE	Efstathios Rokas

== Transfers ==
=== In ===
Time	Pos.	Name	From	Fee
Summer	MF	(Serbia) Dejan Milovanović	(France) Lens	Loan
Summer	DF	(Greece) Dimitris Petkakis	(Greece) Kavala	Free
Summer	FW	(Nigeria) Emmanuel Okoye	(Greece) Vyzas	Free
Summer	GK	(Greece) Giannis Siderakis	(Greece) Thrasyvoulos	Free
Summer	GK	(Greece) Dimitrios Eleftheropoulos	(Greece) Iraklis	Free
Summer	FW	(Finland) Njazi Kuqi	(Finland) TPS Turku	Free
Summer	DF	(Greece) Efstathios Rokas	(Greece) Olympiacos Volos	Free
Summer	FW	(Greece) Dimitris Drosos	(Greece) Kavala	Free
Summer	MF	(Greece) André Schembri	(Greece) Olympiacos Volos	Free
Summer	DF	(Greece) Tasos Avlonitis	(Greece) Kavala	Free
Summer	FW	(Greece) Markos Dounis	(Greece) Panionios U-20	
Summer	DF	(Greece) Georgios Vlachos	(Greece) Panionios U-20	
Summer	DF	(Albania) Alexandros Kouros	(Greece) Panionios U-20	
Summer	MF	(Greece) Vasilis Bouzas	(Greece) Panionios U-20	
Summer	GK	(Greece) Giannis Anestis	(Greece) Panionios U-20	
Summer	FW	(Greece) Andreas Stamatis	(Greece) Panionios U-20	
Summer	MF	(Greece) Alexandros Smyrlis	(Greece) Panionios U-20	
Summer	DF	(Albania) Kosmas Gezos	(Greece) Panionios U-20	
Summer	FW	(Greece) Kostas Stavrothanasopoulos	(Greece) Panionios U-20	
Summer	FW	(Albania) Vasil Shkurti	(Greece) Thrasyvoulos	Return From Loan
Summer	MF	(Uruguay) Fabián Estoyanoff	(Uruguay) Peñarol	Return From Loan
Summer	MF	(Greece) Christos Kontochristos	(Greece) Nafpaktiakos Asteras	Return From Loan
Summer	FW	(Greece) Giannis Loukinas	(Greece) Rouf	Return From Loan
Winter	MF	(Azerbaijan) Araz Abdullayev	(England) Everton	Loan
Winter	MF	(Hungary) Krisztián Pogacsics	(Romania) Bihor Oradea	Loan
Winter	MF	(Portugal) Vitorino Antunes	(Italy) Roma	Loan
Winter	GK	(Greece) Chrisostomos Michailidis	(Greece) Larissa	Free
Winter	DF	(Greece) Efthimios Kouloucheris	(Greece) Aris	Free
Winter	MF	(Greece) Vasilios Rovas	(Greece) OFI	Free
Winter	MF	(Greece) Kostas Mendrinos	(Greece) Panachaiki	Free
Winter	DF	(Haiti) Jean-Jacques Pierre	(France) Nantes	Free
Winter	FW	(Democratic Republic of the Congo) Patrick Dimbala	-	Free
Winter	DF	(Greece) Kostas Samaropoulos	(Greece) Aetos Skydra	Free

=== Out ===
Season	Pos.	Name	To	Fee
Summer	FW	(Greece) Kostas Mitroglou	(Greece) Olympiacos	End of Loan
Summer	DF	(Greece) Georgios Galitsios	(Greece) Olympiacos	End of Loan
Summer	FW	(Czech Republic) Václav Svěrkoš	(France) Sochaux	End of Loan
Summer	DF	(Greece) Giannis Kontoes	(Greece) AEK Athens	Free
Summer	DF	(France) Cédric Varrault	(France) Dijon	Free
Summer	MF	(Denmark) Kasper Risgård	(Denmark) Silkeborg IF	Free
Summer	MF	(France) Maxime Partouche	(France) US Créteil	Free
Summer	GK	(Germany) Markus Pröll	End of Career	
Summer	FW	(Greece) Giannis Loukinas	(Greece) Niki Volos	Free
Summer	FW	(Albania) Vasil Shkurti	(Greece) Platanias	Free
Summer	DF	(Czech Republic) Martin Latka	(Czech Republic) Slavia Prague	Free
Summer	FW	(Algeria) Mohamed Chalali	(Scotland) Aberdeen	€48,400
Summer	MF	(Greece) Christos Kontochristos	(Greece) Niki Volos	Loan
Winter	MF	(Croatia) Davor Kukec	(Czech Republic) Baník Ostrava	Free
Winter	MF	(Uruguay) Fabián Estoyanoff	(Uruguay) Peñarol	Free
Winter	MF	(Ghana) Bennard Kumordzi	(France) Dijon FCO	Free
Winter	FW	(Spain) Sito Riera	(Ukraine) Chornomorets	Free
Winter	GK	(Greece) Dimitrios Eleftheropoulos	End of Career	
Winter	DF	(Bosnia and Herzegovina) Edin Cocalić	(Israel) Maccabi Haifa	€308,000
Winter	DF	(Georgia (country)) Dato Kvirkvelia	(Cyprus) Anorthosis	Free
Winter	DF	(Sweden) Markus Jonsson	(Norway) SK Brann	Free
Winter	GK	(Greece) Leonidas Panagopoulos	–	–
Winter	FW	(Croatia) Boško Balaban	(Malaysia) Selangor FA	Free
Winter	GK	(Greece) Giannis Anestis	(Greece) Proodeftiki	Loan

== Matches ==
=== Super League ===
28 August 2011 1	Panionios	2–2	Ergotelis	Nea Smyrni
17:15	Riera 11'; Kumordzi 72'	summary	Fragoulakis 52'; Júnior 90'	Stadium: Nea Smyrni Stadium; Attendance: 1,209; Referee: Athanasios Giachos

10 September 2011 2	Panetolikos	0–1	Panionios	Agrinio
17:15		summary	Kuqi 11'	Stadium: Panetolikos Stadium; Attendance: 5,320; Referee: Dimitrios Kirkos

18 September 2011 3	Panionios	1–2	PAOK	Nea Smyrni
17:15	Estoyanoff 35'	summary	Athanasiadis 16'; Salpingidis 64'	Stadium: Nea Smyrni Stadium; Attendance: 3,493; Referee: Petros Konstantineas

24 September 2011 4	Kerkyra	0–3	Panionios	Kerkyra
17:15		summary	Kuqi 34', 78'; Goundoulakis 83'	Stadium: Kerkyra Stadium; Attendance: 842; Referee: Dimitris Thanos

2 October 2011 5	Panionios	0–1	AEK Athens	Nea Smyrni
17:15		summary	Manolas 90+3'	Stadium: Nea Smyrni Stadium; Attendance: 3,534; Referee: Georgios Daskalopoulos

16 October 2011 6	PAS Giannina	0–0	Panionios	Ioannina
15:00		summary		Stadium: Zosimades Stadium; Attendance: 2,575; Referee: Praxitelis Zachariadis

23 October 2011 7	Panionios	0–3	Olympiacos	Nea Smyrni
17:15		summary	Djebbour 33', 68'; Mirallas 43'	Stadium: Nea Smyrni Stadium; Attendance: 3,567; Referee: Ilias Spathas

29 October 2011 8	Atromitos	2–1	Panionios	Peristeri
17:15	Anastasakos 61', 64'	summary	Schembri 57'	Stadium: Peristeri Stadium; Attendance: 2,954; Referee: Dimitrios Kirkos

5 November 2011 9	Panionios	1–3	OFI	Nea Smyrni
17:15	Kuqi 66'	summary	Šišić 26', 80'; Mantzios 36'	Stadium: Nea Smyrni Stadium; Attendance: 1,959; Referee: Dimitrios Thanos

20 November 2011 10	Doxa Drama	0–0	Panionios	Thessaloniki
15:00		summary		Stadium: Kaftanzoglio Stadium; Attendance: 1,384; Referee: Spyridon Selimos

27 November 2011 11	Panionios	2–1	Aris	Nea Smyrni
17:15	Schembri 39'; Kuqi 58'	summary	Cesarec 73'	Stadium: Nea Smyrni Stadium; Attendance: 1,684; Referee: Stavros Tritsonis

4 December 2011 12	Levadiakos	0–0	Panionios	Livadeia
17:15		summary		Stadium: Levadia Municipal Stadium; Attendance: 1,136; Referee: Anastasios Kakos

11 December 2011 13	Panionios	1–2	Panathinaikos	Nea Smyrni
17:15	Schembri 8'	summary	Leto 62' (pen.); Katsouranis 74'	Stadium: Nea Smyrni Stadium; Attendance: 3,074; Referee: Petros Konstantineas

17 December 2011 14	Skoda Xanthi	1–0	Panionios	Xanthi
19:30	Markovski 26'	summary		Stadium: Skoda Xanthi Arena; Attendance: 1,074; Referee: Georgios Kominis

3 January 2012 15	Panionios	2–0	Asteras Tripolis	Nea Smyrni
17:15	Kolovos 42'; Goundoulakis 77'	summary		Stadium: Nea Smyrni Stadium; Attendance: 1,633; Referee: Michail Koukoulakis

7 January 2012 16	Ergotelis	1–0	Panionios	Heraklion
17:15	Leal 15' (pen.)	summary		Stadium: Pankritio Stadium; Attendance: 1,008; Referee: Dimitris Styliaras

15 January 2012 17	Panionios	1–0	Panetolikos	Nea Smyrni
17:15	Kuqi 53'	summary		Stadium: Nea Smyrni Stadium; Attendance: 1,825; Referee: Charalampos Kalogeropoulos

21 January 2012 18	PAOK	1–0	Panionios	Thessaloniki
19:30	Athanasiadis 10'	summary		Stadium: Toumba Stadium; Attendance: 7,038; Referee: Michail Voskakis

28 January 2012 19	Panionios	2–0	Kerkyra	Nea Smyrni
17:15	Kuqi 71'; Schembri 88'	summary		Stadium: Nea Smyrni Stadium; Attendance: 1,140; Referee: Ioannis Delfakis

5 February 2012 20	AEK Athens	1–0	Panionios	Marousi
17:15	Kafes 27'	summary		Stadium: Athens Olympic Stadium; Attendance: 4,344; Referee: Dimitrios Thanos

11 February 2012 21	Panionios	0–0	PAS Giannina	Nea Smyrni
17:15		summary		Stadium: Nea Smyrni Stadium; Attendance: 1,576; Referee: Charalampos Kalogeropoulos

19 February 2012 22	Olympiacos	2–0	Panionios	Piraeus
17:15	Makoun 41'; Diogo 50'	summary		Stadium: Karaiskakis Stadium; Attendance: 18,173; Referee: Ioannis Delfakis

3 March 2012 23	Panionios	1–2	Atromitos	Nea Smyrni
17:15	Dimbala 80'	summary	Mitroglou 29', 67'	Stadium: Nea Smyrni Stadium; Attendance: 1,763; Referee: Dimitrios Thanos

10 March 2012 24	OFI	0–1	Panionios	Heraklion
17:15		summary	Pierre 83'	Stadium: Theodoros Vardinogiannis Stadium; Attendance: 1,874; Referee: Gerasimos Ditsos

18 March 2012 25	Panionios	2–0	Doxa Drama	Nea Smyrni
15:00	Antunes 6'; Dimbala 13'	summary		Stadium: Nea Smyrni Stadium; Attendance: 1,561; Referee: Praxitelis Zachariadis

24 March 2012 26	Aris	4–2	Panionios	Thessaloniki
17:15	Faty 33'; Umbides 71'; Triantafyllakos 75'; Neto 78'	summary	Kuqi 39', 63'	Stadium: Kleanthis Vikelidis Stadium; Attendance: 7,295; Referee: Anastasios Kakos

1 April 2012 27	Panionios	2–0	Levadiakos	Nea Smyrni
19:00	Kuqi 59' (pen.); Kurdi 90'	summary		Stadium: Nea Smyrni Stadium; Attendance: 2,047; Referee: Stavros Tritsonis

8 April 2012 28	Panathinaikos	3–0	Panionios	Athens
19:00	Christodoulopoulos 47'; Petropoulos 84', 88'	summary		Stadium: Olympic Stadium (Athens); Referee: Athanasios Giachos

18 April 2012 29	Panionios	1–1	Skoda Xanthi	Nea Smyrni
19:00	Omo 72'	summary	Vasilakakis 25'	Stadium: Nea Smyrni Stadium; Attendance: 1,453; Referee: Ilias Spathas

22 April 2012 30	Asteras Tripolis	2–0	Panionios	Tripoli
19:00	Bakasetas 45'; Rayo 71'	summary		Stadium: Asteras Tripolis Stadium; Attendance: 1,295; Referee: Anastasios Kakos

=== Greek Cup ===
20 December 2011 Fourth	AEL Kalloni	2–3 (a.e.t.)	Panionios	Mytilene
14:00	Tziortziopoulos 6'; Manousos 42'	summary	Siovas 15'; Schembri 51'; Cocalić 105' (pen.)	Stadium: Municipal Stadium of Mytilene; Referee: I.Papadopoulos

11 January 2012 Fifth	Panionios	0–0 (4–3 p)	Panathinaikos	Nea Smyrni
21:00		summary		Stadium: Nea Smyrni Stadium; Referee: Anastasios Kakos
	Penalties
	Samaris (penalty missed); Cocalić (penalty scored); Schembri (penalty missed); Goundoulakis (penalty scored); Siovas (penalty scored); Omo (penalty scored)		Karagounis (penalty missed); Quincy (penalty scored); Rudolf (penalty scored); Katsouranis (penalty scored); Leto (penalty missed); Bjärsmyr (penalty missed)

25 January 2012 Quarter-finals	Olympiacos	4–0	Panionios	Piraeus
19:00	Pantelić 12', 65'; Diogo 78'; Abdoun 87'	summary		Stadium: Karaiskakis Stadium; Referee: M.Aretopoulos

== Top goalscorers ==
10 goals

- (Finland) Njazi Kuqi (10 in Greek League)

5 goals

- (Malta) André Schembri (4 in Greek League, 1 in Greek Cup)

2 goals

- (Greece) Fanouris Goundoulakis (2 in Greek League)
- (Democratic Republic of the Congo) Patrick Dimbala (2 in Greek League)

1 goal

- (Spain) Sito Riera (1 in Greek League)
- (Ghana) Bennard Kumordzi (1 Greek League)
- (Uruguay) Fabián Estoyanoff (1 in Greek League)
- (Greece) Dimitris Kolovos (1 in Greek League)
- (Haiti) Jean-Jacques Pierre (1 Greek League)
- (Portugal) Vitorino Antunes (1 in Greek League)
- (Saudi Arabia) Amiri Kurdi (1 in Greek League)
- (Nigeria) Suleiman Omo (1 in Greek League)
- (Greece) Dimitris Siovas (1 in Greek Cup)
- (Bosnia and Herzegovina) Edin Cocalić (1 in Greek Cup)
