= 2014–15 Panionios F.C. season =

Panionios
2014–15 season
- Manager: Dimitris Terezopoulos
- Stadium: Nea Smyrni Stadium, Athens
- Super League Greece: 12th
- Greek Cup: Quarter-finals
- Top goalscorer: League: Apostolos Giannou (10); All: Apostolos Giannou (12)
Home colours	Away colours

The 2014–15 season was Panionios' 124th season in existence and its 54th in Super League Greece, the top tier of Greek football. They also competed in the Greek Cup, reaching the quarter-finals.

== Squad ==
Note: Flags indicate national team as defined under FIFA eligibility rules; some limited exceptions apply. Players may hold more than one non-FIFA nationality.

No.	Pos.	Nation	Player
1	GK	GRE	Nikos Papadopoulos
3	DF	GRE	Christos Tasoulis
4	DF	GRE	Dimitris Chatziisaias
5	DF	GRE	Nikos Pantidos
6	DF	GRE	Evangelos Oikonomou
7	FW	ARG	Ariel Ibagaza
8	MF	GRE	Vasilis Bouzas
9	FW	GRE	Taxiarchis Fountas
10	MF	CMR	Olivier Boumale
11	FW	GRE	Dimitris Kolovos
12	GK	GRE	Manolis Kalogerakis
14	FW	GRE	Anastasios Bakasetas
15	GK	GRE	Lefteris Astras
16	MF	GRE	Nikos Katharios
18	DF	GRE	Stefanos Evangelou
19	FW	GRE	Georgios Masouras
20	DF	GRE	Leonidas Argyropoulos
21	MF	GRE	Manolis Siopis
22	DF	ALB	Kosmas Gezos

No.	Pos.	Nation	Player
23	MF	GRE	Charis Kostakis
24	DF	GRE	Manos Zacharakis
25	DF	GRE	Xenofon Panos
29	DF	ALB	Jorgo Meksi
30	MF	GRE	Panagiotis Korbos
31	GK	GRE	Nikos Giannakopoulos
32	MF	ALB	Polydoros Gezos
33	MF	ALB	Damian Gjini
34	DF	GRE	Giorgos Kotsalas
49	DF	GRE	Spyros Risvanis
55	DF	GRE	Christos Cholevas
65	MF	GRE	Dimitris Voutsiotis
77	FW	GRE	Kostas Stavrothanasopoulos
82	MF	GRE	Pavlos Mitropoulos
88	DF	GRE	Thomas Gialamidis
93	DF	GRE	Dimitris Komnos
95	MF	GRE	Giannis Charontakis
96	FW	ALB	Fiorin Durmishaj
99	FW	AUS	Apostolos Giannou

== Competitions ==
=== Super League Greece ===
==== League table ====
Pos	Team	Pld	W	D	L	GF	GA	GD	Pts
11	PAS Giannina	34	12	5	17	34	43	−9	41 (Note: Head-to-head points: Panthrakikos 4, PAS Giannina 1.)
12	AEL Kalloni	34	12	3	19	31	62	−31	39 (Note: Head-to-head points: AEL Kalloni 4, Panionios 1.)
13	Panionios	34	10	9	15	33	42	−9	39
14	Platanias	34	10	8	16	39	48	−9	38 (Note: Head-to-head points: Platanias 8, Veria 5, Skoda Xanthi 3.)
15	Veria	34	9	11	14	31	51	−20	38

Source: Super League Greece
Rules for classification: 1) Points; 2) Head-to-head points; 3) Head-to-head goal difference; 4) Goals scored; 5) Goals against; 6) Play-offs (neutral ground).
(Note: Criteria 6 is only used if needed to decide champion, teams for relegation or teams for UEFA competitions).
If in final league table there are still tied teams after applying criteria 1 to 5, a decision match (or matches if they are more than two) are to be played but only in three cases: to determine the champion, to fill spots in the play-off or to determine the teams to be relegated. In any other case, the final standings of tied teams are determined with a public draw.

=== Greek Cup ===
==== Group stage ====
Team	Pld	W	D	L	GF	GA	GD	Pts
Olympiacos	3	2	1	0	4	1	+3	7
Panionios	3	1	2	0	5	1	+4	5
Panachaiki	3	1	0	2	2	5	−3	3
Fostiras	3	0	1	2	0	4	−4	1

24 September 2014 1	Panionios	0–0	Fostiras	Nea Smyrni Stadium
19:00

29 October 2014 2	Olympiacos	1–1	Panionios	Karaiskakis Stadium
19:30	Fortounis 13'		Mitropoulos 24'

7 January 2015 3	Panionios	4–0	Panachaiki	Nea Smyrni Stadium
19:30	Giannou 19', 66'; Kolovos 53' (pen.), 55'

==== Knockout phase ====
20 January 2015 Third round first leg	Panionios	2–1	Veria	Nea Smyrni Stadium
19:30	Ikonomou 62'; Kolovos 71'		Cámpora 2'

28 January 2015 Third round second leg	Veria	1–1 (2–3 agg.)	Panionios	Veria Stadium
15:00	Kaltsas 85'		Masouras 80'

11 February 2015 Quarter-finals first leg	Iraklis	2–0	Panionios	Kaftanzoglio Stadium
16:00	Korbos 15' (o.g.); Romano 74'

4 March 2015 Quarter-finals second leg	Panionios	2–0 (a.e.t.) (2–2 agg.) (3–4 p)	Iraklis	Nea Smyrni Stadium
19:00	Kolovos 19' (pen.); Boumale 45+2'
	Penalties
	Ikonomou (penalty missed); Gezos (penalty scored); Fountas (penalty scored); Giannou (penalty scored); Kolovos (penalty missed); Korbos (penalty missed)		(penalty missed) Romano; (penalty scored) Kyriakidis; (penalty scored) Huanderson; (penalty missed) Ziabaris; (penalty scored) Pourtoulidis; (penalty scored) Tsilianidis
