= 2015–16 Olympiacos F.C. season =

Olympiacos
2015–16 season
- Chairman: Evangelos Marinakis
- Manager: Marco Silva
- Stadium: Karaiskakis Stadium, Piraeus
- Super League Greece: 1st
- Greek Cup: Runners-up
- Champions League: Group stage
- Europa League: Round of 32
- Top goalscorer: League: Kostas Fortounis (18); All: Kostas Fortounis (11)
- Highest home attendance: 31,688 vs Bayern Munich (16 September 2015)
- Lowest home attendance: 15,102 vs Panetolikos (13 December 2015)
- Average home league attendance: 20,946
Home colours	Away colours	Third colours

The 2015–16 season was Olympiacos's 57th consecutive season in the Super League Greece and their 90th year in existence. The club was managed to become the champions for 6th consecutive year and for 18th time during the last 20 seasons. Olympiacos also participated in the Greek Football Cup, losing at the final against AEK Athens. They also took part in the UEFA Champions League (group stage) and the UEFA Europa League (knockout phase, round of 32).

== Players ==
No.	Name	Nationality	Position (s)	Date of birth (Age)	Signed from	Games played	Goals scored
Goalkeepers
16	Roberto	Spain	GK	10 February 1986 (29)	(Spain) Atlético Madrid	72	0
33	Eleftherios Choutesiotis	(Greece)	GK	20 July 1994 (21)	(Greece) Olympiacos FC Academy	0	0
37	Stefanos Kapino	(Greece)	GK	18 March 1994 (21)	(Germany) Mainz 05	0	0
Defenders
3	Alberto Botía	Spain	CB	27 January 1989 (26)	Sevilla FC	17	1
6	Manuel da Costa	(Morocco)	CB	6 May 1986 (29)	(Turkey) Sivasspor	2	0
14	Omar Elabdellaoui	(Norway)	RB	5 December 1991 (24)	(Germany) Eintracht Braunschweig	28	1
23	Dimitris Siovas	(Greece)	CB	16 September 1988 (27)	(Greece) Panionios	48	4
24	Tasos Avlonitis	(Greece)	CB	1 January 1990 (25)	(Greece) Panionios	18	2
26	Arthur Masuaku	(France)	LB	7 November 1993 (22)	(France) Valenciennes	29	0
29	Praxitelis Vouros	(Greece)	CB	5 May 1995 (20)	(Greece) Olympiacos Academy	0	0
30	Leandro Salino	(Brazil)	RB / DM	22 April 1985 (30)	(Portugal) Braga	30	0
31	Konstantinos Tsimikas	(Greece)	LB	12 May 1996 (19)	(Greece) Olympiacos Academy	0	0
Midfielders
2	Giannis Maniatis	(Greece)	DM / CM	12 October 1986 (29)	(Greece) Panionios	85	6
5	Luka Milivojević	(Serbia)	DM / CM	7 April 1991 (24)	(Belgium) Anderlecht	24	4
7	Kostas Fortounis	(Greece)	AM	16 October 1992 (23)	(Germany) Kaiserslautern	27	9
8	Andreas Bouchalakis	(Greece)	CM	5 April 1993 (22)	(Greece) Ergotelis	11	3
10	Alejandro Domínguez	(Argentina)	AM	10 June 1981 (34)	(Spain) Rayo Vallecano	54	20
11	Pajtim Kasami	(Switzerland)	CM	2 June 1992 (23)	(England) Fulham	24	2
15	Qazim Laçi	(Albania)	CM	19 January 1996 (19)	(Greece) Olympiacos Academy	0	0
19	David Fuster	(Spain)	AM	3 February 1982 (33)	(Spain) Villarreal	101	26
20	Dimitris Kolovos	(Greece)	AM / LW	27 April 1993 (22)	(Greece) Panionios	0	0
21	Jimmy Durmaz	(Sweden)	LW	22 March 1989 (26)	(Turkey) Gençlerbirliği	27	5
32	Theofanis Tzandaris	(Greece)	CM	13 June 1993 (22)	(Greece) PAOK	0	0
34	Manolis Saliakas	(Greece)	CM	12 September 1996 (19)	(Greece) Olympiacos Academy	0	0
44	Saša Zdjelar	(Serbia)	DM	20 March 1995 (20)	(Serbia) OFK Beograd	0	0
77	Hernâni	(Portugal)	CF	20 August 1991 (24)	(Portugal) Porto	0	0
90	Felipe Pardo	(Colombia)	RW	17 August 1990 (25)	(Portugal) Braga	2	0
91	Esteban Cambiasso	(Argentina)	DM	18 August 1980 (35)	(England) Leicester City	1	0
92	Sebá	(Brazil)	RW / CF	8 June 1992 (23)	(Portugal) Estoril	2	0
Forwards
9	Alfreð Finnbogason	(Iceland)	CF	1 February 1989 (27)	(Spain) Real Sociedad	1	0
17	Alan Pulido	(Mexico)	CF	8 March 1991 (24)	(Greece) Levadiakos	0	0
99	Brown Ideye	(Nigeria)	CF	10 October 1988 (27)	(England) West Bromwich Albion	0	0

For recent transfers, see List of Greek football transfers summer 2015

=== Olympiacos U20 squad ===
Olympiacos U20 is the youth team of Olympiacos. They participate in the Super League U20 championship and in UEFA Youth League competition. They play their home games at the 3,000-seater Renti Training Centre in Renti, Piraeus.

Note: Flags indicate national team as defined under FIFA eligibility rules; some limited exceptions apply. Players may hold more than one non-FIFA nationality.

No.	Pos.	Nation	Player
—	GK	GRE	Aris Vlachos
—	GK	GRE	Michalis Iliadis
—	GK	GRE	Giorgos Strezos
—	DF	GRE	Anastasis Bougioukos
—	DF	GRE	Dimitris Gkoutsios
—	DF	GRE	Giorgos Makrostergios
—	DF	GRE	Giannis Sotirakos
—	DF	GRE	Argyris Toufas
—	DF	GRE	Antonis Vatousiadis
—	DF	GRE	Praxitelis Vouros
—	DF	GRE	Panagiotis Volonakis
—	MF	GRE	Giorgos Lyras
—	MF	GRE	Ioannis Paidakis

No.	Pos.	Nation	Player
—	MF	GRE	Dimitrios Voutsiotis
—	MF	GRE	Giorgos Kanavetas
—	MF	GRE	Giannis Laci
—	MF	BIH	Boban Lazić
—	MF	GRE	Alexandros Margaritis
—	MF	GRE	Achilleas Nasiakopoulos
—	MF	GRE	Antonis Papasavvas
—	MF	GRE	Christoforos Pasalidis
—	MF	GRE	Charalambos Rentzis
—	MF	GRE	Manolis Saliakas
—	FW	GRE	Kostas Garefalakis
—	FW	GRE	Ilias Ignatidis

== Transfers and loans ==
=== Transfers in ===
Note: Flags indicate national team as defined under FIFA eligibility rules; some limited exceptions apply. Players may hold more than one non-FIFA nationality.

No.	Pos.	Nation	Player
—	FW	GRE	(from (Greece) OFI) (fee:free transfer)
—	MF	GRE	Bruno Chalkiadakis (from (Greece) Ergotelis) (fee:free transfer)
—	FW	MEX	Alan Pulido (from (Greece) Levadiakos) (fee:free transfer)
—	GK	GRE	Stefanos Kapino (from (Germany) Mainz 05) (fee: €2M)
—	MF	GRE	Theofanis Tzandaris (from (Greece) PAOK) (fee:free transfer)
—	DF	GRE	Manolis Bertos (from (Greece) Skoda Xanthi) (fee:free transfer)
—	FW	NGR	Brown Ideye (from (England) West Bromwich Albion) (fee: €5M)
—	FW	POR	Hernâni (from (Portugal) Porto) (loan until 30 June 2016) (fee: €1.5M)
—	FW	ISL	Alfreð Finnbogason (from (Spain) Real Sociedad) (loan until 30 June 2016) (fee: €1M)
—	MF	COL	Felipe Pardo (from (Portugal) Braga) (fee: €4.5M)
—	DF	POR	Manuel da Costa (from (Turkey) Sivasspor) (fee: €2M)
—	DF	GRE	Dimitrios Goutas (from (Greece) Skoda Xanthi) (fee: €0.8M)
—	MF	ARG	Esteban Cambiasso (from (England) Leicester City) (fee: free transfer)
—	FW	GRE	Giannis Gianniotas (from (Germany) Fortuna Düsseldorf) (fee: €0.5M)
—	FW	BRA	Sebá (from (Portugal) Estoril) (fee: €1.8M)
—	FW	GRE	Dimitris Kolovos (from (Greece) Panionios)(loan return)
—	MF	SRB	Saša Zdjelar (from (Serbia) OFK Beograd)(loan return)
—	MF	ALB	Qazim Laci (promoted from youth system)
—	DF	GRE	Praxitelis Vouros (promoted from youth system)
—	MF	GRE	Kostas Tsimikas (promoted from youth system)
—	FW	COM	El Fardou Ben Nabouhane (from (Greece) Veria F.C.)(fee:free transfer)
—	FW	GRE	Nikolaos Ioannidis (from (Germany) Borussia Dortmund II)(loan return)

Total spending: €19,800,000

=== Transfers out ===
Note: Flags indicate national team as defined under FIFA eligibility rules; some limited exceptions apply. Players may hold more than one non-FIFA nationality.

No.	Pos.	Nation	Player
—	FW	GRE	Kostas Mitroglou (loan return to (England) Fulham)
—	FW	NED	Ibrahim Affelay (loan return to (Spain) Barcelona)
—	DF	GRE	Manolis Tzanakakis (loan to (Cyprus) Anorthosis Famagusta) (until 30 June 2016)
—	MF	ARG	Nicolás Martínez (loan to (Cyprus) Anorthosis Famagusta) (until 30 June 2016)
—	FW	GRE	Dimitrios Diamantakos (loan to (Germany) Karlsruhe) (until 30 June 2016)
—	FW	GRE	Nikos Vergos (loan to (Spain) Elche) (until 30 June 2016)
—	FW	GRE	Nikolaos Ioannidis (loan to (Germany) Borussia Dortmund II) (until 31 December 2015)
—	FW	NGR	Michael Olaitan (loan to (Netherlands) Twente) (until 30 June 2016)
—	FW	SRB	Marko Šćepović (loan to (Belgium) Royal Mouscron-Péruwelz) (until 30 June 2016)
—	FW	PAR	Jorge Benítez (loan to (Mexico) Cruz Azul) (until 30 June 2016)
—	FW	GRE	Anastasios Karamanos (loan to (Greece) Panionios) (until 30 June 2016)
—	DF	GRE	Kostas Giannoulis (transfer to (Greece) Asteras Tripolis (free transfer))
—	GK	GRE	Andreas Gianniotis (loan to (Greece) Panionios)(Until 30 June 2016)
—	DF	GRE	Manolis Bertos (loan to (Greece) Skoda Xanthi)(Until 30 June 2016)
—	DF	GRE	Epaminondas Pantelakis (loan to (Greece) PGS Kissamikos) (Until 30 June 2016)
—	MF	MLI	Sambou Yatabaré (loan to (Belgium) Standard Liège) (until 30 June 2016)
—	MF	TOG	Mathieu Dossevi (loan to (Belgium) Standard Liège) (Until 30 June 2016)
—	MF	GRE	Zisis Karachalios (loan to (Greece) Anagennisi Karditsa)
—	MF	MNE	Marko Janković (loan to (Slovenia) Maribor) (until 30 June 2016)
—	DF	GRE	Dimitrios Goutas (loan to (Greece) Skoda Xanthi) (until 30 June 2016)
—	FW	COM	El Fardou Ben Nabouhane (loan to (Greece) Levadiakos) (until 30 June 2016)
—	FW	GRE	Giannis Gianniotas (loan to (Cyprus) APOEL) (until 30 June 2016)
—	GK	GEO	Giorgi Loria (transfer to (Russia) Krylia Sovetov (free transfer))
—	FW	ARG	Franco Jara (transfer to (Mexico) Pachuca (free transfer))
—	MF	GRE	Panagiotis Vlachodimos (Free Agent)

== Friendlies ==
Win Draw Loss Upcoming fixture

=== July friendlies ===
15 July 2015 Friendly	Olympiacos	0–1	Dukla Prague	Austria
19:15		Report	Jurendić 87'

18 July 2015 Friendly	Olympiacos	1–0	Rizespor	Austria
19:00	Fuster 83'	Report

=== Afyon Cup ===
21 July 2015 Friendly	Fenerbahçe	3–2	Olympiacos	Turkey
20:30	Sow 11'; Fernandão 32'; Zeybek 65'	Report	Fortounis 26' (pen.); Domínguez 89'

23 July 2015 Friendly	Antalyaspor	0–0	Olympiacos	Turkey
20:30		Report

=== August friendlies ===
29 July 2015 Friendly	Twente	1–2	Olympiacos	Veenoord, Netherlands
20:00	Ziyech 77'	Report	Fortounis 29'; Pardo 45'	Stadium: Sportpark S.V. Twedo; Referee: Ed Janssen (Netherlands)

1 August 2015 Friendly	Feyenoord	1–3	Olympiacos	Rotterdam, Netherlands
21:00	Kuyt 62' (pen.)	Report	Jara 6'; Pardo 23'; Fortounis 45+1'	Attendance: De Kuip; Referee: Pol van Boekel (Netherlands)

4 August 2015 Friendly	Olympiacos	1–0	Sivasspor	Netherlands
20:00	Pardo 67'	Report

9 August 2015 Friendly	Olympiacos	2–1	Beşiktaş	Piraeus, Greece
21:00	Finnbogason 59'; Fuster 90+1' (pen.)	Report	Uysal 88'	Stadium: Karaiskakis Stadium; Attendance: 13,000; Referee: Stavros Tritsonis (Greece)

13 August 2015 Friendly	Olympiacos	1–1	Qatar	Zürich, Switzerland
18:30	Siovas 88'		Al Haidos 81'	Referee: Amhof Sascha (Switzerland)

=== May friendlies ===
8 May 2015 Friendly	Red Star Belgrade	2–2	Olympiacos	Belgrade, Serbia
19:00 (local time)				Stadium: Red Star Stadium

== Competitions ==
Win Draw Loss Upcoming fixture

=== Super League Greece ===
==== League table ====
Pos	Team	Pld	W	D	L	GF	GA	GD	Pts	Qualification or relegation
1	Olympiacos (C)	30	28	1	1	81	16	+65	85	Qualification for the Champions League third qualifying round
2	Panathinaikos (Note: Panathinaikos were deducted 3 points due to extreme fan behavior against Olympiacos. The match was awarded as a 3–0 win for Olympiacos.)	30	18	4	8	52	26	+26	55	Qualification for the Play-offs
3	AEK Athens (Note: AEK were deducted 3 points due to extreme fan behavior against Atromitos.)	30	17	6	7	43	21	+22	54	Qualification for the Play-offs
4	PAOK (Note: PAOK were deducted 3 points due to extreme fan behavior against Olympiacos in Greek Cup semifinal match.)	30	13	9	8	45	32	+13	45	Qualification for the Play-offs
5	Panionios	30	12	8	10	33	27	+6	44	Qualification for the Play-offs

Source: Super League Greece
Rules for classification: 1) Points; 2) Head-to-head points; 3) Head-to-head goal difference; 4) Goals scored; 5) Goals against; 6) Play-offs (neutral ground); 7) Draw.
(Note: Criteria 6 is only used if needed to decide champion, teams for relegation or teams for UEFA competitions).
(C) Champions

==== Results summary ====
Overall								Home						Away					
Pld	W	D	L	GF	GA	GD	Pts	W	D	L	GF	GA	GD	W	D	L	GF	GA	GD
30	28	1	1	81	16	+65	85	15	0	0	45	5	+40	13	1	1	36	11	+25

Last updated: 17 April 2016.
Source: Competitive matches

==== Results by round ====
Round	1	2	3	4	5	6	7	8	9	10	11	12	13	14	15	16	17	18	19	20	21	22	23	24	25	26	27	28	29	30
Ground	H	A	H	A	H	A	H	A	A	H	A	H	A	H	A	A	H	A	H	A	H	A	H	H	A	H	A	H	A	H
Result	W	W	W	W	W	W	W	W	W	W	P	W	W	W	W	W	W	D	W	W	W	L	W	W	W	W	W	W	W	W
Position	2	2	1	1	1	1	1	1	1	1	1	1	1	1	1	1	1	1	1	1	1	1	1	1	1	1	1	1	1	1

A = Away; H = Home; W = Win; D = Draw; L = Loss; P = Postponed

==== Matches ====
Win Draw Loss Postponed

23 August 2015 1	Olympiacos	3–0	Panionios	Piraeus
21:30	Fortounis 25'; Bouchalakis 72'; Dossevi 90+1'	Report		Stadium: Karaiskakis Stadium; Attendance: 21,807; Referee: Ioannis Delfakis

29 August 2015 2	Levadiakos	0–2	Olympiacos	Athens^{1}
19:15		Report	Milivojević 89'; Fortounis 90+1'	Stadium: Olympic Stadium^{1} Attendance: 4,931; Referee: Marios Lambropoulos

12 September 2015 3	Olympiacos	3–1	Platanias	Piraeus
20:30	Durmaz 11'; Domínguez 52'; Masuaku 59'	Report	Yaya 71'	Stadium: Karaiskakis Stadium; Attendance: 16,269; Referee: Charalambos Kalogeropoulos

22 September 2015 ^{2} 4	Skoda Xanthi	1–3	Olympiacos	Xanthi
20:30	Dimitrov 50'	Report	Durmaz 42'; Fortounis 65' (pen.), 68'	Stadium: Skoda Xanthi Arena; Attendance: 1,989; Referee: Xristos Mitsios

26 September 2015 5	Olympiacos	5–1	PAS Giannina	Piraeus
20:30	Kasami 31'; Fortounis 32'; Botía 42'; Tzimopoulos 52' (o.g.); Durmaz 72' (pen.)	Report	Lila 86'	Stadium: Karaiskakis Stadium; Attendance: 17,248; Referee: Giannis Papadopoulos

4 October 2015 6	PAOK	0–2	Olympiacos	Thessaloniki
20:30		Report	Ideye 27'; Milivojević 36'	Stadium: Toumba Stadium; Attendance: 25,674; Referee: Athanasios Giaxos

17 October 2015 7	Olympiacos	4–0	AEK Athens	Piraeus
20:30	Botía 28'; Ideye 70'; Fortounis 78', 90+4' (pen.)	Report		Stadium: Karaiskakis Stadium; Attendance: 30,056; Referee: Giorgos Kizas

25 October 2015 8	Atromitos	1–2	Olympiacos	Athens
15:00	Stojčev 75'	Report	Botía 59', 63'	Stadium: Peristeri Stadium; Attendance: 2,284; Referee: Alexandros Dimitropoulos

31 October 2015 9	Veria	0–2	Olympiacos	Veria
19:30		Report	Ideye 55'; Durmaz 74'	Stadium: Veria Stadium; Attendance: 2,451; Referee: Xristos Mitsios

8 November 2015 10	Olympiacos	2–0	Iraklis	Piraeus
15:00	Milivojević 20'; Ideye 61'	Report		Stadium: Karaiskakis Stadium; Attendance: 19,505; Referee: Marios Labropoulos

21 November 2015 11	Panathinaikos	0–3 (Awarded) ^{3}	Olympiacos	Athens
19:30		Report		Stadium: Leoforos Alexandras Stadium; Attendance: 13,145; Referee: Andreas Pappas

29 November 2015 12	Olympiacos	3–1	Asteras Tripolis	Piraeus
19:30	Fortounis 73' (pen.), 80'; Ideye 86'	Report	Giannou 90+3'	Stadium: Karaiskakis Stadium; Attendance: 0 (closed doors); Referee: Georgios Kizas

5 December 2015 13	Panthrakikos	3–4	Olympiacos	Komotini
19:30	Diguiny 15', 90+1'; Iliadis 87'	Report	Durmaz 14'; Fortounis 48' (pen.); Finnbogason 66' (pen.); Sebá 80'	Stadium: Komotini Municipal Stadium; Attendance: 2,372; Referee: Charalambos Kalogeropoulos

13 December 2015 14	Olympiacos	1–0	Panetolikos	Piraeus
15:00	Domínguez 45+5'	Report		Stadium: Karaiskakis Stadium; Attendance: 15,102; Referee: Ioannis Papadopoulous

20 December 2015 15	Kalloni	0–2	Olympiacos	Mytilene
19:30		Report	Fortounis 9', 38' (pen.)	Stadium: Mytilene Municipal Stadium; Attendance: 2,159; Referee: Stavros Mantalos

3 January 2016 16	Panionios	1–3	Olympiacos	Nea Smyrni
19:30	Risvanis 63'	Report	Domínguez 56'; Pardo 73'; Ideye 80'	Stadium: Nea Smyrni Stadium; Attendance: 1,793; Referee: Alexandros Dimitropoulos

10 January 2016 17	Olympiacos	3–1	Levadiakos	Piraeus
19:30	Ideye 16'; Pardo 42'; Domínguez 56'	Report	Nabouhane 88'	Stadium: Karaiskakis Stadium; Attendance: 18,182; Referee: Michail Voskakis

18 January 2016 18	Platanias	1–1	Olympiacos	Chania
19:30	Ramos 35'	Report	Fortounis 72'	Stadium: Perivolia Municipal Stadium; Attendance: 2,459; Referee: Ilias Spathas

23 January 2016 19	Olympiacos	1–0	Skoda Xanthi	Piraeus
19:30	Pulido 74'	Report		Stadium: Karaiskakis Stadium; Attendance: 13,227; Referee: Charalambos Kalogeropoulos

31 January 2016 20	PAS Giannina	0–3	Olympiacos	Ioannina
19:30		Report	Fortounis 13'; Fortounis 25'; Durmaz 57'	Stadium: Zosimades Stadium; Attendance: 4,484; Referee: Marios Labropoulos

7 February 2016 21	Olympiacos	1–0	PAOK	Piraeus
19:30	Elabdellaoui 8'	Report		Stadium: Karaiskakis Stadium; Attendance: 29,576; Referee: Alexandros Dimitropoulos

13 February 2016 22	AEK Athens	1–0	Olympiacos	Athens
19:30	Vargas 79'	Report		Stadium: Olympic Stadium; Attendance: 31,121; Referee: Charalambos Kalogeropoulos

21 February 2016 23	Olympiacos	4–0	Atromitos	Piraeus
15:00	Domínguez 10'; Pulido 65'; Cambiasso 74'; Fortounis 85'	Report		Stadium: Karaiskakis Stadium; Attendance: 16,040; Referee: Georgios Kyzas

28 February 2016 24	Olympiacos	3–0	Veria	Piraeus
15:00	Fuster 19', 65'; Pulido 83'	Report		Stadium: Karaiskakis Stadium; Attendance: 14,934; Referee: Aristidis Vatsios

6 March 2016 25	Iraklis	0–2	Olympiacos	Thessaloniki
19:30		Report	Durmaz 12'; Ideye 44'	Stadium: Kaftanzoglio Stadium; Attendance: 4,274; Referee: Alexandros Aretopoulos

13 March 2016 26	Olympiacos	3–1	Panathinaikos	Piraeus
19:30	Cambiasso 38'; Da Costa 87'; Ideye 89'	Report	Berg 3'	Stadium: Karaiskakis Stadium; Attendance: 30,314; Referee: Georgios Kyzas

20 March 2016 27	Asteras Tripolis	1–2	Olympiacos	Tripoli
19:30	Dimoutsos 90'	Report	Hernâni 1', 49'	Stadium: Theodoros Kolokotronis Stadium; Attendance: 2,447; Referee: Michael Koukoulakis

3 April 2016 28	Olympiacos	4–0	Panthrakikos	Piraeus
19:00	Pulido 26'; Pardo 40'; Hernâni 43', 90'	Report		Stadium: Karaiskakis Stadium; Attendance: 0 (closed doors); Referee: Georgios Foukakis

10 April 2016 29	Panetolikos	2–5	Olympiacos	Agrinio
19:00	Warda 88'; Kappel 90'	Report	Fortounis 7'; Da Costa 30'; Sebá 57'; Pulido 69'; Pardo 86'	Stadium: Panetolikos Stadium; Attendance: 3,766; Referee: Anastasios Sidiropoulos

17 April 2016 30	Olympiacos	5–0	Kalloni	Piraeus
19:00	Fortounis 21'; Fuster 35'; Kasami 61'; Elabdellaoui 77'; Ideye 84'	Report		Stadium: Karaiskakis Stadium; Attendance: 30,043; Referee: Ananias Fotiadis

1. Matchday 2 vs. Levadiakos, originally meant to be held in Levadia at Levadia Municipal Stadium, but due to the bad condition of the stadium Super League Greece decided to be held in Athens at the Olympic Stadium 2. Matches of Matchday 4 originally was scheduled to be held in 19/20/21 September 2015, but due to the Elections to be held on 20 September 2015 Super League Greece, decided the Matchday 4 to be held 22/23 September 2015. 3. Due to extreme fan behavior against Olympiacos, the match was awarded as a 3–0 win for Olympiacos.

=== Greek Football Cup ===
==== Second round ====
Group E

Pos	Team	Pld	W	D	L	GF	GA	GD	Pts	Qualification	OLY	PLA	APS	PEG
1	Olympiacos	3	2	1	0	8	3	+5	7	Round of 16		2–2	—	—
2	Platanias	3	1	1	1	5	4	+1	4	Round of 16	—		3–1	—
3	Apollon Smyrnis	3	1	0	2	5	6	−1	3		1–2	—		3–1
4	Panegialios	3	1	0	2	2	7	−5	3		0–4	1–0	—	

Source: epo.gr

28 October 2015 Matchday 1	Olympiacos	2–2	Platanias	Piraeus
	Hernâni 47', 90+1'	Report	Ramos 78'; Banana 78'	Stadium: Karaiskakis Stadium; Referee: Georgios Kominis (Thesprotia)

2 December 2015 Matchday 2	Panegialios	0–4	Olympiacos	Aigio
19:30		Report	Cambiasso 23'; Domínguez 41'; Kolovos 86'; Fuster 89'	Stadium: Aigio National Stadium; Referee: Alexandros Katsikogiannis (Epirus)

16 December 2015 Matchday 3	Apollon Smyrnis	1–2	Olympiacos	Athens
19:30	Valerianos 53'	Report	Fuster 45', 85'	Stadium: Georgios Kamaras Stadium; Referee: Andreas Pappas (Athens)

==== Third round ====
7 January 2016	Chania	1–4	Olympiacos	Chania
17:15	Gesios 8'	Report	Hernâni 22'; Kolovos 39'; Sebá 86'; Maniatis 90'	Stadium: Perivolia Municipal Stadium; Referee: Anastasios Sidiropoulos (Dodecanese)

13 January 2016	Olympiacos	6–0 (10–1 agg.)	Chania	Piraeus
19:30	Zdjelar 4'; Kasami 11', 45'; Sebá 36'; Pulido 73'; Fuster 90'	Report		Stadium: Karaiskakis Stadium; Referee: Alexandros Katsikogiannis (Epirus)

==== Quarter-finals ====
27 January 2016	Olympiacos	5–0	Asteras Tripolis	Piraeus
19:30	Ideye 13', 41'; Fortounis 50', 64'; Pardo 79'	Report		Stadium: Karaiskakis Stadium; Referee: Christos Mitsios (Epirus)

3 February 2016	Asteras Tripolis	1–1 (1–6 agg.)	Olympiacos	Tripoli
19:30	Iglesias 20'	Report	da Costa 53'	Stadium: Theodoros Kolokotronis Stadium; Referee: Angelos Evangelou (Athens)

==== Semi-finals ====
2 March 2016	PAOK	0–3 (Awarded)	Olympiacos	Thessaloniki
19:30	Mak 9'	Report	Cambiasso 27'; Fuster 56'	Stadium: Toumba Stadium; Referee: Andreas Pappas (Athens)
Note: Match abandoned in the 90th minute with the score at 1–2. It was later awarded as a 0–3 win for Olympiacos.

27 April 2016	Olympiacos	3–0 (Awarded) (6–0 agg.)	PAOK	Piraeus
17:00		Report		Stadium: Karaiskakis Stadium; Referee: Charalampos Kalogeropoulos (Athens)

==== Final ====
17 May 2016 Final	Olympiacos	1–2	AEK Athens	Athens
20:30	Domínguez 84'	Report	Mantalos 38'; Djebbour 51'	Stadium: Olympic Stadium; Attendance: 0 (closed doors); Referee: Anastasios Sidiropoulos (Dodecanese)

=== UEFA Champions League ===
==== Group stage ====
Pos	Team	Pld	W	D	L	GF	GA	GD	Pts	Qualification	BAY	ARS	OLY	DZG
1	(Germany) Bayern Munich	6	5	0	1	19	3	+16	15	Advance to knockout phase	—	5–1	4–0	5–0
2	(England) Arsenal	6	3	0	3	12	10	+2	9	Advance to knockout phase	2–0	—	2–3	3–0
3	(Greece) Olympiacos	6	3	0	3	6	13	−7	9	Transfer to Europa League	0–3	0–3	—	2–1
4	(Croatia) Dinamo Zagreb	6	1	0	5	3	14	−11	3		0–2	2–1	0–1	—

Source: UEFA
Rules for classification: Group stage tiebreakers

16 September 2015 Matchday 1	Olympiacos (Greece)	0–3	(Germany) Bayern Munich	Piraeus, Greece
21:45		Report	Müller 52', 90+2' (pen.); Götze 89'	Stadium: Karaiskakis Stadium; Attendance: 31,688; Referee: Carlos Velasco Carballo (Spain)

29 September 2015 Matchday 2	Arsenal (England)	2–3	(Greece) Olympiacos	Holloway, London, England
21:45	Walcott 35'; Sánchez 65'	Report	Pardo 33'; Ospina 40' (o.g.); Finnbogason 66'	Stadium: Emirates Stadium; Attendance: 59,428; Referee: Bas Nijhuis (Netherlands)

20 October 2015 Matchday 3	Dinamo Zagreb (Croatia)	0–1	(Greece) Olympiacos	Zagreb, Croatia
21:45		Report	Ideye 79'	Stadium: Maksimir Stadium; Attendance: 13,678; Referee: Paolo Tagliavento (Italy)

4 November 2015 Matchday 4	Olympiacos (Greece)	2–1	(Croatia) Dinamo Zagreb	Piraeus, Greece
21:45	Pardo 65', 90'	Report	Hodžić 57'	Stadium: Karaiskakis Stadium; Attendance: 31,473; Referee: Antonio Mateu Lahoz (Spain)

24 November 2015 Matchday 5	Bayern Munich (Germany)	4–0	(Greece) Olympiacos	Munich, Germany
21:45	Douglas Costa 8'; Lewandowski 16'; Müller 20'; Coman 69'	Report		Stadium: Allianz Arena; Attendance: 70,000; Referee: Jonas Eriksson (Sweden)

9 December 2015 Matchday 6	Olympiacos (Greece)	0–3	(England) Arsenal	Piraeus, Greece
21:45		Report	Giroud 27', 49', 67' (pen.)	Stadium: Karaiskakis Stadium; Attendance: 31,388; Referee: Nicola Rizzoli (Italy)

=== UEFA Europa League ===
Olympiacos qualified to UEFA Europa League knock-out stage as the 3rd team of Champions League Group F.

==== Round of 32 ====
18 February 2016 1st leg	Anderlecht (Belgium)	1–0	(Greece) Olympiacos	Brussels, Belgium
20:00	Mbodji 67'	Report		Stadium: Constant Vanden Stock Stadium; Attendance: 15,397; Referee: Ivan Bebek (Croatia)

25 February 2016 2nd leg	Olympiacos (Greece)	1–2 (a.e.t.) (1–3 agg.)	(Belgium) Anderlecht	Piraeus, Greece
22:05	Fortounis 29' (pen.)	Report	Acheampong 102', 111'	Stadium: Karaiskakis Stadium; Attendance: 31,005; Referee: Arnold Hunter (Northern Ireland)

== Statistics ==
=== Goal scorers ===
No.	Pos.	Nation	Name	Super League Greece	UEFA Champions League	Greek Cup	Total
7	MF	(Greece)	Kostas Fortounis	18	0	0	18
99	FW	(Nigeria)	Brown Ideye	5	1	0	6
21	MF	(Sweden)	Jimmy Durmaz	5	0	0	5
3	MF	(Spain)	Alberto Botía	4	0	0	4
90	MF	(Colombia)	Felipe Pardo	0	3	0	3
5	MF	(Serbia)	Luka Milivojević	3	0	0	3
77	FW	(Portugal)	Hernâni	0	0	3	3
8	MF	(Greece)	Andreas Bouchalakis	1	0	0	1
9	FW	(Iceland)	Alfreð Finnbogason	1	1	0	2
10	MF	(Argentina)	Alejandro Domínguez	1	0	1	2
11	MF	(Switzerland)	Pajtim Kasami	1	0	0	1
26	DF	(France)	Arthur Masuaku	1	0	0	1
-	MF	(Togo)	Mathieu Dossevi	1	0	0	1
-	-	-	Opponent's own Goals	1	1	0	2
TOTAL				35	6	6	47

Last updated: 5 November 2015

== Individual Awards ==
Name	Pos.	Award
(Greece) Kostas Fortounis	Attacking Midfielder	Super League Greece Player of the Season; Super League Greece Golden Boot; Super League Greece Greek Footballer of the Season; Super League Greece Team of the Season; Olympiacos Goal of the Season
(Spain) Roberto	Goalkeeper	Super League Greece Goalkeeper the Season; Super League Greece Team of the Season
(France) Arthur Masuaku	Left-back	Super League Greece Team of the Season
