= Alexandros Kouros =

Greek footballer

Personal information
- Full name: Alexandros Kouros
- Date of birth: 21 August 1993 (age 33)
- Place of birth: Poliçan, Albania
- Height: 1.84 m (6 ft 1/2 in)
- Position: Left back

Team information
- Current team: Vllaznia Shkodër
- Number: 55

Senior career*
Years	Team	Apps	(Gls)
2011–2014	Panionios	57	(0)
2014–2016	Atromitos	30	(0)
2016–2017	Iraklis	27	(1)
2017–2018	Apollon Smyrnis	18	(0)
2018–2019	Kerkyra	20	(0)
2019–2021	Teuta Durrës	65	(0)
2021–2022	PAEEK	32	(3)
2022–2023	Teuta Durrës	33	(0)
2023–2025	Floriana	54	(1)
2025–	Vllaznia Shkodër	14	(0)

International career
2011–2012	Greece U19	4	(0)
2012–2013	Greece U20	3	(0)
2012–2015	Greece U21	4	(0)
- * Club domestic league appearances and goals as of 24 June 2026

Alexandros Kouros (Greek: Αλέξανδρος Κούρος; Albanian: Aleksandër Kuro; born 21 August 1993) is a Greek professional footballer who plays as a left back for Albanian club Vllaznia Shkodër.

== Career statistics ==
As of 29 March 2024

Appearances and goals by club, season and competition
Club	Season	League			Cup		Continental		Other		Total	
Club	Season	Division	Apps	Goals	Apps	Goals	Apps	Goals	Apps	Goals	Apps	Goals
Panionios	2011–12	Super League Greece	3	0	0	0	—		—		3	0
Panionios	2012–13	Super League Greece	23	0	0	0	—		—		23	0
Panionios	2013–14	Super League Greece	31	0	3	0	—		—		34	0
Panionios	Total		57	0	3	0	—		—		60	0
Atromitos	2014–15	Super League Greece	20	0	1	1	—		—		21	1
Atromitos	2015–16	Super League Greece	10	0	3	2	1 (Note: Appearance(s) in UEFA Europa League)	0	—		13	2
Atromitos	Total		30	0	4	3	1	0	—		34	3
Iraklis	2016–17	Super League Greece	27	1	3	1	—		—		30	2
Apollon Smyrnis	2017–18	Super League Greece	18	0	1	0	—		—		19	0
Kerkyra	2018–19	Football League Greece	20	0	1	0	—		—		21	0
Teuta Durrës	2019–20	Kategoria Superiore	35	0	4	0	2	0	—		39	0
Teuta Durrës	2020–21	Kategoria Superiore	30	0	3	0	2	0	1 (Note: Appearance in Maltese Super Cup)	0	34	0
Teuta Durrës	Total		65	0	7	0	4	0	1	0	73	0
PAEEK	2021–22	Cypriot First Division	32	2	2	1	—		—		34	3
Teuta Durrës	2022–23	Kategoria Superiore	33	0	8	0	—		—		41	0
Floriana	2023–24	Maltese Premier League	20	1	2	0	—		—		22	1
Career total			302	4	31	5	5	0	1	0	334	9
