= Anastasios Avlonitis =

Greek professional footballer

Tasos Avlonitis
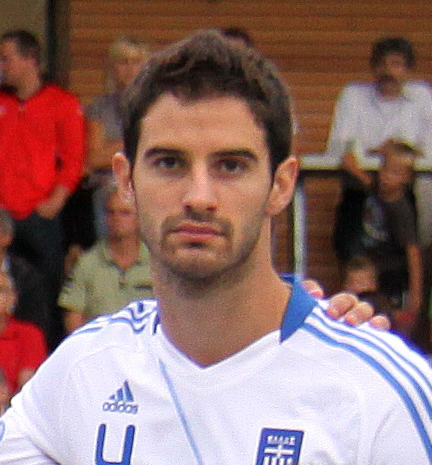
- Avlonitis playing for Greece U21

Personal information
- Full name: Anastasios Avlonitis
- Date of birth: 1 January 1990 (age 36)
- Place of birth: Chalcis, Greece
- Height: 1.91 m (6 ft 3 in)
- Position: Centre-back

Team information
- Current team: Panionios
- Number: 5

Youth career
- 2007: Chalkineo Evias

Senior career*
| Years | Team | Apps | (Gls) |
| 2007–2010 | Egaleo | 31 | (1) |
| 2008–2009 | → Ilisiakos (loan) | 21 | (2) |
| 2010–2011 | Kavala | 4 | (0) |
| 2011–2014 | Panionios | 59 | (0) |
| 2014–2015 | Olympiacos | 18 | (2) |
| 2015–2016 | Sturm Graz | 16 | (0) |
| 2017 | Heart of Midlothian | 9 | (0) |
| 2017–2018 | Panathinaikos | 6 | (0) |
| 2018–2020 | Sturm Graz | 47 | (1) |
| 2020–2022 | Ascoli | 30 | (0) |
| 2022 | Apollon Limassol | 3 | (0) |
| 2023–2024 | Panserraikos | 26 | (2) |
| 2024– | Panionios | 41 | (2) |

International career
| 2009 | Greece U19 | 4 | (0) |
| 2011–2012 | Greece U21 | 3 | (0) |
- * Club domestic league appearances and goals as of 19 September 2026

Anastasios "Tasos" Avlonitis (Greek: Αναστάσιος "Τάσος" Αυλωνίτης; born 1 January 1990) is a Greek professional footballer who plays as a centre-back for Super League 2 club Panionios.

== Club career ==
=== Early career ===
Avlonitis started as an amateur in his hometown team Chalkineo Evias in which he played in the local league. In 2007, he was signed to Egaleo, which for three seasons played in Football League. In the 2008–09 season he was loaned to Ilisiakos. In 2010, he signed to Kavala, where he played the 2010–11 season. After the involvement of the club president Psomiadis in a match-fixing scandal, Avlonitis was released and signed a contract with Panionios.

=== Olympiacos ===
In July 2014, Olympiacos announced the transfer of Avlonitis from former club Panionios for a fee of around €670,000. On his first derby game against Panathinaikos, on 26 October 2014, Avlonitis scored the winning goal for Olympiacos, as they beat Panathinaikos 1–0 at home. His next goal came against Panthrakikos in a 5–1 home win. On 30 January 2015, the Austrian club Sturm Graz have expressed an interest to sign Olympiacos defender on loan. The Greek defender is not in Marco Silva's plans and Sturm Graz are moving towards to clinch a loan deal until the end of the season. Eventually, the central defender will continue his career in Austria for Sturm Graz, on loan until the end of 2015–16 season. On 6 February 2016, he made his debut with the club in a 2–2 away draw against Altach.

On 1 September 2016, he mutually solved his contract with Olympiacos.

=== Heart of Midlothian ===
On 30 January 2017, Avlonitis signed for Scottish Premiership club, Heart of Midlothian on a six-month deal running until the end of the 2016–17 season. On 22 May 2017, Avlonitis was released by the club, following the end of the Premiership season.

=== Panathinaikos ===
On 11 September 2017, Avlonitis signed a two years contract with Super League club Panathinaikos for an undisclosed fee. In the first half of the 2016–17 season, the central defender was bright in for defensive cover and has found first team minutes hard to come by since arriving but when called upon he has demonstrated he can be trusted. Given his lack of playing time it is hard to judge but he is expected to feature more often in the second half of the season after the probable departure of Rodrigo Moledo.

=== Sturm Graz ===
In April 2018, Avlonitis signed a two-year contract with his former club Sturm Graz, in which he played on loan from Olympiacos in the second half of the 2015–16 season. He had previously terminated his contract with Panathinaikos at his own request. On 9 August 2018, he played his first international game as a starter in a 2–0 home loss for UEFA Europa League Third qualifying round, 1st leg game against AEK Larnaca. On 21 September 2019, he scored his first goal with the club with a kick after a Kiril Despodov's corner in an away 3–3 draw against SV Mattersburg. The Greek defender, who has been irreplaceable this season in Sturm Graz's backline, produced a cheeky back-heel assist to register his second assist of the season. As a result of his excellent form, was included in the Best XI for matchday 18 in the Austrian Football Bundesliga. On 28 December 2019, Sturm Graz revealed their Team of the Decade, with Avlonitis and Charalampos Lykogiannis both included in the starting 11.

=== Ascoli ===
On 21 September 2020, he joined Italian club Ascoli on a 2-year contract.

=== Apollon Limassol ===
On 27 January 2022, he signed a 1.5-year contract with Apollon Limassol in Cyprus.

=== Panserraikos ===
In January 2023, Avlonitis signed for Panserraikos to help the team return to the Super League.

== International career ==
He was also a former Greece under-19 and Greece under-21 international.

== Career statistics ==
As of 7 February 2022

Club statistics
| Club | Season | League | | | National Cup | | Europe | | Other | | Total | |
| Club | Season | Division | App | Goals | App | Goals | App | Goals | App | Goals | App | Goals |
|---|---|---|---|---|---|---|---|---|---|---|---|---|
| Egaleo | 2007–08 | Super League Greece 2 | 19 | 1 | 0 | 0 | 0 | 0 | 0 | 0 | 19 | 1 |
| Egaleo | 2008–09 | Super League Greece 2 | 0 | 0 | 0 | 0 | 0 | 0 | 0 | 0 | 0 | 0 |
| Egaleo | 2009–10 | Super League Greece 2 | 12 | 0 | 1 | 0 | 0 | 0 | 0 | 0 | 13 | 0 |
| Egaleo | Total | | 31 | 1 | 1 | 0 | 0 | 0 | 0 | 0 | 32 | 1 |
| Ilisiakos (loan) | 2008–09 | Super League Greece 2 | 21 | 2 | 1 | 0 | 0 | 0 | 0 | 0 | 22 | 2 |
| Kavala | 2010–11 | Super League Greece | 0 | 0 | 0 | 0 | 0 | 0 | 0 | 0 | 0 | 0 |
| Panionios | 2011–12 | Super League Greece | 4 | 0 | 2 | 0 | 0 | 0 | 0 | 0 | 6 | 0 |
| Panionios | 2012–13 | Super League Greece | 25 | 0 | 1 | 0 | 0 | 0 | 0 | 0 | 26 | 0 |
| Panionios | 2013–14 | Super League Greece | 30 | 0 | 3 | 0 | 0 | 0 | 0 | 0 | 33 | 0 |
| Panionios | Total | | 59 | 0 | 6 | 0 | 0 | 0 | 0 | 0 | 65 | 0 |
| Olympiacos | 2014–15 | Super League Greece | 18 | 2 | 0 | 0 | 0 | 0 | 0 | 0 | 18 | 2 |
| Olympiacos | 2015–16 | Super League Greece | 0 | 0 | 3 | 0 | 0 | 0 | 0 | 0 | 3 | 0 |
| Olympiacos | Total | | 18 | 2 | 3 | 0 | 0 | 0 | 0 | 0 | 21 | 2 |
| Sturm Graz | 2015–16 | Austrian Bundesliga | 16 | 0 | 1 | 0 | 0 | 0 | 0 | 0 | 17 | 0 |
| Heart of Midlothian | 2016–17 | Scottish Premiership | 9 | 0 | 3 | 0 | 0 | 0 | 0 | 0 | 12 | 0 |
| Panathinaikos | 2017–18 | Super League Greece | 6 | 0 | 4 | 0 | 0 | 0 | 0 | 0 | 10 | 0 |
| Sturm Graz | 2018–19 | Austrian Bundesliga | 20 | 0 | 2 | 0 | 3 | 0 | 0 | 0 | 25 | 0 |
| Sturm Graz | 2019–20 | Austrian Bundesliga | 27 | 1 | 1 | 0 | 0 | 0 | 0 | 0 | 28 | 1 |
| Sturm Graz | Total | | 47 | 1 | 3 | 0 | 3 | 0 | 0 | 0 | 53 | 1 |
| Ascoli | 2020–21 | Serie B | 15 | 0 | 0 | 0 | 0 | 0 | 0 | 0 | 15 | 0 |
| Ascoli | 2021–22 | Serie B | 12 | 0 | 1 | 0 | 0 | 0 | 0 | 0 | 13 | 0 |
| Ascoli | Total | | 27 | 0 | 1 | 0 | 0 | 0 | 0 | 0 | 28 | 0 |
| Apollon Limassol FC | 2021–22 | Cypriot First Division | 2 | 0 | 0 | 0 | 0 | 0 | 0 | 0 | 2 | 0 |
| Career total | | | 232 | 6 | 23 | 0 | 3 | 0 | 0 | 0 | 258 | 6 |

== Honours ==
Olympiacos

- Super League Greece: 2014–15
- Greek Cup: 2014–15

Apollon Limassol

- Cypriot First Division: 2021–22

=== Individual ===
- Austrian Bundesliga Team of the Year: 2019–20
