= Dimitris Kolovos =

Greek footballer

Personal information
- Full name: Dimitrios Kolovos
- Date of birth: 27 April 1993 (age 33)
- Place of birth: Athens, Greece
- Height: 1.84 m (6 ft 0 in)
- Positions: Attacking midfielder; winger

Team information
- Current team: Panionios
- Number: 10

Youth career
- PAS Oropos

Senior career*
Years	Team	Apps	(Gls)
2010–2013	Panionios	38	(4)
2013–2017	Olympiacos	5	(0)
2013–2015	→ Panionios (loan)	61	(18)
2016–2017	→ Mechelen (loan)	27	(5)
2017–2019	Mechelen	12	(0)
2018	→ Willem II (loan)	3	(0)
2019	→ Omonia (loan)	18	(4)
2019–2021	Panathinaikos	21	(1)
2020–2021	→ Sheriff Tiraspol (loan)	22	(10)
2021–2022	Sheriff Tiraspol	12	(3)
2022	Kocaelispor	14	(2)
2022–2023	Panetolikos	29	(3)
2023–2024	Dewa United	28	(4)
2024–	Panionios	34	(8)

International career
2010	Greece U18	3	(1)
2010–2011	Greece U19	17	(5)
2013	Greece U20	7	(1)
2012–2014	Greece U21	12	(3)
2014–2019	Greece	9	(1)
- * Club domestic league appearances and goals as of 7 March 2026

Dimitris Kolovos (Greek: Δημήτρης Κολοβός; born 27 April 1993) is a Greek professional footballer who plays as an attacking midfielder or a winger for Super League 2 club Panionios.

== Club career ==
=== Panionios ===
Kolovos entered in football by signing in PAS Oropos in the local league of Athens. Playing with PAS Oropos since the beginning of 2009–10 season, he succeeded to win the amateurs' championship in 2009 and promoted in the Delta Ethniki. As his talent became known among the professional teams, needs only a year to sign with Panionios in the Super League. At the beginning he was a member of the U-20 team who took the 3rd place in the U-20 Greek Championship of 2012. At the same time he played mostly as a reserve with the first team . At the beginning of 2012–13 season under the coaching of Dimitrios Eleftheropoulos became a full-time member of the team, ensuring the interest of the Italian club Bologna, as well as the interest of the Greek giants AEK Athens and PAOK.

He is known for his speed and dribbling skills and identified as a high-potential player of Panionios. In January 2012, Panionios rejected a €250,000 transfer offer from Fiorentina during the January. In May 2012, he renewed his contract with the club until 2016. In August 2013 he signed with the Greek champions Olympiacos for a total transfer €750,000, but it is decided to play for one year in his former team Panionios.

=== Olympiacos ===
On 26 September 2015, he made his debut with Olympiacos in a 5–1 home win over PAS Giannina replacing Sebá on second half. On 2 December 2015, he scored his first goal with Olympiacos in all competitions in a 4–0 away win against Panegialios in the Greek Cup. On 7 January 2016, he scored in a 4–1 away win against Chania in the Greek Cup. He finished his first season with the champions having 11 appearances(2 goals, 1 assist) in all competitions.

On 15 June 2016, Kolovos signed a long season loan from Olympiakos with Belgian Pro League club KV Mechelen. On 29 July he made his debut as a late substitute in a 2–0 home loss against Club Brugge. On 10 September, Kolovos netted his first ever Mechelen goal to cap off a 2–0 home victory against Sint-Truidense in Round 6 of the Belgian Pro League. On 22 October 2016, he netted with the head, the second goal sealing a 2–0 home win against Mouscron. On 10 December, he opened the score in a 4–1 away win against Royal Excel Mouscron. On 22 January 2017, he equalized the score in a 2–1 home loss against Westerlo. On 18 February, he scored giving a 2–0 lead to his club against Lokeren but only six minutes later due to a cruciate ligament rupture, after contesting the ball with fellow countryman Georgios Galitsios of Lokeren, he has been substituted. A day later, Mechelen announced that Kolovos suffered a ruptured ACL on his right knee and will be sidelined for 6–8 months.

=== Mechelen ===
Kolovos went on loan at Mechelen from Olympiacos, but despite the injury the Belgian club are still interested in buying the player from the Greek club. On 8 May 2017, Mechelen announced that it has acquired Greek striker from Olympiacos on a three-years contract for a fee of €750,000.

After a very difficult period for the winger marred by injury (235 days to be exact), Kolovos returned to action in an away game against Eupen on 21 October 2017. After a mediocre season with Mechelen (played in 12 Jupiler League matches for Mechelen, failing to contribute with any goals or assists), Kolovos signed a long season contract with Dutch club Willem II on loan from Mechelen.

=== Omonia ===
On 28 December 2018, he agreed to join Omonia on an initial six-month loan deal, with a buy-out clause. On 19 January 2019, in his third appearance with the club was the MVP as he played as a substitute and scored a brace, giving David Ramírez an assist in a 3–1 home win game against Nea Salamis.

On 29 March 2019, Omonia bought the player from Mechelen, by activating the purchase option set by the two teams in December 2018, on a two-and-a-half-year contract for a fee of €120,000. The Cypriots had to decide what they would do before 31 March 2019, as many Greek and foreign clubs ask about the ownership status of the Greek international.

=== Panathinaikos ===
On 18 July 2019 Panathinaikos have confirmed the signing of a three-year contract with Greek international for an undisclosed fee. The Greek midfielder began to get back on track his career with Omonia in the second half of the 2018–19 season, contributing with four goals and one assist in 18 Cypriot First Division matches. Kolovos commented on his transfer to Panathinaikos: "I am very happy to become a member of the Panathinaikos family. This is a big club. I want to remain healthy in order to help the team achieve its goals. For me, Panathinaikos represents a great opportunity, and I want to prove that I can play at this level knowing how large this club is. I thank Mr. Dabizas and Mr. Donis for their belief which they have showed in me. I also express my thanks to the supporters who have sent me welcoming messages over the course of the past two days."

On 11 September 2020, Kolovos will continue his career with last year's Moldovan National Division champion Sheriff Tiraspol, on a long-season loan from Panathinaikos. At the end of the 2020-21 season with 12 goals (and 9 assists) in all competitions helped the club to win the 2020-21 title.

=== Sheriff Tiraspol ===
On 28 July 2021, Kolovos will continue his career in Sheriff Tiraspol, this time with a regular transfer, as he was released by mutual consent from Panathinaikos, for a year contract with an undisclosed fee. There was interest from Turkish and Israeli clubs, but he chose to join a team that plays in the UEFA Champions League qualifiers.

On 17 August 2021, Kolovos with a volleyed strike gave Sheriff a dominant lead in a 3–0 home win game against Dinamo Zagreb in the Champions League playoffs 1st round. On 25 September 2021, he scored a brace in a triumphic 7–0 away win against Dinamo-Auto Tiraspol.

=== Kocaelispor ===
On 1 February 2022, Kolovos will continue his career in Kocaelispor, with a regular transfer, as he was released by mutual consent from Sheriff Tiraspol, for a year-and-a-half contract with an undisclosed fee.

=== Panetolikos ===
On 24 August 2022, Kolovos returned to Greece, joining Super League club Panetolikos on a one-year contract.

=== Dewa United ===
On 21 June 2023, Kolovos joined Indonesian Liga 1 club Dewa United on a free transfer.

== International career ==
Kolovos has a plural international career in youth Greece squads. On 9 November 2014 Greece head coach Claudio Ranieri announced the first call up of Kolovos (replaced injured Salpingidis) for the match against Faroe Islands. He made his international debut four days later in a friendly home match against Serbia.

On 19 March 2019, Greece head coach Angelos Anastasiadis announced the call up of Kolovos for the match against Liechtenstein and Bosnia and Herzegovina for UEFA Euro 2020.

On 26 March 2019, Kolovos heading home powerfully hit goal from a great Zeca right-wing cross in the 85th minute equalizing in a 2–2 finish against Bosnia and Herzegovina against 10-man Bosnia-Herzegovina at the Stadion Bilino Polje in Zenica in their second Euro 2020 qualifying match. It was his first goal with the national team.

=== International goals ===
Scores and results list Greece's goal tally first.

No.	Date	Venue	Opponent	Score	Result	Competition
1.	26 March 2019	Bilino Polje Stadium, Zenica, Bosnia and Herzegovina	Bosnia and Herzegovina	2–2	2–2	UEFA Euro 2020 qualification

== Career statistics ==
As of 8 March 2024

Appearances and goals by club, season and competition
Club	Season	League			Cup		Continental		Total	
Club	Season	Division	Apps	Goals	Apps	Goals	Apps	Goals	Apps	Goals
Panionios	2010–11	Super League Greece	2	0	0	0	—		2	0
Panionios	2011–12	Super League Greece	12	1	1	0	—		13	1
Panionios	2012–13	Super League Greece	24	3	1	0	—		25	3
Panionios	2013–14	Super League Greece	32	7	5	1	—		37	8
Panionios	2014–15	Super League Greece	29	11	6	4	—		35	15
Panionios	Total		99	22	13	5	0	0	112	27
Olympiacos	2015–16	Super League Greece	5	0	6	2	—		11	2
Mechelen	2016–17	Belgian First Division A	27	5	2	1	—		29	6
Mechelen	2017–18	Belgian First Division A	12	0	1	0	—		13	0
Mechelen	Total		39	5	3	1	0	0	42	6
Willem II	2018–19	Eredivisie	3	0	0	0	—		3	0
Omonia	2018–19	Cypriot First Division	18	4	1	0	—		19	4
Panathinaikos	2019–20	Super League Greece	21	1	2	1	—		23	2
Sheriff	2020–21	Moldovan National Division	22	10	3	2	1 (Note: Appearance in UEFA Europa League)	0	26	12
Sheriff	2021–22	Moldovan National Division	12	3	0	0	10 (Note: Appearances in UEFA Champions League)	1	22	4
Sheriff	Total		34	13	3	2	11	1	48	16
Kocaelispor	2021–22	TFF First League	14	2	0	0	—		14	2
Panetolikos	2022–23	Super League Greece	29	3	1	0	—		30	3
Dewa United	2023–24	Indonesian Liga 1	23	3	0	0	—		23	3
Career total			285	53	29	11	11	1	325	65

== Honours ==
Olympiacos

- Super League Greece: 2015–16

Sheriff Tiraspol

- Divizia Națională: 2020–21

Individual

- Super League Greece Young Player of the Season: 2013–14
