= Georgios Zygogiannis =

Greek footballer

Personal information
- Full name: Georgios Zygogiannis
- Date of birth: 5 August 1994 (age 32)
- Place of birth: Athens, Greece
- Height: 1.87 m (6 ft 2 in)
- Position: Defender

Team information
- Current team: Panelefsiniakos

Youth career
- –2012: Panionios

Senior career*
Years	Team	Apps	(Gls)
2012–2013	Panionios		
2013–2014	AEK Larnaca		
2014–2015	Fostiras		
2016–	Panelefsiniakos		
- * Club domestic league appearances and goals

Georgios Zygogiannis (Greek: Γεώργιος Ζυγογιάννης; born 5 August 1994) is a Greek footballer who plays for Panelefsiniakos as defender.

== Career ==
On 7 August 2013, Zygogiannis agreed to sign contract with AEK Larnaca in Cyprus.
