= Claudio Rivero =

Uruguayan footballer (born 1985)

Personal information
- Full name: Claudio Domingo Rivero Rodríguez
- Date of birth: 14 April 1985 (age 41)
- Place of birth: Montevideo, Uruguay
- Height: 1.82 m (6 ft 0 in)
- Position: Defensive midfielder

Team information
- Current team: Rentistas

Youth career
- Fénix

Senior career*
Years	Team	Apps	(Gls)
2005–2013	Fénix	146	(3)
2010	→ Hapoel Ramat Gan (loan)	9	(0)
2012	→ Antofagasta (loan)	28	(0)
2013	Panionios	2	(0)
2014–2015	Cienciano	0	(0)
2015	Deportivo Quito	17	(1)
2015–2016	Deportivo Pasto	5	(0)
2016	Fénix	10	(1)
2016–2018	Defensor Sporting	38	(0)
2019	LDU Portoviejo		
2019–	Rentistas	10	(0)
- * Club domestic league appearances and goals as of 22:03, 8 December 2019 (UTC)

Claudio Domingo Rivero Rodríguez (Spanish pronunciation: [ˈklawðjo ðoˈmiŋɡo riˈβeɾo], born 14 April 1985) is a Uruguayan footballer who currently plays for C.A. Rentistas as a defensive midfielder.

== Career ==
In February 2019, Rivero joined LDU Portoviejo.

== Titles ==
Fénix

- Uruguayan Segunda División (2): 2006–07, 2008–09
