= Mattheos Maroukakis =

Greek footballer

Personal information
- Date of birth: 4 January 1990 (age 36)
- Place of birth: Athens, Greece
- Height: 1.85 m (6 ft 1 in)
- Position: Centre forward

Youth career
- 2005–2007: Keravnos Agios Dimitrios

Senior career*
Years	Team	Apps	(Gls)
2007–2013	Kallithea	143	(35)
2013–2014	Panionios	3	(0)
2014	Ionikos	13	(3)
2014–2015	Panachaiki	29	(11)
2015–2016	AEL	34	(13)
2017	Trikala	4	(1)
2017–2018	Asteras Amaliada	21	(11)
2018–2019	Aittitos Spata	9	(3)
2019	Panargiakos		
2019–2022	Kallithea	23	(10)

International career
2009	Greece U19	4	(1)
2011–2012	Greece U21	1	(0)
- * Club domestic league appearances and goals as of 13 March 2022

Mattheos Maroukakis (Greek: Ματθαίος Μαρουκάκης; born 4 January 1990) is a Greek former professional footballer who played as a centre forward.

== Early years ==
Maroukakis was born in Athens but was raised in Lemnos. He made his first football steps in the local amateur side Keravnos Agios Dimitrios. Unlike other children starting at an early age their involvement with football, he decided to begin in the age of 12! In the summer of 2007, aged 17, he went to Athens to study computer developing and started training with the youth squad of Kallithea in order not to completely lose contact with football, as a student. He started as a centre back but later he decided to play as a forward. A year later, on 1 July 2008, he signed a five-year professional contract and moved to the first squad.

== Career ==
He played in Kallithea for almost 6 years making a total of 143 appearances and scored 35 goals. On 1 July 2013, he moved to Super League club Panionios where he had in fact minimum participation (his first out of 3 appearances was on 18 August 2013 against OFI in the Theodoros Vardinogiannis Stadium) so on 2 January 2014, he moved to Gamma Ethniki club Ionikos. In the summer of 2014 he moved to Patras based Football League club Panachaiki where he had a full season with 29 appearances and 11 goals. On 31 July 2015 he signed a three-year contract with AEL where he had an excellent beginning scoring 7 goals in the first 8 league games. At the end of season, he celebrated the championship as the club promoted to Super League. On 31 December 2016, Maroukakis left the team by mutual agreement. On 2 January 2017 he joined Trikala. After only two months he terminated his contract stating personal problems.

On 9 September 2018, he joined Aittitos Spata, ahead of the 2018–19 season.
