= Giannis Siderakis =

Greek footballer

Personal information
- Full name: Ioannis Siderakis
- Date of birth: 16 November 1987 (age 38)
- Place of birth: Athens, Greece
- Height: 1.83 m (6 ft 0 in)
- Position: Goalkeeper

Team information
- Current team: Chalkida

Youth career
- –2006: Olympiacos

Senior career*
| Years | Team | Apps | (Gls) |
| 2005–2006 | Olympiacos | 0 | (0) |
| 2006–2007 | Olympiakos Loutraki | | |
| 2007–2008 | AE Giannena | 8 | (0) |
| 2008–2010 | Chaidari | 34 | (0) |
| 2010 | Apollon Smyrnis | 0 | (0) |
| 2010–2011 | Thrasyvoulos | 26 | (0) |
| 2011–2013 | Panionios | 15 | (0) |
| 2013–2014 | AEL Kalloni | 25 | (0) |
| 2014–2015 | Doxa Katokopias | 14 | (0) |
| 2015 | AEL Kalloni | 0 | (0) |
| 2015–2016 | Aris | 3 | (0) |
| 2016–2017 | Trikala | 7 | (0) |
| 2018 | Agios Ierotheos | 0 | (0) |
| 2022– | Chalkida | | |
- * Club domestic league appearances and goals as of 8 May 2018(UTC)

Giannis Siderakis (Greek: Γιάννης Σιδεράκης; born 16 November 1987) is a Greek professional football player.

Until 2006 he was a member of the youth team of Olympiacos.

== Career ==
He started in the youth section of the Olympiacos and until 2006 was a member of the u17 team. In 2007, he was transferred to AO Haidari, where he played 2.5 years. Then he fought Apollo Smyrna in the second half of the season in 2009-10 and in 2010-11 was an eventful year in Thrasivoulos Filis.

=== Panionios ===
In the summer of 2011 he joined Panionios, which debuted in the Superleague on August 28, the first day of the season 2011–12, against Ergotelis at Nea Smyrni Stadium. One of the top moments in neosmyrniotiko club was on January 11, 2012, in a home cup match against Panathinaikos (0-0, 4-3 penalties) when he saved two chipped penalty that executed by Karagounis and Leto gave the qualification to Panionios.

=== AEL Kalloni, Cyprus and return ===
Between 2013 and 2014 he defended the goal of AEL Kalloni, where he had 25 appearances in the league, followed a years in the Cyprus league where he played with the colors of Glory Katokopia. In the following period (2015–16) returned to Kalloni but was sold immediately to Aris. He made his debut in a 3–1 win over Apollon Kalamarias. Two weeks later against Eordaikos he made a number of crucial saves to keep nine-man Aris in the game for an eventual 2–1 win.
