= Leonidas Argyropoulos =

Greek footballer (born 1990)

Personal information
- Date of birth: 29 May 1990 (age 36)
- Place of birth: Corinth, Greece
- Height: 1.81 m (5 ft 11 1/2 in)
- Position: Right-back

Senior career*
Years	Team	Apps	(Gls)
2008–2012	Asteras Tripolis	48	(0)
2012–2013	Platanias	22	(0)
2013–2014	Apollon Smyrnis	25	(1)
2014–2017	Panionios	36	(0)
2017	Iraklis	12	(0)
2018–2019	OFI	22	(0)
2019–2020	Levadiakos	14	(1)
2020–2021	Aspropyrgos	18	(1)
2021–2022	Nafpaktiakos Asteras	20	(0)
2022–2024	PAS Korinthos	42	(0)
2024–2026	Loutraki		

International career
2007	Greece U17	1	(0)
2007–2009	Greece U19	15	(0)
2009–2011	Greece U21	4	(0)
- * Club domestic league appearances and goals as of 2 February 2020

Leonidas Argyropoulos (Greek: Λεωνίδας Αργυρόπουλος; born 29 May 1990) is a Greek professional footballer who plays as a right-back.

== Club career ==
On 20 January 2009, Argyropoulos made his professional debut in the fifth round of the 2008–09 Greek Football Cup, playing for Asteras Tripolis in a 2–0 victory over Iraklis.
