= Konstantinos Panagiotoudis =

Greek footballer (born in 1994)

Personal information
- Date of birth: 3 December 1994 (age 31)
- Place of birth: Thessaloniki, Greece
- Height: 1.80 m (5 ft 11 in)
- Position: Midfielder

Team information
- Current team: Zakynthos
- Number: 68

Youth career
- 2006–2011: PAOK

Senior career*
Years	Team	Apps	(Gls)
2011–2016	PAOK	4	(1)
2013–2014	→ Panionios (loan)	30	(0)
2014–2015	→ Veria (loan)	0	(0)
2015	→ Apollon Kalamarias (loan)	9	(0)
2015–2016	→ Langadas (loan)	0	(0)
2016–2017	Langadas	0	(0)
2017–2018	Doxa Drama	7	(0)
2017–2018	→ Iraklis (loan)	23	(4)
2018–2019	Iraklis	25	(1)
2019–2022	Chania	66	(0)
2022–2026	Makedonikos	95	(2)
2026	Chania	10	(0)
2026–	Zakynthos	3	(0)

International career
2012	Greece U18	3	(0)
2012	Greece U19	1	(0)
- * Club domestic league appearances and goals as of 19 September 2026

Konstantinos Panagiotoudis (Greek: Κωνσταντίνος Παναγιωτούδης, born 3 December 1994) is a Greek professional footballer who plays as a midfielder for Super League 2 club Zakynthos.
