= Manos Zacharakis =

Greek footballer

Manolis Zacharakis
Personal information
- Full name: Emmanouil Zacharakis
- Date of birth: 10 August 1992 (age 34)
- Place of birth: Chania, Crete, Greece
- Height: 1.80 m (5 ft 11 in)
- Positions: Right back; centre back

Youth career
- 2009: OFI

Senior career*
Years	Team	Apps	(Gls)
2010–2013	OFI	23	(0)
2013–2015	Panionios	11	(0)
2015	AEL	2	(0)

International career
2012	Greece U21	1	(0)
- * Club domestic league appearances and goals as of 24 July 2015

Manolis "Manos" Zacharakis (Greek: Μανώλης "Μάνος" Ζαχαράκης; born 10 August 1992) is a Greek professional footballer who last played as a defender, for AEL in the Greek Football League.

== Career ==
Zacharakis started his career from the youth teams of OFI. On 1 July 2010 he signed a professional contract and moved to the first squad where he managed to play for almost 3 years. On 18 June 2013 he moved to Super League club Panionios. On 31 January 2015 he signed a 2,5 years contract with AEL.

Zacharakis played for Greece U21, in a friendly game against Austria on 14 November 2012 in Argos.
