= Dimitris Aslanidis =

Greek footballer (born 1989)

Personal information
- Full name: Dimitrios Aslanidis
- Date of birth: 16 August 1989 (age 37)
- Place of birth: Thessaloniki, Greece
- Height: 1.78 m (5 ft 10 in)
- Positions: Midfielder; left back

Youth career
- 2005–2006: P.A.O.N.E.

Senior career*
Years	Team	Apps	(Gls)
2006–2008	Iraklis	1	(0)
2008	Olympiacos Volos	14	(0)
2009–2010	P.A.O.N.E.	20	(0)
2010–2012	Anagennisi Epanomi	50	(2)
2012	Aris	7	(0)
2013	Panionios	0	(0)
2013–2014	Asteras Magoula	12	(2)
- * Club domestic league appearances and goals

Dimitris Aslanidis (Greek: Δημήτρης Ασλανίδης; born 16 August 1989) is a Greek former professional footballer who played as a midfielder.

== Club career ==
Aslanidis started his career in P.A.O.N.E. during 2005 before being transferred to Iraklis in 2006, he later moved to Olympiacos Volos before returning to P.A.O.N.E. and spending two years to Anagennisi Epanomi. In 2012, he was transferred to Aris. He then moved to Panionios in 2013, and later joined Asteras Magoula F.C., where he retired in 2014.

== Personal life ==
In 2011, he participated in the reality show FAB 5, the Greek edition of Queer Eye for the Straight Guy.
