= Nikos Papadopoulos (footballer, born 1990) =

Greek footballer

Personal information
- Full name: Nikolaos Papadopoulos
- Date of birth: 11 April 1990 (age 36)
- Place of birth: Athens, Greece
- Height: 1.96 m (6 ft 5 in)
- Position: Goalkeeper

Team information
- Current team: Asteras Tripolis
- Number: 1

Youth career
- –2010: Olympiacos

Senior career*
Years	Team	Apps	(Gls)
2010–2012	Olympiacos	0	(0)
2012–2013	Fortuna Düsseldorf II	10	(0)
2013–2016	Panionios	53	(0)
2016–2017	Atromitos	0	(0)
2017–2018	Lamia	26	(0)
2018–	Asteras Tripolis	182	(1)
- * Club domestic league appearances and goals as of 20 October 2026

Nikos Papadopoulos (Greek: Νίκος Παπαδόπουλος, born 11 April 1990) is a Greek professional footballer who plays as a goalkeeper for Super League club Asteras Tripolis.

== Career ==
On 16 May 2018, Papadopoulos signed a two-year contract with Asteras Tripolis. On 13 May 2019, he put pen to paper to a contract extension, until the summer of 2022.

On 21 March 2021, Papadopoulos scored the first, and only to date, goal of his career, through a powerful shot from the penalty area in the 97th minute of play. This goal, which helped Asteras achieve a 2–2 draw in their match against Panathinaikos for the Super League Greece championship playoffs, marked the first time a goalkeeper scored a goal in the Greek top tier since Arian Beqaj in 2001, and in Greek professional football in general since Gennadios Xenodochof in 2015.

== Career statistics ==
As of match played 14 May 2026

Appearances and goals by club, season and competition
Club	Season	League			Cup		Continental		Other		Total	
Club	Season	Division	Apps	Goals	Apps	Goals	Apps	Goals	Apps	Goals	Apps	Goals
Fortuna Düsseldorf	2012–13	Bundesliga	0	0	0	0	—		—		0	0
Panionios	2013–14	Super League Greece	5	0	5	0	—		—		10	0
Panionios	2014–15	Super League Greece	24	0	5	0	—		—		29	0
Panionios	2015–16	Super League Greece	12	0	2	0	—		—		14	0
Panionios	Total		41	0	12	0	—		—		53	0
Atromitos	2016–17	Super League Greece	0	0	5	0	—		—		5	0
Lamia	2017–18	Super League Greece	25	0	1	0	—		—		26	0
Asteras Tripolis	2018–19	Super League Greece	22	0	2	0	—		—		24	0
Asteras Tripolis	2019–20	Super League Greece	30	0	2	0	—		—		32	0
Asteras Tripolis	2020–21	Super League Greece	21	1	1	0	—		—		22	1
Asteras Tripolis	2021–22	Super League Greece	15	0	1	0	—		—		16	0
Asteras Tripolis	2022–23	Super League Greece	26	0	1	0	—		—		27	0
Asteras Tripolis	2023–24	Super League Greece	18	0	2	0	—		—		30	0
Asteras Tripolis	2024–25	Super League Greece	16	0	5	0	—		—		21	0
Asteras Tripolis	2025–26	Super League Greece	28	0	0	0	—		—		28	0
Asteras Tripolis	Total		176	1	14	0	—		—		190	1
Career Total			242	1	32	0	—		—		274	1
