= Dimitrios Petkakis =

Greek footballer

Personal information
- Full name: Dimitrios Petkakis
- Date of birth: 1 August 1983 (age 43)
- Place of birth: Thessaloniki, Greece
- Height: 1.78 m (5 ft 10 in)
- Position: Defender

Senior career*
Years	Team	Apps	(Gls)
2000–2001	Ampelokipi Thessaloniki		
2002–2006	Apollon Kalamarias	35	(2)
2006–2008	Veria	20	(0)
2008–2011	Kavala	32	(1)
2011–2012	Panionios	21	(0)
2012–2013	AEP Paphos	10	(0)
2013	Olympiacos Volos	21	(1)
2013–2014	Aiginiakos F.C.	11	(0)
2015–	Irinoupoli F.C.	0	(0)
- * Club domestic league appearances and goals as of 4 January 2014

Dimitrios Petkakis (Greek: Δημήτριος Πετκάκης; born 1 August 1983) is a Greek footballer. He currently plays for Irinoupoli F.C. in A1 EPS Imathias.

== Career ==
He started his career playing for Apollon Kalamarias and Veria In the summer of 2008 he moved to Kavala He scored his first goal against his former club Apollon Kalamarias in a 2–0 home win. He totally completed 32 appearances having scored 1 goal. In summer 2011 he moved to Panionios He stayed there for one whole season. He completed this season having made 21 appearances but he did not manage to score any goal in the league. In summer 2012 he moved to AEP Paphos. He completed 10 appearances. In winter 2013 he moved to Olympiacos Volos He made his debut against Asteras Tripolis He scored his first goal against Pierikos in a 4–1 home win. At the beginning of 2013/14 season he signed a one-year contract with Aiginiakos
