= Stathis Rokas =

Greek footballer

Personal information
- Full name: Efstathios Rokas
- Date of birth: 18 September 1984 (age 42)
- Place of birth: Athens, Greece
- Height: 1.81 m (5 ft 11 1/2 in)
- Position: Midfielder

Senior career*
Years	Team	Apps	(Gls)
2002–2004	Atromitos	25	(0)
2004–2007	Ionikos	16	(0)
2007	→ Vyzas (loan)	14	(0)
2007–2008	Thrasyvoulos	41	(5)
2008–2010	Asteras Tripolis	18	(0)
2010–2011	Olympiacos Volos	26	(0)
2011–2013	Panionios	35	(1)
2013–2015	Olympiacos Volos	55	(0)
2015–2016	Panachaiki	13	(0)
2016–2017	Panelefsiniakos	8	(1)
2017–2018	Fostiras	17	(0)
2018–2021	Olympiacos Volos	50	(1)
2021–2022	Rigas Feraios Velestino	12	(2)

International career
- Greece U21
- * Club domestic league appearances and goals as of 20 August 2015

Stathis Rokas (Greek: Στάθης Ρόκας; born 18 September 1984) is a Greek former professional footballer.

== Career ==
Rokas began his professional playing career by signing with Atromitos in May 2002. He would play for Ionikos, Vyzas and Thrasyvoulos before joining Asteras Tripoli in January 2009.
