= Efthymis Kouloucheris =

Greek footballer

Personal information
- Full name: Efthymios Kouloucheris
- Date of birth: 10 March 1981 (age 45)
- Place of birth: Karditsa, Greece
- Height: 1.78 m (5 ft 10 in)
- Position: Defender

Senior career*
Years	Team	Apps	(Gls)
1998–2003	Proodeftiki	48	(0)
2003–2006	Olympiacos	3	(0)
2006–2012	Aris	68	(1)
2012–2014	Panionios	33	(1)
2014	Anagennisi Karditsa	2	(0)
- * Club domestic league appearances and goals

Efthymis Kouloucheris (Greek: Ευθύμης Κουλουχέρης; born 10 March 1981) is a Greek former footballer who played as a centre back.

== Career ==
He started his career at Proodeftiki and later at Olympiacos. He was transferred to Aris Thessaloniki F.C. in January 2006. He scored his first goal for the club with a header against Xanthi in a match which ended 1–0. Before the beginning of 2012 he terminated his contract with the club. In January 2012 Efthimios Kouloucheris signed a new contract with Panionios until 30.06.2013 .

== Honours ==
=== Club ===
Olympiacos

- Alpha Ethniki: 2002–03, 2004–05
- Greek Cup: 2004–05
