= Nikos Pantidos =

Greek footballer (born 1991)

Personal information
- Full name: Nikolaos Pantidos
- Date of birth: 19 April 1991 (age 35)
- Place of birth: Athens, Greece
- Height: 1.85 m (6 ft 1 in)
- Position: Defender

Youth career
- 2004–2008: Panathinaikos

Senior career*
Years	Team	Apps	(Gls)
2008–2010	Panathinaikos	2	(0)
2009	→ Ilisiakos (loan)	0	(0)
2009–2010	→ Egaleo (loan)	22	(0)
2010–2012	Ethnikos Asteras	25	(0)
2012–2013	Aris	11	(0)
2013–2015	Panionios	51	(0)
2015–2016	Dukla Banská Bystrica	10	(1)
2016–2017	Aris Limassol	11	(0)
2017	OFI	12	(0)
2018–2019	Karaiskakis	27	(0)
2021	Santorini	24	(2)
2022	Panionios	4	(0)

International career
2008	Greece U17	9	(0)
- * Club domestic league appearances and goals as of 25 June 2019

Nikos Pantidos (Greek: Νίκος Παντίδος; born 19 April 1991) is a Greek professional footballer who plays as a defender.

== Career ==
Pantidos started playing football at Ethnikos academy in Pallini. In 2004, he joined Panathinaikos football academy and became an important member of their youth team which lead the club's officials to offer him his first professional contract. On 30 January 2008, Pantidos signed a three-year deal with the Panathinaikos A-team. In 2013 he joined Panionios, and in 2014 he became their captain. On 6 August 2016, after six months with the Slovak club Dukla Banská Bystrica, Pantidos signed a year contract with Cypriot club Aris Limassol for an undisclosed fee.

He has represented Greece U17.
