= Konstantinos Stavrothanasopoulos =

Greek footballer

Personal information
- Date of birth: 6 February 1992 (age 34)
- Place of birth: Agrinio, Greece
- Height: 1.80 m (5 ft 11 in)
- Position: Right winger

Team information
- Current team: AEK Athens (Deputy Director of Football)

Youth career
- 1998–2004: Petrochori
- 2004–2007: Elpides Agriniou
- 2007–2011: Panionios

Senior career*
Years	Team	Apps	(Gls)
2011–2014	Panionios	19	(0)
2012–2013	→ Thrasyvoulos (loan)	28	(3)
2015–2017	Akropolis IF	61	(20)
2018–2019	IK Frej	14	(2)
2019	VPS	14	(1)
2020	IFK Haninge	23	(3)
2021–2022	Fostiras	11	(1)
2022–2023	GS Marko	6	(0)

International career
2010–2012	Greece U19	1	(0)
- * Club domestic league appearances and goals as of 29 November 2021

Konstantinos Stavrothanasopoulos (Greek: Κωνσταντίνος Σταυροθανασόπουλος; born 6 February 1992) is a Greek former professional footballer who played as a right winger, currently deputy director of football of Super League club AEK Athens.

== Career ==
Stavrothanasopoulos started his career at the youth teams of Panionios F.C, and was promoted to the first team in July 2011. In December 2011, he signed a professional three years contract with the club. After a loaned year in Thrasyvoulos F.C., Stavrothanasopoulos returned to Panionios and stayed there for two more years. In February 2015, he signed a contract with the Swedish Division 1 club Akropolis IF. He has also been a member of the Greece U19. He made one appearance in September 2011 against Montenegro U19.

On 8 December 2017, after two seasons with Akropolis IF, he transferred to Superettan club IK Frej for an undisclosed fee. On 18 February 2018, he scored in his debut in a 2–1 away Svenska Cupen win against Jönköpings Södra IF.

On 5 March 2019 he signed a 10-months contract with Veikkausliiga club VPS. On 13 June 2020, he signed a 6-months contract with Ettan Swedish club IFK Haninge. In October 2021, he moved to Fostiras F.C. in Gamma Ethniki. In August 2022, Stavrothanasopoulos joined GS Marko.
