= Vasilios Bouzas =

Greek footballer (born 1993)

Personal information
- Date of birth: 30 June 1993 (age 33)
- Place of birth: Athens, Greece
- Height: 1.73 m (5 ft 8 in)
- Position: Midfielder

Team information
- Current team: Pannaxiakos

Youth career
- 2009–2011: Panionios

Senior career*
Years	Team	Apps	(Gls)
2011–2016	Panionios	22	(0)
2015–2016	→ Kallithea (loan)	21	(0)
2016–2017	Panegialios	30	(2)
2017−2018	Ergotelis	23	(0)
2018−2020	Wadi Degla	41	(1)
2021	El Gaish	3	(0)
2022	Asteras Vlachioti	7	(1)
2022−2023	Veria	7	(0)
2023−2024	Anagennisi Karditsa	40	(3)
2024−2025	Ethnikos Neo Keramidi	23	(1)
2025−2026	PAS Pyrgos		
2026−	Pannaxiakos		

International career^{‡}
2011–2012	Greece U19	15	(0)
2014	Greece U21	2	(0)
- * Club domestic league appearances and goals as of 15 June 2025 ‡ National team caps and goals as of 30 August 2017

Vasilios Bouzas (Greek: Βασίλειος Μπούζας; born 30 June 1993) is a Greek professional footballer who plays as a midfielder for Gamma Ethniki club Pannaxiakos.

== Club career ==
Bouzas grew up in Peristeri and started his career at the youth teams of Panionios and was promoted to the first team on 8 July 2011. In total, he played for four years with the Blue-Reds amassing a total of 32 caps, all playing in the centre midfielder position. He spent his last season under contract with Panionios on loan with Football League side Kallithea. He then moved to fellow 2nd tier outfit Panegialios in the summer of 2016, before joining Ergotelis, also in the Football League on 29 August 2017. His performances with Ergotelis impressed manager Takis Gonias, who requested club owner Maged Samy, to arrange for Bouzas' transfer to his Egyptian Premier League side Wafi Degla in the summer of 2018. He continue his career in multiple teams in Egypt and Greece like El Gaish, Asteras Vlachioti, Veria and Anagennisi Karditsa until he sign with Ethnikos Keramidi in August 2024.

== International career ==
Bouzas has represented Greece internationally with the U-19 and U-21 outfits.

== Career statistics ==
As of matches played 11 March 2020

Club	Season	League			Cup		Other		Total	
Club	Season	Division	Apps	Goals	Apps	Goals	Apps	Goals	Apps	Goals
Panionios	2011–12	Super League Greece	2	0	0	0	—		2	0
Panionios	2012–13	Super League Greece	2	0	2	0	—		4	0
Panionios	2012–13	Super League Greece	5	0	3	0	—		8	0
Panionios	2014–15	Super League Greece	13	0	5	0	—		18	0
Total			22	0	10	0	—		32	0
Kallithea	2015–16	Football League	21	0	5	0	—		26	0
Total			21	0	5	0	—		26	0
Panegialios	2016–17	Football League	30	2	2	0	—		32	2
Total			30	2	2	0	—		32	2
Ergotelis	2017–18	Football League	23	0	2	0	—		25	0
Total			23	0	2	0	—		25	0
Wadi Degla	2018–19	Egyptian Premier League	32	1	0	0	—		32	1
Wadi Degla	2019–20	Egyptian Premier League	9	0	0	0	—		9	0
Total			41	1	2	0	—		41	1
Career total			137	3	19	0	—		156	3
