= Theodoros Kolokotronis Stadium =

Football stadium in Tripoli, Greece

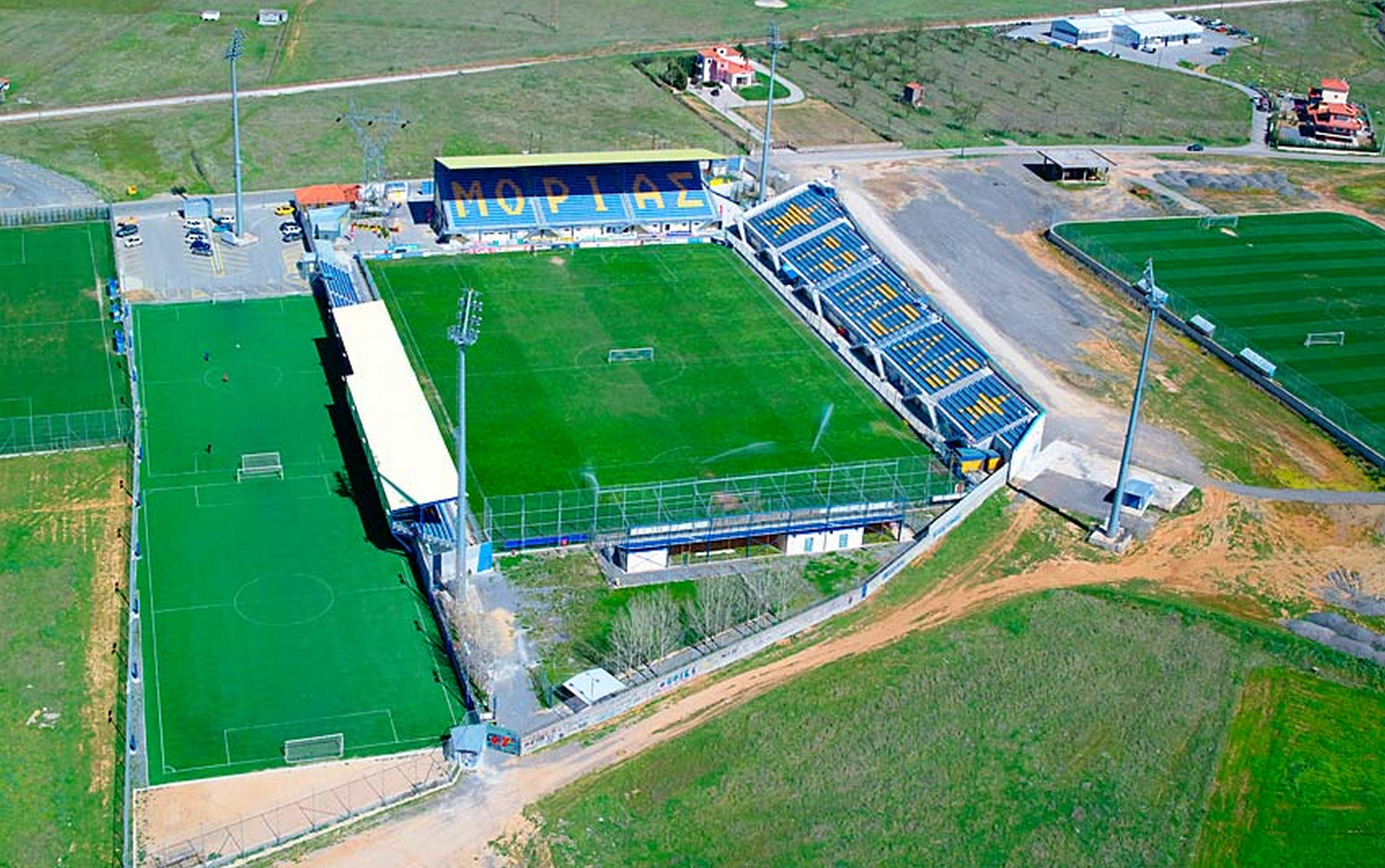
- Interactive map of Theodoros Kolokotronis Stadium
- Location: Tripoli, Greece
- Coordinates: 37°30′9″N 22°23′19″E
- Owner: Asteras Tripolis FC
- Operator: Asteras Tripolis FC
- Capacity: 7,423
- Surface: Grass
- Scoreboard: Yes
- Record attendance: 6,150; Asteras Tripolis vs Olympiacos (27 November 2011)
- Field size: 105 x 68 m

Construction
- Built: 1979

Tenant
- Asteras Tripolis FC

Theodoros Kolokotronis Stadium (Greek: Γήπεδο Θεόδωρος Κολοκοτρώνης), formerly known as Asteras Tripolis Stadium, is a football stadium in Tripoli, Greece. The stadium is the home stadium of Asteras Tripolis. The stadium holds 7,423 seats.

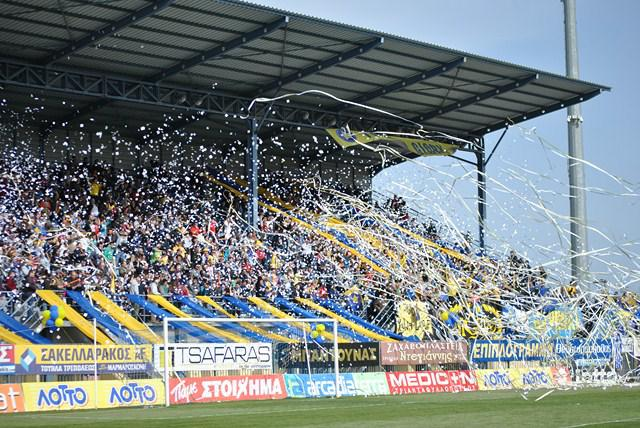
Asteras Tripolis fans at the North Stand.

== History ==
The stadium was built in 1979, but until 2005 Asteras Tripolis competed in the Third Division and earlier in the Fourth Division and in local leagues of Arcadia, was a small stadium with a small capacity as it had a stand of about 100 seats. After the promotion of the team to the Second Division, the stadium was renovated and its capacity expanded, including the construction of the eastern stand, which also houses the offices of the club, gym, changing rooms, funeral parlor, etc. In 2007, after the promotion of Asteras Tripolis to the Super League the western stand was built, where the press booths and VIP seats are housed, while a small stand was also added on the south side for use mainly by the fans of the visiting team. In 2008, the north stand was built. In 2010, the south stand was rebuilt and extended. In 2015, on the occasion of the participation of Asteras Tripolis in the groups of the 2015–16 Europa League, for the second time in history and the second consecutive parallel but also the fourth year in a row of the team's presence in the institution in general (the first two only in the qualifiers), the stadium underwent various important renovation interventions, mainly in its interior spaces, such as the changing rooms and the press room, etc.

On 27 November 2011, in the match between Asteras Tripolis vs Olympicacos for the 11th game of the Super League the stadium's attendance record was achieved with 6,150 tickets.

On 22 November 2012, the stadium was renamed in honour of the hero of the Greek War of Independence, Theodoros Kolokotronis.
