= 2012–13 PAS Giannina F.C. season =

PAS Giannina
2012–13 season
- Chairman: Giorgos Christovasilis
- Manager: Giannis Christopoulos
- Stadium: Zosimades Stadium, Ioannina
- Super League: 5th
- Greek Cup: Quarter-finals, eliminated by Olympiacos
- Top goalscorer: League: Ilic; 10 goals All: Ilic; 11 goals
- Highest home attendance: 4052; Olympiacos
- Lowest home attendance: 673; Levadiakos
- Average home league attendance: 2154

The 2012–13 season is PAS Giannina F.C.'s 18th competitive season in the top flight of Greek football, 3rd season in the Super League Greece, and 47th year in existence as a football club. They also compete in the Greek Cup.

== Players ==
Updated:-

No.	Name	Nationality	Position(s)	Place of birth	Date of birth	Signed from	Notes
Goalkeepers
1	Karim Fegrouche	(Morocco)	GK	Fes, Morocco	14 February 1982	(Morocco) Wydad Casablanca	
13	Charalambos Tabasis	(Greece)	GK	Athens, Greece	10 May 1986	(Greece) Diagoras	
66	Apostolos Bakolas	(Greece)	GK	Arta, Greece	10 October 1993	(Greece) Iraklis Psachna	
89	Nikos Babaniotis	(Greece)	GK	Athens, Greece	28 June 1989	(Greece) Panetolikos	
Defenders
2	Georgios Dasios (C)	(Greece)	RB	Ioannina, Greece	12 May 1983	-	
4	Marios Oikonomou	(Greece)	CB	Ioannina, Greece	6 October 1992	(Greece) PAS Giannina U20	
5	Tasos Pantos	(Greece)	RB	Korydallos, Greece	5 May 1976	(Greece) Olympiacos	
6	Alexios Michail	(Greece)	CB	Ioannina, Greece	18 August 1986	(Greece) Panserraikos	
8	Themistoklis Tzimopoulos	(Greece)	CB	Kozani, Greece	20 November 1985	(Greece) Ethnikos Asteras	
20	Simon Rrumbullaku	(Albania) (Greece)	LB	Rafina, Greece	30 December 1991	(Greece) Kalamata	
26	Dimitris Kolovetsios	(Greece)	CB	Larissa, Greece	16 October 1991	(Greece) AEL	
55	Theodoris Berios	(Greece)	CB	Athens, Greece	21 March 1989	(Czech Republic) Čáslav	
Midfielders
3	Andi Lila	(Albania)	DM	Kavajë, Albania	12 February 1986	(Albania) KF Tirana	
10	Tomas De Vincenti	(Argentina)	CM	Buenos Aires, Argentina	9 February 1989	(Greece) Kalamata	
12	Evripidis Giakos	(Greece)	CM / CF	Ioannina, Greece	9 April 1991	(Greece) Doxa Kranoula	
15	Charis Charisis	(Greece)	DM / CM	Ioannina, Greece	12 January 1995	(Greece) PAS Giannina U-20	
17	Fotis Georgiou	(Greece)	RW	Arta, Greece	19 July 1985	(Greece) Diagoras	
19	Paul Keita	(Senegal)	DM	Dakar, Senegal	23 June 1992		
21	Stavros Tsoukalas	(Greece)	CM	Thessaloniki, Greece	28 May 1988	(Greece) PAOK	
23	Giorgos Niklitsiotis	(Greece)	CM	Sofades, Greece	23 March 1991	(Netherlands) Helmond Sport	
33	Nikos Korovesis	(Greece)	LW	Chalkida, Greece	10 August 1991	(Greece) Apollon Smyrni	
49	Giannis Ioannou	(Greece)	CM	Ioannina, Greece	27 May 1994	(Greece) PAS Giannina U-20	
77	Kostas Pappas	(Greece)	CM	Ioannina, Greece	30 November 1991	(Greece) Doxa Kranoula	
88	Michalis Avgenikou	(Greece)	DM / CM	Pastida, Rhodes, Greece	25 January 1993	(Greece) Diagoras	
Forwards
9	Brana Ilić	(Serbia)	CF	Golubinci, SFR Yugoslavia	16 February 1985	(Kazakhstan) FC Aktobe	
11	Emiljano Vila	(Albania)	FW	Durrës, Albania	12 March 1988	(Albania) Dinamo Tirana	
14	Giannis Nakos	(Greece)	CF	Ioannina, Greece	23 February 1993	(Greece) PAS Giannina U-20	
Left during Winter Transfer Window
28	Charis Kostakis	(Greece)	CM	Ioannina, Greece	12 July 1990	(Greece) Iraklis	
22	Christos Tzanis	(Greece)	FW	Parapotamos, Greece	22 April 1985	(Greece) Anagennisi Arta	
16	Kostas Ganotis	(Greece)	CM	Athens, Greece	14 May 1992	(Greece) Iraklis Psachna	
7	Christos Patsatzoglou	(Greece)	DM	Athens, Greece	19 March 1979	(Greece) AEK Athens	
57	Petros Topouzis	(Greece)	CF	Katerini, Greece	12 July 1991	(Greece) Tyrnavos 2005	

=== International players ===
- (Albania) Andi Lila (men's, U-21/19/17)
- (Albania) Emiljano Vila (men's, U-21/19/17)
- (Morocco) Karim Fegrouche (men's)
- (Serbia) Brana Ilić (men's)
- (Greece) Christos Patsatzoglou (men's, U-21)
- (Greece) Michalis Avgenikou (U-19)
- (Greece) Nikos Babaniotis (U-21/19)
- (Greece) Marios Oikonomou (U-21)
- (Greece) Giorgos Niklitsiotis (U-19)
- (Greece) Michalis Avgenikou (U-19)
- (Greece) Charis Kostakis (U-17)
- (Senegal) Paul Keita (U-20/17)

=== Foreign players ===
EU Nationals

EU Nationals (Dual Citizenship)
- (Albania) (Greece) (Europe) Simon Rrumbullaku

Non-EU Nationals
- (Albania) Andi Lila
- (Albania) Emiljano Vila
- (Senegal) Paul Keita
- (Serbia) Brana Ilić
- (Argentina) Tomas De Vincenti
- (Morocco) Karim Fegrouche

== Personnel ==
=== Management ===
Position	Staff
Majority Owner	Giorgos Christovasilis
President and CEO	Giorgos Christovasilis
Director of Football	Dimitris Niarchakos
Director of Office	Alekos Potsis
Head of Ticket Department	Andreas Potsis

=== Coaching staff ===
Position	Name
Head coach	Giannis Christopoulos
Assistant coach	Giannis Thomaidis
Fitness coach	Thomas Giannitopoulos (from 15 June 2012 until 9 July 2012) Leonidas Papadakis (from 9 July 2012)
Goalkeepers Coach	Kostas Paganias

=== medical staff ===
Position	Name
Head doctor	Christos Papageorgiou
Doctor	Kostantinos Patras
Physio	Filippos Skordos

=== Academy ===
Position	Name
Head of Youth Development	Christos Papageorgiou
Head coach U-20	Giannis Tatsis
Head coach U-17	Miltos Mastoras (from 19 June 2012 until 21 July 2012) Giorgos Ladias (from 21 July 2012)

== Transfers ==
=== Summer ===
==== In ====
No	Pos	Player	Transferred from	Fee	Date	Source
28	CM	Charis Kostakis	Iraklis	-	30 June 2012	
77	CM	Kostas Pappas	Doxa Kranoula	Loan return	30 June 2012	
66	GK	Apostolis Bakolas	Iraklis Psachna	-	30 June 2012	
16	CM	Kostas Ganotis	Iraklis Psachna	-	30 June 2012	
33	LW	Nikos Korovesis	Apollon Smyrni	-	30 June 2012	
88	DM	Michalis Avgenikou	Diagoras	-	30 June 2012	
26	CB	Dimitris Kolovetsios	AEL	-	5 July 2012	
89	GK	Nikos Babaniotis	Panetolikos	-	15 July 2012	
57	CF	Petros Topouzis	Tyrnavos 2005	-	22 July 2012	
20	LB	Simo Rouboulakou	Kalamata	-	22 July 2012	
23	CM	Giorgos Niklitsiotis	Helmond Sport	-	3 August 2012	
21	CM	Stavros Tsoukalas	PAOK	-	8 August 2012	
9	CF	Brana Ilić	FC Aktobe	-	8 August 2012	
55	CB	Theodoris Berios	Čáslav	-	21 August 2012	

==== Out ====
No	Pos	Player	Transferred to	Fee	Date	Source
16	DM	Paris Andralas	Panionios	-	30 June 2012	
10	FW	Ibrahima Bakayoko	Olympiacos Volos	-	30 June 2012	
18	CM	Fabrizio Zambrella	Sion	Loan termination	30 June 2012	
34	DM	Giannis Zaradoukas	Olympiacos	Loan termination	30 June 2012	
27	LB	Vanderson Scardovelli	Khazar Lankaran	-	30 June 2012	
71	GK	Fotis Kipouros	Platanias	-	30 June 2012	
7	CM	Anastasios Kyriakos	Niki Volos	-	30 June 2012	
4	CB	Ilias Kotsios	AEL Kalloni	-	30 June 2012	
11	CM	Leandro Becerra	Baku	-	30 June 2012	
26	CM	Manolis Skoufalis	Niki Volos	-	30 June 2012	

For recent transfers, see List of Greek football transfers summer 2012

=== Winter ===
==== In ====
No	Pos	Player	Transferred from	Fee	Date	Source
15	DM	Charis Charisis	PAS Giannina U-20	-	30 January 2013	
14	CF	Giannis Nakos	PAS Giannina U-20	-	30 January 2013	

==== Out ====
No	Pos	Player	Transferred to	Fee	Date	Source
28	CM	Charis Kostakis	Domžale	-	29 December 2012	
54	CF	Petros Topouzis	Anagennisi Epanomi	Loan	18 January 2013	
22	FW	Christos Tzanis	Panthrakikos	-	24 January 2013	
16	CM	Kostas Ganotis	Panionios	-	26 January 2013	
7	DM	Christos Patsatzoglou	Released	-	January 2013	

== Pre-season and friendlies ==
Win Draw Loss Upcoming fixture

17 July 2012 Friendly	PAS Giannina	3–0	Panthrakikos	Tria Pente Pigadia
18:45	Vila 28'; Tzanis 58' (pen.); Giakos 90'	Report		Stadium: unknown Attendance: unknown Referee: unknown

22 July 2012 Friendly	PAS Giannina	0–1	KF Bylis	Tria Pente Pigadia
		Report		Stadium: unknown Attendance: unknown Referee: unknown

27 July 2012 Friendly	Veria	4–0	PAS Giannina	Tria Pente Pigadia
18:00	(-); Guillermo 73'; Kolovetsios 76' (o.g.); Olaitan 83'	Report		Stadium: unknown Attendance: unknown Referee: unknown

29 July 2012 Friendly	PAS Giannina	2–0	Panionios	Tria Pente Pigadia
18:30	Kouloucheris 19' (o.g.); De Vincenti 36'	Report		Stadium: unknown Attendance: unknown Referee: Melitzanidis

3 August 2012 Friendly	PAS Giannina	1–0	Kerkyra	Ioannina
18:45	Tzanis 39'	Report		Stadium: PEAKI; Attendance: unknown Referee: unknown

7 August 2012 Friendly	PAS Giannina	4–0	PAS Giannina U-20	Ioannina
	Georgiou 6', 10', 83'; Tzanis 56'	Report		Stadium: PEAKI; Attendance: unknown Referee: unknown

8 August 2012 Friendly	PAS Giannina	3–0	Anagennisi Giannitsa	Ioannina
19:00	Avgenikou 14'; Ilić 51', 55'	Report		Stadium: PEAKI; Attendance: unknown Referee: Konstantinos Balatsoukas

10 August 2012 Friendly	Aris	0–0	PAS Giannina	Thessaloniki
19:00		Report		Stadium: Kleanthis Vikelidis Stadium; Attendance: unknown Referee: Praxitelis Zachariadis

18 August 2012 Friendly	PAS Giannina	0-0	Panetolikos	Ioannina
18:45		Report		Stadium: PEAKI; Attendance: unknown Referee: Alexandros Katsikogiannis

18 August 2012 Friendly	PAS Giannina	5-1	Kassiopi	Ioannina
18:30	Korovesis 1', 50'; Ilić 11'; Tsoukalas 73'; Niklitsiotis 88'	Report	Christos Karagiannis 71'	Stadium: PEAKI; Attendance: unknown Referee: Konstantinos Boubas

8 September 2012 Friendly	KF Luftëtari	1-0	PAS Giannina	Gjirokastër
18:00	Nora 4'	Report		Stadium: Gjirokastra Stadium; Attendance: unknown Referee: Sino

16 September 2012 Friendly	Doxa Kranoula	4-3	PAS Giannina	Ioannina
16:00	Vlachos 10'; Papavasiliou 32' (pen.); Karagiannidis 51'; Ilias 82'	Report	Oikonomou 11'; Korovesis 29'; Topouzis 70' (pen.)	Stadium: Kranoula Stadium; Attendance: unknown Referee: Siametis

2 October 2012 Friendly	Trikala	1-0	PAS Giannina	Trikala
15:30	Nikos Karaiskos 37' (pen.)	Report		Stadium: Trikala Municipal Stadium; Attendance: unknown Referee: Koutsagias

2 May 2013 Friendly	PAS Giannina	2–2	PAS Giannina U-20	Ioannina
	Nakos 10'; De Vincenti 38' (pen.)	Report	Muskaj 74' (pen.); Nikos Boukouvalas 78'	Stadium: PEAKI; Attendance: unknown Referee: unknown

2 May 2013 Friendly	PAS Preveza	1-4	PAS Giannina	Preveza
	Sideris 47'	Report	Niklitsiotis 37'; Giakos 69', 80', 84'	Stadium: Athanasia Tsoumeleka Municipal Stadium; Attendance: unknown Referee: Nikos Bailis

11 May 2013 Friendly	PAS Giannina	4–0	PAS Giannina U-20	Ioannina
	Niklitsiotis 70'; Georgiou 73'; Tsoukalas 79'; Keita 88'	Report		Stadium: PEAKI; Attendance: unknown Referee: unknown

== Competitions ==
=== League table ===
Pos	Team	Pld	W	D	L	GF	GA	GD	Pts	Qualification or relegation
3	Asteras Tripolis	30	17	5	8	41	25	+16	56	Qualification for the Play-offs
4	Atromitos	30	11	13	6	26	22	+4	46	Qualification for the Play-offs
5	PAS Giannina	30	12	8	10	28	24	+4	44	Qualification for the Play-offs
6	Panathinaikos (Note: Panathinaikos started the league season with minus 2 points because of severe crowd violence during their home match against Olympiacos last year.)	30	10	12	8	32	30	+2	40 (Note: 6th place play-off: Panathinaikos–Skoda Xanthi 3–0.)	
7	Skoda Xanthi	30	10	10	10	28	26	+2	40	Qualification for the Europa League second qualifying round

Source: Super League Greece
Rules for classification: 1) Points; 2) Head-to-head points; 3) Head-to-head goal difference.
If in current league table there are tied teams after applying criteria 1 to 3, they are considered to share places and listed in Greek language alphabetic order.
If in final league table there are still tied teams after applying criteria 1 to 3, a decision match (or matches if they are more than two) are to be played but only in three cases: to determine the champion, to fill spots in the play-off or to determine the teams to be relegated. In any other case, the final standings of tied teams are determined with a public draw

==== Results summary ====
Overall								Home						Away					
Pld	W	D	L	GF	GA	GD	Pts	W	D	L	GF	GA	GD	W	D	L	GF	GA	GD
30	12	8	10	28	24	+4	44	7	4	4	14	9	+5	5	4	6	14	15	−1

==== Fixtures ====
Win Draw Loss Upcoming fixture

25 August 2012 1	PAS Giannina	0–0	Platanias	Ioannina
19:15	Patsatzoglou (yellow card) 53'; Pantos (yellow card) 75'	Report	Udoji (yellow card) 72'; Aguilera (yellow card) 76'; Potouridis (yellow card) 88'	Stadium: Zosimades Stadium; Attendance: 956; Referee: Stavros Mantalos

31 August 2012 2	Panathinaikos	1-1	PAS Giannina	Marousi
21:30	Velázquez 28'; Seitaridis (yellow card) 49'; Katsouranis (yellow card) 52' (yellow-red card) 52'; Vitolo (yellow card) 66'; Fornaroli (yellow card) 75'	Report	Lila (yellow card) 27'; De Vincenti 45+1'; De Vincenti (yellow card) 71'; Patsatzoglou (yellow card) 90+3'	Stadium: Olympic Stadium; Attendance: 7427; Referee: Anastasios Sidiropoulos

15 September 2012 3	PAS Giannina	1-2	Olympiacos	Ioannina
19:30	Kolovetsios (yellow card) 38'; Georgiou 68'; Pantos (yellow card) 69'	Report	Modesto (yellow card) 42'; Mitroglou 60'; Djebbour 67'; Manolas (yellow card) 76'; Ibagaza (yellow card) 84'	Stadium: Zosimades Stadium; Attendance: 4052; Referee: Michail Koukoulakis

23 September 2012 4	Veria	1-0	PAS Giannina	Veria
16:00	Olaitan 65'; Bargan (yellow card) 90+4'; Olaitan (yellow card) 90+7'	Report	Lila (yellow card) 24'; Georgiou (yellow card) 35'; Vila (yellow card) 63'; Tsoukalas (yellow card) 84'	Stadium: Veria Stadium; Attendance: 1116; Referee: Alexandros Dimitropoulos

1 October 2012 5	PAS Giannina	1-0	Levadiakos	Ioannina
20:30	Lila (yellow card) 32'; Pantos (yellow card) 44'; Korovesis 54'; Dasios (yellow card) 80'; Fegrouche (yellow card) 90+3'	Report	Mendy (yellow card) 45'; Napoleoni (yellow card) 45+1'; Moulopoulos (yellow card) 45+2'; Macheras (yellow card) 75'	Stadium: Zosimades Stadium; Attendance: 673; Referee: Charalabos Kalogeropoulos

7 October 2012 6	PAS Giannina	1-2	Panionios	Ioannina
16:00	Ilić 2'	Report	Samaris (yellow card) 22'; Aravidis (yellow card) 29'; Goundoulakis 36' (pen.); Andralas (yellow card) 64'; Lampropoulos 71'; Mendrinos (yellow card) 71'	Stadium: Zosimades Stadium; Attendance: 1438; Referee: Apostolos Abarkiolis

21 October 2012 7	Panthrakikos	0-3	PAS Giannina	Komotini
18:15	Giannis Christou (yellow card) 68'	Report	Ilić 9'; Vila (yellow card) 20'; Oikonomou (yellow card) 24'; Tsoukalas 45'; Pantos (yellow card) 69'; Korovesis 73'; Keita (yellow card) 90+2'	Stadium: Komotini Municipal Stadium; Attendance: 873; Referee: Stavros Tritsonis

28 October 2012 8	PAS Giannina	0-0	Atromitos	Ioannina
17:15	Oikonomou (yellow card) 61'	Report		Stadium: Zosimades Stadium; Attendance: 1221; Referee: Georgios Daskalopoulos

4 November 2012 9	Asteras Tripolis	2-0	PAS Giannina	Tripoli
17:15	Bartolini (yellow card) 28'; Usero 41'; Sankaré (yellow card) 45+1'; Álvarez (yellow card) 64'; Perrone (yellow card) 75'; Hegon 90+4'	Report	Kolovetsios (yellow card) 17'; Lila (yellow card) 58'; Fegrouche (yellow card) 74'; Tzimopoulos (yellow card) 79'	Stadium: Theodoros Kolokotronis; Attendance: 1805; Referee: Georgios Kizas

10 November 2012 10	PAS Giannina	1-0	Xanthi	Ioannina
17:15	De Vincenti 10'; Lila (yellow card) 59'; Keita (yellow card) 79'; Pantos (yellow card) 86'	Report	Gaqollari (yellow card) 12'; Mantalos (yellow card) 22'; Markovski (yellow card) 41'; Vasilakakis (yellow card) 51'	Stadium: Zosimades Stadium; Attendance: 1249; Referee: Georgios Liachoudis

17 November 2012 11	Aris	1–2	PAS Giannina	Thessaloniki
17:15	Papasterianos (yellow card) 28'; Gianniotas 54'; Vellidis (yellow card) 68'	Report	Ilić 11'; Keita (yellow card) 14'; Psychogios 27' (o.g.); Avgenikou (yellow card) 76'; De Vincenti (yellow card) 82'	Stadium: Kleanthis Vikelidis Stadium; Attendance: 6162; Referee: Ioannis Delfakis

24 November 2012 12	PAS Giannina	1-0	OFI	Ioannina
17:15	De Vincenti 37'; Michail (yellow card) 58'; Lila (yellow card) 70'; Vila (yellow card) 79'	Report	Souza (yellow card) 22'; Verón (yellow card) 72' (yellow-red card) 82'	Stadium: Zosimades Stadium; Attendance: 2571; Referee: Stavros Tritsonis

3 December 2012 13	AEK Athens	2-1	PAS Giannina	Athens
19:30	Fountas 2'; Fountas (yellow card) 50'; Stamatis 82'; Pavlis (yellow card) 90+1'; Guerreiro (yellow card) 90+3'; Konstantopoulos (yellow card) 90+4'	Report	Michail 26'; Fegrouche (yellow card) 37'; Michail (yellow card) 57'; Lila (yellow card) 58'; De Vincenti (yellow card) 88'; Pantos (yellow card) 90+2'	Stadium: OAKA; Attendance: 5263; Referee: Dimitris Styliaras

8 December 2012 14	Kerkyra	0–2	PAS Giannina	Kerkyra
18:00	Boukouvalas (yellow card) 25'; Agelos Zouboulakis (yellow card) 44'; Éder (yellow card) 62'; Anastasopoulos (yellow card) 64'; Venetis (yellow card) 65'	Report	Lila 48'; Pantos (yellow card) 50' (yellow-red card) 56'; De Vincenti 63'; De Vincenti (yellow card) 79'	Stadium: Kerkyra Stadium; Attendance: 316; Referee: Georgios Kominis

17 December 2012 15	PAS Giannina	1-3	PAOK	Ioannina
19:30	Fegrouche (yellow card) 19'; Ilić 76'	Report	Salpingidis 20', 67'; Athanasiadis 32'; Kaçe (yellow card) 49'; Lawrence (yellow card) 54'; Vivian (yellow card) 62'; Athanasiadis (yellow card) 86'	Stadium: Zosimades Stadium; Attendance: 3241; Referee: Andreas Pappas

5 January 2013 16	Platanias	1-1	PAS Giannina	Platanias
17:15	Anastasakos 4'; Ucar (yellow card) 66'; Udoji (yellow card) 76' (yellow-red card) 92'	Report	Korovesis 20'; Pantos (yellow card) 27'; Korovesis (yellow card) 59'; Tzimopoulos (yellow card) 72'; Ilić (yellow card) 74'; Tsoukalas (yellow card) 77'	Stadium: Perivolia Municipal Stadium; Attendance: 2053; Referee: Ilias Spathas

13 January 2013 17	PAS Giannina	0-0	Panathinaikos	Ioannina
15:00	Keita (yellow card) 31'; Korovesis (yellow card) 53'	Report	Sissoko (yellow card) 14'; Sow (yellow card) 28'; Toché (yellow card) 50'; Quincy (yellow card) 55'; Pinto (yellow card) 83'	Stadium: Zosimades Stadium; Attendance: 3500; Referee: Marios Labropoulos

20 January 2013 18	Olympiacos	2-0	PAS Giannina	Piraeus
17:15	Djebbour 45+2'; Abdoun 68'	Report	Tzimopoulos (yellow card) 35'; Georgiou (yellow card) 39'	Stadium: Karaiskakis Stadium; Attendance: 20027; Referee: Georgios Daskalopoulos

27 January 2013 19	PAS Giannina	2-0	Veria	Ioannina
15:00	Lila (yellow card) 18'; Ilić 24', 53'; Tzimopoulos (yellow card) 42'; De Vincenti (yellow card) 50'	Report	Amarantidis (yellow card) 14'	Stadium: Zosimades Stadium; Attendance: 1382; Referee: Michail Voskakis

4 February 2013 20	Levadiakos	1-1	PAS Giannina	Livadeia
19:30	Moulopoulos (yellow card) 25'; Zisopoulos 66'; Lisgaras (yellow card) 90+1'	Report	Lila (yellow card) 16'; Georgiou (yellow card) 39'; Tzimopoulos 57'	Stadium: Levadia Municipal Stadium; Attendance: 867; Referee: Alexandros Aretopoulos

10 February 2013 21	Panionios	0-1	PAS Giannina	Nea Smyrni
15:00	Kampantais (red card) 13'; Kontochristos (yellow card) 55'; Toskas (yellow card) 65'	Report	Tzimopoulos (yellow card) 13' (yellow-red card) 59'; Ilić 18'; Keita (yellow card) 19'; Pantos (yellow card) 31'; Ilić (yellow card) 76'; Tabasis (yellow card) 90+2'	Stadium: Nea Smyrni Stadium; Attendance: 1686; Referee: Michail Koukoulakis

16 February 2013 22	PAS Giannina	0-0	Panthrakikos	Ioannina
17:15	Michail (yellow card) 29'; Lila (yellow card) 44'; Korovesis (yellow card) 58'; Ilić (yellow card) 79'	Report	Papadopoulos (yellow card) 29'; Diogo (yellow card) 54'; Ladakis (yellow card) 84'	Stadium: Zosimades Stadium; Attendance: 1781; Referee: Charalabos Kalogeropoulos

24 February 2013 23	Atromitos	0-0	PAS Giannina	Athens
15:00	Tavlaridis (yellow card) 69'; Skondras (yellow card) 90+4'	Report	Vila (yellow card) 32'; Michail (yellow card) 66'; Oikonomou (yellow card) 80'; Dasios (yellow card) 90+1'; Tabasis (yellow card) 90+3'	Stadium: Peristeri Stadium; Attendance: 2108; Referee: Michail Voskakis

3 March 2013 24	PAS Giannina	1-2	Asteras Tripolis	Ioannina
17:15	Korovesis 24'; Vila (yellow card) 60'	Report	Lencse 19', 48'; Pipinis (yellow card) 42'; Tsabouris (yellow card) 68'	Stadium: Zosimades Stadium; Attendance: 1864; Referee: Stavros Tritsonis

10 March 2013 25	Xanthi	0-1	PAS Giannina	Xanthi
15:00	Vasilakakis (yellow card) 30'	Report	Tsoukalas (yellow card) 21'; Tzimopoulos (yellow card) 26'; Georgiou 69'; Keita (yellow card) 81'	Stadium: Xanthi FC Arena; Attendance: 1058; Referee: Marios Labropoulos

16 March 2013 26	PAS Giannina	2-0	Aris Thessaloniki	Ioannina
17:15	Ilić 24'; Pantos (yellow card) 61'; Korovesis 64'; Lila (yellow card) 90+1'	Report	Zaradoukas (yellow card) 54'; Oikonomopoulos (yellow card) 74'	Stadium: Zosimades Stadium; Attendance: 2160; Referee: Ilias Spathas

30 March 2013 27	OFI	2–1	PAS Giannina	Heraklion
16:30	Papazoglou 17'; Papazoglou (yellow card) 18'; Lampropoulos (yellow card) 18'; Makris (yellow card) 25'; Koutsianikoulis 64'	Report	Giakos 85'	Stadium: Theodoros Vardinogiannis Stadium; Attendance: 2259; Referee: Georgios Daskalopoulos

8 April 2013 28	PAS Giannina	2-0	AEK Athens	Ioannina
19:30	Korovesis 35'; Georgiou 39'; Fegrouche (yellow card) 57'; Tzimopoulos (yellow card) 86'; Michail (yellow card) 93+3'	Report	Furtado (yellow card) 63'; Vlachos (yellow card) 78'; Petropoulos (yellow card) 88'; Guerreiro (yellow card) 90+2'	Stadium: Zosimades Stadium; Attendance: 2674; Referee: Athanasios Giachos

14 April 2013 29	PAS Giannina	1-0	Kerkyra	Ioannina
19:00	Michail (yellow card) 59'; Ilić 74'; Lila (yellow card) 81'; Vila (yellow card) 90+4'	Report	Tsoumanis (yellow card) 50'; Antonis Atanasiou (yellow card) 26'; Stamogiannos (yellow card) 62'; León (yellow card) 66'	Stadium: Zosimades Stadium; Attendance: 3548; Referee: Michail Koukoulakis

21 April 2013 30	PAOK	2-0	PAS Giannina	Thessaloniki
19:00	Glykos (yellow card) 59'; Georgiadis 68'; Fotakis (yellow card) 73'; Katsouranis 80'; Kitsiou (yellow card) 90+1'	Report	De Vincenti (yellow card) 59'; Keita (yellow card) 90+2'	Stadium: Toumba Stadium; Attendance: 9758; Referee: Stefanos Mantakis

=== UEFA play-offs ===
Pos	Team	Pld	W	D	L	GF	GA	GD	Pts	Qualification
2	PAOK	6	3	0	3	7	7	0	13	Qualification for the Champions League third qualifying round
3	Atromitos	6	3	2	1	8	5	+3	11	Qualification for the Europa League play-off round (Note: Since Asteras Tripolis lost the 2012–13 Greek Football Cup final to a team already qualified for European competitions, Olympiacos, all of the Europa League allocations were made through play-off positions.)
4	Asteras Tripolis	6	2	1	3	6	7	−1	9	Qualification for the Europa League third qualifying round
5	PAS Giannina	6	2	1	3	6	8	−2	7	

Source: Super League Greece: Standings and Schedule
Rules for classification: 1) points; 2) head-to-head points; 3) head-to-head goal difference; 4) classification of regular season

==== Fixtures ====
15 May 2013 1	PAS Giannina	2-1	Asteras Tripolis	Ioannina
17:00	Tsoukalas 8'; Georgiou (yellow card) 42'; Ilić 67'	Report	Sankaré (yellow card) 12'; Sankaré 14'; Álvarez (yellow card) 36' de Blasis (yellow card) 85'	Stadium: Zosimades Stadium; Attendance: 1378; Referee: Andreas Pappas

19 May 2013 2	PAOK	0-1	PAS Giannina	Thessaloniki
18:15	Kaçe (yellow card) 81'	Report	Rrumbullaku (yellow card) 29'; Oikonomou (yellow card) 44'; Kolovetsios (yellow card) 58'; Berios (yellow card) 72'; De Vincenti (yellow card) 88'; Lila 88'	Stadium: Toumba Stadium; Attendance: 8088; Referee: Marios Labropoulos

22 May 2013 3	PAS Giannina	1-1	Atromitos	Ioannina
17:15	De Vincenti (yellow card) 32'; Tsoukalas 34'; Keita (red card) 41'; Korovesis (yellow card) 58'; Lila (yellow card) 90+3'	Report	Karagounis 3'; Dimoutsos (yellow card) 29'; Tavlaridis (yellow card) 32'; Udoji (yellow card) 53' (yellow-red card) 56'; Fytanidis 90'; Brito 90+2'	Stadium: Zosimades Stadium; Attendance: 1706; Referee: Ilias Spathas

26 May 2013 4	Atromitos	2-0	PAS Giannina	Athens
20:30	Karagounis 17'; Tavlaridis (yellow card) 19' (yellow-red card) 90+2'; Napoleoni 46'	Report	Tzimopoulos (yellow card) 26' (yellow-red card) 90+2'	Stadium: Peristeri Stadium; Attendance: 2056; Referee: Georgios Daskalopoulos

29 May 2013 5	Asteras Tripolis	2-1	PAS Giannina	Tripoli
20:30	Caffa 6'; Tsabouris 16'; Kourbelis (yellow card) 44'; Castells (yellow card) 83'	Report	Korovesis 23' (pen.); Korovesis (yellow card) 25'; Kolovetsios (yellow card) 69'; Berios (yellow card) 72'	Stadium: Theodoros Kolokotronis; Attendance: 1822; Referee: Charalabos Kalogeropoulos

2 June 2013 6	PAS Giannina	1-2	PAOK	Ioannina
20:30	De Vincenti 31' (pen.); Keita (yellow card) 32'; De Vincenti (yellow card) 38'; Tzimopoulos (yellow card) 78'	Report	Konstantinidis (yellow card) 29'; Khumalo (yellow card) 55'; Katsouranis 70'; Schildenfeld 74'; Katsouranis (yellow card) 76'; Salpigidis (yellow card) 88'	Stadium: Zosimades Stadium; Attendance: 3381; Referee: Stavros Mantalos

=== Greek cup ===
==== Third round ====
29 November 2012 1st leg	PAS Giannina	1-0	Panserraikos	Ioannina
20:30	Giakos 22'; Keita (yellow card) 26'	Report	Kiassos (yellow card) 45+' (yellow-red card) 67'; Giorgos Paraskevaidis (yellow card) 68'; Siakkas (yellow card) 70'	Stadium: Zosimades Stadium; Referee: Marios Labropoulos

23 December 2012 2nd leg	Panserraikos	0-2	PAS Giannina	Serres
20:00	Karakostas (yellow card) 23'; Tsoutsis (yellow card) 45+1'; Karasalidis (yellow card) 68'	Report	Niklitsiotis 35'; Pantos (yellow card) 42'; Ilić 55'	Stadium: Serres Municipal Stadium; Referee: Apostolos Abarkiolis

==== Fourth round ====
10 January 2013 1st leg	PAS Giannina	2-0	Fostiras	Ioannina
17:00	Oikonomou (yellow card) 23'; Vila (yellow card) 29'; Tsoukalas 41'; De Vincenti 48'; De Vincenti (yellow card) 52'	Report	Panagiotis Boubas (yellow card) 49'; Konstantinos Pararas (yellow card) 81'	Stadium: Zosimades Stadium; Referee: Giannis Delfakis

24 January 2013 2nd leg	Fostiras	2-3	PAS Giannina	Kallithea
17:00	Panagiotis Boubas 4'; Nikos Stamos (yellow card) 32'; Panagiotis Boubas (yellow card) 51'; Antonis Vlachos 88'	Report	Giakos 8'; Lila 35'; Vila 50'	Stadium: Grigoris Lambrakis Stadium; Referee: Giannis Papadopoulos

==== Quarter-finals ====
27 February 2013 1st leg	PAS Giannina	0-1	Olympiacos	Ioannina
20:00	Lila (yellow card) 32'; Georgiou (yellow card) 37'; Vila (yellow card) 42'	Report	Abdoun 52'; Papazoglou (yellow card) 83'	Stadium: Zosimades Stadium; Referee: Giannis Topouzis

13 March 2013 2nd leg	Olympiacos	2-0	PAS Giannina	Piraeus
18:00	Maniatis 62'; Abdoun 90+3'	Report	Keita (yellow card) 22'; Avgenikou (yellow card) 38'; Kolovetsios (yellow card) 86'	Stadium: Karaiskakis Stadium; Referee: Konstantinos Ioannidis

== Statistics ==
=== Appearances ===
No.	Pos.	Nat.	Name	Greek Super League	Playoffs	Greek Cup	Total
No.	Pos.	Nat.	Name	Apps	Apps	Apps	Apps
1	GK	(Morocco)	Karim Fegrouche	23	6	1	30
2	RB	(Greece)	Georgios Dasios	16	6	5	27
3	DM	(Albania)	Andi Lila	25	4	6	35
4	CB	(Greece)	Marios Oikonomou	13	4	4	21
5	RB	(Greece)	Tasos Pantos	26	2	2	30
6	CB	(Greece)	Alexios Michail	27	5	4	36
7	DM	(Greece)	Christos Patsatzoglou	6	0	0	6
8	CB	(Greece)	Themistoklis Tzimopoulos	22	4	4	30
9	CF	(Serbia)	Brana Ilić	30	5	4	39
10	CM	(Argentina)	Tomas De Vincenti	26	4	6	36
11	FW	(Albania)	Emiljano Vila	28	5	6	39
12	CM / CF	(Greece)	Evripidis Giakos	14	2	3	19
13	GK	(Greece)	Charalambos Tabasis	6	0	4	10
14	CF	(Greece)	Giannis Nakos	0	3	0	3
15	DM / CM	(Greece)	Charis Charisis	0	1	0	1
16	CM	(Greece)	Kostas Ganotis	0	0	0	0
17	RW	(Greece)	Fotis Georgiou	30	5	3	38
19	DM	(Senegal)	Paul Keita	21	3	5	29
20	LB	(Albania) (Greece)	Simon Rrumbullaku	0	3	4	7
21	CM	(Greece)	Stavros Tsoukalas	30	6	3	39
22	FW	(Greece)	Christos Tzanis	6	0	0	6
23	CM	(Greece)	Giorgos Niklitsiotis	10	3	5	18
26	CB	(Greece)	Dimitris Kolovetsios	28	5	2	35
28	CM	(Greece)	Charis Kostakis	0	0	0	0
33	LW	(Greece)	Nikos Korovesis	26	5	1	32
49	CM	(Greece)	Giannis Ioannou	0	0	2	2
55	CB	(Greece)	Theodoris Berios	0	4	3	4
57	CF	(Greece)	Petros Topouzis	0	0	1	1
66	GK	(Greece)	Apostolos Bakolas	0	0	0	0
77	CM	(Greece)	Kostas Pappas	0	0	0	0
88	DM / CM	(Greece)	Michalis Avgenikou	5	0	4	9
89	GK	(Greece)	Nikos Babaniotis	2	0	2	4

Super League Greece

=== Goalscorers ===
No.	Pos.	Nat.	Name	Greek Super League	Playoffs	Greek Cup	Total
No.	Pos.	Nat.	Name	Goals	Goals	Goals	Goals
9	CF	(Serbia)	Brana Ilić	9	1	1	11
33	LW	(Greece)	Nikos Korovesis	6	1	0	7
10	CM	(Argentina)	Tomas De Vincenti	4	1	1	6
21	CM	(Greece)	Stavros Tsoukalas	1	2	1	4
3	DM	(Albania)	Andi Lila	1	1	1	3
17	RW	(Greece)	Fotis Georgiou	3	0	0	3
12	CM / CF	(Greece)	Evripidis Giakos	1	0	2	3
6	CB	(Greece)	Alexios Michail	1	0	0	1
8	CB	(Greece)	Themistoklis Tzimopoulos	1	0	0	1
23	CM	(Greece)	Giorgos Niklitsiotis	0	0	1	1
11	FW	(Albania)	Emiljano Vila	0	0	1	1
-	-	-	Own goals	1	0	0	1

Super League Greece

=== Clean sheets ===
No.	Pos.	Nat.	Name	Greek Super League	Playoffs	Greek Cup	Total
No.	Pos.	Nat.	Name	CS	CS	CS	CS
1	GK	(Morocco)	Karim Fegrouche	12 (23)	1 (6)	0 (1)	12 (30)
13	GK	(Greece)	Charalambos Tabasis	4 (6)	0 (0)	3 (4)	7 (10)
66	GK	(Greece)	Apostolos Bakolas	0 (0)	0 (0)	0 (0)	0 (0)
89	GK	(Greece)	Nikos Babaniotis	1 (2)	0 (0)	0 (2)	1 (4)

=== Disciplinary record ===
S	P	N	Name	Super League			Playoffs			Greek Cup			Total		
S	P	N	Name	Yellow card	Yellow-red card	Red card	Yellow card	Yellow-red card	Red card	Yellow card	Yellow-red card	Red card	Yellow card	Yellow-red card	Red card
1	GK	(Morocco)	Karim Fegrouche	5	0	0	0	0	0	0	0	0	5	0	0
2	RB	(Greece)	Georgios Dasios	2	0	0	0	0	0	0	0	0	2	0	0
3	DM	(Albania)	Andi Lila	12	0	0	1	0	0	1	0	0	14	0	0
4	CB	(Greece)	Marios Oikonomou	3	0	0	1	0	0	1	0	0	5	0	0
5	RB	(Greece)	Tasos Pantos	9	1	0	0	0	0	1	0	0	10	1	0
6	CB	(Greece)	Alexios Michail	6	0	0	0	0	0	0	0	0	6	0	0
7	DM	(Greece)	Christos Patsatzoglou	2	0	0	0	0	0	0	0	0	2	0	0
8	CB	(Greece)	Themistoklis Tzimopoulos	6	1	0	1	1	0	0	0	0	7	2	0
9	CF	(Serbia)	Brana Ilić	3	0	0	0	0	0	0	0	0	3	0	0
10	CM	(Argentina)	Tomas De Vincenti	6	0	0	3	0	0	1	0	0	10	0	0
11	FW	(Albania)	Emiljano Vila	6	0	0	0	0	0	2	0	0	8	0	0
13	GK	(Greece)	Charalambos Tabasis	2	0	0	0	0	0	0	0	0	2	0	0
17	RW	(Greece)	Fotis Georgiou	3	0	0	1	0	0	1	0	0	5	0	0
19	DM	(Senegal)	Paul Keita	7	0	0	1	0	1	2	0	0	10	0	1
20	LB	(Albania) (Greece)	Simon Rrumbullaku	0	0	0	1	0	0	0	0	0	1	0	0
21	CM	(Greece)	Stavros Tsoukalas	3	0	0	0	0	0	0	0	0	3	0	0
26	CB	(Greece)	Dimitris Kolovetsios	2	0	0	2	0	0	1	0	0	5	0	0
33	LW	(Greece)	Nikos Korovesis	3	0	0	2	0	0	0	0	0	5	0	0
55	CB	(Greece)	Theodoris Berios	0	0	0	2	0	0	0	0	0	2	0	0
88	DM / CM	(Greece)	Michalis Avgenikou	1	0	0	0	0	0	1	0	0	2	0	0

=== Awards ===
Best Manager in Greece:Giannis Christopoulos
