= 2013–14 PAS Giannina F.C. season =

PAS Giannina
2013–14 season
- Chairman: Giorgos Christovasilis
- Manager: Savvas Pantelidis (until 31 October 2013); Giorgos Georgoulopoulos (caretaker, from 31 October 2013 until 5 November 2013); Sakis Tsiolis (from 5 November 2013 until 22 January 2014); Giorgos Georgoulopoulos (caretaker, from 23 January 2014 until 28 January 2014); Giannis Petrakis (from 28 January 2014)
- Stadium: Zosimades Stadium, Ioannina
- Super League: 11th
- Greek Cup: Second Round, eliminated by Aiginiakos
- Top goalscorer: League: Ilic, De Vicenti; 5 goals All: Ilic, De Vicenti; 5 goals
- Highest home attendance: 4122; Panathinaikos
- Lowest home attendance: 1223; Panthrakikos
- Average home league attendance: 2070
Home colours	Away colours	Third colours

The 2013–14 season is PAS Giannina F.C.'s 19th competitive season in the top flight of Greek football, 4th season in the Super League Greece, and 48th year in existence as a football club. They also compete in the Greek Cup.

== Players ==
Updated:-

No.	Name	Nationality	Position(s)	Place of birth	Date of birth	Signed from	Notes
Goalkeepers
1	Markos Vellidis	(Greece)	GK	Kastoria, Greece	4 April 1987	(Greece) Aris	
40	Giorgos Abaris	(Greece)	GK	Naousa, Greece	23 April 1982	(Romania) Universitatea Cluj	
77	Dimitris Sotiriou	(Greece)	GK	Martino, Boeotia, Greece	13 September 1987	(Cyprus) Ermis Aradippou	
Defenders
2	Georgios Dasios (C)	(Greece)	RB	Ioannina, Greece	12 May 1983	-	
4	Thodoris Berios	(Greece)	CB	Athens, Greece	21 March 1989	(Czech Republic) Čáslav	
5	Leandro Climaco Pinto	(Brazil)	CB	São Paulo, Brazil	24 January 1994	(Greece) AEL Kalloni	Loan
6	Alexios Michail (VC)	(Greece)	CB	Ioannina, Greece	18 August 1986	(Greece) Panserraikos	
8	Themistoklis Tzimopoulos (VC2)	(Greece)	CB	Kozani, Greece	20 November 1985	(Greece) Ethnikos Asteras	
17	Arben Muskaj	(Albania)	RB	Patos, Albania	27 June 1994	(Greece) PAS Giannina U20	
23	Andraž Struna	(Slovenia)	RB	Piran, SFR Yugoslavia	23 April 1989	(Poland) Cracovia	
26	Dimitrios Kolovetsios	(Greece)	CB	Larissa, Greece	16 October 1991	(Greece) AEL	
44	Apostolos Skondras	(Greece)	CB	Athens, Greece	29 December 1988	(Greece) AEL	
Midfielders
3	Andi Lila (VC3)	(Albania)	DM	Kavajë, Albania	12 February 1986	(Albania) KF Tirana	
7	Evripidis Giakos	(Greece)	CM / CF	Ioannina, Greece	9 April 1991	(Greece) Doxa Kranoula	
10	Cristian Gabriel Chávez	(Argentina)	CM	Lomas de Zamora, Argentina	4 June 1987	(Argentina) Almirante Brown	
15	Charis Charisis	(Greece)	DM / CM	Ioannina, Greece	12 January 1995	(Greece) PAS Giannina U20	
18	Michalis Avgenikou	(Greece)	DM / CM	Pastida, Rhodes, Greece	25 January 1993	(Greece) Diagoras	
21	Stavros Tsoukalas	(Greece)	CM	Thessaloniki, Greece	28 May 1988	(Greece) PAOK	
22	Noé Acosta	(Spain)	CM / LW	Guadalajara, Castilla-La Mancha, Spain	10 December 1983	(Greece) Olympiacos Volos	
33	Nikos Korovesis	(Greece)	LW	Chalkida, Greece	10 August 1991	(Greece) Apollon Smyrnis	
49	Giannis Ioannou	(Greece)	CM	Ioannina, Greece	27 May 1994	(Greece) PAS Giannina U-20	
96	Kostas Kamperis	(Greece)	CM	Larissa, Greece	10 July 1996	(Greece) Machitis Terpsithea	
99	Franck Songo'o	(Cameroon)	W	Yaoundé, Cameroon	14 May 1987	(Greece) Glyfada	
91	Aurelian Chițu	(Romania)	MF	Țăndărei, Romania	25 March 1991	(France) Valenciennes	
Forwards
9	Brana Ilić	(Serbia)	CF	Golubinci, SFR Yugoslavia	16 February 1985	(Kazakhstan) FC Aktobe	
11	Emiljano Vila	(Albania)	FW	Durrës, Albania	12 March 1988	(Albania) Dinamo Tirana	
12	Leonidas Kyvelidis	(Greece)	CF	Jambyl, Kazakhstan	8 February 1986	(Greece) Kassiopi	
14	Giannis Nakos	(Greece)	CF	Ioannina, Greece	23 February 1993	(Greece) PAS Giannina U20	
25	Tasos Kritikos	(Greece)	CF	Larissa, Greece	25 January 1995	(Greece) AEL	
Left during Winter Transfer Window
5	Paul Keita	(Senegal)	DM	Dakar, Senegal	23 June 1992		
19	Tomas De Vincenti	(Argentina)	CM	Buenos Aires, Argentina	9 February 1989	(Greece) Olympiakos	Loan
36	Charlton Vicento	(Netherlands)	LW	Zoetermeer, Netherlands	19 January 1991	(Netherlands) ADO Den Haag	
20	Simon Rrumbullaku	(Albania) (Greece)	LB	Rafina, Greece	30 December 1991	(Greece) Kalamata	

=== International players ===
- (Albania) Andi Lila (men's, U-21/19/17)
- (Albania) Emiljano Vila (men's, U-21/19/17)
- (Greece) Georgios Abaris
- (Slovenia) Andraž Struna (men's, U-21/20)
- (Serbia) Brana Ilić
- (Greece) Michalis Avgenikou (U-19)
- (Greece) Tasos Kritikos (U-19)
- (Albania) Arben Muskaj (U-21/20/19/17)
- (Senegal) Paul Keita (U-20/17)
- (Netherlands) Charlton Vicento U-21/20/19)
- (Greece) Leonidas Kyvelidis (U-21)
- (Cameroon) (France) Franck Songo'o (men's, U-23/U-19)
- (Romania) Aurelian Chițu (men's, U-21/19)

=== Foreign players ===
EU Nationals
- (Slovenia) (Europe) Andraž Struna
- (Netherlands) (Europe) Charlton Vicento
- (Spain) (Europe) Noé Acosta
- (Romania) (Europe) Aurelian Chițu

EU Nationals (Dual Citizenship)
- (Albania) (Greece) (Europe) Simon Rrumbullaku
- (Cameroon) (France) (Europe) Franck Songo'o

Non-EU Nationals
- (Albania) Andi Lila
- (Albania) Arben Muskaj
- (Albania) Emiljano Vila
- (Senegal) Paul Keita
- (Serbia) Brana Ilić
- (Argentina) Cristian Chávez
- (Argentina) Tomas De Vincenti
- (Brazil) Leandro Climaco Pinto

== Personnel ==
=== Management ===
Position	Staff
Majority Owner	Giorgos Christovasilis
President and CEO	Giorgos Christovasilis
Vice President	Christos Papageorgiou
Director of Football	Dimitris Niarchakos
Director of Office	Alekos Potsis
Head of Ticket Department	Andreas Potsis
Head of Youth Department	Christos Papageorgiou

=== Coaching staff ===
Position	Name
Head coach	Savvas Pantelidis (from 24 June 2013 until 31 October 2013) Giorgos Georgoulopoulos ct (from 31 October 2013 until 5 November 2013) Sakis Tsiolis (from 5 November 2013 until 22 January 2014) Giorgos Georgoulopoulos ct (from 23 January 2014 until 28 January 2014) Giannis Petrakis (from 28 January 2014)
Assistant coach	Giorgos Georgoulopoulos (from 25 June 2013) Lazaros Kirilidis (from 5 November 2013 until 23 January 2014) Vagelis Tsiolis (from 5 November 2013 until 23 January 2014)
Fitness coach	Christos Papaioannou (from 29 June 2013 until 17 September 2013) Vasilis Segos (from 18 September 2013 until 7 November 2013) Kosmas Stratos (from 5 November 2013 until 23 January 2014) Vasilis Alexiou (from 28 January 2014)
Goalkeepers Coach	Christos Tseliopoulos (from 25 June 2013)
Analyst	Vagelis Tsiolis (from 5 November 2013 until 23 January 2014)

=== medical staff ===
Position	Name
Head doctor	
ergophysiologist	Konstantinos Patras
Physio	Filippos Skordos

=== Scouting ===
Position	Name
Scouter	Vagelis Tsiolis (from 5 November 2013 until 23 January 2014)

=== Academy ===
Position	Name
Head of Youth Development	
Head coach U-20	Giannis Tatsis
Head coach U-17	Giorgos Ladias

== Transfers ==
=== Summer ===
==== In ====
No	Pos	Player	Transferred from	Fee	Date	Source
1	GK	Markos Vellidis	Aris	-	13 June 2013	
77	GK	Dimitris Sotiriou	Ermis Aradippou	-	15 June 2013	
57	CF	Petros Topouzis	Anagennisi Epanomi	Loan Return	26 June 2013	
17	RB	Arben Muskaj	PAS Giannina U-20	-	29 June 2013	
36	LW	Charlton Vicento	ADO Den Haag	-	29 June 2013	
10	CM	Cristian Gabriel Chávez	Napoli	-	22 July 2013	
40	GK	Giorgos Abaris	Universitatea Cluj	-	25 July 2013	
44	CB	Apostolos Skondras	AEL	-	26 July 2013	
25	CF	Tasos Kritikos	AEL	-	27 July 2013	
23	RB	Andraž Struna	Cracovia	-	19 August 2013	
19	CM	Tomas De Vincenti	Olympiakos	Loan	2 September 2013	

==== Out ====
No	Pos	Player	Transferred to	Fee	Date	Source
13	GK	Charalambos Tabasis	Retired	-	9 June 2013	
23	CM	Giorgos Niklitsiotis	-	-	14 June 2013	
4	CB	Marios Oikonomou	Cagliari	600.000	17 June 2013	
17	RW	Fotis Georgiou	Atromitos	-	17 June 2013	
1	GK	Karim Fegrouche	AEL Limassol	-	19 June 2013	
77	CM	Kostas Pappas		-	21 June 2013	
89	GK	Nikos Babaniotis	Ionikos	-	26 June 2013	
66	GK	Apostolis Bakolas		-	26 June 2013	
-		Agelos Nasios		-	26 June 2013	
-		Kostas Nasoulis		-	26 June 2013	
-		Gerald Geka		-	26 June 2013	
-		Nikos Bagias		-	26 June 2013	
5	RB	Tasos Pantos	Retired	-	29 June 2013	
10	CM	Tomas De Vincenti	Olympiakos	-	1 July 2013	
57	CF	Petros Topouzis	A.O Pefki F.C.	-	2 August 2013	

For recent transfers, see

=== Winter ===
==== In ====
No	Pos	Player	Transferred from	Fee	Date	Source
12	CF	Leonidas Kyvelidis	Kassiopi	-	22 December 2013	
22	CM	Noé Acosta	Olympiacos Volos	-	31 December 2013	
99	MF	Franck Songo'o	Glyfada	-	31 December 2013	
91	MF	Aurelian Chițu	Valenciennes	Loan	30 January 2014	
96	CM	Kostas Kamperis	Machitis Terpsithea	-	31 January 2014	
5	CB	Leandro Climaco Pinto	AEL Kalloni	Loan	31 January 2014	

==== Out ====
No	Pos	Player	Transferred to	Fee	Date	Source
5	DM	Paul Keita	AEL Kalloni	-	24 December 2013	
19	CM	Tomas De Vincenti	APOEL	Loan termination	3 January 2014	
36	LW	Charlton Vicento	Willem II	-	24 January 2014	
20	LB	Simon Rrumbullaku	-	-	13 March 2014	

== Pre-season and friendlies ==
Win Draw Loss Upcoming fixture

12 July 2013 Friendly	PAS Giannina	2–0	Asteras Tripolis	Karpenisi
18:30	Vila 52'; Lila 87'	Report		Stadium: Athletic center of Karpenisi; Attendance: unknown Referee: Christos Tsabras

15 July 2013 Friendly	PAS Giannina	2–1	Platanias	Karpenisi
18:00	Michail 11'; Avgenikou 85'	Report	Giakoumakis 63'	Stadium: Hotel Avaris Field; Attendance: unknown Referee: Nektarios Chrisafopoulos

27 July 2013 Friendly	PAS Giannina	2–1	Veria	Ioannina
19:00	Lila 43'; Kritikos 69'	Report	Manos 93'	Stadium: Zosimades Stadium; Attendance: unknown Referee: Alexandros Katsikogiannis

31 July 2013 Friendly	Aris	2–0	PAS Giannina	Thessaloniki
20:00	Manias 25'; Kolovetsios 69' (o.g.)	Report		Stadium: Kleanthis Vikelidis Stadium; Attendance: unknown Referee: Antonis Valiotis

7 August 2013 Friendly	Panetolikos	3–1	PAS Giannina	Agrinio
19:00	Bojović 12'; Bellón 16'; Camara 53' (pen.)	Report	Chávez 54'	Stadium: Panetolikos Stadium; Attendance: unknown Referee: unknown

7 September 2013 Friendly	Kassiopi	1–1	PAS Giannina	Kerkyra
18:00	Baldovaliev 76'	Report	De Vincenti 78'	Stadium: Kerkyra Stadium; Attendance: unknown Referee: Nikos Poulimas

25 April 2014 Friendly	PAS Giannina	1–0	Veria	Ioannina
17:30	Korovesis 74'	Report		Stadium: PEAKI; Attendance: unknown Referee: Giorgos Tasis

30 April 2014 Friendly	Veria	1-1	PAS Giannina	Veria
17:30	Bargan 7'	Report	Ilić 45+'	Stadium: Veria Stadium; Attendance: unknown Referee: unknown

== Competitions ==
=== League table ===
Pos	Team	Pld	W	D	L	GF	GA	GD	Pts
9	Levadiakos	34	13	3	18	42	61	−19	42 (Note: Head-to-head points (goal difference): Levadiakos 3 (0), Panetolikos 3 (0).)
10	Panthrakikos	34	11	8	15	39	52	−13	41 (Note: Head-to-head points: Panthrakikos 4, PAS Giannina 1.)
11	PAS Giannina	34	12	5	17	34	43	−9	41
12	AEL Kalloni	34	12	3	19	31	62	−31	39 (Note: Head-to-head points: AEL Kalloni 4, Panionios 1.)
13	Panionios	34	10	9	15	33	42	−9	39

Source: Super League Greece
Rules for classification: 1) Points; 2) Head-to-head points; 3) Head-to-head goal difference; 4) Goals scored; 5) Goals against; 6) Play-offs (neutral ground).
(Note: Criteria 6 is only used if needed to decide champion, teams for relegation or teams for UEFA competitions).
If in final league table there are still tied teams after applying criteria 1 to 5, a decision match (or matches if they are more than two) are to be played but only in three cases: to determine the champion, to fill spots in the play-off or to determine the teams to be relegated. In any other case, the final standings of tied teams are determined with a public draw.

==== ====
Overall								Home						Away					
Pld	W	D	L	GF	GA	GD	Pts	W	D	L	GF	GA	GD	W	D	L	GF	GA	GD
34	12	5	17	34	43	−9	41	10	1	6	19	14	+5	2	4	11	15	29	−14

==== Fixtures ====
Win Draw Loss Upcoming fixture

18 August 2013 1	Asteras Tripolis	3-3	PAS Giannina	Tripoli
19:15	Tsabouris (yellow card) 10'; Usero 13' (pen.); Blasis 32'; Caffa (yellow card) 80'; Carrasco 87'	Report	Tsoukalas 11' (pen.); Vellidis (yellow card) 12'; Chávez 28'; Vila 57'	Stadium: Theodoros Kolokotronis; Attendance: 2455; Referee: Georgios Liachoudis

25 August 2013 2	PAS Giannina	2-0	Apollon Smyrnis	Ioannina
19:15	Lila (yellow card) 8'; Chávez 23'; Ilić 43'	Report		Stadium: Zosimades Stadium; Attendance: 1822; Referee: Marios Labropoulos

31 August 2013 3	AEL Kalloni	1–0	PAS Giannina	Marousi
19:15	Leozinho 53'; Giorgos Chorianopoulos (yellow card) 90+3'	Report	Ilić (yellow card) 50'; Kolovetsios (yellow card) 84'	Stadium: Olympic Stadium; Attendance: 878; Referee: Stefanos Mantakis

16 September 2013 4	PAS Giannina	1-0	Atromitos	Ioannina
19:30	Dasios (yellow card) 52'; Tsoukalas 67'; Kritikos (yellow card) 90+4'	Report	Fytanidis (yellow card) 45'; Karagounis (yellow card) 75'	Stadium: Zosimades Stadium; Attendance: 1864; Referee: Ioannis Kabaxis

22 September 2013 5	Levadiakos	1-0	PAS Giannina	Livadeia
18:15	Lambropoulos 11'; Martínez (yellow card) 64'; Lykogiannis (yellow card) 77'	Report	De Vincenti (yellow card) 42'; Korovesis (yellow card) 71'	Stadium: Levadia Municipal Stadium; Attendance: 733; Referee: Apostolos Abarkiolis

29 September 2013 6	PAS Giannina	2-1	Xanthi	Ioannina
18:15	Korovesis 6'; Lila (yellow card) 36'; De Vincenti (yellow card) 53'; Korovesis (yellow card) 56'; Kolovetsios 77'; Chávez (yellow card) 86'	Report	Guzman (yellow card) 10'; Vallas (red card) 45+1'; Ranos 10'; Mantalos (yellow card) 88'	Stadium: Zosimades Stadium; Attendance: 1733; Referee: Stavros Tritsonis

7 October 2013 7	Panetolikos	2-0	PAS Giannina	Agrinio
19:30	Galo 32'; Camara 46'	Report	Michail (yellow card) 31'; Kolovetsios (yellow card) 71'	Stadium: Panetolikos Stadium; Attendance: 2487; Referee: Anastasios Papapetrou

21 October 2013 8	PAS Giannina	0-1	Panionios	Ioannina
19:30	Vellidis (yellow card) 89'	Report	Kouloucheris (yellow card) 7'; Dounis 37'; Nikos Kaltsas (yellow card) 62'; Aravidis (yellow card) 90+3'	Stadium: Zosimades Stadium; Attendance: 1815; Referee: Charalabos Kalogeropoulos

27 October 2013 9	Veria	2-2	PAS Giannina	Veria
17:15	Mrdaković (yellow card) 19'; Kaltsas 32'; Bargan 39'; Manos (yellow card) 90+4'	Report	Ilić 5'; Korovesis (yellow card) 15'; Korovesis 29'; Tzimopoulos (yellow card) 33'; Michail (yellow card) 44'; Lila (yellow card) 48' (yellow-red card) 69'; Dasios (yellow card) 87'	Stadium: Veria Stadium; Attendance: 1775; Referee: Stavros Mantalos

2 November 2013 10	PAS Giannina	1–0	Platanias	Ioannina
15:00	Lila (yellow card) 35'; De Vincenti (yellow card) 41'; Dasios (yellow card) 61'; Vila 62'	Report	Tetteh (yellow card) 43'; Angelos Zouboulakis (yellow card) 57'; Fernandes (yellow card) 74'; Emídio (yellow card) 89'	Stadium: Zosimades Stadium; Attendance: 1546; Referee: Athanasios Giachos

9 November 2013 11	PAS Giannina	2-1	OFI	Ioannina
17:15	Tzimopoulos (yellow card) 29'; De Vincenti 63'; De Vincenti (yellow card) 64'; Tsoukalas 73'; Lila (yellow card) 77'	Report	Fragoulakis (yellow card) 33'; Tripotseris (yellow card) 61'; Daskalakis (yellow card) 74'; Makris (yellow card) 78'; Makukula 83'	Stadium: Zosimades Stadium; Attendance: 2909; Referee: Giorgos Kizas

24 November 2013 12	Panathinaikos	3-1	PAS Giannina	Athens
15:00	Marcus Berg 32'; Schildenfeld (yellow card) 60'; Mendes (yellow card) 69'; Zeca (yellow card) 82'; Nikolaos Karelis 83', 90+1'	Report	De Vincenti 51'; De Vincenti (yellow card) 60'	Stadium: Leoforos Stadium; Attendance: CD; Referee: Georgios Liahoudis

2 December 2013 13	PAS Giannina	0-2	PAOK	Ioannina
19:30	Kolovetsios (yellow card) 18'; Korovesis (yellow card) 25'; Lila (yellow card) 47'; Berios (red card) 82'	Report	Katsouranis (yellow card) 23'; Ninis (yellow card) 37'; Tzavellas (yellow card) 54'; Spyropoulos (yellow card) 70'; Lucas 83' (pen.); Lazăr 87'	Stadium: Zosimades Stadium; Attendance: 2899; Referee: Ilias Spathas

8 December 2013 14	Panthrakikos	2-0	PAS Giannina	Komotini
17:15	Igor 30' (pen.); Zequinha 54'	Report	Keita (yellow card) 20' (yellow-red card) 64'; Lila (red card) 29'; Vellidis (yellow card) 30'	Stadium: Komotini Municipal Stadium; Attendance: 1429; Referee: Apostolos Abarkiolis

14 December 2013 15	PAS Giannina	2-0	Ergotelis	Ioannina
17:15	De Vincenti 11' (pen.), 51'; Tzimopoulos (yellow card) 11'; De Vincenti (yellow card) 59'	Report	Sarris (yellow card) 10'; Pelé (yellow card) 38'; Romano (yellow card) 90+1'	Stadium: Zosimades Stadium; Attendance: 1566; Referee: Ioannis Delfakis

18 December 2013 16	Olympiacos	3-2	PAS Giannina	Piraeus
19:30	Saviola 21'; Machado 51' (pen.); Campbell 70' (pen.)	Report	Rrumbullaku (yellow card) 10' (yellow-red card) 70'; Ilić 11'; Tsoukalas (yellow card) 40'; Kritikos 87'	Stadium: Karaiskakis Stadium; Attendance: 15453; Referee: Alexandros Aretopoulos

23 December 2013 17	PAS Giannina	2-1	Aris Thessaloniki	Ioannina
19:30	De Vincenti (yellow card) 23'; Dasios (red card) 44'; De Vincenti 51' (pen.); Lila 73'	Report	Tatos (red card) 44'; Aganzo (yellow card) 45'; Papadopoulos (yellow card) 50'; Iraklis (yellow card) 50'; Manias 56'; Dioudis (yellow card) 90+4'	Stadium: Zosimades Stadium; Attendance: 1999; Referee: Anastasios Sidiropoulos

4 January 2014 18	PAS Giannina	0-2	Asteras Tripolis	Ioannina
15:00	Berios (yellow card) 13'; Lila (yellow card) 24'; Kyvelidis (yellow card) 54'; Michail (yellow card) 74'	Report	Barrales 14'; Goian (yellow card) 15'; Carrasco 39'; Usero (yellow card) 42'; Guirane (yellow card) 90'	Stadium: Zosimades Stadium; Attendance: 2007; Referee: Michail Koukoulakis

12 January 2014 19	Apollon Smyrnis	4-0	PAS Giannina	Athens
17:15	Christos Mingas 45+2', 60'; Dahlberg 49'; Farinola 70'	Report	Tzimopoulos (yellow card) 26'	Stadium: Georgios Kamaras Stadium; Attendance: 1336; Referee: Anastasios Kakos

19 January 2014 20	PAS Giannina	1-2	AEL Kalloni	Ioannina
17:15	Acosta 10'; Kyvelidis (yellow card) 11'; Lila (yellow card) 24'; Acosta (yellow card) 63'; Tsoukalas (yellow card) 70'	Report	Zakuani (yellow card) 32'; Keita (yellow card) 43'; Leozinho 67'; Podaný (yellow card) 73'; Perrone 78'; Perrone (yellow card) 80'; Faria (yellow card) 86'	Stadium: Zosimades Stadium; Attendance: 1518; Referee: Charalabos Kalogeropoulos

25 January 2014 21	Atromitos	1-0	PAS Giannina	Athens
17:15	Papadopoulos 33'; Napoleoni (yellow card) 53'; Dimoutsos (yellow card) 88'	Report	Korovesis (yellow card) 90+3'	Stadium: Peristeri Stadium; Attendance: 1391; Referee: Georgios Daskalopoulos

1 February 2014 22	PAS Giannina	2-1	Levadiakos	Ioannina
15:00	Ilić 24'; Acosta (yellow card) 25'; Tsoukalas (yellow card) 31'; Tsoukalas 36'; Dasios (yellow card) 76'; Vellidis (yellow card) 90+4'	Report	Martins (yellow card) 43'; Mantzios 73'; Mantzios (yellow card) 90'	Stadium: Zosimades Stadium; Attendance: 1562; Referee: Athanasios Giachos

5 February 2014 23	Xanthi	0-3	PAS Giannina	Xanthi
15:00		Report	Tzimopoulos 7'; Korovesis 31'; Tzimopoulos (yellow card) 51'; Berios (yellow card) 54'; Ilić 58'	Stadium: Xanthi FC Arena; Attendance: 857; Referee: Anastasios Papapetrou

9 February 2014 24	PAS Giannina	1-0	Panetolikos	Ioannina
17:15	Lila (yellow card) 43'; Chițu 90+4'	Report	Dalmat (yellow card) 45'; Sfakianakis (yellow card) 90+4'	Stadium: Zosimades Stadium; Attendance: 2136; Referee: Michail Voskakis

16 February 2014 25	Panionios	2-0	PAS Giannina	Nea Smyrni
17:15	Kolovos 22'; Mitropoulos (yellow card) 61'; Dounis 77'; Stavrothanasopoulos (yellow card) 79'	Report	Lila (yellow card) 45'; Tzimopoulos (yellow card) 64' (yellow-red card) 85'; Korovesis (yellow card) 78'	Stadium: Nea Smyrni Stadium; Attendance: 1387; Referee: Georgios Liachoudis

23 February 2014 26	PAS Giannina	0-1	Veria	Ioannina
17:15	Michail (yellow card) 81'; Berios (yellow card) 90+3'	Report	Georgiadis (yellow card) 56'; Amarantidis (yellow card) 57'; Vertzos (yellow card) 60'; Bargan (yellow card) 74'; Ben 90+1'	Stadium: Zosimades Stadium; Attendance: 1687; Referee: Georgios Daskalopoulos

3 March 2014 27	Platanias	1-2	PAS Giannina	Platanias
19:30	Katai 23'; Aguilera (yellow card) 24'; Yahia (yellow card) 27'	Report	Berios 11'; Michail (yellow card) 36'; Dasios (yellow card) 44'; Ilić (yellow card) 50'; Kolovetsios 61'; Tzimopoulos (yellow card) 78'	Stadium: Perivolia Municipal Stadium; Attendance: 1544; Referee: Stavros Tritsonis

8 March 2014 28	OFI	1–1	PAS Giannina	Heraklion
15:00	Milhazes (yellow card) 65'; Banousis (yellow card) 75'; Núñez 85'	Report	Acosta (yellow card) 53'; Ilić (yellow card) 66'; Chávez 90+2'; Chávez (yellow card) 90+2'	Stadium: Theodoros Vardinogiannis Stadium; Attendance: 3580; Referee: Alexandros Aretopoulos

16 March 2014 29	PAS Giannina	0-1	Panathinaikos	Ioannina
15:00	Acosta (yellow card) 80'	Report	Triantafyllopoulos (yellow card) 23'; Ajagun 36'; Lagos (yellow card) 39'; Mendes (yellow card) 67'	Stadium: Zosimades Stadium; Attendance: 4122; Referee: Athanasios Giachos

23 March 2014 30	PAOK	2-1	PAS Giannina	Thessaloniki
15:00	Vukić (yellow card) 21'; Athanasiadis (yellow card) 26'; Kitsiou (yellow card) 30'; Tzavellas (yellow card) 30'; Vítor (red card) 32'; Stoch 66'; Lucas 82'; Lucas (yellow card) 85'	Report	Korovesis (yellow card) 32'; Dasios (yellow card) 37'; Lila 63'; Struna (yellow card) 64'; Vellidis (yellow card) 70'; Acosta (yellow card) 75'	Stadium: Toumba Stadium; Attendance: 11494; Referee: Michail Voskakis

27 March 2014 31	PAS Giannina	1-1	Panthrakikos	Ioannina
17:15	Lila (yellow card) 8'; Tzimopoulos 38'	Report	Igor 26'; Baykara (yellow card) 38'; Giannis Christou (yellow card) 60'; Romeu (yellow card) 61'; Papageorgiou (yellow card) 77'	Stadium: Zosimades Stadium; Attendance: 1223; Referee: Marios Labropoulos

30 March 2014 32	Ergotelis	1-0	PAS Giannina	Heraklion
17:15	Cardozo (yellow card) 57'; Chanti 72'; Kubík (yellow card) 87'; Aziz (yellow card) 90+3'	Report	Tzimopoulos (yellow card) 54' (yellow-red card) 71'; Kolovetsios (yellow card) 90+2'	Stadium: Pankritio Stadium; Attendance: 1290; Referee: Alexandros Aretopoulos

6 April 2014 33	PAS Giannina	2-0	Olympiacos	Ioannina
19:00	Michail 1'; Vila 14'; Avgenikou (yellow card) 75'	Report	Torres (yellow card) 45+1'	Stadium: Zosimades Stadium; Attendance: 2789; Referee: Anastasios Papapetrou

13 April 2014 34	Aris Thessaloniki	0-0	PAS Giannina	Thessaloniki
19:00	Vlachos (yellow card) 87'	Report	Berios (yellow card) 35'	Stadium: Kleanthis Vikelidis Stadium; Attendance: 3336; Referee: Apostolos Abarkiolis

=== Greek cup ===
==== Second round ====
25 September 2013 1st leg	PAS Giannina	0-0	Aiginiakos	Ioannina
15:30	Rrumbullaku (yellow card) 9'; Korovesis (yellow card) 43'	Report		Stadium: Zosimades Stadium; Referee: Fotis Fotiadis

30 October 2013 2nd leg	Aiginiakos	1-0	PAS Giannina	Aiginio
15:00	Churlinov 24'	Report	Berios (yellow card) 61'; De Vincenti (yellow card) 80'; Avgenikou (yellow card) 88'	Stadium: Aiginio Municipal Stadium; Referee: Ioannis Papadopoulos

== Statistics ==
=== Appearances ===
No.	Pos.	Nat.	Name	Greek Super League	Greek Cup	Total
No.	Pos.	Nat.	Name	Apps	Apps	Apps
1	GK	(Greece)	Markos Vellidis	32	0	32
2	RB	(Greece)	Georgios Dasios	28	1	29
3	DM	(Albania)	Andi Lila	26	0	26
4	CB	(Greece)	Thodoris Berios	22	2	24
5	CB	(Brazil)	Leandro Climaco Pinto	2	0	2
5	DM	(Senegal)	Paul Keita	9	2	11
6	CB	(Greece)	Alexios Michail	27	0	27
7	CM / CF	(Greece)	Evripidis Giakos	16	1	17
8	CB	(Greece)	Themistoklis Tzimopoulos	27	0	27
9	CF	(Serbia)	Brana Ilić	34	2	36
10	CM	(Argentina)	Cristian Gabriel Chávez	18	1	19
11	FW	(Albania)	Emiljano Vila	29	2	31
12	CF	(Greece)	Leonidas Kyvelidis	4	0	4
14	CF	(Greece)	Giannis Nakos	2	0	2
15	DM / CM	(Greece)	Charis Charisis	3	0	3
17	RB	(Albania)	Arben Muskaj	0	0	0
18	DM / CM	(Greece)	Michalis Avgenikou	6	2	8
19	CM	(Argentina)	Tomas De Vincenti	10	1	11
20	LB	(Albania) (Greece)	Simon Rrumbullaku	5	1	6
21	CM	(Greece)	Stavros Tsoukalas	34	2	36
22	CM / LW	(Spain)	Noé Acosta	15	0	15
23	RB	(Slovenia)	Andraž Struna	30	2	32
25	CF	(Greece)	Tasos Kritikos	14	1	15
26	CB	(Greece)	Dimitrios Kolovetsios	33	1	34
33	LW	(Greece)	Nikos Korovesis	29	2	31
36	LW	(Netherlands)	Charlton Vicento	5	2	7
40	GK	(Greece)	Giorgos Abaris	1	1	2
44	CB	(Greece)	Apostolos Skondras	4	1	5
49	CM	(Greece)	Giannis Ioannou	0	0	0
77	GK	(Greece)	Dimitris Sotiriou	1	1	2
91	MF	(Romania)	Aurelian Chițu	3	0	3
96	CM	(Greece)	Kostas Kamperis	0	0	0
99	W	(Cameroon)	Franck Songo'o	4	0	4

Super League Greece

=== Goalscorers ===
No.	Pos.	Nat.	Name	Greek Super League	Greek Cup	Total
No.	Pos.	Nat.	Name	Goals	Goals	Goals
19	CM	(Argentina)	Tomas De Vincenti	5	0	5
9	CF	(Serbia)	Brana Ilić	5	0	5
21	CM	(Greece)	Stavros Tsoukalas	4	0	4
10	CM	(Argentina)	Cristian Gabriel Chávez	3	0	3
11	FW	(Albania)	Emiljano Vila	3	0	3
33	LW	(Greece)	Nikos Korovesis	3	0	3
3	DM	(Albania)	Andi Lila	2	0	2
26	CB	(Greece)	Dimitrios Kolovetsios	2	0	2
8	CB	(Greece)	Themistoklis Tzimopoulos	2	0	2
4	CB	(Greece)	Thodoris Berios	1	0	1
22	CM / LW	(Spain)	Noé Acosta	1	0	1
6	CB	(Greece)	Alexios Michail	1	0	1
25	CF	(Greece)	Tasos Kritikos	1	0	1
91	MF	(Romania)	Aurelian Chițu	1	0	1

Super League Greece

=== Clean sheets ===
No.	Pos.	Nat.	Name	Greek Super League	Greek Cup	Total
No.	Pos.	Nat.	Name	CS	CS	CS
1	GK	(Greece)	Markos Vellidis	8 (32)	0 (0)	8 (32)
40	GK	(Greece)	Giorgos Abaris	0 (1)	0 (1)	0 (2)
77	GK	(Greece)	Dimitris Sotiriou	0 (1)	1 (1)	1 (2)

=== Disciplinary record ===
S	P	N	Name	Super League			Greek Cup			Total		
S	P	N	Name	Yellow card	Yellow-red card	Red card	Yellow card	Yellow-red card	Red card	Yellow card	Yellow-red card	Red card
1	GK	(Greece)	Markos Vellidis	5	0	0	0	0	0	5	0	0
2	RB	(Greece)	Georgios Dasios	6	0	1	0	0	0	6	0	1
3	DM	(Albania)	Andi Lila	10	1	1	0	0	0	10	1	1
4	CB	(Greece)	Thodoris Berios	4	0	1	1	0	0	5	0	1
5	DM	(Senegal)	Paul Keita	0	1	0	0	0	0	0	1	0
6	CB	(Greece)	Alexios Michail	5	0	0	0	0	0	5	0	0
8	CB	(Greece)	Themistoklis Tzimopoulos	6	2	0	0	0	0	6	2	0
9	CF	(Serbia)	Brana Ilić	3	0	0	0	0	0	3	0	0
10	CM	(Argentina)	Cristian Gabriel Chávez	2	0	0	0	0	0	2	0	0
12	CF	(Greece)	Leonidas Kyvelidis	2	0	0	0	0	0	2	0	0
18	DM / CM	(Greece)	Michalis Avgenikou	1	0	0	1	0	0	2	0	0
19	CM	(Argentina)	Tomas De Vincenti	7	0	0	1	0	0	8	0	0
20	LB	(Albania) (Greece)	Simon Rrumbullaku	0	1	0	1	0	0	1	1	0
21	CM	(Greece)	Stavros Tsoukalas	3	0	0	0	0	0	3	0	0
22	CM / LW	(Spain)	Noé Acosta	5	0	0	0	0	0	5	0	0
23	RB	(Slovenia)	Andraž Struna	1	0	0	0	0	0	1	0	0
25	CF	(Greece)	Tasos Kritikos	1	0	0	0	0	0	1	0	0
26	CB	(Greece)	Dimitrios Kolovetsios	4	0	0	0	0	0	4	0	0
33	LW	(Greece)	Nikos Korovesis	7	0	0	1	0	0	8	0	0
