= List of Greek football transfers summer 2012 =

This is a list of Greek football transfers in the summer transfer window 2012 by club.

== Super League ==
=== AEK Athens ===
In:

Out:

No.	Pos.	Nation	Player
—	DF	POR	Yago Fernández (from (Spain) Girona)
—	FW	POR	Furtado (from (Greece) Panachaiki F.C.)
—	MF	ESP	Miguel Ángel Cordero (from (Spain) Xerez)
—	FW	GRE	Michalis Pavlis (from (Greece) Kavala F.C.)
—	DF	GRE	Georgios Koutroumpis (from (Greece) Kallithea)
—	DF	GRE	Christos Arkoudas (from (Greece) Kallithea)
—	DF	GRE	Michalis Tsamourlidis (from (Greece) Glyfada F.C.)
—	MF	GRE	Kostas Kotsaridis (from (Greece) Olympiacos)
—	MF	GRE	Nikos Kourellas (from (Greece) Aris)
—	FW	GRE	Andreas Stamatis (from (Greece) Panionios F.C.)
—	MF	GRE	Aineias Kalogeris (from (Greece) Thiva F.C.)
—	DF	GRE	Ntinos Nikolopoulos (from (Greece) Paniliakos F.C.)
—	DF	GRE	Kostas Tsoupros (from (Greece) Asteras Magoula F.C.)
—	MF	GRE	Giorgos Katidis (from (Greece) Aris)
—	GK	GRE	Ilias Makryonitis (from (Greece) Rouf F.C.)
—	FW	GRE	Nikolaos Katsikokeris (from (Greece) Ergotelis)
—	FW	GRE	Antonis Petropoulos (from (Greece) Panathinaikos)
—	MF	GRE	Pavlos Mitropoulos (on loan from (Greece) Panetolikos F.C.)

No.	Pos.	Nation	Player
1	MF	GRE	Pantelis Kafes (to (Greece) Veria)
3	DF	ISL	Elfar Freyr Helgason (to (Norway) Stabaek)
4	DF	GRE	Kostas Manolas (to (Greece) Olympiacos)
5	DF	GRE	Traianos Dellas (retired)
8	FW	CMR	Steve Leo Beleck (loan return to (Italy) Udinese)
9	MF	BRA	Leonardo (transfer to (South Korea) Jeonbuk Hyundai Motors)
10	MF	ESP	José Carlos (to (Spain) Rayo Vallecano)
11	FW	GRE	Dimitris Sialmas (to (Azerbaijan) FK Khazar Lankaran)
14	MF	GRE	Grigoris Makos (transfer to (Germany) 1860 Munich)
15	DF	GRE	Nikos Karabelas (to (Spain) Levante)
16	DF	GRE	Anestis Argyriou (to (Scotland) Rangers F.C.)
17	MF	GRE	Paul Katsetis (to (Italy) Calcio Catania)
19	MF	GRE	Panagiotis Lagos (to free agent)
21	MF	COL	Fabián Vargas (to (Argentina) Club Atlético Independiente)
22	FW	ISL	Eiður Guðjohnsen (to (Belgium) Cercle Brugge)
31	DF	GRE	Nikos Georgeas (to (Greece) Veria)
33	FW	GRE	Nikos Liberopoulos (retired)
77	MF	GRE	Viktor Klonaridis (transfer to (France) Lille)
—	DF	GRE	Stamatis Kalamiotis (to (Greece) Thrasyvoulos F.C.)
—	FW	GRE	Dimitris Froxylias (Free agent)
—	FW	ALB	Serxhio Abdurahmani (to (Greece) Fokikos F.C.)
—	FW	GRE	Georgios Nikoltsis (to (Greece) Glyfada F.C.)
—	DF	CYP	Giorgos Aresti (on loan to (Greece) Glyfada F.C.)
—	DF	CYP	Nikos Englezou (on loan to (Cyprus) Nea Salamis Famagusta)
—	DF	GRE	Spiros Matentzidis (on loan to (Greece) Korinthos F.C.)

=== Aris ===
In:

Out:

No.	Pos.	Nation	Player
—	DF	ESP	Rubén Pulido (from (Greece) Asteras Tripolis)
—	DF	GRE	Giorgos Margaritis (from (Greece) Agrotikos Asteras F.C.)
—	DF	GRE	Dimitris Aslanidis (from (Greece) Agrotikos Asteras F.C.)
—	DF	GRE	Nikos Pantidos (from (Greece) Ethnikos Asteras F.C.)
—	DF	GRE	Nikos Psychogios (from (Greece) Doxa Drama F.C.)
—	MF	POR	Nuno Miguel Prata Coelho (on loan from (Portugal) S.L. Benfica)
—	FW	ESP	David Aganzo (from (Spain) Hércules CF)

No.	Pos.	Nation	Player
—	MF	ARG	Javier Umbides (to (Turkey) Orduspor)
—	MF	MEX	Nery Castillo (to (Mexico) C.F. Pachuca)
—	MF	SEN	Ricardo Faty (to (France) AC Ajaccio)
—	DF	SEN	Khalifa Sankaré (to (Greece) Asteras Tripolis)
—	DF	GRE	Nikolaos Lazaridis (to (Greece) Atromitos F.C.)
—	DF	SUI	Eldin Jakupović (to (England) Hull City A.F.C.)
—	MF	BOL	Ronald García (to (Bolivia) Oriente Petrolero)
—	DF	BRA	Darcy Dolce Neto (to (Brazil) Esporte Clube Bahia)
—	GK	GRE	Michalis Sifakis (Free agent)
—	FW	GRE	Thanasis Topouzis (Free agent)
—	FW	ALG	Karim Soltani (to (Algeria) ES Sétif)
—	DF	BRA	Michel Garbini Pereira (Free agent)
—	DF	GHA	Francis Dickoh (Free agent)
—	MF	GRE	Athanassios Prittas (to (Greece) Panthrakikos F.C.)
—	MF	COL	Juan Carlos Toja (to (United States) New England Revolution)
—	MF	GRE	Giorgos Katidis (to (Greece) AEK Athens)

=== Asteras Tripolis ===
In:

Out:

No.	Pos.	Nation	Player
—	MF	GRE	Michail Fragoulakis (from (Greece) Ergotelis)
—	DF	GRE	Lefteris Gialousis (from (Greece) Ergotelis)
—	GK	HUN	Márton Fülöp (from (England) West Bromwich Albion)
—	MF	ESP	Marc Castells (from (Spain) FC Valencia Mestalla)
—	DF	SEN	Khalifa Sankaré (from (Greece) Aris)
—	FW	ESP	Cantó (from (Spain) Alcoyano)

No.	Pos.	Nation	Player
—	MF	BRA	Rogério Gonçalves Martins (to (Greece) Levadiakos)
—	DF	ESP	Rubén Pulido (to (Greece) Aris)
—	MF	GRE	Antonis Ladakis (to (Greece) Panthrakikos F.C.)
—	MF	GRE	Leonidas Argyropoulos (to (Greece) Platanias F.C.)
—	FW	SVK	Mário Breška (to (Greece) Panachaiki F.C.)
—	FW	ARG	Emmanuel Fernandes Francou (Free agent)
—	FW	GRE	Ilias Solakis (Free agent)
—	MF	SRB	Nemanja Arsenijević (Free agent)
—	DF	CRO	Goran Rubil (Free agent)
—	GK	GRE	Manolis Stefanakos (Free agent)

=== Atromitos ===
In:

Out:

No.	Pos.	Nation	Player
—	MF	GRE	Manolis Kallergis (from (Greece) Fokikos)
—	DF	GRE	Nikolaos Lazaridis (from (Greece) Aris)
—	DF	GRE	Stathis Tavlaridis (from (Greece) OFI)
—	FW	FIN	Njazi Kuqi (from (Greece) Panionios)
—	DF	GRE	Kostas Giannoulis (from (Germany) 1. FC Köln)

No.	Pos.	Nation	Player
14	FW	GRE	Ilias Anastasakos (to (Greece) Platanias F.C.)
19	MF	GRE	Stelios Sfakianakis (to (Greece) Panetolikos F.C.)
18	DF	GRE	Kostas Giannoulis (loan return to (Germany) 1. FC Köln)
23	FW	GRE	Kostas Mitroglou (loan return to (Greece) Olympiacos)
7	MF	GRE	Andreas Tatos (loan return to (Greece) Olympiacos)
5	DF	ENG	Wayne Thomas (to (Cyprus) Alki Larnaca)
24	DF	ANG	Francisco Zuela (to (Cyprus) APOEL)

=== Kerkyra ===
In:

Out:

No.	Pos.	Nation	Player
—	MF	ESP	Diego León (from (Cyprus) Nea Salamis Famagusta FC)
—	GK	GRE	Kiriakos Stratilatis (from (Greece) Levadiakos)
—	MF	GRE	Thodoris Karapetsas (from (Switzerland) FC Wohlen)
—	MF	GRE	Andreas Vasilogiannis (on loan from (Greece) Olympiacos)
—	MF	GRE	Panagiotis Stamogiannos (from (Greece) Olympiacos)

No.	Pos.	Nation	Player
—	FW	GRE	Ilias Ioannou (to (Greece) Veria F.C.)
—	MF	ESP	Ion Erice Domínguez (to CD Guadalajara (Spain))
—	GK	MLT	Justin Haber (to (Malta) Mosta F.C.)
—	MF	HAI	Yves Desmarets (to (Portugal) C.F. Os Belenenses)
—	MF	GRE	Dimitrios Grammozis (to (Germany) VfL Bochum II)
—	GK	CRO	Mario Galinović (Free agent)
—	DF	GER	Timo Wenzel (to (Germany) SV Elversberg)
—	FW	MKD	Goran Maznov (Free agent)
—	DF	GRE	Charidimos Michos (Free agent)
—	FW	GRE	Christos Kalantzis (Free agent)
—	FW	GRE	Athanasios Tsigas (to (Greece) (AEL)
—	DF	BRA	Gustavo Veronesi (Free agent)
—	MF	ENG	Abdul Osman (to (England) Crewe Alexandra F.C.)
—	FW	ARG	Juan Eduardo Martín (Free agent)

=== Levadiakos ===
In:

Out:

No.	Pos.	Nation	Player
—	MF	BRA	Rogério Gonçalves Martins (from (Greece) Asteras Tripolis)
—	DF	GRE	Georgios Georgiou (from (Greece) OFI)
—	MF	SRB	Kristijan Miljević (from (Italy) Brescia Calcio)
—	MF	ESP	Noé Acosta (from (Greece) Aris)
—	MF	ARG	Mauro Poy (from (Greece) Skoda Xanthi)
—	DF	ESP	Josemi (from (Spain) FC Cartagena)

No.	Pos.	Nation	Player

=== OFI ===
In:

Out:

No.	Pos.	Nation	Player
—	FW	GRE	Athanasios Papazoglou (from (Greece) PAOK FC)
—	MF	GRE	Vasilios Koutsianikoulis (from (Greece) Ergotelis F.C.)
—	DF	GRE	Giorgos Ioannidis (from (Greece) Panathinaikos F.C.)
—	MF	GRE	Andreas Labropoulos (from (Greece) Kerkyra)
—	DF	GRE	Giorgos Valerianos (from (Greece) Olympiacos F.C.)
—	DF	GRE	Panagiotis Kourdakis (from (Greece) PAOK FC)
—	DF	SEN	Mohamed Sarr (from (Belgium) K.R.C. Genk)

No.	Pos.	Nation	Player
—	FW	GRE	Vangelis Mantzios (to (Azerbaijan) FC Baku)
—	DF	GRE	Aris Galanopoulos (to (Cyprus) Enosis Neon Paralimni FC)
—	FW	GRE	Fotios Papoulis (to (Cyprus) Apollon Limassol)
—	DF	FRA	Kendal Ucar (to (Greece) Platanias F.C.)
—	MF	SRB	Željko Kalajdžić (to (Greece) Platanias F.C.)
—	DF	GRE	Minas Pitsos (to (Greece) Ergotelis F.C.)
—	DF	GRE	Efstathios Tavlaridis (to (Greece) Atromitos F.C.)
—	DF	GRE	Georgios Georgiou (to (Greece) Levadiakos)
—	MF	ESP	Jordi López (to (Ukraine) FC Hoverla Uzhhorod)
—	DF	HUN	Boldizsár Bodor (to (Belgium) Beerschot AC)
—	MF	ESP	Jorge López Montaña (Free agent)
—	FW	GRE	Leonidas Kampantais (to (Greece) Panionios)

=== Olympiacos ===
In:

Out:

No.	Pos.	Nation	Player
—	MF	SRB	Aleksandar Katai (loan return from (Serbia) FK Vojvodina)
—	MF	MNE	Petar Grbić (loan return from (Israel) Hapoel Be'er Sheva F.C.)
—	MF	BRA	Chumbinho (loan return from (Greece) Levadiakos)
—	DF	GRE	Giorgos Valerianos (loan return from (Greece) Glyfada F.C.)
—	MF	GRE	Andreas Vasilogiannis (loan return from (Greece) Glyfada F.C.)
—	DF	GRE	Giannis Zaradoukas (loan return from (Greece) PAS Giannina F.C.)
—	FW	GRE	Kostas Mitroglou (loan return from (Greece) Atromitos F.C.)
—	MF	GRE	Andreas Tatos (loan return from (Greece) Atromitos F.C.)
—	FW	GRE	Giorgos Niklitsiotis (loan return from (Netherlands) Helmond Sport)
—	DF	FRA	Claude Dielna (from (France) Istres)
—	MF	GRE	Panagiotis Vlachodimos (from (Greece) Skoda Xanthi)
—	DF	GRE	Dimitris Siovas (from (Greece) Panionios)
—	DF	GRE	Kostas Manolas (from (Greece) AEK Athens)
—	GK	GRE	Andreas Gianniotis (from (Greece) Ethnikos Gazoros F.C.)
—	DF	GRE	Vasilis Karagounis (from (Italy) Udinese Calcio)
—	MF	ITA	Leandro Greco (from (Italy) A.S. Roma)
—	MF	POR	Paulo Machado (from (France) Toulouse FC)
—	DF	CHI	Pablo Contreras (from (Chile) Colo-Colo)
—	MF	MLI	Drissa Diakite (from (France) OGC Nice)

No.	Pos.	Nation	Player
—	MF	TUR	Colin Kazim-Richards (loan return to (Turkey) Galatasaray S.K.)
—	MF	CMR	Jean Makoun (loan return to (England) Aston Villa F.C.)
—	DF	ESP	Ivan Marcano (loan return to (Spain) Villarreal CF)
—	MF	ESP	Pablo Orbaiz (loan return to (Spain) Athletic Bilbao)
—	DF	SWE	Olof Mellberg (to (Spain) Villarreal CF)
—	FW	BEL	Kevin Mirallas (to (England) Everton F.C.)
—	MF	ARG	Vicente Monje (to (Turkey) Orduspor)
—	FW	HUN	Krisztián Németh (to (Netherlands) Roda JC Kerkrade)
—	FW	BRA	Wanderson Costa Viana (to (South Africa) Ajax Cape Town F.C.)
—	MF	ESP	Javito (Free agent)
—	GK	GRE	Nikolas Papadopoulos (to (Germany) Fortuna Düsseldorf)
—	GK	GRE	Iosif Daskalakis (to (Greece) Veria F.C.)
—	MF	GRE	Panagiotis Stamogiannos (to (Greece) Kerkyra)
—	MF	GRE	Giorgos Niklitsiotis (to (Greece) PAS Giannina F.C.)
—	DF	GRE	Giorgos Valerianos (to (Greece) OFI)
—	MF	BRA	Chumbinho (on loan to (Greece) Atromitos F.C.)
—	MF	GRE	Andreas Vasilogiannis (on loan to (Greece) Kerkyra)
—	DF	GRE	Giannis Potouridis (on loan to (Greece) Platanias F.C.)
—	FW	GRE	Dimitrios Diamantakos (on loan to (Greece) Panionios F.C.)
—	DF	FRA	Claude Dielna (on loan to (France) CS Sedan Ardennes)
—	MF	SRB	Aleksandar Katai (on loan to (Serbia) FK Vojvodina)
—	FW	MNE	Petar Grbić (on loan to (Serbia) OFK Beograd)
—	GK	SRB	Ivan Babovic (on loan to (Greece) Panachaiki F.C.)

=== Panathinaikos ===
In:

Out:

No.	Pos.	Nation	Player
21	FW	NZL	Kosta Barbarouses (on loan from (Russia) Alania Vladikavkaz)
3	FW	CIV	Ibrahim Sissoko (on loan from (Germany) VfL Wolfsburg)
20	MF	SEN	Pape Habib Sow (from (Portugal) Academica)
5	DF	POR	André Almeida Pinto (from (Portugal) F.C. Porto)
44	DF	VEN	José Manuel Velázquez (from (Spain) Villarreal CF B)
14	FW	URU	Bruno Fornaroli (from (Italy) Sampdoria)
61	FW	GHA	Quincy Owusu-Abeyie (from (Qatar) Sadd Sports Club)

No.	Pos.	Nation	Player
3	DF	ESP	Josu Sarriegi (Free agent)
5	DF	MLI	Cédric Kanté (to (France) FC Sochaux-Montbéliard)
7	MF	GRE	Sotiris Ninis (to (Italy) Parma F.C.)
8	DF	GRE	Georgios Ioannidis (to (Greece) OFI)
18	DF	SWE	Mattias Bjärsmyr (to (Sweden) IFK Göteborg)
19	MF	FRA	Damien Plessis (to (France) AC Arles-Avignon)
23	MF	MOZ	Simão Mate Junior (to (China) Shandong Luneng Taishan F.C.)
26	MF	GRE	Giorgos Karagounis (to (England) Fulham F.C.)
29	MF	GRE	Kostas Katsouranis (Free agent)
36	MF	GRE	Sotiris Leontiou (to (Greece) Apollon Smyrnis)
38	MF	BRA	Alexandre Silva Cleyton (to (Turkey) Kayserispor)
39	DF	GRE	Christos Melissis (to (Greece) Panthrakikos F.C.)
71	FW	HUN	Gergely Rudolf (loan return to (Italy) Genoa C.F.C.)

=== Panionios ===
In:

Out:

No.	Pos.	Nation	Player
13	FW	GRE	Christos Aravidis (from (Greece) Doxa Drama)
15	DF	SWE	Dionysios Giannoulis (from (Sweden) IF Sylvia)
32	DF	GRE	Vasilios Lambropoulos (from (Greece) Ethnikos Asteras F.C.)
91	GK	NED	Kostas Peristerides (from (Netherlands) Almere City F.C.)
16	DF	GRE	Paraskevas Andralas (from (Greece) PAS Giannina F.C.)
99	FW	GRE	Dimitrios Diamantakos (on loan from (Greece) Olympiacos F.C.)
9	FW	GRE	Leonidas Kampantais (from (Greece) OFI)

No.	Pos.	Nation	Player
23	DF	GRE	Dimitris Siovas (to (Greece) Olympiacos)
19	FW	GRE	Andreas Stamatis (to (Greece) AEK Athens)
9	FW	FIN	Njazi Kuqi (to (Greece) Atromitos F.C.)
31	DF	GRE	Dimitris Petkakis (to (Cyprus) AEP Paphos)
77	GK	AUT	Jürgen Macho (Free agent)
26	FW	BEL	Patrick Dimbala (to (Greece) Panetolikos F.C.)
50	DF	FRA	Jean-Jacques Pierre (Free agent)
4	DF	GRE	Konstantinos Samaropoulos (Free agent)
40	FW	MLT	André Schembri (to (Cyprus) Omonia)
55	DF	POR	Vitorino Antunes (loan return to (Italy) A.S. Roma)

=== Panthrakikos ===
In:

Out:

No.	Pos.	Nation	Player
7	MF	GRE	Ilias Mihalopoulos (from (Greece) Kallithea)
22	MF	GRE	Nikos Katharios (from (Greece) Agrotikos Asteras)
30	GK	GRE	Giorgos Athanasiadis (from (Greece) Ethnikos Sochou)
2	DF	GRE	Christos Melissis (from (Greece) Panathinaikos)
10	MF	ARG	Adrián Lucero (from (Argentina) Olimpo)
19	FW	GRE	Leonidas Kyvelidis (from (Greece) Doxa Drama)
84	MF	GRE	Antonis Ladakis (from (Greece) Asteras Tripolis)
35	GK	BIH	Adi Adilović (from (Bosnia and Herzegovina) FK Sarajevo)
13	DF	ALG	Sofyane Cherfa (on loan from (Cyprus) Omonia Nicosia)
55	MF	GRE	Athanassios Prittas (from (Greece) Aris)
9	FW	GRE	Dimitrios Papadopoulos (from (Greece) Levadiakos)
6	FW	TAH	Marama Vahirua (on loan from (France) AS Nancy)
8	MF	MNE	Mladen Kašćelan (from (Poland) Jagiellonia Białystok)

No.	Pos.	Nation	Player
4	DF	GRE	Nikos Boutzikos (to (Greece) Anagennisi Giannitsa)
6	MF	GRE	Manolis Liapakis
7	MF	GRE	Thomas Vlachos
10	MF	SRB	Nikola Beljić (to (Greece) Atromitos)
11	FW	AUS	Ioannis Simosis
13	FW	GRE	Nikos Soultanidis
16	FW	GRE	Giannis Chloros
19	GK	GRE	Dimitris Tairis
20	MF	ARG	Daniel Ponce (to (Greece) AEL)
23	MF	BRA	Balú (to (Portugal) CS Marítimo)
28	DF	GRE	Stavros Vangelopoulos (to (Greece) Iraklis)
30	GK	GRE	Giorgos Sikalias (to (Greece) Iraklis Psachna)
33	MF	GRE	Vangelis Reklitis (to (Greece) Vyzas Megara)

=== PAOK ===
In:

Out:

No.	Pos.	Nation	Player
1	GK	ESP	Jacobo (from (Greece) Asteras Tripolis)
3	DF	GRE	Kostas Stafylidis (on loan from (Germany) Bayer 04 Leverkusen)
20	FW	IRL	Liam Lawrence (from (England) Portsmouth F.C.)
30	DF	RSA	Bongani Khumalo (on loan from (England) Tottenham Hotspur)
44	DF	BRA	Matheus Vivian (from (France) FC Nantes)

No.	Pos.	Nation	Player
1	GK	GRE	Kostas Chalkias (to Free agent)
3	DF	GRE	Kostas Stafylidis (to (Germany) Bayer 04 Leverkusen)
4	DF	GRE	Sotiris Balafas (to (Ukraine) FC Hoverla Uzhhorod)
8	DF	ITA	Bruno Cirillo (to (Cyprus) Alki Larnaca)
13	DF	GRE	Stelios Malezas (to (Germany) Fortuna Düsseldorf)
14	FW	GRE	Thanasis Papazoglou (to (Greece) OFI)
21	MF	SRB	Vladimir Ivic (Free agent)
27	DF	POL	Miroslaw Sznaucner (to (Greece) Veria F.C.)
28	MF	GRE	Stavros Tsoukalas (to (Greece) PAS Giannina F.C.)
88	FW	FRA	Frederic Nimani (loan return to (France) AS Monaco)
91	GK	CRO	Dario Krešić (to (Russia) FC Lokomotiv Moscow)

=== PAS Giannina ===
In:

Out:

No.	Pos.	Nation	Player
—	DF	GRE	Dimitrios Kolovetsios (from (Greece) AEL)
—	MF	GRE	Charis Kostakis (from (Greece) Iraklis)
—	GK	GRE	Apostolos Bakolas (from (Greece) Iraklis Psachna F.C.)
—	MF	GRE	Konstantinos Ganotis (from (Greece) Iraklis Psachna F.C.)
—	MF	GRE	Michalis Avgenikou (from (Greece) Diagoras F.C.)
—	MF	GRE	Kostas Pappas (loan return from (Greece) Doxa Kranoula F.C.)
—	DF	GRE	Nikos Korovesis (from (Greece) Apollon Smyrnis)
—	GK	GRE	Nikos Babaniotis (from (Greece) Panetolikos F.C.)
—	DF	GRE	Simos Roumpoulakos (from (Greece) Kalamata F.C.)
—	FW	GRE	Petros Topouzis (from (Greece) Tyrnavos 2005 F.C.)
—	FW	GRE	Giorgos Niklitsiotis (from (Netherlands) Helmond Sport)
—	FW	GRE	Stavros Tsoukalas (from (Greece) PAOK FC)
—	FW	GRE	Brana Ilić (from (Azerbaijan) FC Aktobe)
—	FW	GRE	Thodoris Berios (from (Czech Republic) FK Čáslav)

No.	Pos.	Nation	Player
—	GK	GRE	Fotis Kipouros (to (Greece) Platanias F.C.)
—	FW	CIV	Ibrahima Bakayoko (to (Greece) Olympiacos Volos F.C.)
—	DF	BRA	Vanderson Scardovelli (Free agent)
—	DF	GRE	Ilias Kotsios (to (Greece) Platanias F.C.)
—	MF	GRE	Anastasios Kyriakos (to (Greece) Niki Volos F.C.)
—	MF	GRE	Paraskevas Andralas (to (Greece) Panionios)
—	MF	GRE	Manolis Skoufalis (to (Greece) Niki Volos F.C.)
—	MF	ARG	Leandro Becerra (to (Azerbaijan) FC Baku)
—	DF	GRE	Giannis Zaradoukas (loan return to (Greece) Olympiacos F.C.)
—	MF	SUI	Fabrizio Zambrella (loan return to (Switzerland) FC Sion)

=== Platanias ===
In:

Out:

No.	Pos.	Nation	Player
--	GK	GRE	Fotis Kipouros (from (Greece) PAS Giannina)
--	DF	EQG	Lawrence Doe (from (Oman) Al-Shabab SC (Seeb))
--	DF	GRE	Petros Kanakoudis (from (Greece) Veria F.C.)
--	MF	SRB	Željko Kalajdžić (from (Greece) OFI)
--	MF	GRE	Leonidas Argyropoulos (from (Greece) Asteras Tripolis)
--	MF	FRA	Kendal Ucar (from (Greece) OFI)
--	FW	GRE	Ilias Anastasakos (from (Greece) Atromitos F.C.)
--	MF	ESP	Juan Aguilera (from (Spain) Real Murcia)
--	DF	GRE	Giannis Potouridis (on loan from (Greece) Olympiacos F.C.)
--	MF	VEN	Rubén Arocha (on loan from (Venezuela) Deportivo Tachira)

No.	Pos.	Nation	Player

=== Skoda Xanthi ===
In:

Out:

No.	Pos.	Nation	Player
80	FW	NGA	Benjamin Onwuachi (from (Greece) Panetolikos F.C.)
7	FW	GER	Panagiotis Triadis (from (Germany) SV Wehen Wiesbaden)
88	DF	BRA	Alex Cazumba (from (Brazil) São Paulo FC)
6	DF	BRA	Gleison Santos (from (Italy) Reggina Calcio)

No.	Pos.	Nation	Player
17	MF	GER	Panagiotis Vlachodimos (to (Greece) Olympiacos)
9	FW	GRE	Dimitris Souanis (to (Cyprus) Apollon Limassol)
6	DF	BRA	Edimar (loan return to (Romania) CFR Cluj)

=== Veria ===
In:

Out:

No.	Pos.	Nation	Player
77	DF	GRE	Nikos Georgeas (from (Greece) AEK Athens)
78	GK	GRE	Iosif Daskalakis (from (Greece) Olympiacos F.C.)
2	MF	POR	Zé Vítor (from (Cyprus) Apollon Limassol)
13	DF	POL	Mirosław Sznaucner (from (Greece) PAOK)
9	FW	GRE	Ilias Ioannou (from (Greece) Kerkyra)
5	MF	ESP	Guillermo Pérez Moreno (from (Spain) Sporting de Gijón B)
26	MF	SUI	Damian Bellón (from (Switzerland) SC Brühl)
29	DF	ENG	Wayne Thomas (from (Greece) Atromitos F.C.)
22	DF	BRA	Everton Santos Bezerra (from (Brazil) Esporte Clube Juventude)
55	GK	ESP	Jonathan Lopez Perez (from (Spain) Albacete Balompié)
10	MF	ESP	Carlos Menéndez Hevia (from (Spain) Sporting de Gijón B)
24	MF	GRE	Pantelis Kafes (from (Greece) AEK Athens)
19	FW	HON	Carlos Costly (from (Mexico) Club Atlas)
14	DF	BRA	Orestes Junior Alves (from (Iran) S.C. Damash)
27	MF	ARG	Aldo Duscher (Free agent)
2	MF	MEX	Pedro Arce (from (Switzerland) FC Baulmes)
8	MF	CMR	Marcus Mokake (from (Greece) Kavala F.C.)

No.	Pos.	Nation	Player
10	DF	GRE	Petros Kanakoudis (to (Greece) Platanias F.C.)
12	MF	FRA	Yoann Langlet (to (Cyprus) Enosis Neon Paralimni FC)
19	FW	RSA	Calvin Kadi (to (South Africa) Bidvest Wits)
22	DF	TUR	Erol Bulut (Free agent)
24	FW	POL	Emmanuel Olisadebe (Free agent)
5	DF	GRE	Dimitris Samaras (to (Greece) Niki Volos F.C)
9	MF	GRE	Giorgos Lanaris (Retired)
8	MF	GRE	Agisilaos Passas (Free agent)
15	FW	GRE	Stefanos Kapias (to (Greece) Ethnikos Gazoros F.C)
2	MF	GRE	Giannis Vergos (to (Greece) Votaniakos F.C)
14	DF	CIV	Serge Die (to (Greece) Kavala F.C.)
17	MF	SRB	Giorgos Skatharoudis (on loan to (Greece) Anagennisi Giannitsa)
28	MF	MEX	Pedro Arce (on loan to (Greece) Anagennisi Giannitsa)
