= Charis Charisis =

Greek footballer (born 1995)

Personal information
- Full name: Charilaos Charisis
- Date of birth: 12 January 1995 (age 31)
- Place of birth: Ioannina, Greece
- Height: 1.77 m (5 ft 10 in)
- Position: Midfielder

Team information
- Current team: Sivasspor
- Number: 8

Youth career
- 2008–2013: PAS Giannina

Senior career*
Years	Team	Apps	(Gls)
2013–2015	PAS Giannina	26	(0)
2015–2019	PAOK	29	(2)
2017–2018	→ Sint-Truiden (loan)	22	(1)
2018–2019	→ Kortrijk (loan)	18	(0)
2019–2022	Atromitos	75	(1)
2022–	Sivasspor	117	(4)

International career
2015–2016	Greece U21	11	(1)
- * Club domestic league appearances and goals as of 6 May 2026

Charilaos Charisis (Greek: Χάρης Χαρίσης; born 12 January 1995) is a Greek professional footballer who plays as a midfielder for Turkish Süper Lig club Sivasspor.

== Career ==
=== PAS Giannina ===
Born in Ioannina, Charisis began playing football with PAS Giannina. On 19 January 2014, he made his professional debut for PAS Giannina in a match against AEL Kalloni.

=== PAOK ===
Charisis will wear the jersey of PAOK from summer 2015 along with Nikos Korovesis. The two aces will be two of several acquisitions of PAOK in summer season. The players were about to sign to PAOK with the consent of the administration of PAS Giannina. According to absolutely reliable information is an agreement between the two major shareholders. Both are agreed on all the basics, with PAOK, but however nothing is announced yet.

On 25 June 2015, PAOK announced the acquisition of the player for four years for an undisclosed fee. On 25 October 2015, he made his Super League debut with the club in a 3–1 home win against rivals Panathinaikos. On 10 January 2016, he scored his first goal against his hometown team PAS Giannina in a 3–0 home win game.

==== Loan to Sint-Truiden ====
On 26 June 2017, the details of Charisis borrowing to Belgian club Sint-Truiden are of interest as they prove that the deal is identical to what was done for Stelios Kitsiou. The borrowing comes with a €1.5 million purchase option and 20% resale. On 2 December 2017, he scored his first goal with the club in an away 1–1 draw against Royal Excel Mouscron. On 1 January 2018, he suffered a tear in the abductor muscle, following by a training deficit due to technical turf, that kept him out of the squad for almost 3 months.

==== Loan to Kortrijk ====
On 23 August 2018, Charisis will continue his career in Belgium as a loan from PAOK. The Belgian team announced the acquisition of the 24-year midfielder, while retaining a purchase option for the summer of 2019.

=== Atromitos ===
On 24 June 2019, Charisis penned a two-year deal with the Peristeri-based club. Charisis, a versatile midfielder, shared his emotions from the move: “I am very happy to join the Atromitos family. This is a new challenge for me and I will do my best to prove that I can offer a lot to this team. I will help the team achieve its goals in both Greece and Europe. Tomorrow, I am looking forward to training with the team for the first time in front of our fans.” Charisis has moved to Atromitos as a free agent after leaving PAOK.

On 7 June 2021, the club extended his contract for two more years, until 2023.

In the summer of 2022, Sivasspor made three official offers to acquire Charisis, but all of them were turned down by Atromitos.

=== Sivasspor ===
On 24 August 2022, Charisis was presented as a new Sivasspor player along 6 other players, including Clinton N'Jie, Murat Paluli and Kader Keita.

== Career statistics ==
As of match played 29 March 2025

Appearances and goals by club, season and competition
Club	Season	League			Cup		Continental (Note: Appearances in UEFA Champions League and UEFA Europa League)		Total	
Club	Season	Division	Apps	Goals	Apps	Goals	Apps	Goals	Apps	Goals
PAS Giannina	2012–13	Super League Greece	1	0	—		—		1	0
PAS Giannina	2013–14	Super League Greece	3	0	0	0	—		3	0
PAS Giannina	2014–15	Super League Greece	22	0	3	0	—		25	0
PAS Giannina	Total		26	0	3	0	—		29	0
PAOK	2015–16	Super League Greece	18	2	4	0	2	0	24	2
PAOK	2016–17	Super League Greece	11	0	4	0	3	0	18	0
PAOK	Total		29	2	8	0	5	0	42	2
Sint-Truiden (loan)	2017–18	Belgian First Division A	22	1	2	0	—		24	1
Kortrijk (loan)	2018–19	Belgian First Division A	18	0	1	0	—		19	0
Atromitos	2019–20	Super League Greece	25	0	3	0	4	0	32	0
Atromitos	2020–21	Super League Greece	27	1	2	0	—		29	1
Atromitos	2021–22	Super League Greece	23	0	0	0	—		23	0
Atromitos	Total		75	1	5	0	4	0	84	1
Sivasspor	2022–23	Süper Lig	26	1	4	0	8	0	38	1
Sivasspor	2023–24	Süper Lig	31	1	1	0	—		32	2
Sivasspor	2024–25	Süper Lig	27	1	2	0	—		29	1
Sivasspor	Total		84	3	7	0	8	0	99	3
Career total			254	7	26	0	17	0	297	7

== Honours ==
PAOK

- Greek Cup: 2016–17

Individual

- Super League Greece Young Player of the Season: 2014–15, 2015–16
