= Nikos Korovesis =

Greek footballer

Personal information
- Full name: Nikolaos Korovesis
- Date of birth: 10 August 1991 (age 35)
- Place of birth: Chalkida, Greece
- Height: 1.76 m (5 ft 9 1/2 in)
- Position: Left-back

Team information
- Current team: Kozani
- Number: 34

Youth career
- 2010–2011: Panionios

Senior career*
Years	Team	Apps	(Gls)
2011–2012	Apollon Smyrnis	19	(4)
2012–2015	PAS Giannina	84	(13)
2015–2017	PAOK	14	(2)
2017	→ PAS Giannina (loan)	7	(0)
2017–2018	Platanias	20	(1)
2018–2022	OFI	97	(1)
2022–2023	Apollon Smyrnis	23	(1)
- * Club domestic league appearances and goals as of 16 June 2023

Nikos Korovesis (Greek: Νίκος Κοροβέσης; born 10 August 1991) is a Greek professional footballer who plays as a left-back for Super League 2 club Kozani.

== Career ==
Born in Chalkida, Korovesis began playing football with Apollon Smyrnis. Nikos Korovesis moved PAOK in the summer of 2015 along with Charis Charisis. The two aces will be two of several acquisitions of PAOK in summer season. The players were about to sign to PAOK with the consent of the administration of PAS Giannina. According to absolutely reliable information is an agreement between the two major shareholders. Both are agreed on all the basics, with PAOK, but however nothing is announced yet.

On 25 June 2015, Korovesis signed a three years' contract with PAOK for an undisclosed fee. In summer 2016, PAOK officially announced that the winger was not in club's plans for the 2016–17 season. On 31 January 2017 he was loaned to PAS Giannina for six months. On 3 August 2017, he signed a two years' contract with Platanias with an undisclosed fee. On 29 March 2018, the administration of struggling Platanias officially announced the mutual termination of Nikos Korovesis contract. On 12 June 2018, Korovesis joined OFI on a free transfer. On 9 December 2018, he scored his first goal for the club in an important 3–1 home win against Panathinaikos, only the second of the season.

On 29 May 2019, he signed a contract extension until the summer of 2021.

== Career statistics ==
=== Club ===
As of 22 May 2022

Club	Season	League			Greek Cup		Continental		Total	
Club	Season	Division	Apps	Goals	Apps	Goals	Apps	Goals	Apps	Goals
PAS Giannina	2012–13	Super League Greece	31	7	1	0	—		32	7
PAS Giannina	2013–14	Super League Greece	29	3	2	0	—		31	3
PAS Giannina	2014–15	Super League Greece	24	3	0	0	—		24	3
PAS Giannina	Total		84	13	3	0	—		87	13
PAOK	2015–16	Super League Greece	14	2	4	0	2	0	20	2
PAOK	2016–17	Super League Greece	0	0	2	0	0	0	2	0
PAOK	Total		14	2	6	0	2	0	22	2
PAS Giannina (loan)	2016–17	Super League Greece	7	0	0	0	—		7	0
Platanias	2017–18	Super League Greece	20	1	3	0	—		23	1
OFI	2018–19	Super League Greece	28	1	3	0	—		31	1
OFI	2019–20	Super League Greece	31	0	4	1	—		35	1
OFI	2020–21	Super League Greece	30	0	2	0	1	0	33	0
OFI	2021–22	Super League Greece	8	0	2	0	—		10	0
OFI	Total		97	1	11	1	1	0	109	2
Career total			222	17	23	1	3	0	248	18
