= Konstantinos Kamperis =

Greek footballer

Personal information
- Full name: Konstantinos Kamperis
- Date of birth: 10 July 1996 (age 30)
- Place of birth: Larissa, Greece
- Height: 1.81 m (5 ft 11 in)
- Position: Midfielder

Youth career
- 2003–2013: AEL
- 2013–2014: Machitis Terpsithea
- 2014: PAS Giannina
- 2014–2015: AEL

Senior career*
Years	Team	Apps	(Gls)
2015–2016	Oikonomos Tsaritsani	30	(1)
2016–2021	Apollon Larissa	45	(0)
- * Club domestic league appearances and goals as of 18 May 2021

Konstantinos Kamperis (Greek: Κωνσταντίνος Καμπέρης; born 10 July 1996) is a Greek professional footballer who plays as a midfielder.
