= Alexandros Tsoutsis =

Greek footballer

Personal information
- Date of birth: 12 October 1991 (age 35)
- Place of birth: Athens, Greece
- Height: 1.78 m (5 ft 10 in)
- Position: Winger

Team information
- Current team: Karaiskakis
- Number: 44

Youth career
- Ethnikos Piraeus

Senior career*
Years	Team	Apps	(Gls)
2010–2011	Ethnikos Piraeus	2	(0)
2011–2012	Glyfada		
2012–2013	Panserraikos	26	(3)
2013–2014	Iraklis Psachna	31	(2)
2014–2015	Apollon Pontus	21	(2)
2015–2016	Chania	25	(2)
2016–2017	Panserraikos	21	(0)
2017–2018	Doxa Drama	7	(0)
2018	Fribourg	0	(0)
2018–2019	Kavala	0	(0)
2019–	Karaiskakis	26	(3)
- * Club domestic league appearances and goals as of 18 May 2021

Alexandros Tsoutsis (Greek: Αλέξανδρος Τσούτσης; born 12 October 1991) is a Greek professional footballer who plays as a winger for Super League 2 club Karaiskakis.
