= Željko Kalajdžić =

Serbian footballer and coach

Personal information
- Date of birth: 11 May 1978 (age 48)
- Place of birth: Belgrade, SFR Yugoslavia
- Height: 1.76 m (5 ft 9 1/2 in)
- Position: Midfielder

Team information
- Current team: Al-Ahli (asst. manager)

Senior career*
Years	Team	Apps	(Gls)
1994–1997	Hajduk Beograd	49	(7)
1997–1998	Zemun	11	(1)
1998–1999	Villarreal	0	(0)
1999–2000	Logroñés	14	(1)
2000–2005	Zemun	128	(10)
2005–2008	Voždovac	71	(16)
2007	→ Incheon United (loan)	12	(0)
2008–2010	Kavala	27	(2)
2010–2012	OFI	73	(4)
2012–2013	Platanias	30	(1)
2013–2015	OFI	54	(1)

Managerial career
- 2017–2020: Brodarac U19
- 2020: IMT
- 2021: Zemun
- 2021: Panachaiki
- 2022: Mačva Šabac (asst.)
- 2023: Ethnikos Achna (asst.)
- 2023: Volos (asst.)
- 2024-: Al-Ahli (BHR) (asst.)
- * Club domestic league appearances and goals as of 17 August 2021

Željko Kalajdžić (Serbian Cyrillic: Жељко Калајџић; born 11 May 1978) is a Serbian football manager and former player. He is the current assistant manager of Bahraini club Al-Ahli.
