= Michalis Avgenikou =

Greek professional footballer

Personal information
- Full name: Michail Avgenikou
- Date of birth: 25 January 1993 (age 33)
- Place of birth: Pastida, Rhodes, Greece
- Height: 1.80 m (5 ft 11 in)
- Position: Defensive midfielder

Team information
- Current team: Diagoras
- Number: 8

Youth career
- Asteras Pastidas
- –2010: Diagoras

Senior career*
Years	Team	Apps	(Gls)
2010–2012	Diagoras	18	(1)
2012–2015	PAS Giannina	26	(0)
2015–2016	Ergotelis	17	(1)
2016	Kissamikos	10	(1)
2016–2017	Lamia	19	(0)
2017–2018	Rodos	0	(0)
2018	Irodotos	5	(1)
2019	Doxa Drama	11	(0)
2019	Ialysos	12	(1)
2020–	Diagoras	19	(0)

International career
2011–2012	Greece U19	3	(0)
- * Club domestic league appearances and goals as of 19 May 2021

Michalis Avgenikou (Greek: Μιχάλης Αυγενικού; born 25 January 1993) is a Greek professional footballer who plays as a defensive midfielder for Super League 2 club Diagoras.

== Career ==
Born in Pastida, Avgenikou began playing football with Asteras Pastidas. He then moved to local side Diagoras, playing for the club's U-20 before signing his first professional contract with the club in 2010. Within a span of two years, Avgenikou played in a total of 18 matches, scoring 1 goal. On 11 April 2012, he made his debut for the Greece U19 in a friendly match against Slovenia U19. On 30 June 2012, Avgenikou was acquired by Greek Super League club PAS Giannina. He made a total of 26 appearances for the Epirus-based club during a three-year period. On 29 August 2015, Avgenikou signed a two-year contract with Football League club Ergotelis. He stayed with Ergotelis until January 2016, when the club announced its withdrawal from professional competitions due to unmanageable financial issues. Avgenikou was subsequently released from his contract, along with his fellow 16 teammates who chose to stay with the club until the very end, having made a total of 17 appearances during the season and having scored one goal. He then moved to fellow Cretan second-tier club Kissamikos.
