= Aristotelis Karagiannidis =

Greek footballer (born in 1995)

Personal information
- Date of birth: 15 June 1990 (age 36)
- Place of birth: Ioannina, Greece
- Height: 1.90 m (6 ft 3 in)
- Position: Centre-back

Team information
- Current team: Karaiskakis
- Number: 5

Youth career
- AO Anatolis

Senior career*
Years	Team	Apps	(Gls)
2008–2009	Egaleo		
2009–2010	Doxa Kranoula		
2010–2011	Rodos		
2011–2012	Rouvas	3	(0)
2012	Tilikratis	14	(0)
2012–2013	Doxa Kranoula	8	(0)
2013	Kassiopi	10	(2)
2013–2016	Kerkyra	21	(0)
2015	→ Pierikos (loan)	14	(1)
2016–	Karaiskakis	44	(0)
- * Club domestic league appearances and goals as of 6 March 2020

Aristotelis Karagiannidis (Greek: Αριστοτέλης Καραγιαννίδης; born 15 June 1990) is a Greek professional footballer who plays as a centre-back for Super League 2 club Karaiskakis, for which he is captain.
