= Alexios Michail =

Greek footballer

Alexis Michail
Personal information
- Full name: Alexios Michail
- Date of birth: 18 August 1986 (age 40)
- Place of birth: Ioannina, Greece
- Height: 1.83 m (6 ft 0 in)
- Position: Centre back

Youth career
- –2004: PAS Giannina

Senior career*
Years	Team	Apps	(Gls)
2004–2019	PAS Giannina	274	(11)
2006–2007	→ Lamia (loan)	17	(2)
2009–2010	→ Panserraikos (loan)	21	(1)
2019–2021	AEL	47	(1)
2021–2022	Xanthi	23	(0)
Total		382	(15)
- * Club domestic league appearances and goals as of 25 November 2025

Alexios Michail (Greek: Αλέξιος Μιχαήλ; born 18 August 1986) is a retired Greek professional footballer who played as a centre back.

== Career ==
=== PAS Giannina ===
At the age of 6, Michail started playing football at PAS Giannina. In 2004, he signed his first contract with PAS Giannina. He was part of PAS Giannina for 15 years, except the two periods of loan. He was the captain and the footballer who scored the first European goal.

Michail went on loan to Lamia and Panserraikos early in his football career.
