= Arben Muskaj =

Albanian footballer

Personal information
- Full name: Arben Muskaj
- Date of birth: 27 June 1994 (age 32)
- Place of birth: Fier, Albania
- Height: 1.75 m (5 ft 9 in)
- Position: Striker

Youth career
- –2011: Olympiacos
- 2011–2013: PAS Giannina

Senior career*
Years	Team	Apps	(Gls)
2013–2015	PAS Giannina		
2014–2015	→ Partizani Tirana		
2015–2018	Bylis Ballsh		
2018–2019	Paramythia		

International career
2011–2012	Albania U17	25	(18)
2012–2013	Albania U19	24	
2013–2014	Albania U20		
2014–2015	Albania U21	2	(1)
- * Club domestic league appearances and goals

Arben Muskaj (born 27 June 1994 in Patos, Albania) is an Albanian former footballer who currently played as a striker.

== Career ==
=== Under-20 ===
Muskaj was part of the Albania U20 side that competed in the 2013 Mediterranean Games held in Mersin, Turkey where he played in all five games.
