= Antonis Ladakis =

Greek footballer (born 1982)

Personal information
- Full name: Antonios Ladakis
- Date of birth: 25 January 1982 (age 44)
- Place of birth: Kavala, Greece
- Height: 1.78 m (5 ft 10 in)
- Position: Midfielder

Youth career
- 2000–2004: ILTEX Lykoi
- 2004–2006: Agrotikos Asteras

Senior career*
Years	Team	Apps	(Gls)
2006–2012	Asteras Tripolis	79	(2)
2012–2016	Panthrakikos	85	(2)
2016–2017	Kavala		
2017–	Doxa Drama		
- * Club domestic league appearances and goals as of 21 July 2016

Antonis Ladakis (Greek: Αντώνης Λαδάκης; born 25 January 1982) is a Greek former professional footballer who played as a midfielder.

== Career ==
Born in Kavala, Ladakis began playing professional football with ILTEX Lykoi in 2000. He joined Agrotikos Asteras for two seasons in 2004. He signed with Asteras Tripolis in 2006. After six years in Asteras Tripolis, he joined Panthrakikos in the summer of 2012.
