= Leonidas Kyvelidis =

Greek footballer

Personal information
- Date of birth: 8 February 1986 (age 40)
- Place of birth: Jambyl, Kazakhstan
- Height: 1.82 m (5 ft 11 1/2 in)
- Position: Striker

Senior career*
Years	Team	Apps	(Gls)
2004–2006	Pierikos	16	(4)
2006–2007	Egaleo	3	(1)
2007–2008	Chaidari	21	(7)
2008–2009	Egaleo	26	(7)
2009–2012	Panachaiki	76	(34)
2012	Doxa Drama	17	(4)
2012–2013	Panthrakikos	16	(1)
2013–2014	Kerkyra	12	(5)
2014	PAS Giannina	4	(0)
2014–2015	Apollon Smyrnis	11	(4)
2015	Panachaiki	16	(7)
2015–2016	Aris	25	(10)
2016–2019	Apollon Pontus	72	(22)
2019–2020	Karaiskakis	19	(8)
2020–2021	Pierikos	12	(3)
2021–2022	Panachaiki	23	(4)
2022–2023	APS Patrai	8	(2)
2023	Kyparissia		

Managerial career
- 2023–2025: Ethnikos Patras
- 2025: Panachaiki
- * Club domestic league appearances and goals

Leonidas Kyvelidis (Greek: Λεωνίδας Κυβελίδης, born 8 February 1986) is a Greek football manager and former player.

== Career ==
Kyvelidis played the majority of his career in Beta and Gamma Ethniki teams, namely Pierikos, Egaleo, Chaidari and Panachaiki. He was named top scorer of the 2009–10 Gamma Ethniki, having scored 24 goals for Panachaiki.
