= Guille (footballer, born 1987) =

Spanish footballer

Personal information
- Full name: Guillermo Pérez Moreno
- Date of birth: 11 January 1987 (age 39)
- Place of birth: Murcia, Spain
- Height: 1.70 m (5 ft 7 in)
- Position: Midfielder

Team information
- Current team: Casale
- Number: 13

Youth career
- Puçol
- Valencia

Senior career*
Years	Team	Apps	(Gls)
2005–2007	Valencia B		
2007–2009	Deportivo B	38	(3)
2009–2012	Sporting B	66	(6)
2011	→ Albacete (loan)	3	(0)
2012–2014	Veria	24	(2)
2014–2015	Panthrakikos	10	(0)
2015	Lamia	12	(0)
2015–2016	Aris	0	(0)
2016–2017	Borgosesia	27	(4)
2017–2018	Gozzano	31	(4)
2018–2019	Lecco	5	(0)
2019–2020	Legnano	16	(0)
2020	Sant'Angelo		
2020–2021	Casatese	21	(0)
2021	PDHAE	5	(1)
2021–	Casale	29	(4)
- * Club domestic league appearances and goals as of 13 November 2022

Guillermo Pérez Moreno (born 11 January 1987), commonly known as Guille, is a Spanish footballer who plays as a left midfielder for Italian club Casale.

== Club career ==
On 24 July 2019, he signed with Serie D club Legnano.
