= Karim Fegrouche =

Moroccan footballer

Personal information
- Date of birth: 14 February 1982 (age 44)
- Place of birth: Fes, Morocco
- Height: 1.85 m (6 ft 1 in)
- Position: Goalkeeper

Senior career*
Years	Team	Apps	(Gls)
1999–2007	Maghreb Fez	130	(0)
2007–2011	Wydad Casablanca	70	(0)
2011–2013	PAS Giannina	38	(0)
2013–2015	AEL Limassol	37	(0)
2015–2016	FAR Rabat	3	(0)
2016–2018	IK Sirius	11	(0)
2021	IK Sirius	0	(0)

International career
2008–2014	Morocco	4	(0)
- * Club domestic league appearances and goals

Karim Fegrouche (Arabic: كريم فكروش; born 14 February 1982) is a Moroccan former football goalkeeper.

== Club career ==
=== PAS Giannina ===
In 2011, he signed for PAS Giannina, helping the team to stay in the Super League Greece. The 2012–13 season started very well for Fegrouche – on 21 October 2012 he saved a penalty from Marama Vahirua against Panthrakikos and on 3 December he saved another penalty from Roger Guerreiro against AEK Athens.

=== AEL Limassol ===
In 2013, he signed for AEL Limassol, to replace Matías Degra

Fegrouche played in Sweden for IK Sirius from 2016 to 2018, only getting league appearances in 2018. He retired after that, but in the summer of 2021 he made a comeback on the Sirius bench against Djurgården.

== International career ==
Fegrouche made his debut for the Morocco national football team in a friendly match against Benin on 20 August 2008.
