= Charis Kostakis =

Greek footballer

Personal information
- Full name: Charilaos Kostakis
- Date of birth: 12 July 1990 (age 36)
- Place of birth: Ioannina, Greece
- Height: 1.75 m (5 ft 9 in)
- Position: Midfielder

Youth career
- 2005–2006: Ajax
- 2006–2007: Zeeburgia
- 2007–2009: Stormvogels Telstar

Senior career*
Years	Team	Apps	(Gls)
2009–2011	Ethnikos Piraeus	30	(1)
2011–2012	Mladá Boleslav	0	(0)
2012	Iraklis	12	(1)
2012	PAS Giannina	0	(0)
2013	Domžale	5	(0)
2013–2015	Panionios	0	(0)
2015	Alimos	0	(0)

International career^{‡}
	Greece U17	3	(0)
- * Club domestic league appearances and goals as of 06:41, 23 May 2013 (UTC) ‡ National team caps and goals as of 17:17, 14 January 2013 (UTC)

Charis Kostakis (Greek: Χάρης Κωστάκης; born 12 July 1990) is a Greek former professional footballer who played as a midfielder.

== Career ==
Although he was born in Ioannina, Kostakis began playing football in the youth system of Ajax Amsterdam at age 15. Ajax loaned him to Dutch amateur side Stormvogels Telstar at age 19. Soon after, Kostakis returned to Greece and joined Greek second division club Ethnikos Piraeus F.C. on a three-year contract.

In July 2011, Kostakis joined the Czech Cup-winning side FK Mladá Boleslav.

In January 2012, Kostakis joined Iraklis and in the following summer he was transferred to Super League Greece PAS Giannina F.C. Moreover, he has played for NK Domžale in the Slovenian PrvaLiga.

Kostakis has also played for the Greece U17 national team.
