= Giannis Nakos =

Greek footballer

Personal information
- Full name: Giannis Nakos
- Date of birth: 23 February 1993 (age 33)
- Place of birth: Ioannina, Greece
- Height: 1.83 m (6 ft 0 in)
- Position: Striker

Team information
- Current team: Doxa Kranoula F.C.

Youth career
- Atromitos Ioanninon
- PAS Giannina

Senior career*
Years	Team	Apps	(Gls)
2013–2015	PAS Giannina	5	(0)
2015–2017	Thesprotos	36	(6)
2017–2018	Asteras Parapotamos F.C.	0	(0)
2018–	Doxa Kranoula F.C.	0	(0)
- * Club domestic league appearances and goals

Giannis Nakos (Greek: Γιάννης Νάκος; born 23 February 1993) is a Greek professional footballer who plays for Asteras Parapotamou, in the Gamma Ethniki, as striker.

== Career ==
=== PAS Giannina ===
Born in Ioannina, Nakos began playing football with PAS Giannina. On 26 May 2013, he made his professional debut for PAS Giannina in a match against PAOK fon the second game of playoffs. In July 2015 released from PAS Giannina.

=== Thesprotos Igoumenitsa ===
On summer 2015 he signed on Thesprotos. He had 36 appearances and 6 goals in Gamma Ethniki.

=== Asteras Parapotamou ===
On summer 2017 he signed on Asteras Parapotamou.

=== Doxa Kranoulas ===
In January 2018 he signed on Doxa Kranoulas.
