= Charalambos Tabasis =

Greek footballer

Personal information
- Full name: Charalambos Tabasis
- Date of birth: May 10, 1986 (age 40)
- Place of birth: Athens, Greece
- Height: 1.98 m (6 ft 6 in)
- Position: Goalkeeper

Youth career
- 1998–2006: Panionios

Senior career*
Years	Team	Apps	(Gls)
2006–2010	Panionios	1	(0)
2008–2009	→ Ilisiakos (loan)	21	(0)
2009–2010	→ Egaleo (loan)	23	(0)
2010–2011	Diagoras	30	(0)
2011–2013	PAS Giannina	6	(0)
- * Club domestic league appearances and goals

Charalambos Tabasis (Greek: Χαράλαμπος Ταμπάσης; born 15 May 1986) is a retired Greek football player who played as goalkeeper. Following the end of the 2012/13 season, he had to abandon his playing career at the age of 27 due to Stargardt disease.
