= Panagiotis Stamogiannos =

Greek footballer

Personal information
- Full name: Panagiotis Stamogiannos
- Date of birth: 30 January 1992 (age 34)
- Place of birth: Elos, Greece
- Height: 1.80 m (5 ft 11 in)
- Position: Midfielder

Youth career
- Evrotas Elous
- Olympiacos

Senior career*
Years	Team	Apps	(Gls)
2010–2012	Olympiacos	0	(0)
2010	→ Doxa Drama (loan)	1	(0)
2011	→ Thrasyvoulos (loan)	11	(0)
2012–2013	Kerkyra	13	(0)
2013–2014	Vyzas Megara	14	(3)
2014–2016	Panegialios	42	(2)
2016	Sparta	1	(0)
2016–2020	Asteras Vlahioti	91	(0)
2020–2023	Aris Skalas		
2023–2024	Pangytheatikos		

International career
2008–2010	Greece U17	6	(1)
2011–	Greece U19	9	(1)
- * Club domestic league appearances and goals as of 14 January 2014

Panagiotis Stamogiannos (Greek: Παναγιώτης Σταμoγιάννος, born 30 January 1992) is a Greek football player who last played for Pangytheatikos as a central midfielder.

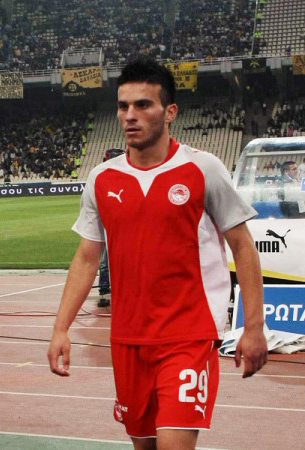
Panagiotis Stamogiannos in the game Olympiakos-Aek 2010
