= Georgios Niklitsiotis =

Greek footballer

Personal information
- Full name: Georgios Niklitsiotis
- Date of birth: 23 March 1991 (age 35)
- Place of birth: Trikala, Greece
- Height: 1.71 m (5 ft 7 in)
- Positions: Winger; attacking midfielder

Youth career
- Olympiacos

Senior career*
Years	Team	Apps	(Gls)
2008–2012	Olympiacos	2	(0)
2010–2011	→ OFI (loan)	4	(0)
2011	→ Thrasyvoulos (loan)	11	(0)
2011–2012	→ Helmond Sport (loan)	16	(1)
2012–2013	PAS Giannina	13	(0)
2014–2015	Niki Volos	10	(0)
2015	Lamia	6	(0)
2015–2016	Panargiakos	4	(1)
2016–2017	Niki Volos	1	(0)
2017–2019	Aittitos Spata	6	(0)
2019	Nestos	2	(0)
2019	Trikala	2	(0)
2019–2020	Asteras Vlachioti		
2021	Olympiacos Volos		
2021–2022	Tilikratis		
2022–2023	P.O. Fikis		
2023–2025	Thyella Kamari		

International career^{‡}
2008–2010	Greece U19	6	(8)
- * Club domestic league appearances and goals as of 2 December 2018 ‡ National team caps and goals as of 4 June 2012

Georgios Niklitsiotis (Greek: Γεώργιος Νικλητσιώτης; born 23 March 1991) is a Greek professional footballer who plays as an attacking midfielder.

== Club career ==
Niklitsiotis started his football steps from Olympiacos Academy and was promoted to Olympiacos Reserve squad (U-21) the season 2007–2008. He gained his first professional cap against Larissa, on 12 April 2009. He played for 52 minutes before Luciano Galletti replaced him.

== International career ==
Niklitsiotis was a member of the Greece U-19 national team.

He was part of the youth team that went to Dubai to compete for the first Emirates Airlines football 7's exhibition event. He scored a host of goals and lead Olympiakos to the professional cup and was named player of the tournament.

== Honours ==
- Super League Greece: 2008–09
