= Brana Ilić =

Serbian footballer

Personal information
- Full name: Brana Ilić
- Date of birth: 16 February 1985 (age 41)
- Place of birth: Golubinci, SFR Yugoslavia
- Height: 1.73 m (5 ft 8 in)
- Position: Forward

Youth career
- Jadran Golubinci
- 1997–2003: Zemun

Senior career*
Years	Team	Apps	(Gls)
2003–2006	Zemun	93	(14)
2007–2008	Rad	59	(16)
2009–2010	Partizan	33	(5)
2010–2011	Vojvodina	35	(13)
2012	Aktobe	10	(3)
2012–2016	PAS Giannina	127	(26)
2016–2017	Aris Thessaloniki	31	(8)
2017–2019	Kisvárda	65	(14)
2019–2021	Inđija	49	(3)
2021	Železničar Pančevo	18	(7)
2022	Feniks		
2022–2025	Sloven Ruma	35	(3)

International career
2011	Serbia	1	(0)
- * Club domestic league appearances and goals as of 4 May 2025

Brana Ilić (Serbian Cyrillic: Брана Илић; born 16 February 1985) is a Serbian professional footballer who plays as a forward.

== Club career ==
=== Zemun and Rad ===
Ilić made his first senior appearances with Zemun in the 2003–04 First League of Serbia and Montenegro. He quickly established himself as a first-team regular, scoring four goals in 23 games. During his time at Zemun, Ilić amassed a total of 93 league appearances and scored 14 goals.

In the 2007 winter transfer window, Ilić moved to Serbian First League club Rad, spending there the next two years. He helped them win promotion to the Serbian SuperLiga in 2008.

=== Partizan and Vojvodina ===
On 9 January 2009, it was announced that Ilić signed a three-and-a-half-year contract with Partizan. He made his competitive debut for the club on 14 March, coming on as a late second-half substitute for Lamine Diarra in a 2–0 home league victory over Čukarički. Four days later, in his second appearance for Partizan, Ilić scored his first goal for the club, giving his team a 1–0 away win against Jagodina.

On 1 July 2010, it was announced that Ilić signed a one plus one-year contract with Vojvodina. He made 44 appearances across all competitions and scored 15 goals for the club, before leaving Novi Sad in the 2012 winter transfer window.

=== Kazakhstan, Greece and Hungary ===
In March 2012, Ilić moved abroad to Kazakhstan and signed with Aktobe. He made 10 appearances and scored three goals in the first half of the 2012 Kazakhstan Premier League, before leaving the club during the summer transfer window.

In the summer of 2012, Ilić joined Super League Greece side PAS Giannina. He made his first appearance for the club on 25 August, playing the full 90 minutes in a 0–0 home league draw with Platanias. On 7 October, Ilić scored his first goal for PAS Giannina in a 1–2 home loss to Panionios. He finished his debut season as the club's top scorer with 11 goals (10 in the league). During his four-year tenure at PAS Giannina, Ilić amassed 138 competitive appearances and scored 28 goals for the club.

On 2 August 2016, Ilić signed with Football League club Aris Thessaloniki on a two-year contract plus one-year extension. He netted his first goals for the side on 18 December, scoring a brace in a 3–2 win over Trikala. Eventually, Ilić left Aris Thessaloniki after just one season.

After five years in Greece, Ilić moved to Hungary and joined Nemzeti Bajnokság II club Kisvárda in July 2017. He helped them gain promotion to the Nemzeti Bajnokság I in his debut season, contributing with 10 goals in 35 appearances.

== International career ==
On 18 March 2011, Ilić received his first call-up to the Serbia national team for their UEFA Euro 2012 qualifiers against Northern Ireland and Estonia, but remained unused in both matches. He eventually made his debut in a friendly match against South Korea on 3 June 2011.

== Career statistics ==
=== Club ===
As of 3 December 2021

Appearances and goals by club, season and competition
Club	Season	League			Cup		Continental		Other		Total	
Club	Season	Division	Apps	Goals	Apps	Goals	Apps	Goals	Apps	Goals	Apps	Goals
Zemun	2003–04	First League of Serbia and Montenegro	23	4	2	0	—		—		25	4
Zemun	2004–05	First League of Serbia and Montenegro	28	7	1	0	—		—		29	7
Zemun	2005–06	First League of Serbia and Montenegro	27	2	2	0	—		—		29	2
Zemun	2006–07	Serbian SuperLiga	15	1	1	0	—		—		16	1
Zemun	Total		93	14	6	0	—		—		99	14
Rad	2006–07	Serbian First League	16	9	0	0	—		2 (Note: Appearances in Promotion/relegation playoffs)	0	18	9
Rad	2007–08	Serbian First League	29	6	1	0	—		4	2	34	8
Rad	2008–09	Serbian SuperLiga	14	1	2	0	—		—		16	1
Rad	Total		59	16	3	0	—		6	2	68	18
Partizan	2008–09	Serbian SuperLiga	11	2	2	0	0	0	—		13	2
Partizan	2009–10	Serbian SuperLiga	22	3	2	0	9	3	—		33	6
Partizan	Total		33	5	4	0	9	3	—		46	8
Vojvodina	2010–11	Serbian SuperLiga	22	6	4	0	—		—		26	6
Vojvodina	2011–12	Serbian SuperLiga	13	7	3	1	2	1	—		18	9
Vojvodina	Total		35	13	7	1	2	1	—		44	15
Aktobe	2012	Kazakhstan Premier League	10	3	0	0	0	0	—		10	3
PAS Giannina	2012–13	Super League Greece	35	10	4	1	—		—		39	11
PAS Giannina	2013–14	Super League Greece	34	5	2	0	—		—		36	5
PAS Giannina	2014–15	Super League Greece	31	7	2	1	—		—		33	8
PAS Giannina	2015–16	Super League Greece	27	4	3	0	—		—		30	4
PAS Giannina	Total		127	26	11	2	—		—		138	28
Aris Thessaloniki	2016–17	Football League (Greece)	31	8	0	0	—		—		31	8
Kisvárda	2017–18	Nemzeti Bajnokság II	35	10	2	0	—		—		37	10
Kisvárda	2018–19	Nemzeti Bajnokság I	30	4	5	2	—		—		35	6
Kisvárda	Total		65	14	7	2	—		—		72	16
Inđija	2019–20	Serbian SuperLiga	26	3	1	0	—		—		27	3
Inđija	2020–21	Serbian SuperLiga	23	0	0	0	—		—		23	0
Inđija	Total		49	3	1	0	—		—		50	3
Career total			502	102	39	5	11	4	6	2	558	113

=== International ===
Appearances and goals by national team and year
National team	Year	Apps	Goals
Serbia	2011	1	0
Total		1	0

== Honours ==
Partizan

- Serbian SuperLiga: 2008–09, 2009–10
- Serbian Cup: 2008–09

Individual

- Top Assist Super League Greece Runner-Up: 2014–15 (10 Goals with PAS Giannina)
