= Pastida =

Pastida Παστίδα
- Community
- Location within Greece
- Coordinates: 36°23′N 28°8′E
- Country: Greece
- Administrative region: South Aegean
- Regional unit: Rhodes
- Municipality: Rhodes
- Municipal unit: Petaloudes

Population (2021)
  - Community: 3,643
- Time zone: UTC+2 (EET)
  - Summer (DST): UTC+3 (EEST)

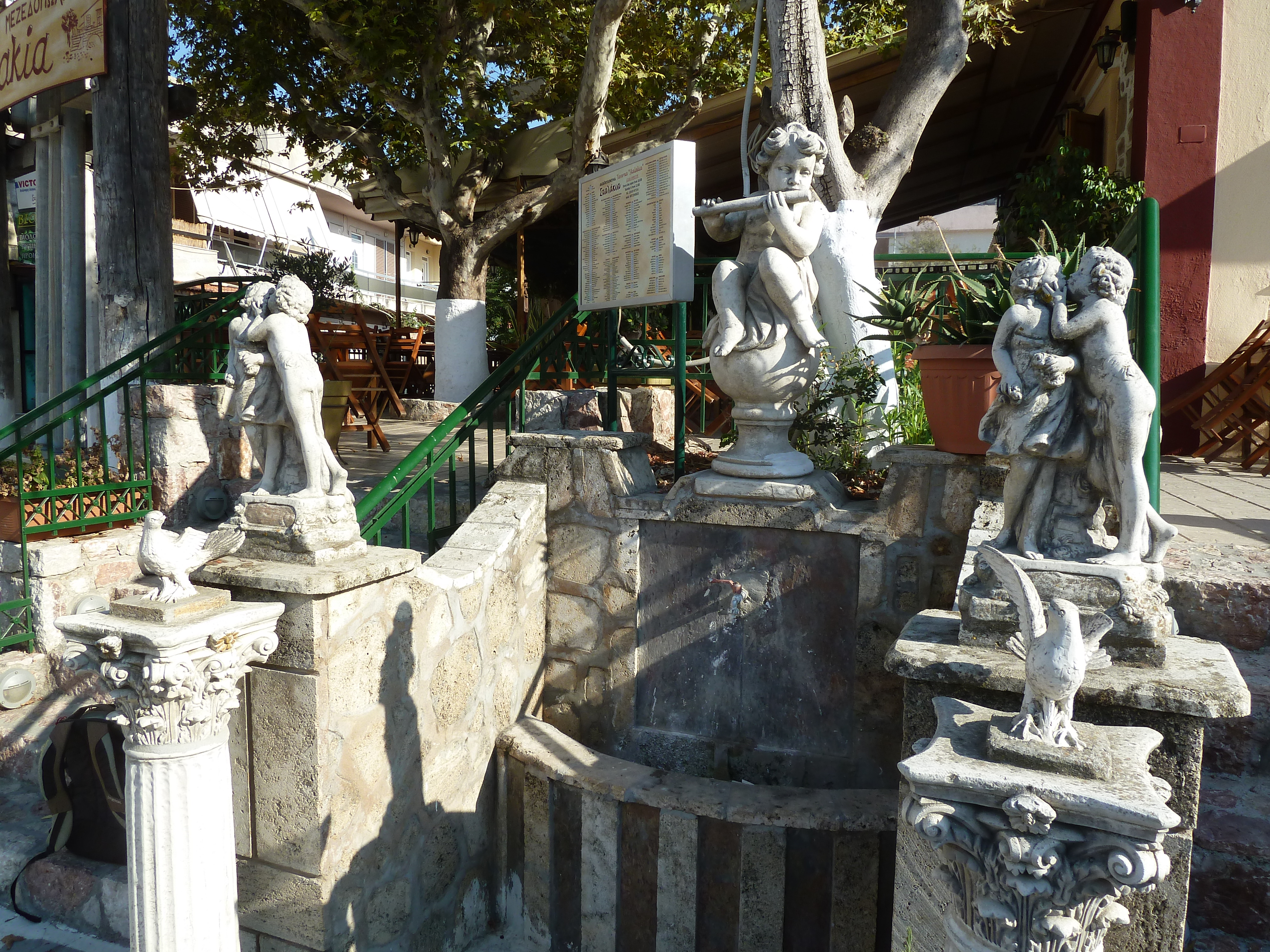
Pastida, Rhodes, Greece.

Pastida (Greek: Παστίδα) is a village on the Greek island of Rhodes. It is located slightly inland from the west coast on the northern tip of Rhodes, 5 miles from Trianta and 10 miles from Rhodes Town, on the foot of mount Philerimos. In Latin, the name of the village means "castle". It is a part of the municipal unit of Petaloudes.
