= Nikos Babaniotis =

Greek footballer (born 1989)

Personal information
- Full name: Nikolaos Babaniotis
- Date of birth: 28 June 1989 (age 37)
- Place of birth: Athens, Greece
- Height: 1.84 m (6 ft 1/2 in)
- Position: Goalkeeper

Senior career*
Years	Team	Apps	(Gls)
2006–2007	Akratitos	31	(0)
2007–2012	Panetolikos	57	(0)
2012–2013	PAS Giannina	2	(0)
2013–2014	Ionikos	19	(0)
2015–	Acharnaikos	5	(0)

International career
2007–2008	Greece U19	6	(0)
2009	Greece U-21	4	(0)
- * Club domestic league appearances and goals as of 00:15, 17 April 2016 (UTC)

Nikos Babaniotis (Greek: Νίκος Μπαμπανιώτης; born 28 June 1989) is a Greek footballer who plays for Acharnaikos F.C. as a goalkeeper.

== International caps ==
Babaniotis has been capped with the Greece national under-19 football team. He was a starter in all of Greece's games during the 2008 UEFA European Under-19 Football Championship, forcing Liverpool F.C. keeper Dean Bouzanis, who had been expected to start, to the bench. In 2009, he was called up to the Greece national under-21 football team, by coach Nikos Nioplias.
