= Theodoros Berios =

Greek professional footballer

Personal information
- Full name: Theodoros Berios
- Date of birth: 21 March 1989 (age 37)
- Place of birth: Athens, Greece
- Height: 1.91 m (6 ft 3 in)
- Position: Centre-back

Senior career*
Years	Team	Apps	(Gls)
2004–2006	Οlympiacos Ζacharo		
2006–2007	Doxa Megalopolis	30	(5)
2007–2008	Saronikos Aiginis	30	(5)
2008–2009	Thiva	30	(6)
2009–2010	Ionikos	29	(1)
2010–2011	Ilioupoli	22	(0)
2011	Vyzas	3	(0)
2012	Ethnikos Asteras	0	(0)
2012	FC Zenit Čáslav	7	(1)
2012–2018	PAS Giannina	96	(2)
2018–2020	Kisvárda	40	(0)
2020–2021	Nea Salamis Famagusta	0	(0)
2021–2022	Ermis Aradippou		
2022–	Kalamata	0	(0)
- * Club domestic league appearances and goals as of 13 June 2020

Theodoros Berios (Greek: Θεόδωρος Μπέριος; born 21 March 1989) is a Greek professional footballer who plays as a centre-back.

== Career ==
Berios began playing professional football at a young age, and by 2006 at the age of 17 was a regular for the Greek U17 team and for Doxa Megalopolis. He then moved to Saronikos Aiginis, and by 2008 was playing at Thiva and for the Greek U19 team. Berios in 2009 was bought by Ionikos.

He has built a reputation in Greece as a centre-back.

On 29 June 2018, Berios signed with Kisvárda.
