= Petros Topouzis =

Greek footballer

Personal information
- Date of birth: 12 July 1991 (age 35)
- Place of birth: Katerini, Greece
- Height: 1.93 m (6 ft 4 in)
- Position: Striker

Team information
- Current team: Pefki

Senior career*
Years	Team	Apps	(Gls)
2008–2010	Veria	9	(1)
2010–2011	Kozani	24	(6)
2011–2012	Doxa Drama	6	(0)
2012	Tyrnavos 2005	5	(0)
2012–2013	PAS Giannina	0	(0)
2013	→ Anagennisi Epanomi (loan)	21	(2)
2013–2014	Pefki		
2014	Olympia Hradec Králové		
- * Club domestic league appearances and goals as of 1 July 2014

Petros Topouzis (Greek: Πέτρος Τοπούζης, born 12 July 1991) is a Greek footballer.
