= 2016–17 PAS Giannina F.C. season =

PAS Giannina
2016–17 season
- Chairman: Giorgos Christovasilis
- Manager: Giannis Petrakis
- Stadium: Zosimades Stadium, Ioannina
- Super League: 9th
- Greek Cup: Round of 16; eliminated by Platanias
- UEFA Europa League: Third qualifying round; eliminated by AZ Alkmaar
- Top goalscorer: League: Pedro Pérez Conde; 13 goals All: Pedro Pérez Conde; 14 goals
- Highest home attendance: 4009; Olympiacos
- Lowest home attendance: 1502; Panionios
- Average home league attendance: 2243
Home colours	Away colours	Third colours

The 2016–17 season is PAS Giannina's 6th consecutive season in the Super League Greece and their 51st year in existence. They also took part in the UEFA Europa League (Second qualifying round). PAS Giannina qualified for the third qualifying round after beating Norwegian club Odd, they eventually disqualified, after losing to Dutch club AZ. It was the first time that PAS Giannina participated in the qualification process of a European competition organised by UEFA (PAS Giannina had previously participated in the Balkan Cup).

== Players ==
No.	Name	Nationality	Position(s)	Place of birth	Date of birth (Age)	Signed from	Notes
Goalkeepers
1	Alexandros Paschalakis	(Greece)	GK	Athens, Greece	28 July 1989 (27)	(Greece) Panthrakikos	
12	Kostas Peristeridis	(Greece)	GK	Chania, Crete, Greece	24 January 1991 (25)	(Greece) Platanias	
13	Nikolaos Koliofoukas	(Greece)	GK	Ioannina, Greece	11 September 1996 (19)	(Greece) Thesprotos	
Defenders
2	Michalis Boukouvalas	(Greece)	RB	Agrinio, Greece	14 January 1988 (28)	(Greece) Iraklis	
4	Thodoris Berios	(Greece)	CB	Athens, Greece	21 March 1989 (27)	(Czech Republic) Čáslav	
6	Alexios Michail (C)	(Greece)	CB	Ioannina, Greece	18 August 1986 (29)	(Greece) Panserraikos	
8	Themistoklis Tzimopoulos (VC2)	(New Zealand) (Greece)	CB	Kozani, Greece	20 November 1985 (30)	(Greece) Ethnikos Asteras	
17	David López Nadales	(Spain)	LB	Zaragoza, Aragon, Spain	22 January 1986 (30)	(Romania) Săgeata Năvodari	
20	Nikos Karanikas	(Greece)	RB	Larissa, Greece	4 March 1992 (24)	(Greece) AEL	
23	Leonardo Koutris	(Greece) (Brazil)	LB	Rhodes, Greece	23 July 1995 (21)	(Greece) Ergotelis	
42	Konstantinos Mavropanos	(Greece)	CB	Athens, Greece	11 December 1997 (18)	(Greece) Apollon Smyrnis Academy	
44	Apostolos Skondras	(Greece)	CB	Athens, Greece	29 December 1988 (27)	(Greece) AEL	
Midfielders
3	Andi Lila (VC3)	(Albania)	DM	Kavajë, Albania	12 February 1986 (30)	(Albania) KF Tirana	
5	Iraklis Garoufalias	(Greece)	DM / CM	Athens, Greece	1 May 1993 (23)	(Greece) Fostiras	
7	Evripidis Giakos	(Greece)	CM / CF	Ioannina, Greece	9 April 1991 (25)	(Greece) Doxa Kranoula	
11	Noé Acosta (VC4)	(Spain)	CM / LW	Guadalajara, Castilla-La Mancha, Spain	10 December 1983 (32)	(Greece) Olympiacos Volos	
18	Christos Donis	(Greece)	CM	Athens, Greece	9 October 1994 (21)	(Greece) Panathinaikos	on loan
22	Chrysovalantis Kozoronis	(Greece)	DM	Heraklion, Crete, Greece	3 August 1992 (24)	(Greece) Ergotelis	
88	Alexandros Nikolias	(Greece)	CM	Kymi, Euboea, Greece	23 July 1994 (22)	(Greece) Olympiacos Volos	
98	Alexandros Masouras	(Greece)	DM	Ioannina, Greece	21 March 1998 (18)	(Greece) PAS Giannina Academy	
Forwards
9	Pedro Pérez Conde	(Spain)	CF	Villafranca de Córdoba, Andalusia, Spain	26 July 1988 (28)	(Spain) (Extremadura) Mérida AD	
10	Jairo	(Brazil)	LW	Rio de Janeiro, Brazil	6 May 1992 (24)	(Greece) PAOK	on loan
14	Dimitrios Ferfelis	(Greece) (Germany)	CF	Delmenhorst, Germany	5 April 1993 (23)	(Netherlands) PEC Zwolle	
33	Higor Vidal	(Brazil)	CF	Campo Largo, Paraná, Brazil	26 September 1996 (19)	(Brazil) Londrina Esporte Clube	
34	Nikos Korovesis	(Greece)	LW	Chalcis, Greece	10 August 1991 (25)	(Greece) PAOK	on loan
55	Enes Dolovac	(Serbia)	LW	Novi Pazar, Serbia	1 February 1999 (17)	(Serbia) Novi Pazar Academy	
93	Christopher Maboulou	(Republic of the Congo) (France)	RW	Montfermeil, France	19 March 1990 (26)	(France) (Corsica) SC Bastia	

=== International players ===
- (Albania) Andi Lila
- (Greece) Michalis Boukouvalas
- (Greece) Kostas Peristeridis (Men's & U-19)
- (Greece) Christos Donis (U-21)
- (Greece) Leonardo Koutris (U-21)
- (New Zealand) Themistoklis Tzimopoulos
- (Serbia) Enes Dolovac (U-17)

=== Foreign players ===
EU Nationals

- (Spain) (Europe) Noé Acosta
- (Spain) (Europe) David López Nadales
- (Spain) (Europe) Pedro Pérez Conde

EU Nationals (Dual Citizenship)

- (Republic of the Congo) (France) (Europe) Christopher Maboulou
- (New Zealand) (Greece) (Europe) Themistoklis Tzimopoulos
- (Brazil) (Greece) (Europe) Leonardo Koutris
- (Greece) (Germany) (Europe) Dimitrios Ferfelis

Non-EU Nationals

- (Albania) Andi Lila
- (Brazil) Jairo
- (Brazil) Higor Vidal
- (Serbia) Enes Dolovac

== Personnel ==
=== Management ===
Position	Staff
Majority Owner	Giorgos Christovasilis
President and CEO	Giorgos Christovasilis
Director of Football	Dimitris Niarchakos
Director of Office	Alekos Potsis
Head of Ticket Department	Andreas Potsis

=== Coaching staff ===
Position	Name
Head coach	Giannis Petrakis
Assistant coach	Giorgos Georgoulopoulos (until 3 February 2017) Giannis Taousianis (from 3 February 2017)
Fitness coach	Vasilis Alexiou
Goalkeepers Coach	Christos Tseliopoulos

=== medical staff ===
Position	Name
Head doctor	Stavros Restanis
Exercise Physiology-Nutritionist	Athanasios Tziamourtas
Physio	Filippos Skordos
Physio	Giannis Balaouras

=== Academy ===
Position	Name
Head of Youth Development	Giorgos Georgoulopoulos
Head coach U-20	Christos Agelis
Head coach U-17	Nikos Badimas
Head coach U-15	Anastasios Anthimiadis
Scout	Dimitris Stoukas (from 13 March 2017)

== Transfers and loans ==
=== Transfers in ===
Note: Flags indicate national team as defined under FIFA eligibility rules; some limited exceptions apply. Players may hold more than one non-FIFA nationality.

No.	Pos.	Nation	Player
—	DF	GRE	Michalis Boukouvalas (from (Greece) Iraklis)
—	MF	CGO	Christopher Maboulou (from (France) (Corsica) SC Bastia)
—	MF	SRB	Enes Dolovac (from (Serbia) FK Novi Pazar (U-19))
—	FW	ESP	Pedro Pérez Conde (from (Spain) (Extremadura) Mérida AD)
—	MF	GRE	Christos Donis (on loan from (Greece) Panathinaikos)
—	FW	BRA	Jairo (on loan from (Greece) PAOK)
—	FW	BRA	Higor Vidal (from (Brazil) Londrina EC)
—	FW	GRE	Nikos Korovesis (on loan from (Greece) PAOK)

=== Transfers out ===
Note: Flags indicate national team as defined under FIFA eligibility rules; some limited exceptions apply. Players may hold more than one non-FIFA nationality.

No.	Pos.	Nation	Player
9	FW	SRB	Brana Ilić (released and transfer to (Greece) Aris)
19	MF	GRE	Antonis Iliadis (released and transfer to (Greece) Platanias)
21	MF	GRE	Stavros Tsoukalas (transfer to (Greece) Asteras Tripolis)
23	DF	SLO	Andraž Struna (released)
33	FW	GRE	Michalis Manias (released and transfer to (Belgium) Westerlo)
49	MF	GRE	Giannis Ioannou (released)
14	FW	GRE	Dimitrios Ferfelis (transfer to (Greece) PAS Lamia)
18	MF	GRE	Christos Donis (loan return to Panathinaikos)

For recent transfers, see List of Greek football transfers summer 2016

For recent transfers, see List of Greek football transfers winter 2016–17

== Friendlies ==
Win Draw Loss Upcoming fixture

5 July 2016 Friendly	APOEL	2–1	PAS Giannina	Dasaki Achnas, Cyprus
19:00	Sotiriou 3', 13'	Report	Ferfelis 4'	Stadium: Dasaki Stadium; Attendance: unknown Referee: unknown

31 July 2016 Friendly	PAS Giannina	0–1	Kassiopi	Ioannina, Greece
18:00		Report	Doualla 38'	Stadium: Zosimades Stadium; Attendance: unknown Referee: Christos Mitsios

8 August 2016 Friendly	PAS Giannina	1–0	Panetolikos F.C.	Ioannina, Greece
18:30	Maboulou 63'	Report		Stadium: Zosimades Stadium; Attendance: unknown Referee: Alexandros Katsikogiannis

13 August 2016 Friendly	Hoffenheim	7–0	PAS Giannina	Sinsheim, Germany
13:00	Szalai 18', 47'; Vargas 35'; Demirbay 36'; Zuber 58'; Elyounoussi 68'; Schmid 82'	Report		Stadium: Dietmar-Hopp-Stadion; Attendance: unknown Referee: unknown

21 August 2016 Friendly	PAS Giannina	0–0	Veria F.C.	Ioannina, Greece
18:30		Report		Stadium: Zosimades Stadium; Attendance: unknown Referee: Christos Mitsios

27 August 2016 Friendly	PAS Giannina	3–3	AEL	Ioannina, Greece
18:00	Noé Acosta 19' (pen.); Higor Vidal 69'; Maboulou 75'	Report	Nazlidis 26' (pen.), 42'; Varela 34' (pen.)	Stadium: Zosimades Stadium; Attendance: unknown Referee: Alexandros Katsikogiannis

2 September 2016 Friendly	PAS Giannina	3–0	Trikala F.C.	Ioannina, Greece
18:00	Pedro Conde 5'; Nadales 36'; Jairo 58'	Report		Stadium: Zosimades Stadium; Attendance: unknown Referee: Konstantinos Balatsoukas

10 May 2017 Friendly	Tilikratis F.C.	1–2	PAS Giannina	Lefkada, Greece
17:00	Bali 62'	Report	Lila 38' (pen.), 50'	Stadium: Lefkada Stadium; Attendance: unknown Referee: Ziogas
Note: The match was interrupted because Koliofoukas' serious injury.

== Competitions ==
Win Draw Loss Upcoming fixture

=== Super League Greece ===
==== League table ====
Pos	Team	Pld	W	D	L	GF	GA	GD	Pts
7	Platanias	30	11	9	10	34	38	−4	42
8	Atromitos	30	11	6	13	29	38	−9	39
9	PAS Giannina	30	8	12	10	30	37	−7	36
10	Kerkyra	30	8	8	14	22	43	−21	32
11	Panetolikos	30	8	7	15	29	40	−11	31

Source: Super League Greece
Rules for classification: 1) Points; 2) Head-to-head points; 3) Head-to-head goal difference; 4) Goals scored; 5) Goals against; 6) Play-offs (neutral ground); 7) Draw.
(Note: Criteria 6 is only used if needed to decide champion, teams for relegation or teams for UEFA competitions).

==== Results summary ====
Overall								Home						Away					
Pld	W	D	L	GF	GA	GD	Pts	W	D	L	GF	GA	GD	W	D	L	GF	GA	GD
30	8	12	10	30	37	−7	36	5	6	4	16	10	+6	3	6	6	14	27	−13

==== Fixtures ====
Win Draw Loss Postponed

5 January 2017 1	Panionios	1-1	PAS Giannina	Nea Smyrni
15:00	Ansarifard 43'	Report	Garoufalias (yellow card) 33'; Tzimopoulos 79'; Skondras (yellow card) 80'; Jairo (yellow card) 90+1'; Higor Vidal (yellow card) 90+4'	Stadium: Nea Smyrni Stadium; Attendance: 880; Referee: Emanouil Skoulas

8 January 2017 2	PAOK	0-1	PAS Giannina	Thessaloniki
15:00		Report	Tzimopoulos 16'; Acosta (yellow card) 20'; Paschalakis (yellow card) 90'	Stadium: Toumba Stadium; Attendance: 2906; Referee: Anastasios Papapetrou

11 September 2016 3	PAS Giannina	3–0	Atromitos	Ioannina
18:15	Acosta 10' (pen.); Conde 41', 57'; Giakos (yellow card) 44'; Paschalakis (yellow card) 76'	Report	Vasiliou (yellow card) 17'	Stadium: Zosimades Stadium; Attendance: 2116; Referee: Aristidis Vatsios

18 September 2016 4	Panathinaikos	4–0	PAS Giannina	Athens
16:00	Berg 38', 76'; Coulibaly (yellow card) 50'; Lod 54'; Moledo (yellow card) 73'; Leto 88'	Report	Paschalakis (red card) 22'; Berios (yellow card) 73'	Stadium: Leoforos Stadium; Attendance: 7142; Referee: Spyros Selimos

24 September 2016 5	PAS Giannina	0–0	Platanias	Ioannina
16:00	Lila (yellow card) 25' (yellow-red card) 89'; Boukouvalas (yellow card) 75'; Donis (yellow card) 88'	Report	Gnjatić (yellow card) 81'	Stadium: Zosimades Stadium; Attendance: 1977; Referee: Nikos Poulimas

1 October 2016 6	Kassiopi	0–1	PAS Giannina	Kerkyra
16:00	Gomes (yellow card) 37'	Report	Tzimopoulos (yellow card) 49'; Boukouvalas (yellow card) 57'; Skondras (yellow card) 59'; Higor Vidal 80'	Stadium: Kerkyra Stadium; Attendance: 1030; Referee: Georgios Giannoulakis (Heraklion)

23 November 2016 7 ^{[info]}	PAS Giannina	0-0	Levadiakos	Ioannina
17:15	Koutris (yellow card) 73'; Jairo (yellow card) 87'	Report	Karaboué (yellow card) 39'; Mantzios (yellow card) 45+3'	Stadium: Zosimades Stadium; Attendance: 1516; Referee: Ioannis Papadopoulos

23 October 2016 8	PAS Giannina	4-0	AEL	Ioannina
18:15	Conde 10', 52', 74'; Giakos 27'; Kozoronis (yellow card) 32'; Conde (yellow card) 44'	Report	Andoni (yellow card) 39'	Stadium: Zosimades Stadium; Attendance: 2431; Referee: Dimitrios Karantonis

31 October 2016 9	Panetolikos	1-2	PAS Giannina	Agrinio
19:30	Rodrigues (yellow card) 12'; Ferreyra 42'; Ledesma (yellow card) 82'	Report	Maboulou 69', 80'; Garoufalias (yellow card) 78'; Jairo (yellow card) 90'	Stadium: Panetolikos Stadium; Attendance: 2546; Referee: Ananias Fotiadis

5 November 2016 10	PAS Giannina	1-2	Asteras Tripolis	Ioannina
15:00	Jairo 63'; Lila (yellow card) 82'; Karanikas (yellow card) 90'	Report	Dimoutsos (yellow card) 21'; Ilias Evangelou (yellow card) 45+1'; Fariña 72'; Mazza 77'; Kaltsas (yellow card) 90+1'	Stadium: Zosimades Stadium; Attendance: 2455; Referee: Anastasios Papapetrou

15 January 2017 11	Xanthi	2-0	PAS Giannina	Xanthi
15:00	Soltani 22'; Lucas (yellow card) 69'; Baxevanidis (yellow card) 80'; Younés 88'	Report	Kozoronis (yellow card) 56'	Stadium: Xanthi Arena; Attendance: 795; Referee: Triantafillos Tikas

26 November 2016 12	PAS Giannina	2-0	Veria	Ioannina
15:00	Conde 39'; Lila (yellow card) 49'; Jairo (yellow card) 61'; Kozoronis 90+2'	Report	Sissoko (yellow card) 15'; Arce (yellow card) 23'; Kapetanos (red card) 59'	Stadium: Zosimades Stadium; Attendance: 1722; Referee: Nikolaos Poulimas

5 December 2016 13	Iraklis	2-1	PAS Giannina	Thessaloniki
19:30	Perrone 14'; Kouros (yellow card) 66'; Perrone (yellow card) 73'; Angelopoulos 88'	Report	Kozoronis 7'; Koutris (yellow card) 50'; Giakos (yellow card) 75'	Stadium: Kaftanzoglio Stadium; Attendance: 330; Referee: Dimitrios Karantonis

12 December 2016 14	PAS Giannina	0-2	Olympiacos	Ioannina
19:30	Lila (yellow card) 38' (yellow-red card) 41'; Peristeridis (yellow card) 49'	Report	Martins (yellow card) 29'; Figueiras (yellow card) 50'; Milivojević (yellow card) 66'; Cardozo 68'; Sebá 90+2'	Stadium: Zosimades Stadium; Attendance: 4009; Referee: Anastasios Papapetrou

19 December 2016 15	AEK Athens	1-1	PAS Giannina	Athens
19:30	Aravidis (red card) 10'; Patito (yellow card) 55'; Pekhart 67'; Vilà (yellow card) 90+1'	Report	Berios (yellow card) 10'; Boukouvalas (yellow card) 30'; Kozoronis (yellow card) 34'; Garoufalias (yellow card) 45'; Peristeridis (yellow card) 67'; Michail (yellow card) 81'; Maboulou 90+4'	Stadium: OAKA; Attendance: 4069; Referee: Triantafillos Tikas

18 January 2017 16	PAS Giannina	1-0	Panionios	Ioannina
15:00	Conde (yellow card) 14'; Michail 18'; Garoufalias (yellow card) 64'; Jairo (yellow card) 66'	Report	Shojaei (yellow card) 25'; Tapoko (yellow card) 84'	Stadium: Zosimades Stadium; Attendance: 1502; Referee: Praxitelis Zachariadis

23 January 2017 17	PAS Giannina	0-1	PAOK	Ioannina
19:30	Lila (yellow card) 30'; Conde (yellow card) 79'; Acosta (yellow card) 90+3'	Report	Shakhov (yellow card) 14'; Leovac 31'; Malezas (yellow card) 45'; Mystakidis (yellow card) 68'; Varela (yellow card) 79'; Charisis (yellow card) 88'	Stadium: Zosimades Stadium; Attendance: 3117; Referee: Christos Granas

29 January 2017 18	Atromitos	1-1	PAS Giannina	Athens
17:15	Le Tallec 60'; Kyriakidis (yellow card) 78'; Le Tallec (yellow card) 90'	Report	Koutris (yellow card) 44'; Lila (yellow card) 71'; Tzimopoulos (yellow card) 78'; Conde 90+5'	Stadium: Peristeri Stadium; Attendance: 693; Referee: Aggelos Euaggelou

4 February 2017 19	PAS Giannina	1-1	Panathinaikos	Ioannina
19:30	Conde 31'; Kozoronis (yellow card) 73'; Acosta (yellow card) 82'	Report	Thelander (yellow card) 45+2'; Berg 56'; Moledo (yellow card) 65'; Chatzigiovanis (yellow card) 85'	Stadium: Zosimades Stadium; Attendance: 3013; Referee: Athanasios Tzilos

12 February 2017 20	Platanias	3-3	PAS Giannina	Platanias
17:15	Giakoumakis 32'; Kargas 40'; Yaya (yellow card) 45'; Munafo (yellow card) 45+1'; Signevich 51'; Giakoumakis (yellow card) 86'	Report	Conde 9', 58'; Tzimopoulos 11'; Higor Vidal (yellow card) 14'; Kozoronis (yellow card) 56'; Koutris (yellow card) 62'	Stadium: Perivolia Municipal Stadium; Attendance: 1458; Referee: Alexandros Tsamouris

18 February 2017 21	PAS Giannina	1-0	Kassiopi	Ioannina
17:15	Conde 18' (pen.)	Report	Dimitrovski (yellow card) 23'; Zorbas (yellow card) 28'	Stadium: Zosimades Stadium; Attendance: 1813; Referee: Alexandros Aretopoulos

26 February 2017 22	Levadiakos	2-1	PAS Giannina	Livadeia
17:15	Karachalios (yellow card) 28'; Vasileiou 39'; Vouros (yellow card) 45+1'; Milhazes 57' (pen.); Vasileiou (yellow card) 78'	Report	Conde 23'; Nadales (yellow card) 41'; Tzimopoulos (yellow card) 54'; Koutris (yellow card) 56'	Stadium: Levadia Municipal Stadium; Attendance: 820; Referee: Anastasios Sidiropoulos

4 March 2017 23	AEL	1-1	PAS Giannina	Larissa
15:00	Jovanović 18'; Aganović (yellow card) 68'; Farkaš (yellow card) 88'	Report	Conde 41'; Koutris (yellow card) 90+2'	Stadium: AEL FC Arena; Attendance: 1536; Referee: Christos Granas

11 March 2017 24	PAS Giannina	0-0	Panetolikos	Ioannina
15:00	Jairo (yellow card) 27'; Tzimopoulos (yellow card) 31'; Lila (yellow card) 60'; Higor Vidal (yellow card) 81'; Michail (yellow card) 89'	Report	Rocha (yellow card) 14'; Marcos Paulo (yellow card) 59'; Papadopoulos (yellow card) 89'	Stadium: Zosimades Stadium; Attendance: 1741; Referee: Georgios Kizas

19 March 2017 25	Asteras Tripolis	1-1	PAS Giannina	Tripoli
17:15	Hayduchyk (yellow card) 19'; Manias 70'	Report	Jairo 27'; Lila (yellow card) 45+1'; Boukouvalas (yellow card) 53'; Acosta (yellow card) 67'; Berios (yellow card) 80'; Jairo (yellow card) 89'	Stadium: Theodoros Kolokotronis Stadium; Attendance: 1416; Referee: Aggelos Euaggelou

1 April 2017 26	PAS Giannina	1-1	Xanthi	Ioannina
15:00	Conde (yellow card) 33'; Jairo 90+1'	Report	Baxevanidis (yellow card) 38'; Vasilakakis (yellow card) 45+1'; Soltani (yellow card) 55'; Vasilakakis 60'; Lisgaras (yellow card) 78' (yellow-red card) 90+4'; Wallace (yellow card) 86'	Stadium: Zosimades Stadium; Attendance: 1553; Referee: Dimitris Styliaras

5 April 2017 27	Veria	3-0	PAS Giannina	Veria
17:15	Kapetanos 20'; Sarpong 36'; Balafas (yellow card) 63' (yellow-red card) 90+4'; Soulé (yellow card) 88'; Soulé 90+3'	Report	Lila (yellow card) 40'	Stadium: Veria Stadium; Attendance: 366; Referee: Triantafillos Tikas

9 April 2017 28	PAS Giannina	1-2	Iraklis	Ioannina
19:00	Garoufalias (yellow card) 21'; Giakos (yellow card) 51'; Berios (yellow card) 76'; Higor Vidal 83'	Report	Bastakos 11'; Saramantas (yellow card) 44'; Donis 47'; Donis (yellow card) 47' (yellow-red card) 90+6'; Leozinho (yellow card) 51'; Karagounis (yellow card) 78'; Angelopoulos (yellow card) 85'; Giannikoglou (yellow card) 90+4'	Stadium: Zosimades Stadium; Attendance: 1664; Referee: Aristeidis Vatsios

23 April 2017 29	Olympiacos	5-0	PAS Giannina	Piraeus
19:00	Marin 21'; Da Costa 24'; De La Bella 29', 71'; Domínguez 81' (pen.)	Report	Berios (yellow card) 32'	Stadium: Karaiskakis Stadium; Attendance: 20818; Referee: Athanasios Tzilos

30 April 2017 30	PAS Giannina	1-1	AEK Athens	Ioannina
19:00	Lila 38'	Report	Vargas (yellow card) 45'; Patito 80'	Stadium: Zosimades Stadium; Attendance: 3019; Referee: Konstantinos Kotsanis

(Source:)

The match was postponed due to the 5.3 R Ioannina earthquake that occurred on 16 October.

=== Greek Football Cup ===
==== Second round ====
Pos	Team	Pld	W	D	L	GF	GA	GD	Pts	Qualification	PAS	XAN	AGR	KAL
1	PAS Giannina	3	3	0	0	5	1	+4	9	Round of 16		1–0	—	—
2	Xanthi	3	1	1	1	4	3	+1	4	Round of 16	—		—	3–1
3	Agrotikos Asteras	3	1	1	1	3	3	0	4		0–1	1–1		—
4	AEL Kalloni	3	0	0	3	3	8	−5	0		1–3	—	1–2	

Source: epo.gr

===== Group D =====
26 October 2016 1	PAS Giannina	1-0	Xanthi	Ioannina
15:00	Maboulou 15'; Koutris (yellow card) 36'; Nadales (yellow card) 88'; Skondras (yellow card) 90+3'	Report Report	Baxevanidis (yellow card) 53'; Younés (yellow card) 69'; Papageorgiou (yellow card) 85'; Ranos (yellow card) 90+4'	Stadium: Zosimades Stadium; Referee: Ioannins Papadopoulos

29 November 2016 2	Agrotikos Asteras	0-1	PAS Giannina	Evosmos
15:00	Chatzis (yellow card) 57'	Report	Donis 40'; Karanikas (yellow card) 57'; Higor Vidal (yellow card) 65'	Stadium: Gipedo Evosmou; Referee: Evaggelos Kiotzenis

15 December 2016 3	AEL Kalloni	1-3	PAS Giannina	Mytilene
17:00	Pozatzidis (yellow card) 81'; Lambros Triantafyllou 83'	Report	Giakos 5'; Garoufalias 42'; Skondras 62'; Garoufalias (yellow card) 79'	Stadium: Mytilene Municipal Stadium; Referee: Spiros Michelis

==== Last 16 ====
26 January 2017 1	Platanias	1-0	PAS Giannina	Platanias
17:15	Pryndeta (yellow card) 13'; Llorente (yellow card) 45+1'; Apostolopoulos 49'	Report	Berios (yellow card) 14'; Kozoronis (yellow card) 79'	Stadium: Perivolia Municipal Stadium; Referee: Giorgos Blanas

1 February 2017 2	PAS Giannina	1-2 (a.e.t.)	Platanias	Ioannina
17:15	Higor Vidal (yellow card) 8'; Koutris (yellow card) 30'; Garoufalias (yellow card) 39'; Berios (red card) 65'; Jairo 84'	Report	Kargas (yellow card) 24'; Yaya (yellow card) 79'; Llorente 113' (pen.); Manousos 120'	Stadium: Zosimades Stadium; Referee: Ioannis Delfakis

=== UEFA Europa League ===
==== Second qualifying round ====
All times at EET

14 July 2016 First leg	PAS Giannina (Greece)	3–0	(Norway) Odd	Ioannina
21:00	Michail 7'; Berios (yellow card) 16'; Fonsi 31'; Karanikas (yellow card) 66'; Acosta 68'	Report	Eriksen (yellow card) 37'	Stadium: Zosimades Stadium; Attendance: 5,615; Referee: Glenn Nyberg (Sweden)

21 July 2016 Second leg	Odd (Norway)	3–1 (a.e.t.) (4–3 agg.)	(Greece) PAS Giannina	Skien
20:00	Nordkvelle 55' (pen.); Bentley 57'; Ruud 89'; Berge (yellow card) 97'	Report	Koutris 98'; Paschalakis (yellow card) 117'	Stadium: Skagerak Arena; Attendance: 3,184; Referee: Tomasz Musiał (Poland)

==== Third qualifying round ====
All times at EET

28 July 2016 First leg	AZ (Netherlands)	1–0	(Greece) PAS Giannina	Alkmaar
21:45	Luckassen 36'; Vlaar (yellow card) 79'	Report	Acosta (yellow card) 35'; Tzimopoulos (yellow card) 65'; Karanikas (yellow card) 77'	Stadium: AFAS Stadion; Attendance: 9,156; Referee: Mattias Gestranius (Finland)

4 August 2016 Second leg	PAS Giannina (Greece)	1–2 (1–3 agg.)	(Netherlands) AZ	Peristeri (Note: PAS Giannina played their third qualifying round home match at Peristeri Stadium, Peristeri, instead of their regular stadium Zosimades Stadium, Ioannina.)
21:00	Conde 9'; Kozoronis (yellow card) 18'; Berios (yellow card) 60'; Lila (yellow card) 62'	Report	Dabney 29'; Luckassen 36'; Overeem (yellow card) 45+2'	Stadium: Peristeri Stadium; Attendance: 3,373; Referee: Robert Schörgenhofer (Austria)

== Statistics ==
=== Appearances ===
No.	Pos.	Nat.	Name	Greek Super League	Greek Cup	Europa League	Total
No.	Pos.	Nat.	Name	Apps	Apps	Apps	Apps
1	GK	(Greece)	Alexandros Paschalakis	20	3	4	27
2	RB	(Greece)	Michalis Boukouvalas	18	3	0	21
3	DM	(Albania)	Andi Lila	18	0	4	22
4	CB	(Greece)	Thodoris Berios	22	3	4	29
5	DM / CM	(Greece)	Iraklis Garoufalias	15	5	0	20
6	CB	(Greece)	Alexios Michail	26	4	4	34
7	CM / CF	(Greece)	Evripidis Giakos	27	4	4	35
8	CB	(New Zealand) (Greece)	Themistoklis Tzimopoulos	23	0	4	27
9	CF	(Spain)	Pedro Pérez Conde	25	3	2	30
10	LW	(Brazil)	Jairo	26	3	0	29
11	CM / LW	(Spain)	Noé Acosta	24	2	4	30
12	GK	(Greece)	Kostas Peristeridis	11	2	0	13
13	GK	(Greece)	Nikolaos Koliofoukas	0	0	0	0
14	CF	(Greece) (Germany)	Dimitrios Ferfelis	1	1	3	5
17	LB	(Spain)	David López Nadales	22	4	4	30
18	CM	(Greece)	Christos Donis	3	3	4	10
20	RB	(Greece)	Nikos Karanikas	18	3	4	25
22	DM	(Greece)	Chrysovalantis Kozoronis	29	3	4	36
23	LB	(Greece) (Brazil)	Leonardo Koutris	28	3	2	33
33	CF	(Brazil)	Higor Vidal	15	4	0	19
34	LW	(Greece)	Nikos Korovesis	7	0	0	7
42	CB	(Greece)	Konstantinos Mavropanos	2	2	0	4
44	CB	(Greece)	Apostolos Skondras	13	4	2	19
55	LW	(Serbia)	Enes Dolovac	0	0	0	0
88	LW	(Greece)	Alexandros Nikolias	3	4	0	7
93	RW	(Republic of the Congo) (France)	Christopher Maboulou	22	2	3	27
98	DM	(Greece)	Alexandros Masouras	0	2	0	2

Super League Greece

=== Goalscorers ===
No.	Pos.	Nat.	Name	Greek Super League	Greek Cup	Europa League	Total
No.	Pos.	Nat.	Name	Goals	Goals	Goals	Goals
9	CF	(Spain)	Pedro Pérez Conde	13	0	1	14
93	RW	(Republic of the Congo) (France)	Christopher Maboulou	3	1	0	4
10	LW	(Brazil)	Jairo	3	1	0	4
8	CB	(New Zealand) (Greece)	Themistoklis Tzimopoulos	3	0	0	3
6	CB	(Greece)	Alexios Michail	1	0	1	2
11	CM / LW	(Spain)	Noé Acosta	1	0	1	2
22	DM	(Greece)	Chrysovalantis Kozoronis	2	0	0	2
33	CF	(Brazil)	Higor Vidal	2	0	0	2
7	CM / CF	(Greece)	Evripidis Giakos	1	1	0	2
3	DM	(Albania)	Andi Lila	1	0	0	1
17	LB	(Spain)	David López Nadales	0	0	1	1
18	CM	(Greece)	Christos Donis	0	1	0	1
23	LB	(Greece) (Brazil)	Leonardo Koutris	0	0	1	1
44	CB	(Greece)	Apostolos Skondras	0	1	0	1
5	DM / CM	(Greece)	Iraklis Garoufalias	0	1	0	1

Super League Greece

=== Disciplinary record ===
S	P	N	Name	Super League			Greek Cup			Europa League			Total		
S	P	N	Name	Yellow card	Yellow-red card	Red card	Yellow card	Yellow-red card	Red card	Yellow card	Yellow-red card	Red card	Yellow card	Yellow-red card	Red card
1	GK	(Greece)	Alexandros Paschalakis	2	0	1	0	0	0	1	0	0	3	0	1
2	RB	(Greece)	Michalis Boukouvalas	4	0	0	0	0	0	0	0	0	4	0	0
3	DM	(Albania)	Andi Lila	7	2	0	0	0	0	1	0	0	8	2	0
4	CB	(Greece)	Thodoris Berios	5	0	0	1	0	1	2	0	0	8	0	1
5	DM / CM	(Greece)	Iraklis Garoufalias	5	0	0	2	0	0	0	0	0	7	0	0
6	CB	(Greece)	Alexios Michail	2	0	0	0	0	0	0	0	0	2	0	0
7	CM / CF	(Greece)	Evripidis Giakos	3	0	0	0	0	0	0	0	0	3	0	0
8	CB	(New Zealand) (Greece)	Themistoklis Tzimopoulos	4	0	0	0	0	0	1	0	0	5	0	0
9	CF	(Spain)	Pedro Pérez Conde	4	0	0	0	0	0	0	0	0	4	0	0
10	LW	(Brazil)	Jairo	7	0	0	0	0	0	0	0	0	7	0	0
11	CM / LW	(Spain)	Noé Acosta	4	0	0	0	0	0	1	0	0	5	0	0
12	GK	(Greece)	Kostas Peristeridis	2	0	0	0	0	0	0	0	0	2	0	0
17	LB	(Spain)	David López Nadales	1	0	0	1	0	0	0	0	0	2	0	0
18	CM	(Greece)	Christos Donis	1	0	0	0	0	0	0	0	0	1	0	0
20	RB	(Greece)	Nikos Karanikas	1	0	0	1	0	0	2	0	0	4	0	0
22	DM	(Greece)	Chrysovalantis Kozoronis	5	0	0	1	0	0	1	0	0	7	0	0
23	LB	(Greece) (Brazil)	Leonardo Koutris	6	0	0	2	0	0	0	0	0	8	0	0
33	CF	(Brazil)	Higor Vidal	3	0	0	2	0	0	0	0	0	5	0	0
44	CB	(Greece)	Apostolos Skondras	2	0	0	1	0	0	0	0	0	3	0	0

=== Clean sheets ===
No.	Pos.	Nat.	Name	Greek Super League	Greek Cup	Europa League	Total
No.	Pos.	Nat.	Name	CS	CS	CS	CS
1	GK	(Greece)	Alexandros Paschalakis	6 (20)	2 (3)	1(4)	9 (27)
12	GK	(Greece)	Kostas Peristeridis	5 (11)	0 (2)	0 (0)	5 (13)
13	GK	(Greece)	Nikolaos Koliofoukas	0 (0)	0 (0)	0 (0)	0 (0)

=== Best goal and MVP awards winners ===
MD	MVP award	Best goal award
2	Alexandros Paschalakis	-
8	-	Evripidis Giakos
9	Christopher Maboulou	-
12	-	Chrysovalantis Kozoronis
18	-	Pedro Conde
20	-	Pedro Conde
21	Pedro Conde	-
23	-	Pedro Conde

=== Other awards ===
Super League Team of the Year

- Leonardo Koutris: 2016–17
