= List of Greek football transfers summer 2016 =

This is a list of Greek football transfers in the 2016 summer transfer window by club. Only clubs in the 2016–17 Super League Greece are included.

== Super League Greece ==
=== AEK Athens ===
In:

No.	Pos.	Nation	Player
1	GK	GRE	Vasilis Barkas (from Atromitos)
3	DF	URU	Juan Manuel Díaz (from (Uruguay) Racing)
6	DF	ENG	Joleon Lescott (from (England) Aston Villa)
7	MF	GRE	Lazaros Christodoulopoulos (from (Italy) Hellas Verona)
9	FW	POR	Hugo Almeida (from (Germany) Hannover 96)
19	DF	UKR	Dmytro Chyhrynskyi (from (Ukraine) Dnipro Dnipropetrovsk)
24	DF	GRE	Konstantinos Manolas (from Levadiakos)
28	FW	GRE	Anastasios Bakasetas (from Panionios)
29	MF	ARG	Patito Rodríguez (from (Brazil) Santos)

Out:

No.	Pos.	Nation	Player
1	GK	VEN	Alain Baroja (loan return to (Venezuela) Caracas)
2	DF	GRE	Aristidis Soiledis (to (Cyprus) Omonia)
4	DF	ESP	César Arzo (to (Kazakhstan) Kairat)
6	MF	ESP	Miguel Cordero (released)
7	MF	POR	Hélder Barbosa (to (United Arab Emirates) Al-Wasl)
10	MF	GRE	Dimitris Anakoglou (to Aris)
13	GK	GRE	Fotis Karagiolidis (released)
15	DF	GRE	Stratos Svarnas (to Xanthi)
19	FW	ALG	Rafik Djebbour (released)
29	MF	GRE	Kyriakos Andreopoulos (to Iraklis)
30	MF	ARG	Diego Buonanotte (to (Chile) Universidad Católica)
33	FW	CRO	Ivan Brečević (released)
35	GK	GRE	Panagiotis Dounis (on loan to Kallithea)
36	MF	ARG	Bruno Zuculini (loan return to (England) Manchester City)
44	MF	SEN	Ablaye Yare Faye (released)
77	DF	GRE	Stavros Vasilantonopoulos (on loan to Veria)
99	FW	NGA	Macauley Chrisantus (to (Spain) Reus)

=== AEL ===
In:

No.	Pos.	Nation	Player
30	DF	ESP	Ximo Navarro (from Trikala)
64	MF	ALB	Andoni Fatjon (from Apollon Smyrnis)
16	DF	GRE	Nikolaos Golias (from Anagennisi Karditsa)
—	FW	GRE	Kostas Makris (from Dimitra Giannoulis)
33	MF	GRE	Kostas Georgakopoulos (from Doxa Manoladas)
32	GK	ARG	Matías Degra (from (Cyprus) AEL Limassol)
77	MF	SRB	Miloš Deletić (from (Serbia) Radnik Surdulica)
29	FW	GRE	Nikos Giannitsanis (from Panelefsiniakos)
3	DF	BRA	Leandro (from Lamia)
7	FW	GRE	Thomas Nazlidis (from Veria)
14	MF	GRE	Lefteris Papadopoulos (from Thyella Rafina)
11	MF	CYP	Andreas Avraam (from (Cyprus) Anorthosis)
26	DF	SVK	Pavol Farkaš (from Xanthi)

Out:

No.	Pos.	Nation	Player
7	MF	ARG	Sebastián Nayar (released)
8	MF	GRE	Konstantinos Banousis (released)
11	FW	GUI	Pato (released)
20	DF	GRE	Dimitris Komesidis (released)
23	DF	GRE	Manolis Nikolakakis (to Trikala)
27	GK	GRE	Dimitris Patsiogeorgos (released)
88	FW	SRB	Milan Bojović (released)

=== Asteras Tripolis ===
In:

No.	Pos.	Nation	Player
4	DF	FRA	Sonhy Sefil (from (France) Auxerre)
6	FW	CIV	Cedric Gondo (from (Italy) Fiorentina)
13	MF	GRE	Stavros Tsoukalas (from PAS Giannina)
19	FW	GRE	Kosmas Tsilianidis (from Iraklis)
20	MF	ARG	Luis Fariña (on loan from Benfica)
23	MF	GRE	Nikos Kaltsas (from Panathinaikos)
25	DF	GRE	Manolis Bertos (from Olympiacos)
27	MF	GRE	Giannis Kotsiras (from Panarkadikos)
30	GK	GRE	Giorgos Athanasiadis (from Panthrakikos)
69	DF	FRA	Lionel Zouma (from (France) Sochaux)
90	GK	ITA	Antonio Donnarumma (from (Italy) Genoa)

Out:

No.	Pos.	Nation	Player
3	DF	GRE	Athanasios Panteliadis (to (Cyprus) Omonia)
6	DF	ARG	Fernando Alloco (released)
13	MF	GRE	Giorgos Zisopoulos (to Atromitos)
15	DF	SEN	Khalifa Sankaré (released)
17	MF	BEL	Ritchie Kitoko (released)
19	MF	GRE	Tasos Tsokanis (to Panetolikos)
20	MF	GRE	Taxiarchis Fountas (loan return to (Austria) Red Bull Salzburg)
21	GK	GRE	Kostas Theodoropoulos (to Panionios)
27	DF	ARG	Braian Lluy (released)
30	DF	ROU	Dorin Goian (retired)
37	GK	GRE	Georgios Bantis (released)
86	MF	BRA	Ederson Tormena (released)
94	MF	FRA	Hervaine Moukam (released)

=== Atromitos ===
In:

No.	Pos.	Nation	Player
1	GK	GRE	Nikos Papadopoulos (from Panionios)
5	MF	BLR	Dzmitry Baha (from (Israel) Hapoel Haifa)
13	MF	GRE	Giorgos Zisopoulos (from Asteras Tripolis)
14	FW	FRA	Nicolas Diguiny (from Panthrakikos)
20	MF	GRE	Thomas Vasiliou (from Triglia Rafinas)
31	MF	GRE	Spyros Gougoudis (from Anagennisi Karditsa)

Out:

No.	Pos.	Nation	Player
1	GK	GRE	Vasilis Barkas (to AEK Athens)
8	MF	ESP	Fernando Usero (released)
9	MF	ROU	Cosmin Matei (to (Turkey) Gençlerbirliği)
16	MF	GRE	Panagiotis Ballas (to (Germany) SG Sonnenhof Großaspach)
21	DF	SEN	Pape M'Bow (released)
22	DF	GRE	Pantelis Theologou (on loan to (Cyprus) Aris Limassol)
86	MF	BRA	Chumbinho (to Levadiakos)

=== Iraklis ===
In:

No.	Pos.	Nation	Player
—	MF	GRE	Pavlos Laskaris (from Fostiras)
—	GK	GRE	Trifonas Gioudas (from Panthrakikos)
—	DF	GRE	Albert Roussos (on loan from (Italy) Juventus)
—	MF	GRE	Vasilis Angelopoulos (from Panathinaikos)
—	MF	GRE	Kyriakos Andreopoulos (from AEK Athens)

Out:

No.	Pos.	Nation	Player
4	DF	GRE	Aristotelis Karasalidis (to Xanthi)
6	MF	GRE	Paschalis Kassos (to Apollon Smyrnis)
7	FW	GRE	Kosmas Tsilianidis (to Asteras Tripolis)
10	MF	ARG	Diego Romano (to Apollon Smyrnis)
11	MF	GRE	Nikos Pourtoulidis (to Apollon Smyrnis)
15	MF	ROU	Costin Lazăr (released)
39	FW	GRE	Apostolos Vellios (to (England) Nottingham Forest)
99	FW	TUR	Kerem Bulut (released)

=== Kerkyra ===
In:

No.	Pos.	Nation	Player
3	DF	MKD	Vladimir Dimitrovski (from (Czech Republic) Teplice)
33	DF	GRE	Giannis Zaradoukas (from Xanthi)
7	MF	GRE	Fotis Georgiou (from AEL Kalloni)
50	FW	BRA	Thuram (on loan from (Brazil) Monte Azul)
17	DF	GRE	Spyros Spinoulas (from Panegialios)
4	MF	NGA	David Nazim (from Zakynthos)
21	MF	GRE	Stefanos Siontis (from Veria)
26	MF	GER	Denis Epstein (from (Germany) FSV Frankfurt)

Out:

No.	Pos.	Nation	Player
4	DF	GRE	Aristotelis Karagiannidis (released)
29	MF	GRE	Kyriakos Andreopoulos (loan return to AEK Athens)

=== Levadiakos ===
In:

No.	Pos.	Nation	Player
86	MF	BRA	Chumbinho (from Atromitos)
21	MF	GRE	Zisis Karahalios (from Anagennisi Karditsa)
25	GK	GRE	Simeon Sinodinos (from Kavala)
13	GK	GRE	Tasos Daskalakis (from Olympiacos Volos)
1	GK	MDA	Stanislav Namaşco (from (Azerbaijan) AZAL PFK)
11	FW	GRE	Stylianos Vasileiou (from Panetolikos)

Out:

No.	Pos.	Nation	Player
3	DF	GRE	Konstantinos Manolas (to AEK Athens)
4	DF	BIH	Sanel Jahić (to (Bosnia and Herzegovina) Željezničar)
8	MF	CHA	Azrack Mahamat (released)
11	MF	GRE	Christos Mingas (to Trikala)
14	MF	NGA	Abdul Ajagun (loan return to Panathinaikos)
25	DF	GRE	Giannis Stathis (released)
27	DF	UKR	Andriy Tsurikov (loan return to (Ukraine) Dynamo Kyiv)
31	FW	COM	Ben Nabouhane (loan return to Olympiacos)
32	GK	BLR	Syarhey Vyeramko (to (Belarus) BATE)

=== Olympiacos ===
In:

No.	Pos.	Nation	Player
77	DF	POR	Diogo Figueiras (from (Spain) Sevilla)
34	DF	CYP	Constantinos Laifis (from (Cyprus) Anorthosis)
24	DF	ESP	Alberto de la Bella (on loan from (Spain) Real Sociedad)
31	GK	ITA	Nicola Leali (on loan from (Italy) Juventus)
28	MF	POR	André Martins (from (Portugal) Sporting CP)

Out:

No.	Pos.	Nation	Player
34	DF	CYP	Constantinos Laifis (on loan to (Belgium) Standard Liège)
4	DF	GRE	Manolis Bertos (to Asteras Tripolis)
31	FW	COM	Ben Nabouhane (on loan to Panionios)
15	MF	ALB	Qazim Laci (on loan to (Cyprus) APOEL)
16	GK	ESP	Roberto (to (Spain) Espanyol)
17	FW	MEX	Alan Pulido (to (Mexico) Guadalajara)
19	MF	ESP	David Fuster (released)
20	MF	GRE	Dimitris Kolovos (on loan to (Belgium) Mechelen)
26	DF	FRA	Arthur Masuaku (to (England) West ham United)
27	FW	PAR	Jorge Benítez (to (Mexico) Cruz Azul, previously on loan)
30	DF	BRA	Leandro Salino (released)
77	FW	POR	Hernâni (loan return to (Portugal) Porto)

=== Panathinaikos ===
In:

No.	Pos.	Nation	Player
5	DF	POR	Nuno Reis (from (France) Metz)
6	DF	CGO	Christopher Samba (from (Russia) Dynamo Moscow)
8	FW	COL	Víctor Ibarbo (on loan from (Italy) Cagliari)
20	FW	ARG	Lautaro Rinaldi (from (Argentina) Argentinos Juniors)
22	MF	GHA	Wakaso Mubarak (from (Russia) Rubin Kazan)
23	DF	SWE	Niklas Hult (from (France) Nice)
24	MF	ITA	Cristian Ledesma (from (Brazil) Santos)
40	FW	COD	Paul-José M'Poku (on loan from (Italy) Chievo Verona)
51	DF	BUL	Ivan Ivanov (from (Bulgaria) Lokomotiv Plovdiv)
78	DF	MLI	Ousmane Coulibaly (from Platanias)

Out:

No.	Pos.	Nation	Player
6	MF	ALG	Mehdi Abeid (to (France) Dijon)
8	MF	GRE	Anastasios Lagos (to (Germany) Würzburger Kickers)
14	MF	NGA	Abdul Jeleel Ajagun (on loan to (Netherlands) Roda JC)
16	MF	GRE	Vasilis Angelopoulos (to Iraklis)
18	MF	GRE	Christos Donis (on loan to PAS Giannina)
23	MF	GRE	Nikos Kaltsas (to Asteras Tripolis)
21	DF	ESP	Nano (to (Spain) Almería)
24	DF	ESP	Sergio Sánchez (to (Russia) Rubin Kazan)
28	FW	BEL	Victor Klonaridis (to (France) Lens)
32	MF	CRO	Danijel Pranjić (to (Slovenia) Koper)
33	FW	CRO	Mladen Petrić (retired)
35	GK	GRE	Alexandros Anagnostopoulos (to Aris)
36	FW	GRE	Lazaros Lamprou (to Iraklis)
45	GK	GRE	Nikos Giannakopoulos (on loan to (Cyprus) Aris Limassol)
61	GK	GRE	Konstantinos Kotsaris (on loan to (Cyprus) Omonia)
77	FW	BRA	Yuri Mamute (loan return to (Brazil) Grêmio)
95	MF	BRA	Lucas Evangelista (loan return to (Italy) Udinese)

=== Panetolikos ===
In:

No.	Pos.	Nation	Player
20	DF	POR	Luís Rocha (from (Portugal) Vitória Guimarães)
4	DF	POR	Miguel Rodrigues (from (Portugal) Nacional)
9	FW	POR	Tomané (from (Portugal) Vitória Guimarães)
19	MF	GRE	Tasos Tsokanis (from Asteras Tripolis)
8	MF	BRA	Farley Rosa (from (Brazil) Monte Azul)

Out:

No.	Pos.	Nation	Player
16	MF	BOL	Danny Bejarano (on loan to (Ecuador) Mushuc Runa)
8	MF	BLR	Illya Aleksiyevich (released)
29	FW	GRE	Stylianos Vasileiou (to Levadiakos)

=== Panionios ===
In:

No.	Pos.	Nation	Player
12	GK	GRE	Kostas Theodoropoulos (from Asteras Tripolis)
14	MF	TUR	Erdi Şehit (on loan from (Turkey) Fenerbahçe)
15	DF	CYP	Marios Antoniades (from (Cyprus) APOEL)
31	FW	FRA	Ben Nabouhane (on loan from Olympiacos)
11	FW	NGA	Michael Olaitan (from Olympiacos)
9	MF	GRE	Taxiarchis Fountas (from (Austria) Red Bull Salzburg)
77	MF	IRN	Masoud Shojaei (from (Qatar) Al-Gharafa)

Out:

No.	Pos.	Nation	Player
1	GK	GRE	Nikos Papadopoulos (to Atromitos)
9	FW	GRE	Tasos Karamanos (loan return to Olympiacos)
13	GK	GRE	Sokratis Dioudis (loan return to (Belgium) Club Brugge)
14	FW	GRE	Anastasios Bakasetas (to AEK Athens)

=== PAOK ===
In:

No.	Pos.	Nation	Player
3	DF	BRA	Léo Matos (from (Ukraine) Dnipro Dnipropetrovsk)
10	FW	ANG	Djalma Campos (from (Turkey) Gençlerbirliği)
15	DF	ESP	José Ángel Crespo (from (England) Aston Villa)
21	MF	NED	Diego Biseswar (from (Turkey) Kayserispor)
23	GK	SRB	Željko Brkić (from (Italy) Udinese)
28	MF	UKR	Yevhen Shakhov (from (Ukraine) Dnipro Dnipropetrovsk)
87	MF	ESP	José Cañas (from (Spain) Espanyol)
43	DF	POR	Fernando Varela (from (Romania) Steaua București)

Out:

No.	Pos.	Nation	Player
7	MF	ISR	Eyal Golasa (released)
10	FW	BUL	Dimitar Berbatov (released)
11	MF	SVK	Róbert Mak (to (Russia) Zenit)
15	DF	POR	Miguel Vítor (to (Israel) Hapoel Be'er Sheva)
25	GK	SWE	Robin Olsen (to (Denmark) Copenhagen)

=== PAS Giannina ===
In:

No.	Pos.	Nation	Player
18	MF	GRE	Christos Donis (on loan from Panathinaikos)
55	FW	SRB	Enes Dolovac (from (Serbia) Novi Pazar U19)
93	FW	FRA	Christopher Maboulou (from (France) Bastia)
9	FW	ESP	Pedro Conde (from (Spain) Mérida)
10	FW	BRA	Jairo (on loan from PAOK)
33	FW	BRA	Higor Vidal (from (Brazil) Londrina EC)
2	DF	GRE	Michalis Boukouvalas (from (Greece) Iraklis)

Out:

No.	Pos.	Nation	Player
19	MF	GRE	Antonis Iliadis (to Platanias)
21	MF	GRE	Stavros Tsoukalas (to Asteras Tripolis)
33	FW	GRE	Michalis Manias (to (Belgium) Westerlo)

=== Platanias ===
In:

No.	Pos.	Nation	Player
34	DF	UKR	Vitaliy Pryndeta (from (Ukraine) Volyn Lutsk)
5	DF	CYP	Christos Karipidis (from Skoda Xanthi)
14	MF	GRE	Antonis Iliadis (from PAS Giannina)
9	FW	GRE	Georgios Manousos (from AEL Kalloni)
90	MF	ESP	Didac Devesa (from Aiginiakos)

Out:

No.	Pos.	Nation	Player
5	DF	GRE	Dimitris Alkis (to Ergotelis)
9	FW	ARG	Leonardo Ramos (released)
10	FW	SRB	Luka Milunović (released)
18	MF	MWI	Tawonga Chimodzi (released)
25	DF	GRE	Giorgos Valerianos (to Apollon Smyrnis)
28	FW	GRE	Konstantinos Pangalos (to (Cyprus) AEZ Zakakiou)
33	DF	UKR	Yevhen Selin (loan return to (Ukraine) Dynamo Kyiv)

=== Xanthi ===
In:

No.	Pos.	Nation	Player
2	DF	GRE	Thanasis Papageorgiou (from Panthrakikos)
6	MF	ESP	Pablo de Lucas (from (Romania) Viitorul Constanța)
9	FW	TUN	Hamza Younés (from (Romania) Concordia Chiajna)
20	GK	SRB	Živko Živković (from (Serbia) Partizan)
33	DF	GRE	Stratos Svarnas (from AEK Athens)
4	DF	GRE	Aristotelis Karasalidis (from Iraklis)

Out:

No.	Pos.	Nation	Player
4	DF	GRE	Manolis Bertos (to Asteras Tripolis)
17	DF	ROU	Manolis Papasterianos (released)
19	FW	ALB	Vasil Shkurti (to (Cyprus) Aris Limassol)
26	DF	SVK	Pavol Farkaš (to AEL)
28	DF	GRE	Dimitrios Goutas (loan return to Olympiacos)
30	FW	ROU	Pantelis Kapetanos (released)
33	DF	GRE	Giannis Zaradoukas (to Kerkyra)
35	GK	ITA	Luigi Cennamo (released)
55	DF	CYP	Christos Karipidis (to Platanias)
87	MF	BUL	Nikolay Dimitrov (released)

=== Veria ===
In:

No.	Pos.	Nation	Player
4	DF	GRE	Christos Melissis (from Panthrakikos)
95	DF	GRE	Giannis Charontakis (from Trikala)
88	DF	GEO	Giorgi Navalovski (from (Russia) SKA-Energiya Khabarovsk)
3	DF	GHA	Mark Asigba (on loan from Olympiacos)
2	DF	BRA	Bruno Bertucci (free agent)
96	MF	GRE	Dimitris Mavrias (from Anagennisi Karditsa)
7	MF	ESP	Toni Calvo (from (Cyprus) Anorthosis)
23	FW	ARG	Miguel Alba (from (Cyprus) Pafos FC)

Out:

No.	Pos.	Nation	Player
7	MF	GRE	Giorgos Georgiadis (to (Cyprus) AEL Limassol)
9	FW	GRE	Thomas Nazlidis (to AEL)
10	MF	GRE	Dimitris Anakoglou (loan return to AEK Athens)
13	MF	COM	Mohamed Youssouf (released)
22	MF	GRE	Stefanos Siontis (to Kerkyra)
23	DF	FRA	William Edjenguélé (released)
33	FW	GRE	Dimitrios Manos (released)
77	FW	BIH	Saša Kajkut (released)
86	MF	POL	Radosław Majewski (to (Poland) Lech Poznań)
