= List of Greek football transfers winter 2016–17 =

This is a list of Greek football transfers in the 2016-17 winter transfer window by club. Only clubs in the 2016–17 Super League Greece are included.

== Super League Greece ==
=== AEK Athens ===
In:

No.	Pos.	Nation	Player
4	DF	BIH	Ognjen Vranješ (from (Russia) Tom Tomsk)
6	MF	SWE	Astrit Ajdarević (from (Sweden) Örebro)
11	FW	ARG	Sergio Araujo (on loan from (Spain) Las Palmas)
17	DF	BRA	Vinícius Freitas (from (Italy) Lazio)
31	FW	GRE	Dimitris Melikiotis (from Veria)

Out:

No.	Pos.	Nation	Player
11	MF	GRE	Vangelis Platellas (to Atromitos)
17	MF	MNE	Darko Zorić (to (Serbia) Čukarički)
55	DF	GRE	Adam Tzanetopoulos (on loan to Iraklis)

=== AEL ===
In:

No.	Pos.	Nation	Player
9	FW	HON	Diego Reyes (from (Honduras) Marathón)
12	MF	RSA	Lehlogonolo Masalesa (from (South Africa) Orlando Pirates)
15	DF	FRA	Steven Thicot (free agent)
24	MF	LVA	Jānis Ikaunieks (from (France) Metz)
25	GK	GRE	Kostas Theodoropoulos (from Panionios)
44	MF	AZE	Amit Guluzade (from (Azerbaijan) Sumgayit)
96	MF	NED	James Efmorfidis (free agent)
97	MF	ESP	Pablo Gállego (from (Spain) Lealtad)
99	FW	ESP	Alejandro Chacopino (from (Spain) Marbella)

Out:

No.	Pos.	Nation	Player
--	DF	GRE	Lefteris Papadopoulos (on loan to Kallithea)
1	GK	GRE	Zacharias Kavousakis (to Panetolikos)
9	FW	GRE	Mattheos Maroukakis (to Trikala)
92	DF	GRE	Giannis Potouridis (released)

=== Asteras Tripolis ===
In:

No.	Pos.	Nation	Player
3	DF	BLR	Vital Hayduchyk (on loan from (Belarus) BATE Borisov)
11	FW	GRE	Michalis Manias (from (Belgium) Westerlo)
33	DF	UKR	Yevhen Selin (from (Ukraine) Dynamo Kyiv)

Out:

No.	Pos.	Nation	Player
2	MF	BRA	Dudú (on loan to (Cyprus) Nea Salamina)
4	DF	FRA	Sonhy Sefil (released)
8	MF	GRE	Dimitrios Kourbelis (to Panathinaikos)
9	MF	ARG	Cristian Chávez (to (Bolivia) Wilstermann)
11	MF	ARG	Nicolás Fernández (to (Malaysia) Johor Darul Ta'zim)

=== Atromitos ===
In:

No.	Pos.	Nation	Player
3	DF	GRE	Athanasios Panteliadis (on loan from (Cyprus) Omonia)
17	MF	GRE	Vangelis Platellas (from AEK Athens)
21	MF	GRE	Pavlos Kyriakidis (from Iraklis)
22	MF	GRE	Giannis Maniatis (from Olympiacos)
27	FW	NGA	Abiola Dauda (from (Netherlands) Vitesse)

Out:

No.	Pos.	Nation	Player
15	MF	SEN	Paul Keita (to Kerkyra)
18	MF	MNE	Miloš Stojčev (on loan to Veria)
20	DF	ARG	Mariano Bíttolo (to (Spain) Córdoba)
25	FW	GRE	Michalis Bastakos (on loan from Atromitos)
32	MF	GRE	Dimitris Grontis (to Iraklis)
33	FW	GRE	Dimitrios Papadopoulos (to Panetolikos)

=== Iraklis ===
In:

No.	Pos.	Nation	Player
4	DF	GRE	Leonidas Argyropoulos (from Panionios)
6	DF	GRE	Adam Tzanetopoulos (on loan from AEK Athens)
18	MF	GRE	Christos Donis (on loan from Panathinaikos)
19	MF	GRE	Antonis Iliadis (from Platanias)
21	MF	GRE	Dimitrios Grontis (from Atromitos)
22	FW	GRE	Michalis Bastakos (on loan from Atromitos)

Out:

No.	Pos.	Nation	Player
19	MF	GRE	Pavlos Kyriakidis (to Atromitos)
21	MF	GRE	Pavlos Laskaris (released)
22	DF	ARG	Sebastián Bartolini (to Apollon Smyrnis)
30	GK	SVK	Dušan Perniš (released)
80	FW	GRE	Lazaros Lamprou (to PAOK)

=== Kerkyra ===
In:

No.	Pos.	Nation	Player
2	MF	SEN	Paul Keita (from Atromitos)
9	FW	NGA	Ifeanyi Onyilo (on loan from (Saudi Arabia) Al-Faisaly)
20	FW	GRE	Efthymis Gkamagkas (from Kalloni)
29	MF	FRA	Kévin Diogo (from (France) Clermont)

Out:

No.	Pos.	Nation	Player
9	FW	GRE	Alexandros Arnarellis (to Trikala)
23	DF	GRE	Stratos Chintzidis (to Apollon Smyrnis)

=== Levadiakos ===
In:

No.	Pos.	Nation	Player
15	DF	SEN	Ibrahima Niasse (from Olympiacos)
18	MF	ALB	Qazim Laçi (on loan from Olympiacos)
39	MF	COM	Mohamed Youssouf (free agent)
44	DF	GRE	Praxitelis Vouros (on loan from Olympiacos)

Out:

No.	Pos.	Nation	Player

=== Olympiacos ===
In:

No.	Pos.	Nation	Player
17	FW	IRN	Karim Ansarifard (from Panionios)
22	DF	FRA	Aly Cissokho (on loan from (England) Aston Villa)
44	DF	ECU	Juan Carlos Paredes (on loan from (England) Watford)

Out:

No.	Pos.	Nation	Player
2	MF	GRE	Giannis Maniatis (to Atromitos)
15	MF	ALB	Qazim Laçi (on loan to Levadiakos)
14	DF	NOR	Omar Elabdellaoui (on loan to (England) Hull City)
20	DF	GRE	Konstantinos Tsimikas (on loan to (Denmark) Esbjerg)
21	FW	POR	Gonçalo Paciência (loan return to (Portugal) Porto)
23	DF	GRE	Dimitris Siovas (on loan to (Spain) Leganés)
29	DF	GRE	Praxitelis Vouros (on loan to Levadiakos)
44	MF	SRB	Saša Zdjelar (on loan to (Spain) Mallorca)
90	MF	COL	Felipe Pardo (on loan to (France) Nantes)

=== Panathinaikos ===
In:

No.	Pos.	Nation	Player
8	FW	SWE	Guillermo Molins (from (China) Beijing Renhe)
14	FW	BEL	Viktor Klonaridis (on loan from (France) Lens)
21	MF	GRE	Dimitrios Kourbelis (from Asteras Tripolis)

Out:

No.	Pos.	Nation	Player
18	MF	GRE	Christos Donis (on loan to Iraklis)
6	DF	CGO	Christopher Samba (released)
8	FW	COL	Víctor Ibarbo (loan return to (Italy) Cagliari)
22	MF	GHA	Mubarak Wakaso (on loan to (Spain) Granada)
24	MF	ITA	Cristian Ledesma (to (Italy) Ternana)

=== Panetolikos ===
In:

No.	Pos.	Nation	Player
6	DF	ARG	Federico Bravo (from (Argentina) Boca Juniors)
11	FW	GRE	Dimitrios Papadopoulos (from Atromitos)
16	MF	ESP	Álvaro Rey (from (Spain) Alcorcón)
30	MF	BRA	Diego Lopes (on loan from (Portugal) Benfica)
31	GK	GRE	Zacharias Kavousakis (from AEL)

Out:

No.	Pos.	Nation	Player
9	FW	POR	Tomané (to (Portugal) Arouca)
11	MF	ARG	Osmar Ferreyra (to (Argentina) Boca Unidos)
13	DF	BEL	Wouter Corstjens (to (Belgium) Lommel United)
27	MF	ARG	Emmanuel Ledesma (released)
36	DF	COD	Wilson Kamavuaka (to (Germany) SV Darmstadt 98)
74	MF	EGY	Amr Warda (to PAOK)
99	GK	POR	Cristiano (to (Portugal) Belenenses)

=== Panionios ===
In:

No.	Pos.	Nation	Player
2	DF	GRE	Vasileios Pliatsikas (from (Slovakia) Slovan Bratislava)
5	DF	CYP	Stefanos Mouhtaris (from Kallithea)
8	MF	GRE	Panagiotis Ballas (from (Germany) Sonnenhof Großaspach)
11	FW	GRE	Lazaros Lamprou (on loan from PAOK)
52	FW	BIH	Aidin Mahmutović (from (Czech Republic) Příbram)
69	FW	GER	Samed Yeşil (free agent)
72	MF	FRA	Kevin Tapoko (from (Belgium) White Star Bruxelles)
73	GK	GRE	Georgios Bantis (from (Cyprus) Omonia)

Out:

No.	Pos.	Nation	Player
8	MF	GRE	Nikos Kritikos (to Apollon Smyrnis)
10	FW	IRN	Karim Ansarifard (to Olympiacos)
12	GK	GRE	Kostas Theodoropoulos (to AEL)
17	FW	GRE	Aggelos Kerasidis (on loan to Kallithea)
20	DF	GRE	Leonidas Argyropoulos (to Iraklis)
25	MF	GRE	Aggelos Piniotis (on loan to Kallithea)

=== PAOK ===
In:

No.	Pos.	Nation	Player
7	MF	EGY	Amr Warda (from Panetolikos)
9	FW	SUI	Aleksandar Prijović (from (Poland) Legia Warsaw)
11	MF	BRA	Pedro Henrique (from (France) Stade Rennais)

Out:

No.	Pos.	Nation	Player
14	FW	ARG	Facundo Pereyra (on loan to (Argentina) Colón)
1	GK	GRE	Markos Vellidis (released)
2	DF	GRE	Giannis Skondras (to (Scotland) Hamilton Academical)
6	MF	GRE	Alexandros Tziolis (to (Scotland) Heart of Midlothian)
7	FW	SEN	Mame Thiam (loan return to (Italy) Juventus)
11	FW	GRE	Lazaros Lamprou (on loan to Panionios)
18	DF	GRE	Dimitris Giannoulis (on loan to (Cyprus) Anorthosis)
24	MF	CPV	Garry Rodrigues (to (Turkey) Galatasaray)
31	DF	GRE	Georgios Tzavellas (to (Turkey) Alanyaspor)
34	MF	GRE	Nikos Korovesis (on loan to PAS Giannina)
80	MF	GRE	Anastasios Dimitriadis (on loan to (Slovakia) Zemplín Michalovce)

=== PAS Giannina ===
In:

No.	Pos.	Nation	Player
34	MF	GRE	Nikos Korovesis (on loan from PAOK)

Out:

No.	Pos.	Nation	Player
14	FW	GRE	Dimitrios Ferfelis (to Lamia)
18	MF	GRE	Christos Donis (loan return to Panathinaikos)

=== Platanias ===
In:

No.	Pos.	Nation	Player
—	FW	BLR	Mikalay Signevich (on loan from (Belarus) BATE Borisov)
—	MF	UKR	Renat Mochulyak (from (Ukraine) Dynamo-2 Kyiv)
—	DF	GRE	Stelios Marangos (from Veria)

Out:

No.	Pos.	Nation	Player
6	MF	BIH	Ognjen Gnjatić (to (Netherlands) Roda JC Kerkrade)
10	MF	GRE	Athanasios Tsourakis (to (Germany) SW Essen)
14	MF	GRE	Antonis Iliadis (to Iraklis)
99	FW	BIH	Haris Dilaver (to (Bosnia and Herzegovina) Čelik Zenica)

=== Xanthi ===
In:

No.	Pos.	Nation	Player
12	MF	HON	Alfredo Mejía (from (Honduras) Marathón)
25	MF	ARM	Marcos Pizzelli (from (United Arab Emirates) Al-Fujairah)
27	DF	FRA	Salimo Sylla (from (Belgium) Sint-Truiden)
71	MF	GRE	Manolis Papasterianos (from Veria)

Out:

No.	Pos.	Nation	Player
23	MF	ESP	Dani Nieto (released)

=== Veria ===
In:

No.	Pos.	Nation	Player
—	MF	COM	Halifa Soulé (from OFI Crete)
—	MF	TUN	Tijani Belaïd (from (Tunisia) Sfaxien)
—	MF	MNE	Miloš Stojčev (on loan from Atromitos)
—	DF	ARM	Gaël Andonian (on loan from (France) Marseille)
—	FW	GRE	Christos Tzioras (from Acharnaikos)
—	MF	ALG	Yacine Hadji (from (France) Noisy-le-Sec)
—	FW	NGA	Kennedy Igboananike (from (United States) D.C. United)
—	MF	GRE	Stelios Iliadis (from Panthrakikos)

Out:

No.	Pos.	Nation	Player
5	DF	GRE	Stelios Marangos (to Platanias)
14	MF	ESP	Sisi (to (Japan) Gifu)
20	FW	GRE	Dimitris Melikiotis (to AEK Athens)
26	MF	AUS	Terry Antonis (loan return to PAOK)
71	MF	GRE	Manolis Papasterianos (to Xanthi)
88	DF	GEO	Giorgi Navalovski (to (Azerbaijan) Neftçi)
94	DF	GRE	Giannis Charontakis (to (Serbia) Vojvodina)
