= 2015–16 Asteras Tripolis F.C. season =

Asteras Tripolis
2015–16 season
- Manager: Staikos Vergetis (until 29 January 2016); Dimitrios Terezopoulos (caretaker, from 29 January 2016 to 29 February 2016); Makis Chavos (from 29 February 2016)
- Stadium: Theodoros Kolokotronis Stadium
- Super League Greece: 7th
- Greek Cup: Quarter-finals
- UEFA Europa League: Group stage
- Top goalscorer: League: Apostolos Giannou (13); All: Apostolos Giannou (14)
- Average home league attendance: 2,058
- Biggest win: 4–0 v Kalloni (Home, 28 October 2015, Greek Cup); 4–0 v Panthrakikos (Home, 2 January 2016, Super League Greece)
- Biggest defeat: 0–5 v Olympiacos (Away, 27 January 2016, Greek Cup)
Home colours	Away colours	Third colours

The 2015–16 season was Asteras Tripolis Football Club's 9th consecutive season in the Super League Greece. In addition to the domestic league, Asteras Tripolis participated in that season's editions of the Greek Football Cup and the UEFA Europa League.

Staikos Vergetis was sacked as Asteras Tripolis manager on 29 January 2016, following the team's 5–0 defeat by Olympiacos in the first leg of the Greek Cup quarter-finals, although he remained at the club in another capacity. Dimitrios Terezopoulos, who had previously served as his assistant, took charge of the team as caretaker manager following his departure. Terezopoulos was replaced by Makis Chavos on 29 February 2016.

== Squad ==
Squad at end of season

Note: Flags indicate national team as defined under FIFA eligibility rules; some limited exceptions apply. Players may hold more than one non-FIFA nationality.

No.	Pos.	Nation	Player
1	GK	SVK	Tomáš Košický
2	MF	BRA	Dudu
3	DF	GRE	Thanasis Panteliadis
5	DF	GRE	Konstantinos Triantafyllopoulos
6	DF	ARG	Fernando Alloco
7	FW	ARG	Pablo Mazza
8	MF	GRE	Elini Dimoutsos
9	MF	ARG	Cristian Chávez
10	FW	GRE	Nikolaos Ioannidis
11	MF	ARG	Nico Fernández
13	MF	GRE	Giorgos Zisopoulos
15	DF	SEN	Khalifa Sankaré
17	DF	BEL	Ritchie Kitoko
18	DF	GRE	Kostas Giannoulis
19	MF	GRE	Tasos Tsokanis
20	MF	GRE	Taxiarchis Fountas

No.	Pos.	Nation	Player
21	GK	GRE	Konstantinos Theodoropoulos
23	MF	ARG	Facundo Bertoglio
24	MF	ESP	Lazaros Velissaris
25	MF	GRE	Dimitris Kourbelis
27	DF	ARG	Braian Lluy
30	DF	ROU	Dorin Goian (captain)
31	MF	SRB	Aleksandar Stanisavljević
33	DF	GRE	Aggelos Zissis
37	GK	GRE	Georgios Bantis
54	MF	MAR	Rachid Hamdani
62	MF	ARG	Walter Iglesias
71	MF	GRE	Panagiotis Grosios
86	MF	BEL	Ederson
94	FW	FRA	Hervaine Moukam
96	FW	BRA	Igor
98	GK	GRE	Konstantinos Kapetanos

== Competitions ==
=== Overview ===
Competition	First match	Last match	Starting round	Final position	Record							
Competition	First match	Last match	Starting round	Final position	Pld	W	D	L	GF	GA	GD	Win %
Super League Greece	22 August 2015	17 April 2016	Matchday 1	7th	30	11	8	11	31	30	+1	36.67
Greek Football Cup	28 October 2015	3 February 2016	Group stage	Quarter-finals	7	5	1	1	15	7	+8	71.43
UEFA Europa League	17 September 2015	10 December 2015	Group stage	Group stage	6	1	1	4	4	12	−8	16.67
Total					43	17	10	16	50	49	+1	39.53

Source: Competitions

=== Super League Greece ===
==== League table ====
Pos	Team	Pld	W	D	L	GF	GA	GD	Pts	Qualification or relegation
5	Panionios	30	12	8	10	33	27	+6	44	Qualification for the Play-offs
6	PAS Giannina	30	12	6	12	36	40	−4	42	Qualification for the Europa League second qualifying round (Note: The fifth-placed team of the 2015–16 Super League Greece Panionios would have qualified for the UEFA Europa League second qualifying round, but were excluded from participating in the 2016–17 European competitions by UEFA for financial reasons. As a result, the berth was given to the sixth-placed team PAS Giannina.)
7	Asteras Tripolis	30	11	8	11	31	30	+1	41	
8	Atromitos (Note: Atromitos were deducted 3 points due to extreme fan behavior against AEK.)	30	12	6	12	26	31	−5	39 (Note: Head-to-head points: Atromitos 4, Platanias 1.)	
9	Platanias	30	10	9	11	32	30	+2	39	

Source: Super League Greece
Rules for classification: 1) Points; 2) Head-to-head points; 3) Head-to-head goal difference; 4) Goals scored; 5) Goals against; 6) Play-offs (neutral ground); 7) Draw.
(Note: Criteria 6 is only used if needed to decide champion, teams for relegation or teams for UEFA competitions).

==== Results summary ====
Overall								Home						Away					
Pld	W	D	L	GF	GA	GD	Pts	W	D	L	GF	GA	GD	W	D	L	GF	GA	GD
30	11	8	11	31	30	+1	41	7	5	3	20	12	+8	4	3	8	11	18	−7

Source: Soccerway

==== Results by round ====
Round	1	2	3	4	5	6	7	8	9	10	11	12	13	14	15	16	17	18	19	20	21	22	23	24	25	26	27	28	29	30
Ground	A	H	A	H	A	H	H	A	H	A	H	A	H	A	A	H	A	H	A	H	A	A	H	A	H	A	H	A	H	H
Result	W	L	D	W	L	D	D	W	W	W	W	L	L	L	L	W	L	W	D	W	L	D	D	L	D	L	L	W	D	W
Position	3	7	8	4	5	6	6	5	5	4	2	4	5	5	7	5	6	5	5	5	6	5	5	6	6	6	8	7	9	8
Points	3	3	4	7	7	8	9	12	15	18	21	21	21	21	21	24	24	27	28	31	31	32	33	33	34	34	34	37	38	41

Source: Worldfootball
A = Away; H = Home; W = Win; D = Draw; L = Loss

==== Matches ====
22 August 2015 1	Panthrakikos	0–2	Asteras Tripolis	Komotini
19:15 EEST (UTC+3)		Report	Bertoglio 25'; Giannou 63'	Stadium: Komotini Municipal Stadium; Referee: I. Papadopoulos

30 August 2015 2	Asteras Tripolis	0–2	Panetolikos	Tripoli
19:15 EEST (UTC+3)		Report	Warda 34'; Villafáñez 90+6'	Stadium: Theodoros Kolokotronis Stadium; Attendance: 7,616; Referee: S. Tritsonis

12 September 2015 3	Kalloni	1–1	Asteras Tripolis	Mytilene
16:00 EEST (UTC+3)	Anastasiadis 90+5'	Report	Giannou 83' (pen.)	Stadium: Mytilene Municipal Stadium; Referee: V. Aristeidis

23 September 2015 4	Asteras Tripolis	2–1	Panionios	Tripoli
18:15 EEST (UTC+3)	Giannou 10'; Dimoutsos 13'	Report	Goian 27' (o.g.)	Stadium: Theodoros Kolokotronis Stadium; Attendance: 1,420; Referee: M. Koukoulakis

27 September 2015 5	Levadiakos	2–1	Asteras Tripolis	Livadeia
18:15 EEST (UTC+3)	Mantzios 45+1', 49'	Report	Giannou 87'	Stadium: Levadia Municipal Stadium; Referee: A. Tzilos

5 October 2015 6	Asteras Tripolis	1–1	Platanias	Tripoli
19:30 EEST (UTC+3)	Giannou 6'	Report	Milunović 13'	Stadium: Theodoros Kolokotronis Stadium; Attendance: 1,513; Referee: A. Dimitropoulos

18 October 2015 7	Asteras Tripolis	1–1	Skoda Xanthi	Tripoli
18:15 EEST (UTC+3)	Shkurti 34'	Report	Nieto 68'	Stadium: Theodoros Kolokotronis Stadium; Attendance: 1,725; Referee: D. Thanos

25 October 2015 8	PAS Giannina	1–2	Asteras Tripolis	Ioannina
17:15 EET (UTC+2)	Manias 4'	Report	Giannou 38' (pen.), 81'	Stadium: Zosimades Stadium; Referee: D. Stiliaras

1 November 2015 9	Asteras Tripolis	2–1	PAOK	Tripoli
15:00 EET (UTC+2)	Bertoglio 49'; Sankaré 82'	Report	Pelkas 23'	Stadium: Theodoros Kolokotronis Stadium; Attendance: 2,101; Referee: A. Pappas

8 November 2015 10	AEK Athens	0–1	Asteras Tripolis	Athens
19:30 EET (UTC+2)		Report	Papadopoulos 89'	Stadium: Olympic Stadium; Attendance: 10,051; Referee: M. Koukoulakis

21 November 2015 11	Asteras Tripolis	1–0	Atromitos	Tripoli
15:00 EET (UTC+2)	Fernández 85'	Report		Stadium: Theodoros Kolokotronis Stadium; Attendance: 1,511; Referee: G. Kominis

29 November 2015 12	Olympiacos	3–1	Asteras Tripolis	Piraeus
19:30 EET (UTC+2)	Fortounis 73' (pen.), 80'; Ideye 86'	Report	Giannou 90+3'	Stadium: Karaiskakis Stadium; Referee: G. Kyzas

5 December 2015 13	Asteras Tripolis	1–2	Iraklis	Tripoli
15:00 EET (UTC+2)	Giannou 44' (pen.)	Report	Vellios 58'; Bulut 66'	Stadium: Theodoros Kolokotronis Stadium; Attendance: 1,448; Referee: A. Dimitropoulos

13 December 2015 14	Panathinaikos	2–0	Asteras Tripolis	Athens
19:30 EET (UTC+2)	Karelis 72'; Kaltsas 90+4'	Report		Stadium: Leoforos Alexandras Stadium; Referee: M. Koukoulakis

19 December 2015 15	Veria	1–0	Asteras Tripolis	Veria
17:15 EET (UTC+2)	Kola 22'	Report		Stadium: Veria Stadium; Attendance: 586; Referee: S. Tritsonis

2 January 2016 16	Asteras Tripolis	4–0	Panthrakikos	Tripoli
15:00 EET (UTC+2)	Giannou 41', 74'; Iglesias 63'; Fountas 77'	Report		Stadium: Theodoros Kolokotronis Stadium; Attendance: 1,142; Referee: D. Karantonis

10 January 2016 17	Panetolikos	2–1	Asteras Tripolis	Agrinio
17:15 EET (UTC+2)	Rusculleda 53'; Papazoglou 72'	Report	Giannou 63'	Stadium: Panetolikos Stadium; Attendance: 1,902; Referee: M. Labropoulos

17 January 2016 18	Asteras Tripolis	3–1	Kalloni	Tripoli
17:15 EET (UTC+2)	Iglesias 52', 61'; Giannou 57'	Report	Manousos 41' (pen.)	Stadium: Theodoros Kolokotronis Stadium; Attendance: 961; Referee: C. Kalogeropoulos

23 January 2016 19	Panionios	0–0	Asteras Tripolis	Athens
17:15 EET (UTC+2)		Report		Stadium: Nea Smyrni Stadium; Attendance: 933; Referee: D. Thanos

31 January 2016 20	Asteras Tripolis	2–0	Levadiakos	Tripoli
15:00 EET (UTC+2)	Bertoglio 61'; Mazza 82'	Report		Stadium: Theodoros Kolokotronis Stadium; Attendance: 1,123; Referee: D. Karantonis

6 February 2016 21	Platanias	2–0	Asteras Tripolis	Chania
15:00 EET (UTC+2)	Goundoulakis 20'; Angulo 79'	Report		Stadium: Perivolia Municipal Stadium; Attendance: 1,469; Referee: A. Thanassakoudis

15 February 2016 22	Skoda Xanthi	0–0	Asteras Tripolis	Xanthi
19:30 EET (UTC+2)		Report		Stadium: Skoda Xanthi Arena; Attendance: 1,005; Referee: I. Papadopoulos

20 February 2016 23	Asteras Tripolis	0–0	PAS Giannina	Tripoli
17:15 EET (UTC+2)		Report		Stadium: Theodoros Kolokotronis Stadium; Attendance: 1,348; Referee: K. Evangelos

27 February 2016 24	PAOK	2–0	Asteras Tripolis	Thessaloniki
19:30 EET (UTC+2)	Pelkas 17'; Mak 77'	Report		Stadium: Toumba Stadium; Attendance: 8,812; Referee: A. Aretopoulos

7 March 2016 25	Asteras Tripolis	0–0	AEK Athens	Tripoli
19:30 EET (UTC+2)		Report		Stadium: Theodoros Kolokotronis Stadium; Attendance: 2,558; Referee: A. Papapetrou

13 March 2016 26	Atromitos	2–1	Asteras Tripolis	Athens
15:00 EET (UTC+2)	Lazaridis 68'; Le Tallec 88'	Report	Dimoutsos 17'	Stadium: Peristeri Stadium; Attendance: 519; Referee: V. Aristeidis

20 March 2016 27	Asteras Tripolis	1–2	Olympiacos	Tripoli
19:30 EET (UTC+2)	Dimoutsos 90'	Report	Fortes 1', 49'	Stadium: Theodoros Kolokotronis Stadium; Attendance: 2,447; Referee: M. Koukoulakis

3 April 2016 28	Iraklis	0–1	Asteras Tripolis	Thessaloniki
19:00 EEST (UTC+3)		Report	Fernández 24'	Stadium: Kaftanzoglio Stadium; Attendance: 1,379; Referee: A. Sidiropoulos

10 April 2016 29	Asteras Tripolis	0–0	Panathinaikos	Tripoli
19:00 EEST (UTC+3)		Report		Stadium: Theodoros Kolokotronis Stadium; Attendance: 2,326; Referee: C. Kalogeropoulos

17 April 2016 30	Asteras Tripolis	2–1	Veria	Tripoli
19:00 EEST (UTC+3)	Ioannidis 49', 73'	Report	Balafas 9'	Stadium: Theodoros Kolokotronis Stadium; Attendance: 1,638; Referee: M. Koukoulakis

=== Greek Football Cup ===
==== Group stage ====
Pos	Team	Pld	W	D	L	GF	GA	GD	Pts	Qualification	AST	KAL	KIS	PSE
1	Asteras Tripolis	3	3	0	0	8	1	+7	9	Round of 16		4–0	—	—
2	Kalloni	3	2	0	1	4	6	−2	6	Round of 16	—		—	2–1
3	Kissamikos	3	0	1	2	2	5	−3	1		1–3	1–2		—
4	Panserraikos	3	0	1	2	1	3	−2	1		0–1	—	0–0	

Source: epo.gr
Rules for classification: 1. Points 2. Head-to-head points 3. Goals scored 4. Goals against 5. Play-offs (neutral ground).

28 October 2015 1	Asteras Tripolis	4–0	Kalloni	Tripoli
19:30 EET (UTC+2)	Lanzarote 21'; Shkurti 49', 72' (pen.); Fernández 87'	Report		Stadium: Theodoros Kolokotronis Stadium

2 December 2015 2	Kissamikos	1–3	Asteras Tripolis	Lappa
15:00 EET (UTC+2)	Mantzis 75'	Report	Kitoko 56'; Moukam 62'; Fernández 90+4'	Stadium: Gallos Stadium

16 December 2015 3	Panserraikos	0–1	Asteras Tripolis	Serres
15:00 EET (UTC+2)		Report	Fountas 35'	Stadium: Serres Municipal Stadium

==== Round of 16 ====
5 January 2016 First leg	AEL	0–3	Asteras Tripolis	Larissa
17:15 EET (UTC+2)		Report	Giannoulis 18'; Fountas 28'; Moukam 85'	Stadium: AEL FC Arena

13 January 2016 Second leg	Asteras Tripolis	3–0 (6–0 agg.)	AEL	Tripoli
17:15 EET (UTC+2)	Stanisavljević 13'; Hamdani 28'; Mazza 85'	Report		Stadium: Theodoros Kolokotronis Stadium
Note: Asteras Tripolis won 6–0 on aggregate.

==== Quarter-finals ====
27 January 2016 First leg	Olympiacos	5–0	Asteras Tripolis	Piraeus
19:30 EET (UTC+2)	Ideye 13', 41'; Fortounis 50', 64'; Pardo 79'	Report		Stadium: Karaiskakis Stadium

3 February 2016 Second leg	Asteras Tripolis	1–1 (1–6 agg.)	Olympiacos	Tripoli
19:30 EET (UTC+2)	Iglesias 20'	Report	da Costa 53'	Stadium: Theodoros Kolokotronis Stadium
Note: Olympiacos won 6–1 on aggregate.

=== UEFA Europa League ===
==== Group stage ====
Pos	Team	Pld	W	D	L	GF	GA	GD	Pts	Qualification	SCH	SPP	AT	APO
1	(Germany) Schalke 04	6	4	2	0	15	3	+12	14	Advance to knockout phase	—	2–2	4–0	1–0
2	(Czech Republic) Sparta Prague	6	3	3	0	10	5	+5	12	Advance to knockout phase	1–1	—	1–0	2–0
3	(Greece) Asteras Tripolis	6	1	1	4	4	12	−8	4		0–4	1–1	—	2–0
4	(Cyprus) APOEL	6	1	0	5	3	12	−9	3		0–3	1–3	2–1	—

Source: Soccerway
Rules for classification: Group stage tiebreakers

17 September 2015 1	Asteras Tripolis (Greece)	1–1	(Czech Republic) Sparta Prague	Tripoli, Greece
22:05 EEST (UTC+3)	Mazza 2', (yellow card) 56'; Ederson (yellow card) 49'; Iglesias (yellow card) 88'	Report	Jiráček (yellow card) 40'; Lafata 56'; Hybš (yellow card) 57'; Costa (yellow card) 59'; Holek (yellow card) 73'; Frýdek (yellow card) 90+2'; Matějovský (yellow card) 90+3'; Dočkal (yellow card) 90+4'	Stadium: Theodoros Kolokotronis Stadium; Attendance: 2,984; Referee: Marijo Strahonja (Croatia); Assistant referees: Ivica Modrić (Croatia), Hrvoje Radić (Croatia); Fourth official: Igor Krmar (Croatia)

1 October 2015 2	Schalke 04 (Germany)	4–0	(Greece) Asteras Tripolis	Gelsenkirchen, Germany
19:00 CEST (UTC+2)	Di Santo 28', 37', 44' (pen.); Huntelaar 84'	Report	Ederson (yellow card) 44'; Goian (yellow card) 46'	Stadium: Veltins-Arena; Attendance: 42,447; Referee: Pol van Boekel (Netherlands); Assistant referees: Bas van Dongen, Davie Goossens; Fourth official: Patrick Langkamp

22 October 2015 3	APOEL (Cyprus)	2–1	(Greece) Asteras Tripolis	Nicosia, Cyprus
20:00 EEST (UTC+3)	Štilić (yellow card) 38'; Cavenaghi 45+9' (pen.), (yellow card) 45+11'; Carlão 59'; Waterman (yellow card) 90+5'	Report	Kourbelis (yellow card) 4'; Lluy 8'	Stadium: GSP Stadium; Attendance: 12,783; Referee: Aleksei Eskov (Russia); Assistant referees: Dmitri Mosyakin (Russia), Valeri Danchenko (Russia); Fourth official: Igor Demeshko (Russia)

5 November 2015 4	Asteras Tripolis (Greece)	2–0	(Cyprus) APOEL	Tripoli, Greece
22:05 EET (UTC+2)	Bertoglio 2'; Lanzarote (yellow card) 15'; Panteliadis (yellow card) 23'; Giannou 45+1'	Report	Artymatas (yellow card) 43'; Antoniadis (yellow card) 61'	Stadium: Theodoros Kolokotronis Stadium; Attendance: 3,624; Referee: Oliver Drachta (Austria); Assistant referees: Roland Brandner (Austria), Stefan Kuehr (Austria); Fourth official: Roland Riedel (Austria)

26 November 2015 5	Sparta Prague (Czech Republic)	1–0	(Greece) Asteras Tripolis	Prague, Czech Republic
19:00 CET (UTC+1)	Brabec 33'; Frýdek (yellow card) 56'; Krejčí (yellow card) 76' (yellow-red card) 82'	Report	Iglesias (yellow card) 55'; Dimoutsos (yellow card) 86'	Stadium: Generali Arena; Attendance: 10,140; Referee: Michael Oliver (England); Assistant referees: Stuart Burt (England), Gary Beswick (England); Fourth official: Lee Betts (England)

10 December 2015 6	Asteras Tripolis (Greece)	0–4	(Germany) Schalke 04	Tripoli, Greece
22:05 EET (UTC+2)		Report	Choupo-Moting (yellow card) 23', (goal) 37', 78'; Di Santo 29'; Højbjerg (yellow card) 85'; Meyer 86'	Stadium: Theodoros Kolokotronis Stadium; Attendance: 2,501; Referee: Liran Liany (Israel); Assistant referees: Danny Krasikow (Israel), David Elias Biton (Israel); Fourth official: Amihay Yehoshua Mozes (Israel)
