= Halifa =

Halifa is a given name and a surname which may refer to:

- Halifa Houmadi, Prime Minister of the Comoros (1994-1995) - see List of heads of government of the Comoros
- Halifa Sallah (born 1953), Gambian politician
- Halifa Soulé (born 1990), Comorian footballer
- Abdallah Halifa, a member of the Mayotte national football team and FC Mtsapéré
- Dine Halifa (born 1966), footballer from Madagascar - see 1992–93 Coupe de France
- Yehezkel Halifa, Israeli long-distance runner, national 5000 m record holder (1989) - see List of Israeli records in athletics
- Sara Halifa, a character in the Japanese manga Gallery Fake
