= Higor Vidal =

Brazilian footballer (born 1996)

Personal information
- Full name: Higor Felipe Vidal
- Date of birth: 26 September 1996 (age 30)
- Place of birth: Londrina, Brazil
- Height: 1.73 m (5 ft 8 in)
- Position: Attacking midfielder

Team information
- Current team: Shijiazhuang Gongfu

Youth career
- Santos
- Porto

Senior career*
Years	Team	Apps	(Gls)
2016–2019	PAS Giannina	61	(3)
2019–2020	Žalgiris	13	(0)
2020–2021	Hapoel Petah Tikva	28	(1)
2021–2022	Anagennisi Karditsa	24	(1)
2022–2023	Persebaya Surabaya	14	(0)
2023–2024	TS Galaxy	17	(1)
2024–2025	Erbil	19	(0)
2025	Teuta	10	(0)
2026–	Shijiazhuang Gongfu	0	(0)
- * Club domestic league appearances and goals as of 27/12/24 @ 09:11(AEST)

Higor Felipe Vidal (born 26 September 1996) is a Brazilian professional footballer who plays as an attacking midfielder for China League One club Shijiazhuang Gongfu.

== Career ==
=== PAS Giannina ===
Vidal began his professional career with Greek Super League side PAS Giannina in 2016, having previously played for the youth sides of Paraná and Londrina.He was released on a free transfer on 21 May 2019.

=== FK Žalgiris ===
In August 2019 he became a member of lithuanian Žalgiris.

=== Hapoel Petah Tikva ===
On 10 August 2020, he signed in the Liga Leumit club Hapoel Petah Tikva.

=== Shijiazhuang Gongfu ===
On 26 January 2026, Vidal signed with China League One club Shijiazhuang Gongfu.
