= Alejandro Chacopino =

Spanish footballer (born 1988)

Chacopino
Personal information
- Full name: José Alejandro Chacopino Luchoro
- Date of birth: 11 May 1988 (age 38)
- Place of birth: Alicante, Spain
- Height: 1.90 m (6 ft 3 in)
- Position: Forward

Team information
- Current team: Athletic Torrellano

Youth career
- 2004–2006: Carolinas
- 2006–2007: Torrellano

Senior career*
Years	Team	Apps	(Gls)
2007–2008	Torrellano		
2008–2010	Elche B		
2010–2011	Quintanar Rey	34	(4)
2011–2013	Novelda	61	(13)
2013–2014	Coruxo	29	(7)
2014–2015	Arroyo	19	(5)
2015	Sant Andreu	12	(1)
2015–2016	San Roque de Lepe	36	(12)
2016–2017	Marbella	18	(1)
2017	AEL	7	(0)
2017–2018	Jumilla	32	(6)
2018–2019	Badalona	32	(5)
2019–2020	Calahorra	26	(8)
2020–2021	Talavera	17	(3)
2021–	Athletic Torrellano	9	(1)
- * Club domestic league appearances and goals as of 21 November 2021

José Alejandro Chacopino Luchoro (born 11 May 1988) is a Spanish professional footballer who plays as a forward for Athletic Club Torrellano.

== Personal life ==
Chacopina is of Italian descent.
