= Dimitrios Terezopoulos =

Greek footballer

Personal information
- Full name: Dimitrios Terezopoulos
- Date of birth: 28 May 1966 (age 60)
- Place of birth: Athens, Greece

Managerial career
- Years: Team
- 2002-2008: Panionios (Youth)
- 2008-2012: Olympiacos (Youth)
- 2013: Korinthos
- 2013–2014: Panionios (Youth)
- 2014: Panionios
- 2015–2016: Asteras Tripolis (Assistant)
- 2016: Asteras Tripolis
- 2017: Rodos
- 2017–2019: PAS Giannina (Youth)
- 2019: Ethnikos Piraeus
- 2020: Α.Ε. Moschato
- 2021: Ionikos U19
- 2021–2022: Ermionida
- 2023–2026: Saronikos Anavyssos
- 2026: Pannaxiakos

Dimitrios Terezopoulos (Greek: Δημήτριος Τερεζόπουλος; born 28 May 1966) is a Greek professional football manager.
