= Dimitrios Patsiogeorgos =

Greek footballer

Personal information
- Full name: Dimitrios Patsiogeorgos
- Date of birth: 6 January 1994 (age 32)
- Place of birth: Katerini, Greece
- Height: 1.90 m (6 ft 3 in)
- Position: Goalkeeper

Team information
- Current team: A.P.S. Zakynthos

Youth career
- –2011: Pierikos

Senior career*
| Years | Team | Apps | (Gls) |
| 2011–2015 | Pierikos | 19 | (0) |
| 2015–2016 | AEL | 3 | (0) |
| 2017 | Pydna Kitros | 10 | (0) |
| 2017–2018 | Volos | 3 | (0) |
| 2018– | Pierikos | 15 | (0) |
- * Club domestic league appearances and goals as of 6 July 2017

Dimitrios Patsiogeorgos (Greek: Δημήτριος Πατσιογεώργος; born 6 January 1994) is a Greek professional footballer who plays as a goalkeeper for A.P.S. Zakynthos.

== Career ==
He started his career from the youth teams of Pierikos, until 1 July 2011, when he signed a professional contract and moved to the first squad. He remained at the club for 3 seasons, making a total of 15 appearances. On 20 January 2015 he signed with AEL. He debuted with his new club on 26 April 2015, in Pampeloponnisiako Stadium in Patras during a Promotion Playoff match against Panachaiki. He was called from the bench to replace the team's first goalkeeper Manolis Apostolidis who was expelled with a red card.
