= Dimos Baxevanidis =

Greek professional footballer

Personal information
- Full name: Dimosthenis Baxevanidis
- Date of birth: 14 April 1988 (age 38)
- Place of birth: Komotini, Greece
- Height: 1.75 m (5 ft 9 in)
- Position: Right-back

Youth career
- 2006–2009: Messouni

Senior career*
Years	Team	Apps	(Gls)
2009–2011	Doxa Drama	77	(4)
2011–2020	Xanthi	186	(3)
2020–2022	Apollon Smyrnis	52	(1)
- * Club domestic league appearances and goals as of 15 May 2022

Dimos Baxevanidis (Greek: Δήμος Μπαξεβανίδης; born 14 April 1988) is a Greek former professional footballer who played as a right-back.

He played for Doxa Drama, Xanthi and Apollon Smyrnis.

== Honours ==
Xanthi

- Greek Cup runner-up: 2014–15
