= Pablo Mazza =

Argentine footballer

Personal information
- Date of birth: 21 December 1987 (age 38)
- Place of birth: Pergamino, Argentina
- Height: 1.75 m (5 ft 9 in)
- Position: Winger

Team information
- Current team: Douglas Haig

Youth career
- 2004–2007: Juventud de Pergamino

Senior career*
Years	Team	Apps	(Gls)
2007–2012	River Plate reserves	35	(12)
2009–2010	→ Juventud de Pergamino (loan)	12	(2)
2012–2014	Douglas Haig	73	(19)
2014–2017	Asteras Tripolis	88	(16)
2017–	Douglas Haig	52	(14)
- * Club domestic league appearances and goals as of 5 February 2018

Pablo Mazza (born 21 December 1987) is an Argentine professional footballer who plays as a winger for Douglas Haig.

== Club career ==
Mazza started from the lower Argentine divisions with Juventud de Pergamino. After playing with the club, showing great potential, it was matter of time before generating interest from several clubs both in Argentina and Europe (including Vitesse Arnhem, SC Heerenveen as well as Genoa, Juventus and Ajax). In 2007, he went on trials with the giants River Plate and stayed. He signed his first contract and served in the reserve team until he stopped due to a severe injury. In early 2009, during the first matches with River Plate reserves, he showed his talent, but suffered a broken ankle in a training session from teammate Mauro Diaz, which took him more than four months of recovery. After recovering from his injury and taking physical and footballing rhythm while on loan at his home club Juventud de Pergamino, he returned to the preseason with the River Plate reserve squad.

In January 2012, Paul Mazza signed for Douglas Haig playing in Primera B Nacional, after a test run, making his debut at United Youth University of San Luis in an honoured match for Omar Jorge, entering the second half.

In the summer of 2014, after playing for the club for two seasons, he refused the club's offer for renewal, and signed a four-year contract with Greek Super League Greece side Asteras Tripolis.
