= Ederson (footballer, born March 1986) =

Brazilian footballer

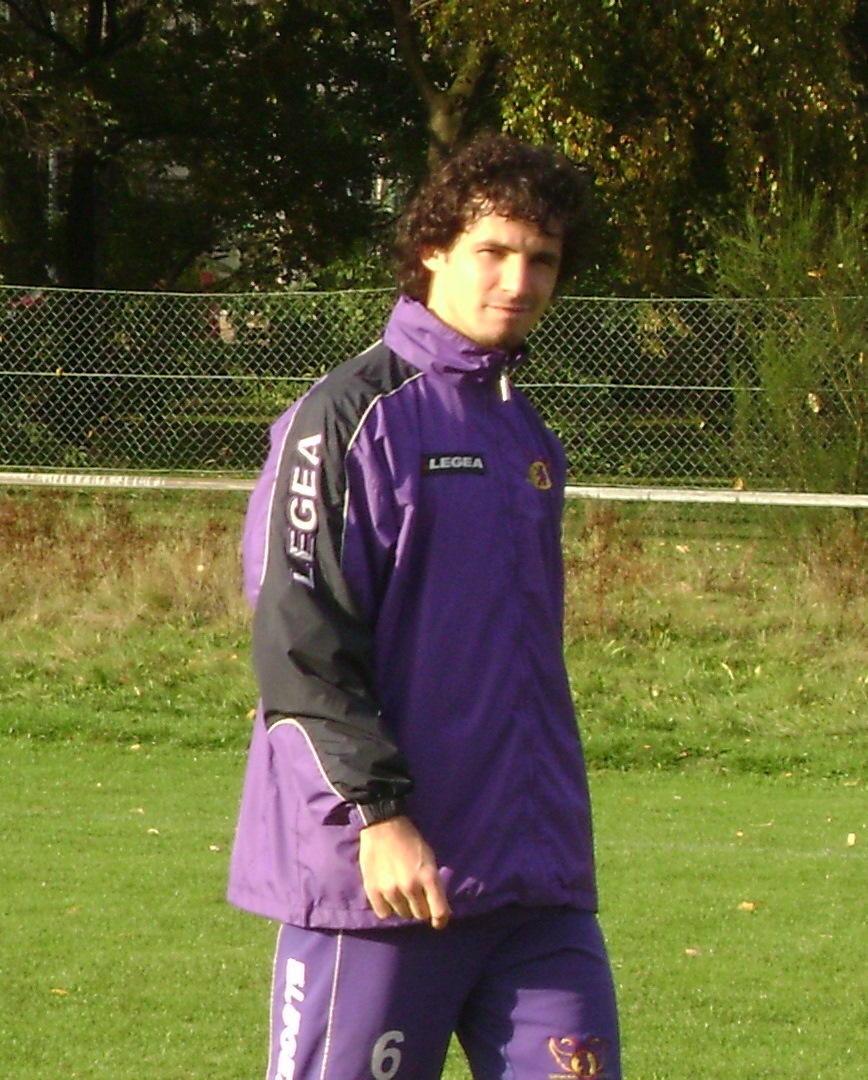

Personal information
- Full name: Ederson Tormena
- Date of birth: March 14, 1986 (age 40)
- Place of birth: Brusque, Brazil
- Height: 1.86 m (6 ft 1 in)
- Position: Defensive midfielder

Senior career*
Years	Team	Apps	(Gls)
2003–2004	Internacional	23	(0)
2004–2007	Juventude	18	(0)
2007–2009	Germinal	40	(5)
2009–2010	KRC Genk	9	(0)
2010–2014	Charleroi	102	(3)
2014–2016	Asteras Tripolis	6	(0)
- * Club domestic league appearances and goals as of 29 September 2015

Ederson Tormena (born March 14, 1986, in Brusque) is a Brazilian footballer who plays as a defensive midfielder. He last played for Asteras Tripolis in Greece.

== Career ==
He signed a 5-year contract in April 2003 for Juventude and on 11 July 2007 for Germinal Beerschot. In January 2009, he signed a four-and-a-half-year deal with KRC Genk, while Wim De Decker made the move to Germinal Beerschot. On 3 May 2010, he signed for R. Charleroi S.C. on loan and signed now a four-year deal.

== Personal life ==
His brother Gustavo Tormena played also with him at K.F.C. Germinal Beerschot.

== Honours ==
Genk

- Belgian Cup: 2008–09
