= Christopher Maboulou =

French footballer (1990–2021)

Personal information
- Date of birth: 19 March 1990
- Place of birth: Montfermeil, France
- Date of death: 10 January 2021 (aged 30)
- Place of death: Montfermeil, France
- Height: 1.85 m (6 ft 1 in)
- Positions: Winger; forward

Senior career*
| Years | Team | Apps | (Gls) |
| 2009–2014 | Châteauroux | 48 | (10) |
| 2014–2016 | Bastia | 29 | (3) |
| 2016–2017 | PAS Giannina | 22 | (3) |
| 2018–2019 | Nancy | 10 | (1) |
| 2020 | Thonon Évian | 2 | (1) |
| Total | | 111 | (18) |
- * Club domestic league appearances and goals

Christopher Maboulou (19 March 1990 – 10 January 2021) was a French professional footballer who played as a winger or as a forward. He played for Ligue 1 side Bastia, multiple Ligue 2 teams, and Greek team PAS Giannina.

== Career ==
Maboulou was born in the Bosquets area of Montfermeil, France. Aged 8, he joined a local football club, and played for them for 10 years. He played 16 games for Châteauroux between 2009 and 2011. In 2011, Maboulou developed a heart problem, which preventing him from playing for two years, as doctors declared him unfit to play. In 2013, Maboulou signed a one-year contract with Châteauroux, and in 2014, he joined Ligue 1 side SC Bastia, on a three-year contract. He scored two goals in a Ligue 1 match against Marseille, as Bastia drew 3–3 with Marseille. In 2014, Maboulou was forced to apologise after scoring a handball goal in a match against Caen. He was released from Bastia at the end of the 2015–16 season, having made nine appearances that season.

In 2015, Maboulou was invited to play for the Congo national team by Claude Le Roy, but could not do so, as he did not have a Congolese passport.

In July 2016, Maboulou signed a three-year contract with PAS Giannina. In the summer of 2017 he was released by PAS Giannina, after disagreements involving late payments of his salary. In 2018, Maboulou signed a one-year contract with Ligue 2 side Nancy. Maboulou had been on trial with Nancy for two and a half months before signing for them. He made his debut for Nancy against Le Havre in September 2018, 16 months after his last competitive appearance.

In 2020, Mabolou made two appearances for Thonon Évian in the Régional 1 league, scoring once, before the season was curtailed due to the COVID-19 pandemic. His contract was not renewed for the 2020–21 season, and he played local football in the Savoie region of France.

During his career, Maboulou made a total of 29 appearances in Ligue 1 and 58 appearances in Ligue 2.

== Death ==
On 10 January 2021, Maboulou had a heart attack while playing a seven-a-side football match with friends in Bondy near Montfermeil. He died in hospital the same day at the age of 30. A minute's applause in his memory was held on 23 January before the Ligue 2 match between Châteauroux and Valenciennes.

== See also ==
- List of association footballers who died while playing
