= Stelios Vasiliou =

Greek footballer

Personal information
- Full name: Stylianos Vasiliou
- Date of birth: 29 April 1991 (age 35)
- Place of birth: Akrefnio, Greece
- Height: 1.81 m (5 ft 11 1/2 in)
- Position: Forward

Team information
- Current team: Kallithea

Senior career*
Years	Team	Apps	(Gls)
2008–2014	Levadiakos	108	(16)
2014–2016	Panetolikos	23	(0)
2016–2018	Levadiakos	22	(5)
2018	Panachaiki	9	(0)
2018	Aittitos Spata	2	(0)
2019–	Kallithea	0	(0)

International career
2010–2011	Greece U19	5	(1)
2012	Greece U21	1	(0)
- * Club domestic league appearances and goals as of 28 November 2018

Stelios Vasiliou (Greek: Στέλιος Βασιλείου; born 29 April 1991) is a Greek professional footballer who plays as a forward for Gamma Ethniki club Kallithea.

== Career ==
Vasiliou started his career in Levadiakos.

However, in January 2014, Vasiliou is probably leaving Levadiakos after 6.5 years. The rupture in relations with the administration of the club is final. The young striker did not accept the new proposal was made for a two-year extension of his contract, which expires in December 2014. The player is resentful as it considers that the limited participation time of the season (11 appearances in the League) was the main reason not to sign a new contract. Levadiakos would probably seek to sell him during the summer transfer window, as from 1 July 2014 the player is entitled to sign to a club of his choice.

On 17 September 2014, he signed a three years' contract with Panetolikos for an undisclosed fee. On 22 July 2016, after 18 months with Panetolikos, he signed a year contract with his former club. On 26 February 2017, he scored against PAS Giannina sealing a 2–1 home win in his club's effort to avoid relegation. It was his first goal for the club since January 2013. Moreover, the punishment of his teammate Vangelis Mantzios for doping, has been his passport in the basic line-up of the club where he scored in three consecutives games including a home Super League game against champions Olympiakos.

On 4 January 2018, he signed with Football League club Panachaiki for a one-and-a-half-year contract for an undisclosed fee.

On 11 August 2018, he moved to newly promoted side Aittitos Spata on a free transfer.
