= Vasilios Angelopoulos =

Greek footballer (born 1997)

Personal information
- Full name: Vasilios Angelopoulos
- Date of birth: 12 February 1997 (age 29)
- Place of birth: Athens, Greece
- Height: 1.78 m (5 ft 10 in)
- Position: Defensive midfielder

Team information
- Current team: AEZ Zakakiou
- Number: 10

Youth career
- –2014: Panathinaikos

Senior career*
Years	Team	Apps	(Gls)
2014–2016	Panathinaikos	2	(0)
2016–2017	Iraklis	19	(1)
2017–2018	Platanias	16	(0)
2018–2019	Aris Limassol	27	(0)
2019–2020	ASIL Lysi	15	(0)
2020–2021	Aspropyrgos	0	(0)
2021	Doxa Drama	18	(3)
2021–2022	A.E. Kifisia	9	(0)
2022–2023	Proodeftiki	21	(0)
2023–25	Peyia 2014	53	(6)
2025-	AEZ Zakakiou	27	(1)

International career
2013–2014	Greece U17	7	(2)
2014–2015	Greece U18	7	(1)
2015–2016	Greece U19	10	(0)
2017	Greece U21	4	(0)
- * Club domestic league appearances and goals as of 3 May 2026

Vasilios Angelopoulos (Greek: Βασίλειος Αγγελόπουλος; born 12 February 1997) is a Greek professional footballer who plays as a defensive midfielder for Cypriot Second Division club AEZ Zakakiou.

== Club career ==
On 13 March 2014, Angelopoulos, along with nine other players, signed his first professional contract with Panathinaikos. On 13 April 2014, he made his first team debut, in a 3–1 away defeat against Xanthi.

As of July 22, Angelopoulos is a player of Iraklis On December 5, Angelopoulos scored his first professional goal in the Super League Greece against PAS Giannina.

Ahead of the 2019–20 season, Angelopoulos joined ASIL Lysi.
