= Dimitrios Ferfelis =

German-Greek footballer

Personal information
- Date of birth: 5 April 1993 (age 33)
- Place of birth: Delmenhorst, Germany
- Height: 1.92 m (6 ft 4 in)
- Position: Forward

Youth career
- 1999–2004: TuS Hasbergen
- 2004–2006: DTB Delmenhorst
- 2006–2007: TuS Heidkrug
- 2007–2012: Werder Bremen

Senior career*
Years	Team	Apps	(Gls)
2012–2014	TuS Koblenz	52	(17)
2014–2015	PEC Zwolle	5	(0)
2015–2016	PAS Giannina	13	(0)
2017	PAS Lamia	8	(1)
2017–2018	FSV Zwickau	9	(0)
2018–2019	Wormatia Worms	26	(6)
2019–2020	Gießen	8	(2)
2020–2023	Atlas Delmenhorst	50	(16)
2023–2024	Heeslinger SC	23	(3)
- * Club domestic league appearances and goals as of 04:50, 4 July 2024 (UTC)

Dimitrios Ferfelis (Greek: Δημήτριος Φερφελής; born 5 April 1993) is a German-Greek footballer who most recently played as a forward for Heeslinger SC.

== Career ==
Ferfelis started his career playing for TuS Koblenz in German Regionalliga. On 10 June 2014, signed a three-year contract with Greek Super League club PAS Giannina. On 29 December 2016, he transferred to PAS Lamia 1964.
