= Giannis Charontakis =

Greek footballer (born 1995)

Personal information
- Full name: Ioannis Charontakis
- Date of birth: 7 August 1995 (age 31)
- Place of birth: Athens, Greece
- Height: 1.73 m (5 ft 8 in)
- Position: Left-back

Youth career
- –2010: Panathinaikos

Senior career*
Years	Team	Apps	(Gls)
2010–2011	Ajax Tavros	0	(0)
2011–2012	Ethnikos Asteras	10	(0)
2012–2014	Kallithea	1	(0)
2014–2015	Panionios	0	(0)
2015	Alimos	3	(0)
2016	Trikala	14	(0)
2016	Veria	10	(0)
2017	Vojvodina	0	(0)
2018–2019	Ajaccio	0	(0)
2018–2019	Ajaccio II	1	(0)
- * Club domestic league appearances and goals as of 2 February 2017

Giannis Charontakis (Greek: Γιάννης Χαροντάκης; born 7 August 1995) is a Greek professional footballer who plays as a left-back.

== Career ==
Charontakis started his professional career in Ajax Tavros during 2010–11 football season. The following season, he moved on a free transfer to Ethnikos Asteras in Football League where he played in 10 matches. He later moved on to Kallithea again on a free transfer where he played just one time. In summer transfer window of 2014, Charontakis signed a contract with Super League Greece side Panionios but he failed to make an appearance for the club. During winter transfer windows of 2015, he moved on a free transfer to Alimos where he played 3 times. In July 2015, he moved to Trikala on a free transfer and made 14 appearances for the club.

On 25 June 2016, Charontakis signed a two-year-contract with Greek Super League side Veria.

On 13 February 2017 he signed with Serbian club Vojvodina. However, just 10 days later, he terminated his contract and left the club.

On 10 January 2018 he signed with Ligue 2 club AC Ajaccio.
