= Halifa Soulé =

Comorian footballer (born 1990)

Personal information
- Full name: Mohamed Halifa Soulé
- Date of birth: 12 November 1990 (age 35)
- Place of birth: Gonesse, France
- Height: 1.72 m (5 ft 7 1/2 in)
- Position: Attacking midfielder

Team information
- Current team: Ayia Napa

Senior career*
Years	Team	Apps	(Gls)
2009–2011	L'Entente SSG	58	(1)
2011–2012	Albi	30	(6)
2012–2016	Béziers	74	(4)
2016	OFI Crete	0	(0)
2017	Veria	5	(1)
2017–	Ayia Napa	31	(1)

International career^{‡}
2011–	Comoros	10	(0)
- * Club domestic league appearances and goals as of 31 May 2019 ‡ National team caps and goals as of 30 June 2018

Mohamed Halifa Soulé (born 12 November 1990) is a Comorian international footballer who plays for Ayia Napa FC, as an attacking midfielder.

== Career ==
Soulé has played club football for L'Entente SSG, Albi, Béziers and OFI Crete. On 30 December 2016, Soulé signed a 6-month contract with Super League Greece club Veria.

He made his international debut for Comoros in 2011.
