= Georgios Bantis =

Greek footballer (born 1985)

Giorgos Bantis
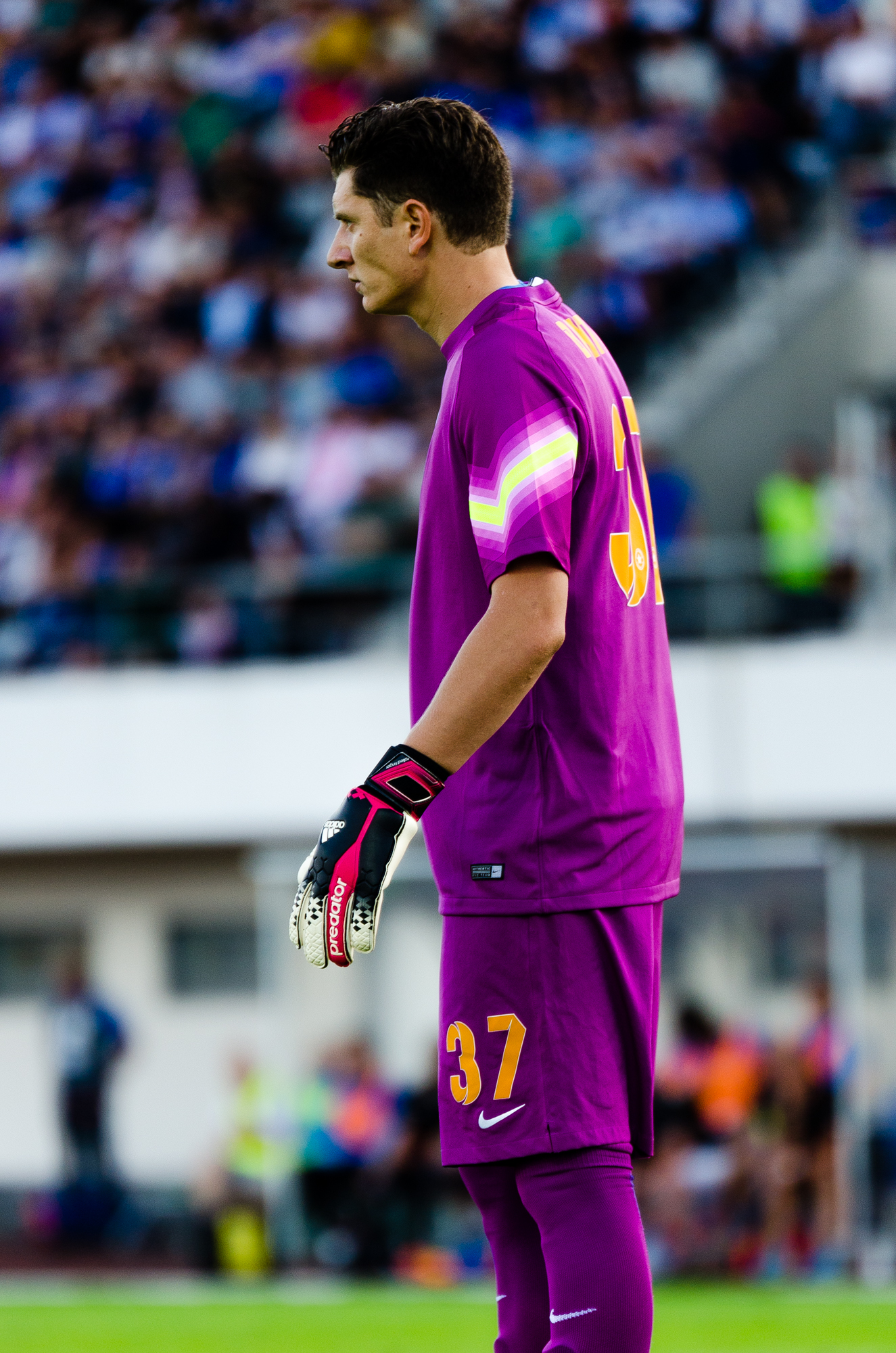
- Bantis during a match against RoPS, 17 July 2014.

Personal information
- Full name: Georgios Bantis
- Date of birth: 30 April 1985 (age 41)
- Place of birth: Ierissos, Greece
- Height: 1.88 m (6 ft 2 in)
- Position: Goalkeeper

Youth career
- 1997–2001: Akanthos
- 2001–2005: Iraklis

Senior career*
Years	Team	Apps	(Gls)
2005–2011	Iraklis	21	(0)
2011–2016	Asteras Tripolis	50	(0)
2016–2017	Omonia	0	(0)
2017–2018	Panionios	5	(0)
2018–2019	Lamia	0	(0)
- * Club domestic league appearances and goals as of 8 July 2018

Georgios Bantis (Greek: Γεώργιος Μπαντής; born 30 April 1985) is a Greek former professional footballer who played as a goalkeeper.

== Career ==
Bantis started his career in the academies of the football team of his hometown Akanthos F.C. Ierissos Chalkidiki. In 2001, he joined the academy of Iraklis and from the 2005–06 season he belongs to the professional squad. In the summer of 2011, he signed with Asteras Tripolis a three years' contract. On 20 May 2014 he renewed his contract for two more years. In November 2016 he moved to Omonia.
