= Antonis Iliadis =

Greek footballer

Personal information
- Full name: Antonios Iliadis
- Date of birth: 27 July 1993 (age 33)
- Place of birth: Imathia, Greece
- Height: 1.75 m (5 ft 9 in)
- Position: Left winger

Senior career*
| Years | Team | Apps | (Gls) |
| 2010–2011 | Lefkadia | | |
| 2012–2014 | Makrochori | 0 | (0) |
| 2014–2016 | PAS Giannina | 18 | (1) |
| 2016–2017 | Platanias | 0 | (0) |
| 2017 | Iraklis | 3 | (0) |
| 2018 | Apollon Pontus | 13 | (1) |
| 2018 | Trikala | 1 | (0) |
| 2019 | Irodotos | 14 | (1) |
- * Club domestic league appearances and goals as of 19:02, 17 April 2019 (UTC)

Antonis Iliadis (Greek: Αντώνης Ηλιάδης, born 27 July 1993) is a Greek professional footballer who plays as a left winger.

== Club career ==
Iliadis began his professional career at Makrochori. He played in PAS Giannina from 2014 to 2016 at Super League Greece. On 6 June 2016, he signed with Platanias on a three-year deal. After making only 3 appearances he left the club by mutual consent. On 9 January 2017 he joined Iraklis.
