= Athanasios Panteliadis =

Greek footballer (born in 1987)

Thanasis Panteliadis
Personal information
- Full name: Athanasios Panteliadis
- Date of birth: 6 September 1987 (age 39)
- Place of birth: Katerini, Greece
- Height: 1.86 m (6 ft 1 in)
- Position: Left-back

Team information
- Current team: Pierikos
- Number: 3

Youth career
- 2005–2007: Ethnikos Katerini
- 2007: Veria

Senior career*
Years	Team	Apps	(Gls)
2007–2010	Pierikos	45	(3)
2010–2013	Panserraikos	65	(1)
2013–2014	Apollon Smyrnis	27	(1)
2014–2016	Asteras Tripolis	34	(0)
2016–2017	Omonia	7	(0)
2017	→ Atromitos (loan)	3	(0)
2017–2018	Lamia	27	(0)
2018–2020	Levadiakos	28	(0)
2020–2021	Xanthi	16	(0)
2021–	Pierikos	27	(1)
- * Club domestic league appearances and goals as of 27 April 2022

Athanasios Panteliadis (Greek: Αθανάσιος Παντελιάδης; born 6 September 1987) is a Greek professional footballer who plays as a left-back for Super League 2 club Pierikos.

== Career ==
Panteliadis started as an amateur in his hometown team Ethnikos Katerini in which he played in the local league. In 2007, he was signed to Veria. In 2007, he signed a contract with Pierikos. In 2010, he signed with Panserraikos, and he left in 2013 to sign a contract with Apollon Smyrnis. In summer 2014 he signed a 3-year contract with Asteras Tripoli. In summer 2016 he signed a contract with Omonia.

== Personal life ==
Panteliadis has two daughters and he currently lives with his wife and his kids in Tripoli, Greece.
