= 2020–21 PAS Giannina F.C. season =

Greek football club season

PAS Giannina
2020–21 season
- Chairman: Giorgos Christovasilis
- Manager: Argirios Giannikis
- Stadium: Zosimades Stadium, Ioannina
- Super League: 9th
- Greek Cup: Semi-finals eliminated by Olympiacos
- Top goalscorer: League: Georgios Pamlidis (7 goals); All: Georgios Pamlidis (8 goals)
Home colours	Away colours	Third colours

The 2020–21 season was PAS Giannina F.C.'s 25th competitive season in the top flight of Greek football, 10th season in the Super League Greece, and 55th year in existence as a football club. They also competed in the Greek Cup, where they were knocked out in the semi-finals by Olympiacos.

== Players ==
updated 14 February 2021

No.	Name	Nationality	Position(s)	Place of birth	Date of birth	Signed from	Notes
Goalkeepers
13	Yuri Lodygin	(Russia) (Greece)	GK	Vladimir, Russian SFSR, Soviet Union	26 May 1990	Free	
33	Lefteris Choutesiotis (VC2)	(Greece)	GK	Makrychori, Greece	20 July 1994	(Greece) Olympiakos	
99	Vasilis Athanasiou	(Greece)	GK	Aigio, Greece	24 July 1999	(Italy) Mantova	
Defenders
2	Manolis Saliakas	(Greece)	RB	Heraklion, Greece	12 September 1996	(Greece) PAS Lamia	
4	Epaminondas Pantelakis	(Greece)	CB	Chania, Crete, Greece	10 February 1995	(Greece) Panathinaikos	
6	Giannis Kargas (VC3)	(Greece)	CB	Kilkis, Greece	9 December 1994	(Bulgaria) Levski Sofia	
15	Rodrigo Erramuspe	(Argentina)	CB	Mar del Plata, Argentina	3 May 1990	(Argentina) Belgrano	
23	Stavros Pilios	(Greece)	LB	Ioannina, Greece	10 December 2000	(Greece) PAS Giannina U-19	
24	Antonis Oikonomopoulos	(Greece)	RB	Athens, Greece	9 May 1998	(Greece) Apollon Smyrnis	
25	Pantelis Panourgias	(Greece)	CB	Athens, Greece	13 April 1998	(Netherlands) PEC Zwolle	
43	Marvin Peersman	(Belgium)	LB	Wilrijk, Belgium	10 February 1991	(Israel) Hapoel Tel Aviv	
Midfielders
7	Alexandros Kartalis	(Greece)	MF	Nuremberg, Germany	29 January 1995	(Germany) FSV Zwickau	
8	Fabricio Brener	(Argentina)	MF	San Vicente, Argentina	26 May 1998	(Argentina) Belgrano	Loan
9	Christos Eleftheriadis	(Greece)	CM / RLW	Aridaia, Greece	30 September 1991	(Greece) Panachaiki	
10	Juan Dominguez	(Spain)	MF	Pontedeume, Spain	8 January 1990	(Austria) Sturm Graz	
17	Vladyslav Naumets	(Ukraine)	MF	Luhansk, Ukraine	7 March 1999	Free	
19	Alexandros Lolis	(Greece)	MF	Ladochori Thesprotias, Greece	5 September 2002	(Greece) PAS Giannina U-17	
21	Fabry Castro (VC)	(Colombia)	MF	Santa Bárbara, Colombia	21 February 1992	(Switzerland) Servette FC	
22	Stefanos Siontis (C)	(Greece)	CM	Ioannina, Greece	4 September 1987	(Greece) Kassiopi	
28	Giorgos Xydas	(Greece)	MF	Chios, Greece	14 April 1997	(Greece) Kissamikos	
30	Alexis Triadis	(Greece)	MF	Herdecke, Germany	16 May 1997	Free	
47	Pavlos Grosdanis	(Greece)	MF	Florina, Greece	3 April 2002	(Greece) PAS Giannina U-17	
80	Angelos Liasos	(Greece)	CM	Florina, Greece	26 May 2000	(Greece) PAS Giannina U-20	
Forwards
11	Giorgos Doumtsis	(Greece)	FW	Florina, Greece	4 March 2000	(Greece) PAOK	
12	Sandi Križman	(Croatia)	FW	Pula, SR Croatia, SFR Yugoslavia	17 August 1989	(Greece) AEL	
14	Georgios Pamlidis	(Greece)	FW	Katerini, Greece	13 November 1993	(Greece) Kassiopi	
20	Nicolae Milinceanu	(Moldova)	FW	Chișinău, Moldova	1 August 1992	(Liechtenstein) FC Vaduz	
Left during Winter Transfer Window
5	Giorgos Gogos	(Greece)	CB	Ioannina, Greece	11 July 2001	(Greece) PAS Giannina U-20	
92	Maxim Natynchik	(Belarus)	FW	Pinsk, Belarus	29 January 2002	(Belarus) Dynamo Brest	
1	Makis Giannikoglou	(Greece)	GK	Kavala, Greece	25 March 1993	(Greece) AEK Athens	
29	Jean-Baptiste Léo	(France)	FW	Lyon, France	3 May 1996	(Greece) Kissamikos	

=== International players ===
- Yuri Lodygin (Russia men's, Greece U-21)
- (Greece) Serafeim Giannikoglou (U-17)
- (Croatia) Sandi Križman (U-21/20/19/18)
- (Greece) Stefanos Siontis (U-19)
- (Ukraine) Vladyslav Naumets (U-19/18/17)
- (Greece) Giorgos Gogos (U-17)
- (Greece) Antonis Oikonomopoulos (U-17)
- (Greece) Vasilis Athanasiou (U-19)
- (Greece) Giorgos Xydas (U-19)
- (Greece) Pantelis Panourgias (U-19)
- (Greece) Giorgos Doumtsis (U-19)
- (Greece) Pavlos Grosdanis (U-17)
- (Greece) Epaminondas Pantelakis (U-19)
- (Greece) Lefteris Choutesiotis (U-21)
- (Greece) Manolis Saliakas (men's, U-21/19/18/17)
- (Belgium) Marvin Peersman (U-19)
- (Belarus) Maxim Natynchik (U-17)
- (Moldova) Nicolae Milinceanu (men's, U-21)
- (Greece) Alexandros Lolis (U-21)

=== Foreign players ===
EU Nationals
- (Croatia) (Europe) Sandi Križman
- (France) (Europe) Jean-Baptiste Léo
- (Belgium) (Europe) Marvin Peersman
- (Spain) (Europe) Juan Dominguez

EU Nationals (Dual Citizenship)
- (Russia) (Greece) (Europe) Yuri Lodygin

Non-EU Nationals
- (Colombia) Fabry Castro
- (Ukraine) Vladyslav Naumets
- (Argentina) Rodrigo Erramuspe
- (Argentina) Fabricio Brener
- (Belarus) Maxim Natynchik
- (Moldova) Nicolae Milinceanu

== Personnel ==
=== Management ===
Position	Staff
Majority Owner	Giorgos Christovasilis
President and CEO	Giorgos Christovasilis
Director of Football	Dimitris Niarchakos (until 16 November 2020)
Director of Office	Alekos Potsis
Head of Ticket Department	Andreas Potsis
Press & Media Office	Babis Karvelis
Marketing Office	Kostas Pediaditakis

=== Coaching staff ===
Position	Name
Head Coach	Argirios Giannikis
Assistant Coach	Nikos Badimas
Fitness Coach	Ioannis Dourountos
Goalkeepers Coach	Spiros Christopoulos

=== medical staff ===
Position	Name
Head doctor	Stavros Restanis
Physio	Filippos Skordos

=== Academy ===
Position	Name
Head of Youth Development	Nikos Badimas
Head Coach U-19	Christos Agelis
Head Coach U-17	Michalis Bolos
Head Coach U-15	
Fitness Coach	Giannis Lolis
Goalkeepers Coach	Nikos Gortzis
Scout	Dimitris Stoukas

== Transfers ==
=== Summer ===
==== In ====
No	Pos	Player	Transferred from	Fee	Date	Source
2	RB	Manolis Saliakas	PAS Lamia	-	31 July 2020	
-	CB	Spyros Vasilakis	Souli Paramythia	Loan return	1 July 2020	
-	MF	Orest Kuzyk	Desna Chernihiv	Loan return		
43	LB	Marvin Peersman	Hapoel Tel Aviv	-	7 August 2020	
6	CB	Giannis Kargas	Levski Sofia	-	19 August 2020	
10	MF	Juan Dominguez	Sturm Graz	-	29 August 2020	
15	CB	Rodrigo Erramuspe	Belgrano	-	5 September 2020	
92	FW	Maxim Natynchik	Dynamo Brest	-	5 September 2020	
11	FW	Giorgos Doumtsis	PAOK	-	11 September 2020	
99	GK	Vasilis Athanasiou	Mantova	-	29 September 2020	
8	MF	Fabricio Brener	Belgrano	Loan	6 October 2020	

==== Out ====
No	Pos	Player	Transferred to	Fee	Date	Source
2	RB	Michalis Boukouvalas	Released	-	19 July 2020	
27	LB	Lasha Shergelashvili	Released	-	19 July 2020	
44	CB	Apostolos Skondras	Released	-	19 July 2020	
77	RB	Alexis Apostolopoulos	Released	-	19 July 2020	
12	GK	Kostas Peristeridis	Released	-	19 July 2020	
20	CB	Angelos Zioulis	Released	-	17 August 2020	
88	CM	Alexandros Nikolias	Olympiacos		17 August 2020	
-	CB	Spyros Vasilakis	PAS Acheron Kanallaki	-	26 August 2020	
-	MF	Orest Kuzyk	Pafos	-	6 September 2020	

For recent transfers, see

=== Winter ===
==== In ====
No	Pos	Player	Transferred from	Fee	Date	Source
20	FW	Nicolae Milinceanu	FC Vaduz	Undisclosed	15 January 2021	
13	GK	Yuri Lodygin	Free	-	20 January 2021	
30	MF	Alexis Triadis	-	-	2 February 2021	

==== Out ====
No	Pos	Player	Transferred to	Fee	Date	Source
5	CB	Giorgos Gogos	Released	-	31 December 2020	
92	FW	Maxim Natynchik	Released	-	27 January 20221	
1	GK	Makis Giannikoglou	FK Sūduva	-	14 February 2021	
29	FW	Jean-Baptiste Léo	Riga FC	Undisclosed	3 March 2021	

== Alternative ==
for friendlies	Retro

== Pre-season and friendlies ==
Win Draw Loss Upcoming fixture

20 August 2020 Friendly	Atromitos	3-0	PAS Giannina	Peristeri, Athens
19:30	Agayev 17'; Vellios 52' (pen.); Rabello 78'	Report		Stadium: Peristeri Stadium

24 August 2020 Friendly	Olympiacos	1-0	PAS Giannina	Agios Ioannis Rentis
19:00	Hassan 87'	Report		Stadium: Olympiacos training ground Attendance: 0 (closed doors)

3 September 2020 Friendly	PAS Giannina	4-1	Thesprotos	Ioannina
18:15	Eleftheriadis 50', 90'; Grosdanis 75'; Léo 85'	Report	Lucas Batata 61'	Stadium: PEAKI; Referee: Konstantinos Neos

5 September 2020 Friendly	Panetolikos	0–1	PAS Giannina	Agrinio
18:15		Report	Naumets 79'	Stadium: Panetolikos Stadium; Referee: Spyros Kazanas

11 September 2020 Friendly	PAS Giannina	1-3	Levadiakos	Ioannina
18:00	Križman 41'	Report	Mytidis 9', 28'; Nikas 78'	Stadium: PEAKI; Referee: Leonidas Tzovas

16 September 2020 Friendly	PAS Giannina	1-0	Karaiskakis	Ioannina
18:00	Léo 35'	Report		Stadium: Zosimades Stadium; Referee: Dimitrios Chatzipanagiotou

20 September 2020 Friendly	Larissa	0–1	PAS Giannina	Kalabaka
17:30		Report	Križman 59'	Stadium: Kalabaka Stadium; Referee: Vagelis Kontinos

9 October 2020 Friendly	Veria	3-0	PAS Giannina	Veria
17:00	Loukinas 28' (pen.), 40'; Pasas 51'	Report		Stadium: Veria Stadium; Referee: Dimitris Maloutas

== Competitions ==
=== League table ===
Pos	Team	Pld	W	D	L	GF	GA	GD	Pts	Qualification
6	Asteras Tripolis	26	11	9	6	27	25	+2	42	Qualification for the Play-off round
7	Volos	26	8	9	9	26	32	−6	33	Qualification for the Play-out round
8	PAS Giannina	26	8	7	11	23	26	−3	31	Qualification for the Play-out round
9	Apollon Smyrnis	26	8	4	14	26	35	−9	28 (Note: Head to head points: Apollon 4, Atromitos 1.)	Qualification for the Play-out round
10	Atromitos	26	6	10	10	24	35	−11	28	Qualification for the Play-out round

Source: Super League Greece
Rules for classification: 1) Points; 2) Head-to-head points; 3) Head-to-head goal difference; 4) Goals scored; 5) Goals against.

==== Results summary ====
Overall								Home						Away					
Pld	W	D	L	GF	GA	GD	Pts	W	D	L	GF	GA	GD	W	D	L	GF	GA	GD
26	8	7	11	23	26	−3	31	3	4	6	9	13	−4	5	3	5	14	13	+1

=== Fixtures ===
Win Draw Loss Upcoming fixture

21 October 2020 1	Apollon Smyrnis	1–2	PAS Giannina	Athens
17:15	Fatjon (yellow card) 11'; Domingues (yellow card) 38'; Ioannidis 81'; Lisgaras (yellow card) 90+4'; Tsabouris (yellow card) 90+5'	Report	Pantelakis (yellow card) 30'; Pamlidis 44'; Eleftheriadis 45+3'; Peersman (yellow card) 63'; Kargas (yellow card) 80'; Choutesiotis (yellow card) 90+9'	Stadium: Georgios Kamaras Stadium; Attendance: 0 (closed doors); Referee: Aristidis Vatsios

4 November 2020 2	PAS Giannina	1–2	Larissa	Ioannina
17:15	Lolis (yellow card) 13' (yellow-red card) 55'; Léo 61'; Križman (yellow card) 90+6'; Siontis (yellow card) 90+7'	Report	Platellas (yellow card) 27'; Pinakas 66', 85'; Torje (yellow card) 78'; Filip (yellow card) 80'; Younés (yellow card) 90+3'	Stadium: Zosimades Stadium; Attendance: 0 (closed doors); Referee: Georgios Vreskas

27 September 2020 3	Aris Thessaloniki	2–2	PAS Giannina	Thessaloniki
16:00	Fetfatzidis (yellow card) 43'; Fetfatzidis 48'; Matilla 67'; Jeggo (yellow card) 78'; Rose (yellow card) 83'; Mancini (yellow card) 86'	Report	Naumets 15'; Pantelakis 22'; Fabry (yellow card) 46'; Kartalis (yellow card) 55'; Pantelakis (yellow card) 66'; Erramuspe (yellow card) 72'; Peersman (yellow card) 90'	Stadium: Kleanthis Vikelidis Stadium; Attendance: 0 (closed doors); Referee: Agelos Evangelou

4 October 2020 4	PAS Giannina	1–1	Olympiacos	Ioannina
20:30	Pamlidis 5'; Erramuspe (yellow card) 42'; Križman (yellow card) 72'	Report	Camara (yellow card) 22'; El-Arabi 51'; Ba (yellow card) 88'	Stadium: Zosimades Stadium; Attendance: 0 (closed doors); Referee: Dimitris Karantonis

17 October 2020 5	Volos	2–1	PAS Giannina	Volos
16:00	Barrientos (yellow card) 40'; Barrientos 56' (pen.); Colombo (yellow card) 73'; Warda 77'	Report	Pamlidis 3'; Siontis (yellow card) 44'; Saliakas (yellow card) 55'; Peersman (yellow card) 66'	Stadium: Panthessaliko Stadium; Attendance: 0 (closed doors); Referee: Petros Tsagarakis

25 October 2020 6	PAS Giannina	0–1	AEK Athens	Ioannina
20:30	Choutesiotis (yellow card) 15'; Kartalis (yellow card) 56'; Siontis (yellow card) 57'; Fabry (yellow card) 68'	Report	Ansarifard 16' (pen.) Tanković (yellow card) 47' Ansarifard (yellow card) 52' Krstičić (yellow card) 69' Tsintotas (yellow card) 90+4' Insúa (yellow card) 90+5'	Stadium: Zosimades Stadium; Attendance: 0 (closed doors); Referee: Aristotelis Diamantopoulos

31 October 2020 7	Atromitos	0–2	PAS Giannina	Peristeri, Athens
17:15	Bušuladžić (yellow card) 49'; Matić (yellow card) 64'; Tomašević (yellow card) 65'	Report	Kartalis (yellow card) 31'; Eleftheriadis 37'; Kargas (yellow card) 45+2'; Kargas 70'; Léo (yellow card) 87'	Stadium: Peristeri Stadium; Attendance: 0 (closed doors); Referee: Efstathios Gortsilas

7 November 2020 8	PAS Giannina	0–0	Panetolikos	Ioannina
17:15	Kargas (yellow card) 15'; Saliakas (yellow card) 55'	Report	Liavas (yellow card) 21'; Konstantopoulos (yellow card) 79'	Stadium: Zosimades Stadium; Attendance: 0 (closed doors); Referee: Agelos Evangelou

22 November 2020 9	PAOK	2–1	PAS Giannina	Thessaloniki
19:30	Esiti (yellow card) 30'; Świderski 52'; El Kaddouri (yellow card) 83'; Živković (yellow card) 83'; El Kaddouri 90+1'	Report	Erramuspe 31'; Erramuspe (yellow card) 45+2' (yellow-red card) 57'; Kartalis (yellow card) 75'; Pantelakis (yellow card) 90'	Stadium: Toumba; Attendance: 0 (closed doors); Referee: Anastasios Sidiropoulos

29 November 2020 10	OFI	2–1	PAS Giannina	Heraklion, Crete
17:00	Grivas (yellow card) 14'; Sturgeon 20'; Diamantis (yellow card) 42'; Neira 68' (pen.); Sotiriou (yellow card) 84'	Report	Saliakas (yellow card) 39'; Eleftheriadis 45+1'; Oikonomopoulos (yellow card) 73'	Stadium: Theodoros Vardinogiannis; Attendance: 0 (closed doors); Referee: Athanasios Tzilos

6 December 2020 11	PAS Giannina	2–0	Lamia	Ioannina
17:15	Eleftheriadis 30'; Eleftheriadis (yellow card) 81'; Pamlidis 87' (pen.); Kartalis (yellow card) 90'; Oikonomopoulos (yellow card) 90'; Naumets (yellow card) 90+5'	Report	Adejo (yellow card) 25'; Karamanos (yellow card) 63'; Saramantas (yellow card) 66'; Skondras (yellow card) 82'; Bejarano (yellow card) 88'; Tzanetopoulos (yellow card) 90'	Stadium: Zosimades Stadium; Attendance: 0 (closed doors); Referee: Aristotelis Diamantopoulos

12 December 2020 12	Panathinaikos	2–0	PAS Giannina	Athens
19:30	Villafáñez 33' (pen.); Vélez (yellow card) 43'; Alexandropoulos (yellow card) 45+2'; Aitor 59'; Macheda (yellow card) 61'; Zagaritis (yellow card) 84'	Report	Saliakas (yellow card) 32'; Kargas (yellow card) 41'; Kartalis (yellow card) 89'	Stadium: Leoforos Stadium; Attendance: 0 (closed doors); Referee: Ioannis Papadopoulos

21 December 2020 13	PAS Giannina	2–2	Asteras Tripolis	Ioannina
17:15	Pamlidis 23'; Siontis (red card) 54'; Križman 87'; Choutesiotis (yellow card) 90+2'	Report	Munafo 34'; Valiente (yellow card) 46'; Barrales (yellow card) 57'; Fernández 84'; Álvarez (yellow card) 85'; Tsiftsis (yellow card) 90'	Stadium: Zosimades Stadium; Attendance: 0 (closed doors); Referee: Agelos Evangelou

3 January 2021 14	PAS Giannina	1–3	Apollon Smyrnis	Ioannina
17:15	Lisgaras 7' (o.g.); Pantelakis (yellow card) 41'; Oikonomopoulos (yellow card) 65'	Report	Andoni (yellow card) 13'; Andoni 43' (pen.); Slivka (yellow card) 64'; Ioannidis 72'; Vitlis (yellow card) 82'; Tsiloulis 83'	Stadium: Zosimades Stadium; Attendance: 0 (closed doors); Referee: Praxitelis Zachariadis

6 January 2021 15	Larissa	0–0	PAS Giannina	Larissa
17:15	Filip (yellow card) 24'; Sparv (yellow card) 38'	Report	Križman (yellow card) 36'; Kargas (yellow card) 88'	Stadium: Alcazar Stadium; Attendance: 0 (closed doors); Referee: Vasilios Fotias

11 January 2021 16	PAS Giannina	0-0	Aris Thessaloniki	Ioannina
17:15	Peersman (yellow card) 41'; Pamlidis (yellow card) 54'; Križman (yellow card) 76'	Report	Ganea (yellow card) 29'; Bruno Gama (yellow card) 39'	Stadium: Zosimades Stadium; Attendance: 0 (closed doors); Referee: Petros Tsagarakis

17 January 2021 17	Olympiacos	1-0	PAS Giannina	Piraeus
15:00	Reabciuk (yellow card) 82'; Hassan 90+3'	Report	Choutesiotis (yellow card) 19'; Erramuspe (yellow card) 40'; Peersman (yellow card) 57'; Saliakas (yellow card) 80'; Athanasiou (yellow card) 90+1'	Stadium: Karaiskakis Stadium; Attendance: 0 (closed doors); Referee: Aristotelis Diamantopoulos

24 January 2021 18	PAS Giannina	0-1	Volos	Ioannina
17:15	Erramuspe (yellow card) 12'; Kargas (yellow card) 43'; Pantelakis (yellow card) 59'	Report	Douvikas 14' (pen.); Grillo (yellow card) 33'; Tekio (yellow card) 54'; Perea (yellow card) 73'; Douvikas (yellow card) 77'; Bartolo (yellow card) 77'; Tsokanis (yellow card) 88'; Mitoglou (yellow card) 90+3'	Stadium: Zosimades Stadium; Attendance: 0 (closed doors); Referee: Efstathios Gortzilas

27 January 2021 19	AEK Athens	0-2	PAS Giannina	Marousi
17:15	Insúa (yellow card) 21'; Chyhrynskyi (yellow card) 34'	Report	Križman 33' (pen.); Kargas (yellow card) 53'; Oikonomopoulos (yellow card) 73'; Lodygin (yellow card) 82'; Léo 87'; Eleftheriadis (yellow card) 88'	Stadium: Olympic Stadium; Attendance: 0 (closed doors); Referee: Evangelos Manouchos

31 January 2021 20	PAS Giannina	0-1	Atromitos	Ioannina
17:15	Liasos (yellow card) 6'; Kargas (yellow card) 88'	Report	Agayev 5'; Edomwonyi (yellow card) 33'; Goutas (yellow card) 64'; Salomon (yellow card) 85'	Stadium: Zosimades Stadium; Attendance: 0 (closed doors); Referee: Aristidis Vatsios

8 February 2021 21	Panetolikos	1-2	PAS Giannina	Agrinio
19:30	Ariyibi 5'; Díaz (yellow card) 37'; Hélder Barbosa (yellow card) 75'	Report	Križman 54' (pen.); Liasos (yellow card) 58'; Domínguez (yellow card) 61'; Kargas 84'	Stadium: Panetolikos Stadium; Attendance: 0 (closed doors); Referee: Agelos Evangelou

15 February 2021 22	PAS Giannina	0-2	PAOK	Peristeri, Athens
17:15	Domínguez (yellow card) 35'; Oikonomopoulos (yellow card) 61'	Report	Živković 56'; Schwab 62' (pen.); Tsingaras (yellow card) 87'; Vieirinha (yellow card) 90+3'	Stadium: Peristeri Stadium; Attendance: 0 (closed doors); Referee: Aristotelis Diamantopoulos

21 February 2021 23	PAS Giannina	1-0	OFI	Ioannina
17:15	Pamlidis 4', (yellow card) 4'; Erramuspe (yellow card) 41'; Saliakas (yellow card) 51'	Report	Guzmán (yellow card) 14'; Lymperakis (yellow card) 74'; Souza (yellow card) 81'	Stadium: Zosimades Stadium; Attendance: 0 (closed doors); Referee: Stefanos Koubarakis

28 February 2021 24	Lamia	0-0	PAS Giannina	Lamia
17:15	Epassy (yellow card) 30'; Bejarano (yellow card) 42'; Tzanetopoulos (yellow card) 67'	Report	Fabry Castro (yellow card) 51'; Domínguez (yellow card) 72'	Stadium: Lamia Municipal Stadium; Attendance: 0 (closed doors); Referee: Ioannis Papadopoulos

6 March 2021 25	PAS Giannina	1-0	Panathinaikos	Ioannina
19:30	Milinceanu 19'; Fabry Castro (yellow card) 29'; Pantelakis (yellow card) 58'; Lodygin (yellow card) 90'	Report	Villafáñez (yellow card) 59'; Poungouras (yellow card) 71'; Ngbakoto (yellow card) 79'	Stadium: Zosimades Stadium; Attendance: 0 (closed doors); Referee: Aristotelis Diamantopoulos

14 March 2021 26	Asteras Tripolis	0-1	PAS Giannina	Tripoli
19:00	Bellocq (yellow card) 87'	Report	Erramuspe (yellow card) 40'; Brener 85'	Stadium: Theodoros Kolokotronis; Attendance: 0 (closed doors); Referee: Anastasios Papapetrou

=== Play out round ===
Pos	Team	Pld	W	D	L	GF	GA	GD	Pts	VOL	ATR	PAS	LAM	APS	OFI	PNE	AEL
7	Volos	33	10	13	10	34	37	−3	43	—	—	1–1	—	—	0–0	3–1	3–1
8	Atromitos	33	8	13	12	30	40	−10	37	1–0	—	—	0–0	1–1	—	—	0–1
9	PAS Giannina	33	9	8	16	27	36	−9	35	—	1–0	—	1–2	0–2	—	0–1	—
10	Lamia	33	8	11	14	21	42	−21	35	1–1	—	—	—	—	0–2	—	0–0
11	Apollon Smyrnis	33	9	7	17	29	40	−11	34	0–0	—	—	0–1	—	0–0	—	0–2

Source: Super League Greece
Rules for classification: 1) Points; 2) Head-to-head points (Regular season and play-out); 3) Head-to-head goal difference (Regular season and play-out); 4) Regular season position.

==== Results summary ====
Overall								Home						Away					
Pld	W	D	L	GF	GA	GD	Pts	W	D	L	GF	GA	GD	W	D	L	GF	GA	GD
33	9	8	16	27	36	−9	35	4	4	9	11	18	−7	5	4	7	16	18	−2

=== Fixtures ===
Win Draw Loss Upcoming fixture

20 March 2021 1	PAS Giannina	1-0	Atromitos	Ioannina
19:30	Erramuspe 32'; Saliakas (yellow card) 54'; Kartalis (yellow card) 83'	Report	Charisis (yellow card) 85'; Mavrommatis (yellow card) 90'	Stadium: Zosimades Stadium; Attendance: 0 (closed doors); Referee: Agelos Evangelou

3 April 2021 2	OFI	2–1	PAS Giannina	Heraklion, Crete
17:15	Lymperakis (yellow card) 40'; Sardinero 52'; Vouros (yellow card) 58'; Solís 61' (pen.)	Report	Pamlidis (yellow card) 24', (goal) 45+2'; Naumets (yellow card) 65'; Fabry (yellow card) 90+2'	Stadium: Theodoros Vardinogiannis; Attendance: 0 (closed doors); Referee: Efstathios Gortzilas

12 April 2021 3	PAS Giannina	1–2	Lamia	Ioannina
19:30	Brener 10'; Kartalis (yellow card) 49'	Report	Adejo (yellow card) 42'; Tzanetopoulos 47'; Deletić (yellow card) 56'; Bejarano (yellow card) 79'; Deletić 82'; Epassy (yellow card) 90+2'	Stadium: Zosimades Stadium; Attendance: 0 (closed doors); Referee: Anastasios Papapetrou

17 April 2021 4	Volos	1–1	PAS Giannina	Volos
19:30	Sánchez 4'; Barrientos (yellow card) 61'	Report	Brener (yellow card) 18'; Liasos 29'; Panourgias (yellow card) 38'; Pilios (yellow card) 56'; Pantelakis (yellow card) 78'; Oikonomopoulos (yellow card) 81'	Stadium: Panthessaliko Stadium; Attendance: 0 (closed doors); Referee: Aristomenis Kotsiaftis

24 April 2021 5	PAS Giannina	0–1	Panetolikos	Ioannina
15:00	Eleftheriadis (yellow card) 37'; Pilios (yellow card) 42'; Kargas (yellow card) 76'	Report	Hélder Barbosa 20'	Stadium: Zosimades Stadium; Attendance: 0 (closed doors); Referee: Ioannis Papadopoulos

19 May 2021 6	PAS Giannina	0–2	Apollon Smyrnis	Ioannina
17:15	Peersman (yellow card) 89'	Report	Fernández 31'; Chouchoumis (yellow card) 39'; Dauda 57'; Domingues (yellow card) 59'	Stadium: Zosimades Stadium; Attendance: 0 (closed doors); Referee: Aristidis Vatsios

15 May 2021 7	Larissa	2–0	PAS Giannina	Larissa
19:30	Bertos (yellow card) 8'; Acuña 24'; Colombino 38'; Maksymenko (yellow card) 53'; Acuña (yellow card) 63'	Report	Fabry Castro (yellow card) 8'; Pantelakis (yellow card) 27'; Kargas (yellow card) 73'	Stadium: Alcazar Stadium; Attendance: 0 (closed doors); Referee: Evangelos Manouchos

=== Greek Cup ===
==== Sixth round ====
21 January 2021 1st leg	PAS Giannina	2–2	Atromitos	Ioannina
19:30	Panourgias (yellow card) 21'; Eleftheriadis 34' (pen.); Pantelakis (yellow card) 35'; Léo 68'; Pilios (yellow card) 83'	Report	Stroungis 24'; Goutas 44'	Stadium: Zosimades Stadium; Attendance: 0 (closed doors); Referee: Athanasios Sezos

3 February 2021 2nd leg	Atromitos	2–3 (4–5 agg.)	PAS Giannina	Peristeri
15:00	Kotsopoulos 28', 82'; Kivrakidis (yellow card) 67'	Report	Naumets 3'; Milinceanu 10'; Saliakas 13'; Brener (yellow card) 65'; Peersman (yellow card) 74'	Stadium: Peristeri Stadium; Attendance: 0 (closed doors); Referee: Vasilios Fotias

==== Quarter-finals ====
18 February 2021 1st leg	PAS Giannina	2–1	Panathinaikos	Agrinio
15:00	Pamlidis 21'; Kargas 66'; Liasos (yellow card) 90+3'	Report	Macheda 2'; Chatzitheodoridis (yellow card) 53'	Stadium: Panetolikos Stadium; Attendance: 0 (closed doors); Referee: Athanasios Tzilos
Note: The match took place at Panetolikos Stadium due to the inappropriateness of the Zosimades Stadium.

3 March 2021 2nd leg	Panathinaikos	1–2 (2–4 agg.)	PAS Giannina	Athens
20:30	Poungouras 74'; Ngbakoto (yellow card) 78'	Report	Pantelakis 2'; Chatzitheodoridis 9' (o.g.); Peersman (yellow card) 55'; Saliakas (yellow card) 86'; Domínguez (yellow card) 89'	Stadium: Leoforos Stadium; Attendance: 0 (closed doors); Referee: Kirill Levnikov

==== Semi-finals ====
7 April 2021 1st leg	PAS Giannina	1–1	Olympiacos	Ioannina
18:00	Pantelakis (yellow card) 12'; Erramuspe (yellow card) 13'; Fabry Castro (yellow card) 44'; Peersman (yellow card) 45+2'; Erramuspe 45+6' (pen.)	Report	Reabciuk (yellow card) 21'; Ba (yellow card) 45+5'; Hassan 73'	Stadium: Zosimades Stadium; Attendance: 0 (closed doors); Referee: Andris Treimanis (Latvia)

28 April 2021 2nd leg	Olympiacos	3–1 (4–2 agg.)	PAS Giannina	Piraeus
19:00	El-Arabi 26' (pen.), 41'; Androutsos (yellow card) 43'; Holebas (yellow card) 52' (yellow-red card) 90'; Bruma 56'; Semedo (yellow card) 86'	Report	Peersman (yellow card) 25'; Kartalis 50'; Pantelakis (yellow card) 90+3'	Stadium: Karaiskakis Stadium; Attendance: 0 (closed doors); Referee: Paweł Raczkowski (Poland)

== Statistics ==
=== Appearances ===
No.	Pos.	Nat.	Name	Greek Super League	Greek Cup	Total
No.	Pos.	Nat.	Name	Apps	Apps	Apps
1	GK	(Greece)	Makis Giannikoglou	0	0	0
2	RB	(Greece)	Manolis Saliakas	31	5	36
4	CB	(Greece)	Epaminondas Pantelakis	31	5	36
5	CB	(Greece)	Giorgos Gogos	0	0	0
6	CB	(Greece)	Giannis Kargas	23	6	29
7	MF	(Greece)	Alexandros Kartalis	29	6	35
8	MF	(Argentina)	Fabricio Brener	22	4	26
9	CM / RLW	(Greece)	Christos Eleftheriadis	29	6	35
10	MF	(Spain)	Juan Dominguez	26	4	30
11	FW	(Greece)	Giorgos Doumtsis	6	1	7
12	FW	(Croatia)	Sandi Križman	21	2	23
13	GK	(Russia) (Greece)	Yuri Lodygin	13	4	17
14	FW	(Greece)	Georgios Pamlidis	33	5	38
15	CB	(Argentina)	Rodrigo Erramuspe	25	4	29
17	MF	(Ukraine)	Vladyslav Naumets	17	4	21
19	MF	(Greece)	Alexandros Lolis	10	3	13
20	FW	(Moldova)	Nicolae Milinceanu	10	6	16
21	MF	(Colombia)	Fabry Castro	23	5	28
22	CM	(Greece)	Stefanos Siontis	17	0	17
23	FW	(Greece)	Stavros Pilios	7	1	8
24	RB	(Greece)	Antonis Oikonomopoulos	12	1	13
25	CB	(Greece)	Pantelis Panourgias	5	3	8
28	MF	(Greece)	Giorgos Xydas	0	0	0
29	FW	(France)	Jean-Baptiste Léo	20	2	22
30	MF	(Greece)	Alexis Triadis	2	0	2
33	GK	(Greece)	Lefteris Choutesiotis	20	1	21
43	LB	(Belgium)	Marvin Peersman	30	5	35
47	MF	(Greece)	Pavlos Grosdanis	4	1	5
80	CM	(Greece)	Angelos Liasos	23	5	28
92	FW	(Belarus)	Maxim Natynchik	0	0	0
99	GK	(Greece)	Vasilis Athanasiou	2	1	3

Super League Greece

=== Goalscorers ===
No.	Pos.	Nat.	Name	Greek Super League	Greek Cup	Total
No.	Pos.	Nat.	Name	Goals	Goals	Goals
14	FW	(Greece)	Georgios Pamlidis	7	1	8
9	CM / RLW	(Greece)	Christos Eleftheriadis	4	1	5
6	CB	(Greece)	Giannis Kargas	2	1	3
12	FW	(Croatia)	Sandi Križman	3	0	3
15	CB	(Argentina)	Rodrigo Erramuspe	2	1	3
29	FW	(France)	Jean-Baptiste Léo	2	1	3
8	MF	(Argentina)	Fabricio Brener	2	0	2
17	MF	(Ukraine)	Vladyslav Naumets	1	1	2
20	FW	(Moldova)	Nicolae Milinceanu	1	1	2
4	CB	(Greece)	Epaminondas Pantelakis	1	1	2
2	RB	(Greece)	Manolis Saliakas	0	1	1
7	MF	(Greece)	Alexandros Kartalis	0	1	1
80	CM	(Greece)	Angelos Liasos	1	0	1
			Own goals	1	1	2

=== Clean sheets ===
No.	Pos.	Nat.	Name	Greek Super 2 League	Greek Cup	Total
No.	Pos.	Nat.	Name	CS	CS	CS
1	GK	(Greece)	Makis Giannikoglou	0 (0)	0 (0)	0 (0)
13	GK	(Greece)	Yuri Lodygin	6 (13)	0 (4)	6 (17)
33	GK	(Greece)	Lefteris Choutesiotis	6 (20)	0 (1)	6 (21)
99	GK	(Greece)	Vasilis Athanasiou	1 (2)	0 (1)	1 (3)

=== Disciplinary record ===
S	P	N	Name	Super League			Play out			Greek Cup			Total		
S	P	N	Name	Yellow card	Yellow-red card	Red card	Yellow card	Yellow-red card	Red card	Yellow card	Yellow-red card	Red card	Yellow card	Yellow-red card	Red card
2	RB	(Greece)	Manolis Saliakas	6	0	0	1	0	0	1	0	0	8	0	0
4	CB	(Greece)	Epaminondas Pantelakis	6	0	0	2	0	0	3	0	0	11	0	0
6	CB	(Greece)	Giannis Kargas	8	0	0	2	0	0	0	0	0	10	0	0
7	MF	(Greece)	Alexandros Kartalis	6	0	0	2	0	0	0	0	0	8	0	0
8	MF	(Argentina)	Fabricio Brener	0	0	0	1	0	0	1	0	0	2	0	0
9	CM / RLW	(Greece)	Christos Eleftheriadis	2	0	0	1	0	0	0	0	0	3	0	0
10	MF	(Spain)	Juan Dominguez	3	0	0	0	0	0	1	0	0	4	0	0
12	FW	(Croatia)	Sandi Križman	4	0	0	0	0	0	0	0	0	4	0	0
13	GK	(Russia) (Greece)	Yuri Lodygin	2	0	0	0	0	0	0	0	0	2	0	0
14	FW	(Greece)	Georgios Pamlidis	2	0	0	1	0	0	0	0	0	3	0	0
15	CB	(Argentina)	Rodrigo Erramuspe	6	1	0	0	0	0	1	0	0	7	1	0
17	MF	(Ukraine)	Vladyslav Naumets	1	0	0	1	0	0	0	0	0	2	0	0
19	MF	(Greece)	Alexandros Lolis	0	1	0	0	0	0	0	0	0	0	1	0
21	MF	(Colombia)	Fabry Castro	4	0	0	2	0	0	1	0	0	7	0	0
22	CM	(Greece)	Stefanos Siontis	3	0	1	0	0	0	0	0	0	3	0	1
23	FW	(Greece)	Stavros Pilios	0	0	0	2	0	0	1	0	0	3	0	0
24	RB	(Greece)	Antonis Oikonomopoulos	5	0	0	1	0	0	0	0	0	6	0	0
25	CB	(Greece)	Pantelis Panourgias	0	0	0	1	0	0	1	0	0	2	0	0
29	FW	(France)	Jean-Baptiste Léo	1	0	0	0	0	0	0	0	0	1	0	0
33	GK	(Greece)	Lefteris Choutesiotis	4	0	0	0	0	0	0	0	0	4	0	0
43	LB	(Belgium)	Marvin Peersman	5	0	0	1	0	0	4	0	0	10	0	0
80	CM	(Greece)	Angelos Liasos	2	0	0	0	0	0	1	0	0	3	0	0
99	GK	(Greece)	Vasilis Athanasiou	1	0	0	0	0	0	0	0	0	1	0	0
