= 2019–20 PAS Giannina F.C. season =

Greek football club season

PAS Giannina
2019–20 season
- Chairman: Giorgos Christovasilis
- Manager: Argirios Giannikis
- Stadium: Zosimades Stadium, Ioannina
- Super League 2: 1st (promoted)
- Greek Cup: Round of 16 eliminated by Panathinaikos
- Top goalscorer: League: Sandi Križman; Jean-Baptiste Léo (10 each); All: Georgios Pamlidis (12)
Home colours	Away colours

The 2019–20 season is PAS Giannina F.C.'s 27th competitive season in the second division of Greek football, 1st season in the Super League Greece 2, and 54th year in existence as a football club. They also compete in the Greek Cup.

PAS Giannina was first when the championship was suspended. On 22 June 2020 it was announced that the ranking on 12 March 2020 is the final ranking. PAS Giannina was promoted to Super League Greece.

== Players ==
updated 20/1/20

No.	Name	Nationality	Position(s)	Place of birth	Date of birth	Signed from	Notes
Goalkeepers
1	Makis Giannikoglou	(Greece)	GK	Kavala, Greece	25 March 1993	(Greece) AEK Athens	
12	Kostas Peristeridis	(Greece)	GK	Chania, Crete, Greece	24 January 1991	(Greece) Platanias	
33	Lefteris Choutesiotis	(Greece)	GK	Makrychori, Greece	20 July 1994	(Greece) Olympiacos	
Defenders
2	Michalis Boukouvalas (VC)	(Greece)	RB	Agrinio, Greece	14 January 1988	(Greece) Iraklis	
4	Epaminondas Pantelakis	(Greece)	CB	Chania, Crete, Greece	10 February 1995	(Greece) Panathinaikos	
5	Giorgos Gogos	(Greece)	CB	Ioannina, Greece	11 July 2001	(Greece) PAS Giannina U20	
20	Angelos Zioulis	(Greece)	CB	Athens, Greece	1 February 1995	(Greece) Kissamikos	
24	Antonis Oikonomopoulos	(Greece)	RB	Athens, Greece	9 May 1998	(Greece) Apollon Smyrnis	
25	Pantelis Panourgias	(Greece)	CB	Athens, Greece	13 April 1998	(Netherlands) PEC Zwolle	
27	Lasha Shergelashvili	(Georgia (country))	LB	Tbilisi, Georgia	17 January 1992	(Latvia) RFS	
44	Apostolos Skondras (C)	(Greece)	CB	Athens, Greece	29 December 1988	(Greece) AEL	
77	Alexis Apostolopoulos	(Greece)	RB	Zakynthos, Greece	7 November 1991	(Greece) Platanias	
Midfielders
7	Alexandros Kartalis	(Greece)	MF	Nuremberg, Germany	29 January 1995	(Germany) FSV Zwickau	
9	Christos Eleftheriadis	(Greece)	CM / RLW	Aridaia, Greece	30 September 1991	(Greece) Panachaiki	
17	Vladyslav Naumets	(Ukraine)	MF	Luhansk, Ukraine	7 March 1999	Free	
19	Alexandros Lolis	(Greece)	MF	Ladochori Thesprotias, Greece	5 September 2002	(Greece) PAS Giannina U-17	
21	Fabry Castro	(Colombia)	MF	Santa Bárbara, Colombia	21 February 1992	(Switzerland) Servette FC	
22	Stefanos Siontis	(Greece)	CM	Ioannina, Greece	4 September 1987	(Greece) Kassiopi	
28	Giorgos Xydas	(Greece)	MF	Chios, Greece	14 April 1997	(Greece) Kissamikos	
47	Pavlos Grosdanis	(Greece)	MF	Florina, Greece	3 April 2002	(Greece) PAS Giannina U-17	
80	Angelos Liasos	(Greece)	CM	Florina, Greece	26 May 2000	(Greece) PAS Giannina U-20	
88	Alexandros Nikolias (VC2)	(Greece)	CM / RLW	Kymi, Euboea, Greece	23 July 1994	(Greece) Olympiacos Volos	
Forwards
10	Sandi Križman	(Croatia)	FW	Pula, SR Croatia, SFR Yugoslavia	17 August 1989	(Greece) AEL	
14	Georgios Pamlidis	(Greece)	FW	Katerini, Greece	13 November 1993	(Greece) Kassiopi	
23	Stavros Pilios	(Greece)	FW	Ioannina, Greece	10 December 2000	(Greece) PAS Giannina U-19	
29	Jean-Baptiste Léo	(France)	FW	Lyon, France	3 May 1996	(Greece) Kissamikos	
Left during Winter Transfer Window
13	Samir Radovac	(Bosnia and Herzegovina)	MF	Sarajevo, Bosnia and Herzegovina	25 January 1996	(Bosnia and Herzegovina) FK Olimpik	
26	Miguel Sebastián Garcia	(Argentina)	MF	Santa Fe, Argentina	27 January 1984	(Greece) Volos	
15	Vasilis Zogos	(Greece)	CB	Athens, Greece	29 July 1999	(Italy) Alessandria	
16	Thodoris Venetikidis	(Greece)	GK	Veria, Greece	20 February 2001	(Greece) Veria	

=== International players ===
- (Greece) Michalis Boukouvalas
- (Greece) Kostas Peristeridis (Men's & U-19)
- (Georgia (country)) Lasha Shergelashvili
- (Greece) Alexis Apostolopoulos (U-21 & U-19)
- (Greece) Serafeim Giannikoglou (U-17)
- (Croatia) Sandi Križman (U-21/20/19/18)
- (Greece) Stefanos Siontis (U-19)
- (Greece) Giorgos Xydas (U-19)
- (Ukraine) Vladyslav Naumets (U-19/18/17)
- (Greece) Giorgos Gogos (U-17)
- (Bosnia and Herzegovina) Samir Radovac (U-21/19/18/17)
- (Greece) Antonis Oikonomopoulos (U-17)
- (Greece) Pantelis Panourgias (U-19)
- (Greece) Pavlos Grosdanis (U-17)
- (Greece) Epaminondas Pantelakis (U-19)
- (Greece) Lefteris Choutesiotis (U-21)

=== Foreign players ===
EU Nationals
- (Croatia) (Europe) Sandi Križman

EU Nationals (Dual Citizenship)

Non-EU Nationals
- (Colombia) Fabry Castro
- (Ukraine) Vladyslav Naumets
- (Georgia (country)) Lasha Shergelashvili
- (Bosnia and Herzegovina) Samir Radovac
- (Argentina) Miguel Sebastián Garcia

== Personnel ==
=== Management ===
Position	Staff
Majority Owner	Giorgos Christovasilis
President and CEO	Giorgos Christovasilis
Director of Football	Dimitris Niarchakos (until 23/9/19) Giorgos Ntasios
Director of Office	Alekos Potsis
Head of Ticket Department	Andreas Potsis

=== Coaching staff ===
Position	Name
Head Coach	Argirios Giannikis
Assistant Coach	Nikos Badimas
Fitness Coach	Ioannis Dourountos
Goalkeepers Coach	Spiros Christopoulos

=== medical staff ===
Position	Name
Head doctor	Stavros Restanis
Physio	Filippos Skordos

=== Academy ===
Position	Name
Head of Youth Development	
Head Coach U-19	Nikos Badimas
Head Coach U-17	Marios Panagiotou (until 10 August 2019) Christos Agelis (from 14 August 2019)
Head Coach U-15	Michalis Bolos

== Transfers ==
=== Summer ===
==== In ====
No	Pos	Player	Transferred from	Fee	Date	Source
1	GK	Makis Giannikoglou	AEK Athens	-	13 June 2019	
-	MF	Orest Kuzyk	SC Dnipro-1	Loan return	1 July 2019	
15	CB	Vasilis Zogos	Alessandria	Loan return	1 July 2019	
7	MF	Alexandros Kartalis	FSV Zwickau	-	5 July 2019	
20	CB	Angelos Zioulis	Kissamikos	-	12 July 2019	
13	MF	Samir Radovac	FK Olimpik	-	16 July 2019	
9	MF	Christos Eleftheriadis	Panachaiki	-	16 July 2019	
26	MF	Miguel Sebastián Garcia	Volos	-	5 August 2019	
24	RB	Antonis Oikonomopoulos	Apollon Smyrnis	-	20 August 2019	
25	CB	Pantelis Panourgias	PEC Zwolle	-	20 August 2019	
-	CB	Spyros Vasilakis	PAS Giannina U-19	-	20 August 2019	
47	MF	Pavlos Grosdanis	PAS Giannina U-17	-	23 August 2019	
19	MF	Alexandros Lolis	PAS Giannina U-17	-	23 August 2019	
4	CB	Epaminondas Pantelakis	Panathinaikos	-	31 August 2019	
33	GK	Lefteris Choutesiotis	Olympiakos	-	9 September 2019	

==== Out ====
No	Pos	Player	Transferred to	Fee	Date	Source
7	CM	Evripidis Giakos	AEL	-	13 May 2019	
55	CM	Enes Dolovac	FK Dinamo Vranje	-	14 May 2019	
33	CM	Higor Vidal	Žalgiris	-	21 May 2019	
6	CB	Alexios Michail	AEL	-	6 June 2019	
93	GK	Neofytos Michael	APOEL	Loan termination	13 June 2019	
19	CB	Giannis Kargas	PFC Levski Sofia	-	18 June 2019	
8	CB	Themistoklis Tzimopoulos	Korona Kielce	-	21 June 2019	
4	CB	Stefanos Evangelou	Olympiacos	Loan termination	25 June 2019	
9	FW	Stefanos Athanasiadis	-	-	26 June 2019	
27	FW	Dimitrios Manos	Olympiacos	End of loan	1 July 2019	
39	GK	Markos Vellidis	PAS Lamia	-	1 July 2019	
30	GK	Giorgos Papaioannou	Anagennisi Artas	-	1 July 2019	
3	DM	Andi Lila	Tirana	-	1 July 2019	
-	MF	Orest Kuzyk	FC Desna Chernihiv	Loan	14 July 2019	
-	CB	Spyros Vasilakis	Souli Paramythia	Loan	20 August 2019	
20	MF	Konstantinos Papadopoulos	-	-	21 August 2019	
35	MF	Dušan Pantelić	FK Radnički Niš	-	31 August 2019	

For recent transfers, see List of Greek football transfers summer 2019.

=== Winter ===
==== Out ====
No	Pos	Player	Transferred to	Fee	Date	Source
13	CM	Samir Radovac	FK Velež Mostar	-	5 January 2020	
26	MF	Miguel Sebastián Garcia	Retired	-	20 January 2020	
15	CB	Vasilis Zogos	KF Bylis		25 January 2020	
16	GK	Thodoris Venetikidis			29 January 2020	

For recent transfers, see List of Greek football transfers winter 2019–20.

== Alternative ==
for friendlies

== Pre-season and friendlies ==
Win Draw Loss Upcoming fixture

7 August 2019 Friendly	PAS Giannina	0–1	AEL	Ioannina
18:30		Report	Živković 56'	Stadium: Zosimades Stadium; Attendance: unknown Referee: Konstantinos Tsetsilas

11 August 2019 Friendly	PAS Giannina	2–0	Panetolikos	Ioannina
18:30	Križman 45'; Pamlidis 82'	Report		Stadium: Zosimades Stadium; Attendance: unknown Referee: Charalabos Athanasiou

24 August 2019 Friendly	PAS Giannina	1–1	Veria	Ioannina
18:30	Liasos 84'	Report	Kanoulas 70'	Stadium: Zosimades Stadium; Attendance: unknown Referee: Spiros Zampalas

1 September 2019 Friendly	PAS Giannina	2–1	Karaiskakis	Ioannina
18:30	Léo 52', 64'	Report	Kushta 43'	Stadium: Zosimades Stadium; Attendance: unknown Referee: Giannis Panos

7 September 2019 Friendly	PAS Giannina	3–1	Thesprotos	Ioannina
17:30	Siontis 22'; Pamlidis 25', 44'	Report	Christian Ramirez 61'	Stadium: Zosimades Stadium; Attendance: unknown Referee: Konstantinos Neos

13 September 2019 Friendly	PAS Giannina	3–0	Olympiacos Volos	Ioannina
17:30	Pamlidis 67'; Léo 79'; Pitu Garcia 90+2'	Report		Stadium: Zosimades Stadium; Attendance: unknown Referee: Konstantinos Boubas

15 September 2019 Friendly	PAS Giannina	2–0	Kassiopi	Ioannina
17:30	Pavlos Grosdanis 26', 54'	Report		Stadium: Zosimades Stadium; Attendance: unknown Referee: Spiros Zampalas

20 September 2019 Friendly	PAS Giannina	4–1	Apollon Larissa	Ioannina
17:30	Léo 48'; Oikonomopoulos 55'; Alexandros Lolis 65'; Naumets 81'	Report	Sifneos 83' (pen.)	Stadium: PEAKI; Attendance: unknown Referee: Konstantinos Neos

12 October 2019 Friendly	PAS Giannina	1–1	Kassiopi	Ioannina
17:00	Oikonomopoulos 74'	Report	Vasiloudis 68'	Stadium: PEAKI; Attendance: unknown Referee: Alexandros Tzovas

13 October 2019 Friendly	PAS Giannina	2–0	Panachaiki	Ioannina
15:00	Pamlidis 36'; Križman 75'	Report		Stadium: PEAKI; Attendance: unknown Referee: Dimitris Chatzipanagiotou

18 October 2019 Friendly	PAS Giannina	2–1	Karaiskakis	Ioannina
16:00	Naumets 33'; Kartalis 54'	Report	Marios Kapsalis 73'	Stadium: PEAKI; Attendance: unknown Referee: Konstantinos Neos

== Competitions ==
=== League table ===
Pos	Team	Pld	W	D	L	GF	GA	GD	Pts	Promotion or relegation
1	PAS Giannina (C, P)	20	15	4	1	44	11	+33	49	Promotion to Super League
2	Apollon Smyrnis (P)	20	13	3	4	36	13	+23	42	Qualification for the Promotion play-offs
3	Chania	20	11	5	4	33	9	+24	38	
4	Levadiakos	20	11	5	4	27	15	+12	38	
5	Karaiskakis	20	9	4	7	32	29	+3	31	

Source: sl2fl.gr
Rules for classification: 1) Points; 2) Head-to-head points; 3) Head-to-head goal difference; 4) Goals scored; 5) Goals against; 6) Play-offs (neutral ground, only used if needed to decide teams for promotion or relegation).
(C) Champions; (P) Promoted

==== Results summary ====
Overall								Home						Away					
Pld	W	D	L	GF	GA	GD	Pts	W	D	L	GF	GA	GD	W	D	L	GF	GA	GD
20	15	4	1	44	11	+33	49	7	2	1	21	6	+15	8	2	0	23	5	+18

=== Fixtures ===
Win Draw Loss Upcoming fixture

29 September 2019 1	Panachaiki	1-1	PAS Giannina	Agyia, Patras
16:00	Papatolios 26'	Report	Apostolopoulos 38'	Stadium: Kostas Davourlis Stadium; Referee: Vagelis Gratsanis

25 October 2019 2	Levadiakos	1-2	PAS Giannina	Livadeia
19:30	Mantzios 44' (pen.)	Report	Panteliadis 9' (o.g.); Pamlidis 47' (pen.)	Stadium: Levadia Municipal Stadium; Referee: Agelos Agelakis

4 November 2019 3	PAS Giannina	2-2	Ergotelis	Ioannina
17:00	Pamlidis 54' (pen.), 73'	Report	Efford 18'; Rovithis 58'	Stadium: Zosimades Stadium; Referee: Panagiotis Koukoulas

8 November 2019 4	Chania	0-1	PAS Giannina	Chania
17:00		Report	Kartalis 59'	Stadium: Perivolia Municipal Stadium; Referee: Andreas Gamaris

18 November 2019 5	PAS Giannina	3-0	Apollon Pontus	Ioannina
17:00	Pamlidis 78'; Križman 80'; Léo 85'	Report		Stadium: Zosimades Stadium; Referee: Konstantinos Poulikidis

24 November 2019 6	Apollon Smyrnis	0-0	PAS Giannina	Athens
15:00		Report		Stadium: Georgios Kamaras Stadium; Referee: Konstantinos Perrakis

1 December 2019 7	PAS Giannina	2-0	Platanias	Ioannina
19:30	Fabry 64'; Pamlidis 76'	Report		Stadium: Zosimades Stadium; Referee: Alexandros Tsakalidis

8 December 2019 8	PAS Giannina	1-0	Doxa Drama	Ioannina
17:30	Križman 25'	Report		Stadium: Zosimades Stadium; Referee: Nikolaos Bailis

13 December 2019 9	Kassiopi	0-4	PAS Giannina	Corfu (city)
17:00		Report	Naumets 3', 30', 92'; Xydas 9'	Stadium: Kerkyra Stadium; Referee: Panagiotis Tsopoulidis

22 December 2019 10	PAS Giannina	2–0	Karaiskakis	Ioannina
15:00	Pantelakis 23'; Križman 24'	Report		Stadium: Zosimades Stadium; Referee: Meletis Gioumatzidis

5 January 2020 11	Apollon Larissa	0-3	PAS Giannina	Larissa
14:45		Report	Fabry 31'; Križman 37'; Léo 81'	Stadium: Apollon Ground; Referee: Fotis Ntaoulas

12 January 2020 12	PAS Giannina	1–0	Panachaiki	Ioannina
15:15	Léo 42'	Report		Stadium: Zosimades Stadium; Referee: Meletis Gioumatzidis

20 January 2020 13	PAS Giannina	0–1	Levadiakos	Ioannina
16:30		Report	Mejía 92'	Stadium: Zosimades Stadium; Referee: Christos Vergetis

26 January 2020 14	Ergotelis	1-2	PAS Giannina	Heraklion
17:00	Efford 90+1'	Report	Léo 39', 51'	Stadium: Pankritio Stadium; Referee: Angelos Aggelakis

2 February 2020 15	PAS Giannina	1–1	Chania	Ioannina
14:45	Léo 16'	Report	Nikos Vrettos 90+4'	Stadium: Zosimades Stadium; Referee: Spyridon Kolytas

9 February 2020 16	Apollon Pontus	1-6	PAS Giannina	Triglia
15:00	Filoxenos Toursidis 27'	Report	Léo 52', 54'; Križman 59', 79', 89'; Eleftheriadis 65'	Stadium: Triglia Municipal Stadium; Referee: Georgios Meltzanidis

16 February 2020 17	PAS Giannina	5–1	Apollon Smyrnis	Ioannina
17:00	Pantelakis 10'; Skondras 33'; Pamlidis 41'; Križman 62'; Léo 81'	Report	Fatjon 51' (pen.)	Stadium: Zosimades Stadium; Referee: Alexandros Tsakalidis

24 February 2020 18	Platanias	0-2	PAS Giannina	Platanias
16:00		Report	Pantelakis 19'; Kartalis 56'	Stadium: Perivolia Municipal Stadium; Referee: Michalis Matsoukas

28 February 2020 19	Doxa Drama	1-2	PAS Giannina	Drama
16:00	Kritikos 63'	Report	Križman 21'; Léo 90+4'	Stadium: Doxa Drama Stadium; Referee: Andreas Vlachos

8 March 2020 20	PAS Giannina	4–1	Kassiopi	Ioannina
15:00	Pamlidis 19' (pen.) 74' (pen.); Eleftheriadis 38'; Križman 42'	Report	Youri de Winter 40'	Stadium: Zosimades Stadium; Referee: Marios Oraiopoulos

21	Karaiskakis	v	PAS Giannina	Arta
				Stadium: Agioi Anargiroi Municipal Stadium

22	PAS Giannina	v	Apollon Larissa	Ioannina
				Stadium: Zosimades Stadium

Match not held due to the COVID-19 pandemic.

=== Greek Cup ===
PAS Giannina will enter the Greek Cup at the fourth round.

==== Fourth round ====
2 October 2019 1	Aspropyrgos	0-2	PAS Giannina	Aspropyrgos, Athens
16:00		Report	Naumets 18'; Pamlidis 37'	Stadium: Aspropyrgos Municipal Stadium; Referee: Konstantinos Andrianos

==== Fifth round ====
29 October 2019 1st leg	PAS Giannina	1–0	Veria	Ioannina
19:30	Pamlidis 47'	Report		Stadium: Zosimades Stadium; Attendance: unknown Referee: Meletios Gioumatzidis

4 December 2019 2st leg	Veria	1–2	PAS Giannina	Veria
19:30	Melikiotis 41'	Report	Pamlidis 37'; Pilios 94' (pen.)	Stadium: Veria Stadium; Attendance: unknown Referee: Meletios Gioumatzidis

==== Round of 16 ====
8 January 2020 1st leg	PAS Giannina	1–0	Panathinaikos	Ioannina
17:15	Pamlidis 28'	Report		Stadium: Zosimades Stadium; Attendance: unknown Referee: Fotios Fotiadis

15 January 2020 2st leg	Panathinaikos	3–1	PAS Giannina	Athens
17:15	Donis 56'; Schenkeveld 58'; Macheda	Report	Pantelakis 24'	Stadium: Olympic Stadium; Attendance: unknown Referee: Ioannis Papadopoulos

== Statistics ==
=== Appearances ===
No.	Pos.	Nat.	Name	Greek Super League 2	Greek Cup	Total
No.	Pos.	Nat.	Name	Apps	Apps	Apps
1	GK	(Greece)	Makis Giannikoglou	2	3	5
2	RB	(Greece)	Michalis Boukouvalas	19	4	23
4	CB	(Greece)	Epaminondas Pantelakis	18	4	22
5	CB	(Greece)	Giorgos Gogos	1	0	1
7	MF	(Greece)	Alexandros Kartalis	12	4	16
9	CM / RLW	(Greece)	Christos Eleftheriadis	6	0	6
10	FW	(Croatia)	Sandi Križman	17	2	19
12	GK	(Greece)	Kostas Peristeridis	1	0	1
13	MF	(Bosnia and Herzegovina)	Samir Radovac	2	2	4
14	FW	(Greece)	Georgios Pamlidis	19	5	24
15	CB	(Greece)	Vasilis Zogos	0	0	0
16	GK	(Greece)	Thodoris Venetikidis	0	0	0
17	MF	(Ukraine)	Vladyslav Naumets	12	4	16
19	MF	(Greece)	Alexandros Lolis	5	1	6
20	CB	(Greece)	Angelos Zioulis	4	3	7
21	MF	(Colombia)	Fabry Castro	14	4	18
22	CM	(Greece)	Stefanos Siontis	18	3	21
23	FW	(Greece)	Stavros Pilios	2	2	4
24	RB	(Greece)	Antonis Oikonomopoulos	4	3	7
25	CB	(Greece)	Pantelis Panourgias	0	0	0
26	MF	(Argentina)	Miguel Sebastián Garcia	7	2	9
27	LB	(Georgia (country))	Lasha Shergelashvili	1	0	1
28	MF	(Greece)	Giorgos Xydas	16	4	20
29	FW	(France)	Jean-Baptiste Léo	20	5	25
33	GK	(Greece)	Lefteris Choutesiotis	17	2	19
44	CB	(Greece)	Apostolos Skondras	19	3	22
47	MF	(Greece)	Pavlos Grosdanis	0	1	1
77	RB	(Greece)	Alexis Apostolopoulos	18	2	20
80	CM	(Greece)	Angelos Liasos	14	5	19
88	CM / RLW	(Greece)	Alexandros Nikolias	12	2	14

=== Goalscorers ===
No.	Pos.	Nat.	Name	Greek Super 2 League	Greek Cup	Total
No.	Pos.	Nat.	Name	Goals	Goals	Goals
14	FW	(Greece)	Georgios Pamlidis	8	4	12
10	FW	(Croatia)	Sandi Križman	10	0	10
29	FW	(France)	Jean-Baptiste Léo	10	0	10
17	MF	(Ukraine)	Vladyslav Naumets	3	1	4
4	CB	(Greece)	Epaminondas Pantelakis	3	1	4
21	MF	(Colombia)	Fabry Castro	2	0	2
7	MF	(Greece)	Alexandros Kartalis	2	0	2
9	CM / RLW	(Greece)	Christos Eleftheriadis	2	0	2
23	FW	(Greece)	Stavros Pilios	0	1	1
28	MF	(Greece)	Giorgos Xydas	1	0	1
44	CB	(Greece)	Apostolos Skondras	1	0	1
77	RB	(Greece)	Alexis Apostolopoulos	1	0	1
			Own goals	1	0	1

=== Clean sheets ===
No.	Pos.	Nat.	Name	Greek Super 2 League	Greek Cup	Total
No.	Pos.	Nat.	Name	CS	CS	CS
1	GK	(Greece)	Makis Giannikoglou	0 (2)	1 (3)	1 (5)
12	GK	(Greece)	Kostas Peristeridis	0 (1)	0 (0)	0 (1)
16	GK	(Greece)	Thodoris Venetikidis	0 (0)	0 (0)	0 (0)
33	GK	(Greece)	Lefteris Choutesiotis	10 (17)	2 (2)	12 (19)
