= List of Greek football transfers summer 2019 =

This is a list of Greek football transfers for the 2019 summer transfer window by club. Only transfers of clubs in the Super League 1 and Super League 2 are included.

Previous window: winter 2018–19. Next window: winter 2019–20.

== Super League 1 ==
Note: Flags indicate national team as has been defined under FIFA eligibility rules. Players may hold more than one non-FIFA nationality.

=== AEK Athens ===
In:

| No. | Pos. | Nation | Player |
|---|---|---|---|
| 7 | FW | ITA | Daniele Verde (from (Italy) Roma, previously on loan at (Spain) Real Valladolid) |
| 11 | FW | SRB | Miloš Deletić (from AEL) |
| 12 | MF | POR | Francisco Geraldes (on loan from (Portugal) Sporting CP) |
| 18 | FW | POR | Nélson Oliveira (from (England) Norwich City, previously on loan at (England) Reading) |
| 21 | DF | BIH | Ognjen Vranješ (on loan from (Belgium) Anderlecht) |
| 22 | MF | POR | David Simão (from (Belgium) Antwerp) |
| 27 | DF | POR | Paulinho (from (Portugal) Chaves) |
| 30 | GK | GRE | Georgios Athanasiadis (from Asteras Tripolis) |

Out:

| No. | Pos. | Nation | Player |
|---|---|---|---|
| 5 | DF | GRE | Vasilios Lampropoulos (to (Spain) Deportivo La Coruña) |
| 11 | FW | GRE | Giannis Gianniotas (to (Cyprus) Apollon Limassol) |
| 12 | DF | BRA | Rodrigo Galo (released) |
| 14 | FW | GRE | Tasos Bakasetas (to (Turkey) Alanyaspor) |
| 15 | DF | SRB | Uroš Ćosić (to (Romania) Universitatea Craiova) |
| 22 | FW | ARG | Ezequiel Ponce (loan return to (Italy) Roma) |
| 31 | FW | ARG | Lucas Boyé (loan return to (Italy) Torino) |
| 33 | DF | GRE | Giorgos Giannoutsos (on loan to (Cyprus) Alki Oroklini) |
| 40 | GK | GRE | Makis Giannikoglou (to PAS Giannina) |
| 95 | MF | BRA | Alef (loan return to (Portugal) Braga) |

=== AEL ===
In:

| No. | Pos. | Nation | Player |
|---|---|---|---|
| 7 | DF | GRE | Alexios Michail (from PAS Giannina) |
| 9 | FW | NGR | Abiola Dauda (from (Turkey) Giresunspor) |
| 12 | MF | SRB | Miloš Filipović (from (Bosnia and Herzegovina) Zrinjski Mostar) |
| 19 | MF | GRE | Evripidis Giakos (from PAS Giannina) |
| 88 | DF | SRB | Nikola Stanković (from (Serbia) Radnički Niš) |
| 99 | GK | SRB | Borivoje Ristić (from (Serbia) Radnički Niš) |
| — | MF | GRE | Bruno Chalkiadakis (free agent) |
| — | MF | ARG | Jonathan Bustos (from (Argentina) Platense) |
| — | MF | EGY | Amr Warda (on loan from PAOK) |
| — | MF | ALB | Ergys Kaçe (on loan from PAOK) |
| — | MF | CIV | Jean Luc Gbayara Assoubre (from (Cyprus) AEK Larnaca) |

Out:

| No. | Pos. | Nation | Player |
|---|---|---|---|
| — | MF | GRE | Vangelis Nousios (to Apollon Larissa) |
| 2 | DF | GRE | Theodoros Tripotseris (released) |
| 7 | MF | GRE | Kenan Bargan (released) |
| 9 | FW | BIH | Petar Kunić (to (Bosnia and Herzegovina) Zrinjski Mostar) |
| 11 | FW | SRB | Miloš Deletić (to AEK Athens) |
| 12 | GK | GRE | Panagiotis Paiteris (to (Albania) Luftëtari Gjirokastër) |
| 13 | DF | MKD | Nikola Jakimovski (to (Italy) Trapani) |
| 19 | MF | BRA | Leozinho (to Kissamikos) |
| 21 | MF | ESP | Noé Acosta (to (India) Jamshedpur) |
| 23 | DF | BUL | Hristofor Hubchev (to (Bulgaria) Etar) |
| 35 | MF | GRE | Lefteris Bamis (to Niki Volos) |
| 55 | DF | GRE | Christos Gromitsaris (to Kissamikos) |
| 95 | GK | MKD | Davor Taleski (to (Albania) Bylis Ballsh) |

=== Aris ===
In:

| No. | Pos. | Nation | Player |

Out:

| No. | Pos. | Nation | Player |

=== Asteras Tripolis ===
In:

| No. | Pos. | Nation | Player |

Out:

| No. | Pos. | Nation | Player |
|---|---|---|---|
| 30 | GK | GRE | Georgios Athanasiadis (to AEK Athens) |

=== Atromitos ===
In:

| No. | Pos. | Nation | Player |
|---|---|---|---|
| 4 | DF | GRE | Dimitrios Goutas (from (Greece) Olympiacos) |
| 5 | DF | ISR | Tal Kachila (from (Israel) Beitar Jerusalem) |
| 6 | MF | GRE | Charis Charisis (from (Greece) PAOK) |
| 7 | FW | BRA | Farley Rosa (from (Saudi Arabia) Al-Ettifaq) |
| 20 | FW | GRE | Petros Giakoumakis (from (Greece) Levadiakos) |
| 39 | FW | GRE | Apostolos Vellios (from (England) Nottingham Forest) |

Out:

| No. | Pos. | Nation | Player |
|---|---|---|---|
| 11 | FW | BRA | Bruno (loan return to (Austria) LASK) |
| — | MF | EGY | Amr Warda (loan return to (Greece) PAOK) |

=== Lamia ===
In:

| No. | Pos. | Nation | Player |

Out:

| No. | Pos. | Nation | Player |

=== OFI ===
In:

| No. | Pos. | Nation | Player |

Out:

| No. | Pos. | Nation | Player |
|---|---|---|---|
| 5 | DF | GRE | Leonidas Argyropoulos (released) |
| 8 | MF | GRE | Vasilios Koutsianikoulis (released) |
| 9 | FW | CIV | Patrick Vouho (released) |
| 11 | DF | GRE | Pavlos Kyriakidis (released) |
| 17 | MF | GRE | Manolis Papasterianos (released) |
| 20 | DF | GRE | Dimitris Komesidis (released) |
| 24 | DF | GRE | Tasos Papazoglou (released) |

=== Olympiacos ===
In:

| No. | Pos. | Nation | Player |
|---|---|---|---|
| 1 | GK | POR | José Sá (from (Portugal) Porto, previously on loan) |
| 2 | MF | ALG | Hillal Soudani (from (England) Nottingham Forest) |
| 18 | MF | BRA | Bruno (from (Austria) LASK, previously on loan at Atromitos) |
| 28 | MF | FRA | Mathieu Valbuena (from (Turkey) Fenerbahçe) |
| — | FW | BEL | Hugo Cuypers (from Ergotelis) |
| — | FW | ALB | Fiorin Durmishaj (from Panionios) |

Out:

| No. | Pos. | Nation | Player |

=== Panathinaikos ===
In:

| No. | Pos. | Nation | Player |
|---|---|---|---|
| 7 | FW | GRE | Dimitris Kolovos (from (Cyprus) Omonia) |
| 10 | FW | NOR | Ghayas Zahid (from (Cyprus) APOEL) |
| 30 | DF | POR | João Nunes (from (Poland) Lechia Gdańsk) |
| 77 | FW | ITA | Christian Konan (from (France) Bordeaux) |
| 14 | FW | FRA | Yohan Mollo (from (France) Sochaux) |

Out:

| No. | Pos. | Nation | Player |
|---|---|---|---|
| 78 | DF | MLI | Ousmane Coulibaly (released) |

=== Panetolikos ===
In:

| No. | Pos. | Nation | Player |

Out:

| No. | Pos. | Nation | Player |
|---|---|---|---|
| 66 | DF | ALB | Enea Mihaj (to PAOK) |

=== Panionios ===
In:

| No. | Pos. | Nation | Player |

Out:

| No. | Pos. | Nation | Player |
|---|---|---|---|
| 9 | FW | GRE | Fiorin Durmishaj (to Olympiacos) |

=== PAOK ===
In:

| No. | Pos. | Nation | Player |
|---|---|---|---|
| 2 | DF | BRA | Rodrigo Soares (from (Portugal) Desportivo das Aves) |
| 6 | DF | ALB | Enea Mihaj (from Panetolikos) |
| 14 | MF | GRE | Dimitrios Meliopoulos (from Xanthi) |
| 24 | MF | NGR | Anderson Esiti (from (Belgium) Gent) |
| 33 | MF | BRA | Douglas (from (Brazil) Corinthians, previously on loan at (Brazil) Bahia) |
| 88 | GK | SRB | Živko Živković (from Xanthi) |
| 99 | FW | SVK | Miroslav Stoch (from (Czech Republic) Slavia Prague) |

Out:

| No. | Pos. | Nation | Player |
|---|---|---|---|
| 1 | GK | ARG | Rodrigo Rey (on loan to (Mexico) Pachuca) |
| 11 | FW | GRE | Nikos Karelis (loan return to (Belgium) Genk) |
| 87 | MF | ESP | José Cañas (to (Serbia) Red Star Belgrade) |
| 71 | GK | GRE | Panagiotis Glykos (released) |
| 13 | DF | GRE | Stelios Malezas (to (Greece) Xanthi) |
| 28 | MF | UKR | Yevhen Shakhov (to (Italy) Lecce) |

=== Volos ===
In:

| No. | Pos. | Nation | Player |

Out:

| No. | Pos. | Nation | Player |

=== Xanthi ===
In:

| No. | Pos. | Nation | Player |

Out:

| No. | Pos. | Nation | Player |
|---|---|---|---|
| 1 | GK | GRE | Thanasis Garavelis (released) |
| 4 | DF | POR | Dinis Almeida (loan return to (France) Monaco) |
| 7 | MF | GHA | Jeffrey Sarpong (released) |
| 15 | DF | GRE | Okan Chatziterzoglou (released) |
| 20 | GK | SRB | Živko Živković (to PAOK) |
| 26 | FW | SVK | Erik Jendrišek (released) |
| 30 | MF | GRE | Dimitrios Meliopoulos (to PAOK) |
| 77 | FW | CPV | Brito (released) |
| 97 | MF | GRE | Rafail Melissopoulos (released) |

== Super League 2 ==
=== Apollon Larissa ===
In:

| No. | Pos. | Nation | Player |

Out:

| No. | Pos. | Nation | Player |

=== Apollon Pontus ===
In:

| No. | Pos. | Nation | Player |

Out:

| No. | Pos. | Nation | Player |

=== Apollon Smyrnis ===
In:

| No. | Pos. | Nation | Player |

Out:

| No. | Pos. | Nation | Player |
|---|---|---|---|
| 97 | GK | GRE | Lefteris Astras (released) |

=== Chania ===
In:

| No. | Pos. | Nation | Player |

Out:

| No. | Pos. | Nation | Player |

=== Doxa Drama ===
In:

| No. | Pos. | Nation | Player |

Out:

| No. | Pos. | Nation | Player |

=== Ergotelis ===
In:

| No. | Pos. | Nation | Player |
|---|---|---|---|
| — | MF | GRE | Vasilis Vogiatzis (Loan return from O.F. Ierapetra) |
| — | DF | SVK | Dominik Špiriak (on loan from (Slovakia) DAC Dunajská Streda) |
| — | MF | POR | Vítor Barata (from (Portugal) Marítimo B) |
| — | DF | BRA | Arthur Bothe (from (Portugal) Sintrense) |
| — | MF | BRA | Murilo Cadina (from (Ukraine) Lviv) |
| — | DF | GRE | Nikos Peios (from Olympiacos U–20) |
| — | MF | GRE | Antonis Alexakis (from Youth system) |
| — | FW | GRE | Nektarios Azizi (from OFI U19) |
| — | DF | GRE | Michalis Bousis (on loan from AEK Athens) |

Out:

| No. | Pos. | Nation | Player |
|---|---|---|---|
| — | DF | GRE | Stelios Labakis (released) |
| — | DF | CMR | Patrick Bahanack (loan return to (France) Reims) |
| — | FW | BEL | Hugo Cuypers (to Olympiacos) |
| — | MF | GRE | Ilias Tselios (loan return to AEK) |
| — | MF | GRE | Vasilis Vogiatzis (to O.F. Ierapetra) |
| — | DF | GRE | Kyriakos Mazoulouxis (released) |
| — | FW | GRE | Antonis Kapnidis (released) |
| — | MF | GRE | Konstantinos Chatzidimpas (released) |

=== Karaiskakis ===
In:

| No. | Pos. | Nation | Player |

Out:

| No. | Pos. | Nation | Player |

=== Kerkyra ===
In:

| No. | Pos. | Nation | Player |

Out:

| No. | Pos. | Nation | Player |

=== Levadiakos ===
In:

| No. | Pos. | Nation | Player |

Out:

| No. | Pos. | Nation | Player |

=== Panachaiki ===
In:

| No. | Pos. | Nation | Player |

Out:

| No. | Pos. | Nation | Player |

=== PAS Giannina ===
In:

| No. | Pos. | Nation | Player |
|---|---|---|---|
| 1 | GK | GRE | Makis Giannikoglou (from AEK Athens) |
| - | MF | UKR | Orest Kuzyk (Loan return from (Ukraine) Dnipro-1) |
| - | DF | GRE | Vasilis Zogos (Loan return from (Italy) Alessandria) |
| - | MF | GRE | Alexandros Kartalis (from (Germany) FSV Zwickau) |
| - | DF | GRE | Angelos Zioulis (from Kissamikos) |
| - | MF | BIH | Samir Radovac (from (Bosnia and Herzegovina) FK Olimpik) |
| - | MF | GRE | Christos Eleftheriadis (from Panachaiki) |
| - | MF | ARG | Miguel Sebastián Garcia (from Volos) |
| - | DF | GRE | Antonis Oikonomopoulos (from Apollon Smyrnis) |
| - | DF | GRE | Pantelis Panourgias (from (Netherlands) PEC Zwolle) |
| - | DF | GRE | Epaminondas Pantelakis (from Panathinaikos) |
| - | GK | GRE | Lefteris Choutesiotis (from Olympiacos) |

Out:

| No. | Pos. | Nation | Player |
|---|---|---|---|
| 3 | MF | ALB | Andi Lila (released) |
| 4 | DF | GRE | Stefanos Evangelou (loan return to Olympiacos) |
| 6 | DF | GRE | Alexios Michail (released) |
| 7 | MF | GRE | Evripidis Giakos (to AEL) |
| 8 | DF | NZL | Themistoklis Tzimopoulos (released) |
| 9 | FW | GRE | Stefanos Athanasiadis (released) |
| 19 | DF | GRE | Giannis Kargas (to (Bulgaria) Levski Sofia) |
| 20 | MF | GRE | Konstantinos Papadopoulos (released) |
| 27 | FW | GRE | Dimitrios Manos (loan return to Olympiacos) |
| 30 | GK | GRE | Giorgos Papaioannou (released) |
| 33 | MF | BRA | Higor Vidal (released) |
| 35 | MF | SRB | Dušan Pantelić (to (Serbia) FK Radnički Niš) |
| 39 | GK | GRE | Marcos Vellidis (released) |
| 55 | MF | SRB | Enes Dolovac (released) |
| 93 | GK | CYP | Neofytos Michael (loan return to (Cyprus) APOEL) |
| - | MF | UKR | Orest Kuzyk (on loan to (Ukraine) FC Desna Chernihiv) |
| - | DF | GRE | Spyros Vasilakis (on loan to Souli Paramythia F.C.) |

=== Platanias ===
In:

| No. | Pos. | Nation | Player |

Out:

| No. | Pos. | Nation | Player |
