= 2020–21 Greek Football Cup =

2020–21 Greek Cup

Tournament details
- Country: Greece
- Teams: 14

Final positions
- Champions: PAOK (8th title)
- Runners-up: Olympiacos

Tournament statistics
- Matches played: 25
- Goals scored: 76 (3.04 per match)
- Top goal scorer(s): Christos Tzolis; Michael Krmenčík (5 goals each)

The 2020–21 Greek Football Cup was the 79th edition of the Greek Football Cup. It took place with the participation of the 14 clubs from the Super League 1, as there was no competitive action in the lower divisions (Super League 2, Football League and Gamma Ethniki) until early January due to the COVID-19 pandemic. The Hellenic Football Federation decided that the Cup would be held with the participation of teams only from the Super League, which was running normally. The winner of the Cup qualified for the next season's Europa Conference League third qualifying round.

== Calendar ==
Round	Date(s)	Fixtures	Clubs	New entries
First round	20, 21 January and 3, 4 February 2021	12	14 → 8	12
Quarter-finals	10, 11, 18 February and 3, 4 March 2021	8	8 → 4	2
Semi-finals	7 April and 28, 29 April 2021	4	4 → 2	none
Final	22 May 2021	1	2 → 1	none

== Bracket ==
First round
1	PAS Giannina	2	3	5
16	Atromitos	2	2	4
8	Panathinaikos (bye)
5	Panetolikos	0	0	0
12	Olympiacos	3	3	6
4	Aris	2	2	4
13	Asteras Tripolis	0	0	0
6	AEK Athens	2	1	3
11	Apollon Smyrnis	0	2	2
3	Volos	2	1	3
14	OFI	0	1	1
7	PAOK	5	2	7
10	AEL	0	1	1
2	Lamia (bye)

Quarter-finals
PAS Giannina	2	2	4
Panathinaikos	1	1	2
Olympiacos	2	1	3
Aris	1	1	2
AEK Athens	4	0	4
Volos	2	1	3
PAOK	5	1	6
Lamia	2	1	3

Semi-finals
PAS Giannina	1	2	3
Olympiacos	1	3	4
AEK Athens	0	1	1
PAOK	1	2	3

Final
Olympiacos	1
PAOK	2

== First round ==
The draw for this round took place on 5 January 2021.

=== Summary ===
Team 1	Agg.	Team 2	1st leg	2nd leg
PAOK	7–1	AEL	5–0	2–1
Volos	3–1	OFI	2–0	1–1
PAS Giannina	5–4	Atromitos	2–2	3–2
Aris	4–0	Asteras Tripolis	2–0	2–0
AEK Athens	3–2	Apollon Smyrnis	2–0	1–2
Panetolikos	0–6	Olympiacos	0–3	0–3
Panathinaikos	bye			
Lamia	bye			

=== Matches ===
20 January 2021
17:15 EET

PAOK	5–0	AEL
Tzolis 9', 23', 74'; Krmenčík 47'; Ingason 55'	Report

Toumba Stadium, Thessaloniki
Attendance: Behind closed doors
Referee: Evangelos Gratsanis (Trikala)
3 February 2021
19:30 EET

AEL	1–2	PAOK
Pereira 39' (o.g.)	Report	Tsingaras 19'; Krmenčík 29'

AEL FC Arena, Larissa
Attendance: Behind closed doors
Referee: Alexandros Tsakalidis (Chalkidiki)

PAOK won 7–1 on aggregate.

20 January 2021
15:00 EET

Volos	2–0	OFI
Martínez 52'; Mitoglou 85'	Report

Panthessaliko Stadium, Volos
Attendance: Behind closed doors
Referee: Georgios Vreskas (Pieria)
4 February 2021
15:00 EET

OFI	1–1	Volos
Sardinero 12'	Report	Douvikas 19'

Theodoros Vardinogiannis Stadium, Heraklion
Attendance: Behind closed doors
Referee: Evangelos Manouchos (Argolida)

Volos won 3–1 on aggregate.

21 January 2021
19:30 EET

PAS Giannina	2–2	Atromitos
Eleftheriadis 34' (pen.); Léo 68'	Report	Stroungis 24'; Goutas 44'

Zosimades Stadium, Ioannina
Attendance: Behind closed doors
Referee: Athanasios Sezos (Kilkis)
3 February 2021
15:00 EET

Atromitos	2–3	PAS Giannina
Kotsopoulos 28', 82'	Report	Naumets 3'; Milinceanu 10'; Saliakas 13'

Peristeri Stadium, Peristeri
Attendance: Behind closed doors
Referee: Vasilis Fotias (Pella)

PAS Giannina won 5–4 on aggregate.

20 January 2021
15:00 EET

Aris	2–0	Asteras Tripolis
Mancini 69'; Bertoglio 75'	Report

Kleanthis Vikelidis Stadium, Thessaloniki
Attendance: Behind closed doors
Referee: Aristidis Vatsios (West Attica)
4 February 2021
17:15 EET

Asteras Tripolis	0–2	Aris
	Report	Manos 45'; García 68'

Theodoros Kolokotronis Stadium, Tripoli
Attendance: Behind closed doors
Referee: Anastasios Sidiropoulos (Dodecanese)

Aris won 4–0 on aggregate.

20 January 2021
21:30 EET

AEK Athens	2–0	Apollon Smyrnis
Szymański 7'; García 88'	Report

Olympic Stadium, Marousi
Attendance: Behind closed doors
Referee: Alexandros Tsakalidis (Chalkidiki)
4 February 2021
19:30 EET

Apollon Smyrnis	2–1	AEK Athens
Dauda 15'; Lagos 27'	Report	Oliveira 20'

Georgios Kamaras Stadium, Rizoupoli
Attendance: Behind closed doors
Referee: Giorgos Tzovaras (Phthiotis)

AEK Athens won 3–2 on aggregate.

20 January 2021
19:30 EET

Panetolikos	0–3	Olympiacos
	Report	Bruma 20'; Vrousai 65'; Cissé 85'

Panetolikos Stadium, Agrinio
Attendance: Behind closed doors
Referee: Konstantinos Tsetsilas (Grevena)
3 February 2021
17:15 EET

Olympiacos	3–0	Panetolikos
Masouras 9'; Cuypers 30'; Androutsos 81'	Report

Karaiskakis Stadium, Piraeus
Attendance: Behind closed doors
Referee: Evangelos Gratsanis (Trikala)

Olympiacos won 6–0 on aggregate.

== Quarter-finals ==
The draw for this round took place on 5 February 2021. Shortly afterwards, Olympiacos vice-president Kostas Karapapas and Aris president Theodoros Karypidis both implied that the draw was fixed and claimed that some of the balls used during the procedure by the HFF representative and chairman of the Greek Cup Committee Manos Gavrielidis were previously heated. Gavrielidis stated that there was a livestream of the draw and everything was performed according to the restrictions concerning the COVID-19 pandemic which forbade the presence of club representatives, a rule that was also applied in the previous round's draw. The HFF issued a statement later that day denouncing the accusation as ridiculous and absurd. Olympiacos issued a statement in response, insisting that the draw was fixed by the Federation and accusing the HFF representatives of being corrupt and responsible for the total degradation of the competition and of Greek football in general.

=== Summary ===
Team 1	Agg.	Team 2	1st leg	2nd leg
PAOK	6–3	Lamia	5–2	1–1
Olympiacos	3–2	Aris	2–1	1–1
AEK Athens	4–3	Volos	4–2	0–1
PAS Giannina	4–2	Panathinaikos	2–1	2–1

=== Matches ===
10 February 2021
19:00 EET

PAOK	5–2	Lamia
Tzolis 6', 67'; Schwab 16'; Rodrigo 82'; Krmenčík 88'	Report	Adejo 11'; Bejarano 24'

Toumba, Thessaloniki
Attendance: Behind closed doors
Referee: Aristidis Vatsios (West Attica)
3 March 2021
18:00 EET

Lamia	1–1	PAOK
James 52'	Report	Ninua 14'

Lamia Municipal Stadium, Lamia
Attendance: Behind closed doors
Referee: Evangelos Manouhos (Argolida)

PAOK won 6–3 on aggregate.

10 February 2021
21:30 EET

Olympiacos	2–1	Aris
Hassan 1', 14'	Report	Ba 4' (o.g.)

Karaiskakis Stadium, Piraeus
Attendance: Behind closed doors
Referee: Dimitris Karantonis (Imathia)
3 March 2021
20:00 EET

Aris	1–1	Olympiacos
Gama 54' (pen.)	Report	Bouchalakis 87'

Kleanthis Vikelidis Stadium, Thessaloniki
Attendance: Behind closed doors
Referee: Mattias Gestranius (Finland)

Olympiacos won 3–2 on aggregate.

10 February 2021
17:00 EET

AEK Athens	4–2	Volos
Mantalos 25'; Tankovic 29', 32'; Oliveira 36' (pen.)	Report	Douvikas 14'; Mitoglou 57'

Olympic Stadium, Marousi
Attendance: Behind closed doors
Referee: Vasilis Fotias (Pella)
4 March 2021
18:00 EET

Volos	1–0	AEK Athens
Douvikas 35' (pen.)	Report

Panthessaliko Stadium, Volos
Attendance: Behind closed doors
Referee: Giorgos Tzovaras (Phthiotis)

AEK Athens won 4–3 on aggregate.

18 February 2021
15:00 EET

PAS Giannina	2–1	Panathinaikos
Pamlidis 21'; Kargas 66'	Report	Macheda 2'

Panetolikos Stadium, Agrinio
Attendance: Behind closed doors
Referee: Athanasios Tzilos (Larissa)

The match was held at Panetolikos Stadium due to the inappropriateness of the Zosimades Stadium.

2 March 2021
16:00 EET

Panathinaikos	1–2	PAS Giannina
Poungouras 74'	Report	Pantelakis 2'; Chatzitheodoridis 9' (o.g.)

Leoforos Alexandras Stadium, Ampelokipoi
Attendance: Behind closed doors
Referee: Kirill Levnikov (Russia)

PAS Giannina won 4–2 on aggregate.

== Semi-finals ==
The draw for this round took place on 16 March 2021.

=== Summary ===
Team 1	Agg.	Team 2	1st leg	2nd leg
PAS Giannina	2–4	Olympiacos	1–1	1–3
AEK Athens	1–3	PAOK	0–1	1–2

=== Matches ===
7 April 2021
18:00 EEST

PAS Giannina	1–1	Olympiacos
Erramuspe 45' (pen.)	Report	Hassan 73'

Zosimades Stadium, Ioannina
Attendance: Behind closed doors
Referee: Andris Treimanis (Latvia)
28 April 2021
19:00 EEST

Olympiacos	3–1	PAS Giannina
El-Arabi 26' (pen.), 41'; Bruma 56'	Report	Kartalis 51'

Karaiskakis Stadium, Piraeus
Attendance: Behind closed doors
Referee: Paweł Raczkowski (Poland)

Olympiacos won 4–2 on aggregate.

7 April 2021
20:00 EEST

AEK Athens	0–1	PAOK
	Report	Murg 90+4'

Olympic Stadium, Marousi
Attendance: Behind closed doors
Referee: Georgi Kabakov (Bulgaria)
29 April 2021
19:00 EEST

PAOK	2–1	AEK Athens
Krmenčík 84'; Živković 90+6'	Report	Galanopoulos 69'

Toumba Stadium, Thessaloniki
Attendance: Behind closed doors
Referee: Daniele Doveri (Italy)

PAOK won 3–1 on aggregate.

== Final ==
22 May 2021
21:00 EEST

Olympiacos	1–2	PAOK
M'Vila 50'	Report	Vieirinha 36' (pen.); Krmenčík 90'

Olympic Stadium, Marousi
Attendance: Behind closed doors
Referee: Danny Makkelie (Netherlands)

== Top scorers ==
Rank	Player	Club	Goals
1	(Greece) Christos Tzolis	PAOK	5
1	(Czech Republic) Michael Krmenčík	PAOK	5
3	(Greece) Anastasios Douvikas	Volos	2
3	(Egypt) Ahmed Hassan	Olympiacos	2
3	(Greece) Konstantinos Kotsopoulos	Atromitos	2
3	(Greece) Gerasimos Mitoglou	Volos	2
3	(Portugal) Nélson Oliveira	AEK Athens	2
3	(Morocco) Youssef El-Arabi	Olympiacos	2
3	(Sweden) Muamer Tanković	AEK Athens	2
3	(Portugal) Bruma	Olympiacos	2
