= Yuri Lodygin =

Russian footballer (born 1990)

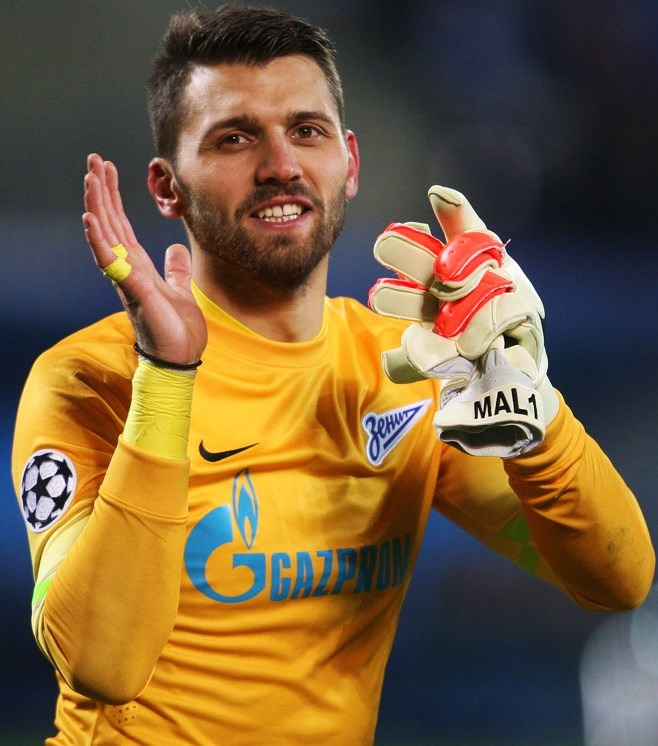
- Lodygin with Zenit Saint Petersburg in 2014

Personal information
- Full name: Yuri Vladimirovich Lodygin
- Date of birth: 26 May 1990 (age 36)
- Place of birth: Vladimir, Russian SFSR, Soviet Union
- Height: 1.88 m (6 ft 2 in)
- Position: Goalkeeper

Youth career
- 2008–2009: Skoda Xanthi

Senior career*
Years	Team	Apps	(Gls)
2009–2013	Skoda Xanthi	24	(0)
2010–2011	→ Eordaikos (loan)	25	(0)
2013–2019	Zenit Saint Petersburg	111	(0)
2019	→ Olympiacos (loan)	2	(0)
2019–2020	Gaziantep	2	(0)
2020	Arsenal Tula	2	(0)
2021–2022	PAS Giannina	45	(0)
2022–2025	Panathinaikos	21	(0)
2025–2026	Levadiakos	27	(0)
2026	Volos	1	(0)

International career
2010–2012	Greece U21	3	(0)
2013–2016	Russia	11	(0)
- * Club domestic league appearances and goals as of 20 September 2026

Yuri Lodygin (Russian: Юрий Лодыгин, Greek: Γιούρι Λοντίγκιν; born 26 May 1990) is a Russian-Greek professional footballer who plays as a goalkeeper. Although he represented the Russia national team at senior level, he had previously represented Greece at youth level.

== Club career ==
Born in Vladimir to a Russian father and a Pontic Greek mother, Lodygin has lived in Greece since 2000, playing for Skoda Xanthi, coming from the youth team. During the 2008–09 season, his performances with the Skoda Xanthi U21 team lead to his first professional contract with the first team, which he signed on 17 June 2009.

He was then loaned at Eordaikos 2007 for the 2010–11 season, where he made 25 first team appearances. He later returned to Skoda Xanthi, where he made his first appearance in the last match of the season against Ergotelis; since the 2012–13 season, he has been a member of the starting line-up. He was a member of the Greek U21 Football Team.

=== Zenit Saint Petersburg ===
In June 2013, Lodygin moved to Russia, joining Zenit Saint Petersburg for a fee of €800,000.

=== Olympiacos ===
On 27 January 2019, he returned to Greece, joining Olympiacos on loan until the end of the 2018–19 season.

On 16 June 2019, general director of Zenit Aleksandr Medvedev announced that the club will not offer Lodygin a contract extension for 2019–20 season.

On 3 August 2019, he signed a two-year contract with the Turkish club Gazişehir Gaziantep. On 10 January 2020 he announced that he left Gazişehir Gaziantep.

On 18 February 2020, he signed with Russian Premier League club Arsenal Tula until the end of the 2019–20 season.

=== PAS Giannina ===
On 20 January 2021, Lodygin joined Super League Greece side PAS Giannina. On 27 January 2021 he made his debut against AEK Athens at the Olympic Stadium in Athens, winning 2–0. He also played against Panathinaikos, progressing into the semi-final of the Greek Cup.

On 8 May 2021, he extended his contract with Ioannina for one additional year. During his time on PAS Giannina, he managed to establish himself as the first choice keeper immediately after signing, replacing Lefteris Choutesiotis. Due to his winning mentality, character, leadership and great personality, Lodygin was one of the most important players for PAS Giannina on the 2021-22 campaign. Moreover, his attitude and goalkeeping skills helped him gain many fans, making him very popular among the club's fanbase. He is regarded as a club legend, as the best goalkeeper, and one of the best players to ever play for PAS Giannina.

=== Panathinaikos ===
On 4 June 2022, he signed a two-year deal with Panathinaikos. On 15 December 2022 he made his debut with the new club against Volos in Greek Cup.

== International career ==
Lodygin represented Greece internationally at youth level, obtaining three caps with the U21 side between 2010 and 2012. He was called up to the Greece senior squad in May 2013. He was called up again in August 2013, but he refused to report. He was called up by Fabio Capello to the Russian squad for the first time on 4 October 2013 for the team's 2014 FIFA World Cup qualification matches against Luxembourg and Azerbaijan. He made his debut for Russia on 19 November 2013 in a friendly against South Korea. On 2 June 2014, he was included in Russia's 2014 FIFA World Cup squad. Igor Akinfeev played in goal for all of their matches in a group stage exit. He was also included in Russia's Euro 2016 squad. After an eight-year break, Lodygin was called up to the national team once again for friendlies in March 2024.

== Career statistics ==
=== Club ===
As of match played 7 April 2026

Club	Season	League			National cup (Note: Includes Greek Football Cup, Russian Cup, Turkish Cup)		Europe		Other		Total	
Club	Season	Division	Apps	Goals	Apps	Goals	Apps	Goals	Apps	Goals	Apps	Goals
Eordaikos	2010–11	Football League (Greece)	25	0	2	0	–		–		27	0
Skoda Xanthi	2011–12	Super League Greece	1	0	0	0	–		–		1	0
Skoda Xanthi	2012–13	Super League Greece	23	0	1	0	–		–		24	0
Skoda Xanthi	Total		24	0	1	0	–		–		25	0
Zenit St. Petersburg	2013–14	Russian Premier League	30	0	0	0	11 (Note: Appearances in UEFA Champions League)	0	1 (Note: Appearance in Russian Super Cup)	0	42	0
Zenit St. Petersburg	2014–15	Russian Premier League	28	0	0	0	16 (Note: Ten appearances in UEFA Champions League, one appearance in UEFA Europa League)	0	–		44	0
Zenit St. Petersburg	2015–16	Russian Premier League	27	0	3	0	6	0	1	0	37	0
Zenit St. Petersburg	2016–17	Russian Premier League	15	0	2	0	7 (Note: Appearances in UEFA Europa League)	0	1	0	25	0
Zenit St. Petersburg	2017–18	Russian Premier League	11	0	1	0	3	0	–		15	0
Zenit St. Petersburg	2018–19	Russian Premier League	0	0	0	0	1	0	–		1	0
Zenit St. Petersburg	Total		111	0	6	0	44	0	3	0	164	0
Olympiacos	2018–19	Super League Greece	2	0	1	0	0	0	–		3	0
Gaziantep	2019–20	Süper Lig	2	0	3	0	–		–		5	0
Arsenal Tula	2019–20	Russian Premier League	2	0	–		–		–		2	0
PAS Giannina	2020–21	Super League Greece	13	0	4	0	–		–		17	0
PAS Giannina	2021–22	Super League Greece	32	0	1	0	–		–		33	0
PAS Giannina	Total		45	0	5	0	–		–		50	0
Panathinaikos	2022–23	Super League Greece	2	0	4	0	0	0	–		6	0
Panathinaikos	2023–24	Super League Greece	15	0	3	0	1	0	–		19	0
Panathinaikos	2024–25	Super League Greece	4	0	4	0	3	0	–		11	0
Panathinaikos	Total		21	0	11	0	4	0	0	0	36	0
Levadiakos	2025–26	Super League Greece	25	0	4	0	–		–		29	0
Career total			257	0	32	0	48	0	3	0	340	0

=== International ===
Russia
Year	Apps	Goals
2013	1	0
2014	5	0
2015	3	0
2016	2	0
Total	11	0

== Honours ==
=== Club ===
Zenit Saint Petersburg

- Russian Premier League: 2014–15
- Russian Cup: 2015–16
- Russian Super Cup: 2015, 2016

Panathinaikos

- Greek Cup: 2023–24

=== Individual ===
- Super League Greece Goalkeeper of the Season: 2021–22
- Super League Greece Team of the Season: 2021–22
- Most clean sheets in Super League Greece: 2021–22
