= Vasilios Athanasiou =

Greek footballer (born 1999)

Personal information
- Date of birth: 24 July 1999 (age 27)
- Place of birth: Aigio, Greece
- Height: 1.88 m (6 ft 2 in)
- Position: Goalkeeper

Team information
- Current team: Atromitos
- Number: 31

Youth career
- –2015: Thyella Aigio
- 2015–2016: Panegialios

Senior career*
Years	Team	Apps	(Gls)
2016–2018	Panegialios	11	(0)
2018–2019	AlbinoLeffe	0	(0)
2019–2020	Mantova	8	(0)
2020–2025	PAS Giannina	35	(0)
2025–	Atromitos	0	(0)

International career^{‡}
2018	Greece U19	2	(0)
- * Club domestic league appearances and goals as of 7 August 2025 ‡ National team caps and goals as of 22 February 2018

Vasilios Athanasiou (Greek: Βασίλειος Αθανασίου; born 24 July 1999) is a Greek professional footballer who plays as a goalkeeper for Super League club Atromitos.

== Career ==
On 29 September 2020, Athanasiou transferred to PAS Giannina. Athanasiou made his debut for the first team on 17 January 2021, replacing Lefteris Choutesiotis on half time against Olympiacos at Karaiskakis.
