= Angelos Liasos =

Greek footballer

Personal information
- Date of birth: 26 May 2000 (age 26)
- Place of birth: Florina, Greece
- Height: 1.85 m (6 ft 1 in)
- Position: Defensive midfielder

Team information
- Current team: Panionios

Youth career
- 2010–2014: PAS Florina
- 2014–2018: PAS Giannina

Senior career*
Years	Team	Apps	(Gls)
2018–2024	PAS Giannina	104	(3)
2024–2026	Panserraikos	45	(0)
2026–	Panionios	0	(0)

International career^{‡}
2021–2022	Greece U21	5	(0)
- * Club domestic league appearances and goals as of 14 June 2026 ‡ National team caps and goals as of 11 June 2022

Angelos Liasos (Greek: Άγγελος Λιάσος; born 26 May 2000) is a Greek professional footballer who plays as a defensive midfielder for Super League 2 club Panionios.

== Career ==
Liasos started from PAS Florina's youth setup. He transferred to PAS Giannina's youth setup. He signed a professional contract in January 2018. He made his professional debut against Panachaiki on 29 September 2019. Liasos scored his first goal against Volos FC on 17 April 2021 in a Greek Super League play out match.

== Career statistics ==
As of 4 July 2024

Club	Season	League			Cup		Continental		Other		Total	
Club	Season	Division	Apps	Goals	Apps	Goals	Apps	Goals	Apps	Goals	Apps	Goals
PAS Giannina	2017–18	Superleague Greece	0	0	0	0	—		—		0	0
PAS Giannina	2018–19	Superleague Greece	0	0	0	0	—		—		0	0
PAS Giannina	2019–20	Superleague Greece 2	14	0	5	0	—		—		19	0
PAS Giannina	2020–21	Superleague Greece	23	1	5	0	—		—		28	1
PAS Giannina	2021–22	Superleague Greece	26	0	1	0	—		—		27	0
PAS Giannina	2022–23	Superleague Greece	23	2	1	0	—		—		24	2
PAS Giannina	2023–24	Superleague Greece	18	0	0	0	—		—		18	0
PAS Giannina	Total		104	3	12	0	0	0	—		116	3
Career total			104	3	12	0	0	0	0	0	116	3

== Honours ==
PAS Giannina

- Super League 2: 2019–20
