= Alexandros Lolis =

Greek footballer

Personal information
- Date of birth: 5 September 2002 (age 24)
- Place of birth: Igoumenitsa, Greece
- Height: 1.80 m (5 ft 11 in)
- Position: Midfielder

Team information
- Current team: Olympiakos Nicosia
- Number: 11

Youth career
- 2016–2019: PAS Giannina

Senior career*
Years	Team	Apps	(Gls)
2019–2025	PAS Giannina	68	(1)
2024	→ Giouchtas (loan)	19	(3)
2025–2026	Niki Volos	20	(5)
2026–	Olympiakos Nicosia	0	(0)

International career^{‡}
2020–2022	Greece U21	5	(0)
- * Club domestic league appearances and goals as of 2 April 2026 ‡ National team caps and goals as of 6 June 2022

Alexandros Lolis (Greek: Αλέξανδρος Λώλης; born 5 September 2002) is a Greek professional footballer who plays as a midfielder for Cypriot First Division club Olympiakos Nicosia.

== Club career ==
Lolis was part of PAS Giannina youth system before he signed a professional contract in summer 2019. On 1 December 2019, Lolis made his professional debut for PAS Giannina against Platanias. On 27 September 2020, Lolis made his debut in Super League Greece, against Aris at the Kleanthis Vikelidis Stadium in a 2–2 draw.

== International career ==
Lolis represented Greece internationally at youth level, making his debut against Scotland.

== Personal life ==
Alexandros Lolis is a cousin of Nikos Lolis.

== Career statistics ==
As of 2 April 2026

Club	Season	League			Cup		Continental		Other		Total	
Club	Season	Division	Apps	Goals	Apps	Goals	Apps	Goals	Apps	Goals	Apps	Goals
PAS Giannina	2019–20	Superleague Greece 2	5	0	1	0	—		—		6	0
PAS Giannina	2020–21	Superleague Greece	10	0	3	0	—		—		13	0
PAS Giannina	2021–22	Superleague Greece	20	0	0	0	—		—		20	0
PAS Giannina	2022–23	Superleague Greece	11	0	1	0	—		—		12	0
PAS Giannina	2023–24	Superleague Greece	2	0	1	0	—		—		3	0
PAS Giannina	2024–25	Superleague Greece 2	20	1	0	0	—		—		20	1
PAS Giannina	Total		68	1	6	0	—		—		74	1
Giouchtas (loan)	2024–25	Superleague Greece 2	19	3	0	0	—		—		19	3
Niki Volos	2025–26	Superleague Greece 2	20	5	1	1	—		—		21	6
Career total			107	9	7	1	0	0	0	0	114	10

== Honours ==
PAS Giannina

- Super League Greece 2: 2019–20
