= Nicolae Milinceanu =

Moldovan footballer

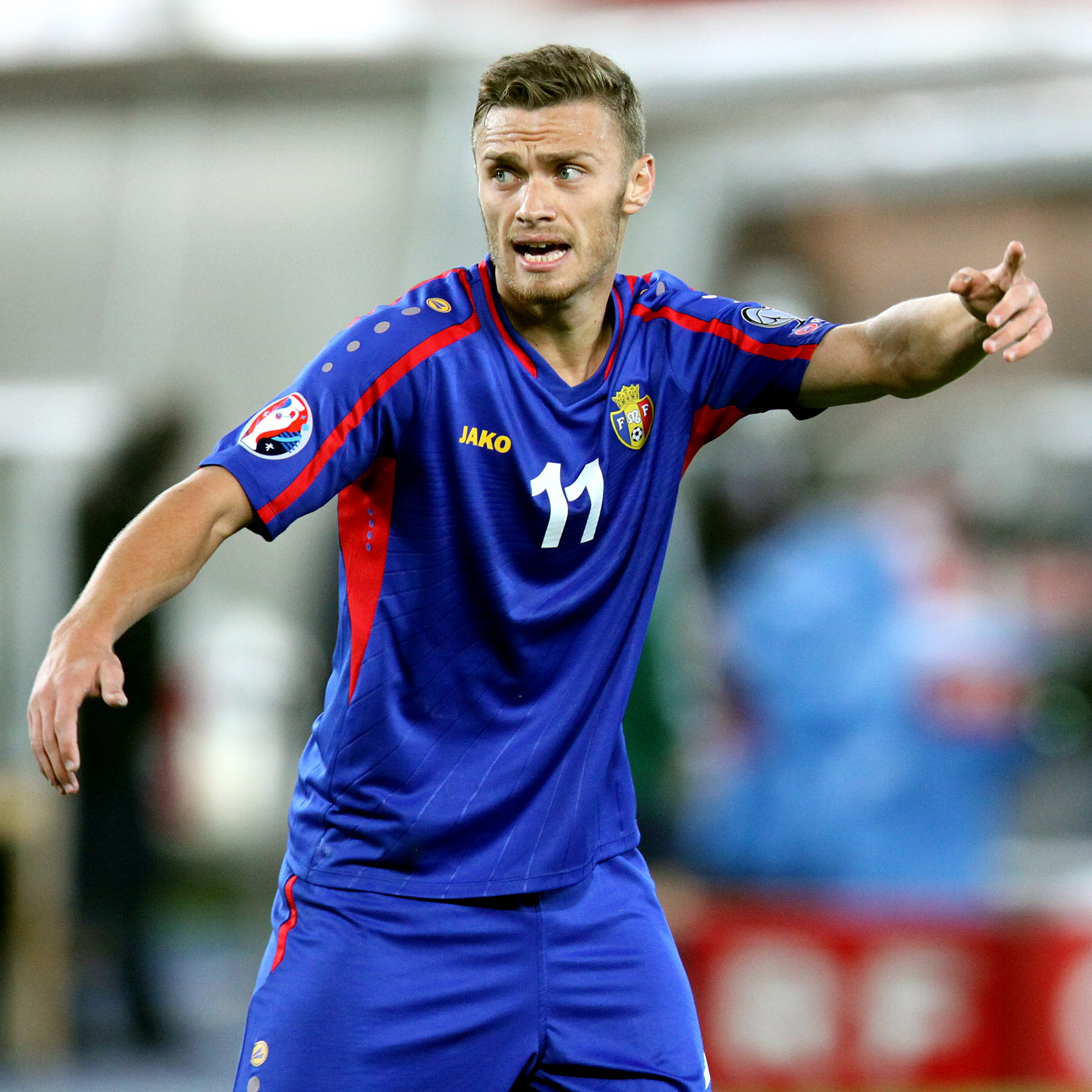
- Milinceanu with Moldova in 2015

Personal information
- Date of birth: 1 August 1992 (age 34)
- Place of birth: Chișinău, Moldova
- Height: 1.89 m (6 ft 2 in)
- Position: Forward

Team information
- Current team: Doxa Katokopias
- Number: 11

Youth career
- 2007–2011: Monaco

Senior career*
Years	Team	Apps	(Gls)
2012–2014	Veris Chișinău	43	(8)
2014	Rapid București	1	(0)
2015	Academia Chișinău	8	(0)
2015	Petrolul Ploiești	5	(0)
2016	Speranța Nisporeni	11	(2)
2016	Granit Mikashevichi	7	(0)
2017	Zimbru Chișinău	16	(1)
2017–2019	Chiasso	30	(8)
2017–2018	→ Sliema Wanderers (loan)	10	(3)
2019–2020	Vaduz	34	(6)
2021–2022	PAS Giannina	24	(3)
2022–2023	AEL Limassol	44	(8)
2023	Karmiotissa	2	(0)
2023–2024	Eendracht Aalst	22	(4)
2024–2025	Ethnikos Achna	8	(1)
2025–	Doxa Katokopias	25	(4)

International career^{‡}
2013–2014	Moldova U21 (Note: Only official UEFA matches included)	9	(4)
2015–2021	Moldova	15	(2)
- * Club domestic league appearances and goals as of 3 May 2026 ‡ National team caps and goals as of 7 September 2021

Nicolae Milinceanu (born 1 August 1992) is a Moldovan professional footballer who plays as a forward for Cypriot Second Division club Doxa Katokopias.

== Career ==
Milinceanu started his footballer career at Monaco, where he played from 2007 until 2011. From there, he moved to Rapid Bucharest until September 2014.

In 2015, Milinceanu transferred to Petrolul Ploiești He debuted for the Moldova national team that same year.

=== PAS Giannina ===
On 15 January 2021, Milinceanu moved to PAS Giannina in the Super League Greece. On 21 January 2021, he made his debut with his new team in Greek Cup against Atromitos in the season 2020–21 at the Zosimades Stadium, replacing Vladyslav Naumets in the second half. On 3 February 2021, he scored his first goal with the club in the Greek Cup in a 3–2 win against Atromitos at the Peristeri Stadium, allowing the club to qualify for the next round. On 6 March 2021, he scored his first goal in Super League Greece for the winning goal against Panathinaikos in the season 2020–21.

== Career statistics ==
=== International ===
Appearances and goals by national team and year
National team	Year	Apps	Goals
Moldova	2015	5	0
Moldova	2016	2	0
Moldova	2017	–	
Moldova	2018	–	
Moldova	2019	3	1
Moldova	2020	4	0
Moldova	2021	1	1
Total		15	2

Scores and results list Moldova's goal tally first, score column indicates score after each Milinceanu goal.

List of international goals scored by Nicolae Milinceanu
No.	Date	Venue	Opponent	Score	Result	Competition
1	17 November 2019	Zimbru Stadium, Chişinău, Moldova	Iceland	1–1	1–2	UEFA Euro 2020 qualification
2	7 September 2021	Tórsvøllur, Tórshavn, Faroe Islands	Faroe Islands	1–2	1–2	2022 FIFA World Cup qualification

== Honours ==
Veris Chișinău

- Divizia A: 2012–13
- Moldovan National Division third place: 2013–14

Monaco

- France U-17 Championship:
