= Domingues (footballer, born 1988) =

Brazilian footballer

Personal information
- Full name: Luiz Gustavo Domingues
- Date of birth: 28 September 1988 (age 38)
- Place of birth: Santo Antônio do Grama, Brazil
- Height: 1.90 m (6 ft 3 in)
- Position: Centre-back

Senior career*
Years	Team	Apps	(Gls)
- Oeste
2014–2017	Penapolense	23	(2)
2015	→ Bragantino (loan)	0	(0)
2015	→ Botafogo-SP (loan)	4	(0)
2015	→ Joinville (loan)	7	(0)
2016	→ Grêmio Novorizontino (loan)	15	(2)
2016–2017	→ Paysandu (loan)	15	(1)
2017	Grêmio Novorizontino	11	(0)
2017	Juventude	25	(0)
2017–2018	AD São Caetano	8	(0)
2018–2020	Panionios	48	(1)
2020–2023	Apollon Smyrnis	79	(2)
- * Club domestic league appearances and goals as of 16 June 2023

Luiz Gustavo Domingues (born 28 September 1988), commonly known as Domingues, is a Brazilian professional footballer who plays as a centre-back.
