= Rafail Melissopoulos =

Greek footballer

Personal information
- Date of birth: 12 February 1997 (age 29)
- Place of birth: Xanthi, Greece
- Height: 1.76 m (5 ft 9 in)
- Position: Forward

Team information
- Current team: Kavala
- Number: 14

Youth career
- –2018: Xanthi

Senior career*
Years	Team	Apps	(Gls)
2018–2019	Xanthi	4	(0)
2019–2020	Kavala	13	(2)
2020–2021	Apollon Paralimnio		
2021	Kavala	8	(0)

International career^{‡}
2015	Greece U19	5	(0)
- * Club domestic league appearances and goals as of 28 April 2021 ‡ National team caps and goals as of 31 December 2018

Rafail Melissopoulos (Greek: Ραφαήλ Μελισσόπουλος; born 12 February 1997) is a Greek professional footballer who plays as a forward for Football League club Kavala.
