= Santo Antônio do Grama =

- Municipality
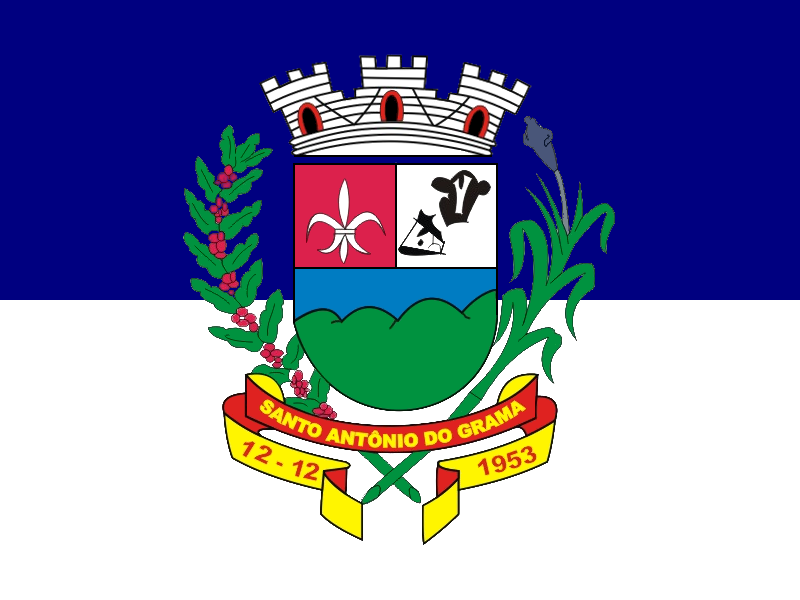
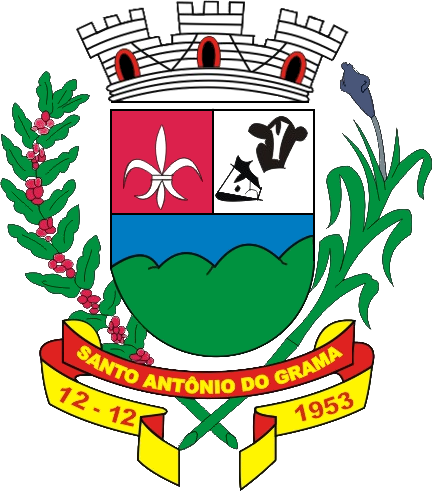
- Flag Coat of arms

- Location in Minas Gerais state

- Location in Brazil
- Coordinates: 20°18′50″S 42°36′32″W
- Country: Brazil
- Region: Southeast
- State: Minas Gerais
- Mesoregion: Zona da Mata
- Microregion: Ponte Nova

Area
  - Total: 130.21 km^{2} (50.27 sq mi)

Population (2020)
  - Total: 3,886
  - Density: 29.84/km^{2} (77.30/sq mi)
- Time zone: UTC−3 (BRT)
- Website: santoantoniodograma.mg.gov.br

Santo Antônio do Grama is a municipality in the state of Minas Gerais in Brazil. The population is 3,886 (2020 est.) in an area of 130.21 km^{2} (50.27 sq mi).

The city became prominent due to the mining accident in March 2018 where a mine piping from Anglo American plc leaked more than 300 tons of ore pulp to the local river, halting the water supply to the population.

== See also ==
- List of municipalities in Minas Gerais
