= Georgios Doumtsis =

Greek footballer

Personal information
- Date of birth: 4 March 2000 (age 26)
- Place of birth: Florina, Greece
- Height: 1.80 m (5 ft 11 in)
- Position: Winger

Team information
- Current team: Pannaxiakos

Youth career
- 2013–2020: PAOK

Senior career*
Years	Team	Apps	(Gls)
2020–2021	PAS Giannina	7	(0)
2021–2023	Athens Kallithea	7	(2)
2023–2024	Rodos	29	(7)
2024–2025	Niki Volos	14	(2)
2025	AEL	2	(0)
2025–2026	Anagennisi Karditsa	4	(0)
2026	Nestos Chrysoupoli	10	(1)
2026–	Pannaxiakos		

International career^{‡}
2018	Greece U19	3	(0)
- * Club domestic league appearances and goals as of 26 April 2026 ‡ National team caps and goals as of 20 November 2018

Georgios Doumtsis (Greek: Γεώργιος Δούμτσης; born 4 March 2000) is a Greek professional footballer who plays as a winger for Gamma Ethniki club Pannaxiakos.
