= Stefanos Stroungis =

Greek football player

Personal information
- Date of birth: 9 October 1997 (age 29)
- Place of birth: Volos, Greece
- Height: 1.87 m (6 ft 2 in)
- Position: Centre-back

Team information
- Current team: Kalamata
- Number: 4

Youth career
- –2015: Niki Volos
- 2015–2017: Atromitos

Senior career*
Years	Team	Apps	(Gls)
2017–2023	Atromitos	62	(3)
2023–2024	UTA Arad	1	(0)
2024–	Kalamata	57	(2)

International career
2015	Greece U19	2	(0)
- * Club domestic league appearances and goals as of 20 September 2026

Stefanos Stroungis (Greek: Στέφανος Στρούγγης; born 9 October 1997) is a Greek professional footballer who plays as a centre-back for Super League club Kalamata.
