= Konstantinos Kotsopoulos =

Greek footballer

Kostas Kotsopoulos
Personal information
- Full name: Konstantinos Kotsopoulos
- Date of birth: 21 February 1997 (age 29)
- Place of birth: Veria, Greece
- Height: 1.77 m (5 ft 10 in)
- Position: Forward

Team information
- Current team: Panserraikos
- Number: 97

Youth career
- –2013: AS Nireas Veria
- 2013–2016: Makrochori

Senior career*
| Years | Team | Apps | (Gls) |
| 2016–2018 | Naoussa | 37 | (19) |
| 2018–2023 | Atromitos | 61 | (4) |
| 2019–2020 | → Getafe B (loan) | 17 | (1) |
| 2023 | IFK Mariehamn | 7 | (1) |
| 2024 | Kalamata | 11 | (0) |
| 2024–2025 | Kampaniakos | 25 | (10) |
| 2025–2026 | Kalamata | 23 | (3) |
| 2026– | Panserraikos | 2 | (0) |

International career^{‡}
| 2018 | Greece U21 | 6 | (1) |
- * Club domestic league appearances and goals as of 20 September 2026 ‡ National team caps and goals as of 20 November 2018

Konstantinos 'Kostas' Kotsopoulos (Greek: Κωνσταντίνος 'Κώστας' Κωτσόπουλος; born 21 February 1997) is a Greek professional footballer who plays as a forward for Super League 2 club Panserraikos.

== Career ==
=== Atromitos ===
On 29 January 2018, he signed a 3 1/2-year contract with Super League club Atromitos. On 10 March 2018, he scored his first goal with the club in a 2–2 away draw against Panionios. On 31 October 2018, he scored a hat-trick as he scored with a head beyond the flailing goalkeeper. Two minutes after half time, Kotsopoulos then made it 2–0 for Atromitos, sliding a low cross over the line, and secured his hat trick to complete a resounding 6–1 away Greek Cup win against Iraklis. It was his first hat trick in his career.

After a short stint in Finland with IFK Mariehamn in 2023, Kotsopoulos returned to Greece and signed with Kalamata in January 2024.
