= Georgios Xydas =

Greek footballer

Personal information
- Date of birth: 14 April 1997 (age 29)
- Place of birth: Chios, Greece
- Height: 1.75 m (5 ft 9 in)
- Position: Forward

Team information
- Current team: Poseidon Kardamyli

Youth career
- 2014: AEL Kalloni

Senior career*
Years	Team	Apps	(Gls)
2014–2016	AEL Kalloni	9	(0)
2016–2018	Olympiacos	0	(0)
2017–2018	→ AO Chania−Kissamikos (loan)	26	(10)
2018–2021	PAS Giannina	31	(1)
2021–2022	Olympiacos Volos	18	(5)
2022–2024	Anagennisi Karditsa	26	(3)
2024	Spartakos Kitiou	8	(1)
2025–	Poseidon Kardamyli		

International career^{‡}
2015–2016	Greece U19	4	(1)
- * Club domestic league appearances and goals as of 1 May 2022 ‡ National team caps and goals as of 14 July 2019

Georgios Xydas (Greek: Γεώργιος Ξύδας; born 14 April 1997) is a Greek professional footballer who played as a forward for Poseidon Kardamyli.

== Career ==
Xydas completed a transfer to PAS Giannina on 3 July 2018 by signing a three-year contract.

== Honours ==
PAS Giannina

- Super League Greece 2: 2019–20
