= Vasilios Zogos =

Greek footballer

Personal information
- Date of birth: 29 July 1999 (age 27)
- Place of birth: Athens, Greece
- Height: 1.90 m (6 ft 3 in)
- Position: Centre-back

Team information
- Current team: Teuta
- Number: 3

Youth career
- –2016: Atromitos
- 2015–2016: → Aris Petroupoli (loan)
- 2016–2017: Ifestos Peristeri
- 2017–2018: PAS Giannina

Senior career*
Years	Team	Apps	(Gls)
2017–2020	PAS Giannina	0	(0)
2018–2019	→ Alessandria (loan)	2	(0)
2020	Bylis	2	(0)
2020–2021	Trikala	12	(0)
2022–2023	Michigan Stars	18	(5)
2023	Bylis	11	(0)
2023–2024	Kukësi	32	(2)
2024	Mura	2	(0)
2025–	Teuta	39	(4)
- * Club domestic league appearances and goals as of 13 May 2026

Vasilios Zogos (Greek: Βασίλειος Ζώγκος; Albanian: Vasil Zhongo; born 29 July 1999) is a Greek professional footballer who plays as a centre-back for Teuta.

== Career ==
Zogos started his career in smaller Greek teams, his first professional club was PAS Giannina. On the summer of 2018, he was loaned to Italian third tier Alessandria. He made his professional debut in the Coppa Italia Serie C on 10 October 2018 against Albissola, playing 67 minutes as a member of starting team.

In January 2020, Zogos moved to KF Bylis. However, he returned to Greece in October 2020, signing with Trikala.

On 6 July 2024 it was confirmed that Zogos moved to Slovenian PrvaLiga club NŠ Mura on a deal until June 2026.
