= Kostas Peristeridis =

Greek footballer (born 1991)

Personal information
- Full name: Konstantinos Peristeridis
- Date of birth: 24 January 1991 (age 35)
- Place of birth: Chania, Greece
- Height: 1.95 m (6 ft 5 in)
- Position: Goalkeeper

Team information
- Current team: Ilioupoli
- Number: 25

Youth career
- 2007–2010: FC Volendam

Senior career*
Years	Team	Apps	(Gls)
2010–2012	Almere City	10	(0)
2012–2013	Panionios	17	(0)
2013–2015	Platanias	6	(0)
2015–2020	PAS Giannina	31	(0)
2020–2022	Niki Volos	17	(0)
2022–	Ilioupoli	17	(0)

International career^{‡}
2008	Greece U19	3	(0)
- * Club domestic league appearances and goals as of 16 June 2023 ‡ National team caps and goals as of 22 January 2019

Kostas Peristeridis (Greek: Κώστας Περιστερίδης; born 24 January 1991) is a Greek professional footballer who plays as a goalkeeper for Super League 2 club Ilioupoli.

== Career ==
Born in Chania, Greece, Peristeridis moved to the Netherlands to play football at the age 16. After initially signing with FC Volendam, Peristeridis joined Almere City FC in 2010, making 10 Eerste Divisie appearances in his first season with the club.

Peristeridis has appeared for the Greece national under-21 football team.

== Honours ==
PAS Giannina

- Super League Greece 2: 2019–20
