= Pavlos Grosdanis =

Greek footballer

Personal information
- Date of birth: 3 April 2002 (age 24)
- Place of birth: Florina, Greece
- Height: 1.88 m (6 ft 2 in)
- Position: Midfielder

Team information
- Current team: Kavala
- Number: 47

Youth career
- 2017–2019: PAS Giannina

Senior career*
Years	Team	Apps	(Gls)
2019–2021	PAS Giannina	4	(0)
2022–	Kavala	14	(0)
- * Club domestic league appearances and goals as of 1 May 2022

Pavlos Grosdanis (Greek: Παύλος Γροσδάνης; born 3 April 2002) is a Greek professional footballer who plays as a midfielder for Super League 2 club Kavala.

== Honours ==
PAS Giannina

- Super League Greece 2: 2019–20
