= Danny Bejarano =

Bolivian footballer (born 1994)

Personal information
- Full name: Danny Bryan Bejarano Yañez
- Date of birth: 3 January 1994 (age 32)
- Place of birth: Santa Cruz de la Sierra, Bolivia
- Height: 1.82 m (6 ft 0 in)
- Position: Midfielder

Team information
- Current team: Blooming
- Number: 16

Youth career
- –2011: Oriente Petrolero

Senior career*
Years	Team	Apps	(Gls)
2011–2015	Oriente Petrolero	106	(9)
2015–2018	Panetolikos	36	(0)
2016	→ Club Bolívar (loan)	12	(0)
2016–2017	→ Sport Boys Warnes (loan)	24	(1)
2018	→ Oriente Petrolero (loan)	15	(1)
2019–2023	Lamia	132	(7)
2023–2025	Nea Salamina	58	(2)
2025–2026	Panionios	13	(0)
2026-	Blooming	0	(0)

International career^{‡}
2012–	Bolivia	32	(0)
- * Club domestic league appearances and goals as of 16 January 2026 ‡ National team caps and goals as of 20:29, 25 March 2024 (UTC)

Danny Bryan Bejarano Yañez (born 3 January 1994) is a Bolivian professional footballer who plays as a midfielder for Bolivian First Division club Blooming.

== Club career ==
He started his career playing for Oriente Petrolero in Liga de Fútbol Profesional Boliviano.

On 23 May 2015, the Santa Cruz central midfielder Danny Bejarano migrate into Greek football side playing for Panetolikos signing a three years' contract. "He has the ability to play for the club. Danny had a good season. The player is very happy for this great step in his football career", said team manager Rodrigo Osorio on Bejarano.

On 5 January 2016, Panetolikos announced that Bejarano would be returning to Bolivia for six months to play for Club Bolívar. On 14 July 2016, he signed a long season contract with Sport Boys Warnes on loan from Panetolikos and on 24 July 2018 he signed a six months contract as a loanee with Oriente Petrolero.

On 22 December 2018, he signed a contract with Lamia for an undisclosed fee.

== International career ==
As of 1 May 2016, Bejarano has earned 11 caps for Bolivia and he represented his country in 5 FIFA World Cup qualification matches.
