= Fatjon Andoni =

Greek footballer

Personal information
- Date of birth: 19 June 1991 (age 35)
- Place of birth: Athens, Greece
- Height: 1.85 m (6 ft 1 in)
- Positions: Defensive midfielder; centre back

Team information
- Current team: Marko
- Number: 64

Youth career
- –2009: Ethnikos Asteras

Senior career*
Years	Team	Apps	(Gls)
2009–2012	Ethnikos Asteras	34	(0)
2012–2014	Panachaiki	65	(3)
2014–2015	Lamia	20	(5)
2015–2016	Apollon Smyrnis	26	(3)
2016–2020	AEL	86	(8)
2020–2023	Apollon Smyrnis	82	(12)
2023–2024	Dinamo Tirana	20	(3)
2024	Nea Artaki	14	(8)
2025–	Marko	15	(0)
- * Club domestic league appearances and goals as of 18 January 2026

Fatjon Andoni (born 19 June 1991) is an Albanian professional footballer who plays as a defensive midfielder for Greek Super League 2 club GS Marko.

He has previously played for Abissnet Superiore club FK Dinamo Tirana.
