= Georgios Gogos =

Greek footballer

Personal information
- Full name: Georgios Gogos
- Date of birth: 11 July 2001 (age 25)
- Place of birth: Ioannina, Greece
- Height: 1.93 m (6 ft 4 in)
- Position: Centre-back

Team information
- Current team: Hellas Syros
- Number: 4

Youth career
- 2007–2015: AO Giannina
- 2015–2018: PAS Giannina

Senior career*
Years	Team	Apps	(Gls)
2018–2020	PAS Giannina	1	(0)
2021–2023	Thesprotos	53	(3)
2023–2025	PAEEK	48	(7)
2025–	Hellas Syros	13	(0)

International career^{‡}
2017–2018	Greece U17	7	(1)
2018–2019	Greece U18	5	(0)
- * Club domestic league appearances and goals as of 13 September 2026 ‡ National team caps and goals as of 31 January 2019

Georgios Gogos (Greek: Γεώργιος Γώγος; born 11 July 2001) is a Greek professional footballer who plays as a centre-back for Super League 2 club Hellas Syros.

== Career ==
=== PAS Giannina ===
In February 2018, Gogos signed his first professional contract with PAS Giannina. He made his debut in an away 6–1 win against Apollon Pontus. His contract didn't renewed and he was set free.

== Honours ==
PAS Giannina

- Super League Greece 2: 2019–20
