= Pantelis Panourgias =

Greek footballer

Personal information
- Full name: Panteleimon Panourgias
- Date of birth: 13 April 1998 (age 28)
- Place of birth: Athens, Greece
- Height: 1.90 m (6 ft 3 in)
- Position: Centre-back

Youth career
- 2008–2012: AEK Athens
- 2012–2014: FC Augsburg
- 2014–2016: AEK Athens
- 2016–2018: Eintracht Braunschweig
- 2018–2019: PEC Zwolle

Senior career*
Years	Team	Apps	(Gls)
2017–2018	Eintracht Braunschweig II	44	(1)
2018–2019	PEC Zwolle	0	(0)
2019–2021	PAS Giannina	5	(0)
2021–2022	Episkopi	0	(0)
2022–	Kavala	17	(0)

International career^{‡}
2016–2017	Greece U19	4	(0)
- * Club domestic league appearances and goals as of 1 May 2022 ‡ National team caps and goals as of 9 February 2017

Pantelis Panourgias (Greek: Παντελής Πανουργιάς; born 13 April 1998) is a Greek professional footballer who plays as a centre-back.

== Honours ==
PAS Giannina

- Super League Greece 2: 2019–20

Eintracht Braunschweig U19

- DFB-Junioren-Vereinspokal: 2016–17
