= Angelos Zioulis =

Greek footballer (born 1995)

Personal information
- Date of birth: 1 February 1995 (age 31)
- Place of birth: Athens, Greece
- Height: 1.88 m (6 ft 2 in)
- Position: Centre-back

Team information
- Current team: Panthrakikos
- Number: 20

Youth career
- 2013–2014: Panthrakikos
- 2014–2015: Panathinaikos
- 2015–2016: AEL Limassol

Senior career*
| Years | Team | Apps | (Gls) |
| 2016–2017 | THOI Lakatamia | | |
| 2017–2019 | AO Chania−Kissamikos | 47 | (0) |
| 2019–2020 | PAS Giannina | 4 | (0) |
| 2021–2023 | Chania | 31 | (1) |
| 2023 | Ilioupoli | 10 | (0) |
| 2023–2026 | Egaleo | 76 | (1) |
| 2026– | Panthrakikos | 0 | (0) |
- * Club domestic league appearances and goals as of 21 April 2026

Angelos Zioulis (Greek: Άγγελος Ζιούλης; born 1 February 1995) is a Greek professional footballer who plays as a centre-back for Super League 2 club Panthrakikos.

== Honours ==
PAS Giannina

- Super League 2: 2019–20
