= Antonis Ikonomopoulos =

Greek footballer

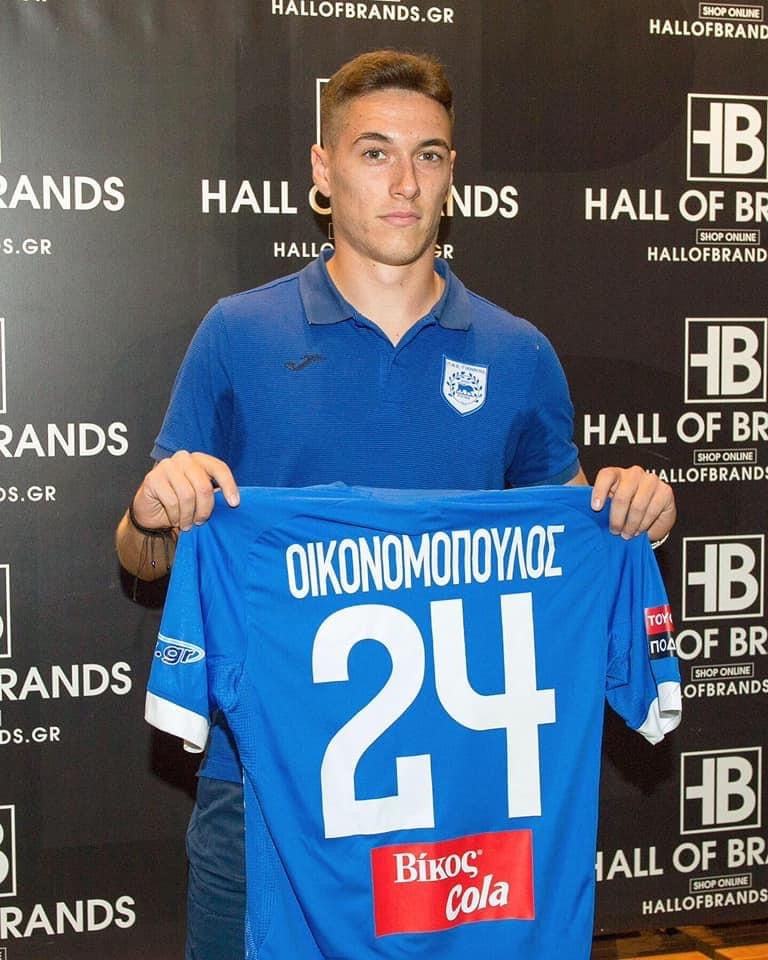

Personal information
- Full name: Antonios Ikonomopoulos
- Date of birth: 9 May 1998 (age 28)
- Place of birth: Athens, Greece
- Height: 1.79 m (5 ft 10 in)
- Position: Right-back

Team information
- Current team: Slovan Kendice

Youth career
- 2008–2018: Panathinaikos

Senior career*
Years	Team	Apps	(Gls)
2018–2019	Panathinaikos	0	(0)
2018	→ Sparta (loan)	0	(0)
2019	Apollon Smyrnis	3	(0)
2019–2022	PAS Giannina	30	(0)
2022–2023	Volos	5	(0)
2023–2024	Pierikos	0	(0)
2024	Ionikos	10	(0)
2024–2025	Niki Volos	8	(0)
2025–	Slovan Kendice	0	(0)

International career^{‡}
2014	Greece U17	3	(0)
- * Club domestic league appearances and goals as of 15 June 2025 ‡ National team caps and goals as of 30 September 2014

Antonis Ikonomopoulos (Greek: Αντώνης Οικονομόπουλος; born 9 May 1998) is a Greek professional footballer who plays as a right-back for Slovak club Slovan Kendice.

== Honours ==
PAS Giannina

- Super League Greece 2: 2019–20
