= Lefteris Choutesiotis =

Greek professional footballer

Personal information
- Full name: Eleftherios Choutesiotis
- Date of birth: 20 July 1994 (age 32)
- Place of birth: Makrychori, Thessaly, Greece
- Height: 1.92 m (6 ft 4 in)
- Position: Goalkeeper

Team information
- Current team: Atromitos
- Number: 1

Youth career
- 2012–2014: Olympiacos

Senior career*
Years	Team	Apps	(Gls)
2014–2019	Olympiacos	3	(0)
2019–2021	PAS Giannina	37	(0)
2021–2023	Ionikos	64	(0)
2023–2024	Aris	5	(0)
2024–	Atromitos	53	(0)

International career^{‡}
2014	Greece U21	5	(0)
- * Club domestic league appearances and goals as of 19 September 2026 ‡ National team caps and goals as of 29 April 2018

Lefteris Choutesiotis (Greek: Λευτέρης Χουτεσιώτης; born 20 July 1994) is a Greek professional footballer who plays as a goalkeeper for Super League club Atromitos.

== Career ==
=== Olympiacos ===
Choutesiotis promoted to the first team of Olympiacos and became a pro during January 2014. He made his debut in Super League Greece in a 4–0 home victory against Panthrakikos on 3 April 2016. On 18 May 2018, Choutesiotis signed a two-year extension of his contract.

=== PAS Giannina ===
On 9 September 2019, Choutesiotis signed a contract with PAS Giannina the main club in the city of Ioannina. With the club of Ioannina he won the Football League: 2019–20 and got promoted to the Super League.

=== Ionikos ===
On 5 July 2021, Choutesiotis signed a contract with Ionikos on a free transfer. On 11 June 2022, he signed a new two-year contract.

=== Aris ===
On 20 June 2023, Choutesiotis joined Aris on a free transfer.

== Career statistics ==
As of 23 June 2023

Appearances and goals by club, season and competition
Club	Season	League			Cup		Continental		Other		Total	
Club	Season	Division	Apps	Goals	Apps	Goals	Apps	Goals	Apps	Goals	Apps	Goals
Olympiacos	2014–15	Super League Greece	0	0	0	0	—		—		0	0
Olympiacos	2015–16	Super League Greece	1	0	0	0	—		—		1	0
Olympiacos	2016–17	Super League Greece	0	0	2	0	—		—		2	0
Olympiacos	2017–18	Super League Greece	2	0	2	0	0	0	—		4	0
Olympiacos	2018–19	Super League Greece	0	0	2	0	0	0	—		2	0
Olympiacos	Total		3	0	6	0	0	0	—		9	0
PAS Giannina	2019–20	Super League Greece 2	17	0	2	0	—		—		19	0
PAS Giannina	2020–21	Super League Greece	20	0	1	0	—		—		21	0
PAS Giannina	Total		37	0	3	0	—		—		40	0
Ionikos	2021–22	Super League Greece	31	0	1	0	—		—		32	0
Ionikos	2022–23	Super League Greece	33	0	0	0	—		—		33	0
Ionikos	Total		64	0	1	0	—		—		65	0
Career total			104	0	9	0	0	0	0	0	114	0

== Honours ==
Olympiacos

- Super League Greece: 2013–14, 2014–15, 2015–16, 2016–17
- Greek Cup: 2014–15

PAS Giannina

- Super League Greece 2: 2019–20
