= Zosimades Stadium =

Multi-purpose stadium in Ioannina, Greece

National Stadium of Ioannina
- Zosimades
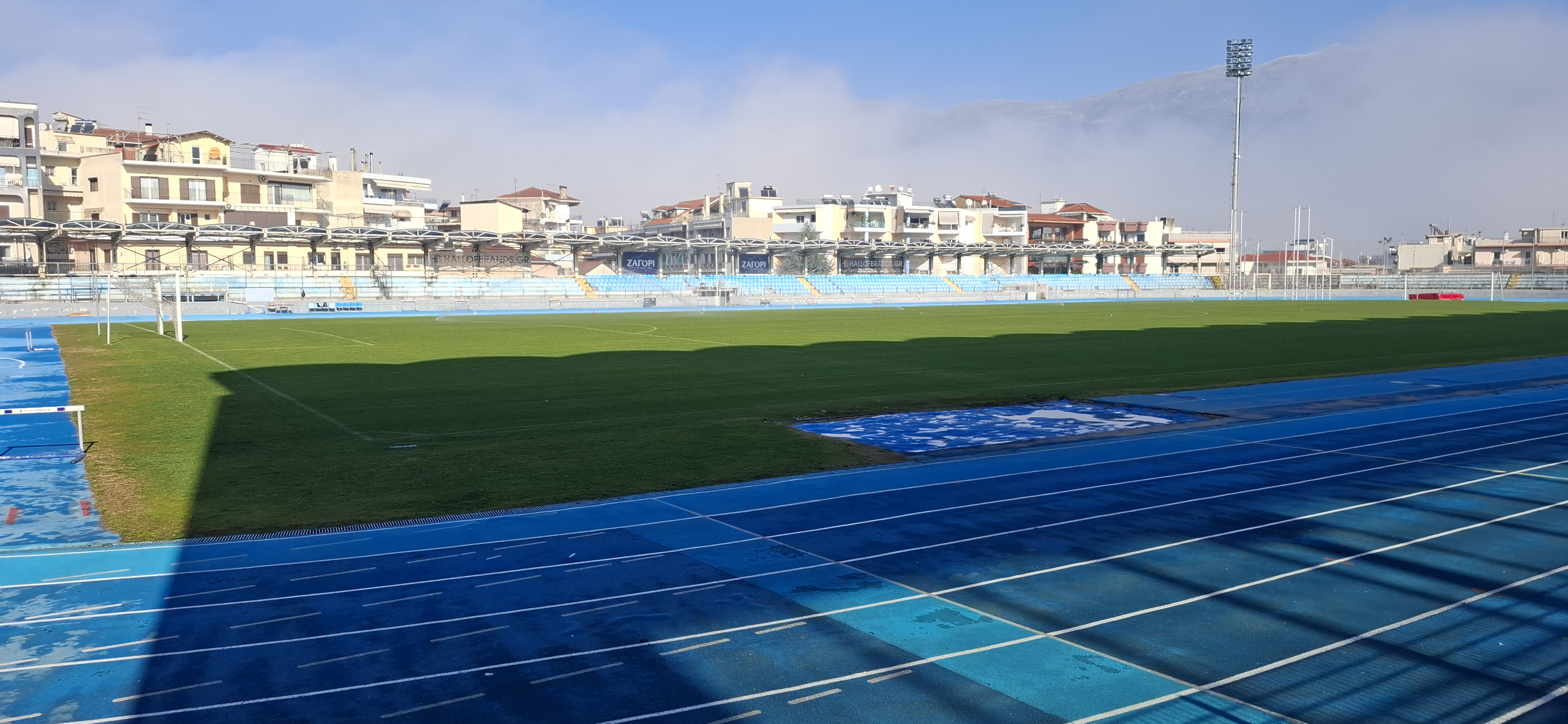
- Interactive map of National Stadium of Ioannina
- Location: Ioannina, Greece
- Owner: General Secretariat of Sports
- Operator: PAS Giannina
- Capacity: 7,652
- Record attendance: 14,557 (1975, PAS Giannina vs. Olympiacos)
- Acreage: 23,000 m^{2}
- Surface: Grass
- Scoreboard: Yes

Construction
- Built: 1952

Tenants
- PAS Giannina AO Velisariou AE Giannena: 1966– 1992–1996; 2005–2007

Website
- PEAKI.gr

The National Stadium of Ioannina (Greek: Εθνικό Στάδιο Ιωαννίνων), more commonly known as Zosimades Stadium (Greek: Στάδιο "Ζωσιμάδες") is a multi-purpose stadium based on Ioannina, Greece and named after the 18th-century Zosimades brothers, benefactors of the city. It is currently used mostly for football matches and is the home of PAS Giannina. The rock band Scorpions held a concert in the Zosimades Stadium in 2010.

== History ==
In 1934, at the suggestion of the surgeon-doctor Periklis Yannis and the tireless and pious efforts of the then Metropolitan of Ioannina and later Archbishop of Athens and all Greece Spyridon (Vlachos), the sports facilities were moved to the place where the National Stage of Zosimades "Of course, it might have been used before, about the end of 1932 to the beginning of 1933. In that area, there was an extensive area known as the "Hoja Field", which apparently once belonged to a Hoxha, but which was small to meet the needs of a permanent stadium in the city. Then Metropolitan Spyridon himself visited the area surrounded by poor little houses that had small gardens and little fields. With fiery patriotic words he persuaded the inhabitants of this land, to give up some of their properties to create the foreseen land and eventually to build a decent stage where the youth would train. So the first decent stage was created in the city. The space is bought in part over a period of 20 years. Its original form is completely different. The changing rooms were in the courtyards next to the houses, namely in the courtyard of Mrs. Kostena.

The foundation stone of the new stadium was set on October 18, 1936. The ceremony was attended by the government, local and ecclesiastical authorities. Also at the ceremony were students from the schools and schools of the city but also a crowd of people.

His first administration, on 4 September 1945, gave him the name Zosimades, in honor of the Zosimades brothers.

In the beginning the Metropolis provided enough money to fencing the new stadium by building a huge stone wall around it. A little later, around 1959 to 1960, the Metropolis built, on the north side of the stadium, a capacity of about five hundred spectators, with the ultimate goal of securing ownership of the stadium, as there was nothing to prove its ownership. This regime lasted until the Duchy of the Colonels, so on a visit by the then Secretary-General of Sports Konstantinos Aslanidis who, seeing this enormous space in the middle of the city, was positively impressed and asked for a study to be made as soon as possible built a decent stage worthy of the historic city of Ioannina. As a matter of course, it was a matter of ownership of the stadium, because it was not possible to disburse money from the General Secretariat of Sports and the owner was the Metropolis. Eventually it was bought by the state and so it finally ended the issue.

In 1965, a preliminary study of electrification of the stadium by Siemens was made. In 1966 the athletics track would be entered while the study also provided a swimming pool. In 1993 strong winds destroyed the then sheltered platform, opposite the large enclosure.

In 2000 the headlamps were placed and the seats were replaced. The stadium has 8 headlights (2 in each corner) until the four headlamps have been transported to Rizoupoli. In the summer of 2007 the turf was changed. In 2009, the old roof was rebuilt, 16 years after the disaster. In July and August 2010, the turf was changed again, as well as some piping work. The slope of the stadium fell more (from 71 cm to 41), which is in line with the UEFA standards. In September of the same year, tourniquets were placed at the entrances. In the summer of 2016 the stadium hosted a match in the second qualifying round of the Europa League 2016-17 after some works that were made (mainly the growth of the field). In its present form, however, it can not host competitions from the third qualifying round then. In the summer of 2017, drainage works and turf change were made once again within a few years.

== Other uses ==
=== Concerts ===
On 5 July 2010, a concert was held by the rock band Scorpions.

Date	Concert	Tour	Attendance	Notes:
5 July 2010	Scorpions	Get Your Sting and Blackout World Tour		
19 July 2013	Paschalis Terzis			
