= Alexandros Kartalis =

Greek footballer

Personal information
- Date of birth: 29 January 1995 (age 31)
- Place of birth: Nuremberg, Germany
- Height: 1.80 m (5 ft 11 in)
- Position: Winger

Team information
- Current team: Kavala
- Number: 77

Youth career
- 2001–2004: SG Nürnberg Fürth
- 2004–2014: Greuther Fürth

Senior career*
Years	Team	Apps	(Gls)
2014–2018	Greuther Fürth II	50	(4)
2015–2017	→ Aalen (loan)	53	(4)
2018–2019	Zwickau	25	(0)
2019–2021	PAS Giannina	41	(2)
2021–2022	Atromitos	16	(0)
2023	Volos	16	(0)
2024–2026	Makedonikos	32	(1)
2026–	Kavala	3	(0)
- * Club domestic league appearances and goals as of 2 April 2026 2026

Alexandros Kartalis (Greek: Αλέξανδρος Καρτάλης; born 29 January 1995) is a Greek professional footballer who plays as a winger for Super League 2 club Kavala.

== Career ==
On 5 July 2019, he joined PAS Giannina.

On 14 June 2021, he joined Atromitos.

On 12 December 2022, he signed a contract with Volos on a free transfer.

== Career statistics ==
As of 2 April 2026

Club	Season	League			Cup		Continental		Other		Total	
Club	Season	Division	Apps	Goals	Apps	Goals	Apps	Goals	Apps	Goals	Apps	Goals
Greuther Fürth II	2014–15	Regionalliga Bayern	22	1	0	0	—		0	0	22	1
Greuther Fürth II	2017–18	Regionalliga Bayern	28	3	0	0	—		0	0	28	3
Greuther Fürth II	Total		50	4	0	0	—		—		50	4
Aalen (loan)	2015–16	3. Liga	25	1	1	0	—		1	0	27	1
Aalen (loan)	2016–17	3. Liga	28	3	0	0	—		3	0	31	3
Aalen (loan)	Total		53	4	1	0	—		4	0	58	4
Zwickau	2018–19	3. Liga	25	0	0	0	—		3	0	28	0
PAS Giannina	2019–20	Superleague Greece 2	12	2	4	0	—		—		16	2
PAS Giannina	2020–21	Superleague Greece	29	0	6	1	—		—		35	1
PAS Giannina	Total		41	2	10	1	—		—		51	3
Atromitos	2021–22	Superleague Greece	16	0	1	0	—		—		17	0
Volos	2022–23	Superleague Greece	16	0	1	0	—		—		17	0
Makedonikos	2024–25	Superleague Greece 2	16	0	2	0	—		—		18	0
Makedonikos	2025–26	Superleague Greece 2	16	1	0	0	—		—		16	1
Makedonikos	Total		32	1	2	0	—		—		34	1
Niki Volos	2025–26	Superleague Greece 2	3	0	0	0	—		—		3	0
Career total			236	11	15	1	0	0	7	0	258	12

== Honours ==
PAS Giannina

- Super League Greece 2: 2019–20
