= Christos Eleftheriadis =

Greek footballer (born 1991)

Personal information
- Date of birth: 30 September 1991 (age 35)
- Place of birth: Kavala, Greece
- Height: 1.73 m (5 ft 8 in)
- Position: Winger

Team information
- Current team: Naoussa

Youth career
- –2010: Almopos Aridea

Senior career*
| Years | Team | Apps | (Gls) |
| 2010–2011 | Kavala | 2 | (0) |
| 2011–2014 | Pierikos | 60 | (7) |
| 2014–2015 | Almopos Aridea | | |
| 2015 | Ethnikos Gazorou | 10 | (0) |
| 2015–2016 | Niki Volos | | |
| 2016–2019 | Panachaiki | 51 | (20) |
| 2019–2021 | PAS Giannina | 35 | (6) |
| 2021–2022 | Lamia | 19 | (2) |
| 2022–2023 | Ionikos | 24 | (2) |
| 2023–2024 | Chania | 19 | (4) |
| 2024–2025 | Panachaiki | 15 | (1) |
| 2025–2026 | Aias Salamina | | |
| 2026 | Kampaniakos | 5 | (1) |
| 2026– | Naoussa | | |
- * Club domestic league appearances and goals as of 20 April 2026

Christos Eleftheriadis (Greek: Χρήστος Ελευθεριάδης; born 30 September 1991) is a Greek professional footballer who plays as a winger for Gamma Ethniki club Naoussa.

== Honours ==
PAS Giannina

- Super League Greece 2: 2019–20
