= 2018–19 PAS Giannina F.C. season =

PAS Giannina
2018–19 season
- Chairman: Giorgos Christovasilis
- Manager: Giannis Petrakis
- Stadium: Zosimades Stadium, Ioannina
- Super League: 14
- Greek Cup: Round of 16, eliminated by Panionios
- Top goalscorer: League: Sandi Križman (4); All: Sandi Križman (6)
- Highest home attendance: 3630; Olympiacos
- Lowest home attendance: 2058; Levadiakos
- Average home league attendance: 2677
Home colours	Away colours	Third colours

The 2018–19 season is PAS Giannina F.C.'s 24th competitive season in the top flight of Greek football, 9th season in the Super League Greece, and 53rd year in existence as a football club. They also compete in the Greek Cup.

== Players ==
updated 26 February 2019

No.	Name	Nationality	Position(s)	Place of birth	Date of birth (Age)	Signed from	Notes
Goalkeepers
12	Kostas Peristeridis	(Greece)	GK	Chania, Crete, Greece	24 January 1991 (27)	(Greece) Platanias	
16	Thodoris Venetikidis	(Greece)	GK	Veria, Greece	20 February 2001 (17)	(Greece) Veria	
30	Giorgos Papaioannou	(Greece)	GK	Ioannina, Greece	30 June 1998 (20)	(Greece) PAS Giannina U20	
39	Markos Vellidis	(Greece)	GK	Kastoria, Greece	4 April 1987 (31)	Free	
93	Neofytos Michael	(Cyprus)	GK	Nicosia, Cyprus	16 December 1993 (24)	(Cyprus) APOEL	Loan
Defenders
2	Michalis Boukouvalas	(Greece)	RB	Agrinio, Greece	14 January 1988 (30)	(Greece) Iraklis	
4	Stefanos Evangelou	(Greece)	CB	Athens, Greece	12 May 1998 (19)	(Greece) Olympiacos	Loan
5	Giorgos Gogos	(Greece)	CB	Ioannina, Greece	11 July 2001 (17)	(Greece) PAS Giannina U20	
6	Alexios Michail (C)	(Greece)	CB	Ioannina, Greece	18 August 1986 (31)	(Greece) Panserraikos	
8	Themistoklis Tzimopoulos (VC)	(New Zealand) (Greece)	CB	Kozani, Greece	20 November 1985 (32)	(Greece) Ethnikos Asteras	
17	Lasha Shergelashvili	(Georgia (country))	LB	Tbilisi, Georgia	17 January 1992 (27)	(Latvia) RFS	
19	Giannis Kargas	(Greece)	CB	Kilkis, Greece	9 December 1994 (24)	(Belarus) Dinamo Brest	
44	Apostolos Skondras	(Greece)	CB	Athens, Greece	29 December 1988 (29)	(Greece) AEL	
77	Alexis Apostolopoulos	(Greece)	RB	Zakynthos, Greece	7 November 1991 (26)	(Greece) Platanias	
Midfielders
3	Andi Lila (VC2)	(Albania)	DM	Kavajë, Albania	12 February 1986 (32)	(Albania) KF Tirana	
7	Evripidis Giakos	(Greece)	CM / CF	Ioannina, Greece	9 April 1991 (27)	(Greece) Doxa Kranoula	
20	Konstantinos Papadopoulos	(Greece)	CM	Ioannina, Greece	8 August 2000 (18)	(Greece) PAS Giannina U20	
21	Fabry Castro	(Colombia)	MF	Santa Bárbara, Colombia	21 February 1992 (26)	(Switzerland) Servette FC	
22	Stefanos Siontis	(Greece)	CM	Ioannina, Greece	4 September 1987 (30)	(Greece) Kassiopi	
28	Giorgos Xydas	(Greece)	MF	Chios, Greece	14 April 1997 (21)	(Greece) Kissamikos	
35	Dušan Pantelić	(Serbia)	MF	Kragujevac, FR Yugoslavia	15 April 1993 (25)	(Serbia) Radnik Surdulica	
80	Angelos Liasos	(Greece)	CM	Florina, Greece	26 May 2000 (18)	(Greece) PAS Giannina U20	
88	Alexandros Nikolias	(Greece)	CM / RLW	Kymi, Euboea, Greece	23 July 1994 (24)	(Greece) Olympiacos Volos	
99	Vladyslav Naumets	(Ukraine)	MF	Luhansk, Ukraine	7 March 1999 (19)	Free	
Forwards
9	Stefanos Athanasiadis	(Greece)	FW	Lakkoma, Greece	24 December 1988 (29)	(Israel) Maccabi Haifa	
10	Sandi Križman	(Croatia)	FW	Pula, SR Croatia, SFR Yugoslavia	17 August 1989 (28)	(Greece) AEL	
14	Georgios Pamlidis	(Greece)	FW	Katerini, Greece	13 November 1993 (24)	(Greece) Kassiopi	
23	Stavros Pilios	(Greece)	FW	Ioannina, Greece	10 December 2000 (18)	(Greece) PAS Giannina U19	
27	Dimitrios Manos	(Greece)	FW	Trikala, Imathia, Greece	16 September 1994 (24)	(Greece) Olympiacos	Loan
29	Jean-Baptiste Léo	(France)	FW	Lyon, France	3 May 1996 (22)	(Greece) Kissamikos	
33	Higor Vidal	(Brazil)	CF / RW / CM	Campo Largo, Paraná, Brazil	26 September 1996 (21)	(Brazil) Londrina Esporte Clube	
55	Enes Dolovac	(Serbia)	CF / RLW	Novi Pazar, Serbia	1 February 1999 (19)	(Serbia) Novi Pazar Academy	
Left during Winter Transfer Window
15	Alex Kakuba	(Uganda)	LB	Kampala, Uganda	12 June 1991 (27)	(Portugal) C.D. Feirense	
27	Giannis Mystakidis	(Greece)	CF / W	Thessaloniki, Greece	7 December 1994 (23)	(Greece) PAOK	
17	Orest Kuzyk	(Ukraine)	MF	Lviv, Ukraine	17 May 1995 (23)	(Ukraine) Stal Kamianske	Loan
25	Giannis Loukinas	(Greece)	FW	Athens, Greece	20 September 1991 (26)	(Greece) Karaiskakis	
11	Mite Cikarski	(North Macedonia)	LB	Strumica, North Macedonia	6 January 1993 (25)	(Cyprus) Ethnikos Achna	

=== International players ===
- (Albania) Andi Lila
- (Greece) Michalis Boukouvalas
- (Greece) Markos Vellidis
- (Greece) Kostas Peristeridis (Men's & U19)
- (Greece) Stefanos Athanasiadis (Men's & U21/19)
- (New Zealand) Themistoklis Tzimopoulos
- (North Macedonia) Mite Cikarski
- (Uganda) Alex Kakuba
- (Cyprus) Neofytos Michael
- (Georgia (country)) Lasha Shergelashvili
- (Greece) Alexis Apostolopoulos (U21 & U19)
- (Greece) Giannis Mystakidis (U-21 & U-19)
- (Greece) Stefanos Evangelou (U-21/19/17/16)
- (Ukraine) Orest Kuzyk (U-21/20/17/16)
- (Croatia) Sandi Križman (U-21/20/19/18)
- (Greece) Dimitrios Manos (U-21)
- (Greece) Stefanos Siontis (U-19)
- (Greece) Giannis Loukinas (U-19)
- (Greece) Giorgos Xydas (U-19)
- (Ukraine) Vladyslav Naumets (U-19/18/17)
- (Greece) Giorgos Gogos (U-17)
- (Serbia) Enes Dolovac (U-17)

=== Foreign players ===
EU Nationals
- (Croatia) (Europe) Sandi Križman
- (Cyprus) (Europe) Neofytos Michael

EU Nationals (Dual Citizenship)
- (New Zealand) (Greece) (Europe) Themistoklis Tzimopoulos

Non-EU Nationals
- (Albania) Andi Lila
- (Serbia) Enes Dolovac
- (Brazil) Higor Vidal
- (North Macedonia) Mite Cikarski
- (Ukraine) Orest Kuzyk
- (Colombia) Fabry Castro
- (Uganda) Alex Kakuba
- (Ukraine) Vladyslav Naumets
- (Georgia (country)) Lasha Shergelashvili
- (Serbia) Dušan Pantelić

== Personnel ==
=== Management ===
Position	Staff
Majority Owner	Giorgos Christovasilis
President and CEO	Giorgos Christovasilis
Director of Football	Dimitris Niarchakos
Director of Office	Alekos Potsis
Head of Ticket Department	Andreas Potsis

=== Coaching staff ===
Position	Name
Head Coach	Giannis Petrakis
Assistant Coach	Giannis Taousianis
Fitness Coach	Vasilis Alexiou
Goalkeepers Coach	Giannis Plavoukos

=== medical staff ===
Position	Name
Head doctor	Stavros Restanis
Physio	Filippos Skordos

=== Academy ===
Position	Name
Head of Youth Development	Dimitrios Terezopoulos
Head Coach U-19	Marios Panagiotou
Head Coach U-17	Nikos Badimas
Head Coach U-15	Michalis Bolos

== Transfers ==
=== Summer ===
==== In ====
No	Pos	Player	Transferred from	Fee	Date	Source
22	MF	Stefanos Siontis	Kassiopi	-	13 May 2018	
14	FW	Georgios Pamlidis	Kassiopi	-	14 May 2018	
25	FW	Giannis Loukinas	Karaiskakis	-	16 May 2018	
29	FW	Jean-Baptiste Léo	Kissamikos	-	22 May 2018	
17	MF	Orest Kuzyk	Stal Kamianske	-	9 June 2018	
21	MF	Fabry Castro	Servette FC	-	27 June 2018	
15	LB	Alex Kakuba	C.D. Feirense	-	2 July 2018	
28	MF	Giorgos Xydas	Kissamikos	-	3 July 2018	
10	FW	Sandi Križman	AEL	-	26 July 2018	
30	GK	Giorgos Papaioannou	PAS Giannina U-20	-	10 August 2018	
93	GK	Neofytos Michael	APOEL	Loan	17 August 2018	
27	CF / W	Giannis Mystakidis	PAOK	Loan	20 August 2018	
4	CB	Stefanos Evangelou	Olympiacos	Loan	13 August 2018	
9	FW	Stefanos Athanasiadis	Maccabi Haifa	-	7 September 2018	
99	MF	Vladyslav Naumets	-	-	10 September 2018	

==== Out ====
No	Pos	Player	Transferred to	Fee	Date	Source
27	RW	Giorgos Manthatis	Olympiakos	End of loan	14 May 2018	
20	RB	Nikos Karanikas	AEL	-	16 May 2018	
21	DM / CM	Iraklis Garoufalias	Atromitos	-	6 June 2018	
14	CF	Philip Hellquist	Brommapojkarna	-	10 June 2018	
23	CM	Lampros Zacharos	-	-	14 June 2018	
26	CB	Vasilis Zogos	Alessandria	Loan	18 June 2018	
40	GK	Serafeim Giannikoglou	ΑΕΚ	-	26 June 2018	
4	CB	Thodoris Berios	Kisvarda	-	29 June 2018	
10	CF	Bruno Chalkiadakis	Hermannstadt	-	30 June 2018	
17	W / CF	Karim Soltani	-	-	30 June 2018	
64	CF / RLW	Franck Betra	-	-	20 August 2018	
9	CF	Pedro Pérez Conde	Baniyas	800.000	27 August 2018	

For recent transfers, see List of Greek football transfers summer 2018

=== Winter ===
==== In ====
No	Pos	Player	Transferred from	Fee	Date	Source
27	FW	Dimitrios Manos	Olympiacos	Loan	16 January 2019	
17	LB	Lasha Shergelashvili	RFS	-	18 January 2019	
23	FW	Stavros Pilios	PAS Giannina U-19	-	18 January 2019	
35	MF	Dušan Pantelić	Radnik Surdulica	-	20 January 2019	
19	CB	Giannis Kargas	Dinamo Brest	-	12 February 2019	

==== Out ====
No	Pos	Player	Transferred to	Fee	Date	Source
15	LB	Alex Kakuba	Free	-	10 December 2018	
27	CF / W	Giannis Mystakidis	PAOK	Loan termination	4 January 2019	
17	MF	Orest Kuzyk	SC Dnipro-1	Loan	14 January 2019	
25	FW	Giannis Loukinas	Free	-	25 January 2019	
11	LB	Mite Cikarski	Free	-	22 February 2019	

For recent transfers, see List of Greek football transfers winter 2018–19

== Pre-season and friendlies ==
Win Draw Loss Upcoming fixture

17 July 2018 Friendly	PAS Giannina	1–0	AEL	Karpenisi
18:30	Nikolias 8'	Report		Stadium: Athletic center of Karpenisi; Attendance: unknown Referee: unknown

20 July 2018 Friendly	PAS Giannina	2–2	Lamia	Karpenisi
17:15	Higor Vidal 51'; Conde 67'	Report	Vasilantonopoulos 14'; Asigba 95'	Stadium: Athletic center of Karpenisi; Attendance: unknown Referee: Giannis Kalyvas

26 July 2018 Friendly	PAS Giannina	1–0	Levadiakos	Karpenisi
17:15	Conde 28'	Report		Stadium: Athletic center of Karpenisi; Attendance: unknown Referee: Dimitris Kourlos

4 August 2018 Friendly	PAS Giannina	0–1	Panetolikos	Ioannina
18:30		Report	Díaz 35'	Stadium: PEAKI; Attendance: unknown Referee: Giorgos Tasis

8 August 2018 Friendly	Panetolikos	2–1	PAS Giannina	Agrinio
19:30	Barbosa 46'; Vakrakos 69'	Report	Liasos 81'	Stadium: Panetolikos Stadium; Attendance: unknown Referee: Aristomenis Kotsiaftis

12 August 2018 Friendly	PAS Giannina	1-1	Trikala	Ioannina
18:45	Conde 33'	Report	Michail 25' (o.g.)	Stadium: PEAKI; Attendance: unknown Referee: Alexandros Katsikogiannis
Note: The matches was part of 45 minutes games.

12 August 2018 Friendly	PAS Giannina	1-2	Panachaiki	Ioannina
19:45	Conde 28'	Report	Mavrias 5'; Coll 14'	Stadium: PEAKI; Attendance: unknown Referee: Spyros Zampalas
Note: The matches was part of 45 minutes games.

18 August 2018 Friendly	Aris Thessaloniki	0-0	PAS Giannina	Thessaloniki
18:00		Report		Stadium: Kaftanzoglio Stadium; Attendance: unknown Referee: Angelos Aggelakis

7 September 2018 Friendly	PAS Giannina	4-0	Karaiskakis	Ioannina
18:00	Tzimopoulos 3'; Giakos 51'; Loukinas 63'; Xydas 68'	Report		Stadium: Zosimades Stadium; Attendance: unknown Referee: Alexandros Katsikogiannis

11 October 2018 Friendly	PAS Giannina	2-2	Kassiopi	Ioannina
17:00	Pamlidis 68'; Papadopoulos 78'	Report	Thuram 13', 22'	Stadium: Zosimades Stadium; Attendance: unknown Referee: Alexandros Katsikogiannis

== Competitions ==
=== League table ===
Pos	Team	Pld	W	D	L	GF	GA	GD	Pts	Qualification or relegation
12	Xanthi	30	7	11	12	22	34	−12	32 (Note: Head-to-head points: Xanthi 4, OFI 1.)	
13	OFI (O)	30	7	11	12	30	42	−12	32	Qualification for the relegation play-offs
14	PAS Giannina (R)	30	7	6	17	19	38	−19	27	Relegation to Super League 2
15	Levadiakos (R)	30	5	6	19	15	45	−30	21	Relegation to Super League 2
16	Apollon Smyrnis (R)	30	2	4	24	11	55	−44	10	Relegation to Super League 2

Source: Super League Greece
Rules for classification: 1) Points; 2) Head-to-head points; 3) Head-to-head goal difference; 4) Goal difference; 5) Goals scored; 6) Goals against 7) Play-offs (neutral ground); 8) Draw.
(Note: Criteria 7 is only used if needed to decide champion, teams for relegation or teams for UEFA competitions).
(O) Play-off winners; (R) Relegated

==== Results summary ====
Overall								Home						Away					
Pld	W	D	L	GF	GA	GD	Pts	W	D	L	GF	GA	GD	W	D	L	GF	GA	GD
30	7	6	17	19	38	−19	27	5	5	5	10	14	−4	2	1	12	9	24	−15

==== Fixtures ====
Win Draw Loss Upcoming fixture

25 August 2018 1	AEK Athens	2-0	PAS Giannina	Marousi
21:30	Ponce (yellow card) 24'; Ponce 37'; Livaja 47'; Klonaridis (yellow card) 81'	Report	Lila (yellow card) 15'; Tzimopoulos (yellow card) 76'; Križman (yellow card) 79'; Nikolias (yellow card) 90+2'	Stadium: Olympic Stadium; Attendance: 7504; Referee: Athanasios Sezos

2 September 2018 2	Olympiacos	5-0	PAS Giannina	Piraeus
21:30	Elabdellaoui 33'; Fortounis 41' (pen.); Tsimikas (yellow card) 45+1'; Podence 55'; Guerrero 90'; Meriah 90+2'	Report	Xydas (yellow card) 19'; Lila (yellow card) 67'; Tzimopoulos (yellow card) 85'; Fabry Castro (yellow card) 90+2'	Stadium: Karaiskakis Stadium; Attendance: 19678; Referee: Fotios Fotiadis

15 September 2018 3	Apollon Smyrnis	1-2	PAS Giannina	Athens
19:00	D'Urso (yellow card) 14'; Nadales (yellow card) 34'; El-Helwe 79'; Shikabala (yellow card) 89'	Report	Cikarski (yellow card) 25'; Léo 41'; Fabry Castro (yellow card) 45' (yellow-red card) 84'; Nikolias 60'; Nikolias (yellow card) 82'; Vellidis (yellow card) 88'	Stadium: Georgios Kamaras; Attendance: 837; Referee: Georgios Lamprou

22 September 2018 4	PAS Giannina	1-0	Aris Thessaloniki	Ioannina
20:30	Vellidis (yellow card) 33'; Delizisis 65' (o.g.); Skondras (yellow card) 71'	Report	Bruno Gama (yellow card) 24'	Stadium: Zosimades Stadium; Attendance: 2924; Referee: Evangelos Gratsanis

29 September 2018 5	Panathinaikos	2-1	PAS Giannina	Marousi
19:00	Chatzigiovannis 43'; Macheda 59'; Kourbelis (yellow card) 69'	Report	Križman 23'; Križman (yellow card) 61'	Stadium: Olympic Stadium; Attendance: 3810; Referee: Athanasios Tzilos

7 October 2018 6	Atromitos	1-0	PAS Giannina	Peristeri, Athens
19:00	Koulouris 38'; Koulouris (yellow card) 66'; Mujakic (yellow card) 80'	Report	Mystakidis (yellow card) 31'; Higor Vidal (yellow card) 35'; Vellidis (yellow card) 38'; Tzimopoulos (yellow card) 60'; Skondras (yellow card) 66'; Nikolias (yellow card) 79'	Stadium: Peristeri Stadium; Attendance: 631; Referee: Konstantinos Kotsanis

20 October 2018 7	PAS Giannina	0-2	Panetolikos	Ioannina
18:15	Apostolopoulos (yellow card) 67'; Athanasiadis (yellow card) 80'; Lila (yellow card) 87'; Giakos (yellow card) 90+4'	Report	Mazurek 43', 90+6'; Rocha (yellow card) 75'; Malis (yellow card) 81'; Chantakias (yellow card) 89'	Stadium: Zosimades Stadium; Attendance: 2306; Referee: Vasilis Fotias

29 October 2018 8	Xanthi	2-1	PAS Giannina	Xanthi
19:00	Lisgaras (yellow card) 32'; Brito 64'; Jendrišek 77'; Sylla (yellow card) 86'; Đuričković (yellow card) 88' (yellow-red card) 90+2'	Report	Mystakidis 21'; Siontis (yellow card) 49'; Athanasiadis (yellow card) 63'; Michail (yellow card) 66' (yellow-red card) 90+5'; Giakos (yellow card) 90+4'	Stadium: Xanthi FC Arena; Attendance: 965; Referee: Evagelos Manouchos

4 November 2018 9	PAS Giannina	0-0	Lamia	Ioannina
17:15	Siontis (yellow card) 8'; Athanasiadis (yellow card) 38'	Report	Šaranov (yellow card) 60'; Barrales (yellow card) 62'; Pliatsikas (yellow card) 83'; Dimoutsos (yellow card) 90+6'	Stadium: Zosimades Stadium; Attendance: 2772; Referee: Aristotelis Diamantopoulos

10 November 2018 10	AEL	2-0	PAS Giannina	Larissa
17:15	Nunić (yellow card) 41'; Žižić (yellow card) 45+1'; Golias 50'; Deletić 76'	Report	Cikarski (yellow card) 26' (yellow-red card) 48'; Enes Dolovac (yellow card) 44'; Vellidis (yellow card) 56'; Siontis (yellow card) 69'; Lila (yellow card) 80'	Stadium: AEL FC Arena; Attendance: 2160; Referee: Praxitelis Zachariadis

25 November 2018 11	PAS Giannina	2-0	Levadiakos	Ioannina
17:15	Križman 18', 50'; Pamlidis (yellow card) 84'	Report	Karachalios (yellow card) 85'; Krneta (yellow card) 88'	Stadium: Zosimades Stadium; Attendance: 2058; Referee: Georgios Tzovaras

1 December 2018 12	PAS Giannina	1-1	OFI	Ioannina
19:30	Tzimopoulos (yellow card) 30'; Vellidis (yellow card) 54'; Lila (yellow card) 62'; Athanasiadis 84'	Report	Potouridis 54'; Deligiannidis (yellow card) 80'; Strezos (yellow card) 88'; Papazoglou (yellow card) 90+5'	Stadium: Zosimades Stadium; Attendance: 3052; Referee: Georgios Lamprou

8 December 2018 13	Asteras Tripolis	1-0	PAS Giannina	Tripoli
17:15	Vlachos (yellow card) 46'; Pasalidis (yellow card) 71'; Fernández 90'	Report	Nikolias (yellow card) 45'; Tzimopoulos (yellow card) 90+3'	Stadium: Theodoros Kolokotronis; Attendance: 1264; Referee: Giorgos Kominis

15 December 2018 14	PAS Giannina	3-1	Panionios	Ioannina
17:15	Nikolias 51'; Križman (yellow card) 54'; Siontis (yellow card) 71'; Giakos 83', 89' (pen.); Athanasiadis (yellow card) 86'	Report	Papageorgiou (yellow card) 33'; Tsiloulis (yellow card) 74'; Durmishaj 82'	Stadium: Zosimades Stadium; Attendance: 2149; Referee: Anastasios Papapetrou

30 January 2019 15	PAOK	2-1	PAS Giannina	Thessaloniki
17:15	Pelkas 38' (pen.); Pelkas (yellow card) 45'; Świderski 87'; Giannoulis (yellow card) 90+6'	Report	Evangelou (yellow card) 17'; Skondras (yellow card) 29'; Križman (yellow card) 41'; Manos 52'; Lila (yellow card) 55'; Siontis (yellow card) 77'	Stadium: Toumba; Attendance: 10.837; Referee: Fotios Fotiadis

14 January 2019 16	PAS Giannina	0-4	AEK Athens	Ioannina
19:30	Athanasiadis (yellow card) 4'; Križman (yellow card) 11'	Report	Mantalos 5' (pen.); Bakasetas (yellow card) 7'; Michail 21' (o.g.); Oikonomou (yellow card) 43'; Ponce 45', 45+3'	Stadium: Zosimades Stadium; Attendance: 2800; Referee: Stefanos Koubarakis

19 January 2019 17	PAS Giannina	1-2	Olympiacos	Ioannina
17:15	Vuković 14' (o.g.); Boukouvalas (yellow card) 40'; Nikolias (yellow card) 59'; Pamlidis (yellow card) 72'; Athanasiadis (yellow card) 90+3'	Report	Skondras 8' (o.g.); Bouchalakis (yellow card) 23'; Christodoulopoulos 37'; Koutris (yellow card) 77'; Podence (yellow card) 84'	Stadium: Zosimades Stadium; Attendance: 3630; Referee: Ioannis Papadopoulos

26 January 2019 18	PAS Giannina	1-0	Apollon Smyrnis	Ioannina
17:15	Manos 6'; Michail (yellow card) 8'; Skondras (yellow card) 53'; Lila (yellow card) 66'	Report	Jaguaribe (yellow card) 4'; Vasic (red card) 75'	Stadium: Zosimades Stadium; Attendance: 2072; Referee: Praxitelis Zachariadis

3 February 2019 19	Aris Thessaloniki	1-0	PAS Giannina	Thessaloniki
19:00	Larsson (yellow card) 44'; Tzanakakis (yellow card) 47'; Diamantopoulos (yellow card) 72'; García 76'	Report	Fabry Castro (yellow card) 22'; Tzimopoulos (yellow card) 25'; Vellidis (yellow card) 34'; Athanasiadis (yellow card) 70'	Stadium: Kleanthis Vikelidis; Attendance: 7167; Referee: Stefanos Koubarakis

9 February 2019 20	PAS Giannina	1-0	Panathinaikos	Ioannina
19:30	Križman (yellow card) 21' (yellow-red card) 90+3'; Manos (yellow card) 47'; Athanasiadis 73'	Report	Bouzoukis (yellow card) 43'; Chatzitheodoridis (yellow card) 61'	Stadium: Zosimades Stadium; Attendance: 3564; Referee: Giorgos Kominis

16 February 2019 21	PAS Giannina	0-2	Atromitos	Ioannina
19:30	Fabry Castro (yellow card) 15'; Athanasiadis (yellow card) 71'	Report	Koulouris 11'; Chatziisaias (yellow card) 24'; Warda 50'; Risvanis (yellow card) 58'; Megyeri (yellow card) 84'	Stadium: Zosimades Stadium; Attendance: 2272; Referee: Athanasios Sezos

25 February 2019 22	Panetolikos	1-0	PAS Giannina	Agrinio
19:00	Arghus 79'	Report	Kargas (yellow card) 32'; Higor Vidal (yellow card) 42'; Michail (yellow card) 56'	Stadium: Panetolikos Stadium; Attendance: 1647; Referee: Aristotelis Diamantopoulos

2 March 2019 23	PAS Giannina	0-0	Xanthi	Ioannina
19:30	Kargas (yellow card) 25'; Michail (yellow card) 61' (yellow-red card) 80'; Fabry Castro (yellow card) 74'	Report	Baxevanidis (yellow card) 27'; Almeida (yellow card) 86'	Stadium: Zosimades Stadium; Attendance: 2079; Referee: Evagelos Gratsanis

10 March 2019 24	Lamia	1-1	PAS Giannina	Lamia
19:00	Karamanos 56'	Report	Tzimopoulos (yellow card) 36'; Pantelić (yellow card) 58'; Fabry Castro 86'	Stadium: Lamia Municipal Stadium; Attendance: 2103; Referee: Anastasios Papapetrou

16 March 2019 25	PAS Giannina	0-0	AEL	Ioannina
19:30		Report	Nunić (yellow card) 35' (yellow-red card) 74'; Bralić (yellow card) 39'	Stadium: Zosimades Stadium; Attendance: 2435; Referee: Praxitelis Zachariadis

30 March 2019 26	Levadiakos	0-2	PAS Giannina	Livadeia
17:15		Report	Boukouvalas (yellow card) 35'; Kargas (yellow card) 42' (yellow-red card) 50'; Nikolias 77'; Manos 95'	Stadium: Levadia Municipal Stadium; Attendance: 1184; Referee: Anastasios Sidiropoulos

6 April 2019 27	OFI	1-0	PAS Giannina	Heraklion, Crete
17:15	Vaz 20'; Mellado (yellow card) 57'; Vaz (yellow card) 86'; Braun (yellow card) 90+4'	Report	Shergelashvili (yellow card) 50'; Pantelić (yellow card) 58'; Nikolias (yellow card) 61'; Athanasiadis (yellow card) 70'; Križman (yellow card) 90+1'	Stadium: Theodoros Vardinogiannis; Attendance: 3469; Referee: Giorgos Kominis

14 April 2019 28	PAS Giannina	0-0	Asteras Tripolis	Ioannina
19:00	Michail (yellow card) 55'; Pamlidis (yellow card) 74'; Kargas (yellow card) 90+2'	Report	Pasalidis (yellow card) 51'; Martínez (yellow card) 74'; Triantafyllopoulos (yellow card) 81'	Stadium: Zosimades Stadium; Attendance: 3239; Referee: Ioannis Papadopoulos

21 April 2019 29	Panionios	2-1	PAS Giannina	Nea Smyrni, Athens
19:00	Masouras 7'; Spiridonović 65'; Stavropoulos (yellow card) 89'	Report	Križman 55' (pen.); Tzimopoulos (yellow card) 57'; Athanasiadis (yellow card) 69'	Stadium: Nea Smyrni Stadium; Attendance: 1350; Referee: Anastasios Papapetrou

5 May 2019 30	PAS Giannina	0-2	PAOK	Ioannina
19:00	Križman (yellow card) 29'; Tzimopoulos (yellow card) 56'; Kargas (yellow card) 57'; Fabry Castro (yellow card) 62'; Pantelić (yellow card) 66'; Michail (yellow card) 78'	Report	Pelkas (yellow card) 58'; Akpom 60'; Ingason (yellow card) 73'; Cañas (yellow card) 74'; Shakhov 79'	Stadium: Zosimades Stadium; Attendance: 2802; Referee: Anastasios Sidiropoulos

=== Greek Cup ===
PAS Giannina will enter the Greek Cup at the fourth round.

=== Group A ===
Pos	Team	Pld	W	D	L	GF	GA	GD	Pts	Qualification	ATR	PAS	IRA	THK
1	Atromitos	3	2	0	1	15	3	+12	6	Round of 16		1–2	—	—
2	PAS Giannina	3	2	0	1	7	3	+4	6	Round of 16	—		—	5–0
3	Iraklis	3	2	0	1	6	6	0	6		1–6	2–0		—
4	Thyella Kamari	3	0	0	3	0	16	−16	0		0–8	—	0–3	

Source: epo.gr
Rules for classification: 1. Points 2. Head-to-head points 3. Head-to-head goal difference 4. Goals scored 5. Goals against 6. Play-offs (neutral ground).

==== Matches ====
25 September 2018 1	Atromitos	1-2	PAS Giannina	Peristeri, Athens
21:30	Koulouris 76'	Report	Križman 18'; Michail (yellow card) 25'; Siontis (yellow card) 35' (yellow-red card) 50'; Xydas 40'; Michael (yellow card) 70'; Evangelou (yellow card) 71'; Kuzyk (yellow card) 90+4'	Stadium: Peristeri Stadium; Referee: Stefanos Koubarakis

1 November 2018 2	PAS Giannina	5-0	Thyella Kamari	Ioannina
19:30	Loukinas 2', 31', 41', 71'; Skondras 68'	Report		Stadium: Zosimades Stadium; Referee: Agelos Evagelou

18 December 2018 3	Iraklis	2-0	PAS Giannina	Thessaloniki
19:30	Rovas (yellow card) 22'; Rovas 58'; Cleyton 76'; Cleyton (yellow card) 89'; Perrone (yellow card) 90+1'	Report	Loukinas (yellow card) 46'; Evangelou (yellow card) 61'; Naumets (yellow card) 90+3'	Stadium: Kaftanzoglio Stadium

==== Round of 16 ====
8 January 2019 1st leg	PAS Giannina	1-1	Panionios	Ioannina
15:15	Križman 13'; Boukouvalas (yellow card) 23'	Report	Durmishaj 23' (pen.); Kurdi (yellow card) 41'	Stadium: Zosimades Stadium; Referee: Vasilis Fotias

22 January 2019 2nd leg	Panionios	2-0	PAS Giannina	Nea Smyrni, Athens
15:00	Stavropoulos (yellow card) 17'; Durmishaj 53' (pen.); Saramantas 75'; Saramantas (yellow card) 79'; Keita (yellow card) 87'	Report	Manos (yellow card) 29'; Evangelou (yellow card) 51'; Skondras (yellow card) 53'; Fabry Castro (yellow card) 78'	Stadium: Nea Smyrni Stadium; Referee: Georgios Vreskas

== Statistics ==
=== Appearances ===
No.	Pos.	Nat.	Name	Greek Super League	Greek Cup	Total
No.	Pos.	Nat.	Name	Apps	Apps	Apps
2	RB	(Greece)	Michalis Boukouvalas	24	2	26
3	DM	(Albania)	Andi Lila	19	1	20
4	CB	(Greece)	Stefanos Evangelou	1	4	5
5	CB	(Greece)	Giorgos Gogos	0	0	0
6	CB	(Greece)	Alexios Michail	26	3	29
7	CM / CF	(Greece)	Evripidis Giakos	21	3	24
8	CB	(New Zealand) (Greece)	Themistoklis Tzimopoulos	26	2	28
9	FW	(Greece)	Stefanos Athanasiadis	23	5	28
10	FW	(Croatia)	Sandi Križman	20	3	23
11	LB	(North Macedonia)	Mite Cikarski	7	2	9
12	GK	(Greece)	Kostas Peristeridis	0	0	0
14	FW	(Greece)	Georgios Pamlidis	15	4	19
15	LB	(Uganda)	Alex Kakuba	5	2	7
16	GK	(Greece)	Thodoris Venetikidis	0	0	0
17	LB	(Georgia (country))	Lasha Shergelashvili	10	1	11
17	MF	(Ukraine)	Orest Kuzyk	4	3	7
19	CB	(Greece)	Giannis Kargas	8	0	8
20	CM	(Greece)	Konstantinos Papadopoulos	0	0	0
21	MF	(Colombia)	Fabry Castro	16	4	20
22	CM	(Greece)	Stefanos Siontis	12	2	14
23	FW	(Greece)	Stavros Pilios	0	0	0
25	FW	(Greece)	Giannis Loukinas	1	2	3
27	FW	(Greece)	Dimitrios Manos	14	1	15
27	CF / W	(Greece)	Giannis Mystakidis	10	0	10
28	MF	(Greece)	Giorgos Xydas	15	4	19
29	FW	(France)	Jean-Baptiste Léo	14	0	14
30	GK	(Greece)	Giorgos Papaioannou	0	0	0
33	CF / RW / CM	(Brazil)	Higor Vidal	15	3	18
35	MF	(Serbia)	Dušan Pantelić	11	0	11
39	GK	(Greece)	Markos Vellidis	21	1	22
44	CB	(Greece)	Apostolos Skondras	19	4	23
55	CF / RLW	(Serbia)	Enes Dolovac	4	0	4
77	RB	(Greece)	Alexis Apostolopoulos	16	5	21
80	CM	(Greece)	Angelos Liasos	0	0	0
88	CM / RLW	(Greece)	Alexandros Nikolias	28	1	29
93	GK	(Cyprus)	Neofytos Michael	9	4	13
99	MF	(Ukraine)	Vladyslav Naumets	3	3	6

Super League Greece

=== Goalscorers ===
No.	Pos.	Nat.	Name	Greek Super League	Greek Cup	Total
No.	Pos.	Nat.	Name	Goals	Goals	Goals
10	FW	(Croatia)	Sandi Križman	4	2	6
25	FW	(Greece)	Giannis Loukinas	0	4	4
88	CM / RLW	(Greece)	Alexandros Nikolias	3	0	3
27	FW	(Greece)	Dimitrios Manos	3	0	3
7	CM / CF	(Greece)	Evripidis Giakos	2	0	2
9	FW	(Greece)	Stefanos Athanasiadis	2	0	2
21	MF	(Colombia)	Fabry Castro	1	0	1
27	CF / W	(Greece)	Giannis Mystakidis	1	0	1
28	MF	(Greece)	Giorgos Xydas	0	1	1
29	FW	(France)	Jean-Baptiste Léo	1	0	1
44	CB	(Greece)	Apostolos Skondras	0	1	1
			Own goals	2	0	2

Super League Greece

=== Clean sheets ===
No.	Pos.	Nat.	Name	Greek Super League	Greek Cup	Total
No.	Pos.	Nat.	Name	CS	CS	CS
12	GK	(Greece)	Kostas Peristeridis	0 (0)	0 (0)	0 (0)
16	GK	(Greece)	Thodoris Venetikidis	0 (0)	0 (0)	0 (0)
30	GK	(Greece)	Giorgos Papaioannou	0 (0)	0 (0)	0 (0)
39	GK	(Greece)	Markos Vellidis	5 (21)	0 (1)	5 (22)
93	GK	(Cyprus)	Neofytos Michael	4 (9)	1 (4)	5 (13)

=== Disciplinary record ===
S	P	N	Name	Super League			Greek Cup			Total		
S	P	N	Name	Yellow card	Yellow-red card	Red card	Yellow card	Yellow-red card	Red card	Yellow card	Yellow-red card	Red card
2	RB	(Greece)	Michalis Boukouvalas	2	0	0	1	0	0	3	0	0
3	DM	(Albania)	Andi Lila	7	0	0	0	0	0	7	0	0
4	CB	(Greece)	Stefanos Evangelou	1	0	0	3	0	0	4	0	0
6	CB	(Greece)	Alexios Michail	4	2	0	1	0	0	5	2	0
7	CM / CF	(Greece)	Evripidis Giakos	2	0	0	0	0	0	2	0	0
8	CB	(New Zealand) (Greece)	Themistoklis Tzimopoulos	9	0	0	0	0	0	9	0	0
9	FW	(Greece)	Stefanos Athanasiadis	10	0	0	0	0	0	10	0	0
10	FW	(Croatia)	Sandi Križman	7	1	0	0	0	0	7	1	0
11	LB	(North Macedonia)	Mite Cikarski	1	1	0	0	0	0	1	1	0
14	FW	(Greece)	Georgios Pamlidis	3	0	0	0	0	0	3	0	0
17	LB	(Georgia (country))	Lasha Shergelashvili	1	0	0	0	0	0	1	0	0
17	MF	(Ukraine)	Orest Kuzyk	0	0	0	1	0	0	1	0	0
19	CB	(Greece)	Giannis Kargas	4	1	0	0	0	0	4	1	0
21	MF	(Colombia)	Fabry Castro	5	1	0	1	0	0	6	1	0
22	CM	(Greece)	Stefanos Siontis	5	0	0	0	1	0	5	1	0
25	FW	(Greece)	Giannis Loukinas	0	0	0	1	0	0	1	0	0
27	FW	(Greece)	Dimitrios Manos	1	0	0	1	0	0	2	0	0
27	CF / W	(Greece)	Giannis Mystakidis	1	0	0	0	0	0	1	0	0
28	MF	(Greece)	Giorgos Xydas	1	0	0	0	0	0	1	0	0
33	CF / RW / CM	(Brazil)	Higor Vidal	2	0	0	0	0	0	2	0	0
35	MF	(Serbia)	Dušan Pantelić	3	0	0	0	0	0	3	0	0
39	GK	(Greece)	Markos Vellidis	6	0	0	0	0	0	6	0	0
44	CB	(Greece)	Apostolos Skondras	4	0	0	1	0	0	5	0	0
55	CF / RLW	(Serbia)	Enes Dolovac	1	0	0	0	0	0	1	0	0
77	RB	(Greece)	Alexis Apostolopoulos	1	0	0	0	0	0	1	0	0
88	CM / RLW	(Greece)	Alexandros Nikolias	6	0	0	0	0	0	6	0	0
93	GK	(Cyprus)	Neofytos Michael	0	0	0	1	0	0	1	0	0
99	MF	(Ukraine)	Vladyslav Naumets	0	0	0	1	0	0	1	0	0
