= 2015–16 PAS Giannina F.C. season =

PAS Giannina
2015–16 season
- Chairman: Giorgos Christovasilis
- Manager: Giannis Petrakis
- Stadium: Zosimades Stadium, Ioannina
- Super League: 6th
- Greek Cup: Round of 16, eliminated by Panathinaikos
- Top goalscorer: League: Michalis Manias; 10 goals All: Michalis Manias; 10 goals
- Highest home attendance: 4484; Olympiacos
- Lowest home attendance: 1170; Levadiakos
- Average home league attendance: 2128
Home colours	Away colours	Third colours

The 2015–16 season is PAS Giannina F.C.'s 21st competitive season in the top flight of Greek football, 6th season in the Super League Greece, and 50th year in existence as a football club. They also compete in the Greek Cup.

== Players ==
updated:30/6/2016

No.	Name	Nationality	Position(s)	Place of birth	Date of birth	Signed from	Notes
Goalkeepers
1	Alexandros Paschalakis	(Greece)	GK	Athens, Greece	28 July 1989	(Greece) Panthrakikos	
12	Kostas Peristeridis	(Greece)	GK	Chania, Crete, Greece	24 January 1991	(Greece) Platanias	
13	Nikolaos Koliofoukas	(Greece)	GK	Ioannina, Greece	11 September 1996	(Greece) Thesprotos	
Defenders
4	Thodoris Berios	(Greece)	CB	Athens, Greece	21 March 1989	(Czech Republic) Čáslav	
6	Alexios Michail (C)	(Greece)	CB	Ioannina, Greece	18 August 1986	(Greece) Panserraikos	
8	Themistoklis Tzimopoulos (VC)	(New Zealand) (Greece)	CB	Kozani, Greece	20 November 1985	(Greece) Ethnikos Asteras	
17	David López Nadales	(Spain)	LB	Zaragoza, Aragon, Spain	22 January 1986	(Romania) Săgeata Năvodari	
20	Nikos Karanikas	(Greece)	RB	Larissa, Greece	4 March 1992	(Greece) AEL	
23	Andraž Struna	(Slovenia)	RB	Piran, SFR Yugoslavia	23 April 1989	(Poland) Cracovia	
27	Leonardo Koutris	(Greece) (Brazil)	LB	Rhodes, Greece	23 July 1995	(Greece) Ergotelis	
42	Konstantinos Mavropanos	(Greece)	CB	Athens, Greece	11 December 1997	(Greece) Apollon Smyrnis Academy	
44	Apostolos Skondras	(Greece)	CB	Athens, Greece	29 December 1988	(Greece) AEL	
Midfielders
3	Andi Lila	(Albania)	DM	Kavajë, Albania	12 February 1986	(Albania) KF Tirana	
5	Iraklis Garoufalias	(Greece)	DM / CM	Athens, Greece	1 May 1993	(Greece) Fostiras	
7	Evripidis Giakos	(Greece)	CM / CF	Ioannina, Greece	9 April 1991	(Greece) Doxa Kranoula	
11	Noé Acosta	(Spain)	CM / LW	Guadalajara, Castilla-La Mancha, Spain	10 December 1983	(Greece) Olympiacos Volos	
19	Antonis Iliadis	(Greece)	CM	Imathia, Greece	27 July 1993	(Greece) Makrochori	
21	Stavros Tsoukalas	(Greece)	CM	Thessaloniki, Greece	28 May 1988	(Greece) PAOK	
22	Chrysovalantis Kozoronis	(Greece)	DM	Heraklion, Crete, Greece	3 August 1992	(Greece) Ergotelis	
49	Giannis Ioannou	(Greece)	CM	Ioannina, Greece	27 May 1994	(Greece) Thesprotos	
88	Alexandros Nikolias	(Greece)	CM / RLW	Kymi, Euboea, Greece	23 July 1994	(Greece) Olympiacos Volos	
98	Alexandros Masouras	(Greece)	DM	Ioannina, Greece	21 March 1998	(Greece) PAS Giannina U20	
Forwards
9	Brana Ilić	(Serbia)	CF	Golubinci, SFR Yugoslavia	16 February 1985	(Kazakhstan) FC Aktobe	
33	Michalis Manias	(Greece)	CF	Rhodes, Greece	20 February 1990	(Greece) Aris	
77	Dimitrios Ferfelis	(Greece) (Germany)	CF	Delmenhorst, Germany	5 April 1993	(Netherlands) PEC Zwolle	
Left during Winter Transfer Window
1	Markos Vellidis	(Greece)	GK	Kastoria, Greece	4 April 1987	(Greece) Aris	
10	Cristian Gabriel Chávez	(Argentina)	CM	Lomas de Zamora, Argentina	4 June 1987	(Argentina) Almirante Brown	
14	Stamatis Sapalidis	(Greece)	CF	Athens, Greece	5 July 1990	(Greece) Alimos	

=== International players ===
- (Albania) Andi Lila (men's, U-21/19/17)
- (Greece) Markos Vellidis
- (Greece) Kostas Peristeridis (Men's & U-19)
- (New Zealand) Themistoklis Tzimopoulos
- (Slovenia) Andraž Struna (men's, U-21/20)
- (Serbia) Brana Ilić
- (Greece) Leonardo Koutris (U-21/19)

=== Foreign players ===
EU Nationals
- (Spain) (Europe) David López Nadales
- (Spain) (Europe) Noé Acosta
- (Slovenia) (Europe) Andraž Struna

EU Nationals (Dual Citizenship)
- (New Zealand) (Greece) (Europe) Themistoklis Tzimopoulos
- (Brazil) (Greece) (Europe) Leonardo Koutris
- (Germany) (Greece) (Europe) Dimitrios Ferfelis

Non-EU Nationals
- (Albania) Andi Lila
- (Serbia) Brana Ilić
- (Argentina) Cristian Chávez

== Personnel ==
=== Management ===
Position	Staff
Majority Owner	Giorgos Christovasilis
President and CEO	Giorgos Christovasilis
Director of Football	Dimitris Niarchakos
Director of Office	Alekos Potsis
Head of Ticket Department	Andreas Potsis

=== Coaching staff ===
Position	Name
Head coach	Giannis Petrakis
Assistant coach	Giorgos Georgoulopoulos
Fitness coach	Vasilis Alexiou
Goalkeepers Coach	Christos Tseliopoulos

=== medical staff ===
Position	Name
Head doctor	Stavros Restanis
Exercise Physiology-Nutritionist	Athanasios Tziamourtas
Physio	Filippos Skordos
Physio	Giannis Balaouras
Physio	S. Stefanou

=== Academy ===
Position	Name
Head of Youth Development	Giorgos Georgoulopoulos
Head coach U-20	Christos Agelis
Head coach U-17	Lazaros Semos
Head coach U-15	Anastasios Anthimiadis

== Transfers ==
=== Summer ===
==== In ====
No	Pos	Player	Transferred from	Fee	Date	Source
13	GK	Nikolaos Koliofoukas	Thesprotos	Loan return	5 June 2015	
77	FW	Dimitrios Ferfelis	PEC Zwolle	-	10 June 2015	
12	GK	Kostas Peristeridis	Platanias	-	22 June 2015	
20	RB	Nikos Karanikas	AEL	-	23 June 2015	
22	MF	Chrysovalantis Kozoronis	Ergotelis	-	19 July 2015	
49	MF	Giannis Ioannou	Thesprotos	Loan return	31 July 2015	
98	MF	Alexandros Masouras	PAS Giannina U-17	-	22 August 2015	
3	MF	Andi Lila	Parma	Loan return	26 August 2015	

==== Out ====
No	Pos	Player	Transferred to	Fee	Date	Source
77	GK	Dimitris Sotiriou	Platanias	-	16 June 2015	
15	MF	Charis Charisis	PAOK	€480,000	25 June 2015	
33	MF	Nikos Korovesis	PAOK	€380,000	25 June 2015	
14	FW	Giannis Nakos	Thesprotos	-	3 July 2015	
-	RB	Arben Muskaj	Bylis Ballsh	-	14 July 2015	
2	RB	Georgios Dasios	Olympiacos Volos	-	6 August 2015	
18	MF	Michalis Avgenikou	Ergotelis	-	29 August 2015	
25	FW	Tasos Kritikos	AEL	-	29 August 2015	

For recent transfers, see List of Greek football transfers summer 2015

=== Winter ===
==== In ====
No	Pos	Player	Transferred from	Fee	Date	Source
42	CB	Konstantinos Mavropanos	Apollon Smyrnis Academy	-	4 January 2016	
88	MF	Alexandros Nikolias	Olympiacos Volos	€50,000	11 January 2016	
27	LB	Leonardo Koutris	Ergotelis	-	26 January 2016	
1	GK	Alexandros Paschalakis	Panthrakikos	-	26 January 2016	

==== Out ====
No	Pos	Player	Transferred to	Fee	Date	Source
1	GK	Markos Vellidis	PAOK	€750,000	19 January 2016	
14	CF	Stamatis Sapalidis	Kissamikos	-	20 January 2016	
10	CM	Cristian Gabriel Chávez	Brown de Adrogué	-	28 January 2016	

For recent transfers, see -

== Pre-season and friendlies ==
Win Draw Loss Upcoming fixture

18 July 2015 Friendly	PAS Giannina	4–1	Panetolikos	Karpenisi
18:30	Apostolis Katsetis 26'; Fefelis 35'; Sapalidis 53'; Tzimopoulos 85'	Report	Abdel Salam Fouflia Saanto 90'	Stadium: Athletic center of Karpenisi; Attendance: unknown Referee: Koliokotsios

23 July 2015 Friendly	PAS Giannina	1-3	Iraklis Thessaloniki	Karpenisi
18:00	Fefelis 13'	Report	Romano 5'; Lazăr 48'; Bulut 55'	Stadium: Athletic center of Karpenisi; Attendance: unknown Referee: Chrisafopoulos

29 July 2015 Friendly	Kassiopi	2-0	PAS Giannina	Kerkyra
18:30	Konstantinos Georgakopoulos 40'; Kajkut 53'	Report		Stadium: Kerkyra Stadium; Attendance: unknown Referee: Nikos Poulimas

1 August 2015 Friendly	Asteras Tripolis	1-0	PAS Giannina	Tripoli
19:00	Shkurti 3'	Report		Stadium: Theodoros Kolokotronis Stadium; Attendance: unknown Referee: Giannis Delfakis

8 August 2015 Friendly	PAS Giannina	0-1	Panelefsiniakos	Ioannina
18:30		Report	Stratos Doukakis 12'	Stadium: PEAKI; Attendance: 400; Referee: Giorgos Tasis

9 August 2015 Friendly	PAS Giannina	3–0	Panetolikos	Ioannina
18:30	Chávez 13'; Ilić 77'; Tsoukalas 91'	Report		Stadium: Zosimades Stadium; Attendance: 2000; Referee: Alexandros Katsikogiannis

16 August 2015 Friendly	PAS Giannina	1–0	Kassiopi	Ioannina
18:30	Giakos 81'	Report		Stadium: Zosimades Stadium; Attendance: 600; Referee: Christos Mitsios

17 August 2015 Friendly	Proodeftiki Perama	1-6	PAS Giannina	Perama
18:00	Dimitris Sichlimoiris 16'	Report	Sapalidis 14', 20' (?? (20-35)); Avgenikou 36'; Kritikos 52'; Mavropanos 74'	Stadium: Giorgos Priskas Stadium; Attendance: unknown Referee: Spiros Zampalas
Note: The match was held to Giorgos Priskas' memorial.

23 April 2016 Friendly	PAS Giannina	1–0	FK Donji Srem	Ioannina
15:00	Tsoukalas 79'	Report		Stadium: Zosimades Stadium; Referee: Christos Mitsios

26 April 2016 Friendly	Panetolikos	1-1	PAS Giannina	Agrinio
17:00	Rusculleda 70'	Report	Marcos Paulo 25' (o.g.)	Stadium: Panetolikos Stadium; Referee: Vasilis Panagiotopoulos

== Competitions ==
=== League table ===
Pos	Team	Pld	W	D	L	GF	GA	GD	Pts	Qualification or relegation
4	PAOK (Note: PAOK were deducted 3 points due to extreme fan behavior against Olympiacos in Greek Cup semifinal match.)	30	13	9	8	45	32	+13	45	Qualification for the Play-offs
5	Panionios	30	12	8	10	33	27	+6	44	Qualification for the Play-offs
6	PAS Giannina	30	12	6	12	36	40	−4	42	Qualification for the Europa League second qualifying round (Note: The fifth-placed team of the 2015–16 Super League Greece Panionios would have qualified for the UEFA Europa League second qualifying round, but were excluded from participating in the 2016–17 European competitions by UEFA for financial reasons. As a result, the berth was given to the sixth-placed team PAS Giannina.)
7	Asteras Tripolis	30	11	8	11	31	30	+1	41	
8	Atromitos (Note: Atromitos were deducted 3 points due to extreme fan behavior against AEK.)	30	12	6	12	26	31	−5	39 (Note: Head-to-head points: Atromitos 4, Platanias 1.)	

Source: Super League Greece
Rules for classification: 1) Points; 2) Head-to-head points; 3) Head-to-head goal difference; 4) Goals scored; 5) Goals against; 6) Play-offs (neutral ground); 7) Draw.
(Note: Criteria 6 is only used if needed to decide champion, teams for relegation or teams for UEFA competitions).

==== Results summary ====
Overall								Home						Away					
Pld	W	D	L	GF	GA	GD	Pts	W	D	L	GF	GA	GD	W	D	L	GF	GA	GD
30	12	6	12	36	40	−4	42	7	3	5	19	17	+2	5	3	7	17	23	−6

==== Fixtures ====
Win Draw Loss Upcoming fixture

23 August 2015 1	Veria	1-1	PAS Giannina	Veria
19:15	Abdoun (yellow card) 49'; Nazlidis 90+2'	Report	Berios (yellow card) 8'; Acosta 43'	Stadium: Veria Stadium; Attendance: 827; Referee: Athanasios Tzilos

30 August 2015 2	PAS Giannina	3-1	PAOK	Ioannina
21:30	Manias 5'; Sabo 51' (o.g.); Chávez (yellow card) 48'; Chávez 75'; Ferfelis (yellow card) 87'	Report	Kaçe (yellow card) 24'; Sabo (yellow card) 42'; Jairo (yellow card) 45' (yellow-red card) 62'; Vítor 90+2'	Stadium: Zosimades Stadium; Attendance: 3273; Referee: Athanasios Giachos

13 September 2015 3	AEK Athens	3-1	PAS Giannina	Athens
16:00	Buonanotte 35' (pen.), 44'; Vargas 87'	Report	Acosta 20'; Michail (yellow card) 30' (yellow-red card) 74'; Struna (yellow card) 32'; Berios (yellow card) 34'; Tzimopoulos (yellow card) 38' (yellow-red card) 80'	Stadium: OAKA; Attendance: 14567; Referee: Stavros Mantalos

23 September 2015 4	PAS Giannina	1–0	Atromitos	Ioannina
18:15	Tsoukalas 29'; Ilić (yellow card) 40'; Lila (yellow card) 69'; Chávez (yellow card) 77'	Report	Stojčev (yellow card) 45+1'; Kivrakidis (yellow card) 69'	Stadium: Zosimades Stadium; Attendance: 1686; Referee: Dimitris Styliaras

26 September 2015 5	Olympiacos	5-1	PAS Giannina	Piraeus
20:30	Kasami 31'; Fortounis 32'; Masuaku (yellow card) 36'; Botía 42'; Salino (yellow card) 45+1'; Tzimopoulos 52' (o.g.); Durmaz 72' (pen.)	Report	Acosta (yellow card) 45+1'; Lila 86'	Stadium: Karaiskakis Stadium; Attendance: 17248; Referee: Ioannis Papadopoulos

4 October 2015 6	PAS Giannina	2-2	Iraklis	Ioannina
18:15	Ilić 32'; Kozoronis 62'; Kozoronis (yellow card) 72'; Berios (yellow card) 90'	Report	Vellios 35'; Stamou (yellow card) 61'; Kyriakidis 65'; Boukouvalas (yellow card) 84'	Stadium: Zosimades Stadium; Attendance: 2282; Referee: Anastasios Papapetrou

19 October 2015 7	Panathinaikos	3-1	PAS Giannina	Athens
16:00	Karelis 17'; Petrić 60' (pen.); Nano (yellow card) 65'; Tavlaridis (yellow card) 70'; Zeca (yellow card) 75'; Abeid 90+3'	Report	Michail (yellow card) 53'; Berios (yellow card) 59'; Chávez 71' (pen.); Ferfelis (yellow card) 81'; Chávez (yellow card) 83'; Manias (yellow card) 90'	Stadium: Leoforos Stadium; Attendance: 7823; Referee: Marios Lampropoulos

25 October 2015 8	PAS Giannina	1-2	Asteras Tripolis	Ioannina
17:15	Manias 4'; Tzimopoulos (yellow card) 23'; Struna (yellow card) 38'; Tsoukalas (yellow card) 74'; Nadales (yellow card) 80'; Skondras (yellow card) 90+2'	Report	Iglesias (yellow card) 25'; Giannou 39' (pen.), 81'; Lanzarote (yellow card) 54'; Kourbelis (yellow card) 61'	Stadium: Zosimades Stadium; Attendance: 1619; Referee: Dimitris Styliaras

1 November 2015 9	PAS Giannina	2-0	Panthrakikos	Ioannina
17:15	Nadales (yellow card) 60'; Michail 67'; Vellidis (yellow card) 80'; Kozoronis (yellow card) 90+1'; Ilić 90+2'	Report	Javito (yellow card) 35'; Igor (yellow card) 39'; Martins (yellow card) 73'; Melissis (yellow card) 77'; Cherfa (yellow card) 88'; Potouridis (yellow card) 90+2'	Stadium: Zosimades Stadium; Attendance: 1658; Referee: Ananias Fotiadis

9 November 2015 10	Panetolikos	2-1	PAS Giannina	Agrinio
19:30	Kevin (yellow card) 37'; Tsoukalas 43' (o.g.); Markovski 56'	Report	Nadales (yellow card) 22'; Karanikas (yellow card) 45'; Michail (yellow card) 83'; Iliadis 90'	Stadium: Panetolikos Stadium; Attendance: 1836; Referee: Anastasios Papapetrou

21 November 2015 11	PAS Giannina	2-1	AEL Kalloni	Ioannina
17:15	Manias 7', 79'; Nadales (yellow card) 29'; Michail (yellow card) 40' (yellow-red card) 90+7'; Tzimopoulos (yellow card) 55'; Karanikas (yellow card) 80'	Report	Keita (yellow card) 13'; Bargan (yellow card) 26'; Ukah (yellow card) 57' (yellow-red card) 83'; Bargan 64'; Manousos (yellow card) 80'	Stadium: Zosimades Stadium; Attendance: 1370; Referee: Dimitris Karantonis

28 November 2015 12	Panionios	2-0	PAS Giannina	Nea Smyrni
17:15	Ansarifard 5', 20'; Masouras (yellow card) 45+1'	Report		Stadium: Nea Smyrni Stadium; Attendance: 1395; Referee: Athanasios Tzilos

6 December 2015 13	PAS Giannina	0-1	Levadiakos	Ioannina
17:15	Lila (yellow card) 72'; Karanikas (yellow card) 80'; Ferfelis (yellow card) 84'	Report	Christos Mingas 67'; Domovchiyski (yellow card) 72'; Nicolaou (yellow card) 83'; Mantzios (yellow card) 85'; Christos Mingas (yellow card) 87'; Mattheos Louis Kapsaskis (yellow card) 90+1'	Stadium: Zosimades Stadium; Attendance: 1170; Referee: Andreas Pappas

12 December 2015 14	Platanias	0-1	PAS Giannina	Platanias
17:15	Mendrinos (yellow card) 73'	Report	Giakos 17'; Garoufalias (yellow card) 27'; Karanikas (yellow card) 33'; Tzimopoulos (yellow card) 47'; Manias (yellow card) 54'; Acosta (yellow card) 87'	Stadium: Perivolia Municipal Stadium; Attendance: 1605; Referee: Marios Labropoulos

20 December 2015 15	PAS Giannina	1-1	Xanthi	Ioannina
17:15	Struna (yellow card) 6'; Tsoukalas 49' (pen.); Garoufalias (yellow card) 60'; Iliadis (yellow card) 66'; Tzimopoulos (yellow card) 89'	Report	Lucero (yellow card) 11'; Herea 80'	Stadium: Zosimades Stadium; Attendance: 1456; Referee: Ilias Spathas

2 January 2016 16	PAS Giannina	2-0	Veria	Ioannina
17:15	Manias 10'; Tzimopoulos 84'; Tsoukalas (yellow card) 85'	Report	Giannoulis (yellow card) 25' (yellow-red card) 82'; Ostojić (yellow card) 82'; López (yellow card) 89'	Stadium: Zosimades Stadium; Attendance: 1477; Referee: Aristidis Vatsios

10 January 2016 17	PAOK	3-1	PAS Giannina	Thessaloniki
15:00	Athanasiadis 43'; Tzavellas (yellow card) 50'; Charisis 52'; Jairo 64'	Report	Giakos (yellow card) 33'; Skondras (yellow card) 45+1'; Kozoronis 90'	Stadium: Toumba Stadium; Attendance: 7390; Referee: Giorgos Kizas

17 January 2016 18	PAS Giannina	0-2	AEK Athens	Ioannina
15:00	Lila (yellow card) 18'; Tsoukalas (yellow card) 53'	Report	Vargas 6'; Soiledis (yellow card) 23'; Simões (yellow card) 49'; Mantalos (yellow card) 55'; Barbosa 59'	Stadium: Zosimades Stadium; Attendance: 3222; Referee: Konstantinos Kotsanis

24 January 2016 19	Atromitos	0-2	PAS Giannina	Athens
17:15	Keita (yellow card) 13'; Lazaridis (yellow card) 15'	Report	Lila (yellow card) 55'; Struna (yellow card) 68'; Manias 72'; Nadales (yellow card) 80'; Tsoukalas 89'	Stadium: Peristeri Stadium; Attendance: 585; Referee: Spiros Selimos

31 January 2016 20	PAS Giannina	0-3	Olympiacos	Ioannina
19:30	Acosta (yellow card) 20'; Manias (yellow card) 24'; Kozoronis (yellow card) 58'	Report	Fortounis 13', 25' (pen.); Durmaz (yellow card) 20'; Durmaz 57'	Stadium: Zosimades Stadium; Attendance: 4484; Referee: Marios Labropoulos

7 February 2016 21	Iraklis	1-0	PAS Giannina	Thessaloniki
15:00	Vellios 33' (pen.); Ziabaris (yellow card) 57'; Saramantas (yellow card) 82'; Bulut (yellow card) 90+2'	Report	Peristeridis (yellow card) 32'; Garoufalias (yellow card) 41'; Nikolias (yellow card) 64' (yellow-red card) 87'; Kozoronis (yellow card) 79'; Karanikas (yellow card) 90'	Stadium: Kaftanzoglio Stadium; Attendance: 1400; Referee: Dimitris Styliaras

14 February 2016 22	PAS Giannina	0-3	Panathinaikos	Ioannina
15:00	Acosta (yellow card) 53'; Karanikas (yellow card) 65'; Ilić (yellow card) 76'	Report	Vlachodimos 26'; Zeca (yellow card) 36' (yellow-red card) 39'; Abeid (yellow card) 53'; Thelander (yellow card) 54'; Pranjić (yellow card) 68'; Lagos (yellow card) 74'; Berg 82', 90+1'	Stadium: Zosimades Stadium; Attendance: 2703; Referee: Ioannis Delfakis

20 February 2016 23	Asteras Tripolis	0-0	PAS Giannina	Tripoli
17:15	Hamdani (yellow card) 23'; Zisopoulos (yellow card) 37'; Ioannidis (yellow card) 68'	Report	Garoufalias (yellow card) 28'; Ilić (yellow card) 61'	Stadium: Theodoros Kolokotronis Stadium; Attendance: 1348; Referee: Evagelos Kiotzenis

28 February 2016 24	Panthrakikos	2-4	PAS Giannina	Komotini
17:15	Igor 12'; Diguiny 55' (pen.); Papageorgiou (yellow card) 90'	Report	Giannis Christou 36' (o.g.); Michail (yellow card) 54'; Skondras 67'; Manias 73'; Ilić 85'	Stadium: Komotini Municipal Stadium; Attendance: 789; Referee: Anastasios Papapetrou

5 March 2016 25	PAS Giannina	2-0	Panetolikos	Ioannina
15:00	Lila 73'; Skondras (yellow card) 79'; Michail (yellow card) 87'; Acosta 90+2'	Report	Kevin (yellow card) 32'; Kappel (yellow card) 60'; Marcos Paulo (yellow card) 66'; Mygas (yellow card) 76'	Stadium: Zosimades Stadium; Attendance: 1508; Referee: Dimitrios Karantonis

12 March 2016 26	AEL Kalloni	0–2	PAS Giannina	Mytilene
17:15		Report	Manias (yellow card) 25'; Tzimopoulos 43'; Skondras (yellow card) 54'; Nadales (yellow card) 57'; Peristeridis (yellow card) 88'; Manias 90'	Stadium: Mytilene Municipal Stadium; Attendance: 534; Referee: Ananias Fotiadis

21 March 2016 27	PAS Giannina	1-1	Panionios	Ioannina
19:30	Ilić 23'; Skondras (yellow card) 37'; Manias (yellow card) 74' (yellow-red card) 76'	Report	Risvanis (yellow card) 65' (yellow-red card) 78'; Chalkiadakis (yellow card) 76'; Ansarifard (yellow card) 76'; Karamanos 84'; Oikonomou (yellow card) 90+1'	Stadium: Zosimades Stadium; Attendance: 1914; Referee: Athanasios Tzilos

3 April 2016 28	Levadiakos	1-1	PAS Giannina	Livadeia
19:00	Giakoumakis 90+3'	Report	Lila (yellow card) 26'; Berios (yellow card) 82'; Giakos 85'; Giakos (yellow card) 85'	Stadium: Levadia Municipal Stadium; Attendance: 592; Referee: Michail Voskakis

10 April 2016 29	PAS Giannina	2–0	Platanias	Ioannina
19:00	Manias 23', 84'; Lila (yellow card) 74'	Report	Stanisavljević (yellow card) 50'; Munafo (yellow card) 82'	Stadium: Zosimades Stadium; Attendance: 2099; Referee: Ilias Spathas

17 April 2016 30	Xanthi	0-1	PAS Giannina	Xanthi
19:00	Orfanidis (yellow card) 79'	Report	Tzimopoulos (yellow card) 37'; Tsoukalas 45+1'; Koutris (yellow card) 51'; Lila (yellow card) 73'; Peristeridis (yellow card) 90+1'; Iliadis (yellow card) 90+2'	Stadium: Xanthi Arena; Attendance: 1430; Referee: Marios Labropoulos

=== Greek cup ===
PAS Giannina will enter the Greek Cup at the Group stage.

=== Group A ===
Pos	Team	Pld	W	D	L	GF	GA	GD	Pts	Qualification	IRA	PAS	ACH	KRD
1	Iraklis	3	2	1	0	7	1	+6	7	Round of 16		—	—	4–0
2	PAS Giannina	3	1	2	0	3	2	+1	5	Round of 16	1–1		—	—
3	Acharnaikos	3	1	0	2	2	4	−2	3		0–2	1–2		—
4	Anagennisi Karditsa	3	0	1	2	0	5	−5	1		—	0–0	0–1	

Source: epo.gr

==== Matches ====
29 October 2015 1	PAS Giannina	1-1	Iraklis	Ioannina
19:30	Karanikas (yellow card) 36'; Struna (yellow card) 61'; Chávez 75'	Report	Chanti (yellow card) 40'; Romano (yellow card) 45+1'; Intzoglou (yellow card) 60'; Loukinas 77'	Stadium: Zosimades Stadium; Referee: Dimitris Karantonis

1 December 2015 2	Acharnaikos	1-2	PAS Giannina	Acharnes
15:00	Obradović (yellow card) 60'; Antonis Athanasiou (yellow card) 63'; Giannis Kostopoulos 65'	Report	Kozoronis (yellow card) 21' (yellow-red card) 69'; Giakos 50'; Tzimopoulos (yellow card) 64'; Berios (yellow card) 75'; Sapalidis 89'; Sapalidis (yellow card) 89'; Peristeridis (yellow card) 90+3'	Stadium: Acharnes Stadium; Referee: Vagelis Kiotzenis

15 December 2015 3	Anagennisi Karditsa	0-0	PAS Giannina	Karditsa
15:00	Tsitas (yellow card) 14'; Argyriou (yellow card) 57'; Dimopoulos (yellow card) 64'	Report	Michail (yellow card) 17'; Ferfelis (yellow card) 24'; Garoufalias (yellow card) 70'	Stadium: Municipal Stadium of Karditsa; Referee: Giorgos Kizas

==== Round of 16 ====
7 January 2016 1st leg	PAS Giannina	1-2	Panathinaikos	Ioannina
15:00	Acosta 57'; Karanikas (red card) 67'; Tsoukalas (yellow card) 77'; Tzimopoulos (yellow card) 85'	Report	Pranjić (yellow card) 20'; Abeid 75'; Petrić 78'	Stadium: Zosimades Stadium; Referee: Stavros Mantalos

14 January 2016 2nd leg	Panathinaikos	0–1 (a2 – 2 agg.)	PAS Giannina	Athens
19:30	Berg (yellow card) 57'; Wemmer (yellow card) 85'	Report	Skondras (yellow card) 47'; Karanikas (yellow card) 72'; Ferfelis 90+3'	Stadium: Leoforos Stadium; Referee: Dimitros Karantonis

== Statistics ==
=== Appearances ===
No.	Pos.	Nat.	Name	Greek Super League	Greek Cup	Total
No.	Pos.	Nat.	Name	Apps	Apps	Apps
1	GK	(Greece)	Alexandros Paschalakis	0	0	0
1	GK	(Greece)	Markos Vellidis	18	3	21
3	DM	(Albania)	Andi Lila	19	3	22
4	CB	(Greece)	Thodoris Berios	17	3	20
5	DM / CM	(Greece)	Iraklis Garoufalias	12	3	15
6	CB	(Greece)	Alexios Michail	25	3	28
7	CM / CF	(Greece)	Evripidis Giakos	25	5	30
8	CB	(New Zealand) (Greece)	Themistoklis Tzimopoulos	25	5	30
9	CF	(Serbia)	Brana Ilić	27	3	30
10	CM	(Argentina)	Cristian Gabriel Chávez	12	2	14
11	CM / LW	(Spain)	Noé Acosta	29	2	31
12	GK	(Greece)	Kostas Peristeridis	12	2	14
13	GK	(Greece)	Nikolaos Koliofoukas	0	0	0
14	CF	(Greece)	Stamatis Sapalidis	7	3	10
17	LB	(Spain)	David López Nadales	26	3	29
18	DM / CM	(Greece)	Michalis Avgenikou	0	0	0
19	CM	(Greece)	Antonis Iliadis	16	5	21
20	RB	(Greece)	Nikos Karanikas	19	4	23
21	CM	(Greece)	Stavros Tsoukalas	28	5	33
22	DM	(Greece)	Chrysovalantis Kozoronis	23	2	25
23	RB	(Slovenia)	Andraž Struna	22	3	25
27	LB	(Greece) (Brazil)	Leonardo Koutris	1	0	1
33	CF	(Greece)	Michalis Manias	28	2	30
42	CB	(Greece)	Konstantinos Mavropanos	0	0	0
44	CB	(Greece)	Apostolos Skondras	14	4	18
49	CM	(Greece)	Giannis Ioannou	0	0	0
77	CF	(Greece) (Germany)	Dimitrios Ferfelis	12	4	16
88	CM / RLW	(Greece)	Alexandros Nikolias	2	1	3
98	DM	(Greece)	Alexandros Masouras	0	0	0

Super League Greece

=== Goalscorers ===
No.	Pos.	Nat.	Name	Greek Super League	Greek Cup	Total
No.	Pos.	Nat.	Name	Goals	Goals	Goals
33	CF	(Greece)	Michalis Manias	10	0	10
9	CF	(Serbia)	Brana Ilić	4	0	4
21	CM	(Greece)	Stavros Tsoukalas	4	0	4
11	CM / LW	(Spain)	Noé Acosta	3	1	4
7	CM / CF	(Greece)	Evripidis Giakos	2	1	3
10	CM	(Argentina)	Cristian Gabriel Chávez	2	1	3
8	CB	(New Zealand) (Greece)	Themistoklis Tzimopoulos	2	0	2
22	DM	(Greece)	Chrysovalantis Kozoronis	2	0	2
3	DM	(Albania)	Andi Lila	2	0	2
6	CB	(Greece)	Alexios Michail	1	0	1
14	CF	(Greece)	Stamatis Sapalidis	0	1	1
19	CM	(Greece)	Antonis Iliadis	1	0	1
44	CB	(Greece)	Apostolos Skondras	1	0	1
77	CF	(Greece) (Germany)	Dimitrios Ferfelis	0	1	1
			Own goals	2	0	2

Super League Greece

=== Clean sheets ===
No.	Pos.	Nat.	Name	Greek Super League	Greek Cup	Total
No.	Pos.	Nat.	Name	CS	CS	CS
1	GK	(Greece)	Alexandros Paschalakis	0 (0)	0 (0)	0 (0)
1	GK	(Greece)	Markos Vellidis	4 (18)	1 (3)	5 (21)
12	GK	(Greece)	Kostas Peristeridis	6 (12)	1 (2)	7 (14)
13	GK	(Greece)	Nikolaos Koliofoukas	0 (0)	0 (0)	0 (0)

=== Best goal and MVP awards winners ===
MD	MVP award	Best goal award
2	Marcos Vellidis	-
19	Michalis Manias	-

=== Disciplinary record ===
S	P	N	Name	Super League			Greek Cup			Total		
S	P	N	Name	Yellow card	Yellow-red card	Red card	Yellow card	Yellow-red card	Red card	Yellow card	Yellow-red card	Red card
1	GK	(Greece)	Markos Vellidis	1	0	0	0	0	0	1	0	0
3	DM	(Albania)	Andi Lila	7	0	0	0	0	0	7	0	0
4	CB	(Greece)	Thodoris Berios	5	0	0	1	0	0	6	0	0
5	DM / CM	(Greece)	Iraklis Garoufalias	4	0	0	1	0	0	5	0	0
6	CB	(Greece)	Alexios Michail	4	2	0	1	0	0	5	2	0
7	CM / CF	(Greece)	Evripidis Giakos	2	0	0	0	0	0	2	0	0
8	CB	(New Zealand) (Greece)	Themistoklis Tzimopoulos	5	1	0	2	0	0	7	1	0
9	CF	(Serbia)	Brana Ilić	3	0	0	0	0	0	3	0	0
10	CM	(Argentina)	Cristian Gabriel Chávez	3	0	0	0	0	0	3	0	0
11	CM / LW	(Spain)	Noé Acosta	4	0	0	0	0	0	4	0	0
12	GK	(Greece)	Kostas Peristeridis	3	0	0	1	0	0	4	0	0
14	CF	(Greece)	Stamatis Sapalidis	0	0	0	1	0	0	1	0	0
17	LB	(Spain)	David López Nadales	6	0	0	0	0	0	6	0	0
19	CM	(Greece)	Antonis Iliadis	2	0	0	0	0	0	2	0	0
20	RB	(Greece)	Nikos Karanikas	6	0	0	2	0	1	8	0	1
21	CM	(Greece)	Stavros Tsoukalas	3	0	0	1	0	0	4	0	0
22	DM	(Greece)	Chrysovalantis Kozoronis	4	0	0	0	1	0	4	1	0
23	RB	(Slovenia)	Andraž Struna	4	0	0	1	0	0	5	0	0
27	LB	(Greece) (Brazil)	Leonardo Koutris	1	0	0	0	0	0	1	0	0
33	CF	(Greece)	Michalis Manias	4	1	0	0	0	0	4	1	0
44	CB	(Greece)	Apostolos Skondras	5	0	0	1	0	0	6	0	0
77	CF	(Greece) (Germany)	Dimitrios Ferfelis	3	0	0	1	0	0	4	0	0
88	CM / RLW	(Greece)	Alexandros Nikolias	0	1	0	0	0	0	0	1	0

=== Awards ===
Nomination for Best Manager in Greece:Giannis Petrakis
