= List of Greek football transfers winter 2018–19 =

This is a list of Greek football transfers for the 2018–19 winter transfer window by club. Only transfers of clubs in the Super League and Football League are included.

The winter transfer window opened on 1 January 2019, although a few transfers took place prior to that date. The window closed at midnight on 1 February 2019. Players without a club may join one at any time, either during or in between transfer windows.

== Super League ==
=== AEK Athens ===
In:

No.	Pos.	Nation	Player
4	DF	GRE	Marios Oikonomou (from (Italy) Bologna, previously on loan)
6	MF	SRB	Nenad Krstičić (from (Serbia) Red Star Belgrade)
—	MF	BIH	Anel Šabanadžović (from (Bosnia and Herzegovina) Željezničar)

Out:

No.	Pos.	Nation	Player
6	MF	ALB	Astrit Ajdarević (released)
9	FW	GRE	Giorgos Giakoumakis (on loan to OFI)
32	MF	GRE	Paris Babis (on loan to Apollon Pontus)
39	MF	ESP	Erik Moran (on loan to (Spain) Málaga)
—	MF	BIH	Anel Šabanadžović (on loan to (Bosnia and Herzegovina) Željezničar)

=== AEL ===
In:

No.	Pos.	Nation	Player
—	MF	BIH	Adnan Šećerović (from (Bosnia and Herzegovina) Tuzla City)
—	FW	BLR	Yevgeniy Shikavka (from (Belarus) Slutsk)
—	DF	MKD	Nikola Jakimovski (from (Italy) Bisceglie)

Out:

No.	Pos.	Nation	Player
7	FW	ALG	Samy Frioui (to (Algeria) MC Alger)
17	FW	EGY	Basem Morsy (loan return to (Egypt) Zamalek)

=== Apollon Smyrnis ===
In:

No.	Pos.	Nation	Player
—	FW	GRE	Thomas Nazlidis (from Aris)

Out:

No.	Pos.	Nation	Player
7	FW	GER	Justin Eilers (released)
9	FW	GRE	Vangelis Mantzios (released)
20	MF	URU	Gonzalo González (released)
46	FW	ARG	Luis Salces (released)

=== Aris ===
In:

No.	Pos.	Nation	Player

Out:

No.	Pos.	Nation	Player
9	FW	GRE	Thomas Nazlidis (to Apollon Smyrnis)
33	DF	ALB	Mërgim Mavraj (to (Germany) FC Ingolstadt 04)

=== Asteras Tripolis ===
In:

No.	Pos.	Nation	Player

Out:

No.	Pos.	Nation	Player
—	FW	GRE	Alexis Nikolakopoulos (to Atromitos Piraeus, previously on loan at Aiginiakos)

=== Atromitos ===
In:

No.	Pos.	Nation	Player
74	MF	EGY	Amr Warda (on loan from PAOK)

Out:

No.	Pos.	Nation	Player

=== Lamia ===
In:

No.	Pos.	Nation	Player
—	MF	BOL	Danny Bejarano (from (Bolivia) Oriente Petrolero)

Out:

No.	Pos.	Nation	Player
6	MF	GHA	Abdul Osman (to (Scotland) Falkirk)

=== Levadiakos ===
In:

No.	Pos.	Nation	Player
—	DF	CIV	Benjamin Angoua (free agent)
—	GK	ROU	Dragoș Balauru (from (Romania) Daco-Getica București)

Out:

No.	Pos.	Nation	Player
3	DF	BRA	João Francisco (released)
86	MF	BRA	Chumbinho (released)

=== OFI ===
In:

No.	Pos.	Nation	Player
10	FW	GRE	Giorgos Giakoumakis (on loan from AEK Athens)
18	DF	GRE	Kostas Giannoulis (free agent)
47	DF	GER	Christopher Braun (from (Netherlands) Fortuna Sittard)
94	FW	SWE	Erik Pärsson (from (Sweden) Falkenberg)

Out:

No.	Pos.	Nation	Player

=== Olympiacos ===
In:

No.	Pos.	Nation	Player
16	MF	GRE	Georgios Masouras (from Panionios)
—	FW	ARG	Franco Soldano (from (Argentina) Unión)

Out:

No.	Pos.	Nation	Player
90	FW	COL	Felipe Pardo (to (Mexico) Toluca)

=== Panathinaikos ===
In:

No.	Pos.	Nation	Player

Out:

No.	Pos.	Nation	Player

=== Panetolikos ===
In:

No.	Pos.	Nation	Player
—	DF	POR	Pedro Amaral (on loan from (Portugal) Benfica B)
—	MF	POR	Guga (on loan from (Portugal) Benfica B)

Out:

No.	Pos.	Nation	Player

=== Panionios ===
In:

No.	Pos.	Nation	Player
19	DF	GRE	Giannis Maniatis (free agent)

Out:

No.	Pos.	Nation	Player
19	FW	GRE	Georgios Masouras (to Olympiacos)

=== PAOK ===
In:

No.	Pos.	Nation	Player
4	DF	ISL	Sverrir Ingi Ingason (from (Russia) FC Rostov)
9	FW	POL	Karol Świderski (from (Poland) Jagiellonia Białystok)
26	MF	POR	Sérgio Oliveira (on loan from (Portugal) Porto)
27	MF	CRO	Josip Mišić (on loan from (Portugal) Sporting CP)

Out:

No.	Pos.	Nation	Player
74	MF	EGY	Amr Warda (on loan to Atromitos)
99	FW	SRB	Aleksandar Prijović (to Al-Ittihad)

=== PAS Giannina ===
In:

No.	Pos.	Nation	Player
17	DF	GEO	Lasha Shergelashvili (from (Latvia) FK Rīgas Futbola Skola)
19	DF	GRE	Giannis Kargas (from (Belarus) FC Dynamo Brest)
27	FW	GRE	Dimitrios Manos (on loan from Olympiacos)
35	MF	SRB	Dušan Pantelić (from (Serbia) FK Radnik Surdulica)

Out:

No.	Pos.	Nation	Player
11	DF	MKD	Mite Cikarski (released)
15	DF	UGA	Alex Kakuba (released)
17	MF	UKR	Orest Kuzyk (on loan to (Ukraine) SC Dnipro-1)
25	FW	GRE	Giannis Loukinas (released)
27	MF	GRE	Giannis Mystakidis (loan return to PAOK)

=== Xanthi ===
In:

No.	Pos.	Nation	Player

Out:

No.	Pos.	Nation	Player

== Football League ==
=== AE Karaiskakis ===
In:

No.	Pos.	Nation	Player

Out:

No.	Pos.	Nation	Player

=== Aiginiakos ===
In:

No.	Pos.	Nation	Player
—	FW	MEX	Marco Granados (on loan from (Mexico) Guadalajara, previously on loan at (Mexico) Tuxtla)

Out:

No.	Pos.	Nation	Player
77	FW	GRE	Alexis Nikolakopoulos (loan return to Asteras Tripolis)

=== Aittitos Spata ===
In:

No.	Pos.	Nation	Player

Out:

No.	Pos.	Nation	Player

=== AO Chania Kissamikos ===
In:

No.	Pos.	Nation	Player

Out:

No.	Pos.	Nation	Player

=== Apollon Larissa ===
In:

No.	Pos.	Nation	Player

Out:

No.	Pos.	Nation	Player

=== Apollon Pontus ===
In:

No.	Pos.	Nation	Player
32	MF	GRE	Paris Babis (on loan from AEK Athens)

Out:

No.	Pos.	Nation	Player

=== Doxa Drama ===
In:

No.	Pos.	Nation	Player

Out:

No.	Pos.	Nation	Player

=== Ergotelis ===
In:

No.	Pos.	Nation	Player
88	MF	GRE	Dimitris Grontis (from Aittitos Spata)
40	GK	GRE	Georgios Tzelepis (from Xanthi)
2	DF	GRE	Konstantinos Providakis (from Irodotos)
33	DF	GRE	Giannis Koiliaras (from OFI)
22	DF	CMR	Patrick Bahanack (on loan from (France) Reims)

Out:

No.	Pos.	Nation	Player
44	MF	GRE	Chrysovalantis Kozoronis (to (Romania) Petrolul)
18	GK	GRE	Georgios Chaniotakis (to Episkopi)
77	FW	GRE	Christos Antoniou (loan return to AEK Athens)
—	FW	GRE	Georgios Lydakis (to Poros)
14	DF	GHA	Issahaku Yakubu (to (Egypt) Wadi Degla)
6	MF	GRE	Vasilios Vogiatzis (on loan to O.F. Ierapetra)
22	DF	GRE	Nikolaos Patas (to Apollon Pontus)

=== Iraklis ===
In:

No.	Pos.	Nation	Player

Out:

No.	Pos.	Nation	Player

=== Irodotos ===
In:

No.	Pos.	Nation	Player

Out:

No.	Pos.	Nation	Player

=== Kerkyra ===
In:

No.	Pos.	Nation	Player

Out:

No.	Pos.	Nation	Player

=== Panachaiki ===
In:

No.	Pos.	Nation	Player

Out:

No.	Pos.	Nation	Player

=== Platanias ===
In:

No.	Pos.	Nation	Player

Out:

No.	Pos.	Nation	Player

=== Sparti ===
In:

No.	Pos.	Nation	Player

Out:

No.	Pos.	Nation	Player

=== Trikala ===
In:

No.	Pos.	Nation	Player

Out:

No.	Pos.	Nation	Player

=== Volos ===
In:

No.	Pos.	Nation	Player

Out:

No.	Pos.	Nation	Player
