= Alexandros Paschalakis =

Greek footballer

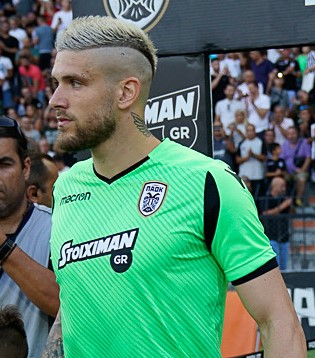
- Paschalakis playing with PAOK in 2018

Personal information
- Full name: Alexandros Paschalakis
- Date of birth: 28 July 1989 (age 37)
- Place of birth: Xanthi, Greece
- Height: 1.97 m (6 ft 5 1/2 in)
- Position: Goalkeeper

Youth career
- 2002–2003: A.O.X.
- 2003–2005: Olympiacos
- 2005–2006: Ilioupoli

Senior career*
Years	Team	Apps	(Gls)
2006–2008	Ilioupoli	0	(0)
2008–2012	Levadiakos	1	(0)
2012–2013	PAEEK	23	(0)
2014–2016	Panthrakikos	13	(0)
2016–2017	PAS Giannina	20	(0)
2017–2022	PAOK	115	(0)
2022–2026	Olympiacos	50	(0)

International career^{‡}
2019–2022	Greece	5	(0)
- * Club domestic league appearances and goals as of 28 April 2024 ‡ National team caps and goals as of 20 November 2022

Alexandros Paschalakis (Greek: Αλέξανδρος Πασχαλάκης; born 28 July 1989) is a Greek professional footballer who plays as a goalkeeper.

== Club career ==
=== Early career ===
Paschalakis started playing football at the youth team of Xanthi for a year and then at the youth team of Olympiacos for two years (2003–2005). He then moved to the team of Ilioupoli. At the age of 17 he transferred to the youth team of Galatasaray but could not sign a contract due to restrictions on the number of foreign players.

He signed for Levadiakos in the summer of 2008. He signed for PAEEK in the summer of 2012. Akhisar was interested in Paschalakis but he did not want to move there. After returning to Greece and spending six months in limbo, he signed for Panthrakikos in January 2014, but played just 13 matches until January 2016.

=== PAS Giannina ===
Paschalakis signed for PAS Giannina on 26 January 2016, to replace Markos Vellidis' transfer to PAOK. He did not play at all in his first six months in Ioannina. On 25 July 2017, the 28-year-old goalkeeper that was bound by a contract to the club until the summer of 2018, had made an appeal due to a delay in his annual salary. The Athenian goalie had an outstanding season playing in 27 games, four of which were in the UEFA Europa League. PAOK, along with Asteras Tripolis and Panathinaikos expressed interest in his acquisition, having nine clean sheets. On 1 August, Paschalakis was released from PAS Giannina.

=== PAOK ===
On 7 August 2017, he signed a year contract with PAOK for an undisclosed fee. On 2 December 2017, he made his debut in a 3–0 away win against Xanthi. A day later he renewed his contract with the club till the summer of 2020. The 28-year-old goalkeeper increased his earnings and the release clause would be set in the region of €5 million.

It was initially planned that he would be back-up to Argentinian Rodrigo Rey, but since head coach Răzvan Lucescu gave him a chance, Paschalakis made himself PAOK's starter. As of 4 February 2018, Paschalakis holds PAOK's record for most consecutive minutes without conceding, with 971 excluding stoppage time (1008 in total), before conceding in a 1–3 away win over PAS Giannina, to surpass current runner-up Kostas Chalkias with 859 min. Unsurprisingly, PAOK boast the Super League's tightest defence with seven goals conceded in nineteen matches, a statistic which is largely down to Paschalakis' superb performances between the sticks.

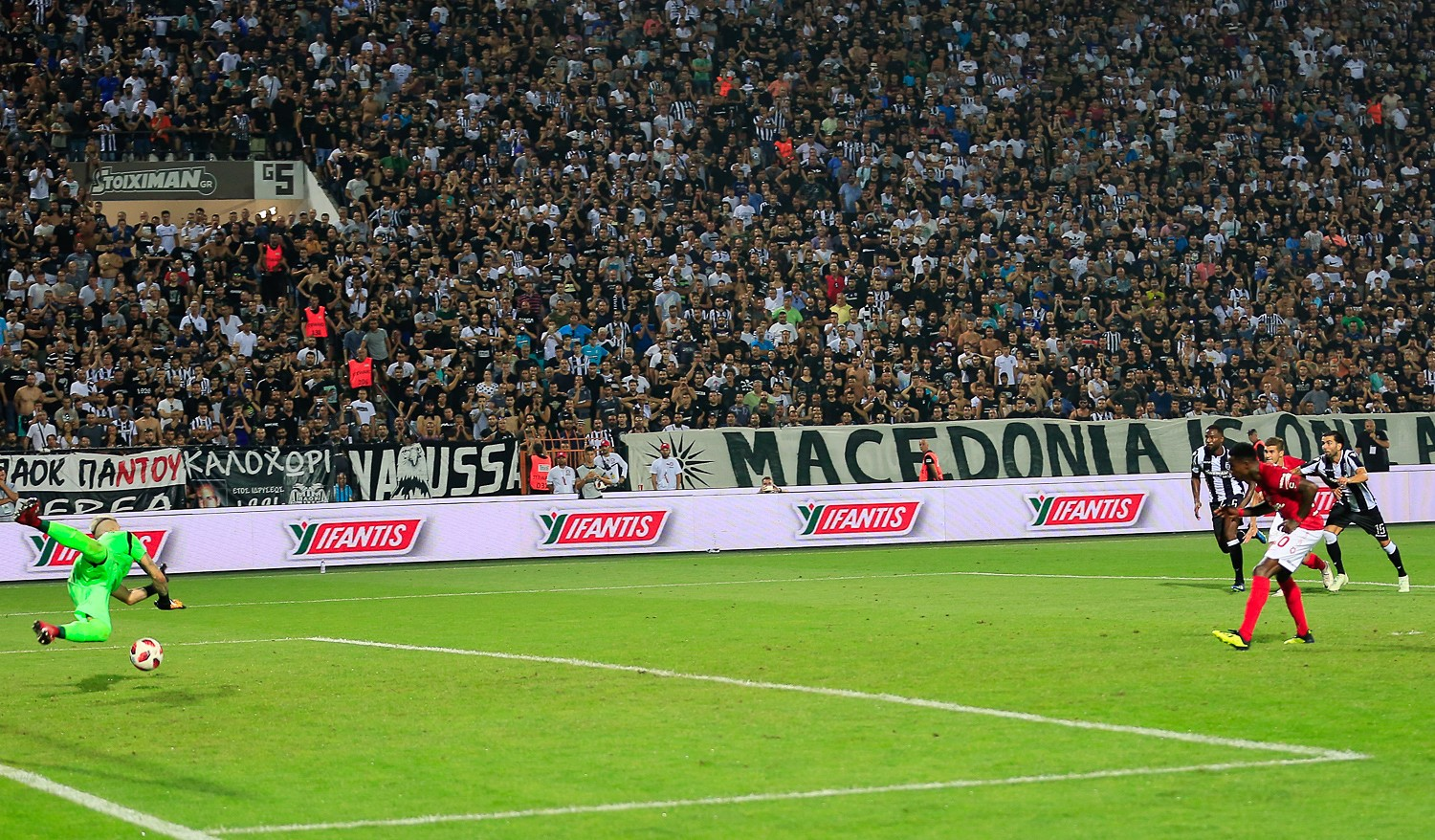
Paschalakis saving Quincy Promes's penalty against Spartak Moscow in 2018.

On 8 August 2018, Paschalakis saved second-half Quincy Promes's penalty in a 3–2 home win in the UEFA Champions League Third qualifying round, 1st leg against Spartak Moscow, helping his team to maintain the win. At the first half of the 2018–19 season Paschalakis played every minute of domestic championship action, conceding a mere six goals in 15 matches while tallying an impressive nine clean sheets. On 17 January 2019, Paschalakis was awarded a new contract with PAOK through to 2022.

On 25 April 2019, he made a number of saves in a semi-final second leg Greek Cup game against Asteras Tripolis, helping PAOK's title defence of the Greek Cup, as the newly crowned Super League champions secured a 0–0 draw in Tripoli to progress 2–0 on aggregate. PAOK, for the third consecutive season, faced AEK Athens in the Greek Cup final.

=== Olympiacos ===
On 29 September 2022, Paschalakis signed for Olympiacos for an undisclosed fee. He made his debut on 13 October 2022 in the UEFA Europa League against Qarabag FK keeping a clean sheet in a 0–0 draw. On 27 October 2022, he made another appearance against SC Freiburg, making a number of crucial saves resulting in a 1–1 draw.

On 31 August 2023, Paschalakis kept a clean sheet in a 3–0 victory over Serbian club FK Čukarički in the UEFA Europa League play-off round, securing qualification for Olympiacos to the group stage. During the 2023–24 season, Olympiacos entered the UEFA Europa Conference League from the group stage with Paschalakis featuring in both legs of the play-off round against Hungarian side Ferencvárosi TC, keeping clean sheets in both matches as Olympiacos advanced to the next stage of the competition.

On 7 March 2024, Paschalakis started in Olympiacos's 1–4 home defeat to Maccabi Tel Aviv in the first leg of the round of 16 of the UEFA Europa Conference League. For the second leg, head coach José Luis Mendilibar replaced him with Konstantinos Tzolakis as the starting goalkeeper. Olympiacos ultimately won their first European title by defeating Fiorentina 1–0 after extra time in the historic 2024 UEFA Europa Conference League final, with Paschalakis being a substitute, with Konstantinos Tzolakis starting as goalkeeper.

On 30 January 2025, Paschalakis started in a 3–0 victory against Qarabağ FK, keeping a clean sheet and helping secure qualification for the knockout stages. He played an instrumental role for Olympiacos securing the double, serving as a regular starter in key matches against Panathinaikos and AEK Athens in the Greek Football Cup. On 17 May 2025, Paschalakis started in the final, a 2–0 victory over OFI.

== International career ==
On 5 October 2018 Greece coach Michael Skibbe called up Paschalakis for upcoming 2018–19 UEFA Nations League matches against Hungary and Finland in the UEFA Nations League. "All players dream of someday representing their country and I am happy for this opportunity. I waited for a long time for this call," said Paschalakis. On 30 May 2019, he made his debut in a 2–1 friendly game away loss against Turkey.

== Personal life ==
Paschalakis hails from Serres. He was in a relationship with Greek singer Irene Papadopoulou from 2019 to 2023.

== Career statistics ==
As of match played 17 September 2025

Club	Season	League			National cup (Note: Includes Cypriot Cup, Greek Football Cup)		Europe		Total	
Club	Season	Division	Apps	Goals	Apps	Goals	Apps	Goals	Apps	Goals
Levadiakos	2010–11	Football League	1	0	—		—		1	0
Levadiakos	2011–12	Super League Greece	–		–		—		—	
PAEEK	2012–13	Cypriot Second Division	23	0	2	0	—		25	0
Panthrakikos	2013–14	Super League Greece	5	0	—		—		5	0
Panthrakikos	2014–15	Super League Greece	4	0	3	0	—		7	0
Panthrakikos	2015–16	Super League Greece	4	0	2	0	—		6	0
Panthrakikos	Total		13	0	5	0	—		18	0
PAS Giannina	2015–16	Super League Greece	—		—		—		—	
PAS Giannina	2016–17	Super League Greece	20	0	3	0	4 (Note: Appearances in UEFA Europa League)	0	27	0
PAOK	2017–18	Super League Greece	17	0	7	0	0	0	24	0
PAOK	2018–19	Super League Greece	30	0	7	0	12 (Note: Six appearances in UEFA Champions League, six appearances in UEFA Europa League)	0	49	0
PAOK	2019–20	Super League Greece	16	0	6	0	4 (Note: Two appearances in UEFA Champions League, two appearances in UEFA Europa League)	0	26	0
PAOK	2020–21	Super League Greece	18	0	6	0	1	0	35	0
PAOK	2021–22	Super League Greece	34	0	4	0	16 (Note: Appearances in UEFA Conference League)	0	54	0
PAOK	Total		115	0	30	0	33	0	178	0
Olympiacos	2022–23	Super League Greece	24	0	1	0	2	0	27	0
Olympiacos	2023–24	Super League Greece	26	0	2	0	13 (Note: Ten appearances in UEFA Europa League, three appearances in UEFA Conference League)	0	41	0
Olympiacos	2024–25	Super League Greece	0	0	7	0	0	0	7	0
Olympiacos	2025–26	Super League Greece	0	0	2	0	1 (Note: Appearances in UEFA Champions League)	0	3	0
Olympiacos	Total		50	0	12	0	16	0	78	0
Career total			222	0	52	0	53	0	327	0

== Honours ==
=== Club ===
PAOK

- Super League Greece: 2018–19
- Greek Football Cup: 2017–18, 2018–19, 2020–21; runner-up: 2021–22

Olympiacos

- UEFA Conference League: 2023–24
- Super League Greece: 2024–25
- Greek Football Cup: 2024–25
- Greek Super Cup: 2025

=== Individual ===
- Super League Greece Goalkeeper of the Season: 2018–19
- Super League Greece Team of the Season: 2018–19
