= Yevhen Isayenko =

Ukrainian footballer

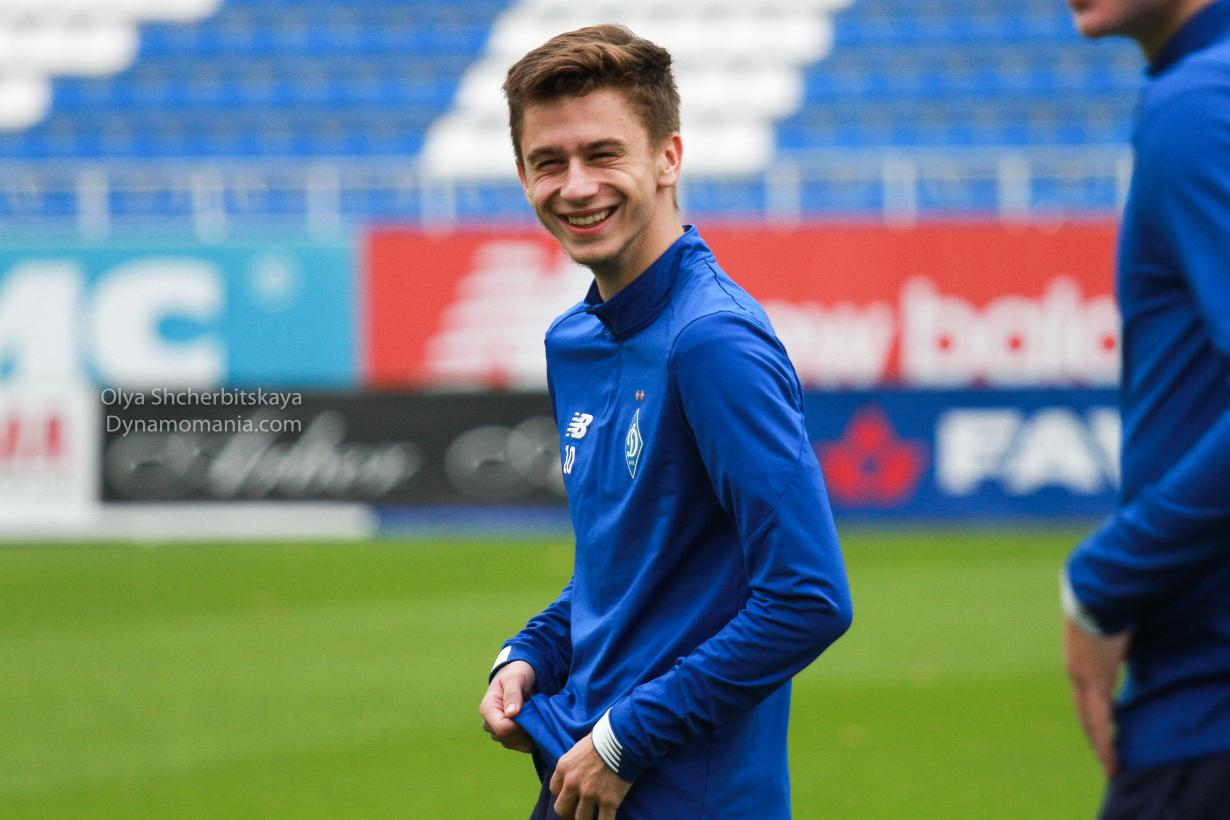

Personal information
- Full name: Yevhen Yuriyovych Isayenko
- Date of birth: 7 August 2000 (age 26)
- Place of birth: Vinnytsia, Ukraine
- Height: 1.69 m (5 ft 7 in)
- Position: Striker

Team information
- Current team: Metalist Kharkiv
- Number: 27

Youth career
- 2012–2014: Youth Sportive School Vinnytsia
- 2014–2018: Dynamo Kyiv

Senior career*
Years	Team	Apps	(Gls)
2018–2023	Dynamo Kyiv	2	(0)
2020–2021	→ Kolos Kovalivka (loan)	15	(1)
2021	→ Chornomorets Odesa (loan)	18	(2)
2022–2023	→ Kolos Kovalivka (loan)	19	(0)
2023–	Metalist Kharkiv	66	(6)

International career^{‡}
2016	Ukraine U16	3	(1)
2016–2017	Ukraine U17	10	(0)
2018	Ukraine U19	7	(3)
2020–2021	Ukraine U21	5	(1)
- * Club domestic league appearances and goals as of 4 June 2026 ‡ National team caps and goals as of 13 September 2023

Yevhen Yuriyovych Isayenko (Ukrainian: Євген Юрійович Ісаєнко; born 7 August 2000) is a Ukrainian professional footballer who plays as a striker for Metalist Kharkiv.

== Career ==
Isayenko is a product of the Vinnytsia and Dynamo Kyiv youth systems. His first trainer was Vitaliy Khmelnytskyi.

He made his debut in the Ukrainian Premier League for Dynamo on 13 April 2019 as a substitute against FC Mariupol.

=== Chornomorets Odesa ===
In July 2021 he moved on loan to Chornomorets Odesa. On 25 July he made his league debut against Desna Chernihiv at the Chernihiv Stadium.

== Honours ==
Individual

- Top scorer: 2017–18 Ukrainian Premier League U-19 competitions
