= Georgios Pamlidis =

Greek footballer

Giorgos Pamlidis
Personal information
- Full name: Georgios Pamlidis
- Date of birth: 13 November 1993 (age 32)
- Place of birth: Katerini, Greece
- Height: 1.79 m (5 ft 10 1/2 in)
- Position: Forward

Team information
- Current team: Niki Volos
- Number: 14

Youth career
- 2012: Thermaikos Korinos

Senior career*
Years	Team	Apps	(Gls)
2013–2014	Achilleas Neokaisareia	17	(12)
2014–2016	Ergotelis	27	(3)
2015	→ AEL (loan)	5	(0)
2016–2018	Kerkyra	44	(5)
2018–2021	PAS Giannina	67	(15)
2021–2022	Apollon Smyrnis	25	(3)
2022–2024	PAS Giannina	55	(9)
2024–2026	Aris	0	(0)
2024–2026	→ Kalamata (loan)	47	(17)
2026–	Niki Volos	0	(0)
- * Club domestic league appearances and goals as of 27 June 2026

Georgios Pamlidis (Greek: Γεώργιος Παμλίδης; born 13 November 1993) is a Greek professional footballer who plays as a forward for Super League 2 club Niki Volos.

== Career ==
=== Thermaikos Korinos ===
Pamlidis started his career from a local amateur team from Pieria, Thermaikos of Korinos.

=== Achilleas Neokaisareia ===
On 28 August 2013, he signed for Footaball League 2 club Achilleas Neokaisareia.

=== Ergotelis ===
After 1 year, he gained the attention of Super League club Ergotelis and, within a month's trial, he signed a 5-years contract with the Cretan team.

==== Loan to AEL ====
On 30 January 2015, he was given on loan to AEL until the end of the 2014–15 season.

=== Kerkyra ===
On 28 December 2015, Pamlidis reportedly signed for Football League side Kerkyra, after legally filing for his contract with Ergotelis to be terminated, due to unpaid wages. He was officially announced by Kerkyra on 7 January 2016.

=== Apollon Smyrnis ===
On 5 July 2021, Greek Super League club Apollon Smyrnis announced Pamlidis had signed a contract with the club, with the duration of the contract and the shirt number not being disclosed.

== Career statistics ==
As of 2 April 2026

Club	Season	League			Cup		Continental		Other		Total	
Club	Season	Division	Apps	Goals	Apps	Goals	Apps	Goals	Apps	Goals	Apps	Goals
Ergotelis	2014–15	Super League Greece	14	0	1	0	—		—		15	0
Ergotelis	2016–17	Football League	13	3	0	0	—		—		13	3
Ergotelis	Total		27	3	1	0	—		—		28	3
AEL (loan)	2014–15	Football League	5	0	—		—		—		5	0
Kerkyra	2015–16	Football League	15	1	—		—		—		15	1
Kerkyra	2016–17	Super League Greece	6	1	1	0	—		—		7	1
Kerkyra	2017–18	Super League Greece	23	3	0	0	—		—		23	3
Kerkyra	Total		49	5	1	0	—		—		50	5
PAS Giannina	2018–19	Super League Greece	15	0	4	0	—		—		19	0
PAS Giannina	2019–20	Super League Greece 2	19	8	5	4	—		—		24	12
PAS Giannina	2020–21	Super League Greece	33	7	5	1	—		—		38	8
PAS Giannina	Total		67	15	14	5	—		—		81	20
Apollon Smyrnis	2021–22	Super League Greece	25	3	1	0	—		—		26	3
PAS Giannina	2022–23	Super League Greece	28	6	1	0	—		—		29	6
PAS Giannina	2023–24	Super League Greece	27	3	1	0	—		—		28	3
PAS Giannina	Total		55	9	2	0	—		—		57	9
Kalamata (loan)	2024–25	Super League Greece 2	26	6	2	1	—		—		28	7
Kalamata (loan)	2025–26	Super League Greece 2	21	11	1	1	—		1	0	23	12
Kalamata (loan)	Total		47	17	3	2	—		—		51	19
Career total			270	52	22	7	0	0	1	0	294	59

== Honours ==
=== Club ===
PAS Giannina

- Super League 2: 2019–20

=== Individual ===
- Top Scorer of Greek Cup: 2019–20
