= Vladyslav Naumets =

Ukrainian footballer

Personal information
- Full name: Vladylsav Olehovych Naumets
- Date of birth: 7 March 1999 (age 27)
- Place of birth: Zhytomyr, Ukraine
- Height: 1.70 m (5 ft 7 in)
- Position: Winger

Team information
- Current team: Zhenis
- Number: 9

Youth career
- 2007–2014: Zorya Luhansk
- 2014–2018: Dynamo Kyiv

Senior career*
| Years | Team | Apps | (Gls) |
| 2018–2021 | PAS Giannina | 32 | (4) |
| 2022 | Mynai | 0 | (0) |
| 2022–2023 | Chornomorets Odesa | 13 | (0) |
| 2023 | Metalist Kharkiv | 15 | (1) |
| 2023–2025 | LNZ Cherkasy | 43 | (6) |
| 2025–2026 | Ordabasy | 21 | (1) |
| 2026– | Zhenis | 16 | (1) |

International career
| 2014–2015 | Ukraine U16 | 8 | (0) |
| 2015–2016 | Ukraine U17 | 14 | (2) |
| 2016–2017 | Ukraine U18 | 2 | (0) |
- * Club domestic league appearances and goals as of 1 November 2026

Vladyslav Olehovych Naumets (Ukrainian: Владислав Олегович Наумець; born 7 March 1999) is a Ukrainian professional footballer who plays as a winger for Zhenis.

== Youth career ==
Naumets started his career from the academies of FC Zorya Luhansk and FC Dynamo Kyiv, winning the 2017–18 Ukrainian Premier League Under-21 and Under-19 with the latter.

== Club career ==
=== PAS Giannina ===
Naumets signed for PAS Giannina a club in the city of Ioannina in 2018. In the season 2019–20 with the club won the Football League and got promoted to the Super League Greece. On 3 February 2021 he scored his first goal in the Greek Cup opening the score for the 2–3 victory against Atromitos. He played also against Panathinaikos where he got into the semi-final of 2020–21 Greek Cup, where he played at home and away rounds.

=== Mynai ===
In February 2022, after three years in Greece, he returned to Ukraine and he signed for Mynai a team in Ukrainian Premier League.

=== Chornomorets Odesa ===
In July 2022 he moved to Chornomorets Odesa. In February 2023 he left the club with mutual agreement.

=== Metalist Kharkiv ===
In March 2023 he signed for Metalist Kharkiv. On 15 April 2023 he scored his first goal in Ukrainian Premier League with the new club against Veres Rivne.

=== LNZ Cherkasy ===
In summer 2023 he moved to LNZ Cherkasy in Ukrainian Premier League. In summer 2025 his contract with the club was terminated and it wasn't extended.

=== Ordabasy ===
On 29 June 2025 he moved to Ordabasy in Kazakhstan Premier League.

== International career ==
In 2014 he was called up by the Ukraine under-16 and made eight appearances. In 2015 he played 14 matches for Ukraine's under-17s, scoring two goals. The following year, he was called up to the Ukraine under-18 side and made two appearances.

== Career statistics ==
=== Club ===
As of 24 July 2025

Appearances and goals by club, season and competition
| Club | Season | League | | | Cup | | Continental | | Other | | Total | |
| Club | Season | Division | Apps | Goals | Apps | Goals | Apps | Goals | Apps | Goals | Apps | Goals |
|---|---|---|---|---|---|---|---|---|---|---|---|---|
| PAS Giannina | 2018–19 | Super League Greece | 3 | 0 | 3 | 0 | — | | — | | 6 | 0 |
| PAS Giannina | 2019–20 | Super League Greece 2 | 12 | 3 | 3 | 1 | — | | — | | 15 | 4 |
| PAS Giannina | 2020–21 | Super League Greece | 17 | 1 | 4 | 1 | — | | — | | 21 | 2 |
| PAS Giannina | Total | | 32 | 4 | 10 | 2 | 0 | 0 | — | | 42 | 6 |
| Mynai | 2021–22 | Ukrainian Premier League | 0 | 0 | 0 | 0 | 0 | 0 | 0 | 0 | 0 | 0 |
| Chornomorets Odesa | 2022-23 | Ukrainian Premier League | 13 | 0 | 0 | 0 | 0 | 0 | 0 | 0 | 13 | 0 |
| Metalist Kharkiv | 2022-23 | Ukrainian Premier League | 15 | 1 | 0 | 0 | 0 | 0 | 0 | 0 | 15 | 1 |
| LNZ Cherkasy | 2023-24 | Ukrainian Premier League | 27 | 5 | 0 | 0 | 0 | 0 | 0 | 0 | 27 | 5 |
| LNZ Cherkasy | 2024-25 | Ukrainian Premier League | 14 | 1 | 1 | 0 | 0 | 0 | 0 | 0 | 15 | 1 |
| Ordabasy | 2025-26 | Kazakhstan Premier League | 3 | 0 | 0 | 0 | 2 (Note: Appearance in UEFA Conference League) | 0 | 0 | 0 | 5 | 0 |
| Career total | | | 104 | 11 | 11 | 2 | 2 | 0 | 0 | 0 | 117 | 13 |

=== International ===
As of match played 16 February 2022

Appearances and goals by national team and year
| National team | Year | Apps | Goals |
|---|---|---|---|
Ukraine U18
| Ukraine U18 | 2016-2017 | 2 | 0 |
| Total | | 2 | 0 |

Appearances and goals by national team and year
| National team | Year | Apps | Goals |
|---|---|---|---|
Ukraine U17
| Ukraine U17 | 2015-2016 | 14 | 2 |
| Total | | 14 | 2 |

Appearances and goals by national team and year
| National team | Year | Apps | Goals |
|---|---|---|---|
Ukraine U16
| Ukraine U16 | 2014-2015 | 8 | 0 |
| Total | | 8 | 0 |

== Honours ==
PAS Giannina

- Super League Greece 2: 2019–20

Dynamo Kyiv U21

- Ukrainian youth championship: 2017–18

Individual

- Top Scorer Ukrainian Premier League Reserves and Under 21: Runner up 2017–18 (11 goals).
