= 2017–18 Ukrainian Premier League Under-21 and Under-19 =

Ukrainian Premier League Reserves
- Season: 2017–18
- Top goalscorer: 16 – Boryachuk (Shakhtar)

The 2017–18 Ukrainian Premier League Reserves and Under 19 season were competitions between the reserves of Ukrainian Premier League Clubs and the Under 19s.

The events in the senior leagues during the 2016–17 season saw Dnipro Reserves and Volyn Lutsk Reserves be relegated with Veres RivneReserves and Mariupol Reserves entering the competition.

== Teams ==
Entering	Replaced
FC Mariupol reserves Veres Rivne reserves	Volyn Lutsk reserves Dnipro reserves

== Under 21 competition ==
=== Standings ===
Pos	Team	Pld	W	D	L	GF	GA	GD	Pts
1	Shakhtar Donetsk reserves	32	19	7	6	68	21	+47	64
2	Dynamo Kyiv reserves	32	18	8	6	82	33	+49	62
3	Oleksandriya reserves	32	14	11	7	38	29	+9	53
4	Karpaty Lviv reserves	32	14	9	9	56	40	+16	51
5	Mariupol reserves	32	15	6	11	54	49	+5	51
6	Vorskla Poltava reserves	32	12	10	10	39	40	−1	46
7	Zorya Luhansk reserves	32	15	8	9	51	38	+13	53
8	Chornomorets Odesa reserves	32	13	5	14	53	51	+2	44
9	Olimpik Donetsk reserves	32	10	6	16	46	56	−10	36
10	Veres Rivne reserves	32	6	9	17	31	60	−29	27
11	Stal Kamianske reserves	32	5	8	19	34	83	−49	23
12	Zirka Kropyvnytskyi reserves	32	5	5	22	30	82	−52	20

Source: Ukrainian Premier League website (in Ukrainian)
Rules for classification: 1) points; 2) goal difference; 3) number of goals scored. Relegation is dependent on senior club

=== Top scorers ===
Scorer	Goals (Pen.)	Team
(Ukraine) Bohdan Lyednyev	16 (2)	Dynamo Kyiv Reserves
(Ukraine) Nazariy Rusyn	15	Dynamo Kyiv Reserves
(Ukraine) Vladyslav Buhay	15 (4)	Mariupol Reserves
(Ukraine) Yuriy Hlushchuk	11	Vorskla Poltava Reserves
(Ukraine) Andriy Shtohrin	11	Chornomorets Odesa Reserves
(Ukraine) Yevhen Smyrnyi	10	Dynamo Kyiv Reserves
(Ukraine) Akhmed Alibekov	10 (2)	Dynamo Kyiv Reserves
(Ukraine) Vadym Hranchar	9	Oleksandriya Reserves
(Ukraine) Oleksiy Kashchuk	8	Shakhtar Donetsk Reserves
(Georgia (country)) Giorgi Arabidze	8 (2)	Shakhtar Donetsk Reserves
(Ukraine) Vladyslav Vakula	8 (4)	Stal Kamianske Reserves

== Under 19 competition ==
=== Standings ===
Pos	Team	Pld	W	D	L	GF	GA	GD	Pts
1	Dynamo Kyiv reserves	26	20	2	4	76	25	+51	62
2	Shakhtar Donetsk reserves	26	18	2	6	74	26	+48	56
3	Karpaty Lviv reserves	26	17	5	4	53	23	+30	56
4	Veres Rivne reserves	26	14	6	6	49	32	+17	48
5	Zorya Luhansk reserves	26	13	6	7	44	36	+8	45
6	Chornomorets Odesa reserves	26	11	6	9	40	33	+7	39
7	Mariupol reserves	26	8	8	10	38	50	−12	32
8	Vorskla Poltava reserves	26	7	9	10	22	29	−7	30
9	Oleksandriya reserves	26	7	7	12	29	40	−11	28
10	Olimpik Donetsk reserves	26	7	6	13	25	38	−13	27
11	Skala Stryi reserves	26	7	6	13	31	48	−17	27
12	Arsenal Kyiv reserves	26	4	7	15	35	61	−26	19
13	Stal Kamianske reserves	26	5	4	17	30	62	−32	19
14	Zirka Kropyvnytskyi reserves	26	4	6	16	16	59	−43	18

Source: Ukrainian Premier League website (in Ukrainian)
Rules for classification: 1) points; 2) goal difference; 3) number of goals scored. Relegation is dependent on senior club

=== Top scorers ===
Scorer	Goals (Pen.)	Team
(Ukraine) Yevhen Isayenko	17 (2)	Dynamo Kyiv Reserves
(Ukraine) Vladyslav Kuzmenko	11	Shakhtar Donetsk Reserves
(Ukraine) Vladyslav Naumets	11 (1)	Dynamo Kyiv Reserves
(Ukraine) Oleksiy Kashchuk	11 (5)	Shakhtar Donetsk Reserves
(Ukraine) Artur Remenyak	10	Veres Rivne Reserves
(Ukraine) Bohdan Sablin	10	Chornomorets Odesa Reserves
(Ukraine) Oleh Horin	10 (1)	Veres Rivne Reserves
(Ukraine) Artur Murza	10 (4)	Mariupol Reserves

== See also ==
- 2017–18 Ukrainian Premier League
