= Santa Bárbara, Santander =

Coordinates: 6°59′25″N 72°54′24″W

Santa Bárbara
- Municipality and town
- Flag

- Location of the municipality and town of Santa Bárbara in the Santander Department of Colombia.
- Country: Colombia
- Department: Santander Department
- Time zone: UTC-5 (Colombia Standard Time)

Santa Bárbara is a town and municipality in the Santander Department in northeastern Colombia.
