= Alexandros Masouras =

Greek footballer

Personal information
- Date of birth: 21 March 1998 (age 28)
- Place of birth: Ioannina, Greece
- Height: 1.85 m (6 ft 1 in)
- Position: Defensive midfielder

Team information
- Current team: Diagoras
- Number: 18

Youth career
- 2008–2013: Elpides Ioannina
- 2013–2015: PAS Giannina

Senior career*
Years	Team	Apps	(Gls)
2015–2017	PAS Giannina	0	(0)
2017–2018	Anagennisi Karditsa	5	(0)
2018	Apollon Paralimnio	1	(0)
2018–2020	Karaiskakis	34	(1)
2020–2021	Diagoras	24	(0)
2021–2022	Chania	15	(0)
2022–	Veria	18	(1)
- Diagoras

International career^{‡}
2017	Greece U17	2	(0)
- * Club domestic league appearances and goals as of 16 June 2023 ‡ National team caps and goals as of 12 February 2015

Alexandros Masouras (Greek: Αλέξανδρος Μασούρας; born 21 March 1998) is a Greek professional footballer who plays as a defensive midfielder for Diagoras.

== Career ==
=== PAS Giannina ===
In August 2015, Masouras signed his first professional contract with PAS Giannina. He made only two appearances on the Greek Cup against Agrotikos Asteras and AEL Kalloni. He released free from PAS Giannina on summer 2017.
