= Orest Kuzyk =

Ukrainian association football player

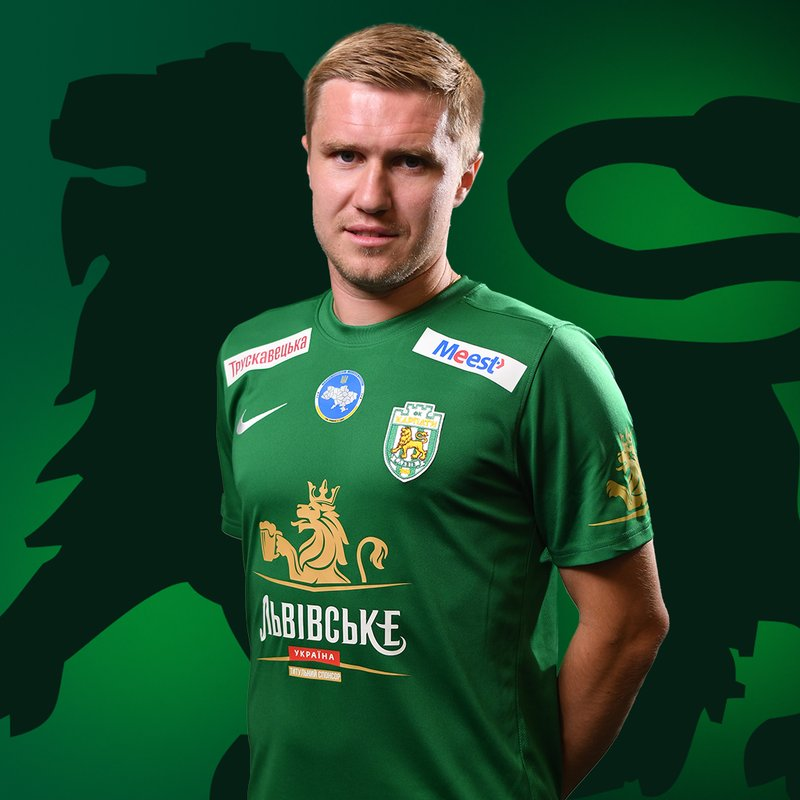

Personal information
- Full name: Orest Tarasovych Kuzyk
- Date of birth: 17 May 1995 (age 31)
- Place of birth: Lviv, Ukraine
- Height: 1.74 m (5 ft 9 in)
- Position: Winger

Youth career
- 2001–2010: Karpaty Lviv
- 2011–2012: Dynamo Kyiv

Senior career*
| Years | Team | Apps | (Gls) |
| 2012–2016 | Dynamo Kyiv | 0 | (0) |
| 2015–2016 | → Hoverla Uzhhorod (loan) | 24 | (2) |
| 2016–2018 | Stal Kamianske | 37 | (8) |
| 2018–2020 | PAS Giannina | 7 | (0) |
| 2019 | → Dnipro-1 (loan) | 11 | (4) |
| 2019–2020 | → Desna Chernihiv (loan) | 20 | (1) |
| 2020–2021 | Pafos | 12 | (1) |
| 2021–2022 | Rukh Lviv | 9 | (1) |
| 2022–2024 | Chornomorets Odesa | 53 | (6) |
| 2024–2025 | Karpaty Lviv | 7 | (0) |

International career^{‡}
| 2010–2011 | Ukraine U16 | 4 | (0) |
| 2010–2011 | Ukraine U17 | 4 | (0) |
| 2015 | Ukraine U20 | 2 | (0) |
| 2016 | Ukraine U21 | 5 | (1) |
- * Club domestic league appearances and goals as of 4 November 2025 ‡ National team caps and goals as of 24 June 2021

Orest Tarasovych Kuzyk (Ukrainian: Орест Тарасович Кузик; born 17 May 1995) is a Ukrainian professional footballer who plays as a winger.

== Club career ==
=== Dynamo Kyiv and loan to Hoverla Uzhhorod ===
He spent most of his early career in the Ukrainian Premier League Reserves with Dynamo Kyiv. In July 2015, he went on loan to Hoverla Uzhhorod in the Ukrainian Premier League, making his debut against FC Vorskla Poltava on 25 July.

=== FC Stal Kamianske ===
The following season, Kuzyk joined Stal Kamianske of the Ukrainian Premier League, appearing 37 times and scoring eight goals over two seasons.

=== PAS Giannina F.C. ===
On 8 June 2018, Kuzyk signed with Greek Super League side PAS Giannina.

=== Loan to SC Dnipro-1 ===
Having made only seven appearances for Giannina, Kuzyk was loaned out to SC Dnipro-1 in the Ukrainian First League on 14 January 2019. He made 11 appearances and scored four goals in the 2018–19 Ukrainian First League, winning Player of the Month honours in March and ultimately helping Dnipro earn promotion to the Ukrainian Premier League.

=== Loan to FC Desna Chernihiv ===
On 14 July 2019, Kuzyk was loaned to Desna Chernihiv, where he secured more regular playtime, featuring in 21 matches and netting a single goal during the 2019–20 Ukrainian Premier League season.

=== Pafos FC ===
In September 2020, Kuzyk left Giannina and signed a three-year contract with Pafos in the Cypriot First Division. On 22 October, he scored his first goal for the side against Karmiotissa FC.

=== Rukh Lviv ===
On 24 June 2021, Kuzyk signed a three-year contract with Rukh Lviv in Ukrainian Premier League. He made his debut for the club on 25 July against Metalist 1925 Kharkiv, where he also scored his first goal.

=== Chornomorets Odesa ===
On 26 January 2022, he moved to Chornomorets Odesa in the Ukrainian Premier League.

=== Karpaty Lviv ===
In summer 2024 he moved to Karpaty Lviv in Ukrainian Premier League. On 25 June 2025 his contract wasn't extended.

== International career ==
In 2015, he made two appearances for Ukraine's under-20 team. The next year, he appeared five times and scored one goal for the Ukraine under-21 team.

== Career statistics ==
=== Club ===
As of match played 4 November 2025

Appearances and goals by club, season and competition
| Club | Season | League | | | Cup | | Europe | | Other | | Total | |
| Club | Season | Division | Apps | Goals | Apps | Goals | Apps | Goals | Apps | Goals | Apps | Goals |
|---|---|---|---|---|---|---|---|---|---|---|---|---|
| Dynamo Kyiv | 2015–16 | Ukrainian Premier League | 0 | 0 | 0 | 0 | 0 | 0 | 0 | 0 | 0 | 0 |
| Hoverla Uzhhorod (loan) | 2015–16 | Ukrainian Premier League | 24 | 2 | 1 | 0 | 0 | 0 | 0 | 0 | 25 | 2 |
| Stal Kamianske | 2016–17 | Ukrainian Premier League | 5 | 0 | 1 | 0 | 0 | 0 | 0 | 0 | 6 | 0 |
| Stal Kamianske | 2017–18 | Ukrainian Premier League | 32 | 8 | 2 | 0 | 0 | 0 | 0 | 0 | 34 | 8 |
| PAS Giannina | 2018–19 | Super League Greece | 4 | 0 | 3 | 0 | 0 | 0 | 0 | 0 | 7 | 0 |
| Dnipro-1 (loan) | 2018–19 | Ukrainian First League | 11 | 4 | 2 | 0 | 0 | 0 | 0 | 0 | 13 | 4 |
| Desna Chernihiv (loan) | 2019–20 | Ukrainian Premier League | 20 | 1 | 1 | 0 | 0 | 0 | 0 | 0 | 21 | 1 |
| Pafos | 2020–21 | Cypriot First Division | 12 | 1 | 0 | 0 | 0 | 0 | 0 | 0 | 12 | 1 |
| Rukh Lviv | 2021–22 | Ukrainian Premier League | 9 | 1 | 2 | 0 | 0 | 0 | 0 | 0 | 11 | 1 |
| Chornomorets Odesa | 2021–22 | Ukrainian Premier League | 0 | 0 | 0 | 0 | 0 | 0 | 0 | 0 | 0 | 0 |
| Chornomorets Odesa | 2022–23 | Ukrainian Premier League | 26 | 1 | 0 | 0 | 0 | 0 | 0 | 0 | 26 | 1 |
| Karpaty Lviv | 2024–25 | Ukrainian Premier League | 7 | 0 | 1 | 0 | 0 | 0 | 0 | 0 | 8 | 0 |
| Career total | | | 150 | 18 | 13 | 0 | 0 | 0 | 0 | 0 | 163 | 18 |

== Honours ==
SC Dnipro-1

- Ukrainian First League: 2018-19

individual

- Best Player in March 2019 Ukrainian First League: 2018–19
