= Georgios Vakrakos =

Greek footballer

Personal information
- Full name: Georgios Vakrakos
- Date of birth: 18 October 1997 (age 29)
- Place of birth: Agrinio, Greece
- Height: 1.87 m (6 ft 2 in)
- Position: Forward

Team information
- Current team: Ao Pyliou
- Number: 97

Youth career
- 2013–2016: Panetolikos

Senior career*
Years	Team	Apps	(Gls)
2016–2019	Panetolikos	7	(0)
2019	Nafpaktiakos Asteras	5	(0)
2019–2020	Irodotos	15	(5)
2020–	Ierapetra	4	(0)
- * Club domestic league appearances and goals as of 31 August 2020

Georgios Vakrakos (Greek: Γεώργιος Βακράκος; born 18 October 1997) is a Greek professional footballer who plays as a forward for Football League 2 club Ao Pyliou.

== Career ==
=== Panetolikos ===
Vakrakos signed his first professional contract in July 2016.

He made his Super League debut on 30 April 2017 in a match against Olympiacos.
