= Alex Kakuba =

Ugandan footballer (born 1991)

Personal information
- Date of birth: 12 June 1991 (age 35)
- Place of birth: Kampala, Uganda
- Height: 1.77 m (5 ft 9 1/2 in)
- Position: Left back

Team information
- Current team: Cova Piedade
- Number: 3

Youth career
- 2009–2010: Mamelodi Sundowns

Senior career*
Years	Team	Apps	(Gls)
2010–2012	Proline		
2011	→ Águeda (loan)		
2012–2013	Esperança de Lagos	10	(0)
2013–2014	Covilhã	50	(1)
2014–2018	Estoril	9	(0)
2016–2018	→ Feirense (loan)	33	(0)
2018	PAS Giannina	5	(0)
2019	Lori	10	(0)
2019–	Cova Piedade	23	(0)

International career^{‡}
2013–	Uganda	4	(0)
- * Club domestic league appearances and goals as of 18:07, 16 October 2020 (UTC) ‡ National team caps and goals as of 27 March 2018

Alex Kakuba (born 12 June 1991) is a Ugandan professional footballer who currently plays for C.D. Cova da Piedade.

== Club career ==
Kakuba began his professional career at Proline FC. He left Proline FC in the summer of 2012, transferring on a free to the Portuguese fourth-tier side Esperança Lagos. In January 2013, he joined the second-tier outfit Covilhã, making 50 league appearances for two seasons. On 14 June 2014, Kakuba moved to the Estoril Praia in the top-flight Primeira Liga, signing a four-year deal.

Kakuba signed for 2 years for PAS Giannina in July 2018. He released on a free transfer on 10 December 2018.

On 27 March 2019, Kakuba signed for Lori FC. In June 2019, he then joined Portuguese club C.D. Cova da Piedade.
