= Alexandros Nikolias =

Greek footballer

Personal information
- Date of birth: 23 July 1994 (age 32)
- Place of birth: Kymi, Greece
- Height: 1.76 m (5 ft 9 in)
- Position: Winger

Team information
- Current team: Anagennisi Karditsa
- Number: 88

Youth career
- 2009–2012: AEK Athens

Senior career*
Years	Team	Apps	(Gls)
2012–2013	AEK Athens	1	(0)
2013–2014	Glyfada	10	(1)
2014–2016	Olympiacos Volos	51	(7)
2016–2020	PAS Giannina	75	(6)
2020–2022	Olympiacos	0	(0)
2020–2022	→ AEL (loan)	44	(3)
2022–2023	AEL	23	(3)
2023–2024	Levadiakos	10	(0)
2024–2025	PAS Giannina	19	(3)
2025–	Anagennisi Karditsa	13	(0)
- * Club domestic league appearances and goals as of 20 April 2026

Alexandros Nikolias (Greek: Αλέξανδρος Νικολιάς; born 23 July 1994) is a Greek professional footballer who plays as a winger for Super League 2 club Anagennisi Karditsa.

== Honours ==
PAS Giannina

- Super League 2: 2019–20
