= Dušan Pantelić =

Serbian footballer

Personal information
- Date of birth: 15 April 1993 (age 33)
- Place of birth: Kragujevac, FR Yugoslavia
- Height: 1.78 m (5 ft 10 in)
- Position: Midfielder

Senior career*
Years	Team	Apps	(Gls)
2011–2014	Rad	2	(0)
2011–2012	→ Palić (loan)	21	(6)
2013	→ Mladenovac (loan)	13	(1)
2013	→ Srem Jakovo (loan)	12	(2)
2014	→ Teleoptik (loan)	14	(1)
2014	Voždovac	4	(0)
2015	Napredak Kruševac	5	(0)
2015	Bežanija	13	(3)
2016–2017	Novi Pazar	16	(0)
2017–2018	Radnik Surdulica	49	(4)
2019	PAS Giannina	11	(0)
2019–2021	Radnički Niš	50	(2)
2021–2022	Honvéd	24	(0)
2022–2023	Tuzla City	22	(2)
2023–2024	Železničar Pančevo	17	(0)
2024–2026	Javor Ivanjica	53	(5)
- * Club domestic league appearances and goals as of 13 June 2026

Dušan Pantelić (Serbian Cyrillic: Душан Пантелић; born 15 April 1993) is a Serbian professional footballer who plays as a midfielder.

== Career ==
Pantelić signed a contract with PAS Giannina on 20 January 2019. He released on a free transfer on 31 August 2019. He signed a contract with FK Radnički Niš.

On 9 July 2021, he signed a one-season contract with Honvéd in Hungary.

On 29 July 2022, Pantelić signed a three-year contract with Bosnian club Tuzla City.
