= Nikos Karanikas =

Greek footballer

Personal information
- Full name: Nikolaos Karanikas
- Date of birth: 4 March 1992 (age 34)
- Place of birth: Larissa, Greece
- Height: 1.76 m (5 ft 9 1/2 in)
- Position: Right-back

Team information
- Current team: Ilioupoli
- Number: 20

Youth career
- 2006–2010: AEL

Senior career*
Years	Team	Apps	(Gls)
2010–2015	AEL	59	(2)
2015–2018	PAS Giannina	70	(0)
2018–2021	AEL	44	(0)
2021–2022	Anagennisi Karditsa	28	(0)
2022–2023	Zimbru Chișinău	6	(0)
2023	Trikala	0	(0)
2023–2024	Aiolikos	26	(0)
2024–	Ilioupoli	18	(0)
- * Club domestic league appearances and goals as of 15 June 2025

Nikos Karanikas (Greek: Νίκος Καρανίκας; born 4 March 1992) is a Greek professional footballer who plays as a right-back for Super League 2 club Ilioupoli.

== Career ==
Karanikas started his career from his hometown team AEL. He played for the club's youth teams from 2006 to 2010, until he signed a 5-years professional contract and moved to the first squad upon turning 18, in June 2010. On 23 June 2015 he signed a 3 years contract with PAS Giannina. The summer of 2018 he came back in AEL and signed a 3 years contract. On 14 May 2021 there was an official announcement about the termination of the player's contract by mutual agreement.
