= Markos Vellidis =

Greek former footballer

Personal information
- Date of birth: 4 April 1987 (age 39)
- Place of birth: Korisos, Greece
- Height: 1.85 m (6 ft 1 in)
- Position: Goalkeeper

Youth career
- –2005: Panathinaikos

Senior career*
Years	Team	Apps	(Gls)
2005–2008	Panathinaikos	0	(0)
2006–2007	→ Koropi (loan)	17	(0)
2007–2008	→ Diagoras (loan)	36	(0)
2008–2010	Diagoras	55	(0)
2010–2013	Aris	48	(0)
2013–2016	PAS Giannina	82	(0)
2016	PAOK	11	(0)
2017–2019	PAS Giannina	47	(0)
2019	Lamia	7	(0)
2020	Olympiakos Nicosia	7	(0)
2020–2022	Veria	49	(0)
2022–2024	Iraklis	25	(0)

International career^{‡}
2006–2008	Greece U21	1	(0)
2015	Greece	1	(0)
- * Club domestic league appearances and goals as of 31 March 2025 ‡ National team caps and goals as of 21 November 2025

Markos Vellidis (Greek: Μάρκος Βελλίδης; born 4 April 1987) is a former Greek professional footballer who played as a goalkeeper.

== Club career ==
=== Panathinaikos ===
Vellidis began his career by signing with Panathinaikos in August 2005. In 2006–07 season, he went on loan to Koropi, with playing in 17 matches. The next season, he went on loan to Diagoras, and played in 36 matches.

=== Diagoras ===
In 2008, Diagoras bought Vellidis from Panathinaikos. He made 62 league appearances for the club. He was a penalty-stopper and was well known among fans. There was minor interest from some teams, but the biggest was by Aris. Diagoras' fans expressed their support for their goalkeeper and hoped that Markos would have the opportunity to play in for a larger club. He subsequently signed with Aris, a team that has competed in domestic and European competitions.

=== Aris ===
Following his performances for Diagoras, he signed with Aris on 15 June 2010 and was assigned the number 1 shirt.

==== 2010–11 season ====
In the 2010–2011 season, Vellidis made four appearances for Aris. Following these matches, he was identified as a promising plater and as a potential alternative to Sifakis in goal.

==== 2011–12 season ====
In the 2011–2012 season, first choice goalkeeper of Aris, Michalis Sifakis, had medical problems, which sidelined him for 5–8 months. Vellidis played his first of the season on 2 October 2011 against Skoda Xanthi in Kleanthis Vikelidis, giving a fine performance, with having a clean sheet. Since then, Vellidis is the first goalkeeper in the team. This season was the best of Vellidis's career so far.

==== 2012–13 season ====
Aris was in difficult times, but Vellidis was one of those who stayed loyal to Aris. He was the first choice goalkeeper and the fans wanted him to stay for a lot years. He is the young star of Aris, along with Giannis Gianniotas. He had an argument with coach Makis Katsavakis just before the match against Panionios at the Kleanthis Vikelidis Stadium. However, it was decided that Vellidis will stay in team.

=== PAS Giannina ===
Vellidis signed with PAS Giannina on 13 June 2013 on a 2-year contract. His first appearance with the club was on 18 August 2013 in an away 3–3 draw against Asteras Tripolis.

According to various sources, Vellidis is in Olympiacos transfer shortlist and the Greek champions were watching him. Balazs Megyeri's contract would expire in summer and it probably would not be renewed. Therefore, Olympiacos were already looking for his replacement and the Greek player was one of the candidates. Being one of the most stable and most valuable players of PAS Giannina F.C. during the last seasons, and in any case, the 28-year-old keeper accepted his offer with a new three-year contract for an undisclosed fee which will tie him with the club till 2018.

He started the 2015–16 season being the MVP of the 2nd day of the Super League Greece in a victorious 3–1 home win against PAOK, as the keeper of PAS Giannina kept upright team with chips after the first half-hour, when his opponent pushed too much and lost significant opportunities for the equalizer. From the 30th minute until the end of the half the Greek international showed superb reactions to shots from Róbert Mak, Erik Sabo and Marin Leovac.

=== PAOK ===
On 19 January 2016, Vellidis signed a half-year contract with PAOK with a possible extension for two more years, for an undisclosed fee. On 24 January 2016, he made his debut with the club in a derby match against rivals AEK Athens. In summer 2016, the coming of Serbian international Željko Brkić and the fact that Panagiotis Glykos seemed to be the first goalie for PAOK coach Vladimir Ivić created an extra pressure to Vellidis for the first goalie of the new season. As a result, he played only one game for the 2016–17 season in a 7–0 away Greek Football Cup win against Panelefsiniakos F.C. On 31 January 2017, Vellidis solved his contract with the club.

On 2 March 2017, English Championship club Nottingham Forest have taken Vellidis on trial. The 29-year-old left Greek side PAOK at the end of the January transfer window, enabling him to sign for another club before the end of the campaign. From the beginning of 2017, he started training as a free agent with ex-club PAS Giannina.

=== PAS Giannina ===
On 28 June 2017, he was officially included in the roster of his ex-club PAS Giannina, but he was never the same, and after some poor appearances, he was replaced by second choice goalie, Neofytos Michael. On 7 May 2019 after the relegation, Vellidis mutually solved his contract with the club.

=== Lamia ===
On 19 June 2019, he was officially included in the roster of Super League Greece club Lamia signing a two years' contract for an undisclosed fee. On 6 November 2019, the serial of the international goalie with Lamia came to an end in a joint consent, on the occasion of the away game against champions PAOK.

=== Olympiakos Nicosia ===
On 8 January 2020 he signed for Cypriot First Division club Olympiakos Nicosia.

=== Veria ===
On 22 August 2020 he signed for Super League 2 club Veria

== International career ==
On 10 August 2012 Greece head coach Fernando Santos announced the first call up of Vellidis for the friendly match against Norway. He made his international debut on 16 June 2015 in a friendly away match against Poland, replacing Stefanos Kapino at the end of the match.

== Career statistics ==
As of 6 June 2022

Club performance			League		Cup		Continental		Total	
Season	Club	League	Apps	Goals	Apps	Goals	Apps	Goals	Apps	Goals
Greece			League		Greek Cup		Europe		Total	
2005–06	Panathinaikos	Alpha Ethniki	0	0	0	0	0	0	0	0
2006–07	Koropi	Gamma Ethniki	17	0	0	0	0	0	17	0
2007–08	Diagoras	Gamma Ethniki	36	0	0	0	0	0	36	0
2008–09	Diagoras	Beta Ethniki	31	0	0	0	0	0	31	0
2009–10	Diagoras	Beta Ethniki	31	0	1	0	0	0	32	0
2010–11	Aris	Super League Greece	4	0	0	0	0	0	4	0
2011–12	Aris	Super League Greece	26	0	2	0	0	0	28	0
2012–13	Aris	Super League Greece	18	0	1	0	0	0	19	0
2013–14	PAS Giannina	Super League Greece	32	0	0	0	0	0	32	0
2014–15	PAS Giannina	Super League Greece	32	0	1	0	0	0	33	0
2015–16	PAS Giannina	Super League Greece	18	0	3	0	0	0	21	0
2015–16	PAOK	Super League Greece	11	0	2	0	0	0	13	0
2016–17	PAOK	Super League Greece	0	0	1	0	0	0	1	0
2017–18	PAS Giannina	Super League Greece	26	0	0	0	0	0	26	0
2018–19	PAS Giannina	Super League Greece	21	0	1	0	0	0	22	0
2019–20	Lamia	Super League Greece	7	0	0	0	0	0	7	0
2019–20	Olympiakos Nicosia	Cypriot First Division	7	0	1	0	0	0	8	0
2021–22	Veria	Super League Greece 2	32	0	0	0	0	0	32	0
Career total			349	0	13	0	0	0	362	0

== Honours ==
- Super League Greece Goalkeeper of the Season: 2014–15 with PAS Giannina
- Super League Greece Team of the Season: 2014–15
