= 2016–17 Olympiacos F.C. season =

Olympiacos
2016–17 season
- Chairman: Evangelos Marinakis
- Manager: Víctor Sánchez from 23 June 2016 until 9 August 2016; Paulo Bento from 11 August 2016 until 6 March 2017; Vasilis Vouzas from 6 March 2017 until 23 March 2017 (interim); Takis Lemonis from 23 March 2017
- Stadium: Karaiskakis Stadium, Piraeus
- Super League Greece: 1st (champions)
- Greek Cup: Semi-final
- Champions League: Third qualifying round
- Europa League: Round of 16
- Top goalscorer: League: Brown Ideye (13); All: Brown Ideye (15)
- Highest home attendance: 31,283
- Lowest home attendance: 9,032
- Average home league attendance: 18,044
Home colours	Away colours	Third colours

The 2016–17 season was Olympiacos's 58th consecutive season in the Super League Greece and their 91st year in existence. The club become the national champions for 7th consecutive year, equalizing the previous record Olympiacos also has for the period 1997–2003 – and for 19th time during the last 21 seasons. Olympiacos participated in the UEFA Europa League and in the Greek Football Cup.

The season was marked by continuous changes of coaches, having changed coaches 5 times during the season. Marco Silva, Víctor Sánchez, Paulo Bento, Vasilis Vouzas and Takis Lemonis coached the team from June 2016 to June 2017.

== Players ==
=== Final squad ===
No.	Name	Nationality	Position(s)	Place of birth	Date of birth (Age)	Signed from	Notes
Goalkeepers
27	Stefanos Kapino	(Greece)	GK	Piraeus, Greece	18 March 1994 (22)	(Germany) Mainz	
31	Nicola Leali	(Italy)	GK	Castiglione delle Stiviere, Italy	17 February 1993 (24)	(Italy) Juventus	on loan
33	Lefteris Choutesiotis	(Greece)	GK	Makrychori, Greece	20 July 1994 (22)	(Greece) Olympiacos Academy	
Defenders
3	Alberto Botía	(Spain)	CB	Alquerías, Spain	27 January 1989 (28)	(Spain) Sevilla	
6	Manuel da Costa	(Morocco)	CB	Saint-Max, France	6 May 1986 (30)	(Turkey) Sivasspor	
22	Aly Cissokho	(France)	LB	Blois, France	15 September 1987 (29)	(England) Aston Villa	on loan
24	Alberto de la Bella	(Spain)	LB	Santa Coloma, Catalonia, Spain	2 December 1985 (31)	(Spain) Real Sociedad	on loan
36	Bruno Viana	(Brazil)	CB	Macaé, Brazil	5 February 1995 (22)	(Brazil) Cruzeiro	
43	Dimitris Nikolaou	(Greece)	CB / LB	Euboea, Greece	13 August 1998 (18)	(Greece) Olympiacos Academy	
44	Juan Carlos Paredes	(Ecuador)	FB / WB / RW	Esmeraldas, Ecuador	8 July 1987 (29)	(England) Watford	on loan
45	Panagiotis Retsos	(Greece)	CB	Johannesburg, South Africa	9 August 1998 (18)	(Greece) Olympiacos Academy	
77	Diogo Figueiras	(Portugal)	RB	Castanheira do Ribatejo, Portugal	1 July 1991 (25)	(Spain) Sevilla	
Midfielders
4	Alaixys Romao	(Togo)	CM	L'Haÿ-les-Roses, France	18 January 1984 (33)	(France) Marseille	
7	Kostas Fortounis	(Greece)	AM	Trikala, Greece	16 October 1992 (24)	(Germany) Kaiserslautern	
8	Andreas Bouchalakis	(Greece)	CM	Heraklion, Greece	5 April 1993 (23)	(Greece) Ergotelis	
10	Alejandro Domínguez	(Argentina)	AM	Lanús, Argentina	10 June 1981 (35)	(Spain) Rayo Vallecano	
11	Marko Marin	(Germany)	AM / LW	Bosanska Gradiška, SFR Yugoslavia	13 March 1989 (27)	(England) Chelsea	
19	Esteban Cambiasso	(Argentina)	DM	Buenos Aires, Argentina	18 August 1980 (36)	(England) Leicester City	
28	André Martins	(Portugal)	CM	Santa Maria da Feira, Portugal	21 January 1990 (27)	(Portugal) Sporting CP	
32	Thanasis Androutsos	(Greece)	AM	Marousi, Greece	6 May 1997 (19)	(Greece) Olympiacos Academy	
52	Giorgos Manthatis	(Greece)	CM	Sofia, Bulgaria	11 May 1997 (19)	(Greece) Olympiacos Academy	
Forwards
9	Óscar Cardozo	(Paraguay)	ST	Juan Eulogio Estigarribia, Paraguay	20 May 1983 (33)	(Turkey) Trabzonspor	
17	Karim Ansarifard	(Iran)	ST	Ardabil, Iran	3 April 1990 (26)	(Greece) Panionios	
18	Tarik Elyounoussi	(Norway)	ST / LW	Al Hoceïma, Morocco	23 February 1988 (28)	(Germany) Hoffenheim	
92	Sebá	(Brazil)	LW / CF	Salvador, Brazil	8 June 1992 (24)	(Portugal) Estoril	

For recent transfers, see List of Greek football transfers summer 2016

=== Youth players registered in first team ===
Olympiacos U20 is the youth team of Olympiacos. They participate in the Super League U20 championship and in UEFA Youth League competition. They play their home games at the 3,000-seater Renti Training Centre in Renti, Piraeus. Note: Flags indicate national team as defined under FIFA eligibility rules; some limited exceptions apply. Players may hold more than one non-FIFA nationality.

No.	Pos.	Nation	Player
15	DF	ALB	Ardit Toli
30	GK	GRE	Dimitris Skafidas
34	MF	GRE	Dimitris Tasioulis
38	MF	GRE	Konstantinos Megaritis

No.	Pos.	Nation	Player
39	MF	GRE	Giorgos Xydas
40	GK	GRE	Christos Karadais
42	MF	ALB	Marius Vrushaj

=== International players ===
- (Albania) Ardit Toli (U-21)
- (Spain) Alberto de la Bella
- (Ecuador) Juan Carlos Paredes
- (Iran) Karim Ansarifard
- (Italy) Nicola Leali (U-21)
- (Morocco) Manuel da Costa
- (Norway) Tarik Elyounoussi
- (Paraguay) Óscar Cardozo
- (Portugal) André Martins
- (Togo) Alaixys Romao

- (Greece) Kostas Fortounis
- (Greece) Stefanos Kapino (Men's & U-21)
- (Greece) Lefteris Choutesiotis (U-21)
- (Greece) Giorgos Manthatis (U-19)
- (Greece) Thanasis Androutsos (U-19)
- (Greece) Panagiotis Retsos (U-19)
- (Greece) Dimitris Nikolaou (U-19)
- (Greece) Giorgos Xydas (U-19)
- (Greece) Konstantinos Megaritis (U-19)
- (Greece) Marius Vrushaj (U-19)

=== Foreign players ===
EU Nationals

- (Germany) (Bosnia and Herzegovina) (Republika Srpska) (Europe) Marko Marin
- (France) (Senegal) (Europe) Aly Cissokho
- (Spain) (Europe) Alberto de la Bella
- (Italy) (Europe) Nicola Leali
- (Portugal) (Europe) Diogo Figueiras
- (Portugal) (Europe) André Martins
- (Spain) (Europe) Alberto Botía

EU Nationals (Dual Citizenship)

- (Argentina) (Italy) (Europe) Esteban Cambiasso
- (Argentina) (Italy) (Europe) Alejandro Domínguez
- (Morocco) (Portugal) (Europe) Manuel da Costa
- (Togo) (France) (Europe) Alaixys Romao
- (Albania) (Greece) (Europe) Marius Vrushaj

Non-EU Nationals

- (Norway) (Morocco) Tarik Elyounoussi
- (Albania) Ardit Toli
- (Brazil) Sebá
- (Brazil) Bruno Viana
- (Ecuador) Juan Carlos Paredes
- (Iran) Karim Ansarifard
- (Paraguay) Óscar Cardozo

=== Other players under contract ===
- (Greece) Giannis Kargas (co-ownership with (Greece) Platanias)

== Transfers and loans ==
=== Transfers in ===
==== Summer 2016 ====
Note: Flags indicate national team as defined under FIFA eligibility rules; some limited exceptions apply. Players may hold more than one non-FIFA nationality.

No.	Pos.	Nation	Player
—	DF	POR	Diogo Figueiras (from (Spain) Sevilla) (fee: €1.4M)
—	DF	CYP	Constantinos Laifis (from (Cyprus) Anorthosis Famagusta) (fee: €537K)
—	DF	BRA	Bruno Viana (from (Brazil) Cruzeiro)
—	DF	GRE	Antonis Karageorgis (from (Greece) Kalloni)
—	MF	POR	André Martins (from (Portugal) Sporting CP)
—	MF	TOG	Alaixys Romao (from (France) Marseille)
—	MF	GER	Marko Marin (from (England) Chelsea)
—	FW	NOR	Tarik Elyounoussi (from (Germany) Hoffenheim)
—	FW	PAR	Óscar Cardozo (from (Turkey) Trabzonspor)
—	GK	ITA	Nicola Leali (on loan from (Italy) Juventus)
—	DF	ESP	Alberto de la Bella (on loan from (Spain) Real Sociedad)
—	FW	POR	Gonçalo Paciência (on loan from (Portugal) Porto B)
—	GK	GRE	Giorgos Strezos (from (Greece) Panachaiki) (loan return)
—	DF	GRE	Tasos Avlonitis (from (Austria) Sturm Graz) (loan return)
—	DF	GRE	Dimitrios Goutas (from (Greece) Skoda Xanthi) (loan return)
—	DF	GRE	Manolis Bertos (from (Greece) Skoda Xanthi) (loan return)
—	DF	GRE	Epaminondas Pantelakis (from (Greece) Kissamikos) (loan return)
—	MF	GRE	Manolis Tzanakakis (from (Cyprus) Anorthosis Famagusta) (loan return)
—	MF	GRE	Theofanis Tzandaris (from (Greece) Panionios) (loan return)
—	MF	GRE	Giannis Gianniotas (from (Cyprus) APOEL) (loan return)
—	MF	ARG	Nicolás Martínez (from (Cyprus) Anorthosis Famagusta) (loan return)
—	MF	MNE	Marko Janković (from (Slovenia) Maribor) (loan return)
—	MF	NGA	Michael Olaitan (from (Belgium) Kortrijk) (loan return)
—	MF	GRE	Giannis Maniatis (from (Belgium) Standard Liège) (loan return)
—	FW	COM	El Fardou Ben Nabouhane (from (Greece) Levadiakos) (loan return)
—	FW	GRE	Anastasios Karamanos (from (Greece) Panionios) (loan return)
—	FW	GRE	Nikos Vergos (from (Spain) Elche) (loan return)
—	FW	SRB	Marko Šćepović (from (Belgium) Mouscron) (loan return)

==== Winter 2016–2017 ====
Note: Flags indicate national team as defined under FIFA eligibility rules; some limited exceptions apply. Players may hold more than one non-FIFA nationality.

No.	Pos.	Nation	Player
—	DF	FRA	Aly Cissokho (on loan from (England) Aston Villa) (with buying option)
—	DF	ECU	Juan Carlos Paredes (on loan from (England) Watford) (with buying option)
—	MF	ALB	Qazim Laçi (from (Cyprus) APOEL) (loan return)
—	MF	GRE	Konstantinos Plegas (from (Greece) Panthrakikos) (loan return)
—	FW	IRN	Karim Ansarifard (from (Greece) Panionios)

=== Transfers out ===
==== Summer 2016 ====
Note: Flags indicate national team as defined under FIFA eligibility rules; some limited exceptions apply. Players may hold more than one non-FIFA nationality.

No.	Pos.	Nation	Player
11	MF	SUI	Pajtim Kasami (on loan to (England) Nottingham Forest)
15	MF	ALB	Qazim Laçi (on loan to (Cyprus) APOEL)
16	GK	ESP	Roberto (transfer to (Spain) Espanyol) (fee: €3M)
16	FW	GRE	Nikos Vergos (on loan to (Spain) Real Madrid B)
17	FW	MEX	Alan Pulido (transfer to (Mexico) Chivas Guadalajara)
19	MF	ESP	David Fuster (released)
20	MF	GRE	Dimitris Kolovos (on loan to (Belgium) Mechelen)
21	MF	SWE	Jimmy Durmaz (transfer to (France) Toulouse) (fee: €2.5M)
26	DF	FRA	Arthur Masuaku (transfer to (England) West Ham) (fee: €7M)
27	FW	PAR	Jorge Benítez (transfer to (Mexico) Cruz Azul, previously on loan)
30	DF	BRA	Leandro Salino (released)
34	MF	GRE	Manolis Saliakas (on loan to (Cyprus) Karmiotissa)
46	MF	GRE	Konstantinos Plegas (on loan to (Greece) Panthrakikos)
77	FW	POR	Hernâni (loan return to (Portugal) Porto)
99	FW	NGA	Michael Olaitan (free transfer to (Greece) Panionios)
–	GK	GRE	Giorgos Strezos (transfer to (Greece) Panegialios)
–	DF	GRE	Manolis Bertos (transfer to (Greece) Asteras Tripoliσ)
–	DF	GRE	Manolis Tzanakakis (free transfer to (Greece) Aris)
–	DF	CYP	Constantinos Laifis (on loan to (Belgium) Standard Liège)
–	DF	GHA	Mark Asigba (on loan to (Greece) Veria)
–	DF	GRE	Dimitrios Goutas (on loan to (Belgium) Kortrijk)
–	DF	GRE	Epaminondas Pantelakis (on loan to (Greece) Kissamikos)
–	DF	GRE	Antonis Karageorgis (on loan to (Greece) Kalloni)
–	DF	GRE	Tasos Avlonitis (released)
–	MF	GRE	Giannis Gianniotas (on loan to (Cyprus) APOEL)
–	MF	MNE	Marko Janković (on loan to (Serbia) Partizan)
–	MF	ARG	Nicolás Martínez (on loan to (Australia) Western Sydney Wanderers)
–	FW	COM	El Fardou Ben Nabouhane (on loan to (Greece) Panionios)
–	FW	GRE	Anastasios Karamanos (on loan to (Portugal) Feirense)
–	FW	SRB	Marko Šćepović (transfer to (Hungary) Videoton)

==== Winter 2016–2017 ====
Note: Flags indicate national team as defined under FIFA eligibility rules; some limited exceptions apply. Players may hold more than one non-FIFA nationality.

No.	Pos.	Nation	Player
2	MF	GRE	Giannis Maniatis (released)
5	MF	SRB	Luka Milivojević (transfer to (England) Crystal Palace)
14	DF	NOR	Omar Elabdellaoui (on loan to (England) Hull City)
20	DF	GRE	Konstantinos Tsimikas (on loan to (Denmark) Esbjerg)
21	FW	POR	Gonçalo Paciência (loan return to (Portugal) Porto B)
23	DF	GRE	Dimitris Siovas (on loan to (Spain) Leganés)
29	DF	GRE	Praxitelis Vouros (on loan to (Greece) Levadiakos)
44	MF	SRB	Saša Zdjelar (on loan to (Spain) Mallorca)
90	FW	COL	Felipe Pardo (on loan to (France) Nantes)
99	FW	NGA	Brown Ideye (transfer to (China) Tianjin TEDA)
–	MF	MNE	Marko Janković (transfer to (Serbia) Partizan, previously on loan)
–	MF	ALB	Qazim Laçi (on loan to (Greece) Levadiakos)
–	MF	GRE	Theofanis Tzandaris (on loan to (Slovenia) Koper)

== Personnel ==
=== Management ===
Position	Staff
Owner	(Greece) Evangelos Marinakis
President	(Greece) Evangelos Marinakis
1st Vice–President	(Greece) Savvas Theodoridis
2nd Vice–President	(Greece) Socratis S. Kokkalis
3rd Vice–President; Football Department and Transfers Manager	(Greece) Michalis Kountouris
4th Vice–President; Head of Legal Department and Club Representative	(Greece) Theodoros Giannikos
5th Vice–President	(Greece) Giannis Moralis
6th Vice–President	(Greece) Dimitris Agrafiotis
Chief Director	(Greece) Ioannis Vrentzos
Strategic Advisor and International Relations	(New Caledonia) Christian Karembeu
Infrastructure; Olympiacos Academy and Administrative Director	(Greece) Georgios Pavlou
Commercial; Corporate Communication and Social Awareness Director	(Greece) Konstantinos Kardiasmenos

=== Coaching, technical and medical staff ===
Coaching staff
Head coach	(Greece) Takis Lemonis
Assistant coach	(Argentina) Ariel Ibagaza (interim)
Assistant coach	(Greece) Tasos Pantos (interim)
Goalkeeping coach	(Greece) Alekos Rantos (interim)
Analyst
Analyst	(Greece) Giannis Vogiatzakis
Analyst	(Greece) Giorgos Martakos
Fitness trainer
Fitness trainer	(Greece) Christos Mourikis
Fitness trainer	(Greece) Manos Smpokos
Technical staff
Technical Consultant and Sports Director	(France) François Modesto
Strategic Advisor and International Relations	(New Caledonia) Christian Karembeu
Marketing and Sponsoring Director	(France) Eric Abidal
Team Manager	(Greece) Kyriakos Dourekas
Interpreter	(Spain) Roberto García Peral
Interpreter	(Greece) Marina Tsali
Medical staff
Head doctor	(Greece) Christos Theos
Physio	(Greece) Nikos Lykouresis
Physio	(Greece) Thomas Thomas
Physio	(Greece) Nikolaos Koulopoulos
Nutritionist – Physiologist	(Greece) Maria Lykomitrou

=== Scouting staff ===
Head of Scouting Department	(France) François Modesto
Scout	(Greece) Giorgos Kokolakis
Scout	(Greece) Dimitrios Barbalias
Scout	(Greece) Nikos Vamvakoulas
Scout	(Greece) Georgios Amanatidis
Scout	(Brazil) Giovanni
Scout	(Argentina) Luciano Galletti

=== Olympiacos Academy ===
Technical Director	(Greece) Thodoris Eleftheriadis
General Manager	(Greece) Tasos Mitropoulos
U20–U19 coach	(Greece) Vasilis Vouzas
Youth goalkeeping coach	(Albania) Foto Strakosha
Youth goalkeeping coach	(Greece) Alekos Rantos
U18–U9–U8 coach	(Greece) Giannis Schinarakis
U17 coach	(Greece) Dimitris Mavrogenidis
U16 coach	(Greece) Giorgos Papakostoulis
U15 coach	(Greece) Tasos Theos
U14 coach	(Greece) Nikos Topoliatis
U13 coach	(Greece) Fotis Papapanagis
U12 coach	(Greece) Tasos Pantos
U11 coach	(Greece) Tasos Kyriakopoulos
U10 coach	(Greece) Iakovos Chatziraptis

== Friendlies ==
Win Draw Loss Upcoming fixture

=== June friendlies ===
27 June 2016 Friendly	SV Horn	1–4	Olympiacos	Axams, Tyrol, Austria
18:00	Tano 55'	Report	Pulido 5', 23'; Fortounis 34'; Gianniotas 56'	Stadium: Axams Training Ground; Attendance: unknown Referee: unknown

30 June 2016 Friendly	Wacker Innsbruck	1–1	Olympiacos	Längenfeld, Tyrol, Austria
17:30	Kerschbaum 23'	Report	Pulido 80'	Stadium: Längenfeld Training Ground; Attendance: unknown Referee: Reinhold Fischer (Austria)

=== July friendlies ===
8 July 2016 Friendly	Gent	2–2	Olympiacos	Ghent, Belgium
20:30	Simon 31'; Perbet 44' (pen.)	Report	Ideye 38'; Fortounis 58'	Stadium: Ghelamco Arena; Attendance: unknown Referee: Sébastien Delferière (Belgium)

13 July 2016 Friendly	Westerlo	2–3	Olympiacos	Westerlo, Belgium
19:00	Ganvoula 82'; De Ceulaer 90'	Report	Pulido 39' (pen.); Androutsos 62'; Ideye 65'	Stadium: Het Kuipje; Attendance: unknown Referee: unknown

15 July 2016 Friendly	Club Brugge	0–0	Olympiacos	Roeselare, Belgium
19:00		Report		Stadium: Schiervelde Stadion; Attendance: unknown Referee: unknown

20 July 2016 Friendly	Atromitos	3–1	Olympiacos	Peristeri, Athens, Greece
21:00	Bíttolo 27'; Le Tallec 73', 84'	Report	Milivojević 33'	Stadium: Peristeri Stadium; Attendance: unknown Referee: unknown

=== August friendlies ===
7 August 2016 Friendly	Beşiktaş	1–0	Olympiacos	Beşiktaş, Istanbul, Turkey
20:00	Şişmanoğlu 58'	Report		Stadium: Vodafone Arena; Attendance: unknown Referee: unknown

13 August 2016 Friendly	Olympiacos	3–1	Aris	Piraeus, Greece
noon	Pardo 39'; Fortounis 43' (pen.), 44'	Report	Ilić 78'	Stadium: Karaiskakis Stadium; Attendance: unknown Referee: unknown

31 August 2016 Friendly	Olympiacos	2–0	Levadiakos	Piraeus, Greece
20:00	Tripotseris 22' (o.g.); Androutsos 94'	Report		Stadium: Karaiskakis Stadium; Attendance: unknown Referee: unknown

Notes

1. Opponent and stadium changed. Originally a friendly between Royal Standard de Liège and Olympiacos FC.

== Competitions ==
Win Draw Loss Upcoming fixture

=== Super League Greece ===
==== League table ====
Pos	Team	Pld	W	D	L	GF	GA	GD	Pts	Qualification or relegation
1	Olympiacos (C)	30	21	4	5	57	16	+41	67	Qualification for the Champions League third qualifying round
2	PAOK (Note: PAOK were deducted three points as they did not show up to the second semi-final match against Olympiacos in last year's Greek Cup.)	30	20	4	6	52	19	+33	61	Qualification for the Play-offs
3	Panathinaikos	30	16	9	5	45	19	+26	57	Qualification for the Play-offs
4	AEK Athens	30	14	11	5	54	23	+31	53	Qualification for the Play-offs
5	Panionios	30	15	7	8	35	23	+12	52	Qualification for the Play-offs

Source: Super League Greece
Rules for classification: 1) Points; 2) Head-to-head points; 3) Head-to-head goal difference; 4) Goals scored; 5) Goals against; 6) Play-offs (neutral ground); 7) Draw.
(Note: Criteria 6 is only used if needed to decide champion, teams for relegation or teams for UEFA competitions).
(C) Champions

==== Results summary ====
Overall								Home						Away					
Pld	W	D	L	GF	GA	GD	Pts	W	D	L	GF	GA	GD	W	D	L	GF	GA	GD
30	21	4	5	57	16	+41	67	13	1	1	39	6	+33	8	3	4	18	10	+8

Last updated: 30 April 2017.
Source: Competitive matches

==== Results by round ====
Round	1	2	3	4	5	6	7	8	9	10	11	12	13	14	15	16	17	18	19	20	21	22	23	24	25	26	27	28	29	30
Ground	H	A	H	A	A	H	A	H	A	H	A	H	H	A	H	A	H	A	H	H	A	H	A	H	A	H	A	A	H	A
Result	W	W	W	W	L	W	W	W	W	W	D	D	W	W	W	D	W	W	W	W	L	L	L	W	L	W	W	D	W	W
Position	1	1	4	2	1	1	1	1	1	1	1	1	1	1	1	1	1	1	1	1	1	1	1	1	1	1	1	1	1	1

A = Away; H = Home; W = Win; D = Draw; L = Loss

==== Matches ====
Win Draw Loss Postponed

4 January 2017^{[1]} 1	Olympiacos	2–1	Asteras Tripolis	Piraeus
19:30	Fortounis 54'; Marin 90'	Report	Mazza 27' (pen.)	Stadium: Karaiskakis Stadium; Attendance: 15,532; Referee: Aristidis Vatsios

8 January 2017^{[2]} 2	Xanthi	0–2	Olympiacos	Xanthi
19:30		Report	Ideye 38'; Milivojević 89'	Stadium: Xanthi FC Arena; Attendance: 1,271; Referee: Stavros Mantalos

11 September 2016 3	Olympiacos	6–1	Veria	Piraeus
20:30	Ideye 25', 61', 89'; Sebá 27'; Elyounoussi 41'; Milivojević 49'	Report	Kapetanos 74'	Stadium: Karaiskakis Stadium; Attendance: 20,213; Referee: Ioannis Delfakis (Arcadia)

18 September 2016 4	Iraklis	1–2	Olympiacos	Thessaloniki
20:30	Perrone 5'	Report	Domínguez 51' (pen.); Ideye 75'	Stadium: Kaftanzoglio Stadium; Attendance: 3,864; Referee: Ananias Fotiadis

25 September 2016 5	Larissa	1–0	Olympiacos	Larissa
20:30	Golias 90+2'	Report		Stadium: AEL FC Arena; Attendance: 5,507; Referee: Ioannis Papadopoulos (Macedonia)

2 October 2016 6	Olympiacos	3–0	AEK Athens	Piraeus
20:30	Ideye 7'; Martins 64'; Fortounis 79'	Report		Stadium: Karaiskakis Stadium; Attendance: 24,175; Referee: Anastasios Sidiropoulos

15 October 2016 7	Panionios	0–2	Olympiacos	Nea Smyrni
20:30		Report	Botía 15'; Milivojević 64'	Stadium: Nea Smyrni Stadium; Attendance: 3,171; Referee: Marios Lampropoulos

23 October 2016 8	Olympiacos	2–1	PAOK	Piraeus
20:30	Varela 25' (o.g.); Milivojević 90'	Report	Varela 6'	Stadium: Karaiskakis Stadium; Attendance: 24,727; Referee: Alexandros Aretopoulos

29 October 2016 9	Atromitos	0–1	Olympiacos	Peristeri
19:30		Report	Ideye 53'	Stadium: Peristeri Stadium; Attendance: 1,553; Referee: Ioannis Delfakis (Arcadia)

6 November 2016 10	Olympiacos	3–0	Panathinaikos	Piraeus
19:30	Botía 21'; Elyounoussi 26'; Ideye 44'	Report		Stadium: Karaiskakis Stadium; Attendance: 31,283; Referee: Anastasios Sidiropoulos

14 January 2017^{[3]} 11	Platanias	2–2	Olympiacos	Platanias
19:30	Giakoumakis 36'; Manousos 40' (pen.)	Report	Ideye 4', 13'	Stadium: Perivolia Municipal Stadium; Attendance: 2,456; Referee: Giorgos Foukakis (Heraklion)

27 November 2016 12	Olympiacos	0–0	Kassiopi	Piraeus
15:00		Report		Stadium: Karaiskakis Stadium; Attendance: 9,032; Referee: Giorgos Blanas (Messinia)

4 December 2016 13	Olympiacos	4–0	Levadiakos	Piraeus
15:00	Ideye 48', 74'; Milivojević 69'; Fortounis 71'	Report		Stadium: Karaiskakis Stadium; Attendance: 13,564; Referee: Angelos Evangelou (Athens)

12 December 2016 14	PAS Giannina	0–2	Olympiacos	Ioannina
19:30		Report	Cardozo 68'; Sebá 90'	Stadium: Zosimades Stadium; Attendance: 4,009; Referee: Anastasios Papapetrou (Athens)

18 December 2016 15	Olympiacos	3–1	Panetolikos	Piraeus
15:00	Sebá 62'; Cardozo 83'; Figueiras 85'	Report	Kousas 52'	Stadium: Karaiskakis Stadium; Attendance: 15,528; Referee: Alexandros Katsikogiannis (Epirus)

18 January 2017 16	Asteras Tripolis	0–0	Olympiacos	Tripoli
19:30		Report		Stadium: Theodoros Kolokotronis Stadium; Attendance: 1,772; Referee: Giorgos Kyzas (Drama)

21 January 2017 17	Olympiacos	2–0	Xanthi	Piraeus
19:30	Svarnas 48' (o.g.); Manthatis 90+1'	Report		Stadium: Karaiskakis Stadium; Attendance: 16,150; Referee: Giorgos Kominis

29 January 2017 18	Veria	1–2	Olympiacos	Veria
19:30	Sarpong 24'	Report	Fortounis 11'; Milivojević 35'	Stadium: Veria Stadium; Attendance: 1,425; Referee: Athanasios Tzilos (Larissa)

5 February 2017 19	Olympiacos	3–0	Iraklis	Piraeus
19:30	Viana 2'; Elyounoussi 42'; Fortounis 56'	Report		Stadium: Karaiskakis Stadium; Attendance: 14,956; Referee: Evangelos Kiotzenis

11 February 2017 20	Olympiacos	2–0	Larissa	Piraeus
19:30	Androutsos 1'; Ideye 9'	Report		Stadium: Karaiskakis Stadium; Attendance: 13,258; Referee: Christos Granas

19 February 2017 21	AEK Athens	1–0	Olympiacos	Athens
19:30	Ajdarević 34'	Report		Stadium: OAKA; Attendance: 28,046; Referee: Stavros Mantalos

26 February 2017 22	Olympiacos	0–1	Panionios	Piraeus
19:30		Report	Masouras 1'	Stadium: Karaiskakis Stadium; Attendance: 17,843; Referee: Giorgos Kominis

5 March 2017 23	PAOK	2–0	Olympiacos	Thessaloniki
19:30	Shakhov 53'; Prijović 60'	Report		Stadium: Toumba Stadium; Attendance: 26,379; Referee: Georgios Kyzas (Drama)

12 March 2017 24	Olympiacos	2–0	Atromitos	Piraeus
15:00	Da Costa 36'; Ansarifard 62'	Report		Stadium: Karaiskakis Stadium; Attendance: 16,532; Referee: Spyros Selimos

19 March 2017 25	Panathinaikos	1–0	Olympiacos	Athens
19:30	Berg 15'	Report		Stadium: Leoforos Stadium; Attendance: 13,666; Referee: Giorgos Kominis

1 April 2017 26	Olympiacos	2–1	Platanias	Piraeus
19:30	Marin 54'; Romao 63'	Report	Manousos 45' (pen.)	Stadium: Karaiskakis Stadium; Attendance: 17,052; Referee: Praxitelis Zachariadis (Macedonia)

5 April 2017 27	Kassiopi	0–2	Olympiacos	Kerkyra
19:30		Report	Fortounis 20'; Marin 77'	Stadium: Kerkyra Stadium; Attendance: 2,042; Referee: Angelos Evangelou (Athens)

9 April 2017 28	Levadiakos	1–1	Olympiacos	Livadeia
19:00	Vasileiou 43'	Report	Cardozo 89'	Stadium: Levadia Municipal Stadium; Attendance: 2,446; Referee: Evangelos Kiotzenis

23 April 2017 29	Olympiacos	5–0	PAS Giannina	Piraeus
19:00	Marin 21'; Da Costa 24'; De La Bella 29', 71'; Domínguez 81' (pen.)	Report		Stadium: Karaiskakis Stadium; Attendance: 20,818; Referee: Athanasios Tzilos (Larissa)

30 April 2017 30	Panetolikos	0–2	Olympiacos	Agrinio
19:00		Report	Domínguez 37'; Elyounoussi 79'	Stadium: Panetolikos Stadium; Attendance: 3,272; Referee: Alexandros Katsikogiannis (Epirus)

(Source:)

^{1} (originally scheduled on 21 August 2016)
^{2} (originally scheduled on 28 August 2016)
^{3} (originally scheduled on 19 November 2016)

=== Greek Football Cup ===
==== Matches ====
===== Group stage =====
Group B

Pos	Team	Pld	W	D	L	GF	GA	GD	Pts	Qualification
1	Olympiacos	3	3	0	0	8	0	+8	9	Round of 16
2	Platanias	3	2	0	1	3	4	−1	6	Round of 16
3	Sparta	3	1	0	2	4	2	+2	3	
4	Chania	3	0	0	3	1	10	−9	0	

Source: epo.gr

26 October 2016 1	Olympiacos	3–0	Platanias	Piraeus
19:30	Pardo 5', 66'; Elabdellaoui 68'	Report		Stadium: Karaiskakis Stadium; Referee: Angelos Evangelou (Athens)

1 December 2016 2	Chania	0–4	Olympiacos	Chania
19:30		Report	Cambiasso 16'; Ideye 25'; Theologou 42' (o.g.); Pardo 49'	Stadium: Perivolia Municipal Stadium; Referee: Spyros Selimos (Laconia)

15 December 2016 3	Sparta	0–1	Olympiacos	Sparta
15:00		Report	Manthatis 65'	Stadium: Sparta Municipal Stadium; Referee: Aristotelis Diamantopoulos (Arcadia)

===== Round of 16 =====
The draw for this round took place on 20 December 2016.

25 January 2017 First leg	Aris	1–1	Olympiacos	Thessaloniki
19:30	Figueiras 13' (o.g.)	Report	Ansarifard 81'	Stadium: Kleanthis Vikelidis Stadium; Referee: Triantafyllos Tikas

2 February 2017 Second leg	Olympiacos	2–0 (3–1 agg.)	Aris	Piraeus
19:30	Cissokho 50'; Nikolaou 86'	Report		Stadium: Karaiskakis Stadium; Referee: Spyros Selimos

The first leg was originally scheduled on 11 January 2017, 19:30

===== Quarter-finals =====
The draw for this round took place on 27 January 2017.

8 February 2017 First leg	Olympiacos	0–0	Atromitos	Piraeus
19:30		Report		Stadium: Karaiskakis Stadium; Referee: Anastasios Papapetrou (Athens)

2 March 2017 Second leg	Atromitos	1–2 (1–2 agg.)	Olympiacos	Peristeri
19:30	Dauda 46'	Report	Romao 63'; Fortounis 71'	Stadium: Peristeri Stadium; Referee: Alexandros Aretopoulos (Trikala)

===== Semi-finals =====
The draw for this round took place on 21 March 2017 (after being delayed on 18 March 2017).

13 April 2017 First leg	Olympiacos	1–2	AEK Athens	Piraeus
19:00	Figueiras 13'	Report	Araujo 6'; Rodríguez 64'	Stadium: Karaiskakis Stadium; Referee: Anastasios Papapetrou (Athens)

26 April 2017 Second leg	AEK Athens	0–1 (2a–2 agg.)	Olympiacos	Athens
19:00		Report	Romao 82'	Stadium: OAKA; Referee: Anastasios Sidiropoulos

=== UEFA Champions League ===
==== Third qualifying round ====
All times at EET

27 July 2016 First leg	Olympiacos (Greece)	0–0	(Israel) Hapoel Be'er Sheva	Piraeus, Greece
21:45		Report		Stadium: Karaiskakis Stadium; Attendance: 20,531; Referee: Jorge Sousa (Portugal)

3 August 2016 Second leg	Hapoel Be'er Sheva (Israel)	1–0 (1–0 agg.)	(Greece) Olympiacos	Be'er Sheva, Israel
21:00	Tzedek 79'	Report		Stadium: Turner Stadium; Attendance: 15,500; Referee: Benoît Bastien (France)

=== UEFA Europa League ===
==== Play-off round ====
All times at EET

18 August 2016 First leg	Arouca (Portugal)	0–1	(Greece) Olympiacos	Arouca, Portugal
22:00		Report	Sebá 27'	Stadium: Estádio Municipal, Attendance: 1,950; Referee: Slavko Vinčić (Slovenia)

25 August 2016 Second leg	Olympiacos (Greece)	2–1 (a.e.t.) (3–1 agg.)	(Portugal) Arouca	Piraeus, Greece
21:45	Domínguez 95'; Ideye 114'	Report	Gegé 80'	Stadium: Karaiskakis Stadium; Attendance: 18,348; Referee: Aleksei Eskov (Russia)

==== Group stage ====
Group B
Team	Pld	W	D	L	GF	GA	GD	Pts
(Cyprus) APOEL	6	4	0	2	8	6	+2	12
(Greece) Olympiacos	6	2	2	2	7	6	+1	8
(Switzerland) Young Boys	6	2	2	2	7	4	+3	8
(Kazakhstan) Astana	6	1	2	3	5	11	-6	5

Times from matchday 1 to 3 at UTC+3. The rest at UTC+2.

15 September 2016 1	Young Boys (Switzerland)	0–1	(Greece) Olympiacos	Bern, Switzerland
20:00 (19:00 local time)		Report	Cambiasso 42'	Stadium: Stade de Suisse; Attendance: 11,132; Referee: Serhiy Boyko (Ukraine)

29 September 2016 2	Olympiacos (Greece)	0–1	(Cyprus) APOEL	Piraeus, Greece
22:05		Report	Sotiriou 10'	Stadium: Karaiskakis Stadium; Attendance: 24,378; Referee: Paweł Gil (Poland)

20 October 2016 3	Olympiacos (Greece)	4–1	(Kazakhstan) Astana	Piraeus, Greece
22:05	Figueiras 25'; Elyounoussi 33'; Sebá 34', 65'	Report	Kabananga 54'	Stadium: Karaiskakis Stadium; Attendance: 21,480; Referee: Tobias Stieler (Germany)

3 November 2016 4	Astana (Kazakhstan)	1–1	(Greece) Olympiacos	Astana, Kazakhstan
18:00 (22:00 local time)	Despotović 8'	Report	Sebá 29'	Stadium: Astana Arena; Referee: Orel Grinfeld (Israel)

24 November 2016 5	Olympiacos (Greece)	1–1	(Switzerland) Young Boys	Piraeus, Greece
22:05	Fortounis 48'	Report	Hoarau 58'	Stadium: Karaiskakis Stadium; Referee: Miroslav Zelinka (Czech Republic)

8 December 2016 6	APOEL (Cyprus)	2–0	(Greece) Olympiacos	Nicosia, Cyprus
20:00	Da Costa 20' (o.g.); De Camargo 83'	Report		Stadium: GSP Stadium; Referee: Carlos del Cerro (Spain)

==== Knockout phase ====
===== Round of 32 =====
All times at EET

16 February 2017 First leg	Olympiacos (Greece)	0–0	(Turkey) Osmanlıspor	Piraeus, Greece
20:00		Report		Stadium: Karaiskakis Stadium; Attendance: 24,478; Referee: Ruddy Buquet (France)

23 February 2017 Second leg	Osmanlıspor (Turkey)	0–3 (0–3 agg.)	(Greece) Olympiacos	Ankara, Turkey
18:00		Report	Ansarifard 47', 86'; Elyounoussi 70'	Stadium: Osmanlı Stadyumu; Attendance: 17,500; Referee: István Vad (Hungary)

===== Round of 16 =====
All times at EET

9 March 2017 First leg	Olympiacos (Greece)	1–1	(Turkey) Beşiktaş	Piraeus, Greece
22:05	Cambiasso 36'	Report	Aboubakar 53'	Stadium: Karaiskakis Stadium; Attendance: 25,515; Referee: Danny Makkelie (Netherlands)

16 March 2017 Second leg	Beşiktaş (Turkey)	4–1 (5–2 agg.)	(Greece) Olympiacos	Istanbul, Turkey
20:00	Aboubakar 10'; Babel 22', 75'; Tosun 84'	Report	Elyounoussi 31'	Stadium: Vodafone Arena; Attendance: 37,966; Referee: Michael Oliver (England)

== Individual Awards ==
Name	Pos.	Award
(Greece) Panagiotis Retsos	Centre-back	Super League Greece Young Player of the Season; Super League Greece Team of the Season
(Greece) Kostas Fortounis	Attacking Midfielder	Super League Greece Team of the Season
