= 2014–15 Olympiacos F.C. season =

Olympiacos
2014–15 season
- Chairman: Evangelos Marinakis
- Manager: Míchel (June 2014–January 2015); Vítor Pereira (January 2015 – May 2015)
- Stadium: Karaiskakis Stadium, Piraeus
- Super League Greece: Champions
- Greek Cup: Winners
- Champions League: Group stage
- Europa League: Round of 32
- Top goalscorer: League: Kostas Mitroglou (16); All: Kostas Mitroglou (19)
- Average home league attendance: 18,297
Home colours	Away colours	Third colours

The 2014–15 season was Olympiacos's 56th consecutive season in the Super League Greece and their 89th year in existence. Olympiacos also participated in the Greek Cup.

Olympiacos won the domestic title for the fifth year in a row.

Olympiacos also participated in UEFA Europa League Knock-out Stage after being eliminated from the UEFA Champions League Group Stage.

On January 6 Olympiacos announced the end of the cooperation with head coach Míchel. Vítor Pereira was hired as the new manager of the team.

== Players ==
No.	Name	Nationality	Position (s)	Date of birth (Age)	Signed from	Games played	Goals scored
Goalkeepers
16	Roberto Jiménez Gago	(Spain)	GK	10 February 1986 (28)	(Spain) Atlético Madrid	50	0
22	Andreas Gianniotis	(Greece)	GK	18 December 1992 (22)	(Greece) Ethnikos Gazoros	2	0
33	Lefteris Choutesiotis	(Greece)	GK	20 July 1994 (20)	(Greece) Olympiacos FC Academy	0	0
42	Balázs Megyeri	(Hungary)	GK	31 March 1990 (24)	(Hungary) Ferencváros	42	0
72	Giorgos Strezos	(Greece)	GK	6 July 1995 (19)	(Greece) Olympiacos FC Academy	0	0
Defenders
3	Alberto Botía	(Spain)	CB	27 January 1989 (25)	(Spain) Sevilla	2	0
14	Omar Elabdellaoui	(Norway)	RB	5 December 1991 (22)	(Germany) Eintracht Braunschweig	2	0
20	Kostas Giannoulis	(Greece)	LB	9 December 1987 (26)	(Greece) Atromitos	0	0
22	Eric Abidal	(France)	CB / LB	11 September 1979 (34)	(France) Monaco	2	0
23	Dimitrios Siovas	(Greece)	CB	16 September 1988 (25)	(Greece) Panionios	27	2
24	Anastasios Avlonitis	(Greece)	CB	1 January 1990 (24)	(Greece) Panionios	0	0
26	Arthur Masuaku	(France)	LB	7 November 1993 (21)	(France) Valenciennes	2	0
30	Leandro Salino	(Brazil)	RB	22 April 1985 (29)	(Portugal) Braga	18	0
Midfielders
2	Giannis Maniatis	(Greece)	DM / CM	12 October 1986 (27)	(Greece) Panionios	85	6
5	Luka Milivojević	(Serbia)	DM / CM	7 April 1991 (23)	(Belgium) Anderlecht	0	0
6	Ibrahim Afellay	(Netherlands)	LW	2 April 1986 (28)	Barcelona	1	1
8	Delvin N'Dinga	(Republic of the Congo)	DM	14 March 1986 (26)	(France) Monaco	21	0
9	Jimmy Durmaz	(Sweden)	RW	22 March 1989 (25)	(Turkey) Gençlerbirliği	1	0
10	Alejandro Domínguez	(Argentina)	AM	10 June 1981 (33)	(Spain) Rayo Vallecano	25	5
11	Pajtim Kasami	(Switzerland)	CM	2 June 1992 (22)	(England) Fulham	2	2
18	Andreas Bouchalakis	(Greece)	CM	5 April 1993 (21)	(Greece) Ergotelis	1	0
19	David Fuster	(Spain)	AM	3 February 1982 (32)	(Spain) Villarreal	88	24
25	Kostas Fortounis	(Greece)	AM	16 October 1992 (21)	(Germany) Kaiserslautern	0	0
55	Gevorg Ghazaryan	(Armenia)	LW	5 April 1988 (26)	(Ukraine) Metalurh Donetsk	1	0
77	Mathieu Dossevi	(Togo)	RW	12 February 1988 (26)	(France) Valenciennes	2	0
Forwards
7	Kostas Mitroglou	(Greece)	CF	12 March 1988 (26)	(England) Fulham	86	41
17	Dimitrios Diamantakos	(Greece)	CF	5 March 1993 (21)		2	1
27	Jorge Benítez	(Paraguay)	CF	2 September 1992 (22)	(Paraguay) Club Guaraní	1	0
99	Michael Olaitan	(Nigeria)	CF	1 January 1993 (21)	(Greece) Veria	16	8

=== Current squad ===
As of 31 January 2015

Note: Flags indicate national team as defined under FIFA eligibility rules; some limited exceptions apply. Players may hold more than one non-FIFA nationality.

No.	Pos.	Nation	Player
2	MF	GRE	Giannis Maniatis (captain)
3	DF	ESP	Alberto Botía
5	MF	SRB	Luka Milivojević
6	MF	NED	Ibrahim Afellay
7	FW	GRE	Kostas Mitroglou
8	MF	CGO	Delvin N'Dinga
9	MF	SWE	Jimmy Durmaz
10	MF	ARG	Alejandro Domínguez
11	MF	SUI	Pajtim Kasami
12	FW	ARG	Franco Jara
14	DF	NOR	Omar Elabdellaoui
16	GK	ESP	Roberto (3rd captain)
17	FW	GRE	Dimitrios Diamantakos
18	MF	GRE	Andreas Bouchalakis
19	MF	ESP	David Fuster (2nd captain)
20	DF	GRE	Kostas Giannoulis

No.	Pos.	Nation	Player
22	GK	GRE	Andreas Gianniotis
23	DF	GRE	Dimitrios Siovas
24	DF	GRE	Anastasios Avlonitis
25	MF	GRE	Kostas Fortounis
26	DF	FRA	Arthur Masuaku
27	FW	PAR	Jorge Benítez
28	FW	GRE	Nikos Vergos
29	DF	GRE	Praxitelis Vouros
30	DF	BRA	Leandro Salino
33	GK	GRE	Lefteris Choutesiotis
34	DF	GRE	Manolis Saliakas
42	GK	HUN	Balázs Megyeri
45	DF	BRA	Felipe Santana
60	MF	NOR	Abdisalam Ibrahim
72	GK	GRE	Georgios Strezos
77	MF	FRA	Mathieu Dossevi

For recent transfers, see List of Greek football transfers summer 2014

=== Olympiacos U20 squad ===
Olympiacos U20 is the youth team of Olympiacos. They participate in the Super League U20 championship and in UEFA Youth League competition. They play their home games at the 3,000-seater Renti Training Centre in Renti, Piraeus.

Note: Flags indicate national team as defined under FIFA eligibility rules; some limited exceptions apply. Players may hold more than one non-FIFA nationality.

No.	Pos.	Nation	Player
—	GK	GRE	Michalis Iliadis
—	GK	GRE	Dimitris Katsimitros
—	GK	GRE	Iasonas Gavalas
—	DF	GRE	Dimitrios Nikolaou
—	DF	GRE	Dimitris Gkoutsios
—	DF	GRE	Dimitrios Pechlivanidis
—	DF	GRE	Konstantinos Betsas
—	DF	GRE	Panayiotis Chelas
—	DF	GRE	Panayiotis Retsos
—	DF	GRE	Efstratios Salatamaras
—	DF	ALB	Ardit Toli
—	DF	GRE	Giorgios Agiotis
—	DF	GRE	Konstantinos Tsimikas
—	DF	GRE	Argyris Toufas
—	DF	GRE	Grigoris Kasapidis
—	MF	GRE	Anastasios Papoutzidis
—	MF	GRE	Charalampos Rentzis
—	MF	BUL	Stanislav Tsonev
—	MF	GRE	Konstantinos Kipouros
—	MF	GRE	Giannis Varkas
—	MF	GRE	Stathis Lamprou

No.	Pos.	Nation	Player
—	MF	GRE	Giorgios Xenitidis
—	MF	GRE	Zisis Karachalios
—	MF	GRE	Andreas Dermitzakis
—	MF	ALB	Stefan Abara
—	MF	ALB	Qazim Laci
—	MF	GRE	Konstantinos Plegas
—	MF	GRE	Giorgios Makrostergios
—	MF	GRE	Konstantinos Megaritis
—	MF	GRE	Achilleas Nasiakopoulos
—	MF	GRE	Athanasios Androutsos
—	MF	GRE	Dimitrios Tzoumakis
—	MF	GRE	Dimosthenis Chatzaras
—	FW	GRE	Kostas Garefalakis
—	FW	GRE	Ilias Ignatidis
—	FW	GRE	Kyriakos Amarantidis
—	FW	GRE	Giannis Angelopoulos
—	FW	GRE	Konstantinos Glegles
—	FW	GRE	Neilos Psychogios
—	FW	ALB	Romario Hajrulla
—	FW	GRE	Giorgios Manthatis
—	FW	GRE	Giorgios Kanavetas

=== Loans ending from 2013–14 season ===
Note: Flags indicate national team as defined under FIFA eligibility rules; some limited exceptions apply. Players may hold more than one non-FIFA nationality.

No.	Pos.	Nation	Player
—	FW	PAR	Hernán Pérez (to (Spain) Villarreal)
—	FW	PAR	Nelson Valdez (to (Germany) Eintracht Frankfurt)
—	FW	CRC	Joel Campbell (to (England) Arsenal)
—	DF	ESP	Iván Marcano (to (Portugal) Porto)

=== Out on loan ===
As of 2 September 2014

Note: Flags indicate national team as defined under FIFA eligibility rules; some limited exceptions apply. Players may hold more than one non-FIFA nationality.

No.	Pos.	Nation	Player
—	DF	GRE	Vasilios Karagounis (to (Italy) Reggina)
—	DF	GRE	Konstantinos Rougalas (to (Spain) Atlético Madrid B)
—	DF	GRE	Manolis Tzanakakis (to (Greece) Ergotelis)
—	DF	GRE	Charalambos Lykogiannis (to (Greece) Ergotelis)

No.	Pos.	Nation	Player
—	MF	GRE	Dimitris Kolovos (to (Greece) Panionios)
—	MF	GRE	Panagiotis Vlachodimos (to (Greece) Ergotelis)
—	MF	GRE	Konstantinos Plegas (to (Greece) Panachaiki)
—	FW	GRE	Nikolaos Ioannidis (to (Netherlands) Zwolle)
—	FW	GRE	Anastasios Karamanos (to (Greece) Atromitos)
—	FW	BEL	David Henen (to (England) Everton B)

== Friendlies ==
Win Draw Loss Upcoming fixture

=== Pre-season Part 1 ===
12 July 2014 Friendly	Olympiacos	0–2	Krasnodar	Schwaz, Austria
18:00 (UTG+3)		Report

17 July 2014 Friendly	Dynamo Kyiv	1–1	Olympiacos	Schwaz, Austria
20:00 (UTG+3)		Report

=== International Champions Cup ===
24 July 2014 Friendly	Olympiacos	3–0	Milan	Toronto, Canada
20:00 (EST)	Domínguez 16'; Diamantakos 49'; Bouchalakis 78'	Report		Stadium: BMO Field

27 July 2014 Friendly	Liverpool	1–0	Olympiacos	Chicago, Illinois, United States
17:00 (CST)	Sterling 5'	Official Site		Stadium: Soldier Field

2 August 2014 Friendly	Olympiacos	2–2 (5–4 p)	Manchester City	Minneapolis, United States
14:00 (CST)	Diamantakos 37', 66'	Report	Jovetić 35'; Kolarov 59' (pen.)	Stadium: TCF Bank Stadium; Attendance: 34,047
	Penalties
	Lykogiannis (penalty scored); Dossevi (penalty missed); Kolovos (penalty scored); Ghazaryan (penalty scored); Papadopoulos (penalty missed); Bouchalakis (penalty scored); Papazoglou (penalty scored)		(penalty scored) Silva; (penalty scored) Kolarov; (penalty missed) Milner; (penalty missed) Sinclair; (penalty scored) Zuculini; (penalty scored) Guidetti; (penalty missed) Richards

=== Pre-season Part 2 ===
13 August 2014 Friendly	Olympiacos	0–0	Athletic Bilbao	Piraeus, Greece
21:30 (UTG+3)		Report		Stadium: Karaiskakis Stadium

16 August 2014 Friendly	Fenerbahçe	2–1	Olympiacos	Istanbul, Turkey
21:30 (UTG+3)	Erkin 35'; Belözoğlu 81'	Report	Holebas 95'	Stadium: Şükrü Saracoğlu Stadium

== Competitions ==
Win Draw Loss Upcoming fixture

=== Super League Greece ===
==== League table ====
Pos	Team	Pld	W	D	L	GF	GA	GD	Pts	Qualification or relegation
1	Olympiacos (C)	34	24	6	4	79	23	+56	78	Qualification for the Champions League group stage
2	Panathinaikos (Note: Panathinaikos were deducted 3 points due to extreme fan behavior.)	34	21	6	7	59	31	+28	66	Qualification for the Play-offs
3	PAOK	34	20	5	9	57	42	+15	65	Qualification for the Play-offs
4	Asteras Tripolis	34	17	8	9	52	37	+15	59	Qualification for the Play-offs
5	Atromitos	34	14	12	8	43	27	+16	54	Qualification for the Play-offs

Source: Super League Greece
Rules for classification: 1) Points; 2) Head-to-head goal difference; 3) Head-to-head points; 4) Goals scored; 5) Play-offs (neutral ground).
(Note: Criteria 5 is only used if needed to decide champion, teams for relegation or teams for UEFA competitions). In any other case, the final standings of tied teams are determined with a public draw.
(C) Champions

==== Results summary ====
Overall								Home						Away					
Pld	W	D	L	GF	GA	GD	Pts	W	D	L	GF	GA	GD	W	D	L	GF	GA	GD
34	24	6	4	79	23	+56	78	15	1	1	45	8	+37	9	5	3	34	15	+19

Last updated: 10 May 2015.
Source: Superleague Greece

==== Positions by round ====
Round	1	2	3	4	5	6	7	8	9	10	11	12	13	14	15	16	17	18	19	20	21	22	23	24	25	26	27	28	29	30	31	32	33	34
Ground	H	A	H	H	A	A	H	A	H	A	H	H	A	H	A	H	A	A	H	A	A	H	A	H	A	H	H	H	H	A	H	A	H	
Result	W	D	W	W	L	W	W	D	W	W	L	D	W	W	W	W	W	W	W	W	W	W	D	W	L	W	W	W	W	L	W	D	W	D
Position	2	5	4	1	5	3 (Note: The sixth round was played between the twelfth and the thirteenth rounds.)	2	2	2	2	2 (Note: The eleventh round was played between the seventeenth and the eighteenth rounds.)	2	2	2	2	2	2	1	1	1	1	1	1	1	1	1	1 (Note: The 27th round is to be played on 15 of April, between the 30th and the 31st rounds.)	1	1	1	1	1	1	1

Source: Superleague Greece
A = Away; H = Home; W = Win; D = Draw; L = Loss

==== Matches ====
23 August 2014 1	Olympiacos	3–1	Niki Volos	Piraeus
21:30	Kasami 11'; Diamantakos 28'; Affelay 32'	report	Shkurti 55'	Stadium: Karaiskakis Stadium; Attendance: 16,347; Referee: Georgios Daskalopoulos

30 August 2014 2	Panetolikos	1–1	Olympiacos	Agrinio
21:30	Kousas 79'	Report	Kasami 47'	Stadium: Panetolikos Stadium; Attendance: 4,490; Referee: Andreas Pappas

13 September 2014 3	Olympiacos	3–0	OFI	Piraeus
20:30	Adeleye 47' (o.g.); Durmaz 44'; Domínguez 54'	Report		Stadium: Karaiskakis Stadium; Attendance: 17,510; Referee: A. Sidiropoulos; Man of the Match: Masuaku

20 September 2014 4	Olympiacos	3–0	Veria	Piraeus
20:30	Mitroglou 33' (pen.); Benítez 88'; Kasami 90+2'	Report		Stadium: Karaiskakis Stadium; Attendance: 17,594; Referee: Charalampos Kalogeropoulos

27 September 2014 5	Atromitos	1–0	Olympiacos	Athens
20:30	Karamanos 29'	Report		Stadium: Peristeri Stadium; Attendance: 3,682; Referee: Stavros Tritsonis

18 October 2014 7	Ergotelis	2–3	Olympiacos	Heraklion
20:30	Yousouf 43'; Handi 63'	Report	Mitroglou 44', 90'; Domínguez 68' (pen.)	Stadium: Pankritio Stadium; Attendance: 6,143; Referee: Aristomenis Koutsiaftis

26 October 2014 8	Olympiacos	1–0	Panathinaikos	Piraeus
19:30	Avlonitis 59'	Report		Stadium: Karaiskakis Stadium; Attendance: 31,458; Referee: Charalampos Kalogeropoulos

1 November 2014 9	Asteras Tripolis	0–0	Olympiacos	Tripoli
19:30		Report		Stadium: Stadio Theodoros Kolokotronis; Attendance: 3,857; Referee: Ilias Spathas

9 November 2014 10	Olympiacos	5–1	Panthrakikos	Piraeus
15:00	Domínguez 36' (pen.); Papageorgiou 39' (o.g.); Avlonitis 67'; Diamantakos 84'; Mitroglou 90'	Report	Cases 79' (pen.)	Stadium: Karaiskakis Stadium; Attendance: 16,325; Referee: Marios Lampropoulos

30 November 2014 12	Kerkyra	0–4	Olympiacos	Kerkyra
15:00		Report	Fuster 20'; Domínguez 50' (pen.), 85'; Elabdellaoui 58'	Stadium: Kerkyra Stadium; Attendance: 1,492; Referee: Alexandros Dimitropoulos

3 December 2014 6^{1}	Olympiacos	1–2	PAOK	Piraeus
19:30	Fuster 45+1'	Report	Athanasiadis 43'; Pereyra 49'	Stadium: Karaiskakis Stadium; Attendance: 28,525; Referee: Alexandros Aretopoulos

6 December 2014 13	Olympiacos	2–2	PAS Giannina	Piraeus
19:30	Fortounis 50' (pen.); Kasami 75'	Report	Michail 22'; Giakos 88'	Stadium: Karaiskakis Stadium; Attendance: 15,044; Referee: Stavros Mantalos

13 December 2014 14	Levadiakos	1–2	Olympiacos	Livadeia
19:30	Tomas 2'	Report	Affelay 73'; Mitroglou 90+1'	Stadium: Levadia Municipal Stadium; Attendance: 2,647; Referee: Ioannis Topouzis

17 December 2014 15	Olympiacos	2–0	Panionios	Piraeus
19:30	Mitroglou 36', 90+1'	Report		Stadium: Karaiskakis Stadium; Attendance: 9,428; Referee: Georgios Liaxoudis

20 December 2014 16	Kalloni	0–5	Olympiacos	Mytilene, Lesbos
19:30		Report	Maniatis 11'; Domínguez 63' (pen.); Benítez 65', 73'; Bouchalakis 78'	Stadium: Mytilene Municipal Stadium; Attendance: 2,357; Referee: Xristos Mitsios

4 January 2015 17	Olympiacos	2–1	Platanias	Piraeus
15:00	N'Dinga 17'; Mitroglou 73'	Report	Aguilera 50'	Stadium: Karaiskakis Stadium; Attendance: 14,895; Referee: Georgios Kizas

11 January 2015 11^{2}	Skoda Xanthi	1–3	Olympiacos	Xanthi
19:30	Lucero 82'	Report	Mitroglou 19', 53'; Dossevi 30'	Stadium: Skoda Xanthi Arena; Attendance: 3,492; Referee: Michail Voskakis

15 January 2015 18	Niki Volos	0–3	Olympiacos	Volos
19:30		without game		Stadium: Panthessaliko Stadium

18 January 2015 19	Olympiacos	2–0	Panetolikos	Piraeus
19:30	Dossevi 69'; Maniatis 93'	Report		Stadium: Karaiskakis Stadium; Attendance: 18,482; Referee: Alexandros Dimitropoulos

24 January 2015 20	OFI	0–3	Olympiacos	Heraklion
19:30		Report	Domínguez 30' (pen.); Fortounis 74'; Mitroglou 88'	Stadium: Theodoros Vardinogiannis Stadium; Attendance: 3,883; Referee: Stavros Tritsonis

1 February 2015 21	Veria	0–2	Olympiacos	Veria
19:30		Report	Mitroglou 71'; Dossevi 87'	Stadium: Veria Stadium; Attendance: 3,491; Referee: Kostantinos Ioannidis

4 February 2015 22	Olympiacos	2–1	Atromitos	Piraeus
19:30	Affelay 30'; Mitroglou 73'	Report	Marcelinho 82'	Stadium: Karaiskakis Stadium; Attendance: 17,824; Referee: Xristos Mitsios

8 February 2015 23	PAOK	0–0	Olympiacos	Thessaloniki
19:30		Report		Stadium: Toumba Stadium; Attendance: 24,411; Referee: Athanasios Giaxos

14 February 2015 24	Olympiacos	3–0	Ergotelis	Piraeus
19:30	Durmaz 71'; Fortounis 73', 90+3'	Report		Stadium: Karaiskakis Stadium; Attendance: 12,812; Referee: Anastasios Papapetrou

22 February 2015 25	Panathinaikos	2–1	Olympiacos	Athens
19:30	Masuaku 49' (o.g.); Petrić 78'	Report	Domínguez 90+6'	Stadium: Leoforos Alexandras Stadium; Attendance: 15,383; Referee: Anastsios Sidiropoulos

19 March 2015 26	Olympiacos	2–0	Asteras Tripolis	Piraeus
16:45	Domínguez 13'; Fortounis 83'	Report		Stadium: Karaiskakis Stadium; Attendance: 12,856; Referee: Michail Voskakis

15 April 2015 27	Panthrakikos	1–3	Olympiacos	Komotini
19:00	Baykara 13'		Benitez 9'; Jara 10'; Milivojević 41'	Stadium: Komotini Municipal Stadium; Attendance: 0 Referee: Charalampos Kalogeropoulos

15 March 2015 28	Olympiacos	2–0	Skoda Xanthi	Piraeus
15:00	Domínguez 57'; Affelay 69'	Report		Stadium: Karaiskakis Stadium; Attendance: 0 Referee: Alexandros Dimitropoulos

22 March 2015 29	Olympiacos	3–0	Kerkyra	Piraeus
17:15	Domínguez 8'; Botía 26'; Jara 48'	Report		Stadium: Karaiskakis Stadium; Attendance: 14,104; Referee: Michail Koukoulakis

5 April 2015 30	PAS Giannina	3–1	Olympiacos	Ioannina
19:30	Ilić 32'; Manias 42'; Acosta 74'	Report	Milivojević 68'	Stadium: Zosimades Stadium; Attendance: 1,513; Referee: Alexandros Aretopulos

19 April 2015 31	Olympiacos	4–0	Levadiakos	Piraeus
19:30	Domínguez 44', 60'; Benítez 55'; Fortounis 90+1'			Stadium: Karaiskakis Stadium; Attendance: 18,211; Referee: Marios Labropoulos

26 April 2015 32	Panionios	2–2	Olympiacos	Nea Smyrni
19:30	Kolovos 25'; Boumale 56'	Report	Mitroglou 66'; Domínguez 68'	Stadium: Nea Smyrni Stadium; Attendance: 1,488; Referee: Stavros Mantalos

3 May 2015 33	Olympiacos	5–0	Kalloni	Piraeus
19:00	Benítez 13'; Fortounis 38'; Domínguez 57'; Mitroglou 80', 85'			Stadium: Karaiskakis Stadium; Attendance: 31,343; Referee: Georgios Kizas

10 May 2015 34	Platanias	1–1	Olympiacos	Chania
19:00	Avlonitis 17' (o.g.)		Jara 87'	Stadium: Perivolia Municipal Stadium; Attendance: 1,896; Referee: Georgios Kominis

1. Matchday 6 vs. PAOK, originally meant to be held on 4 October 2014, was postponed until 4 December 2014 via a direct decision of the Deputy Minister of Culture and Sport, Giannis Andrianos in response to the murder of Ethnikos Piraeus fan Kostas Katsoulis in the municipal Nea Alikarnassos Stadium during the Football League 2 match vs. Irodotos.
2. Matchday 11 vs. Skoda Xanthi, originally meant to be held November 23, 2014, was postponed until January 11, 2015 after the Hellenic Football Federation decided not to appoint referees for all domestic league and cup matches in response to a violent attack versus its member Christoforos Zografos.

=== Greek Football Cup ===
==== Second round – Group A ====
Pos	Team	Pld	W	D	L	GF	GA	GD	Pts	Qualification	OLY	PNN	PNC	FOS
1	Olympiacos	3	2	1	0	4	1	+3	7	Round of 16		1–1	—	—
2	Panionios	3	1	2	0	5	1	+4	5	Round of 16	—		4–0	0–0
3	Panachaiki	3	1	0	2	2	5	−3	3		0–1	—		—
4	Fostiras	3	0	1	2	0	4	−4	1		—	0–2	0–2	

Source: epo.gr

23 September 2014	Panachaiki	0–1	Olympiacos	Patra
19:00		Report	Kargas 74' (o.g.)	Stadium: Pampeloponnisiako Stadium; Referee: Athanasios Giachos (Chios)

29 October 2014	Olympiacos	1–1	Panionios	Piraeus
19:30	Fortounis 13'	Report	Mitropoulos 24'	Stadium: Karaiskakis Stadium; Referee: Stefanos Mantakis (Imathia)

7 January 2015	Fostiras	0–2	Olympiacos	Tavros
19:30		Report	Fortounis 15'; Diamantakos 82'	Stadium: Spyros Gialampidis stadium Referee: Ioannis Papadopoulos (Macedonia)

==== Third round ====
21 January 2015	Tyrnavos	0–3	Olympiacos	Larissa
17:15		Report	Benítez 3', 26'; Milivojević 84'	Stadium: Alcazar Stadium; Referee: Marios Lampropoulos (Elis)

28 January 2015	Olympiacos	8–0 (11–0 agg.)	Tyrnavos	Piraeus
19:30	Milivojević 9', 25'; Diamantakos 11'; Bouchalakis 17'; Durmaz 55', 57', 82'; Fuster 85' (pen.)	Report		Stadium: Karaiskakis Stadium; Referee: Georgios Kominis (Thesprotia)

==== Quarter-finals ====
11 February 2015	Olympiacos	1–1	AEK Athens	Piraeus
19:30	Milivojević 48'	Report	Aravidis 14'	Stadium: Karaiskakis Stadium; Attendance: 30,000; Referee: Marios Lampropoulos (Elis)

11 March 2015	AEK Athens	0–3 (Awarded) (1–4 agg.)	Olympiacos	Athens
19:00		Report	Jara 89'	Stadium: Athens Olympic Stadium; Attendance: 64,256; Referee: Charalampos Kalogeropoulos (Athens)
Note: Match suspended at 90th minute while the score was 0–1.

==== Semi-finals ====
8 April 2015	Apollon Smyrnis	0–3	Olympiacos	Nea Smyrni
19:00		Report		Stadium: Georgios Kamaras Stadium; Referee: Georgios Kyzas (Drama)

29 April 2015	Olympiacos	1–1 (4–1 agg.)	Apollon Smyrnis	Piraeus
18:30	Benítez 84'	Report	Angulo 43'	Stadium: Karaiskakis Stadium; Referee: Stavros Tritsonis (Athens)

==== Final ====
23 May 2015 Final	Olympiacos	3–1	Skoda Xanthi	Athens
20:30	Jara 45+1'; Domínguez 63'; Fortounis 80'	Report	Kapetanos 87'	Stadium: Olympic Stadium; Attendance: 26,300; Referee: Michael Koukoulakis (Heraklion)

=== UEFA Champions League ===
==== Group stage ====
Pos	Team	Pld	W	D	L	GF	GA	GD	Pts	Qualification	ATM	JUV	OLY	MAL
1	(Spain) Atlético Madrid	6	4	1	1	14	3	+11	13	Advance to knockout phase	—	1–0	4–0	5–0
2	(Italy) Juventus	6	3	1	2	7	4	+3	10	Advance to knockout phase	0–0	—	3–2	2–0
3	(Greece) Olympiacos	6	3	0	3	10	13	−3	9	Transfer to Europa League	3–2	1–0	—	4–2
4	(Sweden) Malmö FF	6	1	0	5	4	15	−11	3		0–2	0–2	2–0	—

Source: UEFA
Rules for classification: Group stage tiebreakers

16 September 2014 1	Olympiacos (Greece)	3–2	(Spain) Atlético Madrid	Piraeus, Greece
20:45 CEST (UTC+02:00)	Masuaku 13'; Afellay 31'; Mitroglou 73'	Report	Mandžukić 38'; Griezmann 86'	Stadium: Karaiskakis Stadium; Attendance: 31,946; Referee: Pedro Proença (Portugal)

1 October 2014 2	Malmö FF (Sweden)	2–0	(Greece) Olympiacos	Malmö, Sweden
20:45 CEST (UTC+02:00)	Rosenberg 42', 82'	Report		Stadium: Swedbank Stadion; Attendance: 20,500; Referee: Sergei Karasev (Russia)

22 October 2014 3	Olympiacos (Greece)	1–0	(Italy) Juventus	Piraeus, Greece
20:45 CEST (UTC+02:00)	Kasami 36'	Report		Stadium: Karaiskakis Stadium; Attendance: 31,411; Referee: Milorad Mažić (Serbia)

4 November 2014 4	Juventus (Italy)	3–2	(Greece) Olympiacos	Turin, Italy
20:45 CET (UTC+01:00)	Pirlo 21'; Roberto 65' (o.g.); Pogba 66'	Report	Botía 24'; N'Dinga 61'	Stadium: Juventus Stadium; Attendance: 39,091; Referee: Martin Atkinson (England)

26 November 2014 5	Atlético Madrid (Spain)	4–0	(Greece) Olympiacos	Madrid, Spain
20:45 CET (UTC+01:00)	García 9'; Mandžukić 38', 62', 65'	Report		Stadium: Vicente Calderón; Attendance: 40,121; Referee: Wolfgang Stark (Germany)

9 December 2014 6	Olympiacos (Greece)	4–2	(Sweden) Malmö FF	Piraeus, Greece
20:45 CET (UTC+01:00)	Fuster 22'; Domínguez 63'; Mitroglou 87'; Afellay 90'	Report	Kroon 59'; Rosenberg 81'	Stadium: Karaiskakis Stadium; Attendance: 27,562; Referee: Stéphane Lannoy (France)

=== UEFA Europa League ===
Olympiacos qualified to UEFA Europa League knock-out stage as the 3rd team of Champions League Group A.

==== Round of 32 ====
19 February 2015 First leg	Dnipro Dnipropetrovsk (Ukraine)	2–0	(Greece) Olympiacos	Kyiv, Ukraine
19:00	Kankava 50'; Rotan 54'	Report		Stadium: Olympic Stadium; Attendance: 5,837; Referee: Robert Schörgenhofer (Austria)

26 February 2015 Second leg	Olympiacos (Greece)	2–2 (2–4 agg.)	(Ukraine) Dnipro Dnipropetrovsk	Piraeus, Greece
21:05	Mitroglou 14'; Domínguez 89' (pen.)	Report	Fedetskyi 22'; Kalinić 90+2'	Stadium: Karaiskakis Stadium; Attendance: 24,854; Referee: Danny Makkelie (Netherlands)

== Statistics ==
=== Goal scorers ===
No.	Pos.	Nation	Name	Super League Greece	UEFA Champions League	Greek Cup	Total
7	FW	(Greece)	Kostas Mitroglou	17	3	0	19
11	MF	(Switzerland)	Pajtim Kasami	3	1	0	4
10	MF	(Argentina)	Alejandro Dominguez	4	2	0	6
6	FW	(Netherlands)	Ibrahim Afellay	2	2	0	4
17	FW	(Greece)	Dimitrios Diamantakos	2	0	0	2
24	DF	(Greece)	Anastasios Avlonitis	2	0	0	2
8	MF	(Sweden)	Jimmy Durmaz	2	0	3	5
27	FW	(Paraguay)	Jorge Benítez	5	0	3	8
26	DF	(France)	Arthur Masuaku	0	1	0	1
25	MF	(Greece)	Kostas Fortounis	6	0	2	8
3	DF	(Spain)	Alberto Botía	0	1	0	1
8	MF	(Republic of the Congo)	Delvin N'Dinga	0	1	0	1
-	-	-	Opponent's own Goals	2	0	1	3
TOTAL				44	11	9	64

Last updated: 3 May 2014

== Individual Awards ==
Name	Pos.	Award
(Argentina) Alejandro Domínguez	Attacking Midfielder	Super League Greece Player of the Season; Super League Greece Best Foreign Player; Super League Greece Team of the Season; Olympiacos Goal of the Season
(Greece) Dimitrios Siovas	Centre-back	Super League Greece Team of the Season
(France) Arthur Masuaku	Left-back	Super League Greece Team of the Season
(Norway) Omar Elabdellaoui	Right-back	Super League Greece Team of the Season
