= 2015 Greek Football Cup final =

2015 Greek Cup final
- Event: 2014–15 Greek Football Cup
Olympiacos	Skoda Xanthi
3	1
- Date: 23 May 2015
- Venue: Olympic Stadium, Marousi, Athens
- Man of the Match: Chori Domínguez (Olympiacos)
- Referee: Michael Koukoulakis (Heraklion)
- Attendance: 26,300
- Weather: Fair; 20 °C (68 °F); 73% humidity

The 2015 Greek Cup final was the 71st final of the Greek Cup. It took place on 23 May 2015 at the Olympic Stadium. The contesting teams were Olympiacos and Skoda Xanthi. It was Olympiacos' 38th Greek Cup final in their 90 years of existence and Skoda Xanthi's first-ever Greek Cup final of their 48-year history.

== Venue ==
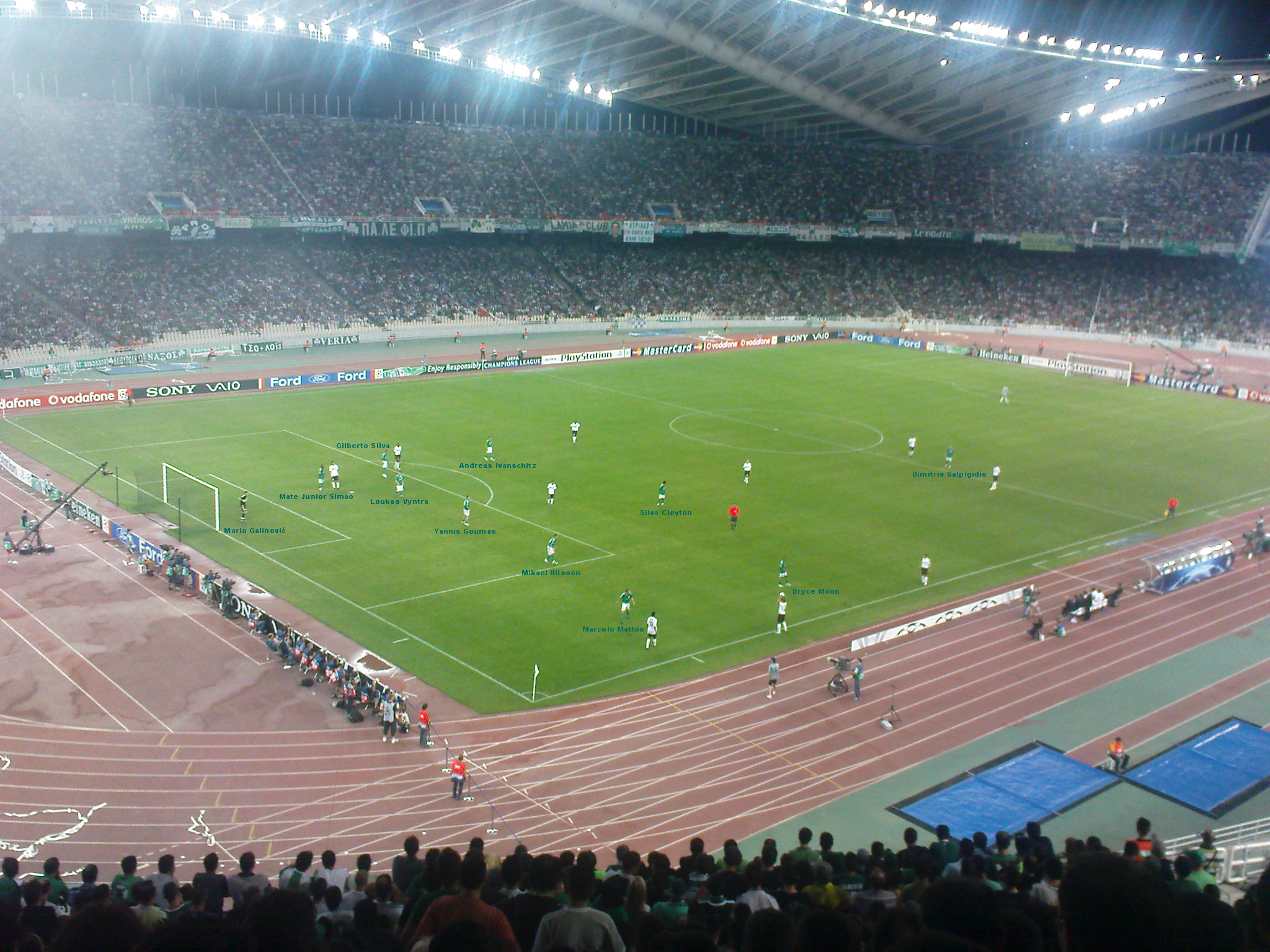
Athens Olympic Stadium.

This was the 22nd Greek Cup final held at the Athens Olympic Stadium, after the 1983, 1984, 1985, 1986, 1987, 1988, 1989, 1990, 1993, 1994, 1995, 1996, 1999, 2000, 2002, 2009, 2010, 2011, 2012, 2013 and 2014 finals.

The Athens Olympic Stadium was built in 1982 and renovated once in 2004. The stadium is used as a venue for AEK Athens and was used for Olympiacos, Panathinaikos and Greece on various occasions. Its current capacity is 69,618 and it hosted three European Cup/UEFA Champions League finals in 1983, 1994 and 2007, a UEFA Cup Winners' Cup final in 1987, the 1991 Mediterranean Games and the 2004 Summer Olympics.

== Background ==
Olympiacos had reached the Greek Cup final thirty seven times, winning twenty six of them. The last time that they had played in a final was in 2013, where they had won against Asteras Tripolis by 3–1 after extra time.

Skoda Xanthi never reached a previous Cup final.

The two teams had never met each other in a Cup final.

== Route to the final ==
Olympiacos				Round	Skoda Xanthi			
Opponent	Result			Group stage	Opponent	Result		
Panachaiki	1–0 (A)			Matchday 1	Niki Volos	1–0 (H)		
Panionios	1–1 (H)			Matchday 2	OFI	0–1 (A)		
Fostiras	2–0 (A)			Matchday 3	Zakynthos	3–1 (H)		
Group A winners: Pos / Team / Pld / Pts; 1 / Olympiacos / 3 / 7; 2 / Panionios / 3 / 5; 3 / Panachaiki / 3 / 3; 4 / Fostiras / 3 / 1; Source: epo.gr				Final standings	Group C runners-up: Pos / Team / Pld / Pts; 1 / OFI / 3 / 7; 2 / Skoda Xanthi / 3 / 6; 3 / Zakynthos / 3 / 4; 4 / Niki Volos / 3 / 0; Source: epo.gr			
Opponent	Agg.	1st leg	2nd leg	Knockout phase	Opponent	Agg.	1st leg	2nd leg
Tyrnavos	11–0	3–0 (A)	8–0 (H)	Round of 16	Panathinaikos	2–1	1–1 (H)	1–0 (A)
AEK Athens	4–1	1–1 (H)	3–0 (w/o) (A)	Quarter-finals	OFI	4–1	1–1 (A)	3–0 (H)
Apollon Smyrnis	4–1	3–0 (A)	1–1 (H)	Semi-finals	Iraklis	2–1	1–0 (A)	1–1 (H)

== Match ==
=== Details ===
23 May 2015
20:30 EEST

Olympiacos	3–1	Skoda Xanthi
Jara 45+1'; Domínguez 63'; Fortounis 80'	Report	Kapetanos 87'

Olympic Stadium, Marousi
Attendance: 26,300
Referee: Michael Koukoulakis (Heraklion)

Οlympiacos	Skoda Xanthi

GK	16	(Spain) Roberto	(yellow card) 69'
RB	30	(Brazil) Leandro Salino	(yellow card) 90+2'
CB	3	(Spain) Alberto Botía	(yellow card) 69' (yellow-red card) 90+1'
CB	23	(Greece) Dimitris Siovas		(substituted off) 84'
LB	26	(Democratic Republic of the Congo) Arthur Masuaku
DM	5	(Serbia) Luka Milivojević
DM	8	(Republic of the Congo) Delvin N'Dinga
RM	19	(Spain) David Fuster (c)		(substituted off) 65'
LM	77	(Togo) Mathieu Dossevi
AM	10	(Argentina) Chori Domínguez		(substituted off) 79'
CF	12	(Argentina) Franco Jara	(yellow card) 72'
Substitutes:
GK	33	(Greece) Lefteris Choutesiotis
DF	29	(Greece) Praxitelis Vouros
MF	9	(Sweden) Jimmy Durmaz
MF	11	(Switzerland) Pajtim Kasami		(substituted on) 84'
MF	25	(Greece) Kostas Fortounis		(substituted on) 65'
FW	7	(Greece) Kostas Mitroglou		(substituted on) 79'
FW	27	(Paraguay) Jorge Benítez
Manager:
(Portugal) Vítor Pereira

GK	82	(Greece) Dimitris Kyriakidis
RB	4	(Greece) Manolis Bertos		(substituted off) 78'
CB	28	(Greece) Dimitrios Goutas
CB	55	(Greece) Christos Karipidis
LB	8	(Brazil) Wallace
DM	15	(Nigeria) Christian Obodo		(substituted off) 79'
DM	17	(Greece) Manolis Papasterianos		(substituted off) 66'
RM	9	(Algeria) Karim Soltani
LM	11	(Argentina) Adrián Lucero
AM	16	(Greece) Theodoros Vasilakakis (c)
CF	20	(Brazil) Cleyton	(yellow card) 32'
Substitutes:
GK	79	(Greece) Nikolaos Anastasopoulos
DF	5	(Greece) Dimos Baxevanidis		(substituted on) 78'
DF	31	(Greece) Christos Lisgaras
MF	14	(Spain) Fernández Walter		(substituted on) 79'
MF	21	(Greece) Kostas Fliskas
MF	24	(Greece) Petros Orfanidis
FW	30	(Greece) Pantelis Kapetanos	(yellow card) 69'	(substituted on) 66'
Manager:
(Romania) Răzvan Lucescu

Man of the Match:
(Argentina) Chori Domínguez (Olympiacos)

Assistant referees:
Christos Akrivos (Athens)
Ilias Alexeas (Messinia)
Additional assistant referees:
Ilias Spathas (Piraeus)
Andreas Pappas (Athens)
Assistant video assistant referee:
Lazaros Dimitriadis (Macedonia)

Match rules

- 90 minutes
- 30 minutes of extra time if necessary
- Penalty shootout if scores still level
- Seven named substitutes
- Maximum of three substitutions
