= Kyriakos Dourekas =

Association football director (b. 1963)

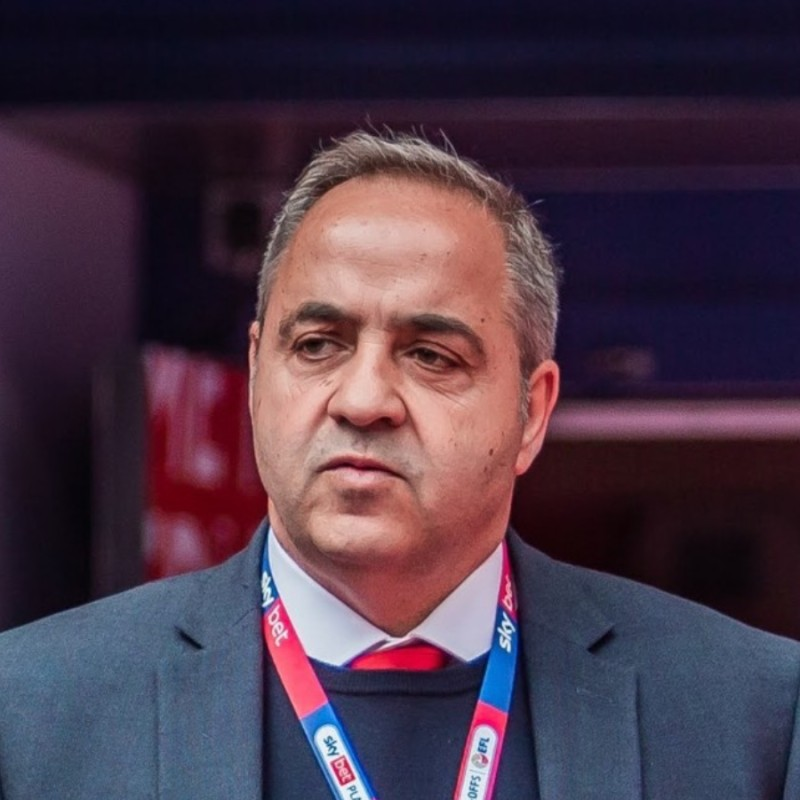

Personal information
- Date of birth: 23 May 1963 (age 63)
- Place of birth: Montreal, Quebec, Canada

Team information
- Current team: Neom SC (club staff)

Kyriakos Dourekas (Greek: Κυριάκος Δουρέκας, born 23 May 1963) is the Sporting Director at Neom SC, a professional football club in Saudi Arabia. Prior to this role, he served as the Director of Football at Nottingham Forest F.C., where he was also a member of the club's board of directors.

== Early life ==
Dourekas was born on 23 May 1963 in Montreal, Quebec. His career in professional football began in the early 1990s. He first worked as IT manager for Olympiacos F.C., before progressing through to become team coordinator. He then held different management roles before taking on a director position in 2007 – a post he held for 11 years until he left for Nottingham.

== Olympiacos F.C. ==
Dourekas joined Olympiacos F.C. in 1993 and spent 25 years with the team in various positions with the most recent being Director of Team Operations. During this period, he has experienced multiple successful campaigns, including 19 league championships and 17 seasons in the UEFA Champions League. He worked alongside managers such as former FC Barcelona head coach Ernesto Valverde, recent AS Monaco FC manager Leonardo Jardim, and the current Fulham F.C. boss Marco Silva.

== Transfer rumours ==
In November 2018, transfer rumours linking Dourekas to Nottingham Forest F.C. started circulating the Greek press.

== Nottingham Forest F.C. ==
On 6 December 2018, Nottingham Forest F.C. officially announced that Kyriakos Dourekas has been appointed as the club's Director of Football. "Nottingham Forest are delighted to confirm that Kyriakos Dourekas has been appointed as the club's Director of Football. He has vast knowledge and experience of European football at an elite level" said part of the official statement.

Since joining Nottingham Forest, Dourekas played a key role in the club's promotion to the Premier League for the first time since 1999.

On March 24, 2022, Nottingham Forest announced that Dourekas has been appointed onto the club's board of directors.

On 13 July 2024, Nottingham Forest F.C. officially announced that Kyriakos Dourekas would leave the club after five successful years of service. During his tenure, Dourekas was instrumental in the club’s progress, particularly in securing important player signings and overseeing the appointment of current head coach Nuno Espírito Santo. These efforts have contributed significantly to Nottingham Forest’s impressive 2024/25 Premier League season, with the team currently occupying the top positions in the Premier League. "I have had 5 special years with Nottingham Forest, and I am incredibly grateful to Mr. Evangelos Marinakis and Mr. Miltiadis Marinakis for their belief in me and the support they have provided during my time at both Olympiacos FC and Nottingham Forest," said Dourekas.

== Neom SC ==
On July 1, 2024, Neom SC appointed Kyriakos Dourekas as the club’s Sport Director. Neom SC competes in the Saudi First Division League, the second tier of the Saudi Arabian football system. Since his arrival, Dourekas has been responsible for multiple major signings that have significantly strengthened the squad. As of February 18, 2025, the team is at the top of the Saudi First Division League, positioning itself as a strong contender for promotion.

== Additional sources ==
- https://edoelos.blogspot.com/2018/06/blog-post_691.html
- https://www.djazairess.com/fr/lebuteur/42333
- https://www.protothema.gr/sports/article/655950/dourekas-milousan-gia-20-lepta-me-ton-ekprosopo-tis-aek-oi-diaitites/
- https://www.to10.gr/podosfero/europa-league/356146/o-koulis-dourekas-episkefthike-gipedo-tis-bernli-pics/
