= Delvin N'Dinga =

Congolese footballer (born 1988)

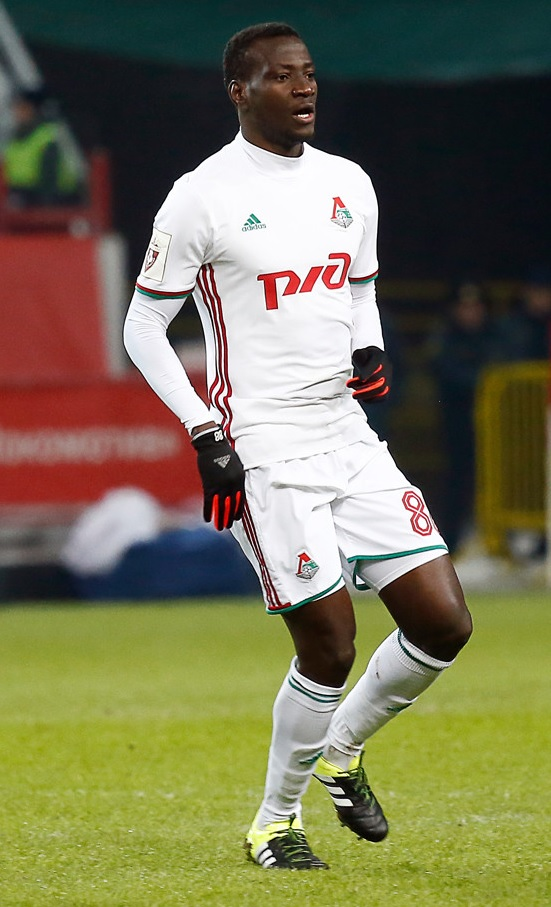
- N'Dinga with Lokomotiv Moscow in 2016

Personal information
- Full name: Delvin Chanel N'Dinga
- Date of birth: 14 March 1988 (age 38)
- Place of birth: Pointe Noire, Republic of the Congo
- Height: 1.81 m (5 ft 11 in)
- Position: Midfielder

Youth career
- 2002: CNFF
- 2003–2005: Diables Noirs

Senior career*
Years	Team	Apps	(Gls)
2005–2008	Auxerre B	57	(3)
2008–2012	Auxerre	78	(2)
2012–2016	Monaco	27	(0)
2013–2015	→ Olympiacos (loan)	36	(1)
2015–2016	→ Lokomotiv Moscow (loan)	24	(0)
2016–2017	Lokomotiv Moscow	9	(0)
2017–2019	Sivasspor	49	(3)
2020	Antalyaspor	6	(0)
2021	Panetolikos	14	(1)
2023	Balzan	8	(1)

International career
2005–2007	Congo U21	8	(1)
2007–2021	Congo	56	(1)
- * Club domestic league appearances and goals

Delvin Chanel N'Dinga (born 14 March 1988) is a Congolese former professional footballer who played as a midfielder.

== Club career ==
=== Auxerre ===
N'Dinga began his career with CNFF then joined Diables Noirs in 2003. In July 2005, he Diables Noirs to sign in Europe with French club Auxerre.

In the 2011–12 season, N'Dinga was linked with a move to Lyon as the replacement for Jérémy Toulalan, who joined Spanish side Málaga. Auxerre and Lyon were in the process of negotiating a transfer for Ndinga for €7 million, with Ndinga to sign a four-year contract with Lyon. N'Dinga said a move to Lyon interested him: "It would be a good challenge for me, the opportunity to pass a course, While there is a chance that I play in this club, I will not hesitate. There is Lyon who has, then yes, it m? Interested!" However, Auxerre club president Gérard Bourgoin refused to sell Ndinga, having rejected several offers from Lyon. The negotiations continued throughout the summer transfer window until N'Dinga signed a contract extension set to keep him at Auxerre until 2015. Shortly after, N'Dinga expressed sadness of not join Lyon, saying, "It takes time, honestly thought I leave. It hurt me. I try to focus quickly find my level."

=== Monaco ===
Following Auxerre's relegation from Ligue 1 after the 2011–12 season, N'Dinga joined Ligue 2 side Monaco in July 2012 in a €6 million transfer deal.

=== Olympiacos ===
Following his two league appearances at Monaco in the 2013–14 season, but on 31 August 2013, N'Dinga left the club to join Greek champions Olympiacos on loan, with an option to make the move permanent next summer with a fee of €3 million. He started a second loan spell with Olympiacos in July 2014. Olympiacos will buy Delvin with a mark of €3.2 million from the Monegasque team. N'Dinga is likely to head back to France over the summer, after spending the last two seasons on loan at Olympiakos from Monaco but according to reports in France he will possibly to return to League 1 in the summer transfer window. N'Dinga will not renew his contract with Monaco and it looks like that Saint-Étienne is in pole position to sign him. Apart from Saint-Etienne, Rennes, Lille and Caen also expressed their interested in the Congolese defensive midfielder.

=== Lokomotiv Moscow ===
After joining Russian club Lokomotiv Moscow on loan for the 2015–16 season, N'Dinga's move from Monaco was made permanent on 11 May 2016.

=== Sivasspor ===
On 7 September 2017, N'Dinga signed a two-year contract with Turkish club Sivasspor.

== International career ==
N'Dinga made his first cap for Congo national team at the WCQ match against Sudan on 8 June 2007. He represented the national team at the 2015 Africa Cup of Nations, where his team advanced to the quarterfinals.

== Career statistics ==
=== Club ===
As of 14 March 2019

Appearances and goals by club, season and competition
Club	Season	League			National cup		League cup		Continental		Total	
Club	Season	Division	Apps	Goals	Apps	Goals	Apps	Goals	Apps	Goals	Apps	Goals
Auxerre	2008–09	Ligue 1	3	0	0	0	0	0	—		3	0
Auxerre	2009–10	Ligue 1	26	1	2	0	0	0	—		28	1
Auxerre	2010–11	Ligue 1	26	0	0	0	2	0	7	0	35	0
Auxerre	2011–12	Ligue 1	23	1	0	0	1	0	—		24	1
Auxerre	Total		78	2	2	0	3	0	7	0	90	2
Auxerre II	2011–12	Championnat de France Amateur	1	0	—		—		—		1	0
Monaco	2012–13	Ligue 2	25	0	1	0	2	0	—		28	0
Monaco	2013–14	Ligue 1	2	0	0	0	0	0	—		2	0
Monaco	Total		27	0	1	0	2	0	0	0	30	0
Olympiacos (loan)	2013–14	Super League Greece	19	0	8	1	—		6	0	33	1
Olympiacos (loan)	2014–15	Super League Greece	17	1	5	0	—		6	1	28	2
Olympiacos (loan)	Total		36	1	13	1	0	0	12	1	61	3
Lokomotiv Moscow (loan)	2015–16	Russian Premier League	24	0	1	0	—		8	0	33	0
Lokomotiv Moscow	2016–17	Russian Premier League	9	0	1	0	—		—		10	0
Lokomotiv Moscow	2017–18	Russian Premier League	0	0	0	0	—		—		0	0
Lokomotiv Moscow	Total		33	0	2	0	0	0	8	0	43	0
Sivasspor	2017–18	Süper Lig	27	2	2	0	—		—		29	2
Sivasspor	2018–19	Süper Lig	18	1	0	0	—		—		14	1
Sivasspor	Total		45	3	2	0	0	0	0	0	43	3
Career total			220	6	20	1	5	0	27	1	268	8

=== International ===
Scores and results list Congo's goal tally first.

#	Date	Venue	Opponent	Score	Result	Competition
1.	14 November 2015	Addis-Abeba, Ethiopia	Ethiopia	1–3	3–4	2018 FIFA World Cup qualification

== Honours ==
Monaco

- Ligue 2: 2012–13

Olympiacos

- Super League Greece: 2013–14, 2014–15
- Greek Cup: 2014–15

Lokomotiv Moscow

- Russian Cup: 2016–17
