= Georgios Manthatis =

Greek footballer (born 1997)

Giorgos Manthatis
Personal information
- Date of birth: 11 May 1997 (age 29)
- Place of birth: Sofia, Bulgaria
- Height: 1.74 m (5 ft 8 1/2 in)
- Position: Right wing-back

Team information
- Current team: Levadiakos
- Number: 14

Youth career
- 2012–2016: Olympiacos

Senior career*
Years	Team	Apps	(Gls)
2016–2020	Olympiacos	11	(1)
2017–2018	→ PAS Giannina (loan)	27	(0)
2018–2019	→ Panionios (loan)	15	(0)
2019–2020	→ Anorthosis (loan)	18	(0)
2021	Panetolikos	11	(1)
2022–2025	Athens Kallithea	79	(2)
2023	→ KTP (loan)	10	(0)
2025–	Levadiakos	20	(1)

International career^{‡}
2013–2014	Greece U17	7	(2)
2014–2016	Greece U19	13	(1)
2016–2018	Greece U21	13	(3)
- * Club domestic league appearances and goals as of 20 September 2026 ‡ National team caps and goals as of 15 October 2018

Georgios Manthatis (Greek: Γεώργιος Μανθάτης; born 11 May 1997) is a Greek professional footballer who plays as a winger for Super League club Levadiakos.

== Club career ==
=== Olympiacos ===
Manthatis began his career at Olympiacos and broke into the first team in the 2016/17 season as the Reds won the Super League 1 championship and reached the Round of 16 of the UEFA Europa League, making 18 domestic appearances and nine European appearances.

On 15 December 2016, Manthatis scored the only goal in a Greek Cup preliminary round match against Sparti. It was the first goal with the club in all competitions.

On 18 December 2016, he made his debut in the Super League as a substitute, in a 3–1 home win against Panetolikos. On 21 January 2017, he scored, as a substitute, his first Super League goal in a 2–0 home win game against Xanthi.

He would go out on a series of loans to PAS Giannina, Panionios, Anorthosis, before eventually leaving Olympiacos in 2020.

=== Panetolikos ===
On 23 December 2020, Manthatis joined Panetolikos. In his debut, he scored helping to a 2–1 home win against OFI.

=== Athens Kallithea ===
Manthatis joined AKFC in January 2022. Playing primarily as a right-back, he quickly established himself as a key figure in the team that finished in second place in the 2021–22 season.

==== Loan to KTP ====
In January 2023, AKFC loaned Manthatis to Finnish club Kotkan Työväen Palloilijat (KTP) in top-tier Veikkausliiga. Manthatis would make 17 total league and cup appearances for KTP with one goal and one assist, before being recalled by AKFC in July 2023.

== International career ==
On 15 March 2017, as an Olympiacos youngster Manthatis' international call in Greece national football team was a big surprise by Michael Skibbe for Greece's crucial qualifier next week against Belgium.

== Career statistics ==
=== Club ===
As of 19 May 2025

Club	Season	League			Cup (Note: Includes Greek Cup, Cypriot Cup and Suomen Cup)		Continental		Other		Total	
Club	Season	Division	Apps	Goals	Apps	Goals	Apps	Goals	Apps	Goals	Apps	Goals
Olympiacos	2016–17	Super League Greece	0	0	2	0	0	0	—		2	0
Olympiacos	2016–17	Super League Greece	11	1	7	1	9 (Note: Includes UEFA Europa League)	0	—		27	2
Olympiacos	Total		11	1	9	1	9	0	—		29	2
PAS Giannina (loan)	2017–18	Super League Greece	27	0	7	0	—		—		34	0
Panionios (loan)	2018–19	Super League Greece	15	0	3	0	—		—		18	0
Anorthosis Famagusta (loan)	2019–20	Cypriot First Division	18	0	4	0	—		—		22	0
Panetolikos	2020–21	Super League Greece	11	1	1	0	—		—		12	1
Athens Kallithea	2021–22	Super League Greece 2	20	1	2	0	—		—		22	1
Athens Kallithea	2022–23	Super League Greece 2	5	0	1	0	—		—		6	0
Athens Kallithea	2023–24	Super League Greece 2	26	1	2	0	—		—		28	1
Athens Kallithea	2024–25	Super League Greece	27	0	1	1	—		—		28	1
Athens Kallithea	Total		78	2	6	1	—		—		84	3
KTP (loan)	2023	Veikkausliiga	10	0	3	1	–		4 (Note: Includes Finnish League Cup)	0	17	1
Career total			170	4	33	3	9	0	4	0	206	7

== Honours ==
Olympiacos

- Super League Greece: 2016–17
