= Anastasios Karamanos =

Greek footballer (born 1990)

Tasos Karamanos
Personal information
- Full name: Anastasios Karamanos
- Date of birth: 21 September 1990 (age 36)
- Place of birth: Aspropyrgos, Attica, Greece
- Height: 1.85 m (6 ft 1 in)
- Position: Forward

Team information
- Current team: Asteras Magoula
- Number: 11

Senior career*
Years	Team	Apps	(Gls)
2008–2009	Enosis Aspropyrgos	30	(17)
2009–2011	Asteras Magoula	44	(26)
2011–2015	Atromitos	122	(14)
2015–2018	Olympiacos	0	(0)
2015–2016	→ Panionios (loan)	24	(5)
2016–2017	→ Feirense (loan)	32	(6)
2017	→ Rio Ave (loan)	11	(1)
2018	→ Feirense (loan)	14	(0)
2018–2023	Lamia	135	(8)
2024–2025	Mandraikos	5	(0)
2025–	Asteras Magoula		
- * Club domestic league appearances and goals as of 12 May 2023

Anastasios "Tasos" Karamanos (Greek: Αναστάσιος "Τάσος" Καραμάνος, born 21 September 1990) is a Greek professional footballer who plays as a forward for Gamma Ethniki club Asteras Magoula.

== Career ==
He started his career in 2008 with local team Aspropyrgos, and the following year he signed for Delta Ethniki side Asteras Magoula. He lifted the Greek Amateur Cup in 2011 with Asteras.

In the summer of 2011, he signed for Atromitos. He made his debut in the Super League Greece during a home game against Levadiakos, coming as a substitute in the 74th minute. During the 2014 summer transfer window, he signed a contract with Olympiacos involving a 12-month loan back length clause to Atromitos.

In the summer of 2015, he signed another year-long loan to Panionios on loan from Olympiacos. He finished the season having 36 appearances (6 goals, 2 assists) in all competitions.

On 1 August 2016 Karamanos moved to Portuguese Primeira Liga outfit Feirense on another season-long deal. On Matchday 1 of the Primeira Liga on August 26, he netted his first goal contributing to a 2–0 away victory over Estoril. On 13 September 2016, he scored a brace to help his team achieve a 2–1 home win against Tondela. Karamanos' fourth and final goal for Feirense arrived on 31 October, after an assist from Jean Sony Alcénat, in what was the only Feirense goal in the team's 1–1 away draw against Chaves. On 30 April 2017, he scored with a wonderful finish after an assist of Vítor Bruno, opening the score in a 2–1 home win against Marítimo.

On 2 June 2017, according to Portuguese newspaper "A Bola," Olympiacos offers Karamanos to Vitória de Guimarães to persuade the Portuguese club to make back to its demands and to resolve the issue with Pedro Martins clause, in order to join Greek champions as the new head coach. On 14 July 2017, Karamanos will continue his career in Portugal signing a long season contract with Primeira Liga club Rio Ave on loan from Olympiakos. His contract has a buying clause of €1.5 million.

On 21 January 2018, Feirense officially announced their deal with Karamanos. The 28-year-old player returned in Santa Maria da Feira based club after his last season there on loan from Olympiakos until the forthcoming summer. After a rather mediocre season, Karamanos besides the fact that has a contract with Olympiakos, is in search of a club as he is not in the plans of the new coach of Olympiakos Pedro Martins. On 28 August 2018, after almost four years without having an appearance with Olympiakos, Karamanos mutually solved his contract with the club, seeking the next club in his career.

On 30 August 2018, one day before the end of the transfer window, Karamanos signed a contract with Lamia. His first goal in the league came in a 3–1 away win against OFI, after he received a wonderful through ball from Facundo Bertoglio and chipped Giorgos Strezos to secure the win, on 18 February 2019. On 10 March 2019, he scored with a header in a 1–1 home draw against PAS Giannina. On 30 March 2019, he scored an early goal sealing a vital 1–0 home win game against Panionios.

== Career statistics ==
As of 29 January 2022

Club	Season	League			National Cup		League Cup		Continental		Total	
Club	Season	Division	Apps	Goals	Apps	Goals	Apps	Goals	Apps	Goals	Apps	Goals
Atromitos	2011–12	Super League Greece	12	0	4	0	—		—		16	0
Atromitos	2012–13	Super League Greece	21	3	2	1	—		2 (Note: Appearance(s) in UEFA Europa League)	0	25	4
Atromitos	2013–14	Super League Greece	34	5	5	4	—		1	0	40	9
Atromitos	Total		67	8	11	5	—		3	0	81	13
Atromitos (loan)	2014–15	Super League Greece	26	3	2	0	—		2	0	30	3
Panionios (loan)	2015–16	Super League Greece	30	5	6	1	—		—		36	6
Feirense (loan)	2016–17	Primeira Liga	32	6	2	0	2	1	—		36	7
Rio Ave (loan)	2017–18	Primeira Liga	8	0	1	1	2	0	—		11	1
Feirense (loan)	2017–18	Primeira Liga	12	0	—		—		—		12	0
Lamia	2018–19	Super League Greece	27	3	8	1	—		—		35	4
Lamia	2019–20	Super League Greece	30	1	2	0	—		—		32	1
Lamia	2020–21	Super League Greece	30	2	0	0	—		—		30	2
Lamia	2021–22	Super League Greece	12	1	2	0	—		—		14	1
Lamia	Total		99	7	12	1	—		—		111	8
Career total			274	29	34	8	4	1	5	0	317	38

== Honours ==
=== Club ===
Atromitos

- Greek Cup runner-up: 2011–12
