= Alekos Rantos =

Greek footballer and coach

Personal information
- Full name: Alexandros Rantos
- Date of birth: 29 October 1966 (age 59)
- Place of birth: Katerini, Greece
- Position: Goalkeeper

Youth career
- 1982–1983: Pierikos

Senior career*
| Years | Team | Apps | (Gls) |
| 1983–1988 | Pierikos | | |
| 1988–1998 | Olympiacos | 71 | (0) |
| 1998–1999 | Panelefsiniakos | 27 | (0) |
| 1999–2001 | PAS Giannina | 20 | (0) |
| 2001–2002 | Apollon Kalamarias | 32 | (0) |

International career
| 1987 | Greece U21 | | |

Managerial career
- 2002–2005: Apollon Kalamarias (Goalkeeper Coach)
- 2005–2016: Olympiacos (Goalkeeper Coach)
- 2017: Olympiacos (Goalkeeper Coach)
- 2019–: Aris (Goalkeeper Coach)
- * Club domestic league appearances and goals

Alekos Rantos (Greek: Αλέκος Ράντος; born on 29 October 1966) is a Greek former professional footballer who played as a goalkeeper and he is currently the goalkeeping coach of Aris.

== Career ==
Rantos won the Greek championship with Olympiacos two times, on 1997 and 1998. He also played for Panelefsiniakos, PAS Giannina and Apollon Kalamarias. He played as a goalkeeper.
