= Jorge Benítez (Paraguayan footballer) =

Paraguayan footballer (born 1992)

Personal information
- Full name: Jorge Daniel Benítez Guillén
- Date of birth: 2 September 1992 (age 34)
- Place of birth: Ñemby, Paraguay
- Height: 1.82 m (6 ft 0 in)
- Position: Forward

Team information
- Current team: Deportivo Capiatá
- Number: 27

Senior career*
Years	Team	Apps	(Gls)
2010–2014	Guaraní	53	(20)
2013	→ Rubio Ñu (loan)	16	(2)
2014–2016	Olympiacos	20	(6)
2015–2016	→ Cruz Azul (loan)	25	(11)
2016–2017	Cruz Azul	31	(7)
2017–2020	Monterrey	22	(1)
2018–2020	→ Cerro Porteño (loan)	35	(14)
2020	Sol de América	6	(2)
2021–2022	Deportes La Serena	17	(4)
2022	Veraguas United	7	(3)
2022	→ Platense (loan)	14	(3)
2023	Colón	25	(3)
2024–2025	Sportivo Luqueño	27	(7)
2025	SA Bulo Bulo	0	(0)
2025	Paysandu	23	(3)
2026–	Deportivo Capiatá	26	(13)

International career
2014–2017	Paraguay	12	(1)
- * Club domestic league appearances and goals as of 15 October 2023

Jorge Daniel Benítez Guillén (born 2 September 1992) is a Paraguayan professional footballer who plays as a forward for Deportivo Capiatá.

== Career ==
=== First stint at Guaraní ===
Benítez made his first professional appearance for Guaraní of the Paraguayan Primera División on 30 May 2010 against Olimpia. He came on as a 68th-minute substitute for Julián Benítez as Guaraní won 2–1.

=== Rubio Ñu ===
After receiving little playing time at Guaraní, Benítez made the move to Rubio Ñu in 2013. He scored his 2 March 2013 against Olimpia. His goal coming in the 74th minute to help make the match end 1–1.

=== Back at Guaraní ===
Benítez returned to Guaraní before the Clausura in 2013. He scored his first goal for the club in his first game back on 8 August 2013 against Oriente Petrolero in the Copa Sudamericana. He came on as a 78th-minute substitute and scored in the 93rd minute to give Guaraní a 4–1 victory. He scored his first double for the club on 6 June 2014 in the league against Cerro Porteño. His first goal came in the 1st minute while his second came in the 50th minute as Guaraní drew the match 5–5.

=== Olympiacos ===
On August 18, 2014, Benítez was signed by Olympiacos for $3.4 million, with 15% economic rights retained by his former club Club Guaraní. At his first season in the club, he did not play as much as he thought he would. However, he showed some of his enviable skills scoring some really beautiful goals.

On 26 July 2015, Jorge 'Conejo' Benitez, cameras and reporters rushed terrified to take the first impressions of the former player of Olympiacos who is being surrounded by recorder and merely he held microphones and said: "I come to make goals"'. Benitez will make the appropriate medical examinations and will sign his six months contract with the Mexican club Cruz Azul, on loan from Olympiacos. Eventually, a day later, Cruz Azul announced in its official website the lending of the player for the Apertura 2015.

On 26 March 2016, Olympiacos striker Benitez, who is currently on loan at Cruz Azul, is unlikely to return to the Greek giants. The Paraguayan striker is enjoying a great form at the Mexican club and rumours claimed that he could be on his way to Olympiacos when his loan expires. However, it is believed that Benitez does not wish to return to the Greek champions as he is very happy and settled in Cruz Azul. On 28 March 2016, Olympiacos have accepted a bid in the region of €4 million from Cruz Azul for the services of Jorge Benitez. Benitez was on loan at the Mexican club from Olympiacos as the Greek giants were ready to listen to offers.

=== Cruz Azul ===
On 14 May 2016, the Mexican club officially announced the acquisition of the Paraguayan international striker.

=== Monterrey ===
On 7 June 2017, the Paraguayan forward arrives at Rayados from Cruz Azul, a club in which he played for two seasons. The transfer takes place in definitive purchase by the Regio group, which also announced the departure of Edwin Cardona to Pachuca.

=== Club Sol de América ===
In September 2020, he signed for Club Sol de América.

=== Deportes La Serena ===
On 15 April 2021, he signed for Deportes La Serena.

=== Veraguas United Football Club ===
On 17 March 2022, he signed for Veraguas United Football Club.

=== Colón de Santa Fe ===
On 8 January 2023, Benitez was transferred to Colón de Santa Fe of the Argentinian Primera Division.

=== Sportivo Luqueño ===
On 1 January 2024 Benitez signed for Sportivo Luqueño.

== International ==
Benítez made his international debut on 1 June 2014 against France. He came on as a 65th-minute substitute for Roque Santa Cruz as Paraguay drew the match 1–1.

== Honours ==
Olympiacos

- Super League Greece: 2014–15
- Greek Cup: 2014–15

== Career statistics ==
As of 17 September 2017

Club	Season	League			League cup		National cup		International		Total	
Club	Season	Division	Apps	Goals	Apps	Goals	Apps	Goals	Apps	Goals	Apps	Goals
Guaraní	2010	Paraguayan Primera División	5	0	–		–		0	0	5	0
Guaraní	2011	Paraguayan Primera División	5	0	–		–		0	0	5	0
Guaraní	2012	Paraguayan Primera División	5	0	–		–		0	0	5	0
Guaraní	2013	Paraguayan Primera División	17	3	–		–		2	1	19	4
Guaraní	2014	Paraguayan Primera División	21	17	–		–		1	1	22	18
Guaraní	Total		53	20	–		–		3	2	56	22
Rubio Ñu	2013	Paraguayan Primera División	16	2	–		–		0	0	16	2
Olympiacos	2014–15	Super League Greece	20	6	–		5	3	2	0	27	9
Cruz Azul	2015–16	Liga MX	25	11	–		6	3	–		31	14
Cruz Azul	2016–17	Liga MX	31	7	–		10	3	–		41	10
Cruz Azul	Total		56	18	–		16	6	–		72	24
Monterrey	2017–18	Liga MX	8	1	–		4	2	–		12	3
Career total			153	47	0	0	25	11	5	2	183	60
