= Georgios Strezos =

Greek association football player (born 1995)

Giorgos Strezos
Personal information
- Full name: Georgios Strezos
- Date of birth: 6 July 1995 (age 31)
- Place of birth: Chalkidona, Greece
- Height: 1.84 m (6 ft 1/2 in)
- Position: Goalkeeper

Youth career
- –2013: P.A.O.K.
- 2013–2014: Olympiacos Piraeus

Senior career*
| Years | Team | Apps | (Gls) |
| 2014–2016 | Olympiacos Piraeus | 0 | (0) |
| 2015–2016 | → Panachaiki (loan) | 24 | (0) |
| 2016–2017 | Panegialios | 14 | (0) |
| 2017–2019 | O.F.I. Iraklio | 71 | (0) |
| 2019–2020 | Willem II Tilburg | 0 | (0) |
| 2021–2023 | Kallithea | 41 | (0) |
| 2023–2025 | Omonia 29M | 39 | (0) |

International career^{‡}
| – | Greece U17 | 5 | (0) |
| – | Greece U18 | 3 | (0) |
| 2013–2014 | Greece U19 | 9 | (0) |
- * Club domestic league appearances and goals as of June 1, 2025 ‡ National team caps and goals as of August 29, 2025

Giorgos Strezos (Greek: Γιώργος Στρέζος; born 6 July 1995) is a Greek professional association football player who plays as a goalkeeper.

== Career ==
On 5 June 2019, Strezos solved his contract with O.F.I. Iraklio, and on 25 September 2019, signed with Eredivisie club Willem II Tilburg for a year (with an option for an additional year) for an undisclosed fee.

== Career statistics ==
=== Club ===
As of match played 14 March 2025

Appearances and goals by club, season and competition
| Club | Season | League | | | National cup | | Continental | | Other | | Total | |
| Club | Season | Division | Apps | Goals | Apps | Goals | Apps | Goals | Apps | Goals | Apps | Goals |
|---|---|---|---|---|---|---|---|---|---|---|---|---|
| Olympiacos Piraeus | 2014–15 | Super League Greece | 0 | 0 | 0 | 0 | 0 | 0 | — | | 0 | 0 |
| Olympiacos Piraeus | 2015–16 | Super League Greece | 0 | 0 | 0 | 0 | 0 | 0 | — | | 0 | 0 |
| Olympiacos Piraeus | Total | | 0 | 0 | 0 | 0 | 0 | 0 | — | | 0 | 0 |
| Panachaiki (loan) | 2015–16 | Football League Greece | 21 | 0 | 3 | 0 | — | | — | | 24 | 0 |
| Panegialios | 2016–17 | Football League Greece | 13 | 0 | 1 | 0 | — | | — | | 14 | 0 |
| O.F.I. Iraklio | 2016–17 | Football League Greece | 15 | 0 | 0 | 0 | — | | — | | 15 | 0 |
| O.F.I. Iraklio | 2017–18 | Football League Greece | 31 | 0 | 3 | 0 | — | | — | | 34 | 0 |
| O.F.I. Iraklio | 2018–19 | Super League Greece | 21 | 0 | 1 | 0 | — | | 0 | 0 | 22 | 0 |
| O.F.I. Iraklio | Total | | 67 | 0 | 4 | 0 | — | | 0 | 0 | 71 | 0 |
| Willem II Tilburg | 2019–20 | Eredivisie | 0 | 0 | 0 | 0 | — | | — | | 0 | 0 |
| Kallithea | 2021–22 | Super League Greece 2 | 29 | 0 | 1 | 0 | — | | — | | 30 | 0 |
| Kallithea | 2022–23 | Super League Greece 2 | 13 | 0 | 1 | 0 | — | | — | | 14 | 0 |
| Kallithea | Total | | 42 | 0 | 2 | 0 | — | | — | | 44 | 0 |
| Omonia 29M | 2023–24 | Cypriot Second Division | 28 | 0 | 0 | 0 | — | | — | | 28 | 0 |
| Omonia 29M | 2024–25 | Cypriot First Division | 8 | 0 | 1 | 0 | — | | — | | 9 | 0 |
| Omonia 29M | Total | | 36 | 0 | 1 | 0 | — | | — | | 37 | 0 |
| Career total | | | 179 | 0 | 11 | 0 | 0 | 0 | 0 | 0 | 190 | 0 |

== Honours ==
=== Olympiacos Piraeus ===
- Super League: 2014–15

=== O.F.I. Iraklio ===
- Football League: 2017–18
