= List of Greek football transfers winter 2019–20 =

This is a list of Greek football transfers for the 2019–20 winter transfer window. Only transfers featuring Super League 1 and Super League 2 are listed.

Previous window: summer 2019. Next window: summer 2020.

== Super League 1 ==
Note: Flags indicate national team as has been defined under FIFA eligibility rules. Players may hold more than one non-FIFA nationality.

=== PAOK ===
In:

No.	Pos.	Nation	Player

Out:

No.	Pos.	Nation	Player
78	FW	GRE	Antonis Gaitanidis (on loan to Apollon Smyrnis)
1	GK	ARG	Rodrigo Rey (on loan to (Argentina) Godoy Cruz, previously on loan at (Mexico) Pachuca)
—	FW	GRE	Giannis Mystakidis (to (Netherlands) De Graafschap, previously on loan at Volos)

=== Olympiacos ===
In:

No.	Pos.	Nation	Player
26	MF	POR	Cafú (from (Poland) Legia Warsaw)
10	FW	TUR	Emre Mor (on loan from (Spain) Celta Vigo, previously on loan at Galatasaray)
99	FW	EGY	Ahmed Hassan (on loan from (Portugal) Braga)
—	MF	CYP	Ioannis Kosti (from (Cyprus) Nea Salamina)
—	FW	SRB	Nikola Čumić (from (Serbia) Radnički Niš)

Out:

No.	Pos.	Nation	Player
6	MF	ALG	Yassine Benzia (loan return to (France) Lille)
9	FW	ESP	Miguel Ángel Guerrero (on loan to (Spain) Leganés)
10	MF	POR	Daniel Podence (to (England) Wolverhampton Wanderers)
15	DF	SRB	Svetozar Marković (on loan to AEL)
20	DF	TUN	Yassine Meriah (on loan to (Turkey) Kasımpaşa)
23	DF	GRE	Leonardo Koutris (on loan to (Spain) Mallorca)
51	FW	GRE	Alexandros Voilis (on loan to (Portugal) Casa Pia)
—	MF	CYP	Ioannis Kosti (on loan to (Cyprus) Nea Salamina)
—	FW	SRB	Nikola Čumić (on loan to (Serbia) Radnički Niš)
—	DF	GRE	Giannis Masouras (on loan to AEL, previously on loan at Panionios)
—	DF	BIH	Nemanja Nikolić (on loan to (Bosnia and Herzegovina) Mladost Doboj Kakanj, previously on loan at (Serbia) Radnički Niš)
—	FW	GRE	Fiorin Durmishaj (to Aris, previously on loan at (Belgium) Waasland-Beveren)

=== AEK Athens ===
In:

No.	Pos.	Nation	Player
5	MF	POL	Damian Szymański (on loan from (Russia) Akhmat Grozny)
11	FW	ARG	Sergio Araujo (on loan from (Spain) Las Palmas)

Out:

No.	Pos.	Nation	Player
11	FW	SRB	Miloš Deletić (on loan to Asteras Tripolis)
12	MF	POR	Francisco Geraldes (loan return to (Portugal) Sporting CP)
22	MF	POR	David Simão (on loan to (Israel) Hapoel Be'er Sheva)
39	MF	ESP	Erik Morán (to (Spain) Numancia)
77	MF	GRE	Christos Giousis (on loan to Platanias)
—	DF	GRE	Georgios Kornezos (on loan to Ionikos, previously on loan at Volos)
—	MF	GRE	Paris Babis (on loan to Platanias, previously on loan at Kalamata)

=== Atromitos ===
In:

No.	Pos.	Nation	Player
7	MF	BIH	Azer Bušuladžić (from (Poland) Arka Gdynia)
11	FW	BEL	Nill De Pauw (from (Turkey) Çaykur Rizespor)
17	MF	CHI	Bryan Rabello (from (Chile) Universidad de Concepción)

Out:

No.	Pos.	Nation	Player
7	FW	BRA	Farley Rosa (to Panetolikos)
17	FW	HUN	Roland Ugrai (released)
30	MF	GRE	Nikos Lazaridis (to Aiolikos)
—	FW	GRE	Antonis Trimmatis (on loan to Ethnikos Piraeus)
—	DF	GRE	Giorgos Lolos (to Ethnikos Piraeus, previously on loan at Thesprotos)

=== Aris ===
In:

No.	Pos.	Nation	Player
96	FW	GRE	Fiorin Durmishaj (from Olympiacos, previously on loan at (Belgium) Waasland-Beveren)

Out:

No.	Pos.	Nation	Player
22	DF	GRE	Dimitris Konstantinidis (released)
91	DF	ESP	Álex Menéndez (released)

=== Panionios ===
In:

No.	Pos.	Nation	Player

Out:

No.	Pos.	Nation	Player
2	MF	GRE	Giannis Maniatis (released)
31	DF	GRE	Giannis Masouras (loan return to Olympiacos)

=== Lamia ===
In:

No.	Pos.	Nation	Player
6	MF	SEN	Ibrahima Niasse (from (Azerbaijan) Gabala)
9	FW	BRA	Miguel Bianconi (from Platanias)
40	GK	FRA	Devis Epassy (from Levadiakos)
77	MF	ARG	Leonardo Villalba (from (Argentina) Central Córdoba)

Out:

No.	Pos.	Nation	Player
1	GK	GRE	Marcos Vellidis (to (Cyprus) Olympiakos Nicosia)
9	FW	BRA	Thuram (to (Turkey) Konyaspor)
20	MF	GRE	Dimitris Anakoglou (to Panachaiki)
77	FW	GRE	Vasilis Kostikas (on loan to Atalanti)
88	MF	GRE	Alexandros Karagiannis (to Veria)
95	MF	BRA	Lucas Ramos (released)

=== Panathinaikos ===
In:

No.	Pos.	Nation	Player
20	MF	MAR	Yassin Ayoub (from (Netherlands) Feyenoord)
22	MF	HUN	Dominik Nagy (on loan from (Poland) Legia Warsaw)
26	MF	MAR	Anuar Tuhami (on loan from (Spain) Valladolid)
90	FW	ESP	Carlitos (from (United Arab Emirates) Al Wahda)

Out:

No.	Pos.	Nation	Player
5	DF	GRE	Vangelis Oikonomou (to Volos)
6	MF	ESP	Fausto Tienza (on loan to (Spain) Gimnàstic)
10	MF	FRA	Anthony Mounier (to Panetolikos)
14	MF	FRA	Yohan Mollo (on loan to (France) Orléans)
20	FW	GRE	Nikos Vergos (on loan to (Spain) Hércules)
22	MF	GRE	Theofanis Tzandaris (released)
24	DF	GRE	Fanis Mavrommatis (on loan to (Denmark) SønderjyskE)
31	FW	ALB	Kristo Shehu (on loan to (Italy) Bologna U19)
33	MF	AUS	Panos Armenakas (released)

=== Panetolikos ===
In:

No.	Pos.	Nation	Player
7	FW	BRA	Farley Rosa (from Atromitos)
15	MF	ARG	Juan Álvarez (on loan from (Argentina) Chacarita Juniors)
17	MF	FRA	Anthony Mounier (from Panathinaikos)
23	DF	ESP	Kevin García (from (Spain) Real Murcia)
25	FW	NGR	Abiola Dauda (from AEL)
27	DF	GRE	Manolis Tzanakakis (free agent)
88	GK	ESP	Jesús Fernández (on loan from (Romania) Cluj)

Out:

No.	Pos.	Nation	Player
3	DF	ARG	Luciano Balbi (released)
5	DF	CRO	Igor Jovanović (released)
7	FW	ROU	Vlad Morar (to (Romania) Voluntari)
21	DF	SEN	Pierre Sagna (to (Portugal) Santa Clara)
33	MF	ESP	Joan Román (to (Poland) Miedź Legnica)
45	DF	GRE	Gerasimos Bakadimas (on loan to Messolonghi)
93	FW	SLE	Alhassan Kamara (released)
—	MF	GRE	Stathis Belevonis (on loan to Messolonghi, previously on loan at Tilikratis)

=== AEL ===
In:

No.	Pos.	Nation	Player
4	DF	GRE	Theocharis Iliadis (from Diagoras)
9	MF	ROU	Gabriel Torje (free agent)
11	FW	GRE	Thanasis Papazoglou (from (Romania) Voluntari)
12	GK	HUN	Gergely Nagy (free agent)
13	DF	CRO	Mateo Mužek (from (Moldova) Sheriff Tiraspol)
15	DF	SRB	Svetozar Marković (on loan from Olympiacos)
21	DF	GRE	Giannis Masouras (on loan from Olympiacos, previously on loan at Panionios)
27	MF	GRE	Dimitris Loufakis (from Apollon Pontus)
66	MF	EGY	Ali Ghazal (free agent)
77	MF	BRA	Vinícius (from (Brazil) Criciúma)

Out:

No.	Pos.	Nation	Player
9	FW	NGR	Abiola Dauda (to Panetolikos)
10	MF	GRE	Evripidis Giakos (to Chania)
12	MF	GRE	Bruno Chalkiadakis (released)
17	FW	BLR	Yevgeniy Shikavka (to (Belarus) Dinamo Minsk)
28	DF	CRO	Slavko Bralić (released)
30	DF	SRB	Stefan Živković (released)
55	MF	SRB	Miloš Filipović (to (Bosnia and Herzegovina) Zrinjski Mostar)
64	MF	GRE	Fatjon Andoni (to Apollon Smyrnis)
85	MF	GRE	Alexandros Chalatsis (on loan to Almyros)
88	MF	ALB	Gertin Hoxhalli (released)
99	GK	SRB	Borivoje Ristić (to (Serbia) Radnički Niš)

=== Asteras Tripolis ===
In:

No.	Pos.	Nation	Player
77	FW	SRB	Miloš Deletić (on loan from AEK Athens)

Out:

No.	Pos.	Nation	Player

=== Xanthi ===
In:

No.	Pos.	Nation	Player
22	DF	ESP	Jorge Casado (free agent)
87	FW	ARG	Matías Castro (from (Uruguay) Montevideo Wanderers)

Out:

No.	Pos.	Nation	Player
6	MF	ESP	Pablo de Lucas (to (Romania) Voluntari)
17	FW	BRA	Lucas Poletto (on loan to Levadiakos)

=== OFI ===
In:

No.	Pos.	Nation	Player
12	MF	BRA	João Victor (from (Qatar) Umm Salal)
13	DF	GRE	Nikos Vafeas (from Apollon Smyrnis)

Out:

No.	Pos.	Nation	Player

=== Volos ===
In:

No.	Pos.	Nation	Player
4	DF	ALG	Liassine Cadamuro (free agent)
10	FW	ESP	Iker Guarrotxena (from (Poland) Pogoń Szczecin)
21	DF	GRE	Vangelis Oikonomou (from Panathinaikos)
—	MF	ESP	Nacho Cases (on loan from (Cyprus) AEK Larnaca)

Out:

No.	Pos.	Nation	Player
4	DF	CMR	Sébastien Bassong (released)
11	FW	GRE	Konstantinos Iliopoulos (to Kalamata)
14	MF	MAR	Yahia Attiyat allah (to (Morocco) Wydad)
27	FW	GRE	Giannis Mystakidis (loan return to PAOK)
45	DF	GRE	Georgios Kornezos (loan return to AEK Athens)

== Super League 2 ==
Note: Flags indicate national team as has been defined under FIFA eligibility rules. Players may hold more than one non-FIFA nationality.

=== PAS Giannina ===
In:

No.	Pos.	Nation	Player

Out:

No.	Pos.	Nation	Player
13	MF	BIH	Samir Radovac (to (Bosnia and Herzegovina) Velež Mostar)
26	MF	ARG	Pitu Garcia (retired)
—	DF	GRE	Vasilis Zogos (to (Albania) KF Bylis)
—	GK	GRE	Thodoris Venetikidis (released)

=== Levadiakos ===
In:

No.	Pos.	Nation	Player
1	GK	GRE	Giannis Angelopoulos (free agent)
7	FW	BRA	Lucas Poletto (on loan from Xanthi)
12	MF	HON	Alfredo Mejía (from (Spain) Pontevedra)

Out:

No.	Pos.	Nation	Player
6	DF	GRE	Sokratis Fytanidis (released)
7	FW	ARG	Facundo Castillón (to (Argentina) Nueva Chicago)
11	FW	ARG	Gabriel Sanabria (released)
20	MF	GRE	Petros Orfanidis (to Kavala)
40	GK	FRA	Devis Epassy (to Lamia)
66	MF	GRE	Dimitris Macheras (to Egaleo)
92	GK	GRE	Antonis Kokkalas (to Episkopi)
97	MF	ALB	Leonard Senka (to Poros)

=== Apollon Smyrnis ===
In:

No.	Pos.	Nation	Player
20	DF	GRE	Savvas Tsabouris (from (Cyprus) Nea Salamina)
27	GK	GRE	Charalampos Tsoulfas (free agent)
64	MF	GRE	Fatjon Andoni (from AEL)
77	MF	ARG	Israel Coll (from Panachaiki)
99	FW	GRE	Nikos Ioannidis (from Doxa Drama)
—	FW	GRE	Antonis Gaitanidis (on loan from PAOK)

Out:

No.	Pos.	Nation	Player
5	DF	GRE	Nikos Vafeas (to OFI)
7	MF	GRE	Charalampos Pavlidis (to Veria)
17	MF	GRE	Manolis Kragiopoulos (on loan to Platanias)
20	FW	GRE	Theodoros Chiritrantas (to Ialysos)

=== Platanias ===
In:

No.	Pos.	Nation	Player
6	DF	CUW	Doriano Kortstam (free agent)
64	GK	GRE	Vasilis Soulis (from Panachaiki)
—	DF	GRE	Thomas Garas (from Asteras Itea)
—	MF	GRE	Angelos Oikonomou (from Doxa Drama)
—	MF	GRE	Christos Giousis (on loan from AEK Athens)
—	MF	GRE	Manolis Kragiopoulos (on loan from Apollon Smyrnis)
—	MF	GRE	Paris Babis (on loan from AEK Athens, previously on loan at Kalamata)

Out:

No.	Pos.	Nation	Player
1	GK	GRE	Giannis Mantzaris (to Kalamata)
6	MF	BIH	Danijel Majkić (released)
8	MF	BRA	Tárik (to (Brazil) Ypiranga)
9	FW	BRA	Miguel Bianconi (to Lamia)
10	MF	ESP	Nili (to (India) Bengaluru)
25	GK	BRA	Gottfried Golz (released)

=== Apollon Larissa ===
In:

No.	Pos.	Nation	Player

Out:

No.	Pos.	Nation	Player
20	FW	GRE	Michalis Zannakis (to Episkopi)
33	FW	GRE	Apostolos Garyfallopoulos (to Sellana)

=== Ergotelis ===
In:

No.	Pos.	Nation	Player
8	FW	EGY	Ramez Medhat (on loan from (Egypt) Wadi Degla)
—	FW	EGY	Ahmet Atef (on loan from (Egypt) Wadi Degla)
—	DF	GRE	Kyriakos Mazoulouxis (free agent)

Out:

No.	Pos.	Nation	Player
4	DF	GRE	Konstantinos Oikonomou (released)
8	MF	GRE	Dimitris Grontis (to (Cyprus) ASIL Lysi)
15	DF	GRE	Dimitris Voutsas (on loan to Triglia)

=== Panachaiki ===
In:

No.	Pos.	Nation	Player
2	DF	GRE	Vasilios Vasilopoulos (from Preveza)
9	FW	CYP	Nestoras Mitidis (free agent)
10	MF	GRE	Dimitris Anakoglou (from Lamia)
20	MF	CYP	Dimitris Froxylias (from (England) Haringey Borough)
21	DF	GRE	Pantelis Theologou (from Apollon Pontus)
23	MF	GRE	Dimos Kokas (from Nafpaktiakos Asteras)
27	MF	GRE	Konstantinos Papadopoulos (from Diagoras Vrachnaiika)
41	DF	GRE	Dimitris Kalabokas (from Nafpaktiakos Asteras)
71	FW	GRE	Christos Tsotras (from Nafpaktiakos Asteras)

Out:

No.	Pos.	Nation	Player
1	GK	GRE	Vasilis Soulis (to Platanias)
2	DF	GRE	Ilias Polimos (free agent)
4	DF	GRE	Kostas Rougalas (to (Romania) Dunărea Călărași)
10	MF	ARG	Israel Coll (to Apollon Smyrnis)
24	MF	GRE	Panagiotis Linardos (to (Singapore) Geylang International)
45	FW	GRE	Panagiotis Moraitis (to (Montenegro) Budućnost Podgorica)

=== Chania ===
In:

No.	Pos.	Nation	Player
1	MF	GRE	Evripidis Giakos (from AEL)
8	MF	MLI	Ousmane Sountoura (from (Portugal) Casa Pia)
20	FW	GRE	Thomas Vasiliou (from Aspropyrgos)
95	MF	BRA	Carlito (from Panakrotiriakos)

Out:

No.	Pos.	Nation	Player
8	MF	ALB	Kevi Hysi (to O.F. Ierapetra)
21	FW	GRE	Thomas Nazlidis (to Triglia)
70	MF	ESP	Mario Martínez (released)
77	MF	BRA	Leozinho (released)

=== Apollon Pontus ===
In:

No.	Pos.	Nation	Player
—	GK	GRE	Athanasios Batalamas (from (Italy) Ardor Lazzate)
—	GK	GRE	Georgios Malesios (from Dias Diou)
—	DF	GRE	Marios Chatzikonstantinou (from Makedonikos)
—	DF	CYP	Andreas Chatziathanasiou (from Niki Agkathia)
—	MF	GRE	Sokratis Aidonidis (from Doxa Kato Kamila)
—	MF	GRE	Theofanis Tsiatas (from Thesprotos)

Out:

No.	Pos.	Nation	Player
1	GK	GRE	Dimitris Politis (to Veria)
2	DF	GRE	Giannis Dalianopoulos (released)
4	FW	GRE	Alexandros Doris (to Episkopi)
7	DF	GRE	Nikolaos Georgiadis (to Veria)
8	MF	BRA	Eduardo Brito (to Triglia)
9	FW	GRE	Dimitris Hasomeris (to Rodos)
10	FW	NGR	Michael Olaitan (to Panserraikos)
11	MF	GRE	Nikos Pourtoulidis (released)
17	MF	GRE	Dimitris Loufakis (to AEL)
22	DF	GRE	Pantelis Theologou (to Panachaiki)
44	DF	GRE	Panagiotis Kontoes (to Thesprotos)
55	DF	GRE	Dimitris Samaras (to Foinikas Polichni)
77	MF	GRE	Giannis Kalaitzidis (to Triglia)
—	FW	GRE	Thomas Karagiannis (to Thesprotos)

=== Doxa Drama ===
In:

No.	Pos.	Nation	Player
99	FW	GRE	Giorgos Litskas (from Nestos Chrysoupoli)

Out:

No.	Pos.	Nation	Player
5	MF	GRE	Efthymios Argyropoulos (released)
6	MF	GRE	Angelos Oikonomou (to Platanias)
10	FW	GRE	Nikolaos Ioannidis (to Apollon Smyrnis)
30	DF	GRE	Vangelis Avlonitis (to Ethnikos Piraeus)

=== Kerkyra ===
In:

No.	Pos.	Nation	Player
—	MF	GRE	Stratos Lampoglou (from Kilkisiakos)
—	DF	GRE	Alexandros Spintzos (from Aittitos Spata)
—	FW	AUS	Andrew Mesourouni (from Lamia U19)
—	DF	GRE	Lefteris Tsatalpasidis (from Kalamata)
—	FW	GRE	Christos Karakostas (from Olympiacos Volos)
—	MF	GRE	Dimitrios Sarigiannis (from Acharnaikos)
—	MF	GRE	Grigoris Ziogas (from Panserraikos)

Out:

No.	Pos.	Nation	Player
2	DF	GRE	Manolis Genitsaridis (to Almyros Gaziou)
6	MF	GRE	Nikos Kritikos (to Ionikos)
8	MF	GRE	Marios Pavlis (to Ethnikos Piraeus)
14	MF	GRE	Alexandros Piastopoulos (to Trikala)
20	MF	GRE	Stathis Vasiloudis (from Olympiacos Volos)
44	DF	GRE	Thomas Tsimpoukas (to Niki Volos)

=== Karaiskakis ===
In:

No.	Pos.	Nation	Player
6	MF	GRE	Konstantinos Chatzidimpas (from Ialysos)
—	FW	GRE	Thanasis Dinopapas (from Olympiacos Volos)

Out:

No.	Pos.	Nation	Player

== See also ==
- 2019–20 Super League 1
- 2019–20 Super League 2
