= 2017–18 PAS Giannina F.C. season =

PAS Giannina
2017–18 season
- Chairman: Giorgos Christovasilis
- Manager: Giannis Petrakis
- Stadium: Zosimades Stadium, Ioannina
- Super League: 9th
- Greek Cup: Quarter-finals, eliminated by AEL
- Top goalscorer: League: Pedro Pérez Conde (14); All: Pedro Pérez Conde (20)
- Highest home attendance: 4052; AEK Athens
- Lowest home attendance: 1772; Xanthi
- Average home league attendance: 2306
Home colours	Away colours	Third colours

The 2017–18 season is PAS Giannina F.C.'s 23rd competitive season in the top flight of Greek football, 8th season in the Super League Greece, and 52nd year in existence as a football club. They also compete in the Greek Cup.

== Players ==
Updated:12 February 2018

No.	Name	Nationality	Position(s)	Place of birth	Date of birth (Age)	Signed from	Notes
Goalkeepers
12	Kostas Peristeridis	(Greece)	GK	Chania, Crete, Greece	24 January 1991 (26)	(Greece) Platanias	
16	Thodoris Venetikidis	(Greece)	GK	Veria, Greece	20 February 2001 (16)	(Greece) Veria	
39	Markos Vellidis	(Greece)	GK	Kastoria, Greece	4 April 1987 (30)	Free	
40	Makis Giannikoglou	(Greece)	GK	Kavala, Greece	25 March 1993 (24)	(Greece) Iraklis	
Defenders
2	Michalis Boukouvalas	(Greece)	RB	Agrinio, Greece	14 January 1988 (29)	(Greece) Iraklis	
4	Thodoris Berios	(Greece)	CB	Athens, Greece	21 March 1989 (28)	(Czech Republic) Čáslav	
5	Giorgos Gogos	(Greece)	CB	Ioannina, Greece	11 July 2001 (16)	(Greece) PAS Giannina U20	
6	Alexios Michail (C)	(Greece)	CB	Ioannina, Greece	18 August 1986 (31)	(Greece) Panserraikos	
8	Themistoklis Tzimopoulos (VC2)	(New Zealand) (Greece)	CB	Kozani, Greece	20 November 1985 (30)	(Greece) Ethnikos Asteras	
11	Mite Cikarski	(North Macedonia)	LB	Strumica, North Macedonia	6 January 1993 (25)	(Cyprus) Ethnikos Achna	
20	Nikos Karanikas	(Greece)	RB	Larissa, Greece	4 March 1992 (25)	(Greece) AEL	
26	Vasilis Zogos	(Greece)	CB	Athens, Greece	29 July 1999 (18)	(Greece) Ifaistos Peristeriou	
44	Apostolos Skondras	(Greece)	CB	Athens, Greece	29 December 1988 (28)	(Greece) AEL	
77	Alexis Apostolopoulos	(Greece)	RB	Zakynthos, Greece	7 November 1991 (25)	(Greece) Platanias	
Midfielders
3	Andi Lila (VC2)	(Albania)	DM	Kavajë, Albania	12 February 1986 (31)	(Albania) KF Tirana	
7	Evripidis Giakos	(Greece)	CM / CF	Ioannina, Greece	9 April 1991 (26)	(Greece) Doxa Kranoula	
21	Iraklis Garoufalias	(Greece)	DM / CM	Athens, Greece	1 May 1993 (24)	(Greece) Fostiras	
22	Konstantinos Papadopoulos	(Greece)	CM	Ioannina, Greece	8 August 2000 (17)	(Greece) PAS Giannina U20	
23	Lampros Zacharos	(Greece)	CM	Athens, Greece	6 June 1998 (19)	(Greece) Acharnaikos	
27	Giorgos Manthatis	(Greece)	RW	Sofia, Bulgaria	11 May 1997 (20)	(Greece) Olympiacos	Loan
80	Angelos Liasos	(Greece)	CM	Florina, Greece	26 May 2000 (17)	(Greece) PAS Giannina U20	
88	Alexandros Nikolias	(Greece)	CM / RLW	Kymi, Euboea, Greece	23 July 1994 (23)	(Greece) Olympiacos Volos	
Forwards
9	Pedro Pérez Conde	(Spain)	CF	Villafranca de Córdoba, Andalusia, Spain	26 July 1988 (29)	(Spain) (Extremadura) Mérida AD	
10	Bruno Chalkiadakis	(Greece) (Brazil)	CF	Viçosa do Ceará, Brazil	7 April 1993 (24)	(Brazil) Cascavel	
14	Philip Hellquist	(Sweden)	CF	Stockholm, Sweden	21 May 1991 (26)	(Sweden) Kalmar FF	
17	Karim Soltani	(Algeria) (France)	W / CF	Brest, Brittany, France	29 August 1984 (33)	(Greece) Xanthi F.C.	
33	Higor Vidal	(Brazil)	CF / RW / CM	Campo Largo, Paraná, Brazil	26 September 1996 (20)	(Brazil) Londrina Esporte Clube	
55	Enes Dolovac	(Serbia)	CF / RLW	Novi Pazar, Serbia	1 February 1999 (18)	(Serbia) Novi Pazar Academy	
64	Franck Betra	(France) (Ivory Coast)	CF / RLW	Paris, France	18 December 1996 (20)	(England) Sheffield Wednesday F.C.	
Left during Winter Transfer window
11	David López Nadales	(Spain)	LB	Zaragoza, Aragon, Spain	22 January 1986 (31)	(Romania) Săgeata Năvodari	
42	Konstantinos Mavropanos	(Greece)	CB	Athens, Greece	11 December 1997 (19)	(Greece) Apollon Smyrnis Academy	
22	Chrysovalantis Kozoronis	(Greece)	CM	Heraklion, Crete, Greece	3 August 1992 (25)	(Greece) Ergotelis	
14	Jonathan Rodríguez	(Argentina)	CF	Marcos Juárez, Argentina	30 March 1994 (23)	(Argentina) Chacarita Juniors	
	Edelino Ié	(Guinea-Bissau) (Portugal)	CM	Bissau, Guinea-Bissau	1 May 1994 (23)	(Portugal) Braga B	Canceled

=== International players ===
- (Albania) Andi Lila
- (Greece) Michalis Boukouvalas
- (Greece) Markos Vellidis
- (Greece) Kostas Peristeridis (Men's & U-19)
- (North Macedonia) Mite Cikarski
- (Sweden) Philip Hellquist (U21 & U19 & U17)
- (Greece) Konstantinos Mavropanos (U21)
- (Greece) Alexis Apostolopoulos (U21 & U19)
- (Greece) Giorgos Manthatis (U21 & U19 & U17)
- (Greece) Lampros Zacharos (U19)
- (Greece) Bruno Chalkiadakis (U19)
- (Greece) Serafeim Giannikoglou (U17)
- (Greece) Giorgos Gogos (U17)
- (New Zealand) Themistoklis Tzimopoulos
- (Serbia) Enes Dolovac (U17)

=== Foreign players ===
EU Nationals
- (Spain) (Europe) David López Nadales
- (Spain) (Europe) Pedro Pérez Conde
- (France) (Europe) Franck Betra
- (Sweden) (Europe) Philip Hellquist

EU Nationals (Dual Citizenship)
- (New Zealand) (Greece) (Europe) Themistoklis Tzimopoulos
- (Brazil) (Greece) (Europe) Bruno Chalkiadakis
- (Algeria) (France) (Europe) Karim Soltani
- (Ivory Coast) (France) (Europe) Franck Betra
- (Guinea-Bissau) (Portugal) (Europe) Edelino Ié

Non-EU Nationals
- (Albania) Andi Lila
- (Serbia) Enes Dolovac
- (Brazil) Higor Vidal
- (Argentina) Jonathan Rodríguez
- (North Macedonia) Mite Cikarski

== Personnel ==
=== Management ===
Position	Staff
Majority Owner	Giorgos Christovasilis
President and CEO	Giorgos Christovasilis
Director of Football	Dimitris Niarchakos
Director of Office	Alekos Potsis
Head of Ticket Department	Andreas Potsis

=== Coaching staff ===
Position	Name
Head coach	Giannis Petrakis
Assistant coach	Giannis Taousianis
Fitness coach	Vasilis Alexiou
Goalkeepers Coach	Christos Tseliopoulos
Analyst	Nikolaos Gortzis

=== medical staff ===
Position	Name
Head doctor	Stavros Restanis
Physio	Filippos Skordos

=== Academy ===
Position	Name
Head of Youth Development	Dimitrios Terezopoulos
Head coach U-20	Christos Agelis
Head coach U-17	Nikos Badimas
Head coach U-15	Anastasios Anthimiadis

== Transfers ==
=== Summer ===
==== Ιn ====
No	Pos	Player	Transferred from	Fee	Date	Source
39	GK	Markos Vellidis	Free	-	28 June 2017	
10	FW	Bruno Chalkiadakis	Cascavel	-	13 July 2017	
77	DF	Alexis Apostolopoulos	Platanias	-	24 July 2017	
23	MF	Lampros Zacharos	Acharnaikos	-	24 July 2017	
64	FW	Franck Betra	Sheffield Wednesday F.C.	-	1 August 2017	
14	FW	Jonathan Rodríguez	Chacarita Juniors	-	4 August 2017	
16	GK	Thodoris Venetikidis	Veria	-	4 August 2017	
40	GK	Serafeim Giannikoglou	Iraklis	-	10 August 2017	
26	DF	Vasilis Zogos	Ifaistos Peristeriou	-	-	
17	W	Karim Soltani	Xanthi F.C.	-	30 August 2017	
27	W	Giorgos Manthatis	Olympiacos	-	31 August 2017	

==== Out ====
No	Pos	Player	Transferred to	Fee	Date	Source
23	DF	Leonardo Koutris	Olympiakos	€600,000	28 April 2017	
10	FW	Jairo	PAOK–FC Sheriff	End of loan	1 July 2017	
33	MF	Nikos Korovesis	PAOK–Platanias	End of loan	1 July 2017	
11	MF	Noé Acosta	Lamia	End of contract	1 July 2017	
98	MF	Alexandros Masouras	An. Karditsas	Free	30 June 2017	
13	GK	Nikos Koliofoukas	Kilkisiakos	Free	30 June 2017	
1	GK	Alexandros Paschalakis	PAOK	Free	1 August 2017	
93	CF	Christopher Maboulou	Free	Free	-	

For recent transfers, see List of Greek football transfers summer 2017

=== Winter ===
==== In ====
No	Pos	Player	Transferred from	Fee	Date	Source
15	CM	Edelino Ié	Braga B	Free	16 January 2018	
11	LB	Mite Cikarski	Ethnikos Achna	Free	22 January 2018	
22	CM	Konstantinos Papadopoulos	(Greece) PAS Giannina U-20	-	20 January 2018	
80	CM	Angelos Liasos	(Greece) PAS Giannina U-20	-	27 January 2018	
5	CB	Giorgos Gogos	(Greece) PAS Giannina U-20	-	3 February 2018	
14	CF	Philip Hellquist	(Sweden) Kalmar FF	-	9 February 2018	

==== Out ====
No	Pos	Player	Transferred to	Fee	Date	Source
14	FW	Jonathan Rodríguez	Released free	-	19 December 2017	
22	CM	Chrysovalantis Kozoronis	Released free	-	19 December 2017	
11	LB	David López Nadales	Released free	-	4 January 2018	
42	CB	Konstantinos Mavropanos	Arsenal	€2,150,000	4 January 2018	
	CM	Edelino Ié	Free	(Canceled)	28 January 2018	

For recent transfers, see List of Greek football transfers winter 2017–18

== Pre-season and friendlies ==
Win Draw Loss Upcoming fixture

15 July 2017 Friendly	PAS Giannina	1–0	AEL	Karpenisi
19:00	Nadales 79'	Report		Stadium: Athletic center of Karpenisi; Attendance: unknown Referee: unknown

19 July 2017 Friendly	PAS Giannina	1–1	Lamia	Karpenisi
17:15	Conde 69'	Report	Vouho 42'	Stadium: Athletic center of Karpenisi; Attendance: unknown Referee: Kourlos

2 August 2017 Friendly	AEL	2–1	PAS Giannina	Neapoli, Larissa
18:30	Giannitsanis 41' (pen.); Križman 60'	Report	Nikolias 60'	Stadium: AEL FC Arena; Attendance: unknown Referee: Alexandros Aretopoulos

8 August 2017 Friendly	PAOK	1–1	PAS Giannina	Thessaloniki
19:00	Prijović 1'	Report	Nikolias 20'	Stadium: Toumba Stadium; Attendance: unknown Referee: Stavros Mantalos

9 August 2017 Friendly	PAS Giannina	1–1	Tilikratis	Ioannina
18:30	Dolovac 53'	Report	Sideris 78'	Stadium: PEAKI; Attendance: unknown Referee: unknown

12 August 2017 Friendly	Kassiopi	0–1	PAS Giannina	Corfu (city)
18:00		Report	Chalkiadakis 37'	Stadium: Kerkyra Stadium; Attendance: unknown Referee: Dimitrios Styliaras

23 March 2018 Friendly	PAS Giannina	2–2	Kassiopi	Ioannina
16:30	Karanikas 30', 53'	Report	Grassi 47'; Mitidis 50'	Stadium: Zosimades Stadium; Attendance: unknown Referee: unknown

== Competitions ==
=== League table ===
Pos	Team	Pld	W	D	L	GF	GA	GD	Pts
7	Panionios	30	10	10	10	32	31	+1	40
8	Panetolikos	30	9	8	13	31	40	−9	35
9	PAS Giannina	30	7	13	10	31	34	−3	34 (Note: Head-to-head points: Levadiakos 2, PAS Giannina 2.)
10	Levadiakos	30	8	10	12	23	34	−11	34
11	Panathinaikos	30	10	10	10	30	30	0	32 (Note: Panathinaikos were deducted 2 points due to crowd behavior against PAOK in a play-off match during the 2016–17 season. Panathinaikos were deducted 3 points for financial reasons on 11 April 2018. On 23 April 2018 another 3 points were deducted for the same occasion.)

Source: Super League Greece
Rules for classification: 1) Points; 2) Head-to-head points; 3) Head-to-head goal difference; 4) Goals scored; 5) Goals against; 6) Play-offs (neutral ground); 7) Draw.
(Note: Criteria 6 is only used if needed to decide champion, teams for relegation or teams for UEFA competitions).

==== Results summary ====
Overall								Home						Away					
Pld	W	D	L	GF	GA	GD	Pts	W	D	L	GF	GA	GD	W	D	L	GF	GA	GD
30	7	13	10	31	34	−3	34	4	9	2	17	13	+4	3	4	8	14	21	−7

==== Fixtures ====
Win Draw Loss

19 August 2017 1	Asteras Tripolis	1-2	PAS Giannina	Tripoli
19:15	Kaltsas 49'; Kaltsas (yellow card) 83'	Report	Nadales 6'; Mavropanos 19'; Garoufalias (yellow card) 34'; Lila (yellow card) 85'; Nadales (yellow card) 86'	Stadium: Theodoros Kolokotronis Stadium; Attendance: 1547; Referee: Anastasios Sidiropoulos

27 August 2017 2	PAS Giannina	0-0	AEK Athens	Ioannina
21:30	Boukouvalas (yellow card) 51'; Higor Vidal (yellow card) 79'; Lila (yellow card) 83'	Report	Vranješ (yellow card) 49'; Ćosić (yellow card) 56'; Mantalos (yellow card) 80'	Stadium: Zosimades Stadium; Attendance: 4052; Referee: Alexandros Aretopoulos

9 September 2017 3	Atromitos	0-0	PAS Giannina	Athens
18:15	Madson (yellow card) 67'; Giannoulis (yellow card) 90+1'	Report	Mavropanos (yellow card) 74'; Tzimopoulos (yellow card) 80'; Skondras (yellow card) 82'	Stadium: Peristeri Stadium; Attendance: 790; Referee: Athanasios Sezos

18 September 2017 4	PAS Giannina	1-1	Panionios	Ioannina
19:00	Tzimopoulos (yellow card) 54'; Chalkiadakis 57'; Lila (yellow card) 58'; Garoufalias (yellow card) 68'; Mavropanos (yellow card) 90'	Report	Masouras 49'; Korbos (yellow card) 54'; Shojaei (yellow card) 81' (yellow-red card) 87'	Stadium: Zosimades Stadium; Attendance: 2377; Referee: Giorgos Kominis

24 September 2017 5	PAOK	1-0	PAS Giannina	Thessaloniki
16:00	Prijović 55'	Report	Mavropanos (yellow card) 24'; Karanikas (yellow card) 50'; Soltani (yellow card) 71'; Chalkiadakis (yellow card) 84'	Stadium: Toumba Stadium; Attendance: C. doors Referee: Angelos Evangelou

30 September 2017 6	Panathinaikos	2-0	PAS Giannina	Athens
18:15	Michail 11' (o.g.); Molins 13'; Kourbelis (yellow card) 52'; Sylla (yellow card) 72'; Molins (yellow card) 83'	Report	Mavropanos (yellow card) 12'; Garoufalias (yellow card) 40'; Soltani (yellow card) 90'	Stadium: Leoforos Stadium; Attendance: 10620; Referee: Emmanouil Skoulas

14 October 2017 7	PAS Giannina	3-1	Platanias	Ioannina
16:00	Conde 12'; Tzimopoulos 36'; Chalkiadakis 39'; Chalkiadakis (yellow card) 81'; Tzimopoulos (yellow card) 89'	Report	Grzelczak 7'; Stanisavljević (yellow card) 49'; Stathis (yellow card) 51'; Dikamona (yellow card) 85' (yellow-red card) 86'	Stadium: Zosimades Stadium; Attendance: 1841; Referee: Praxitelis Zachariadis

21 October 2017 8	Levadiakos	1-1	PAS Giannina	Livadeia
16:00	Leonardo (yellow card) 15'; Mendy (yellow card) 55'; P. Giakoumakis 63'; Niasse (yellow card) 90+2'	Report	Conde 45+1'; Boukouvalas (yellow card) 53'	Stadium: Levadia Municipal Stadium; Attendance: 1112; Referee: Alexandros Tsamouris

28 October 2017 9	PAS Giannina	2-1	Kassiopi	Ioannina
17:15	Conde 76'; Giakos 82'	Report	Balafas (yellow card) 27'; Epstein (yellow card) 45'; Pamlidis 72'	Stadium: Zosimades Stadium; Attendance: 1961

5 November 2017 10	Apollon Smyrnis	4-3	PAS Giannina	Rizoupoli, Athens
17:15	Bartolini 26'; Tzimopoulos 38' (o.g.); Koné (yellow card) 68'; Dasios (yellow card) 72'; Añete 74' (pen.); Añete (yellow card) 81'; Almpanis 86'	Report	Mavropanos 32'; Conde 35', 90+5'; Mavropanos (yellow card) 74'; Soltani (yellow card) 78'; Lila (yellow card) 81'	Stadium: Georgios Kamaras Stadium; Attendance: 819; Referee: Athanasios Tzilos

19 November 2017 11	PAS Giannina	1-1	Panetolikos	Ioannina
17:15	Soltani 22'; Conde (yellow card) 88'	Report	Marinakis (yellow card) 43'; Mygas (yellow card) 68'; Morar 69'; Díaz Gutiérrez (yellow card) 82'; Mazurek (yellow card) 86'; Bejarano (yellow card) 88'; Mihaj (yellow card) 90'; Cennamo (yellow card) 90+2'	Stadium: Zosimades Stadium; Attendance: 2493; Referee: Aristidis Vatsios

25 November 2017 12	PAS Giannina	1-1	Xanthi	Ioannina
15:00	Soltani (yellow card) 21'; Conde 49'; Garoufalias (yellow card) 83'	Report	Jendrišek 87'	Stadium: Zosimades Stadium; Attendance: 1772; Referee: Dimitrios Karantonis

3 December 2017 13	AEL	1-1	PAS Giannina	Larissa
17:15	Nazlidis 5' (pen.); Andoni (yellow card) 43'; Wallace (yellow card) 71'; Žižić (yellow card) 79'	Report	Conde 55'; Mavropanos (yellow card) 58'; Tzimopoulos (yellow card) 77'	Stadium: AEL FC Arena; Attendance: 3673; Referee: Praxitelis Zachariadis

10 December 2017 14	PAS Giannina	1-1	Lamia	Ioannina
17:15	Mavropanos 64'; Skondras (yellow card) 69'; Chalkiadakis (yellow card) 83'	Report	Papargyriou (yellow card) 52'; Tsoukalos 77'; Anastasopoulos (yellow card) 83'	Stadium: Zosimades Stadium; Attendance: 2058; Referee: Agelos Euagelou

17 December 2017 15	Olympiacos	1-0	PAS Giannina	Piraeus
15:00	Tachtsidis (yellow card) 11'; Cissé (yellow card) 41'; Marin 63'; Romao (yellow card) 75'	Report	Berios (yellow card) 11'; Lila (yellow card) 45'; Conde (yellow card) 64'; Boukouvalas (yellow card) 82'	Stadium: Karaiskakis Stadium; Attendance: 18235; Referee: Athanasios Tzilos

7 January 2018 16	PAS Giannina	0-0	Asteras Tripolis	Ioannina
17:15	Boukouvalas (yellow card) 27'; Karanikas (yellow card) 30'; Berios (yellow card) 90'	Report	Pasalidis (yellow card) 54'; Gondo (yellow card) 90+1'; Igor Silva (yellow card) 90+3'	Stadium: Zosimades Stadium; Attendance: 1997; Referee: Emanouil Skoulas

14 January 2018 17	AEK Athens	3-1	PAS Giannina	Athens
19:30	Livaja 12'; Araujo 53', 89'	Report	Boukouvalas (yellow card) 29'; Skondras (yellow card) 39' (yellow-red card) 61'; Garoufalias 47'	Stadium: OAKA; Attendance: 6014; Referee: Dimitris Styliaras

21 January 2018 18	PAS Giannina	2-2	Atromitos	Ioannina
17:15	Higor Vidal (yellow card) 28'; Lila (yellow card) 41'; Giakos (yellow card) 69'; Conde 87'; Betra 89'; Betra (yellow card) 90+4'; Tzimopoulos (yellow card) 90+6'	Report	Šakić (yellow card) 41'; Chatziisaias (yellow card) 56'; Dauda 71' (pen.); Karasalidis 90+1'	Stadium: Zosimades Stadium; Attendance: 1832; Referee: Aristotelis Diamantopoulos

28 January 2018 19	Panionios	0-1	PAS Giannina	Nea Smyrni
17:15	Banana Yaya (yellow card) 43'; Korbos (yellow card) 78'	Report	Karanikas (yellow card) 27'; Berios (yellow card) 50'; Chalkiadakis (yellow card) 89'; Tzimopoulos 90+1'	Stadium: Nea Smyrni Stadium; Attendance: 1412; Referee: Athanasios Sezos

4 February 2018 20	PAS Giannina	1-3	PAOK	Ioannina
15:00	Garoufalias (yellow card) 37'; Conde 71'; Cikarski (yellow card) 78'; Boukouvalas (yellow card) 81'	Report	Pelkas 9'; Crespo (yellow card) 37'; Prijović 39', 45+1'; Biseswar (yellow card) 90'; Vieirinha (yellow card) 90+1'	Stadium: Zosimades Stadium; Attendance: 3858; Referee: Aristomenis Koutsiautis

10 February 2018 21	PAS Giannina	2-1	Panathinaikos	Ioannina
19:30	Conde 30', 45+1'; Boukouvalas (yellow card) 53'; Conde (yellow card) 90+3'; Berios (yellow card) 90+4'	Report	Johansson (yellow card) 49'; Garoufalias 69' (o.g.); Kaçe (yellow card) 78'; Coulibaly (yellow card) 88'	Stadium: Zosimades Stadium; Attendance: 2374; Referee: Anastasios Sidiropoulos

18 February 2018 22	Platanias	0-3	PAS Giannina	Platanias
15:00	Stamou (yellow card) 8'; Malsa (yellow card) 13'; Petropoulos (yellow card) 84'	Report	Conde 47', 51'; Higor Vidal (yellow card) 49'; Chalkiadakis (yellow card) 54'; Apostolopoulos (yellow card) 60'; Michail (yellow card) 65'; Berios 86'	Stadium: Perivolia Municipal Stadium; Attendance: 1625; Referee: Stavros Mantalos

24 February 2018 23	PAS Giannina	0-0	Levadiakos	Ioannina
15:00	Garoufalias (yellow card) 83'; Berios (yellow card) 84'	Report	Markovski (yellow card) 37'; Obiora (yellow card) 40'; Zaradoukas (yellow card) 80'; Karachalios (yellow card) 90'; Sotiriou (yellow card) 90+4'	Stadium: Zosimades Stadium; Attendance: 1775; Referee: Stefanos Koubarakis

3 March 2018 24	Kassiopi	1-1	PAS Giannina	Kerkyra
17:15	Pamlidis 21'; Kritikos (yellow card) 59'; Leković (yellow card) 60'	Report	Skondras 34'; Apostolopoulos (yellow card) 40'; Karanikas (yellow card) 77'	Stadium: Kerkyra Stadium; Attendance: 1449; Referee: Anastasios Papapetrou

4 April 2018 25	PAS Giannina	0-1	Apollon Smyrnis	Ioannina
19:30	Higor Vidal (yellow card) 31'	Report	Kyrgias (yellow card) 29'; Nadales 32'; Elbaz (yellow card) 39'; Juárez (yellow card) 77'; Stokes (yellow card) 90'; Huanderson (yellow card) 90+5'	Stadium: Zosimades Stadium; Attendance: 1837; Referee: Ioannis Papadopoulos

31 March 2018 26	Panetolikos	1-0	PAS Giannina	Agrinio
15:00	Paulo 14'; Morar (yellow card) 17'; Itabel (yellow card) 90'	Report	Garoufalias (yellow card) 8'; Chalkiadakis (yellow card) 34'; Apostolopoulos (red card) 53'	Stadium: Panetolikos Stadium; Attendance: 2306; Referee: Athanasios Sezos

15 April 2018 27	Xanthi	3-0	PAS Giannina	Xanthi
17:15	Đuričković 50'; Đuričković (yellow card) 52'; Jendrišek 56', 72'	Report	Tzimopoulos (yellow card) 63'; Cikarski (yellow card) 70'	Stadium: Xanthi Arena; Attendance: 1153; Referee: Ioannis Neofitiadis

22 April 2018 28	PAS Giannina	0-0	AEL	Ioannina
19:00	Skondras (yellow card) 90+2'	Report	Hubchev (yellow card) 14'; Gojković (yellow card) 45+4'; Masouras (yellow card) 51'	Stadium: Zosimades Stadium; Attendance: 1773; Referee: Stavros Mantalos

29 April 2018 29	Lamia	2-1	PAS Giannina	Lamia
19:00	Omo (yellow card) 2'; Piti 45'; Omo 62'; Papadopoulos (yellow card) 90+3'	Report	Boukouvalas (yellow card) 16'; Michail (yellow card) 40'; Lila (yellow card) 70'; Chalkiadakis 76'	Stadium: Lamia Municipal Stadium; Attendance: 1477; Referee: Aristotelis Diamantopoulos

6 May 2018 30	PAS Giannina	3-0	Olympiacos	Ioannina
19:00	Apostolopoulos (yellow card) 30'; Tzimopoulos 54'; Conde 61'; Tzimopoulos (yellow card) 79'; Higor Vidal 90+2'	Report	Tachtsidis (yellow card) 64'; Igor Silva (yellow card) 79'	Stadium: Zosimades Stadium; Attendance: 2592; Referee: Stefanos Koubarakis

=== Group G ===
Pos	Team	Pld	W	D	L	GF	GA	GD	Pts	Qualification	PAS	PGSS	ARIS	PNG
1	PAS Giannina	3	1	2	0	5	2	+3	5	Round of 16		—	—	3–0
2	Panionios	3	1	1	1	3	3	0	4	Round of 16	1–1		—	—
3	Aris	3	1	1	1	3	3	0	4		1–1	1–2		—
4	Panegialios	3	1	0	2	1	4	−3	3		—	1–0	0–1	

Source: epo.gr
Rules for classification: 1) points, 2) head-to-head points, 3) head-to-head goal difference, 4) head-to-head best offense, 5) overall goal difference, 6) overall best offense, 7) overall best defense

==== Fixtures ====
21 September 2017 1	Panionios	1-1	PAS Giannina	Nea Smyrni
16:00	Spiridonović 21'; Saramantas (yellow card) 36'; Kargas (yellow card) 83'; Guihoata (yellow card) 90+2'	Report	Lila (yellow card) 21'; Giakos 84'	Stadium: Nea Smyrni Stadium; Referee: Giorgos Tzovaras

24 October 2017 2	PAS Giannina	3-0	Panegialios	Ioannina
15:00	Nikolias 33'; Skondras 50'; Conde 67'	Report	Kokkoris (yellow card) 39'	Stadium: Zosimades Stadium; Referee: Nikolaos Poulimas

28 November 2017 3	Aris Thessaloniki	1-1	PAS Giannina	Thessaloniki
19:30	Hugo Sousa (yellow card) 36'; Milunović 60'	Report	Garoufalias (yellow card) 19'; Berios (yellow card) 26'; Karanikas (red card) 36'; Tzimopoulos (yellow card) 59'; Soltani (yellow card) 70'; Soltani 72'; Apostolopoulos (yellow card) 88'; Giannikoglou (yellow card) 90+2'	Stadium: Kleanthis Vikelidis Stadium; Referee: Alexandros Aretopoulos

==== Last 16 ====
21 December 2017 1st leg	Levadiakos	1-0	PAS Giannina	Livadeia
19.30	Mitropoulos (yellow card) 49'; Nikolaos Kaltsas (yellow card) 82'; Favaro 89'; Favaro (yellow card) 89'; P. Giakoumakis (yellow card) 90+3'	Report	Tzimopoulos (yellow card) 88'; Berios (yellow card) 90+1'	Stadium: Levadia Municipal Stadium; Referee: Georgios Tzovaras

10 January 2018 2nd leg	PAS Giannina	4-0	Levadiakos	Ioannina
17.15	Tzimopoulos 30'; Conde 38', 79'; Michail (yellow card) 44'; Skondras (yellow card) 45'; Apostolopoulos (yellow card) 71'; Garoufalias 90+2'	Report	Chumbinho (yellow card) 9'; Jordão Diogo (yellow card) 27'; Leonardo (yellow card) 37'; Nikolaos Kaltsas (yellow card) 52'; Belghazouani (yellow card) 71'	Stadium: Zosimades Stadium; Referee: Stavros Mantalos

==== Quarter-finals ====
25 January 2018 1st leg	PAS Giannina	1-2	AEL	Ioannina
19.30	Conde 13'; Tzimopoulos (yellow card) 30'; Berios (yellow card) 39'; Karanikas (yellow card) 77'	Report	Masouras 28', 53'; Golias (yellow card) 38'; Božović (yellow card) 70'; Hubchev (yellow card) 89'; Wallace (yellow card) 90+1'; Masouras (yellow card) 90+4'	Stadium: Zosimades Stadium; Referee: Georgios Kominis

7 February 2018 2nd leg	AEL	3-2 OT	PAS Giannina	Larissa
17.15	Križman 11'; Milosavljević (yellow card) 21'; Lagos (yellow card) 58'; Žižić (yellow card) 81'; Andoni (yellow card) 85'; Masouras 99'; Leozinho (yellow card) 102'; Andoni 108' (pen.); Perrone (yellow card) 120'	Report	Conde 22', 82'; Garoufalias (yellow card) 37'; Cikarski (yellow card) 76'; Soltani (yellow card) 90+2'; Higor Vidal (yellow card) 97'; Conde (yellow card) 103'; Michail (yellow card) 108'	Stadium: AEL FC Arena; Referee: Dimitrios Karantonis

== Statistics ==
=== Appearances ===
No.	Pos.	Nat.	Name	Greek Super League	Greek Cup	Total
No.	Pos.	Nat.	Name	Apps	Apps	Apps
2	RB	(Greece)	Michalis Boukouvalas	25	3	28
3	DM	(Albania)	Andi Lila	21	2	23
4	CB	(Greece)	Thodoris Berios	9	6	15
5	CB	(Greece)	Giorgos Gogos	0	0	0
6	CB	(Greece)	Alexios Michail	29	3	32
7	CM / CF	(Greece)	Evripidis Giakos	28	6	34
8	CB	(New Zealand) (Greece)	Themistoklis Tzimopoulos	26	4	30
9	CF	(Spain)	Pedro Pérez Conde	26	5	31
10	CF	(Greece) (Brazil)	Bruno Chalkiadakis	25	6	31
11	LB	(North Macedonia)	Mite Cikarski	5	1	6
11	LB	(Spain)	David López Nadales	13	2	15
12	GK	(Greece)	Kostas Peristeridis	0	3	3
14	CF	(Sweden)	Philip Hellquist	7	0	7
14	CF	(Argentina)	Jonathan Rodríguez	0	0	0
16	GK	(Greece)	Thodoris Venetikidis	0	0	0
17	W / CF	(Algeria) (France)	Karim Soltani	15	5	20
20	RB	(Greece)	Nikos Karanikas	17	5	22
21	DM / CM	(Greece)	Iraklis Garoufalias	21	5	26
22	CM	(Greece)	Konstantinos Papadopoulos	0	0	0
22	CM	(Greece)	Chrysovalantis Kozoronis	8	3	11
23	CM	(Greece)	Lampros Zacharos	0	0	0
26	CB	(Greece)	Vasilis Zogos	0	0	0
27	RW	(Greece)	Giorgos Manthatis	27	7	34
33	CF / RW / CM	(Brazil)	Higor Vidal	18	6	24
39	GK	(Greece)	Markos Vellidis	26	0	26
40	GK	(Greece)	Serafeim Giannikoglou	4	4	8
42	CB	(Greece)	Konstantinos Mavropanos	14	2	16
44	CB	(Greece)	Apostolos Skondras	15	4	19
55	CF / RLW	(Serbia)	Enes Dolovac	1	2	3
64	CF / RLW	(France) (Ivory Coast)	Franck Betra	9	6	15
77	RB	(Greece)	Alexis Apostolopoulos	13	5	18
80	CM	(Greece)	Angelos Liasos	0	0	0
88	CM / RLW	(Greece)	Alexandros Nikolias	16	1	17
-	CM	(Guinea-Bissau) (Portugal)	Edelino Ié	-	-	-

Super League Greece

=== Goalscorers ===
No.	Pos.	Nat.	Name	Greek Super League	Greek Cup	Total
No.	Pos.	Nat.	Name	Goals	Goals	Goals
9	CF	(Spain)	Pedro Pérez Conde	14	6	20
8	CB	(New Zealand) (Greece)	Themistoklis Tzimopoulos	3	1	4
10	CF	(Greece) (Brazil)	Bruno Chalkiadakis	3	0	3
42	CB	(Greece)	Konstantinos Mavropanos	3	0	3
17	W / CF	(Algeria) (France)	Karim Soltani	1	1	2
7	CM / CF	(Greece)	Evripidis Giakos	1	1	2
21	DM / CM	(Greece)	Iraklis Garoufalias	1	1	2
44	CB	(Greece)	Apostolos Skondras	1	1	2
11	LB	(Spain)	David López Nadales	1	0	1
4	CB	(Greece)	Thodoris Berios	1	0	1
33	CF / RW / CM	(Brazil)	Higor Vidal	1	0	1
64	CF / RLW	(France) (Ivory Coast)	Franck Betra	1	0	1
88	CM / RLW	(Greece)	Alexandros Nikolias	0	1	1

Super League Greece

=== Clean sheets ===
No.	Pos.	Nat.	Name	Greek Super League	Greek Cup	Total
No.	Pos.	Nat.	Name	CS	CS	CS
12	GK	(Greece)	Kostas Peristeridis	0 (0)	1 (3)	1 (3)
16	GK	(Greece)	Thodoris Venetikidis	0 (0)	0 (0)	0 (0)
39	GK	(Greece)	Markos Vellidis	7 (26)	0 (0)	7 (26)
40	GK	(Greece)	Serafeim Giannikoglou	1 (4)	1 (4)	2 (8)

=== Best goal and MVP awards winners ===
MD	MVP award	Best goal award
7	-	(Greece) Bruno Chalkiadakis (PAS Giannina)
21	(Spain) Pedro Conde (PAS Giannina)	(Spain) Pedro Conde (PAS Giannina)
22	-	(Spain) Pedro Conde (PAS Giannina)
24	-	(Greece) Apostolos Skondras (PAS Giannina)
30	(Spain) Pedro Conde (PAS Giannina)	(Spain) Pedro Conde (PAS Giannina)

=== Disciplinary record ===
S	P	N	Name	Super League			Greek Cup			Total		
S	P	N	Name	Yellow card	Yellow-red card	Red card	Yellow card	Yellow-red card	Red card	Yellow card	Yellow-red card	Red card
2	RB	(Greece)	Michalis Boukouvalas	8	0	0	0	0	0	8	0	0
3	DM	(Albania)	Andi Lila	7	0	0	1	0	0	8	0	0
4	CB	(Greece)	Thodoris Berios	5	0	0	3	0	0	8	0	0
6	CB	(Greece)	Alexios Michail	2	0	0	2	0	0	4	0	0
7	CM / CF	(Greece)	Evripidis Giakos	1	0	0	0	0	0	1	0	0
8	CB	(New Zealand) (Greece)	Themistoklis Tzimopoulos	7	0	0	3	0	0	10	0	0
9	CF	(Spain)	Pedro Pérez Conde	3	0	0	1	0	0	4	0	0
10	CF	(Greece) (Brazil)	Bruno Chalkiadakis	6	0	0	0	0	0	6	0	0
11	LB	(North Macedonia)	Mite Cikarski	2	0	0	1	0	0	3	0	0
11	LB	(Spain)	David López Nadales	1	0	0	0	0	0	1	0	0
17	W / CF	(Algeria) (France)	Karim Soltani	4	0	0	2	0	0	6	0	0
20	RB	(Greece)	Nikos Karanikas	4	0	0	1	0	1	5	0	1
21	DM / CM	(Greece)	Iraklis Garoufalias	7	0	0	2	0	0	9	0	0
33	CF / RW / CM	(Brazil)	Higor Vidal	4	0	0	1	0	0	5	0	0
40	GK	(Greece)	Serafeim Giannikoglou	0	0	0	1	0	0	1	0	0
42	CB	(Greece)	Konstantinos Mavropanos	6	0	0	0	0	0	6	0	0
44	CB	(Greece)	Apostolos Skondras	3	1	0	1	0	0	4	1	0
64	CF / RLW	(France) (Ivory Coast)	Franck Betra	1	0	0	0	0	0	1	0	0
77	RB	(Greece)	Alexis Apostolopoulos	3	0	1	2	0	0	5	0	1
