= Konstantinos Mavropanos =

Greek footballer (born 1997)

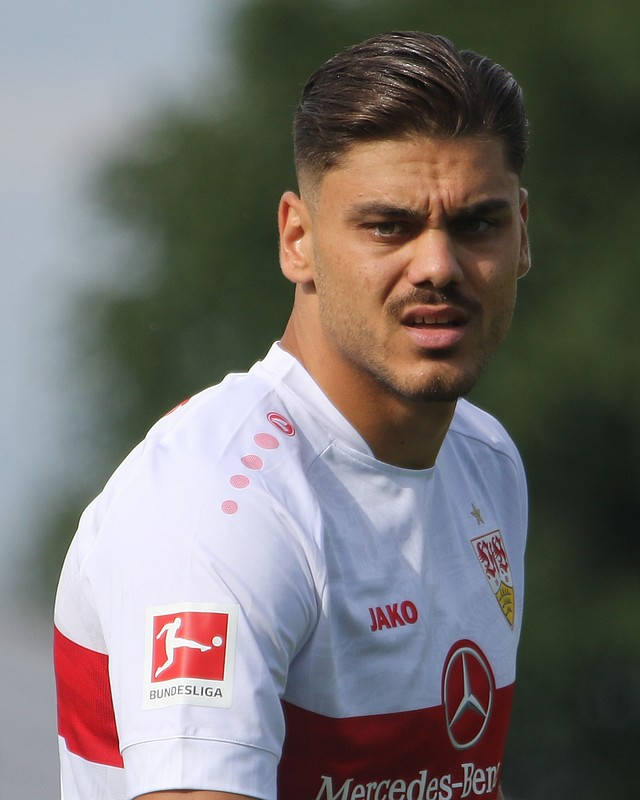
- Mavropanos with VfB Stuttgart in 2022

Personal information
- Full name: Konstantinos Mavropanos
- Date of birth: 11 December 1997 (age 28)
- Place of birth: Athens, Greece
- Height: 1.94 m (6 ft 4 in)
- Position: Centre-back

Team information
- Current team: West Ham United
- Number: 15

Youth career
- 2008–2016: Apollon Smyrnis

Senior career*
Years	Team	Apps	(Gls)
2016–2018	PAS Giannina	16	(3)
2018–2022	Arsenal	7	(0)
2020	→ Nürnberg (loan)	11	(0)
2020–2022	→ VfB Stuttgart (loan)	52	(4)
2022–2023	VfB Stuttgart	28	(2)
2023–	West Ham United	97	(10)

International career^{‡}
2017–2018	Greece U21	4	(0)
2021–	Greece	46	(2)
- * Club domestic league appearances and goals as of 16:55, 21 November 2026 (UTC) ‡ National team caps and goals as of 23:45, 4 October 2026 (UTC)

Konstantinos "Dinos" Mavropanos (Greek: Κωνσταντίνος Μαυροπάνος; born 11 December 1997) is a Greek professional footballer who plays as a centre-back for EFL Championship club West Ham United and the Greece national team.

== Club career ==
=== PAS Giannina ===
Born in Athens, Mavropanos began his career with the youth side at Apollon Smyrnis, where he stayed for eight years. When he was released from Apollon, he joined Super League side PAS Giannina in January 2016, signing a three-and-a-half-year contract. The transfer was completed after actions of PAS former owner Giorgos Christovasilis. Both of them hail from the village Agnanta Artas. Mavropanos made his competitive debut for PAS Giannina in the Greek Cup on 29 November 2016. He started and played the full match as they won 1–0.

Mavropanos made his league debut for PAS Giannina on 5 April 2017 against Veria. He started and played 57 minutes as PAS Giannina lost 3–0. He scored his first goal for the club on 19 August 2017 during the first league match of the season against Asteras Tripolis. His 19th-minute goal would be the winner in a 2–1 victory. Mavropanos was then voted man of the match in PAS Giannina's draw against ΑΕΚ Athens a week later on 27 August.

Mavropanos made 23 appearances in all competitions for PAS Giannina, scoring three goals.

=== Arsenal ===
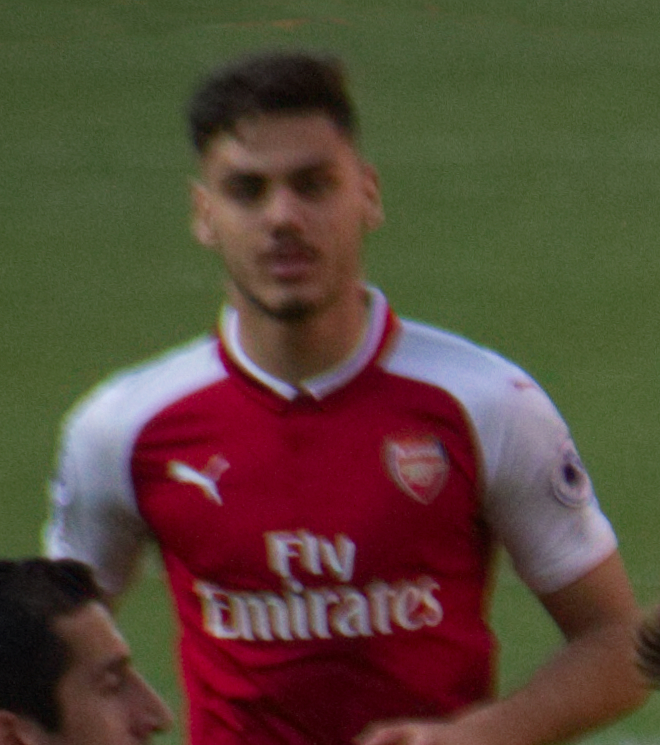
Mavropanos with Arsenal in 2018

On 4 January 2018, Mavropanos signed for Premier League side Arsenal for a reported fee of €2.1 million. On 15 January, Mavropanos helped the Arsenal U-23 team beat Manchester United's reserves 4–0 at home, playing the entire 90 minutes. On 2 February, Mavropanos was added to the Europa League squad for the knockout phase.

On 29 April, Mavropanos made his Premier League debut in a 2–1 defeat against Manchester United at Old Trafford. His performance was praised by both fans and pundits. He made his home debut in the club's next match against Burnley. That match was also the final home game under manager Arsène Wenger, with Mavropanos keeping his first clean sheet as the team won 5–0. He also played in the following game away against Leicester City, but was sent off after 15 minutes to conclude his first season at Arsenal.

At the beginning of October 2018, Mavropanos suffered a groin injury and was ruled out until mid-December. On 15 January 2019, he returned to competitive action after nearly four months, playing 70 minutes of the U-23s' 5–1 win over Manchester City. On 3 February 2019, he made his 2018–19 season debut as a substitute for Shkodran Mustafi in a 3–1 away loss against champions Manchester City.

On 12 May 2019, on the last matchday of the season, Mavropanos was partnered with Shkodran Mustafi as centre-back, but was replaced by Laurent Koscielny after half an hour due to injury in a 3–1 away win against Burnley.

==== Loan to 1. FC Nürnberg ====
On 13 January 2020, after struggling for match time at Arsenal, Mavropanos moved to 2. Bundesliga club 1. FC Nürnberg on loan for the remainder of the 2019–20 season, and the Greek international picked up momentum in the heart of the Nuremberg defence with three stellar performances in a row. He won consecutive Man of the Match awards in his second and third game for the club, before making a key goalline clearance in his fourth. On 25 February 2020, Mavropanos picked up an injury playing against Darmstadt 98; the club was unsure of how long he would be absent.

=== Loan and permanent move to VfB Stuttgart ===
On 16 July 2020, Mavropanos signed a new deal with Arsenal and joined VfB Stuttgart on a €250,000 loan for the 2020–21 season. At Stuttgart he was reunited with Sven Mislintat who had originally scouted and signed the player for Arsenal. On 3 October 2020, Mavropanos made his competitive debut for Stuttgart in the Bundesliga against Bayer Leverkusen; the game ended in a 1–1 draw. On 15 October 2020, Mavropanos suffered an injury during a friendly with SC Freiburg and underwent an operation on his meniscus.

On 24 June 2021, his loan deal was extended for a second season, with an option to make the loan permanent with a purchase option of €3.5 million at the end of the season. On 7 August 2021, a week before hosting Greuther Fürth for the Bundesliga premiere, Mavropanos scored a header from a corner kick against BFC Dynamo as he started the first round of the DFB-Pokal.

On 28 August 2021, Mavropanos scored his first Bundesliga goal as he battled his way through three defenders before exchanging passes with Hamadi Al Ghaddioui and sent a fine finish into the top corner in a home Bundesliga game against SC Freiburg. On 2 October 2021, with an hour played, Mavropanos collected the ball on the right, burst through the Hoffenheim defence, and unleashed a fierce left-footed drive to double Stuttgart's advantage in a 3–1 home Bundesliga win.

On 16 October 2021, the Greek central defender opened the scoring in the 15th minute with a shot from 30 meters and against the flow of the match, eventually sealing a 1–1 away draw against Borussia Mönchengladbach. On 11 December 2021, he opened the score with a tremendous kick in a vital away 2–0 win against VfL Wolfsburg in the club effort to avoid relegation. This was the fourth goal of the season for the defender.

After the German club avoided relegation in May 2022, a purchase option for Mavropanos with a contract until June 2025 at Stuttgart was triggered.

=== West Ham United ===
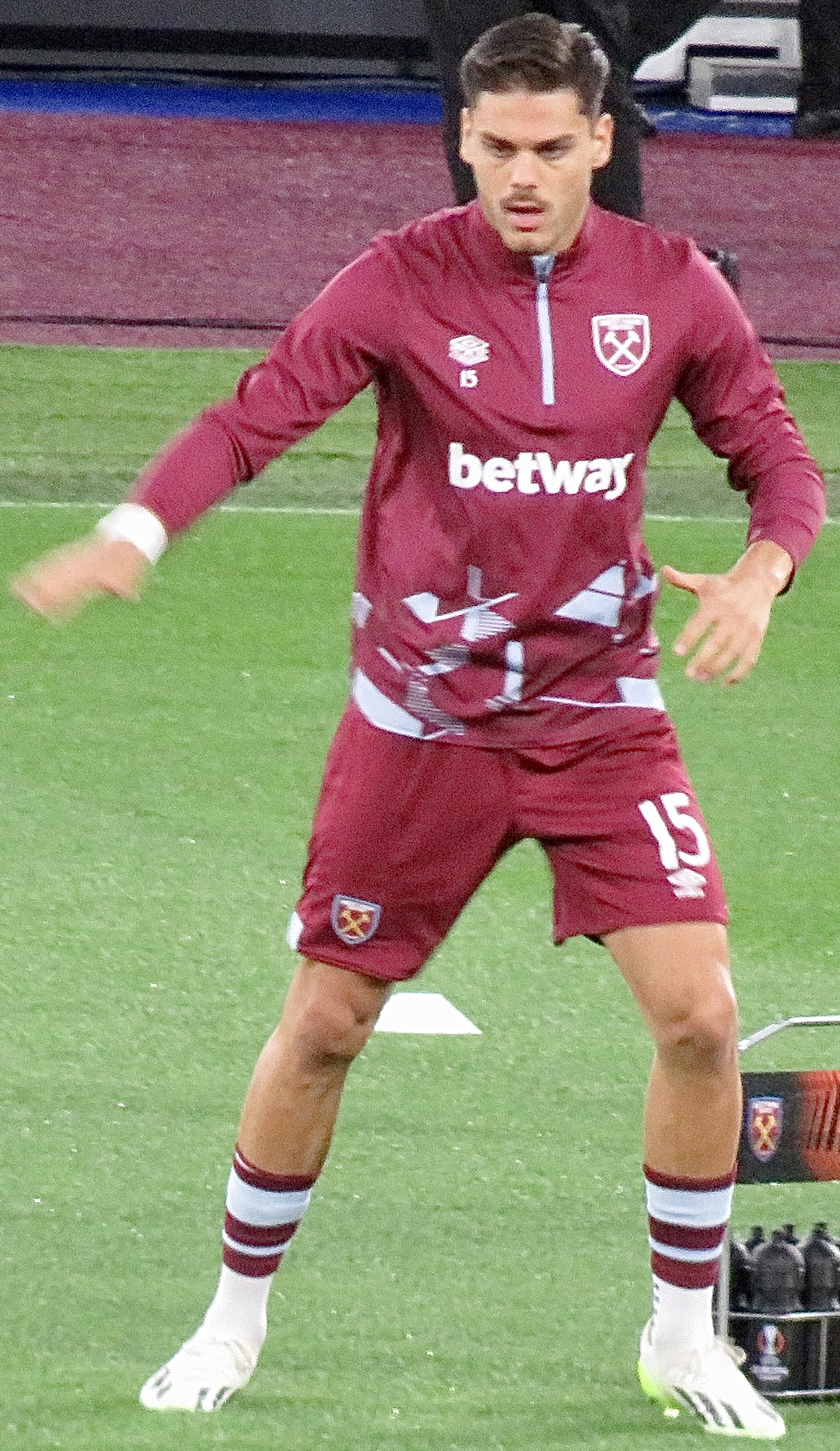
Mavropanos in Europa League match against TSC Bačka Topola

On 22 August 2023, it was announced that Mavropanos had signed for English club West Ham United on a five-year contract for a €25 million fee. 10% of the transfer fee was payable to Arsenal as they had inserted a sell-on clause in the player's contract when he was sold in 2022.

He is the first Greek player to play for West Ham. He made his debut for the club on 21 September in 3–1 Europa League win over TSC Bačka Topola. On 28 December, he scored his first goal for West Ham in a 2–0 away win against his former club Arsenal.

Mavropanos scored the winning penalty kick to take West Ham to the FA Cup quarter-finals against Brentford on 9 March 2026. Later that week, on 14 March, he scored his second Premier League goal, leading to a 1–1 draw against Manchester City. The goal was later given the West Ham goal of the month award for March.

On 10 April, Mavropanos scored his third and fourth Premier League goals, in West Ham's 4–0 win over Wolverhampton Wanderers. Following his performances for the club in the 2025–26 season, Mavropanos was voted as Hammer of the Year by the club's supporters.

Mavropanos was named the EFL Championship Player of the Month for September 2026, after scoring four goals in five games throughout the month.

== International career ==
On 24 March 2021, Mavropanos was called up to the Greek senior team by coach John van 't Schip for the forthcoming World Cup 2022 qualifiers against Spain and Georgia. On 28 March 2021, he made his debut with the national team as a substitute in a friendly against Honduras.

On 10 September 2023, Mavropanos scored a brace in a UEFA Euro 2024 qualifying 5–0 win against Gibraltar, his first goals for the national team.

== Career statistics ==
=== Club ===
As of match played 21 November 2026

Appearances and goals by club, season and competition
Club	Season	League			National cup (Note: Includes Greek Cup, DFB-Pokal, FA Cup)		League cup (Note: Includes EFL Cup)		Europe		Other		Total	
Club	Season	Division	Apps	Goals	Apps	Goals	Apps	Goals	Apps	Goals	Apps	Goals	Apps	Goals
PAS Giannina	2016–17	Super League Greece	2	0	2	0	—		0	0	—		4	0
PAS Giannina	2017–18	Super League Greec	14	3	2	0	—		—		—		16	3
PAS Giannina	Total		16	3	4	0	—		0	0	—		20	3
Arsenal	2017–18	Premier League	3	0	0	0	0	0	0	0	—		3	0
Arsenal	2018–19	Premier League	4	0	0	0	0	0	0	0	—		4	0
Arsenal	2019–20	Premier League	0	0	0	0	0	0	1 (Note: Appearance(s) in UEFA Europa League)	0	—		1	0
Arsenal	Total		7	0	0	0	0	0	1	0	—		8	0
1. FC Nürnberg (loan)	2019–20	2. Bundesliga	11	0	1	0	—		—		—		12	0
VfB Stuttgart (loan)	2020–21	Bundesliga	21	0	1	0	—		—		—		22	0
VfB Stuttgart (loan)	2021–22	Bundesliga	31	4	2	1	—		—		—		33	5
VfB Stuttgart	2022–23	Bundesliga	28	2	4	0	—		—		2 (Note: Appearances in Bundesliga relegation play-offs)	1	34	3
VfB Stuttgart	Stuttgart total		80	6	7	1	—		—		2	1	89	8
West Ham United	2023–24	Premier League	19	1	2	0	3	0	9	0	—		33	1
West Ham United	2024–25	Premier League	33	0	1	0	1	0	—		—		35	0
West Ham United	2025–26	Premier League	31	3	3	0	1	0	—		—		35	3
West Ham United	2026–27	Championship	14	6	0	0	2	0	—		—		16	6
West Ham United	Total		97	10	6	0	7	0	9	0	—		119	10
Career total			209	15	18	1	7	0	10	0	2	1	248	21

=== International ===
As of match played 16 November 2026

Appearances and goals by national team and year
National team	Year	Apps	Goals
Greece	2021	7	0
Greece	2022	8	0
Greece	2023	9	2
Greece	2024	9	0
Greece	2025	7	0
Greece	2026	6	0
Total		46	2

Scores and results list Greece's goal tally first, score column indicates score after each Mavropanos goal.

List of international goals scored by Konstantinos Mavropanos
No.	Date	Venue	Opponent	Score	Result	Competition
1	11 September 2023	Agia Sophia Stadium, Athens, Greece	Gibraltar	2–0	5–0	UEFA Euro 2024 qualifying
2	11 September 2023	Agia Sophia Stadium, Athens, Greece	Gibraltar	4–0	5–0	UEFA Euro 2024 qualifying

== Honours ==
Individual

- West Ham United Hammer of the Year: 2025–26
- EFL Championship Player of the Month: September 2026
