= Christos Tsotras =

Greek footballer

Personal information
- Date of birth: 13 May 2000 (age 26)
- Place of birth: Pyrgos, Elis, Greece
- Height: 1.78 m (5 ft 10 in)
- Position: Forward

Team information
- Current team: Panachaiki
- Number: 71

Youth career
- 2007–2009: Panachaiki
- 2009–2018: Davourlis K. '92
- 2018–2019: Panachaiki

Senior career*
Years	Team	Apps	(Gls)
2019–	Panachaiki	1	(1)
2019–2020	→ Nafpaktiakos Asteras (loan)	10	(1)
- * Club domestic league appearances and goals as of 10 March 2020

Christos Tsotras (Greek: Χρήστος Τσότρας; born 13 May 2000) is a Greek professional footballer who plays as a forward for Super League 2 club Panachaiki.
