= Franck Betra =

French footballer (born 1998)

Personal information
- Full name: Franck Herman Blahoua Betra
- Date of birth: 18 December 1998 (age 27)
- Place of birth: Paris, France
- Height: 1.80 m (5 ft 11 in)
- Position: Forward

Team information
- Current team: Thonon Evian

Youth career
- –2017: Sheffield Wednesday

Senior career*
Years	Team	Apps	(Gls)
2017–2018	PAS Giannina	9	(1)
2018–2019	Trepça '89		
2020	FC 93	1	(0)
2020–2021	Angoulême	9	(1)
2021–2022	Lusitanos Saint-Maur	27	(10)
2022–2023	Rouen	20	(2)
2023–2024	Colmar	7	(0)
2024	Olympique Alès	8	(2)
2024–	Thonon Evian	6	(1)
- * Club domestic league appearances and goals as of 19 October 2024

Franck Herman Blahoua Betra (born 18 December 1996) is a French professional footballer who plays as a forward for Championnat National 3 club Thonon Evian.

== Personal life ==
Born in France with Ivorian descent, Betra refused to play for youth national teams of France because he wanted to remain eligible to represent Ivory Coast at international level.
