= Thomas Garas =

Greek footballer

Personal information
- Date of birth: 18 May 1998 (age 28)
- Place of birth: Thessaloniki, Greece
- Height: 1.89 m (6 ft 2 in)
- Position: Centre-back

Team information
- Current team: Apollon Larissa
- Number: 51

Youth career
- 2014–2018: Cesena
- 2014–2016: → Chievo (loan)
- 2016: → Padova (loan)
- 2016–2017: → Adriese (loan)
- 2017: → Romagna Centro (loan)
- 2017: → PAS Giannina (loan)

Senior career*
Years	Team	Apps	(Gls)
2018–2019	Ermis Amyntaio		
2019–2020	Asteras Itea		
2020	Platanias	1	(0)
2020–2021	Makedonikos		
2022–	Apollon Larissa	0	(0)
- * Club domestic league appearances and goals as of 1 May 2022

Thomas Garas (Greek: Θωμάς Γκάρας; born 18 May 1998) is a Greek professional footballer who plays as a centre-back for Super League 2 club Apollon Larissa.
