= Jonathan Rodríguez (footballer, born 1994) =

Argentine footballer

Personal information
- Full name: Jonathan Joel Rodríguez
- Date of birth: 30 March 1994 (age 32)
- Place of birth: Marcos Juárez, Argentina
- Height: 1.86 m (6 ft 1 in)
- Position: Striker

Youth career
- Argentinos Juniors

Senior career*
Years	Team	Apps	(Gls)
2014–2015	Vélez Sarsfield	0	(0)
2015–2016	Argentinos Juniors	12	(2)
2016	→ Lobos BUAP (loan)	1	(0)
2016–2017	Chacarita Juniors	23	(5)
2017–2018	PAS Giannina	0	(0)
2018	Santiago Morning	3	(0)
- * Club domestic league appearances and goals as of 29 August 2018

Jonathan Joel Rodríguez (born March 30, 1994, in Córdoba, Argentina) is a professional Argentine footballer.

== Club career ==
Raised in Argentinos Juniors youths, he made his debut in the first team on February 22, 2015, taking on 79' Martín Alaniz and scoring shortly after the final 1-1 goal against Club Atlético Colón.

On summer 2017, he signed a 2-year and a half contract with PAS Giannina. On December 19, 2017, he released from PAS Giannina. He didn't participate in any football match.
