= Iraklis Garoufalias =

Greek footballer

Personal information
- Date of birth: 1 May 1993 (age 33)
- Place of birth: Athens, Greece
- Height: 1.85 m (6 ft 1 in)
- Position: Midfielder

Team information
- Current team: Athens Kallithea
- Number: 6

Youth career
- 2010–2012: AEK Athens

Senior career*
Years	Team	Apps	(Gls)
2012–2013	AEK Athens	0	(0)
2013	→ Asteras Magoula (loan)	5	(0)
2013–2014	Fostiras	20	(0)
2014–2018	PAS Giannina	49	(1)
2018–2020	Atromitos	1	(0)
2019	→ Apollon Smyrnis (loan)	9	(0)
2020–2021	Olympiakos Nicosia	21	(0)
2021–2023	AEL	14	(0)
2024	Egaleo	18	(1)
2024–2025	Diagoras	20	(0)
2025–2026	Hellas Syros	23	(4)
2026–	Athens Kallithea	2	(0)
- * Club domestic league appearances and goals as of 20 September 2026

Iraklis Garoufalias (Greek: Ηρακλής Γαρουφαλιάς; born 1 May 1993) is a Greek professional footballer who plays as a defensive midfielder for Super League 2 club Athens Kallithea.
