= Edelino Ié =

Bissau-Guinean footballer

Personal information
- Full name: Edelino Miguel Ié
- Date of birth: 1 May 1994 (age 32)
- Place of birth: Bissau, Guinea-Bissau
- Height: 1.80 m (5 ft 11 in)
- Position: Midfielder

Youth career
- União Bissau
- 2007–2008: Oeiras
- 2008–2013: Sporting CP

Senior career*
Years	Team	Apps	(Gls)
2013–2016	Sporting CP B	13	(0)
2015	→ Kruoja (loan)	17	(1)
2015–2016	→ Cinfães (loan)	27	(4)
2016–2018	Braga B	28	(0)
2018	Cinfães	10	(0)
2018–2019	Felgueiras 1932	26	(3)
2019–2020	Gondomar	23	(2)
2020–2021	Fontinhas	4	(0)
2021–2022	Mirandela	13	(1)
2022–2023	Resende	24	(2)
2023	Tłuchowia Tłuchowo	10	(2)
2024–2025	Celoricense	7	(1)
- * Club domestic league appearances and goals as of 14:37, 17 April 2026 (UTC)

Edelino Miguel Ié (Portuguese pronunciation: [ˈjɛ]; born 1 May 1994) is a Bissau-Guinean footballer who plays as a midfielder.

He made 41 Segunda Liga appearances for Sporting CP B and Braga B, but spent most of his career in the lower leagues.

== Club career ==
Born in Bissau, Guinea Bissau, Ié joined Sporting CP's youth system in 2008, aged 14. He was promoted to the B team for the 2012–13 season, in the Segunda Liga.

Ié made his debut in the competition on 23 January 2013, coming on as a substitute for João Mário in a 2–1 away win against Covilhã. It was one of only two appearances during the campaign.

On 25 February 2015, Ié was loaned to Kruoja in the Lithuanian A Lyga. He scored his first senior goal on 25 June, to equalise in a 1–1 home draw against Stumbras.

On 12 September 2015, Ié was loaned to Cinfães from the Campeonato de Portugal for the rest of the season. The following day, he made his debut for his new team, playing 27 minutes and concluding a 3–0 home victory over Sobrado.

Ié joined Braga ahead of the 2016–17 season, being assigned to their reserves in the second division. He was released on 15 January 2018 and, the following day, signed a six-month contract with PAS Giannina with the option to extend for an additional two years depending on performances; the transfer to the latter club was, however, cancelled for personal reasons.

In February 2018, Ié returned to Portugal's third tier and Cinfães. He spent the ensuing years in the same division, with Felgueiras 1932, Gondomar and Fontinhas.

In summer 2023, Ié joined Tłuchowia Tłuchowo in the Polish IV liga. In May 2024, Dinamo București launched an investigation following accusations that new signing Edgar Ié had sent his twin to play for the Romanian club instead.

== Personal life ==
Ié's twin brother, Edgar, was also a footballer. A defender, he too was trained at Sporting.

== Career statistics ==
As of match played 6 January 2018

Appearances and goals by club, season and competition
Club	Season	League			Cup		League Cup		Europe		Total	
Club	Season	Division	Apps	Goals	Apps	Goals	Apps	Goals	Apps	Goals	Apps	Goals
Sporting CP B	2012–13	Segunda Liga	2	0	—		—		—		2	0
Sporting CP B	2013–14	Segunda Liga	11	0	—		—		—		11	0
Sporting CP B	Total		13	0	—		—		—		13	0
Kruoja (loan)	2015	A Lyga	17	1	0	0	—		0	0	17	1
Cinfães (loan)	2015–16	Campeonato de Portugal	27	4	0	0	—		—		27	4
Braga B	2016–17	LigaPro	14	0	—		—		—		14	0
Braga B	2017–18	LigaPro	14	0	—		—		—		14	0
Braga B	Total		85	5	0	0	0	0	0	0	85	5
