= Nikos Vafeas =

Greek footballer

Personal information
- Full name: Nikolaos Vafeas
- Date of birth: 21 February 1997 (age 29)
- Place of birth: Thessaloniki, Greece
- Height: 1.87 m (6 ft 2 in)
- Position: Centre-back

Team information
- Current team: Niki Volos
- Number: 2

Youth career
- –2013: Aias Evosmou
- 2013–2016: Agrotikos Asteras

Senior career*
| Years | Team | Apps | (Gls) |
| 2016–2017 | Agrotikos Asteras | 23 | (1) |
| 2017–2020 | Apollon Smyrnis | 20 | (2) |
| 2018 | → OFI (loan) | 14 | (2) |
| 2020–2021 | OFI | 20 | (1) |
| 2021–2022 | Ionikos | 19 | (2) |
| 2022–2024 | A.E. Kifisia | 47 | (4) |
| 2024–2025 | AEL | 25 | (2) |
| 2025–2026 | Kalamata | 23 | (3) |
| 2026– | Niki Volos | 0 | (0) |

International career^{‡}
| 2017 | Greece U21 | 3 | (0) |
- * Club domestic league appearances and goals as of 2 April 2026 ‡ National team caps and goals as of 20 December 2017

Nikos Vafeas (Greek: Νίκος Βαφέας; born 21 February 1997) is a Greek professional footballer who plays as a centre-back for Super League 2 club Niki Volos.

== Career ==
On 29 June 2017, he signed a contract with Apollon Smyrnis.

On 23 January 2020, following his release from Apollon Smyrnis, he joined OFI on a two-and-a-half-year contract.

On 28 June 2021, Vafeas signed a contract with Ionikos.

== Career statistics ==
As of 2 April 2026

| Club | Season | League | | | Cup | | Continental | | Other | | Total | |
| Club | Season | Division | Apps | Goals | Apps | Goals | Apps | Goals | Apps | Goals | Apps | Goals |
|---|---|---|---|---|---|---|---|---|---|---|---|---|
| Agrotikos Asteras | 2015–16 | Superleague Greece 2 | 5 | 1 | 0 | 0 | — | | — | | 5 | 1 |
| Agrotikos Asteras | 2016–17 | Superleague Greece 2 | 18 | 0 | 3 | 0 | — | | — | | 21 | 0 |
| Agrotikos Asteras | Total | | 23 | 1 | 3 | 0 | — | | — | | 26 | 1 |
| Apollon Smyrnis | 2017–18 | Superleague Greece | 0 | 0 | 1 | 0 | — | | — | | 1 | 0 |
| Apollon Smyrnis | 2018–19 | Superleague Greece | 18 | 2 | 4 | 0 | — | | — | | 22 | 2 |
| Apollon Smyrnis | 2019–20 | Superleague Greece 2 | 2 | 0 | 0 | 0 | — | | — | | 2 | 0 |
| Apollon Smyrnis | Total | | 20 | 2 | 5 | 0 | — | | — | | 25 | 2 |
| OFI (loan) | 2017–18 | Superleague Greece 2 | 14 | 2 | — | | — | | — | | 14 | 2 |
| OFI | 2019–20 | Superleague Greece | 6 | 0 | — | | — | | — | | 6 | 0 |
| OFI | 2020–21 | Superleague Greece | 14 | 1 | 2 | 0 | 0 | 0 | — | | 16 | 1 |
| OFI | Total | | 20 | 1 | 2 | 0 | 0 | 0 | — | | 22 | 1 |
| Ionikos | 2021–22 | Superleague Greece | 19 | 2 | 3 | 0 | — | | — | | 22 | 2 |
| A.E. Kifisia | 2022–23 | Superleague Greece 2 | 25 | 2 | 3 | 0 | — | | — | | 28 | 2 |
| A.E. Kifisia | 2023–24 | Superleague Greece | 22 | 2 | 2 | 1 | — | | — | | 24 | 3 |
| A.E. Kifisia | Total | | 47 | 4 | 5 | 1 | — | | — | | 52 | 5 |
| AEL | 2024–25 | Superleague Greece 2 | 27 | 3 | 2 | 0 | — | | — | | 29 | 3 |
| Kalamata | 2025–26 | Superleague Greece 2 | 24 | 3 | 1 | 0 | — | | — | | 25 | 3 |
| Career total | | | 193 | 18 | 21 | 1 | 0 | 0 | 0 | 0 | 216 | 19 |

== Honours ==
OFI

- Football League: 2017–18
