= Georgios Litskas =

Greek footballer

Personal information
- Full name: Georgios Litskas
- Date of birth: 16 June 1995 (age 31)
- Place of birth: Alexandroupoli, Greece
- Height: 1.87 m (6 ft 2 in)
- Position: Striker

Team information
- Current team: Apollon Paralimnio

Youth career
- Panthrakikos

Senior career*
Years	Team	Apps	(Gls)
2014–2015	Panthrakikos	2	(0)
2015–2016	Evros Soufli	14	(2)
2016–2017	Kavala	29	(10)
2017–2018	Doxa Drama	13	(2)
2018–2019	Karaiskakis	5	(1)
2019	Kavala	8	(4)
2019–2020	Nestos Chrysoupoli	12	(11)
2020	Doxa Drama	2	(0)
2020–2021	Tilikratis	0	(0)
2021–	Apollon Paralimnio	0	(0)
- * Club domestic league appearances and goals as of 10 February 2020

Georgios Litskas (Greek: Γεώργιος Λίτσκας; born 16 June 1995) is a Greek professional footballer who plays as a striker for Apollon Paralimnio. His hometown is Alexandroupoli where he was born on 16 June 1995.

== Honours ==
Kavala

- Gamma Ethniki: 2018–19
