= Makis Giannikoglou =

Greek footballer (born 1993)

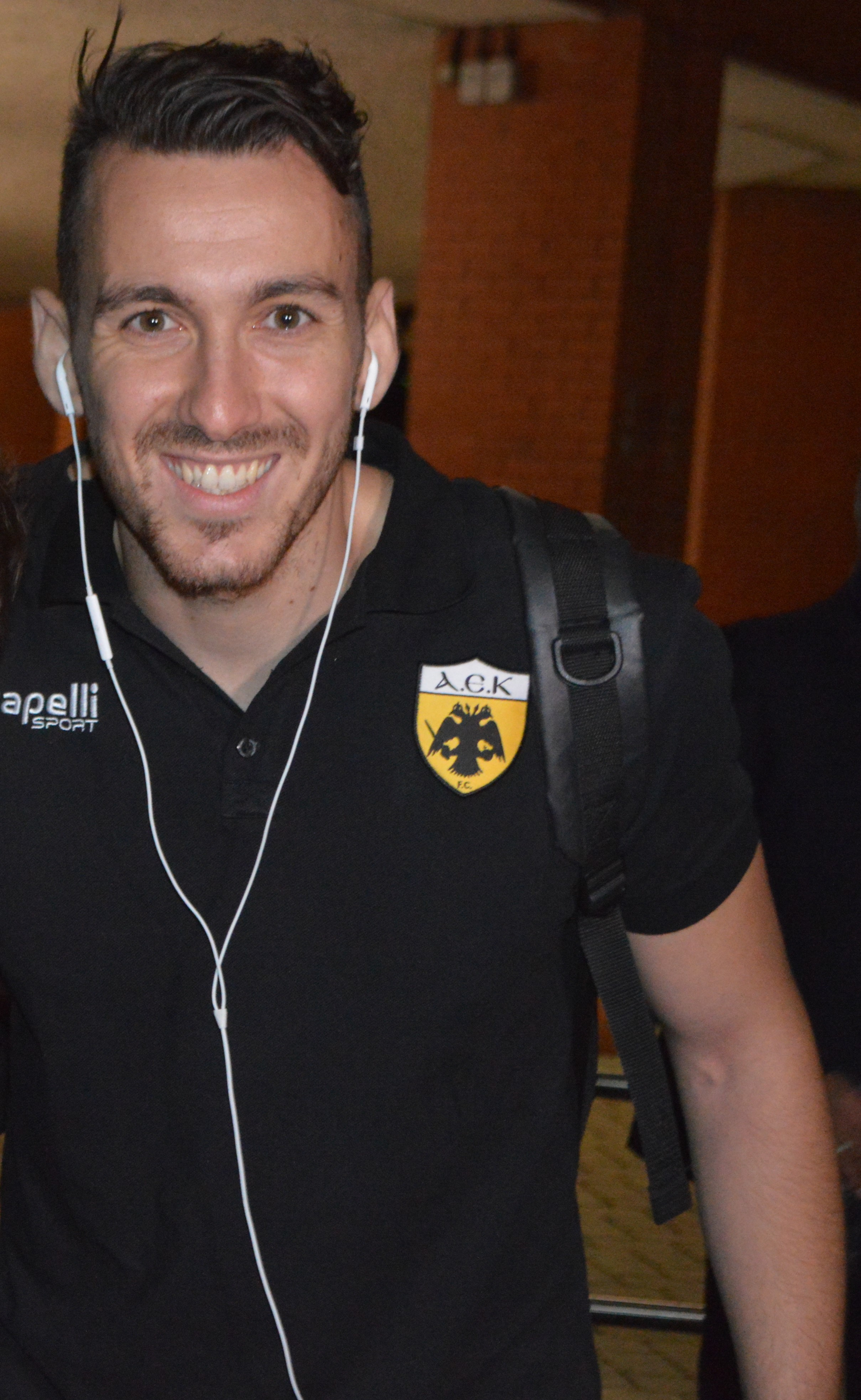
- Giannikoglou with AEK Athens in 2018

Personal information
- Full name: Serafeim Giannikoglou
- Date of birth: 25 March 1993 (age 33)
- Place of birth: Kavala, Greece
- Height: 1.89 m (6 ft 2 1/2 in)
- Position: Goalkeeper

Team information
- Current team: PAS Pyrgos
- Number: 1

Youth career
- –2011: Skoda Xanthi

Senior career*
Years	Team	Apps	(Gls)
2011–2013	Omonia	0	(0)
2013–2014	Kavala	23	(0)
2014	Fokikos	0	(0)
2015–2017	Iraklis	6	(0)
2017–2018	PAS Giannina	4	(0)
2018–2019	AEK Athens	0	(0)
2019–2021	PAS Giannina	2	(0)
2021–2022	Sūduva	22	(0)
2022–2023	Panserraikos	12	(0)
2023–2024	Kalamata	9	(0)
2024–2025	Iraklis	1	(0)
2025–2026	Kavala	22	(0)
2026–	PAS Pyrgos	3	(0)

International career
2009–2010	Greece U17	3	(0)
- * Club domestic league appearances and goals as of 21 September 2026

Makis Giannikoglou (Greek: Μάκης Γιαννίκογλου, born 25 March 1993) is a Greek professional footballer who plays as a goalkeeper for Super League 2 club PAS Pyrgos.

He started his football in the youth ranks of Xanthi. Professionally he has played for Omonia, Kavala, Fokikos, Iraklis, PAS Giannina, AEK Athens and Lithuanian FK Sūduva. He has been capped for Greece U17.

== Club career ==
Giannikoglou was playing for the reserve team of Skoda Xanthi. Later on, in 2011 he signed a contract with the Cypriot team Omonia. In July 2014 he signed for Fokikos. On 30 December 2014 he signed for Iraklis for two and a half years.

=== PAS Giannina ===
On 10 August 2017 he signed for PAS Giannina for a year.

=== AEK Athens ===
On 26 June 2018, Giannikoglou signed with AEK Athens until the summer of 2021. The 25-year old goalkeeper Giannikoglou, who only made four Super League appearances with PAS Giannina in the 2017–18 campaign, has signed a three-year deal with AEK after his PAS Giannina's contract reached its conclusion. AEK confirmed the transfer with this following statement on their official website: “AEK FC announces the arrival of goalkeeper Makis Giannikoglou, who has signed a cooperation agreement until the summer of 2021.” In an interview with the official AEK's site, Giannikoglou shared his emotions from the move: “I am very happy to be an AEK player, it’s a dream come true,” beamed Giannikoglou. “I am delighted to work with Vasilis Barkas and Panagiotis Tsintotas, the goalkeepers which made AEK champions alongside Giannis Anestis. It’s a great incentive for any Greek footballer to wear the AEK shirt, my goal is to work hard and be ready for when I receive a chance.”

=== PAS Giannina ===
On 13 June 2019, Giannikoglou returned to PAS Giannina. With PAS Giannina, he won the Football League: 2019–20 and got promoted to the Super League Greece.

== International career ==
Giannikoglou debuted for Greece U17 in 2009 in a friendly match against Belarus national under-17 football team. He appeared in two more matches in 2010 UEFA European Under-17 Championship in Liechtenstein.

== Career statistics ==
=== Club ===
As of 28 April 2022

Club	Season	League			Cup		Continental^{[A]}		Others^{[B]}		Total	
Club	Season	Division	Apps	Goals	Apps	Goals	Apps	Goals	Apps	Goals	Apps	Goals
Kavala	2013–14	Football League Greece	23	0	1	0	–	–	–	–	24	0
Fokikos	2014–15	Football League Greece	0	0	1	0	–	–	–	–	1	0
Iraklis	2014–15	Football League Greece	2	0	1	0	–	–	–	–	3	0
Iraklis	2015–16	Super League Greece	2	0	0	0	–	–	–	–	2	0
Iraklis	2016–17	Super League Greece	2	0	1	0	–	–	–	–	3	0
Iraklis	Total		6	0	2	0	0	0	0	0	8	0
PAS Giannina	2017–18	Super League Greece	4	0	4	0	–	–	–	–	8	0
AEK Athens	2018–19	Super League Greece	0	0	0	0	–	–	–	–	0	0
PAS Giannina	2019–20	Super League Greece 2	2	0	3	0	0	0	0	0	5	0
PAS Giannina	2020–21	Super League Greece	0	0	0	0	0	0	0	0	0	0
Sūduva	2021	A Lyga	22	0	1	0	0	0	0	0	23	0
Sūduva	2022	A Lyga	0	0	0	0	4	0	0	0	4	0
Career total			57	0	11	0	4	0	0	0	73	0

== Honours ==
=== Sūduva ===
- Lithuanian Supercup: 2022
- Lithuanian Championship: Runner-Up 2021

=== Omonia ===
- Cypriot Cup: 2012
- Cyprus FA Shield: 2012

=== PAS Giannina ===
- Super League Greece 2: 2019–20
