= Pantelis Theologou =

Greek footballer

Personal information
- Full name: Panteleimon Theologou
- Date of birth: 7 May 1991 (age 35)
- Place of birth: Plettenberg, Germany
- Height: 1.89 m (6 ft 2 in)
- Position: Centre-back

Team information
- Current team: Egaleo
- Number: 2

Youth career
- 2010–2011: Ethnikos Asteras

Senior career*
Years	Team	Apps	(Gls)
2011–2013	Ethnikos Asteras	11	(1)
2013–2014	Kallithea	18	(0)
2014–2016	Atromitos	2	(0)
2015	→ OFI (loan)	0	(0)
2016–2017	Chania	12	(1)
2017–2018	Karaiskakis	25	(0)
2018–2020	Apollon Pontus	28	(0)
2020	Panachaiki	4	(0)
2020	Aspropyrgos	0	(0)
2021	Karaiskakis	20	(3)
2021–2022	AEL	7	(0)
- * Club domestic league appearances and goals as of 19:00, 15 September 2022 (UTC)

Pantelis Theologou (Greek: Παντελής Θεολόγου; born 7 May 1991) is a Greek professional footballer who plays as a centre-back for Super League 2 club Egaleo.
