= Apostolos Skondras =

Greek footballer

Personal information
- Date of birth: 29 December 1988 (age 37)
- Place of birth: Athens, Greece
- Height: 1.85 m (6 ft 1 in)
- Position: Centre-back

Team information
- Current team: Anagennisi Karditsa
- Number: 44

Youth career
- 2006: Atromitos

Senior career*
Years	Team	Apps	(Gls)
2006–2007	Atromitos	0	(0)
2007–2008	Panegialios	29	(1)
2008–2009	Atromitos	2	(0)
2009–2010	Panargiakos	28	(2)
2010–2011	Diagoras	23	(0)
2011–2012	Thrasyvoulos	27	(3)
2012–2013	AEL	30	(2)
2013–2020	PAS Giannina	93	(3)
2020–2022	Veria	48	(2)
2022–	Anagennisi Karditsa	22	(2)
- * Club domestic league appearances and goals as of 15 June 2023

Apostolos Skondras (Greek: Απόστολος Σκόνδρας, born 29 December 1988) is a Greek professional footballer who plays as a centre-back for Super League 2 club Anagennisi Karditsa.

== Career ==
He started his career from the youth academies of Atromitos and is the older brother of Ioannis Skondras. He has played in clubs of lower leagues such as Panargiakos, Diagoras and Thrasyvoulos where he had successful seasons. On 20 July 2012, he signed a 1-year contract with AEL.

On 29 July 2013 he signed contract with PAS Giannina.

== Honours ==
PAS Giannina

- Super League 2: 2019–20

Veria

- Football League: 2020–21
