= Dimitrios Loufakis =

Greek footballer

Personal information
- Full name: Dimitrios Loufakis
- Date of birth: 1 April 2000 (age 26)
- Place of birth: Thessaloniki, Greece
- Height: 1.74 m (5 ft 8 1/2 in)
- Position: Right winger

Team information
- Current team: Apollon Pontus
- Number: 17

Youth career
- 2008–2016: PAOK
- 2016–2018: Iraklis
- 2018–2019: Apollon Pontus

Senior career*
| Years | Team | Apps | (Gls) |
| 2019–2020 | Apollon Pontus | 20 | (0) |
| 2020–2021 | AEL | 3 | (0) |
| 2021 | Panserraikos | 12 | (1) |
| 2022– | Apollon Pontus | 16 | (1) |
- * Club domestic league appearances and goals as of 27 April 2022

Dimitrios Loufakis (Greek: Δημήτριος Λουφάκης; born 1 April 2000) is a Greek professional footballer who plays as a right winger for Apollon Pontus.
