= Konstantinos Papadopoulos (footballer, born 2000) =

Greek footballer

Personal information
- Full name: Konstantinos Papadopoulos
- Date of birth: 8 August 2000 (age 26)
- Place of birth: Ioannina, Greece
- Height: 1.80 m (5 ft 11 in)
- Position: Midfielder

Team information
- Current team: Diagoras
- Number: 22

Youth career
- 2010–2015: AO Giannina
- 2015–2018: PAS Giannina

Senior career*
Years	Team	Apps	(Gls)
2018–2019	PAS Giannina	0	(0)
2019–2020	Diagoras Vrachneika	9	(0)
2020–2021	Panachaiki	15	(1)
2021–	Diagoras	1	(0)
- * Club domestic league appearances and goals as of 31 December 2021

Konstantinos Papadopoulos (Greek: Κωνσταντίνος Παπαδόπουλος; born 8 August 2000) is a Greek professional footballer who plays as a midfielder for Super League 2 club Diagoras.
