= Nikos Kritikos =

Greek footballer

Personal information
- Full name: Nikolaos Spyridon Kritikos
- Date of birth: 1 November 1994 (age 31)
- Place of birth: Corfu, Greece
- Height: 1.87 m (6 ft 2 in)
- Position: Defensive midfielder

Team information
- Current team: Asteras Petriti

Youth career
- Olympiacos

Senior career*
Years	Team	Apps	(Gls)
2012–2013	AO Kerkyra	14	(0)
2013–2016	AOK Kerkyra	47	(0)
2016–2017	Panionios	0	(0)
2017	Apollon Smyrnis	8	(0)
2017–2020	AOK Kerkyra	42	(1)
2020	Ionikos	6	(0)
2020–2022	Panserraikos	44	(0)
2023	Trikala		
2023–	Asteras Petriti		

International career^{‡}
2010	Greece U17	1	(0)
2013	Greece U19	2	(0)
- * Club domestic league appearances and goals as of 13 November 2021 ‡ National team caps and goals as of 15 May 2013

Nikos Kritikos (Greek: Νίκος Κρητικός; born 1 November 1994) is a Greek professional footballer who plays as a defensive midfielder.
