= 2020–21 Ergotelis F.C. season =

Season of a Greek football club

Ergotelis
2020–21 season
- Chairman: Maged Samy
- Manager: Giannis Taousianis (2 September 2019 − present)
- Stadium: Pankritio Stadium, Heraklion
- Super League 2: 4th, Play-offs 4th
- Greek Cup: DNP
- Top goalscorer: League: Giorgos Manousakis (10 goals); All: Giorgos Manousakis (10 goals)
Home colours	Away colours

The 2020–21 season is Ergotelis' 91st season in existence and 14th overall in the second tier of the Greek football league system, and second after the foundation of the Super League 2. The contents of this article cover club activities from 1 July 2020 until 30 May 2021.

The season began for the club in January 2021, after a lengthy postponement of the Super League 2 championship due to the ongoing COVID-19 pandemic. As a result, Ergotelis, along with all other clubs participating in the competition, were excluded from participation in this year's edition of the Greek Football Cup, which was held only with the 14 teams participating in the Super League.

After overcoming a slow start with two losses in the first two games, Ergotelis impressed with performances during the First round of the tournament, where the team went 7-1-0 over the next 8 games. After a sluggish start to the Second round, Ergotelis entered the Promotion Play-offs in 4th place. The club won all its playoffs matches against fellow promotion contenders, until eventually going down 2−1 vs. Ionikos in the final match of the season, finishing in 4th place. The game raised much controversy due to the presence of Ionikos fans at Neapoli Stadium despite lockdown regulations, as well as questionable decisions by referee Vasilios Fotias late in the game.

== Players ==
Summer acquisition Winter acquisition

No.	Name	Nationality	Position (s)	Date of Birth (Age)	Signed from	Notes
Goalkeepers
1	Dimitrios Katsimitros	(Greece)	GK	12 June 1997 (23)	(Cyprus) Anorthosis Famagusta	
40	Giorgos Tzelepis	(Greece)	GK	12 November 1999 (21)	(Greece) Xanthi	
75	Nikos Psimopoulos	(Greece)	GK	19 June 2003 (17)	Youth system	
Defenders
5	Christos Batzios	(Greece)	CB	15 October 1991 (29)	(Greece) Kavala	
8	Kyriakos Mazoulouxis	(Greece)	CB	1 May 1997 (24)	Free agent	
14	Nikos Peios	(Greece)	CB	17 June 1999 (21)	(Greece) Olympiacos U−20	
33	Giannis Theodorakis	(Greece)	CB	8 June 2001 (19)	Youth system	
80	Edison Kola	(Albania) (Greece)	CB	3 April 2001 (20)	Youth system	
89	Georgios Sarris	(Greece)	CB	9 August 1989 (31)	(Albania) Flamurtari	
18	Georgios Servilakis	(Greece)	LB	18 May 1997 (24)	(Greece) Thesprotos	
24	Stelios Pozatzidis	(Greece)	LB	34 July 1994 (26)	(Greece) Platanias	
77	Arthur Bote	(Brazil)	LB	7 January 1997 (24)	(Portugal) Sintrense	
2	Jeffrey Neral	(Netherlands)	RB / DM	9 December 1997 (23)	(Netherlands) Helmond Sport	
26	Paris Doumanis	(Greece)	RB	30 October 2000 (20)	(Greece) Olympiacos U−19	
Midfielders
20	Antonis Alexakis	(Greece)	CM	2 July 2001 (19)	Youth system	
23	Giannis Boutsakis	(Greece)	CM	8 February 1994 (27)	(Greece) Atsalenios	
10	Antonis Bourselis (VC)	(Greece)	AM	6 July 1994 (26)	(Greece) OFI	
17	Oresti Kacurri	(Albania)	AM	25 February 1998 (23)	Youth system	
38	Ilias Tselios	(Greece)	AM	6 October 1997 (23)	(Greece) AEK Athens	
22	Abdulsamed Abdullahi	(Somalia) (Netherlands)	LM	19 January 1997 (24)	(Netherlands) Den Bosch	
Forwards
28	Sotirios Kokkinis	(Greece) (Germany)	LW	11 July 2000 (20)	(Netherlands) Willem II U−21	
27	Charles Kwateng	(Belgium) (Ghana)	RW	27 May 1997 (24)	(Belgium) Lierse	
7	Giorgos Manousakis	(Greece)	CF	10 April 1998 (23)	Youth system	
9	Themis Patrinos	(Greece)	CF	18 January 2001 (20)	Youth system	
11	Tyrone Conraad	(Netherlands)	CF	7 March 1997 (24)	(Netherlands) Kozakken Boys	
21	Thanasis Kostanasios	(Greece)	CF	11 January 1999 (22)	(Greece) Olympiacos	
	Stathis Kapouranis	(Greece)	CF	20 September 2001 (19)	Youth system	

=== The following players have departed in mid-season ===
6	Giannis Koutantos	(Greece)	AM	31 January 2000 (21)	Youth system	Loaned out to Episkopi

Note: Flags indicate national team as has been defined under FIFA eligibility rules. Players and Managers may hold more than one non-FIFA nationality.

Head coach	Captain	Kit manufacturer	Shirt sponsor
(Greece) Giannis Taousianis	(Greece) Christos Batzios	(United States) Capelli Sport	(Greece) Vitex

== Transfers ==
Winter Transfer Window

=== In ===
Squad #	Position	Player	Transferred from	Fee	Date	Ref
15	DF	(Greece) Dimitris Voutsas	(Greece) Triglia	Loan return	30 June 2020	
11	FW	(Netherlands) Tyrone Conraad	(Netherlands) Kozakken Boys	Free	27 July 2020	
2	DF	(Netherlands) Jeffrey Neral	(Netherlands) Helmond Sport	Free	27 July 2020	
18	DF	(Greece) Georgios Servilakis	(Greece) Thesprotos	Free	30 July 2020	
21	FW	(Greece) Thanasis Kostanasios	(Greece) Olympiacos	Free	12 August 2020	
22	MF	(Somalia) (Netherlands) Abdulsamed Abdullahi	(Netherlands) Den Bosch	Free	31 August 2020	
24	DF	(Greece) Stelios Pozatzidis	(Greece) Platanias	Free	30 September 2020	
89	DF	(Greece) Georgios Sarris	(Albania) Flamurtari	Free	13 October 2020	
28	FW	(Greece) (Germany) Sotirios Kokkinis	(Netherlands) Willem II U−21	Free	19 January 2021	
26	DF	(Greece) Paris Doumanis	(Greece) Olympiacos U−19	Free	19 January 2021	

==== Promoted from youth system ====
Squad #	Position	Player	Date	Signed Until	Ref
33	DF	(Greece) Giannis Theodorakis	10 September 2020	30 June 2024	
80	DF	(Albania) (Greece) Edison Kola	10 September 2020	30 June 2024	
6	MF	(Greece) Giannis Koutantos	10 September 2020	30 June 2024	
9	FW	(Greece) Themis Patrinos	10 September 2020	30 June 2024	
	FW	(Greece) Stathis Kapouranis	30 October 2020	30 June 2024	

==== Re-signings ====
Squad #	Position	Player	Date	Signed Until	Ref
5	DF	(Greece) Christos Batzios	13 October 2020	30 June 2021	

=== Out ===
Position	Player	Transferred To	Fee	Date	Ref
GK	(Greece) Manolis Kalogerakis	Free agent	Free	30 June 2020	
DF	(Slovakia) Dominik Špiriak	(Slovakia) Dunajská Streda	Loan return	30 June 2020	
DF	(Portugal) Vítor Barata	(Greece) OF Ierapetra	Free	30 June 2020	
DF	(Greece) Michalis Bousis	(Greece) AEK Athens	Loan return	1 July 2020	
FW	(Egypt) (Hungary) Ramez Medhat	(Egypt) Wadi Degla	Loan return	1 July 2020	
FW	(Egypt) Ahmet Atef	(Egypt) Wadi Degla	Loan return	1 July 2020	
DF	(Greece) Christos Batzios	Free agent	Free	1 July 2020	
FW	(Greece) Manolis Rovithis	(Cyprus) Alki Oroklini	Free	1 July 2020	
DF	(Greece) Giannis Kiliaras	(Greece) Irodotos	Free	1 July 2020	
DF	(Greece) Konstantinos Provydakis	(Greece) Lamia	Free	1 July 2020	
FW	(United States) Joseph Efford	(Belgium) Waasland-Beveren	Free	1 July 2020	
DF	(Greece) Dimitris Voutsas	(Greece) A.E. Evosmos	Free	23 July 2020	
FW	(Greece) Antonis Stathopoulos	(Greece) Ialysos	Free	23 July 2020	
FW	(Greece) Giannis Iatroudis	(Greece) AEK Athens	Free	24 July 2020	
MF	(Ghana) Albert Bruce	(Greece) Panachaiki	▲ Undisclosed	14 August 2020	
FW	(Greece) Nektarios Azizi	(Greece) Almyros Gazi	Loan	10 September 2020	
MF	(Greece) Giannis Koutantos	(Greece) Episkopi	Loan	26 March 2021	

=== Transfer summary ===
Undisclosed fees are not included in the transfer totals.

Expenditure

Summer: ▼€0,000

Winter: ▼€0,000

Total: ▼€0,000

Income

Summer: ▲€0,000

Winter: ▲€0,000

Total: ▲€0,000

Net totals

Summer: ▲€0,000

Winter: ▲€0,000

Total: ▲€0,000

== Kit ==
2020−21

Supplier: Capelli
Sponsor(s): Vitex

Home	Away

Source: ergotelisfc.gr

Variations

Supplier: Capelli
Sponsor(s): None

Alternate

Source: ergotelis.gr

Friendlies

Supplier: Capelli
Sponsor(s): None

Friendlies #1	Friendlies #2

Source: ergotelis.gr

== Preseason and friendlies ==
=== Preseason friendlies ===
Win Draw Loss

14 August 2020 Friendly	Ergotelis (Greece)	2 − 1	(Greece) Rethymniakos	Heraklion, Crete, Greece
18:30 EEST	Conraad 38'; Patrinos 55'	Report	Delimpasis 6' (pen.)	Stadium: Pankritio Stadium; Referee: Christos Krasagakis (Heraklion)

22 August 2020 Friendly	Irodotos (Greece)	2 − 1	(Greece) Ergotelis	Nea Alikarnassos, Crete, Greece
18:00 EEST	Mylonas 45'; Kalamiotis 77'	Report	Bourselis 14'	Stadium: Nea Alikarnassos Municipal Stadium; Referee: Christos Krasagakis (Heraklion)

28 August 2020 Friendly	Ergotelis (Greece)	1 − 0	(Greece) Giouchtas	Heraklion, Crete, Greece
18:00 EEST	Conraad 24' (pen.)	Report		Stadium: Pankritio Stadium

5 September 2020 Friendly	OFI (Greece)	0 − 2	(Greece) Ergotelis	Heraklion, Crete, Greece
20:00 EEST		Report	Manousakis 7', 41' (pen.)	Stadium: Theodoros Vardinogiannis Stadium; Referee: Petros Tsagkarakis (Chania)

16 September 2020 Friendly	Ergotelis (Greece)	0 – 1	(Greece) Giouchtas	Agios Nikolaos, Crete, Greece
		Report	Mpeladakis 70'	Stadium: Agios Nikolaos Municipal Stadium

19 September 2020 Friendly	Ergotelis (Greece)	2 − 0	(Greece) Almyros Gazi	Agios Nikolaos, Crete, Greece
19:15 EEST	Bourselis 80'; Kostanasios 90'	Report		Stadium: Agios Nikolaos Municipal Stadium

27 September 2020 Friendly	OF Ierapetra (Greece)	1 − 2	(Greece) Ergotelis	Ierapetra, Crete, Greece
17:15 EEST	Fouasis 19'	Report	Tselios 52'; Kostanasios 65'	Stadium: Petros Vouzounerakis Stadium

11 October 2020 Friendly	Ergotelis (Greece)	3 − 0	(Greece) Irodotos	Heraklion, Crete, Greece
16:45 EEST	Manousakis 8', 90'; Boutsakis 29'	Report		Stadium: Pankritio Stadium

25 October 2020 Friendly	Ergotelis (Greece)	2 − 0	(Greece) OF Ierapetra	Heraklion, Crete, Greece
15.00 EET	Manousakis 25' (pen.), 37'	Report		Stadium: Pankritio Stadium; Referee: Alexandros Zafeiris (Heraklion)

== Competitions ==
=== Overview ===
Competition	Started round	Current position / round	Final position / round	First match	Last match
Super League 2	1	4th/22	4th/22	17 January 2021	21 April 2021
Super League 2 Play-offs	1	4th/5	4th/5	28 April 2021	19 May 2021

Last updated: 19 May 2021

== Super League 2 ==
=== Regular season ===
==== League table ====
Pos	Team	Pld	W	D	L	GF	GA	GD	Pts	Qualification
2	Levadiakos	22	11	8	3	32	12	+20	41	Qualification for the Play-off round
3	Xanthi	22	11	8	3	24	10	+14	41	Qualification for the Play-off round
4	Ergotelis	22	11	3	8	29	15	+14	36	Qualification for the Play-off round
5	Chania	22	9	8	5	18	13	+5	35	Qualification for the Play-off round
6	Diagoras Rodos	22	8	6	8	18	23	−5	30	Qualification for the Play-off round

Source: sl2fl.gr
Rules for classification: 1) Points; 2) Head-to-head points; 3) Head-to-head goal difference; 4) Goals scored; 5) Goals against; 6) Play-offs (neutral ground, only used if needed to decide teams for promotion or relegation).

==== Results summary ====
Overall								Home						Away					
Pld	W	D	L	GF	GA	GD	Pts	W	D	L	GF	GA	GD	W	D	L	GF	GA	GD
22	11	3	8	29	15	+14	36	6	0	5	18	8	+10	5	3	3	11	7	+4

Last updated: 21 April 2021.
Source: Competitive matches

==== Results by Round ====
Round	1	2	3	4	5	6	7	8	9	10	11	12	13	14	15	16	17	18	19	20	21	22
Ground	H	A	H	A	A	H	A	H	A	H	H	A	H	A	H	H	A	H	A	H	A	A
Result	L	L	L	W	W	W	D	W	W	W	W	W	W	L	L	L	L	L	D	W	D	W
Position	11	12	12	7	7	6	5	4	3	1	1	1	1	1	1	3	4	4	5	4	5	4

Updated to match(es) played on 21 April 2021. Source: footballleaguenews.gr
A = Away; H = Home; W = Win; D = Draw; L = Loss

==== Matches ====
Win Draw Loss Postponed

17 January 2021 1	Ergotelis	0 − 1	Ionikos	Heraklion, Crete, Greece
14:00 EET	Servilakis (yellow card) 13'; Abdullahi (yellow card) 27'; Batzios (yellow card) 42'; Peios (yellow card) 78'	Report	Castro 6'; Manalis (yellow card) 34'; Kyrgias (yellow card) 50'; Korbos (yellow card) 60'	Stadium: Pankritio Stadium; Attendance: 0 (closed doors); Referee: Angelos Aggelakis (Macedonia)

24 January 2021 3	Ergotelis	0 − 1	Levadiakos	Heraklion, Crete, Greece
14:45 EET	Peios (yellow card) 25'; Conraad (yellow card) 76'; Abdullahi (yellow card) 83'	Report	Liagas (yellow card) 11'; Poletto (yellow card) 55', (goal) 80'; Mygas (yellow card) 63'; Karachalios (yellow card) 66'	Stadium: Pankritio Stadium; Attendance: 0 (closed doors); Referee: Andreas Gkamaris (Athens)

27 January 2021 4	Chania	0 − 1	Ergotelis	Chania, Crete, Greece
15:00 EET	Carlito (yellow card) 88'	Report	Peios (yellow card) 21'; Manousakis 56'; Kostanasios (yellow card) 57'	Stadium: Perivolia Municipal Stadium; Attendance: 0 (closed doors); Referee: Angelos Bakoyiannis (Athens)

31 January 2021 5	Karaiskakis	0 − 1	Ergotelis	Arta, Greece
14:45 EET	Papanikou (yellow card) 21'; Dias (yellow card) 69' (yellow-red card) 90'	Report	Servilakis (yellow card) 37'; Patrinos 65'	Stadium: Agioi Anargiroi Municipal Stadium; Attendance: 0 (closed doors); Referee: Pavlos Fragkoulis (Preveza-Lefkada)

6 February 2021 6	Ergotelis	2 − 1	Xanthi	Heraklion, Crete, Greece
14:45 EET	Conraad 19'; Neral (yellow card) 35'; Kostanasios (yellow card) 60'; Bourselis 88', (yellow card) 89'; Servilakis (yellow card) 90+5'	Report	Kevin (yellow card) 17'; Kapnidis (yellow card) 30'; Jurman (yellow card) 48'; Tatos 50'; Papazoglou (yellow card) 90'; Wolters (yellow card) 90+3'	Stadium: Pankritio Stadium; Attendance: 0 (closed doors); Referee: Michalis Matsoukas (Aetoloacarnania)

10 February 2021 7	Trikala	0 − 0	Ergotelis	Trikala, Greece
15:00 EET	Souliotis (yellow card) 62'; Kechagias (yellow card) 68'; Eleftheriadis (yellow card) 84'	Report	Servilakis (yellow card) 29'; Tselios (yellow card) 35' (yellow-red card) 90+2'; Peios (yellow card) 40'	Stadium: Trikala Municipal Stadium; Attendance: 0 (closed doors); Referee: Stefanos-Vaios Kalatzis (Thessaly)

14 February 2021 8	Ergotelis	2 − 0	Diagoras	Heraklion, Crete, Greece
14:45 EET	Boutsakis 5', (yellow card) 20'; Manousakis (yellow card) 55', (goal) 88'; Peios (yellow card) 60'	Report	Karatasios (yellow card) 53'; Kakko (yellow card) 61'	Stadium: Pankritio Stadium; Attendance: 0 (closed doors); Referee: Konstantinos Andrianos (Achaea)

17 February 2021 9	OF Ierapetra	0 − 1	Ergotelis	Ierapetra, Crete, Greece
14:45 EET	Vogiatzis (yellow card) 82'	Report	Boutsakis 5'; Servilakis (yellow card) 13'	Stadium: Petros Vouzounerakis Stadium; Attendance: 0 (closed doors); Referee: Theodoros Poulopoulos (Piraeus)

20 February 2021 10	Ergotelis	1 − 0	Panachaiki	Heraklion, Crete, Greece
14:30 EET	Bourselis 71'	Report		Stadium: Pankritio Stadium; Attendance: 0 (closed doors); Referee: Alexandros Tsamouris (Piraeus)

24 February 2021 2 ^{1}	Doxa Drama	1 − 0	Ergotelis	Drama, Greece
15:00 EET	Mensah 45'; Koukolis (yellow card) 71'	Report	Kostanasios (yellow card) 80'; Tselios (yellow card) 90+3'	Stadium: Doxa Drama Stadium; Attendance: 0 (closed doors); Referee: Mattheos Vournelis (Macedonia)

28 February 2021 11	Ergotelis	1 − 0	Apollon Larissa	Heraklion, Crete, Greece
13:45 EET	Kacurri (yellow card) 10'; Conraad 76'; Kokkinis (yellow card) 76'	Report	Ballas (yellow card) 13' (yellow-red card) 37'; Golias (yellow card) 23'; Shehu (yellow card) 29'; Skoupras (yellow card) 35'; Kamperis (yellow card) 63'	Stadium: Pankritio Stadium; Attendance: 0 (closed doors); Referee: Christos Vergetis (Arcadia)

3 March 2021 12	Ionikos	2 − 3	Ergotelis	Nikaia, Praeus, Greece
17:00 EET	Rolle 2'; Platellas 51'; Omar (yellow card) 74'; Fazos (yellow card) 80'; Vlachomitros (yellow card) 84'	Report	Tselios 12', 71', 81'; Mazoulouxis (yellow card) 89'	Stadium: Neapoli Stadium; Attendance: 0 (closed doors); Referee: Konstantinos Perrakis (Athens)

7 March 2021 13	Ergotelis	6 − 0	Doxa Drama	Heraklion, Crete, Greece
13:30 EET	Tselios 7'; Boutsakis (yellow card) 40'; Conraad 49'; Peios (yellow card) 58'; Manousakis 64'; Patrinos 72', 85'; Bourselis 81'	Report	Belevonis (yellow card) 25'; Mensah (yellow card) 32'	Stadium: Pankritio Stadium; Attendance: 0 (closed doors); Referee: Dimitrios Theocharis (Thessaly)

13 March 2021 14	Levadiakos	1 – 0	Ergotelis	Livadeia, Greece
14:45 EET	Bianconi 26'; Mejía (yellow card) 71'; Mygas (yellow card) 80'; Stojanović (yellow card) 90+1'; Karachalios (yellow card) 90+3'	Report	Manousakis (yellow card) 8'; Servilakis (yellow card) 34'; Batzios (yellow card) 40'	Stadium: Levadia Municipal Stadium; Attendance: 0 (closed doors); Referee: Konstantinos Tsetsilias (Grevena)

17 March 2021 15	Ergotelis	0 – 1	Chania	Heraklion, Crete, Greece
15:00 EET	Peios (yellow card) 54'	Report	Plegas (yellow card) 31'; Anastasopoulos (yellow card) 83'; Macena (yellow card) 90'; Dimitriadis 90+2', (yellow card) 87' (yellow-red card) 90+3'	Stadium: Pankritio Stadium; Attendance: 0 (closed doors); Referee: Aristeidis Vatsios West Attica

21 March 2021 16	Ergotelis	0 – 1	Karaiskakis	Heraklion, Crete, Greece
14:45 EET	Servilakis (yellow card) 30'; Abdullahi (yellow card) 69'; Mazoulouxis (yellow card) 85'	Report	Lovrić (yellow card) 59'; Marathonitis 71'; Klingopoulos (yellow card) 90+4'	Stadium: Pankritio Stadium; Attendance: 0 (closed doors); Referee: Michael Kakafonis (Achaea)

28 March 2021 17	Xanthi	1 − 0	Ergotelis	Pigadia, Xanthi, Greece
14:45 EET	Dimoutsos (yellow card) 40'; Mikeltadze 67', (yellow card) 77' (yellow-red card) 90+5'; Mystakidis (yellow card) 90+6'	Report	Tselios (yellow card) 38'; Kokkinis (yellow card) 50'; Batzios (yellow card) 68'; Pozatzidis (yellow card) 83'	Stadium: Xanthi FC Arena; Attendance: 0 (closed doors); Referee: Alexandros Tsakalidis (Chalkidiki)

4 April 2021 18	Ergotelis	2 − 3	Trikala	Heraklion, Crete, Greece
14:45 EET	Pozatzidis (yellow card) 20'; Manousakis 37', 78' (pen.); Mazoulouxis (yellow card) 79'; Bourselis (yellow card) 90+3'	Report	Papageorgiou (yellow card) 25'; Efthymiou 41', 53', (yellow card) 72'; Eleftheriadis (yellow card) 48'; Rizogiannis 89' (pen.); Stamatis (yellow card) 90+3'	Stadium: Pankritio Stadium; Attendance: 0 (closed doors); Referee: Eleni Antoniou (East Attica)

7 April 2021 19	Diagoras	1 − 1	Ergotelis	Rhodes, Greece
15:30 EET	Kostoulas (yellow card) 16' (yellow-red card) 58'; Koné 53'; Sandravelis (yellow card) 80'	Report	Manousakis 13', (yellow card) 80'; Conraad (yellow card) 59'	Stadium: Diagoras Stadium; Attendance: 0 (closed doors); Referee: Angelos Aggelakis (Macedonia)

11 April 2021 20	Ergotelis	4 – 0	OF Ierapetra	Heraklion, Crete, Greece
14:45 EET	Kostanasios 9'; Manousakis 32'; Bourselis (yellow card) 62'; Pozatzidis (yellow card) 64'; Peios 90+3'; Kokkinis 90+5'	Report	Kapsalis (yellow card) 73'; Masuero (yellow card) 90'	Stadium: Pankritio Stadium; Attendance: 0 (closed doors); Referee: Tsamountantonis (Chios)

18 April 2021 21	Panachaiki	1 − 1	Ergotelis	Agyia, Patras, Greece
14:45 EET	Arvidis 13'; Moustakopoulos (yellow card) 28'; Masouras (yellow card) 61'; Kouskounas (yellow card) 69'	Report	Pozatzidis (yellow card) 10'; Conraad 31'; Kostanasios (yellow card) 61'; Batzios (yellow card) 90+5'	Stadium: Kostas Davourlis Stadium; Attendance: 0 (closed doors); Referee: Konstantinos Kotsanis (Drama)

21 April 2021 22	Apollon Larissa	0 − 3	Ergotelis	Neapoli, Larissa, Greece
15:30 EET	Astras (yellow card) 57'; Ballas (yellow card) 59'	Report	Boutsakis (yellow card) 10'; Conraad 21', 56'; Kola (yellow card) 63'; Peios (yellow card) 64'; Kokkinis 76'	Stadium: Filippoupoli Municipal; Attendance: 0 (closed doors); Referee: Andreas Gkamaris (Athens)

1. Matchday 2 vs. Doxa Drama, originally scheduled for 20 January 2021 was postponed as a result of the Greek Professional Sports Committee not granting Doxa Drama a certificate for participating in the Super League 2.

=== Play-off Round ===
==== League table ====
Pos	Team	Pld	W	D	L	GF	GA	GD	Pts	Promotion or qualification	ION	XAN	LEV	ERG	CHA	DIA
1	Ionikos (C)	27	16	5	6	44	29	+15	53	Promotion to Super League	—	0–2	2–3	2–1	—	—
2	Xanthi (Q)	27	14	9	4	29	12	+17	51	Qualification for the Promotion play-offs	—	—	1–0	0–1	1–1	—
3	Levadiakos	27	14	8	5	42	16	+26	50		—	—	—	0–1	3–0	4–0
4	Ergotelis	27	15	3	9	37	18	+19	48		—	—	—	—	2–0	3–1
5	Chania	27	11	9	7	22	19	+3	42		1–0	—	—	—	—	2–0
6	Diagoras Rodos	27	8	6	13	22	38	−16	30		3–5	0–1	—	—	—	—

Source: sl2fl.gr
Legend: Blue = home team win; Yellow = draw; Red = away team win.
Rules for classification: 1) Points; 2) Head-to-head points (Regular season and play-off); 3) Head-to-head goal difference (Regular season and play-off); 4) Regular season position.
(C) Champions; (Q) Qualified for the phase indicated

==== Results summary ====
Overall								Home						Away					
Pld	W	D	L	GF	GA	GD	Pts	W	D	L	GF	GA	GD	W	D	L	GF	GA	GD
5	4	0	1	8	3	+5	12	2	0	0	5	1	+4	2	0	1	3	2	+1

Last updated: 19 May 2021.
Source: Competitive matches

==== Results by Round ====
Play-offs Μatchday	1	2	3	4	5
Ground	H	A	H	A	A
Result	W	W	W	W	L
Position	4	4	4	3	4

Updated to match(es) played on 19 May 2021. Source: footballleaguenews.gr
A = Away; H = Home; W = Win; D = Draw; L = Loss

==== Matches ====
28 April 2021 1	Ergotelis	3 − 1	Diagoras	Heraklion, Crete, Greece
15:30 EEST	Kokkinis 4', (yellow card) 50'; Manousakis 82'; Conraad 87' (pen.); Mazoulouxis (yellow card) 90+3'	Report	Bastakos 23'; Dimitroulas (yellow card) 73'	Stadium: Pankritio Stadium; Attendance: 0 (closed doors); Referee: Alexandros Tsakalidis (Chalkidiki)

5 May 2021 2	Levadiakos	0 − 1	Ergotelis	Livadeia, Greece
15:30 EEST	Liagas (yellow card) 43'; Kosti (yellow card) 79'; Mygas (yellow card) 87'	Report	Batzios (yellow card) 43'; Manousakis 74' (pen.)	Stadium: Levadia Municipal Stadium; Attendance: 0 (closed doors); Referee: Anastasios Papapetrou (Athens)

9 May 2021 3	Ergotelis	2 − 0	Chania	Heraklion, Crete, Greece
14:45 EEST	Kola 42'; Manousakis 48'; Bourselis (yellow card) 85'; Kostanasios (yellow card) 90'	Report	Kassos (yellow card) 35'; Plegas (yellow card) 51'; Koutzavasilis (yellow card) 76'; Anastasopoulos (yellow card) 78'	Stadium: Pankritio Stadium; Attendance: 0 (closed doors); Referee: Angelos Aggelakis (Macedonia)

16 May 2021 4	Xanthi	0 − 1	Ergotelis	Pigadia, Xanthi, Greece
14:45 EEST	Dimoutsos (yellow card) 66'; Siatravanis (yellow card) 78'; Tatos (yellow card) 90+2'	Report	Tselios 46'; Kokkinis (yellow card) 82'; Kostanasios (yellow card) 84'; Peios (yellow card) 90'; Bourselis (yellow card) 90+3'	Stadium: Xanthi FC Arena; Attendance: 0 (closed doors); Referee: Ioannis Papadopoulos (Macedonia)

19 May 2021 5	Ionikos	2 − 1	Ergotelis	Nikaia, Praeus, Greece
15:30 EEST	Papageorgiou (yellow card) 17'; Mumin (yellow card) 28', (goal) 74'; Manalis 81', (yellow card) 82'; Castro (yellow card) 90'	Report	Tselios (yellow card) 45+1' (yellow-red card) 73'; Kokkinis 60'; Peios (yellow card) 88' (yellow-red card) 90+3'	Stadium: Neapoli Stadium; Attendance: 0 (closed doors); Referee: Vasilios Fotias (Pella)

== Statistics ==
=== Squad statistics ===
As of 19 May 2021

Appearances denote players in the starting lineup, with the numbers in parentheses denoting appearances as substitute.

No.	Name	Super League 2		Greek Cup		Total	
No.	Name	Apps	Goals	Apps	Goals	Apps	Goals
Goalkeepers
1	(Greece) Dimitrios Katsimitros	27	0	0	0	27	0
40	(Greece) Giorgos Tzelepis	0	0	0	0	0	0
75	(Greece) Nikos Psimopoulos	0	0	0	0	0	0
Defenders
2	(Netherlands) Jeffrey Neral	9	0	0	0	9	0
5	(Greece) Christos Batzios	26	0	0	0	26	0
8	(Greece) Kyriakos Mazoulouxis	27	0	0	0	27	0
14	(Greece) Nikos Peios	24	1	0	0	24	1
18	(Greece) Georgios Servilakis	16 (7)	0	0	0	16 (7)	0
24	(Greece) Stelios Pozatzidis	11 (6)	0	0	0	11 (6)	0
26	(Greece) Paris Doumanis	1 (2)	0	0	0	1 (2)	0
33	(Greece) Giannis Theodorakis	0	0	0	0	0	0
77	(Brazil) Arthur Bote	3 (4)	0	0	0	3 (4)	0
80	(Albania) Edison Kola	5 (3)	1	0	0	5 (3)	1
89	(Greece) Georgios Sarris	0 (2)	0	0	0	0 (2)	0
Midfielders
10	(Greece) Antonis Bourselis	13 (11)	3	0	0	13 (11)	3
17	(Albania) Oresti Kacurri	11 (10)	0	0	0	11 (10)	0
20	(Greece) Antonis Alexakis	0 (3)	0	0	0	0 (3)	0
22	(Somalia) Abdulsamed Abdullahi	16 (6)	0	0	0	16 (6)	0
23	(Greece) Giannis Boutsakis	16 (10)	2	0	0	16 (10)	2
38	(Greece) Ilias Tselios	25 (1)	5	0	0	25 (1)	5
Forwards
7	(Greece) Giorgos Manousakis	25 (2)	10	0	0	25 (2)	10
9	(Greece) Themis Patrinos	6 (14)	3	0	0	6 (14)	3
11	(Netherlands) Tyrone Conraad	18 (9)	7	0	0	18 (9)	7
21	(Greece) Thanasis Kostanasios	16 (7)	1	0	0	16 (7)	1
27	(Belgium) Charles Kwateng	2 (8)	0	0	0	2 (8)	0
28	(Greece) Sotirios Kokkinis	6 (10)	4	0	0	6 (10)	4
	(Greece) Stathis Kapouranis	0	0	0	0	0	0
Players transferred/loaned out during the season
6	(Greece) Giannis Koutantos	0	0	0	0	0	0

=== Goal scorers ===
Player has departed in mid-season

No.	Pos.	Nation	Name	Super League 2	Total
7	FW	(Greece)	Giorgos Manousakis	10	10
11	FW	(Netherlands)	Tyrone Conraad	7	7
38	MF	(Greece)	Ilias Tselios	5	5
28	FW	(Greece)	Sotirios Kokkinis	4	4
10	MF	(Greece)	Antonis Bourselis	3	3
9	FW	(Greece)	Themis Patrinos	3	3
23	MF	(Greece)	Giannis Boutsakis	2	2
21	FW	(Greece)	Thanasis Kostanasios	1	1
14	DF	(Greece)	Nikos Peios	1	1
80	DF	(Albania) (Greece)	Edison Kola	1	1
TOTAL				37	37

Last updated: 19 May 2021
Source: Competitive matches

=== Disciplinary record ===
S	P	N	Name	Super League 2			Total		
S	P	N	Name	Yellow card	Yellow-red card	Red card	Yellow card	Yellow-red card	Red card
38	FW	(Greece)	Ilias Tselios	2	2	0	2	2	0
14	DF	(Greece)	Nikos Peios	9	1	0	9	1	0
18	DF	(Greece)	Georgios Servilakis	7	0	0	7	0	0
5	DF	(Greece)	Christos Batzios	5	0	0	5	0	0
21	FW	(Greece)	Thanasis Kostanasios	6	0	0	6	0	0
10	MF	(Greece)	Antonis Bourselis	5	0	0	5	0	0
7	FW	(Greece)	Giorgos Manousakis	4	0	0	4	0	0
24	DF	(Greece)	Stelios Pozatzidis	4	0	0	4	0	0
8	DF	(Greece)	Kyriakos Mazoulouxis	4	0	0	4	0	0
28	FW	(Greece)	Sotirios Kokkinis	4	0	0	4	0	0
22	MF	(Somalia)	Abdulsamed Abdullahi	3	0	0	3	0	0
23	MF	(Greece)	Giannis Boutsakis	3	0	0	3	0	0
11	FW	(Netherlands)	Tyrone Conraad	2	0	0	2	0	0
2	DF	(Netherlands)	Jeffrey Neral	1	0	0	1	0	0
17	MF	(Albania)	Oresti Kacurri	1	0	0	1	0	0
80	DF	(Albania)	Edison Kola	1	0	0	1	0	0
TOTALS				58	3	0	58	3	0

Last updated: 19 May 2021
Source: Competitive matches
Ordered by (red card) , (yellow card) (yellow-red card) and (yellow card)
(yellow card) = Number of bookings; (yellow card) (yellow-red card) = Number of sending offs after a second yellow card; (red card) = Number of sending offs by a direct red card.

=== Injury record ===
N	P	Nat.	Name	Type	Status	Source	Match	Inj. Date	Ret. Date
27	FW	(Belgium)	Charles Kwateng	Patellar tendon rupture of the right foot		www.ergotelisfc.gr	vs Chania	24 December 2019	18 September 2020
8	DF	(Greece)	Kyriakos Mazoulouxis	Torn meniscus		www.ergotelisfc.gr	Training	7 August 2019	31 August 2020
2	DF	(Netherlands)	Jeffrey Neral	Muscle strain		www.ergotelisfc.gr	vs Karaiskakis	21 March 2021	April–May 2021
22	MF	(Somalia)	Abdulsamed Abdullahi	Muscle strain		www.ergotelisfc.gr	vs Diagoras (warm-up)	7 April 2021	21 April 2021
77	DF	(Brazil)	Arthur Bote	Muscle strain		www.ergotelisfc.gr	vs OF Ierapetrea	11 April 2021	April–May 2021

- Player is injured
- Player has recovered from injury
Last updated: 11 April 2021
Source: Ergotelis FC
