= Kristian Kushta =

Albanian–Greek association football player (born 1997)

Personal information
- Date of birth: 16 December 1997 (age 28)
- Place of birth: Elbasan, Albania
- Height: 1.92 m (6 ft 3 1/2 in)
- Position: Forward

Team information
- Current team: Iraklis
- Number: 9

Youth career
- 2003–2015: PAOK

Senior career*
Years	Team	Apps	(Gls)
2015–2019	PAOK	1	(0)
2016–2017	→ Zemplín Michalovce (loan)	27	(3)
2017	→ Slavoj Trebišov (loan)	6	(0)
2018–2019	→ Aiginiakos (loan)	30	(4)
2019–2020	Karaiskakis Arta	15	(3)
2020–2021	Ierapetra	25	(5)
2021–2023	AEL	15	(3)
2023–	Iraklis	88	(22)

International career^{‡}
2013	Albania U17	3	(0)
- * Club domestic league appearances and goals as of September 12, 2026 ‡ National team caps and goals as of March 16, 2025

Kristian Kushta (born 16 December 1997) is an Albanian–Greek professional association football player who plays as a forward for Super League Greece club Iraklis.

== Club career ==
=== Early career ===
Kushta was born in Albania but moved to Greece when he was very young and started his youth career with P.A.O.K. aged five.

=== P.A.O.K. ===
He made it his professional debut under the coach Igor Tudor on 17 December 2015 in a 2015–16 Greek Football Cup match against Olympiacos Volos coming on as a substitute in the 46th minute in place of Nikos Syrakos, where the match finished in the 1–1 away draw.

== International career ==
Kushta participated with Albania national under-17 football team in the 2014 UEFA European Under-17 Championship qualifying round in October 2013 under the coach Džemal Mustedanagić where he managed to appear in all 3 group matches, playing as a substitute in the opening match against Romania U17 replacing Franc Bakalli, then two other matches as a starter to help his side to advance in the next elite round.

== Personal life ==
His uncle is the retired association football player Sokol Kushta.

== Career statistics ==
As of 18 August 2026

Club	Season	League			Cup		Continental		Other		Total	
Club	Season	Division	Apps	Goals	Apps	Goals	Apps	Goals	Apps	Goals	Apps	Goals
PAOK	2015–16	Superleague Greece	1	0	1	0	—		—		2	0
Michalovce (loan)	2016–17	Fortuna Liga	24	3	6	6	—		—		30	9
Michalovce (loan)	2017–18	Fortuna Liga	3	0	1	0	—		—		4	0
Michalovce (loan)	Total		27	3	7	6	—		—		34	9
Slavoj Trebišov (loan)	2017–18	2. Liga	6	0	0	0	—		—		6	0
Aiginiakos (loan)	2017–18	Superleague Greece 2	9	1	0	0	—		—		9	1
Aiginiakos (loan)	2018–19	Superleague Greece 2	21	3	0	0	—		—		21	3
Aiginiakos (loan)	Total		30	4	0	0	—		—		30	4
Karaiskakis	2019–20	Superleague Greece 2	15	3	1	0	—		—		16	3
Ierapetra	2020–21	Superleague Greece 2	25	5	0	0	—		—		25	5
AEL	2021–22	Superleague Greece 2	8	2	4	1	—		—		12	3
AEL	2022–23	Superleague Greece 2	7	1	0	0	—		—		7	1
AEL	Total		15	3	4	1	—		—		19	4
Iraklis	2022–23	Superleague Greece 2	14	1	0	0	—		—		14	1
Iraklis	2023–24	Superleague Greece 2	29	9	1	1	—		—		30	10
Iraklis	2024–25	Superleague Greece 2	25	8	2	0	—		—		27	8
Iraklis	2025–26	Superleague Greece 2	17	4	2	1	—		—		19	5
Iraklis	2026–27	Superleague Greece	0	0	1	1	—		—		1	1
Iraklis	Total		85	22	6	3	—		—		91	25
Career total			204	40	19	10	0	0	0	0	223	50
