= List of Greek football transfers winter 2022–23 =

This is a list of Greek football transfers winter 2022–23.

== Greek Super League ==
=== AEK Athens ===
In:

No.	Pos.	Nation	Player
—	MF	ESP	Paolo Fernandes (End of Loan Volos)
—	DF	SVN	Žiga Laci (End of Loan (Slovenia) Koper)
—	MF	GRE	Giannis Fivos Botos (Loan return from (Moldova) Sheriff Tiraspol)

Out:

No.	Pos.	Nation	Player
—	GK	GRE	Panagiotis Tsintotas (to PAS Giannina)
—	MF	GRE	Giannis Fivos Botos (to AEK Athens B)
—	MF	GRE	Christos Albanis (to (Spain) Andorra)

=== Aris Thessaloniki ===
In:

No.	Pos.	Nation	Player
—	MF	CZE	Vladimír Darida (from (Germany) Hertha BSC)
—	FW	MTN	Aboubakar Kamara (On loan from Olympiacos)
—	MF	GRE	Lazaros Christodoulopoulos (From (Cyprus) Anorthosis)

Out:

No.	Pos.	Nation	Player
—	MF	HON	Edwin Rodríguez (Loan return to (Honduras) Olimpia)
—	MF	SEN	Pape Cheikh Diop (Released)
—	MF	ARG	Daniel Mancini (to Panathinaikos)

=== Asteras Tripolis ===
In:

No.	Pos.	Nation	Player

Out:

No.	Pos.	Nation	Player
42	DF	GRE	Georgios Antzoulas (to (Hungary) Újpest)

=== Atromitos ===
In:

No.	Pos.	Nation	Player
—	MF	GRE	Marios Zounis (loan return from Chania)
—	MF	GUI	Aguibou Camara (on loan from Olympiacos)

Out:

No.	Pos.	Nation	Player
—	DF	GRE	Stavros Vasilantonopoulos (to Lamia)
—	MF	GRE	Alexandros Kartalis (to Volos)
—	FW	ESP	Juan Muñiz (to (Malaysia) Johor Darul Ta'zim)

=== Ionikos ===
In:

No.	Pos.	Nation	Player
29	DF	ALG	Rachid Bouhenna (from (Romania) FCSB)
—	FW	ENG	Kaiyne Woolery (from (Turkey) Sakaryaspor)

Out:

No.	Pos.	Nation	Player
33	MF	ARG	Javier Mendoza (to (Cyprus) AEL Limassol)

=== Lamia ===
In:

No.	Pos.	Nation	Player
—	DF	FRA	Leroy Abanda (on loan from (Belgium) Seraing)
—	DF	BLR	Aleksandr Pavlovets (on loan from (Russia) Orenburg)
—	DF	GRE	Kyriakos Papadopoulos (from (Poland) FC U Craiova)
—	MF	ESP	Rubén Martínez (from (Spain) Albacete)
—	DF	GRE	Stavros Vasilantonopoulos (from Atromitos)
—	MF	SRB	Zoran Tošić (from (Kazakhstan) Tobol)
—	FW	GRE	Nikos Vergos (on loan from (Austria) Wolfsberger AC)

Out:

No.	Pos.	Nation	Player
—	FW	BRA	Gustavo Marmentini (on loan to (Israel) Maccabi Bnei Reineh)
—	FW	GRE	Petros Giakoumakis (on loan to (Cyprus) Olympiakos Nicosia)

=== Levadiakos ===
In:

No.	Pos.	Nation	Player
—	GK	GRE	Giannis Angelopoulos
—	MF	SWE	Filip Sachpekidis (from (Sweden) Kalmar)
—	MF	FRA	Abdoulaye Dabo (on loan from Olympiacos B)
—	FW	SWE	Alexander Jeremejeff (loan from Panathinaikos)

Out:

No.	Pos.	Nation	Player
—	GK	POL	Grzegorz Sandomierski (Released)
—	FW	BRA	Régis (Released)

=== OFI ===
In:

No.	Pos.	Nation	Player
—	MF	COL	Santiago Mosquera (from (Mexico) Pachuca)
—	FW	DEN	Sebastian Grønning (from (Denmark) AGF)

Out:

No.	Pos.	Nation	Player
—	MF	GRE	Giannis Bouzoukis (to Panetolikos)
—	FW	ESP	Miguel Ángel Guerrero (to (Cyprus) Anorthosis)
—	FW	GRE	Fiorin Durmishaj (on loan to (Cyprus) Olympiakos Nicosia)

=== Olympiacos ===
In:

No.	Pos.	Nation	Player
—	DF	BRA	Rodinei (to (Brazil) Flamengo)
—	DF	GRE	Petros Bagalianis (Loan return from PAS Giannina)
—	MF	GRE	Vasilios Sourlis (loan return from (Netherlands) Fortuna Sittard)
—	DF	BRA	Ramon (from (Brazil) Flamengo)
—	MF	KOS	Zymer Bytyqi (from (Turkey) Konyaspor)

Out:

No.	Pos.	Nation	Player
—	DF	BRA	Marcelo (Released)
16	DF	ISR	Doron Leidner (on loan to Austria Wien)
—	DF	FRA	Kenny Lala (to (France) Brest)
—	DF	CRO	Šime Vrsaljko (Released)
—	DF	GRE	Leonardo Koutris (to (Poland) Pogoń Szczecin)
—	MF	ENG	Josh Bowler (Loan return (England) Nottingham Forest)
—	MF	USA	Konrad de la Fuente (Loan return (France) Marseille)
—	MF	ESP	Gonzalo Ávila (to (Bulgaria) Ludogorets Razgrad)
—	MF	GRE	Andreas Bouchalakis (to (Turkey) Konyaspor)
—	MF	GUI	Aguibou Camara (on loan to Atromitos)
—	MF	POR	Pêpê (on loan to (Spain) Cartagena)
—	FW	KOR	Hwang Ui-jo (Loan return (England) Nottingham Forest)
—	FW	FRA	Aboubakar Kamara (On loan to Aris)

=== Panathinaikos ===
In:

No.	Pos.	Nation	Player
—	DF	POL	Tymoteusz Puchacz (from (Germany) Union Berlin)
—	MF	HUN	László Kleinheisler (from (Croatia) Osijek)
—	MF	ARG	Daniel Mancini (from Aris Thessaloniki)
—	FW	SWE	Alexander Jeremejeff (from (Sweden) BK Häcken)

Out:

No.	Pos.	Nation	Player
—	GK	GRE	Sokratis Dioudis (to (Poland) Zagłębie Lubin)
—	FW	SWE	Alexander Jeremejeff (loan to Levadiakos)

=== Panetolikos ===
In:

No.	Pos.	Nation	Player
—	MF	GRE	Giannis Bouzoukis (from OFI)
—	DF	SRB	Nikola Stajić (from (Serbia) Radnički Niš)

Out:

No.	Pos.	Nation	Player
20	MF	HON	Deiby Flores (to (Hungary) Fehérvár)

=== PAOK ===
In:

No.	Pos.	Nation	Player
—	MF	BRA	Taison (from (Brazil) Internacional)
—	MF	MAR	Hicham Kanis (from Panserraikos)
—	MF	POL	Tomasz Kędziora (on loan from (Ukraine) Dynamo Kyiv)
—	FW	GRE	Georgios Koutsias (on loan from Volos)

Out:

No.	Pos.	Nation	Player
—	MF	BRA	Léo Jabá (to (Brazil) São Bernardo)
—	MF	MAR	Hicham Kanis (on loan to Panserraikos)
—	FW	GRE	Georgios Koutsias (to (United States) Chicago Fire)

=== PAS Giannina ===
In:

No.	Pos.	Nation	Player
—	GK	GRE	Thomas Vrakas (from PAS Giannina U19)
—	GK	GRE	Panagiotis Tsintotas (from AEK Athens)
—	DF	ROU	Andrei Radu (from (Romania) Dinamo București)
—	DF	URU	Geronimo Bortagaray (from (Uruguay) Montevideo Wanderers)
—	MF	GRE	Sotiris Ninis (from Volos)
—	MF	URU	Federico Gino (from (Uruguay) Platense)

Out:

No.	Pos.	Nation	Player
—	GK	FRA	Jérôme Prior (to (France) Pau)
—	DF	GRE	Petros Bagalianis (Loan return to Olympiacos)
—	DF	GER	Louis Poznański (to (Poland) Lechia Gdańsk)
—	DF	GRE	Dimitrios Karagiannis (to Diagoras)

=== Volos ===
In:

No.	Pos.	Nation	Player
—	DF	FRA	Harouna Sy (from (France) Amiens B)
—	MF	ARG	Enzo Gaggi (from (Argentina) Chaco For Ever)
—	MF	GRE	Alexandros Kartalis (from Atromitos)
—	MF	HON	Michaell Chirinos (from (Honduras) Olimpia)

Out:

No.	Pos.	Nation	Player
—	MF	ESP	Paolo Fernandes (End of Loan AEK Athens)
—	FW	ESP	Victor Fernández (to (Cyprus) Enosis Neon Paralimni)

== Super League Greece 2 ==
=== AEK Athens B ===
In:

No.	Pos.	Nation	Player
—	MF	GRE	Giannis Fivos Botos (from AEK Athens)

Out:

No.	Pos.	Nation	Player

=== AEL Larissa ===
In:

No.	Pos.	Nation	Player
—	DF	ALB	Edison Kola (from Ierapetra)

Out:

No.	Pos.	Nation	Player

=== Apollon Pontus F.C. ===
In:

No.	Pos.	Nation	Player
77	FW	CMR	Donaldoni Nguemechieu (FROM (Cyprus) AEL Limassol)

Out:

No.	Pos.	Nation	Player
—	MF	FRA	Pathy Malumandsoko (to (Ukraine) Metalist Kharkiv)

=== Anagennisi Karditsa F.C. ===
In:

No.	Pos.	Nation	Player

Out:

No.	Pos.	Nation	Player
—	MF	BUL	Momchil Tsvetanov (to (Bulgaria) Botev Vratsa)

=== Apollon Smyrnis ===
In:

No.	Pos.	Nation	Player
—	FW	GHA	Sadat Karim (from (Sweden) Halmstads BK)

Out:

No.	Pos.	Nation	Player

=== Chania FC ===
In:

No.	Pos.	Nation	Player
—	MF	RUS	Valentin Zekhov (from (Latvia) Spartaks Jūrmala)
—	MF	GRE	Giannis Iatroudis (from Kifisia)

Out:

No.	Pos.	Nation	Player
—	MF	ARG	Brian Ganchier (Released)
—	MF	GRE	Marios Zounis (loan return to Atromitos)
—	MF	GRE	Lampros Politis (Released)
—	MF	GRE	Stratos Chintzidis (Released)

=== Diagoras ===
In:

No.	Pos.	Nation	Player
—	DF	GRE	Dimitrios Karagiannis (from PAS Giannina)

Out:

No.	Pos.	Nation	Player

=== Egaleo F.C. ===
In:

No.	Pos.	Nation	Player
—	MF	ARG	Cristian Ramírez (from (Slovenia) AS Trenčín)

Out:

No.	Pos.	Nation	Player

=== Ierapetra ===
In:

No.	Pos.	Nation	Player

Out:

No.	Pos.	Nation	Player
—	MF	ALB	Edison Kola (to AEL Larissa)

=== Irodotos FC ===
In:

No.	Pos.	Nation	Player
—	GK	CYP	Neofytos Stylianou (from (Cyprus) AEL Limassol)
—	MF	SRB	Andrija Fratrović (from (Serbia) Čukarički)

Out:

No.	Pos.	Nation	Player

=== Olympiacos B ===
In:

No.	Pos.	Nation	Player
70	MF	GRE	Dimitrios Pinakas (loan return from (Cyprus) Apollon Limassol)

Out:

No.	Pos.	Nation	Player
—	DF	FRA	Étienne Youte Kinkoue (to (France) Le Havre)
—	MF	FRA	Abdoulaye Dabo (on loan to Levadiakos)

=== Panathinaikos B ===
In:

No.	Pos.	Nation	Player

Out:

No.	Pos.	Nation	Player
—	MF	CAN	Ilias Iliadis (to (United States) CF Montréal)

=== Panserraikos F.C. ===
In:

No.	Pos.	Nation	Player
—	FW	NGA	Sudais Ali Baba (from (Slovenia) Spartak Trnava)

Out:

No.	Pos.	Nation	Player
