= Orestis Katsourri =

Greek footballer (born 1998)

Personal information
- Date of birth: 25 February 1998 (age 28)
- Place of birth: Heraklion, Crete, Greece
- Height: 1.71 m (5 ft 7 in)
- Position: Midfielder

Team information
- Current team: Giouchtas

Youth career
- –2018: Ergotelis

Senior career*
Years	Team	Apps	(Gls)
2018–2022	Ergotelis	60	(0)
2022–2024	Chania	19	(0)
2024–2025	Kavala	10	(0)
2022–2024	A.E. Kifisia	1	(0)
2025–	Giouchtas		
- * Club domestic league appearances and goals as of 3 July 2024

Orestis Katsourri (Greek: Ορέστης Κατσούρρι; Albanian: Oresti Kacurri; born 25 February 1998) is a Greek-Albanian professional footballer who plays as a midfielder for Gamma Ethniki club Giouchtas.

== Career statistics ==
=== Club ===
As of 26 September 2021

Club	Season	League			Cup		Europe		Total	
Club	Season	Division	Apps	Goals	Apps	Goals	Apps	Goals	Apps	Goals
Ergotelis	2018–19	Football League	8	0	2	0	–		10	0
Ergotelis	2019–20	Super League 2	7	0	1	0	–		8	0
Ergotelis	2020–21	Super League 2	21	0	–		–		21	0
Ergotelis	2021–22	Super League 2	0	0	1	0	–		1	0
Ergotelis	Total		36	0	4	0	0	0	40	0
