= Giannis Boutsakis =

Greek footballer (born 1994)

Personal information
- Full name: Ioannis Boutsakis
- Date of birth: 8 February 1994 (age 32)
- Place of birth: Heraklion, Crete, Greece
- Position: Midfielder

Team information
- Current team: Atsalenions

Youth career
- 2001–2012: Atsalenios

Senior career*
Years	Team	Apps	(Gls)
2012–2017	Atsalenios		
2017–2022	Ergotelis	115	(5)
2022–2023	Chania	23	(1)
2023–2024	Giouchtas	27	(1)
2024–	Atsalenios		
- * Club domestic league appearances and goals as of 22 May 2024

Giannis Boutsakis (Greek: Γιάννης Μπουτσάκης; born 8 February 1994) is a Greek professional footballer who plays as a midfielder for Gamma Ethniki club Atsalenios.

== Career ==
=== Atsalenios ===
Born in Heraklion, Boutsakis began playing football at the age of 7, when his parents signed him up at the infrastructure segments of local club Atsalenios. He was promoted to the senior squad in 2012, and stayed with the club until the summer of 2017, when he was transferred to Second Division club Ergotelis.

=== Ergotelis ===
Boutsakis made his professional debut for Ergotelis as a starter in the club's first match of the season during a 2−0 Cup loss against Panserraikos on 18 September 2017. He kept his place as a regular starter throughout the duration of the season, and was called up by the club's administration to sign a new three-year contract in June 2018.

== Career statistics ==
As of matches played September 26, 2021

Club	Season	League			Cup		Continental		Other		Total	
Club	Season	Division	Apps	Goals	Apps	Goals	Apps	Goals	Apps	Goals	Apps	Goals
Ergotelis	2017–18	Football League	29	0	2	0	—		—		31	0
Ergotelis	2018–19	Football League	26	1	6	1	—		—		32	2
Ergotelis	2019–20	Superleague 2	16	2	2	0	—		—		18	2
Ergotelis	2020–21	Superleague 2	26	2	—		—		—		26	2
Ergotelis	2021–22	Superleague 2	0	0	1	0	—		—		1	0
Total			97	5	11	1	—		—		108	6
Career total			97	5	11	1	—		—		108	6

== Personal life ==
In 2018, Boutsakis obtained a degree from the Department of Preschool Education of the University of Crete, for which he received an honorary award during the 2018 Greek football PSAP awards.
