= Nikos Peios =

Greek footballer

Personal information
- Full name: Nikolaos Peios
- Date of birth: 17 June 1999 (age 27)
- Place of birth: Veria, Greece
- Height: 1.83 m (6 ft 0 in)
- Position: Centre-back

Team information
- Current team: Panthrakikos
- Number: 5

Youth career
- 2011–2015: Naoussa
- 2015–2019: Olympiacos

Senior career*
Years	Team	Apps	(Gls)
2019–2022	Ergotelis	62	(2)
2022–2024	A.E. Kifisia	38	(3)
2024	→ Chania (loan)	6	(0)
2025–2026	Panionios	9	(0)
2026–	Panthrakikos	0	(0)
- * Club domestic league appearances and goals as of 25 January 2026

Nikos Peios (Greek: Νίκος Πέιος; born 17 June 1999) is a Greek professional footballer who plays as a midfielder for Super League 2 club Panthrakikos.

== Career statistics ==
=== Club ===
As of 19 May 2021

Club	Season	League			Cup		Europe		Total	
Club	Season	Division	Apps	Goals	Apps	Goals	Apps	Goals	Apps	Goals
Ergotelis	2019–20	Super League Greece 2	11	0	2	0	–		13	0
Ergotelis	2020–21	Super League Greece 2	24	1	–		–		24	1
Ergotelis	Total		35	1	2	0	0	0	37	1
