= Manolis Fazos =

Greek footballer

Personal information
- Full name: Emmanouil Fazos
- Date of birth: 12 August 1995 (age 31)
- Place of birth: Greece
- Height: 1.87 m (6 ft 2 in)
- Position: Centre-back

Team information
- Current team: Giouchtas
- Number: 33

Youth career
- 2009–2013: OFI

Senior career*
Years	Team	Apps	(Gls)
2013–2019	OFI	37	(0)
2018–2019	→ AO Chania−Kissamikos (loan)	20	(0)
2019–2020	Olympiacos Volos	17	(3)
2020–2021	Ionikos	15	(0)
2021–2022	Xanthi	17	(1)
2022–2023	Proodeftiki	19	(0)
2023–	Giouchtas	13	(0)

International career^{‡}
2014	Greece U19	2	(0)
- * Club domestic league appearances and goals as of 16 May 2024 ‡ National team caps and goals as of 2 June 2014

Manolis Fazos (Greek: Μανώλης Φαζός; born 12 August 1995) is a Greek professional footballer who plays as a centre-back for Super League 2 club Giouchtas.

== Honours ==
OFI

- Gamma Ethniki: 2015–16
- Football League: 2017–18

Ionikos

- Super League 2: 2020–21
