= Nikos Kechagias =

Nikos Kechagias may refer to:

- Nikos Kechagias (footballer, born 2000)
- Nikos Kechagias (footballer, born 1969)
