= Rafail Soilemezoglou =

Greek footballer

Personal information
- Full name: Rafail Savvas Soilemezoglou
- Date of birth: 13 March 1996 (age 30)
- Place of birth: Frankfurt, Germany
- Height: 1.80 m (5 ft 11 in)
- Position: Goalkeeper

Team information
- Current team: Karaiskakis
- Number: 1

Youth career
- 2001–2006: SC Korb
- 2006–2015: PAOK

Senior career*
Years	Team	Apps	(Gls)
2015–2017	PAOK	0	(0)
2016–2017	→ Pierikos (loan)	24	(0)
2017–2018	Veria	0	(0)
2018–2019	Edessaikos	24	(0)
2019–2020	Panserraikos	10	(0)
2020–	Karaiskakis	7	(0)

International career^{‡}
2013	Greece U17	1	(0)
- * Club domestic league appearances and goals as of 29 December 2021 ‡ National team caps and goals as of 27 February 2013

Rafail Soilemezoglou (Greek: Ραφαήλ Σοϊλεμέζογλου; born 13 March 1996) is a Greek professional footballer who plays as a goalkeeper for Super League 2 club Karaiskakis.
