= Georgios Mygas =

Greek footballer (born 1994)

Personal information
- Date of birth: 7 April 1994 (age 32)
- Place of birth: Amfilochia, Greece
- Height: 1.85 m (6 ft 1 in)
- Position: Right-back

Team information
- Current team: Volos
- Number: 22

Youth career
- Panetolikos

Senior career*
Years	Team	Apps	(Gls)
2012–2019	Panetolikos	110	(0)
2019	Zagłębie Sosnowiec	15	(2)
2020–2021	Levadiakos	28	(2)
2021–2023	Ionikos	57	(1)
2023–	Volos	88	(0)

International career
2013	Greece U19	6	(0)
2015–2016	Greece U21	6	(0)
- * Club domestic league appearances and goals as of 20 September 2026

Georgios Mygas (Greek: Γεώργιος Μύγας; born 7 April 1994) is a Greek professional footballer who plays as a right-back for Super League club Volos.

== Career ==
Mygas began his career with the youth club of Panetolikos. He made his first-team debut on 29 September 2012, playing against AEL Kalloni for the 2012–13 Greek Football League.

On 27 May 2016, Panetolikos extended the player's contract which expired in the summer of 2017.

On 7 January 2019, Zagłębie Sosnowiec announced the signing for a six months' period of the Greek defender, as club's coach Valdas Ivanauskas cited his strengths to be good intercepting, effective one-on-one game, speed, movement, precise crossing and offensive qualities.

On 26 June 2021, Ionikos officially announced the signing of the Greek defender on a free transfer.

On 13 June 2023, he joined Volos on a free transfer.

== Career statistics ==
As of 7 April 2024

Appearances and goals by club, season and competition
Club	Season	League			National cup (Note: Includes Greek Cup)		Europe		Other		Total	
Club	Season	Division	Apps	Goals	Apps	Goals	Apps	Goals	Apps	Goals	Apps	Goals
Panetolikos	2012–13	Football League	18	0	1	0	—		—		19	0
Panetolikos	2013–14	Superleague Greece	11	0	1	0	—		—		12	0
Panetolikos	2014–15	Superleague Greece	19	0	2	0	—		—		21	0
Panetolikos	2015–16	Superleague Greece	19	0	1	0	—		—		20	0
Panetolikos	2016–17	Superleague Greece	21	0	4	0	—		—		25	0
Panetolikos	2017–18	Superleague Greece	11	0	2	0	—		—		13	0
Panetolikos	2018–19	Superleague Greece	0	0	0	0	—		—		0	0
Panetolikos	Total		99	0	11	0	—		—		110	0
Zagłębie Sosnowiec	2018–19	Ekstraklasa	15	2	—		—		—		19	0
Levadiakos	2019–20	Superleague Greece 2	4	0	—		—		—		4	0
Levadiakos	2020–21	Superleague Greece 2	24	2	0	0	—		—		24	2
Levadiakos	Total		28	2	0	0	—		—		28	2
Ionikos	2021–22	Superleague Greece	28	1	2	0	—		—		30	1
Ionikos	2022–23	Superleague Greece	29	0	0	0	—		—		29	0
Ionikos	Total		57	1	2	0	—		—		59	1
Volos	2023–24	Superleague Greece	19	0	0	0	—		—		19	0
Career total			218	5	13	0	0	0	0	0	231	5
