= Manolis Smyrlakis =

Greek footballer

Personal information
- Full name: Emmanouil Smyrlakis
- Date of birth: 11 June 1999 (age 27)
- Place of birth: Thessaloniki, Greece
- Height: 1.87 m (6 ft 2 in)
- Position: Defensive midfielder

Youth career
- Platanias

Senior career*
Years	Team	Apps	(Gls)
2018–2020	Platanias	13	(0)
2020–2021	O.F. Ierapetra		
- * Club domestic league appearances and goals as of 29 February 2020

Manolis Smyrlakis (Greek: Μανώλης Σμυρλάκης; born 11 June 1999) is a Greek professional footballer who plays as a defensive midfielder.
