= Vasilakakis =

Vasilakakis (Greek: Βασιλακάκης) is a Greek surname. Notable people with the surname include:

- Kostas Vasilakakis (born 1957), Greek footballer and manager
- Theodoros Vasilakakis (born 1988), Greek footballer
