= Panagiotis Liagas =

Greek footballer

Personal information
- Date of birth: 5 November 1999 (age 27)
- Place of birth: Karpenisi, Greece
- Height: 1.89 m (6 ft 2 in)
- Position: Centre-back

Team information
- Current team: Levadiakos
- Number: 24

Youth career
- 2016–2018: Levadiakos

Senior career*
Years	Team	Apps	(Gls)
2018–	Levadiakos	179	(8)

International career^{‡}
2019	Greece U21	2	(0)
- * Club domestic league appearances and goals as of 20 September 2026 ‡ National team caps and goals as of 6 June 2019

Panagiotis Liagas (Greek: Παναγιώτης Λιάγκας; born 5 November 1999) is a Greek professional footballer who plays as a centre-back for Super League club Levadiakos.

== Career ==
Liagas comes from the youth ranks of Levadiakos. In 2018 he became a member of the men's team.

== Career statistics ==
As of 20 January 2026

Club	Season	League			Cup		Continental		Other		Total	
Club	Season	Division	Apps	Goals	Apps	Goals	Apps	Goals	Apps	Goals	Apps	Goals
Levadiakos	2018–19	Superleague Greece	9	0	2	1	—		—		11	1
Levadiakos	2019–20	Superleague Greece 2	16	0	1	0	—		—		17	0
Levadiakos	2020–21	Superleague Greece 2	21	2	0	0	—		—		21	2
Levadiakos	2021–22	Superleague Greece 2	24	0	5	0	—		—		29	0
Levadiakos	2022–23	Superleague Greece	20	1	0	0	—		—		20	1
Levadiakos	2023–24	Superleague Greece 2	28	2	4	0	—		—		32	2
Levadiakos	2024–25	Superleague Greece	32	1	1	0	—		—		33	1
Levadiakos	2025–26	Superleague Greece	17	1	4	1	—		—		21	2
Levadiakos	Total		167	7	17	2	0	0	0	0	184	9
Career total			167	7	17	2	0	0	0	0	184	9

== Honours ==
Levadiakos

- Super League 2: 2021–22
