= Kapsalis =

Kapsalis is a surname. Notable people with the surname include:

- Effie Kapsalis (1971–2022), American open access advocate
- Marios Kapsalis (born 1999), Greek association football player
- Stelios Kapsalis (born 1994), Greek association football player
- Thomas H. Kapsalis (1925–2022), American abstract painter, sculptor and academic
- Adonis Kapsalis (born 1980), Greek-American actor
- Christos Kapsalis (1751–1826), Hero of the Greek War of Independence

== See also ==
- The Andreas Kapsalis Trio
