= Stelios Pozatzidis =

Greek footballer

Personal information
- Full name: Stylianos Pozatzidis
- Date of birth: 24 June 1994 (age 32)
- Place of birth: Thessaloniki, Greece
- Height: 1.86 m (6 ft 1 in)
- Position: Left-back

Youth career
- 2004–2013: PAOK

Senior career*
Years	Team	Apps	(Gls)
2013–2015	PAOK	5	(0)
2014	→ Apollon Kalamarias (loan)	7	(0)
2015–2016	Panionios	2	(0)
2016–2017	AEL Kalloni	7	(0)
2017	Lamia	1	(0)
2017–2018	Anagennisi Karditsa	8	(1)
2018	Panserraikos	16	(0)
2018–2020	Platanias	38	(1)
2020–2022	Ergotelis	36	(1)
2022–2023	A.E. Kifisia	16	(0)
2023–2024	Athens Kallithea	5	(0)
2024	Iraklis Maritsa		
2024–2025	Ionikos		
2025–2026	Thyella Agios Dimitrios		
- * Club domestic league appearances and goals as of 10 December 2023

Stelios Pozatzidis (Greek: Στέλιος Ποζατζίδης; born 24 June 1994) is a Greek professional footballer who plays as a left-back.

== Career ==
Born in Thessaloniki, Pozatzidis came through the academy at PAOK, making his first team debut at age 20 in August 2014. He would make five Super League 1 appearances in the 2014/15 season before moving on from his hometown club.

After gaining experience in a series of short stints at Panionios, Kalamaria, Kalloni, and Lamia, Pozatzidis would become a regular starter for the first time in his career in the 2017/18 season, splitting the season between Karditsa and Panserraikos.

In summer 2018, Pozatzidis signed for Platanias, and he would be a key player in the team that made a run for promotion in 2018/19, ultimately finishing in second place and losing 3–2 on aggregate to Super League 1 club OFI in a promotion-relegation play-off.

Pozatzidis spent two seasons at Platanias followed by two seasons at Ergotelis, before joining Kifisia last summer.

In the 2022/23 season, Pozatzidis made 16 appearances (13 starts) as A.E. Kifisia edged out AKFC by one point to achieve promotion to the first division.

In July 2023, Pozatzidis signed with Athens Kallithea.

== Personal life ==
Pozatzidis' cousin, Theocharis, is also a professional footballer.

== Career statistics ==
As of matches played 26 September 2021

Club	Season	League			Cup		Other		Total	
Club	Season	Division	Apps	Goals	Apps	Goals	Apps	Goals	Apps	Goals
Apollon Kalamarias (loan)	2013–14	Football League	7	0	0	0	—		7	0
Apollon Kalamarias (loan)	Total		7	0	0	0	—		7	0
PAOK	2014–15	Super League Greece	5	0	2	0	—		7	0
PAOK	Total		5	0	2	0	—		7	0
Panionios	2015–16	Super League Greece	2	0	1	0	—		3	0
Panionios	Total		2	0	1	0	—		3	0
AEL Kalloni	2016–17	Football League	7	0	3	0	—		10	0
AEL Kalloni	Total		7	0	3	0	—		10	0
Lamia	2016–17	Football League	1	0	1	0	—		2	0
Lamia	Total		1	0	1	0	—		2	0
Anagennisi Karditsa	2016–17	Football League	8	1	2	0	—		10	1
Anagennisi Karditsa	Total		8	1	2	0	—		10	1
Panserraikos	2016–17	Football League	16	0	0	0	—		16	0
Panserraikos	Total		16	0	0	0	—		16	0
Platanias	2018–19	Football League	20	1	1	0	2 (Note: Appearance in the Super League relegation play-offs)	0	23	1
Platanias	2019–20	Super League Greece 2	16	0	0	0	—		16	0
Platanias	Total		36	1	1	0	2	0	39	1
Ergotelis	2020–21	Super League 2	17	0	—		—		17	0
Ergotelis	2021–22	Super League 2	0	0	1	0	—		1	0
Ergotelis	Total		17	0	1	0	—		18	0
Career total			99	2	11	0	2	0	112	2
