= Antonis Alexakis =

Greek footballer

Personal information
- Full name: Antonios Alexakis
- Date of birth: 2 July 2001 (age 25)
- Place of birth: Heraklion, Crete, Greece
- Height: 1.74 m (5 ft 9 in)
- Position: Midfielder

Team information
- Current team: Irodotos

Youth career
- 2007–2010: Atsalenios
- 2010–2019: Ergotelis

Senior career*
Years	Team	Apps	(Gls)
2019–2022	Ergotelis	17	(0)
2022–	Irodotos	0	(0)
- * Club domestic league appearances and goals as of 1 May 2022

Antonis Alexakis (Greek: Αντώνης Αλεξάκης; born 2 July 2001) is a Greek professional footballer who plays as a midfielder for Super League 2 club Irodotos.

== Career statistics ==
=== Club ===
As of 17 March 2021

Club	Season	League			Cup		Europe		Total	
Club	Season	Division	Apps	Goals	Apps	Goals	Apps	Goals	Apps	Goals
Ergotelis	2019–20	Super League Greece 2	1	0	1	0	–		2	0
Ergotelis	2020–21	Super League Greece 2	3	0	–		–		3	0
Ergotelis	Total		4	0	1	0	0	0	5	0
