= Edison Kola =

Greek footballer (born 2001)

Personal information
- Date of birth: 3 April 2001 (age 25)
- Place of birth: Heraklion, Crete, Greece
- Height: 1.90 m (6 ft 3 in)
- Position: Centre-back

Team information
- Current team: Struga
- Number: 80

Youth career
- –2020: Ergotelis

Senior career*
Years	Team	Apps	(Gls)
2020–2022	Ergotelis	36	(1)
2022–2023	Ierapetra	5	(0)
2023	AEL	8	(0)
2023–2024	AO Giouchtas	31	(0)
2024–2026	Tirana	36	(2)
2026–	Struga	5	(0)
- * Club domestic league appearances and goals as of 13 October 2026

Edison Kola (born 3 April 2001) is an Albanian-Greek professional footballer who plays as a centre-back.

== Club career ==
=== Struga ===
On August 2026, Kola signed for Struga of the Macedonian First Football League.

== Career statistics ==
=== Club ===
As of 26 September 2021

Club	Season	League			Cup		Europe		Total	
Club	Season	Division	Apps	Goals	Apps	Goals	Apps	Goals	Apps	Goals
Ergotelis	2020–21	Super League Greece 2	8	1	–		–		8	1
Ergotelis	2021–22	Super League Greece 2	0	0	1	0	–		1	0
Ergotelis	Total		8	1	1	0	0	0	9	1
