= Giannis Gotsoulias =

Greek association footballer

Personal information
- Full name: Ioannis Gotsoulias
- Date of birth: 15 March 1990 (age 36)
- Place of birth: Patras, Greece
- Height: 1.70 m (5 ft 7 in)
- Position: Defensive midfielder

Team information
- Current team: Aris Petroupolis
- Number: 10

Senior career*
Years	Team	Apps	(Gls)
–2010	Diagoras Vrachneika	26	(1)
2010–2016	Panegialios	91	(2)
2016–2017	Ergotelis	24	(0)
2017–2018	Paniliakos	20	(3)
2018–2022	Ionikos	67	(1)
2022–2024	Ilioupoli	26	(0)
2024-	Aris Petroupolis	11	
- * Club domestic league appearances and goals as of 16 June 2023

Giannis Gotsoulias (Greek: Γιάννης Γκοτσούλιας; born 15 March 1990) is a Greek professional footballer who plays as a defensive midfielder for Gamma Ethiniki club Aris Petroupolis.

== Career ==
Born in Patras, Greece, Giannis made his senior debut with Panegialios and had the contract with the club until 2016. On 7 September 2016, he joined Panegialios. He profoundly played for Greek clubs.

Initially signed by the Greek club Diagoras Vrachneikon, he had no appearance for the senior squad and followed a transfer to Panegialios in 2010 He played 7 years at the Gamma Ethniki club securing a marvelous 91 appearances netting the ball twice in this era. . He then signed a contract of one year with Greek club playing for Ergotelis and remained for the club until 2017. At this phase of his life he first appeared Super League 2 but secured no senior appearances for the club. In the mid of 2017 .Gotsoulias signed a year spell with the Gamma Ethniki side Paniliakos. In 2018 Gotsoulias signed at Ionikos acting as the skipper of the side playing in Football League an has smashed the ball one into the nets against Aiolikos., he stayed there for the following two seasons.

in the summer of 2022 Gotsoulias moved to Ilioupoli where he stayed for the following two seasons amassing 26 appearances.

In July 2024 Gotsoulias was transferred to Aris Petroupolis on a free transfer, where he plays to this day.

He has featured in various famous competitions namely Greek Football Cup or Kypello Elladas (Greek), Gamma Ethniki, Super League 2 and Football League.

== Career statistics ==
Appearances and goals by club, season and competition
Club	Season	League			Cup		Total	
Club	Season	Division	Apps	Goals	Apps	Goals	Apps	Goals
Panegialios	2010–11	Football League	—	—	2	0	2	1
Panegialios	2012–13	Football League	—	—	2	0	2	1
Panegialios	2013–14	Football League	26	1	1	0	27	1
Panegialios	2014–15	Football League	27	0	—	—	27	0
Panegialios	2015–16	Football League	28	1	3	0	31	1
Ionikos	2018–19	Gamma Ethniki	2	1	—	—	2	1
Ionikos	2018–19	Football League	18	0	2	0	20	0

== Honours ==
Ionikos

- Super League Greece 2: 2020–21
