= Marios Kapsalis =

Greek footballer

Personal information
- Date of birth: 6 September 1999 (age 27)
- Place of birth: Arta, Greece
- Height: 1.78 m (5 ft 10 in)
- Position: Right-back

Team information
- Current team: Iraklis Larissa
- Number: 32

Youth career
- 2015–2017: Karaiskakis

Senior career*
Years	Team	Apps	(Gls)
2017–2020	Karaiskakis	36	(0)
2020–2021	Ierapetra	15	(0)
2021–2022	Chania	20	(0)
2022–	Iraklis Larissa	1	(0)
- * Club domestic league appearances and goals as of 6 November 2022

Marios Kapsalis (Greek: Μάριος Καψάλης; born 6 September 1999) is a Greek professional footballer who plays as a right-back for Super League 2 club Iraklis Larissa.
