= Athanasios Kostanasios =

Greek association footballer

Thanasis Kostanasios
Personal information
- Full name: Athanasios Kostanasios
- Date of birth: 11 January 1999 (age 27)
- Place of birth: Piraeus, Greece
- Height: 1.79 m (5 ft 10 in)
- Position: Attacking midfielder

Team information
- Current team: Panachaiki
- Number: 77

Youth career
- Olympiacos

Senior career*
| Years | Team | Apps | (Gls) |
| 2018–2020 | Olympiacos | 1 | (0) |
| 2020–2022 | Ergotelis | 50 | (7) |
| 2022–2023 | Athens Kallithea | 4 | (1) |
| 2023 | → Egaleo (loan) | 12 | (2) |
| 2023–2024 | Giouchtas | 29 | (2) |
| 2024–2026 | Chania | 28 | (1) |
| 2026– | Panachaiki | 0 | (0) |

International career^{‡}
| 2014 | Greece U16 | 1 | (0) |
| 2015–2016 | Greece U17 | 8 | (1) |
| 2017 | Greece U18 | 5 | (2) |
| 2017 | Greece U19 | 9 | (1) |
| 2018 | Greece U20 | 2 | (0) |
- * Club domestic league appearances and goals as of 18 January 2026 ‡ National team caps and goals as of 11 January 2018

Athanasios 'Thanasis' Kostanasios (Greek: Αθανάσιος 'Θανάσης' Κωστανάσιος; born 11 January 1999) is a Greek professional footballer who plays as an attacking midfielder for Gamma Ethniki club Panachaiki.

== Club career ==
Born in Piraeus, Kostanasios came through the academy of Olympiacos, featuring for the club's Under-19 and Under-20 team and making one first team appearance in a Super League 1 match in May 2018. From Olympiacos, Kostanasios would join Super League 2 side Ergotelis, where he made 51 appearances with seven goals across two seasons.

In July 2022, Kostanasios joined Athens Kallithea FC.

In July 2026, Kostanasios joined Panachaiki.

== International career ==
At international level, Kostanasios earned 26 caps with five goals representing Greece from the Under-16 to Under-20 levels.

== Honours ==
Olympiacos

- Super League: 2019–20
