= Nikos Masouras =

Greek footballer

Personal information
- Full name: Nikolaos Masouras
- Date of birth: 15 June 2001 (age 25)
- Place of birth: Preveza, Greece
- Position: Left winger

Senior career*
Years	Team	Apps	(Gls)
2019–2021	Panachaiki	40	(4)
2021–2022	Iraklis	20	(0)
2023–2025	Panachaiki	42	(3)
2025–2026	Sevlievo	7	(0)
2026-	Panachaiki	?	(?)

International career^{‡}
2017–2018	Greece U17	4	(0)
- * Club domestic league appearances and goals as of 17 October 2025 ‡ National team caps and goals as of 18:02, 12 November 2019 (UTC)

Nikos Masouras (Greek: Νίκος Μασούρας; born 15 June 2001) is a Greek professional footballer who plays as a left winger.

== Career statistics ==
=== Club ===
As of 12 November 2019.

Club	Season	League			Cup		Other		Total	
Club	Season	Division	Apps	Goals	Apps	Goals	Apps	Goals	Apps	Goals
Panachaiki	2017–18	Football League	8	2	3 (Note: Appearances in the Greek Cup)	0	0	0	11	2
Panachaiki	2018–19	Football League	2	0	2	0	0	0	4	0
Panachaiki	2019–20	Super League 2	2	0	1	0	0	0	3	0
Career total			12	2	6	0	0	0	18	2
