= Sotirios Kokkinis =

Greek footballer

Sotiris Kokkinis
Personal information
- Full name: Sotirios Kokkinis
- Date of birth: 11 July 2000 (age 26)
- Place of birth: Preveza, Greece
- Height: 1.77 m (5 ft 10 in)
- Position: Forward

Team information
- Current team: Diagoras
- Number: 11

Youth career
- –2010: Borussia Mönchengladbach
- 2010–2014: VVV-Venlo
- 2014–2016: Schalke 04
- 2016–2020: VVV-Venlo
- 2020–2021: Willem II

Senior career*
Years	Team	Apps	(Gls)
2021–2022	Ergotelis	45	(4)
2022	Ionikos	1	(0)
2023	Chania	8	(0)
2023–2024	Anagennisi Karditsa	25	(2)
2024–	Diagoras	7	(0)
- * Club domestic league appearances and goals as of 20:55, 13 January 2025 (UTC)

Sotirios Kokkinis (Greek: Σωτήριος Κοκκίνης; born 11 July 2000) is a Greek professional footballer who plays as a left winger for Super League 2 club Diagoras,

== Early years ==
Having been born in Preveza, Greece, Kokkinis grew up in Germany thus receiving German citizenship. He began his football career at the youth team of Borussia Mönchengladbach, and later transferred to VVV-Venlo Youth in the Netherlands. In 2014 he returned to Germany and joined Schalke 04, competing with the Youth and U-16 team until 2017, when he returned to VVV-Venlo. In 2020, Kokkinis transferred to Willem II, where he was part of the club's U-21 team.

== Career ==
In January 2021, Kokkinis returned to Greece and signed his first professional contract with Super League 2 side Ergotelis.

== Career statistics ==
=== Club ===
As of 19 May 2021

Club	Season	League			Cup		Europe		Total	
Club	Season	Division	Apps	Goals	Apps	Goals	Apps	Goals	Apps	Goals
Ergotelis	2020–21	Super League Greece 2	16	4	–		–		16	4
Ergotelis	Total		16	4	0	0	0	0	16	4
