= Jeffrey Neral =

Dutch footballer (born 1997)

Personal information
- Full name: Jeffrey Virgil Neral
- Date of birth: 9 December 1997 (age 28)
- Place of birth: Rotterdam, Netherlands
- Height: 1.78 m (5 ft 10 in)
- Position: Right-back

Team information
- Current team: VVSB
- Number: 2

Youth career
- RSV HION
- Feyenoord
- Alexandria '66
- 2009–2010: Excelsior
- 2010–2015: Sparta Rotterdam

Senior career*
Years	Team	Apps	(Gls)
2015–2018	Sparta Rotterdam	1	(0)
2016–2018	Jong Sparta	24	(0)
2018	SteDoCo	2	(0)
2019–2020	Helmond Sport	6	(0)
2020–2022	Ergotelis	30	(0)
2022–2023	Rupel Boom	30	(0)
2023–2025	Kozakken Boys	44	(1)
2025–	VVSB	0	(0)
- * Club domestic league appearances and goals as of 08:13, 20 July 2025 (UTC)

Jeffrey Virgil Neral (born 9 December 1997) is a Dutch footballer who plays as a right-back for VVSB.

== Club career ==
As a youth, Neral played for a number of football academies, including those of Feyenoord, Excelsior and Sparta Rotterdam. He signed a professional contract with the latter in 2015, and made his debut on 18 October 2015 in a match vs. FC Oss. He won the Eerste Divisie trophy in 2016 and celebrated the club's promotion to the top flight. He then was assigned to the reserve team, Jong Sparta, where he played the remainder of his contract in the Tweede Divisie. In January 2018 he was released from his contract.

In November 2018, Neral joined amateur Derde Divisie side SteDoCo, but left the club after making two appearances to undergo trial with Slovak side AS Trenčín, without however signing a contract with the club. Neral returned to the Netherlands to again undergo a trial period at Excelsior Maassluis, but did not play for the remainder of the 2018−19 season. In June 2019, he joined Eerste Divisie side Helmond Sport.

During the summer transfer window of 2020, Neral left his home country and joined Greek second-division club Ergotelis on a free transfer. After playing for Belgian club Rupel Boom in the 2022–23 season, he returned to the Netherlands to sign for Kozakken Boys in September 2023.

== Personal life ==
Born in the Netherlands, Neral is of Surinamese descent.

== Career statistics ==
As of match played 3 February 2024

Club	Season	League			Cup		Other		Total	
Club	Season	Division	Apps	Goals	Apps	Goals	Apps	Goals	Apps	Goals
Sparta Rotterdam	2015–16	Eerste Divisie	1	0	0	0	—		1	0
Sparta Rotterdam	2016–17	Eredivisie	0	0	0	0	—		0	0
Sparta Rotterdam	Total		1	0	0	0	—		1	0
Jong Sparta	2016–17	Tweede Divisie	21	0	—		—		21	0
Jong Sparta	2017–18	Tweede Divisie	3	0	—		—		3	0
Jong Sparta	Total		24	0	—		—		34	5
SteDoCo	2018–19	Derde Divisie	2	0	—		—		2	0
Helmond Sport	2019–20	Eerste Divisie	6	0	0	0	—		6	0
Ergotelis	2020–21	Super League 2	9	0	—		—		9	0
Ergotelis	2021–22	Super League 2	21	0	0	0	—		21	0
Ergotelis	Total		30	0	0	0	—		30	0
Rupel Boom	2022–23	National Division 1	30	0	0	0	—		30	0
Kozakken Boys	2023–24	Tweede Divisie	15	0	1	0	—		16	0
Career total			108	0	1	0	—		109	0

== Honours ==
Sparta Rotterdam

- Eerste Divisie: 2015–16
