= Nikos Papanikou =

Greek footballer

Personal information
- Full name: Nikolaos Papanikou
- Date of birth: 5 January 1992 (age 34)
- Place of birth: Arta, Greece
- Height: 1.70 m (5 ft 7 in)
- Position: Right-back

Team information
- Current team: Karaiskakis
- Number: 24

Senior career*
Years	Team	Apps	(Gls)
2011–2012	Tilikratis	20	(1)
2012–2013	Thrasyvoulos	17	(0)
2013–	Karaiskakis	90	(2)
- * Club domestic league appearances and goals as of 17 March 2021

Nikos Papanikou (Greek: Νίκος Παπανίκου; born 5 January 1992) is a Greek professional footballer who plays as a right-back for Super League 2 club Karaiskakis.
