= Dimitrios Sandravelis =

Greek footballer

Personal information
- Full name: Dimitrios Sandravelis
- Date of birth: 23 March 1990 (age 36)
- Place of birth: Patras, Greece
- Height: 1.77 m (5 ft 10 in)
- Position: Right-back

Team information
- Current team: Trikala
- Number: 22

Senior career*
Years	Team	Apps	(Gls)
2006–2017	Panegialios	156	(4)
2017	Trikala	12	(1)
2017–2018	Ermis Aradippou	11	(0)
2018	Sparta	5	(0)
2018–2019	Kerkyra	18	(1)
2019–2020	Trikala	22	(0)
2020–2021	Diagoras	23	(1)
2021–	Trikala	31	(0)
- * Club domestic league appearances and goals as of 16 April 2022

Dimitrios Sandravelis (Greek: Δημήτριος Σανδραβέλης; born 23 March 1990) is a Greek professional footballer who plays as a right-back for Super League 2 club Trikala.
