= Georgios Servilakis =

Greek footballer

Personal information
- Date of birth: 18 May 1997 (age 29)
- Place of birth: Rethymno, Crete, Greece
- Height: 1.75 m (5 ft 9 in)
- Position: Left-back

Team information
- Current team: Chania
- Number: 18

Youth career
- 2010–2017: Panathinaikos

Senior career*
Years	Team	Apps	(Gls)
2017–2018	AO Chania – Kissamikos	4	(0)
2018–2019	Episkopi	23	(1)
2019–2020	Thesprotos	20	(0)
2020–2022	Ergotelis	51	(0)
2022	Ionikos	0	(0)
2023–2024	Chania	9	(1)
2024–2025	Spartakos	17	(2)
2025–	Chania	12	(0)
- * Club domestic league appearances and goals as of 11 January 2026

Georgios Servilakis (Greek: Γεώργιος Σερβιλάκης; born 18 May 1997) is a Greek professional footballer who plays as a left-back for Super League 2 club Chania.

== Career ==
Servilakis attended Panathinaikos F.C. Academy for seven years, from 2010 to 2017. In the summer of 2017, he moved to Crete, where he played for Football League side AO Chania – Kissamikos during the 2017–18 season. The next year he dropped to the Gamma Ethniki, playing in 23 games with Episkopi and scoring one goal. In September 2019, Servilakis joined Thesprotos.
