= Marios Zounis =

Greek footballer

Personal information
- Full name: Michail Marios Zounis
- Date of birth: 20 February 2001 (age 25)
- Place of birth: Rhodes, Greece
- Positions: Winger; forward

Youth career
- 2016–2021: Atromitos

Senior career*
Years	Team	Apps	(Gls)
2021–2023	Atromitos	0	(0)
2021–2022	→ Diagoras (loan)	29	(5)
2022–2023	→ Chania (loan)	6	(0)
2023	→ P.A.O. Rouf (loan)	10	(1)
2023–2024	Rodos		
2024–2025	Egaleo	10	(0)
- * Club domestic league appearances and goals as of 1 July 2025

Marios Zounis (Greek: Μάριος Ζούνης; born 20 February 2001) is a Greek professional footballer who plays as a forward.
