= Panagiotis Panagiotidis =

Greek association football player (born 1998)

Personal information
- Date of birth: 4 August 1998 (age 28)
- Place of birth: Düsseldorf, Germany
- Height: 1.84 m (6 ft 1/2 in)
- Position: Defensive midfielder

Team information
- Current team: Iraklis
- Number: 20

Youth career
- 2012–2015: PAOK
- 2015–2016: Iraklis
- 2016–2017: Panetolikos
- 2017–2018: Kerkyra

Senior career*
Years	Team	Apps	(Gls)
2018–2020	Kerkyra	21	(2)
2020–2021	Episkopi	17	(0)
2021–2024	Niki Volos	74	(8)
2024–2025	AEL	23	(0)
2025–	Iraklis	18	(4)
- * Club domestic league appearances and goals as of July 5, 2026

Panagiotis Panagiotidis (Greek: Παναγιώτης Παναγιωτίδης; born 4 August 1998) is a Greek professional footballer who plays as a defensive midfielder for Super League club Iraklis.

== Honours ==
=== AEL ===
- Super League Greece 2: 2024–25
