= Lazaros Eleftheriadis =

Greek association footballer (born 1997)

Personal information
- Date of birth: 2 September 1997 (age 29)
- Place of birth: Aridea, Greece
- Positions: Central attacking midfielder; right winger; left winger

Team information
- Current team: Veria
- Number: 88

Youth career
- 2014–2015: Almopos Aridea

Senior career*
Years	Team	Apps	(Gls)
2015–2016	Thyella Filotas	28	(1)
2016–2019	Almopos Aridea	70	(10)
2019–2022	Trikala	51	(5)
2022	Chania	5	(0)
2023–2023	Veria	15	(1)
2023-2024	Panargiakos F.C.		
2024-2025	Thiva F.C.		
2025-2026	A.P.S. Zakynthos	7	(0)
2026-2026	PAOK Dytikou	7	(0)
2026-	Almopos Aridea		
- * Club domestic league appearances and goals as of 17 Oct 2026

Lazaros Eleftheriadis (Greek: Λάζαρος Ελευθεριάδης; born 2 September 1997) is a Greek professional footballer who plays as an attacking midfielder and winger Super League 2 club Veria.

== Career ==
Eleftheriadis made his debut as a senior player with Trikala, a Greek Football League club, in the 2019–20 season.

Initially signed by the Greek club own under 19, he had no appearances for the senior squad and was transferred to Almopos Aridea in 2014. He then signed up with Thyella Filotas, playing in the Gamma Ethniki, where he remained until 2016. By mid 2016, he signed a three-season contract with the Almopos Aridea team playing in the Gamma Ethniki.

In 2019, he penned a deal with Trikala, and made appearances in the Greek Football Cup in 2019–20 season.

== Career statistics ==
Appearances and goals by club, season and competition
Club	Season	League			Cup		Total	
Club	Season	Division	Apps	Goals	Apps	Goals	Apps	Goals
Trikala	2019–20	Football League	3	0	5	1	8	0
