= Tyrone Conraad =

Surinamese football player

Personal information
- Full name: Tyrone Ryan Conraad
- Date of birth: 7 April 1997 (age 29)
- Place of birth: Rotterdam, Netherlands
- Height: 1.81 m (5 ft 11 in)
- Position: Forward

Team information
- Current team: Shijiazhuang Gongfu
- Number: 7

Youth career
- –2007: Alexandria '66
- 2007–2011: Feyenoord
- 2011–2016: Sparta

Senior career*
Years	Team	Apps	(Gls)
2014–2015	Sparta	0	(0)
2016–2019	Cambuur	30	(4)
2019–2020	Kozakken Boys	24	(7)
2020–2022	Ergotelis	52	(15)
2022–2023	Sutjeska Nikšić	33	(25)
2023–2024	Meizhou Hakka	40	(12)
2024–2025	Sharjah	16	(4)
2025	TSC	8	(1)
2026–	Shijiazhuang Gongfu	0	(0)

International career^{‡}
2024–	Suriname	2	(2)
- * Club domestic league appearances and goals as of 2 August 2025 ‡ National team caps and goals as of 8 June 2024

Tyrone Ryan Conraad (born 7 April 1997) is a professional footballer who plays as a forward for Chinese club Shijiazhuang Gongfu. Born in the Netherlands, he plays for the Suriname national team.

== Club career ==
As a youth, Conraad played for the football academies of Feyenoord and Sparta Rotterdam. He eventually signed his first professional contract with Sparta but made no official appearances for the club. In the summer of 2016, Conraad moved to SC Cambuur, where he made his professional debut in the Eerste Divisie on 14 October 2016, in a game against FC Den Bosch. He played in six matches for Cambuur during the 2016–17 season before being assigned to the reserves for the duration of the next season. In his third year with Cambuur, Conraad returned to the first squad and played in a total of 24 matches. In the summer of 2019, he moved to third-division club Kozakken Boys on a free transfer, where he emerged as club top-scorer with seven goals in 24 matches.

During the summer transfer window of 2020, Conraad left his home country and joined Greek second-division club Ergotelis on a free transfer.

On 25 June 2023, Conraad signed with Chinese Super League side Meizhou Hakka.

On 23 January 2026, Conraad signed with China League One side Shijiazhuang Gongfu.

== International career ==
Conraad made his debut for the Suriname national team on 8 June 2024 in a World Cup qualifier against Anguilla at the Raymond E. Guishard Technical Centre. He scored twice as Suriname won 4–1.

== Personal life ==
Born in the Netherlands, Conraad is of Surinamese descent.

Conraad is a cousin of former Real Madrid midfielder Royston Drenthe.

== Career statistics ==
=== Club ===
As of match played 30 November 2025

Appearances and goals by club, season and competition
Club	Season	League			Cup		Continental		Other		Total	
Club	Season	Division	Apps	Goals	Apps	Goals	Apps	Goals	Apps	Goals	Apps	Goals
Sparta Rotterdam	2014–15	Eerste Divisie	0	0	0	0	—		—		0	0
SC Cambuur	2016–17	Eerste Divisie	6	0	0	0	—		0	0	6	0
SC Cambuur	2017–18	Eerste Divisie	0	0	0	0	—		0	0	0	0
SC Cambuur	2018–19	Eerste Divisie	24	4	3	1	—		1	0	0	0
SC Cambuur	Total		30	4	3	1	—		1	0	34	5
Kozakken Boys	2019–20	Tweede Divisie	24	7	1	0	—		—		25	7
Ergotelis	2020–21	Super League Greece 2	27	7	—		—		—		27	7
Ergotelis	2021–22	Super League Greece 2	25	8	—		—		—		25	8
Ergotelis	Total		52	15	0	0	—		—		52	15
Sutjeska Nikšić	2022–23	Montenegrin First League	33	25	4	2	4	0	0	0	41	27
Meizhou Hakka	2023	Chinese Super League	15	7	0	0	—		—		15	7
Meizhou Hakka	2024	Chinese Super League	25	5	0	0	—		—		25	5
Meizhou Hakka	Total		40	12	0	0	—		—		40	12
Sharjah	2024–25	UAE Pro League	16	4	4	1	8	0	2	0	30	5
TSC	2025–26	Serbian SuperLiga	8	1	0	0	—		—		8	1
Career total			203	68	12	4	12	0	3	0	230	72

== Honours ==
Sharjah

- AFC Champions League Two: 2024–25

Individual

- Montenegrin First League Top Score: 2022–23 (26 goals)
