= Georgios Manousakis =

Greek footballer (born 1998)

Personal information
- Date of birth: 10 April 1998 (age 28)
- Place of birth: Heraklion, Crete, Greece
- Height: 1.82 m (6 ft 0 in)
- Positions: Winger; striker

Team information
- Current team: Anagennisi Karditsa
- Number: 10

Youth career
- 2004–2016: Ergotelis

Senior career*
Years	Team	Apps	(Gls)
2016–2021	Ergotelis	66	(13)
2016	→ P.A.O. Krousonas (loan)	14	(4)
2021–2022	Lamia	14	(0)
2022–2023	Iraklis	8	(0)
2023–2025	Chania	65	(9)
2025–	Anagennisi Karditsa	12	(0)
- * Club domestic league appearances and goals as of 20 April 2026

Georgios Manousakis (Greek: Γεώργιος Μανουσάκης; born 10 April 1998) is a Greek professional footballer who plays as a striker for Super League 2 club Anagennisi Karditsa.

== Career statistics ==
As of matches played May 19, 2021

Club	Season	League			Cup		Continental		Other		Total	
Club	Season	Division	Apps	Goals	Apps	Goals	Apps	Goals	Apps	Goals	Apps	Goals
P.A.O. Krousonas (loan)	2015–16	Gamma Ethniki	14	4	—		—		—		14	4
Total			14	4	—		—		—		14	4
Ergotelis	2016–17	Gamma Ethniki	11	0	—		—		2 (Note: Appearance in the Gamma Ethniki Cup)	0	13	0
Ergotelis	2017–18	Football League	9	0	1	0	—		—		10	0
Ergotelis	2018–19	Football League	11	3	0	0	—		—		11	3
Ergotelis	2019–20	Superleague 2	8	0	2	0	—		—		10	0
Ergotelis	2020–21	Superleague 2	27	10	—		—		—		27	10
Total			66	13	3	0	—		2	0	71	13
Career total			80	17	3	0	—		2	0	85	17
