= Giannis Koutantos =

Greek footballer (born 2000)

Personal information
- Full name: Ioannis Koutantos
- Date of birth: 31 January 2000 (age 26)
- Place of birth: Heraklion, Crete, Greece
- Height: 1.78 m (5 ft 10 in)
- Position: Attacking midfielder

Team information
- Current team: Irodotos

Senior career*
Years	Team	Apps	(Gls)
2020–2022	Ergotelis	13	(0)
2021	→ Episkopi (loan)	9	(0)
2022–	Irodotos	0	(0)
- * Club domestic league appearances and goals as of 1 May 2022

Giannis Koutantos (Greek: Γιάννης Κουτάντος; born 31 January 2000) is a Greek professional footballer who plays as an attacking midfielder for Super League 2 club Irodotos.
