= Matías Castro (footballer, born 1991) =

Argentine footballer (born 1991)

Matías Gastón Castro
Personal information
- Date of birth: 18 December 1991 (age 34)
- Place of birth: Neuquén, Argentina
- Height: 1.82 m (6 ft 0 in)
- Position: Striker

Team information
- Current team: Vibonese

Senior career*
| Years | Team | Apps | (Gls) |
| 2007–2012 | C.A.I. | 19 | (4) |
| 2012–2013 | El Porvenir | 31 | (2) |
| 2013–2014 | Cambaceres | 37 | (17) |
| 2014–2015 | Danubio | 27 | (9) |
| 2015 | Unión Santa Fe | 5 | (0) |
| 2016 | Unión La Calera | 5 | (1) |
| 2016 | Villa Española | 9 | (0) |
| 2017 | San Marcos | 11 | (4) |
| 2017–2019 | Xanthi | 39 | (8) |
| 2019 | Montevideo Wanderers | 15 | (5) |
| 2020 | Xanthi | 8 | (1) |
| 2020–2021 | Ionikos | 27 | (15) |
| 2021 | Santa Fe | 11 | (3) |
| 2022 | Al-Wehdat | 2 | (0) |
| 2022 | Montevideo Wanderers | 10 | (1) |
| 2023 | Sportivo Luqueño | 25 | (2) |
| 2024 | Gimnasia de Mendoza | 7 | (1) |
| 2024 | Deportivo Morón | 13 | (0) |
| 2025 | Atlético Rafaela | 13 | (2) |
| 2025 | Sancataldese | 16 | (8) |
| 2026 | Gelbison | 8 | (2) |
| 2026– | Vibonese | 0 | (0) |
- * Club domestic league appearances and goals as of 12 August 2025

Matías Gastón Castro (born 18 December 1991) is an Argentine-Chilean professional footballer who plays as a striker for Italian club Vibonese.

== Career ==
In 2021, Castro joined Colombian club Independiente de Santa Fe. In 2022, he moved to Jordanian club Al-Wehdat. On second half 2022, he returned to South America and signed with Montevideo Wanderers.

In February 2023, Castro joined Paraguayan side Sportivo Luqueño.

Back to Argentina, Castro played for Gimnasia y Esgrima de Mendoza and Deportivo Morón during 2024. In February 2025, he signed with Atlético Rafaela.

On 29 July 2025, Castro moved to Italy and joined Serie D club Sancataldese.

In 2026, Castro signed with Gelbison and switched to Vibonese for the second half of the year.

== Personal life ==
He holds dual nationality: Argentine-Chilean. In 2017, he acquired the Chilean nationality by descent according to the Chilean law, due to the fact that his paternal grandfather is Chilean.

== Honours ==
Ionikos

- Super League Greece 2: 2020–21
