= Abdulsamed Abdullahi =

Somali footballer (born 1997)

Personal information
- Full name: Abdulsamed Ahmed Abdullahi
- Date of birth: 19 January 1997 (age 29)
- Place of birth: Tilburg, Netherlands
- Height: 1.83 m (6 ft 0 in)
- Position: Midfielder

Team information
- Current team: Arsenal Tivat
- Number: 88

Senior career*
Years	Team	Apps	(Gls)
2016–2018	Kozakken Boys	46	(5)
2018–2019	Jong Sparta	19	(3)
2019–2020	Den Bosch	19	(1)
2020–2022	Ergotelis	33	(1)
2023	TEC	1	(0)
2023	Mladost DG	17	(3)
2024	Dečić	15	(2)
2024–2025	Arsenal Tivat	33	(11)
2025–2026	Novi Pazar	14	(1)
2026–	Arsenal Tivat	7	(1)

International career^{‡}
2019–	Somalia	15	(0)
- * Club domestic league appearances and goals as of 19 September 2026 ‡ National team caps and goals as of 13 July 2025

Abdulsamed Ahmed Abdullahi (Somali; Cabdisamad Axmad Cabdullaahi, born 19 January 1997) is a professional footballer who plays as a midfielder for Montenegrin First League club Arsenal Tivat. Born in Netherlands, he plays and captains the Somalia national team.

== Club career ==
Abdullahi signed his first professional contract with FC Den Bosch on 9 August 2019. Abdullahi made his professional debut with Jong PSV on 12 August 2019.

== International career ==
Born in the Netherlands, Abdullahi is of Somali descent. Abdullahi represented the Somalia national football team in a 1–0 2022 FIFA World Cup qualification win over Zimbabwe on 5 September 2019.
