= Giannis Taousianis =

Greek footballer & manager (born 1972)

Personal information
- Full name: Ioannis Taousianis
- Date of birth: 27 June 1972 (age 54)
- Place of birth: Thessaloniki, Greece
- Position: Midfielder

Team information
- Current team: Greece U21 (manager)

Senior career*
Years	Team	Apps	(Gls)
1996−2006	Atsalenios	71	(3)

Managerial career
- 2007: PAS Minoiki Heraklion
- 2007–2009: Atsalenios
- 2010–2011: Giouchtas
- 2011: Asteras Tripolis (assistant)
- 2012: Rouvas
- 2012–2013: Panthrakikos (assistant)
- 2013: OFI (assistant)
- 2014–2015: Ergotelis
- 2014: → assistant
- 2014–2015: → caretaker
- 2015: → manager
- 2015–2016: Aiolikos
- 2016: Kavala
- 2017–2019: PAS Giannina (assistant)
- 2019–2021: Ergotelis
- 2021–2022: Levadiakos
- 2022–2023: AEL
- 2023–2024: Chania
- 2024–: Greece U21
- * Club domestic league appearances and goals

Giannis Taousianis (Greek: Γιάννης Ταουσιάνης; born 27 June 1972) is a Greek professional football manager and former player, who is the current manager of Greece U21 national team.

== Playing career ==
As a player, Taousianis played for many amateur clubs in Crete. He had a short professional stint during his ten years with Atsalenios, when the club competed in the Gamma Ethniki during 2003−2006. He made 71 appearances for the club during that period, and scored 3 goals. In May 2006, Taousianis retired at the age of 34, at the time serving as player-assistant manager under coach Pavlos Dermitzakis.

== Managerial career ==
Taousianis began his coaching career in 2007, taking over management of Heraklion FCA club PAS Minoiki Heraklion. He took over Atsalenios in November the same year, staying with the club until December 2009 and boasting a record of 23 wins, 21 draws και 29 losses. In the summer of 2010, he agreed to a contract with Heraklion FCA club Giouchtas, but left the club in January 2011 to join the coaching staff of Pavlos Dermitzakis at Super League club Asteras Tripolis. The duo left Asteras Tripolis in May.

In January 2012, Taousianis was appointed manager of third tier Cretan club newcomers Rouvas, replacing Myron Sifakis. Although he managed to avoid relegation in the club's first ever season in a professional Division, his contract was terminated in July. In October, he rejoined Dermitzakis at Super League club Panthrakikos, where they stayed until 30 April 2013. In May, the duo were hired by Cretan Super League club OFI, leaving the club in October.

In July 2014, Taousianis was hired by Cretan Super League club Ergotelis as assistant manager to newly appointed head coach Juan Ferrando. After Ferrando was sacked, Taousianis reunited with Dermitzakis, who was appointed as Ferrando's replacement. After the club terminated its contract with Dermitzakis in December, Taousianis took over as interim manager. As the club showed some improvement over the next three games, Taousianis was decidedly appointed head coach in January 2015. Despite achieving important wins over Platanias and OFI and giving Ergotelis a fighting chance to avoid relegation, Taousianis was surprisingly sacked by the club in favour of more experienced manager Ioannis Matzourakis. However, Matzourakis resigned after just 13 days, after failing to win two crucial home matches and thus deeming his task to avoid relegation impossible. As such, Taousianis returned as head coach until the end of the season, but eventually failed to keep the club in top-flight.

Taousianis left an uncertain Ergotelis in the summer of 2015 to assume the head coach position at Gamma Ethniki club Aiolikos, but was sacked in February 2016. Several days later, he was hired as head coach by fellow Gamma Ethniki club Kavala, but was once again relieved of his duties in October. In February 2017, Taousianis was hired by Epirus-based Super League club PAS Giannina as assistant to head coach Giannis Petrakis. He remained at his post until the summer of 2019, when PAS Giannina were relegated to the Super League 2.

In September 2019, Taousianis returned to Ergotelis, taking over as head coach after the sudden departure of preceding coach Nikodimos Papavasiliou.

== Honours ==
=== Manager ===
Levadiakos

- Super League 2: 2021–22
