= Nikos Kechagias (footballer, born 2000) =

Greek footballer

Personal information
- Full name: Nikolaos Kechagias
- Date of birth: 24 April 2000 (age 26)
- Place of birth: Thessaloniki, Greece
- Height: 1.84 m (6 ft 0 in)
- Position: Centre-back

Team information
- Current team: Aiolikos
- Number: 24

Youth career
- 2014–2017: Agrotikos Asteras

Senior career*
Years	Team	Apps	(Gls)
2017–2018	Agrotikos Asteras	23	(1)
2018–2020	Chania	1	(0)
2020–2022	Trikala	29	(0)
- * Club domestic league appearances and goals as of 12 April 2022

Nikos Kechagias (Greek: Νίκος Κεχαγιάς; born 24 April 2000) is a Greek professional footballer who plays as a centre-back for Super League 2 club Aiolikos.
