= Kostas Vasilakakis =

Greek footballer and manager

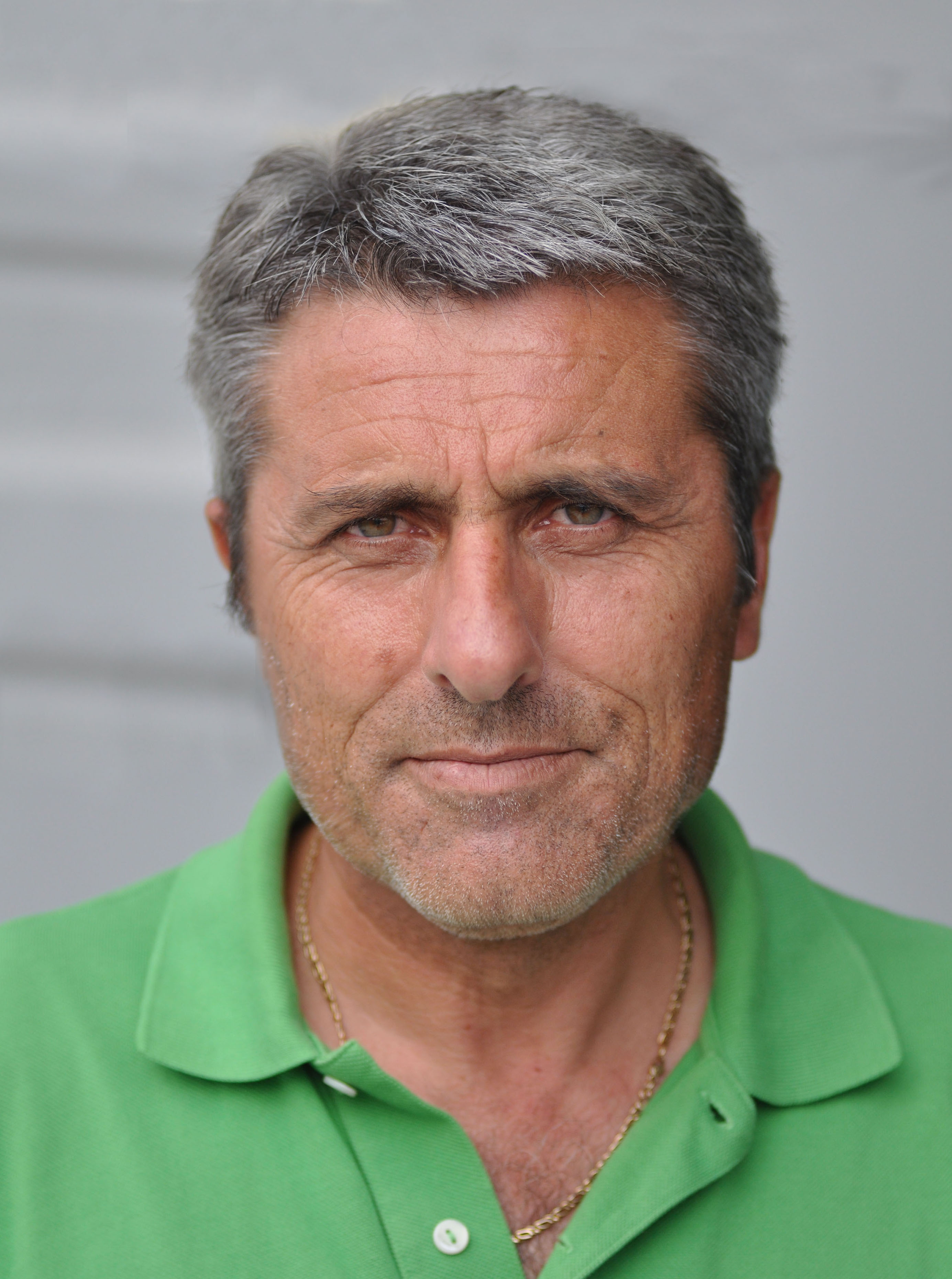

Personal information
- Full name: Konstantinos Vasilakakis
- Date of birth: 27 March 1957 (age 69)
- Place of birth: Porpi, Komotini, Greece
- Height: 1.82 m (6 ft 0 in)
- Position: Central defender

Youth career
- Panthrakikos

Senior career*
Years	Team	Apps	(Gls)
1973–1981	Panthrakikos	140	(25)
1981–1995	Doxa Drama	256	(10)

Managerial career
- 1981–1995: Doxa Drama (player-coach)
- 1999–2001: Aris Photolivos
- 2002–2003: Pandramaikos
- 2003–2004: Prosotsani
- 2004–2006: Panthrakikos
- 2021: Doxa Drama
- * Club domestic league appearances and goals as of 20 August 2010

Kostas Vasilakakis (Greek: Κώστας Βασιλακάκης; born 27 March 1957) is a Greek football manager and former footballer. His career began in 1973 at the age of 16 when he signed a contract with Panthrakikos. He was transferred to Doxa Drama in 1981 and fought in Alpha Ethniki for thirteen years. He ended his career as footballer of Doxa Drama in 1995 at the age of 38.

== Career ==
=== As football player ===
Vasilakakis began his career as striker. He later changed football position and became established as a defensive midfielder and central defender. In Panthrakikos he played eight seasons – seven in the Beta Ethniki, one in Gamma Ethniki. Playing in the first level until 38 years old, from 1981 to 1995 he played thirteen seasons in the Alpha Ethniki (now Super League) and one season in the Beta Ethniki. Vasilakakis is leading the list of appearances of the players of Doxa Drama with 226+ (no data for 1981–82) appearances in Alpha Ethniki.
He was α leader on both teams.

=== As football manager ===
He was hired and worked at Panthrakikos F.C. as football manager from the summer of 2004 until 2008 (with the exception of the first half of the 2006–2007 season). He was the most successful football manager in the club's history. In four seasons he won the three most significant promotions, from Delta Ethniki to the Super League Greece.
As a football manager of Doxa Drama succeeded in promotion from Gamma Ethniki to Beta Ethniki in the 2008–2009 season.
In his coaching career he was coach of the following groups:

- 1999–2001 Aris Photolivos
- 2001–2003 Pandramaikos F.C.
- 2003–2004 Prosotsani
- 2004–2006 Panthrakikos F.C.
- 2006–2007 Doxa Drama F.C. and Panthrakikos F.C.
- 2007–2008 Panthrakikos F.C.
- 2008–2010 Doxa Drama F.C.
- 2010 Panthrakikos F.C.
- 2012- Kavala F.C.

== See also ==
- Football League (Greece)
- Doxa Drama F.C.
