= A.E. Karaiskakis F.C. =

Greek football club

Karaiskakis
- Full name: Αθλητική Ένωση Καραϊσκάκης Άρτας
- Nickname: Choriátes (Villagers)
- Founded: 1 September 2012; 13 years ago
- Dissolved: 2023; 3 years ago
- Ground: Municipal Agioi Anargiroi Stadium
- Capacity: 1,900

A.E. Karaiskakis Football Club (Greek: Α.Ε. Καραϊσκάκης) was a Greek professional football club based in Arta, Greece. The club founded in 2012 and their home ground was Municipal Agioi Anargiroi Stadium.

== History ==
=== Foundation and first years ===
The club was established in 2012, after the merger of AO Arta, Aetos Diasello and Omonoia Petra, and is currently competing in the 2nd tier of Greek football, the Super League Greece 2. In the 2014–15 Football League 2, despite leading the table for a big part of the season, and having the best attacking and defensive record of the group, scoring 60 and conceding just 14, Karaiskakis lost to AO Trikala on the last matchday with a score of 1–2, a result that led to the club missing out on promotion to Beta Ethniki.

==== 2015–16 season ====
The 2015–16 season for Karaiskakis started with an away victory of 1–2 at Farkadona. The first home match was against nearby Ethnikos Filippiada, and ended in a goalless draw. Karaiskakis played their first match at their official home on 25/10/2015 against Niki Volos. The game ended 2–1 in favour of Karaiskakis, who came back to win after being 0–1 down at half-time. On November 5, 2015, after disagreements in a meeting session, former coach, Sakis Papavasileiou, terminated his contract with the club. Three days later, the club announced the hiring of the 54 year old coach from Arta, Giannis Taprantzis. Having been in charge for only 3 games, Taprantzis left the club for personal reasons. After a few days, Giorgos Giannos became the club's new manager. The very next day after the hiring of Giannos, Karaiskakis defeated Pyrasos 4–0 at home. The first defeat of the season came against Aiginiakos on the 13th matchday, with a score of 3–1. On the final day of the first round, Karaiskakis defeated Rigas Feraios 2–1, coming back after conceding in the 42nd minute. That same year, Karaiskakis won for the first time in his history the FCA Arta's Cup.

=== Recent years ===
In September 2016, a joint announcement was made with the administration of the Renaissance Arta on the cooperation and common course of the two groups. The co-operation eventually did not materialize. At the end of the 2016–17 season, the team finished second in the third consecutive year. After the end of the championship, the team managed to win the Gamma Ethniki Cup 2016–17. As Cupid, they claimed with Irodotos the Super Cup of Amateur Football of Greece where they were defeated by 1–0.

=== Promotion to the Football League ===
In the summer of 2017, HFF initially decided to fill the gap of a team in the 2nd national with the third rounds of the 2016–17 Gamma Ethniki, provided that they will deposit a €300,000 guarantee. The only groups that did it were Karaiskakis and Doxa Drama. The barrage was set to be in Katerini. Finally, with a new decision, EPO abolished the barrage of climb. Following the appeal of Doxa Dramas against the decision of the HFF, the HFF Arbitration Court decided to become the barrage. After the withdrawal of Iraklis from the Football League, the match was canceled and the two teams were promoted to the Football League.

== Crest ==
The club's badge portrays the Greek Klepht/Armatolos from the Greek War of Independence, Georgios Karaiskakis.

== Supporters ==
Though formed in 2012, not only do Karaiskakis have a decent number of supporters, they have also created a fanbase. Members of this unofficial fanbase call themselves "Eagles", and gather in Gate 3.

=== Rivalries ===
Few seasons after Karaiskakis' establishment, a rivalry against the older club from Arta, Anagennisi, was born. In 2015, rumours were spread that the two clubs were on the verge of being merged. However, no official proposal has been made yet.

== Nicknames ==
A.E. Karaiskakis may sometimes be referred to as "Choriates" (Villagers). This nickname was first used from AO Trikala fans in the 2014–15 season, when they and Karaiskakis were the two favourites for promotion to the second tier, as a way of offending Karaiskakis fans for living in a small town like Arta. Supporters of Karaiskakis adopted this nickname, and used it in one of their banners for the match against Trikala. What was written on the banner was - (Welcome to the "village"), but didn't have any result as they lost 2–1.

== Honours ==
=== Domestic ===
==== Cup ====
- Gamma Ethniki Cup
  - Winners (1): 2016–17
- FCA Arta Cup
  - Winners (1): 2015–16

== Season by season ==
Season	Tier	Division	Place	Greek Cup
2021–2022	2	Super League 2	15th (R)	3R
2020–2021	2	Super League 2	11th	–
2019–2020	2	Super League 2	5th	4R
2018–2019	2	Football League	10th	3R
2017–2018	2	Football League	8th	–
2016–2017	3	Gamma Ethniki	2nd (P)	–
2015–2016	3	Gamma Ethniki	2nd	–
2014–2015	3	Gamma Ethniki	2nd	–
2013–2014	3	Gamma Ethniki	4th	–
2012–2013	4	Delta Ethniki	7th (P)	–

== Sponsorship ==
- Great Shirt Sponsor: Kotopoula Artas
- Official Sport Clothing Manufacturer: Macron
- Golden Sponsor: Epirus SA

== Records ==
Semi-Professional & Professional League games only:

- Record home attendance: 1900* spectators in 1-2 vs AO Trikala, 17 May 2015, Gamma Ethniki
- Biggest win: 7–0 vs Makrochori, 22 March 2015, Gamma Ethniki
- Biggest home wins: 7–0 vs Makrochori, 22 March 2015, Gamma Ethniki & 4–0 vs Aiginiakos, 21 November 2018, Football League
- Biggest away wins: 1-7 vs Anagennisi Perivolion, 10 February 2013, Delta Ethniki & 0–4 vs Sparta, 31 March 2019, Football League
- Biggest defeat: 7-0 vs Volos, 25 October 2018, Football League
- Biggest home defeat: 0-3 vs Ionikos, 7 April 2021 & 0–3 vs O.F. Ierapetra, 18 May 2021 Super League 2
- Biggest away defeat: 7–0 vs Volos, 25 October 2018, Football League
- Highest scoring games: 1-7 vs Anagennisi Perivolion, 10 February 2013 Delta Ethniki, 7–0 vs Makrochori, 22 March 2015 Gamma Ethniki & 0-7 vs Volos, 25 October 2018 Football League 2
- Longest winning run: 12 games, 22 January 2017 - 9 April 2017, Gamma Ethniki
- Longest unbeaten run: 24 games, 9 November 2014 - 10 May 2015, Gamma Ethniki
- Longest losing run: 5 games, 27 May 2018 - 11 November 2018, 2017-18 Football League - 2018-19 Football League
- Longest winless run: 11 games, 1 March 2020 - 14 February 2021, 2019-20 Super League 2 - 2020-21 Super League 2
