= 2020–21 Super League Greece 2 =

Super League Greece 2
- Season: 2020–21
- Dates: 16 January 2021 – 19 May 2021
- Champions: Ionikos
- Promoted: Ionikos
- Relegated: Panachaiki; Doxa Drama
- Top goalscorer: Matías Castro (15 goals)

The 2020–21 Super League 2 was the second season of the Super League 2, the second-tier Greek professional league for association football clubs, since restructuring of the Greek football league system.

Season's start has been delayed due to the COVID-19 second lockdown in Greece that began in November 2020 and started on 16 January 2021.

== Team changes ==
The following teams have changed division since the 2019–20 season.

=== To Super League Greece 2 ===
Promoted from Gamma Ethniki

- Diagoras Rodos
- Ierapetra
- Ionikos
- Trikala

Relegated from Super League

- Xanthi

==== From Super League Greece 2 ====
Promoted to Super League

- Apollon Smyrnis
- PAS Giannina

Relegated to Football League

- Apollon Pontus

Relegated to Gamma Ethniki

- Kerkyra
- Platanias

== Teams ==
Locations of the 2020–21 Super League 2 clubs

The following 12 clubs are competing in the Super League 2 during the 2020–21 season.

Team	City	Stadium	Capacity
Apollon Larissa	Larisa	AEL FC Arena	16,118
Chania	Chania	Perivolia Municipal Stadium	4,527
Diagoras Rodos	Rhodes	Diagoras Stadium	3,700
Doxa Drama	Drama	Doxa Drama Stadium	9,000
Ergotelis	Heraklion	Pankritio Stadium	26,240
O.F. Ierapetra	Ierapetra	Petros Vouzounerakis Stadium	3,000
Ionikos	Nikaia	Neapolis Public Stadium	6,000
Karaiskakis	Arta	Municipal Agioi Anargiroi Stadium	1,900
Levadiakos	Livadeia	Levadia Municipal Stadium	5,915
Panachaiki	Patra	Kostas Davourlis Stadium	11,321
Trikala	Trikala	Trikala Municipal Stadium	15,000
Xanthi	Xanthi	Xanthi FC Arena	7,244

== Personnel and sponsoring ==
Team	Manager	Captain	Kit manufacturer	Sponsor
Apollon Larissa	(Greece) Kostas Frantzeskos	(Greece) Konstantinos Chatzis	Nike	Psaragores Thalassa
Chania	(Greece) Nikos Papadopoulos	(Greece) Paschalis Kassos	Saller	Mare Magnum
Diagoras Rodos	(Greece) Sakis Theodosiadis	(Greece) Fotis Georgiou	Nike	Bread Factory
Doxa Drama	(Greece) Kostas Vasilakakis	(Greece) Alexandros Kontos	Macron	N/A
Ergotelis	(Greece) Giannis Taousianis	(Greece) Christos Batzios	Capelli	N/A
O.F. Ierapetra	(Greece) Timos Kavakas	(Greece) Christos Chrysofakis	Macron	N/A
Ionikos	(Greece) Dimitrios Spanos	(Greece) Giannis Gotsoulias	Nike	Car.gr
Karaiskakis	(Greece) Giannis Mangos	(Greece) Nikos Papanikou	Macron	Agrotikos Ptinotrofikos Syneterismos "Arta"
Levadiakos	(Greece) Sokratis Ofrydopoulos	(Greece) Zisis Karachalios	Kappa	Kompotis
Panachaiki	(Greece) Christos Karapitsos	(Greece) Nikos Kouskounas	Kappa	N/A
Trikala	(Greece) Soulis Papadopoulos	(Greece) Christos Niaros	Givova	Autodeal
Xanthi	(Greece) Babis Tennes	(Greece) Giannis Stathis	Joma	N/A

== League table ==
Pos	Team	Pld	W	D	L	GF	GA	GD	Pts	Qualification
1	Ionikos	22	14	5	3	35	19	+16	47	Qualification for the Play-off round
2	Levadiakos	22	11	8	3	32	12	+20	41	Qualification for the Play-off round
3	Xanthi	22	11	8	3	24	10	+14	41	Qualification for the Play-off round
4	Ergotelis	22	11	3	8	29	15	+14	36	Qualification for the Play-off round
5	Chania	22	9	8	5	18	13	+5	35	Qualification for the Play-off round
6	Diagoras Rodos	22	8	6	8	18	23	−5	30	Qualification for the Play-off round
7	Panachaiki	22	7	8	7	19	20	−1	29	Qualification for the Play-out round
8	Trikala	22	5	9	8	16	20	−4	24	Qualification for the Play-out round
9	Apollon Larissa	22	6	6	10	13	19	−6	24	Qualification for the Play-out round
10	Doxa Drama	22	6	3	13	17	37	−20	21	Qualification for the Play-out round
11	Karaiskakis	22	3	7	12	14	32	−18	16	Qualification for the Play-out round
12	O.F. Ierapetra	22	2	7	13	17	32	−15	13	Qualification for the Play-out round

Source: sl2fl.gr
Rules for classification: 1) Points; 2) Head-to-head points; 3) Head-to-head goal difference; 4) Goals scored; 5) Goals against; 6) Play-offs (neutral ground, only used if needed to decide teams for promotion or relegation).

=== Results ===
Home \ Away	APL	CHA	DIA	DOX	ERG	OFI	ION	KAR	LEV	PCH	TRI	XAN
Apollon Larissa	—	1–0	0–1	1–0	0–3	1–1	0–1	3–0	1–2	0–3	0–0	1–1
Chania	2–1	—	1–0	1–0	0–1	1–0	0–1	1–0	0–0	0–0	1–2	0–0
Diagoras Rodos	0–1	1–1	—	1–3	0–0	1–0	1–1	1–0	0–4	1–1	2–0	1–0
Doxa Drama	0–1	0–1	0–2	—	1–0	2–1	2–1	0–0	0–4	0–0	1–0	0–3
Ergotelis	1–0	0–1	2–0	6–0	—	4–0	0–1	0–1	0–1	1–0	2–3	2–1
O.F. Ierapetra	0–0	0–1	1–1	2–3	0–1	—	1–2	2–2	1–1	1–0	1–1	1–2
Ionikos	1–0	1–1	3–1	4–2	2–3	2–1	—	2–0	1–1	1–0	1–1	1–1
Karaiskakis	1–2	1–1	2–1	1–1	0–1	2–3	0–3	—	0–2	0–0	1–0	0–1
Levadiakos	0–0	1–1	0–0	2–1	1–0	1–0	1–2	4–0	—	3–0	0–0	1–1
Panachaiki	1–0	3–2	0–1	2–1	1–1	2–0	0–1	2–2	2–0	—	1–1	1–0
Trikala	1–0	0–2	0–1	3–0	0–0	0–0	2–3	1–0	1–3	0–0	—	0–0
Xanthi	0–0	0–0	2–0	1–0	1–0	2–1	1–0	1–1	1–0	4–0	1–0	—

Source: sl2fl.gr
Legend: Blue = home team win; Yellow = draw; Red = away team win.
For upcoming matches, an "a" indicates there is an article about the rivalry between the two participants.

== Play-off round ==
The top six teams from Regular season will meet once (5 matches per team) for places in 2021–22 Super League Greece as well as deciding the league champion.

Pos	Team	Pld	W	D	L	GF	GA	GD	Pts	Promotion or qualification	ION	XAN	LEV	ERG	CHA	DIA
1	Ionikos (C)	27	16	5	6	44	29	+15	53	Promotion to Super League	—	0–2	2–3	2–1	—	—
2	Xanthi (Q)	27	14	9	4	29	12	+17	51	Qualification for the Promotion play-offs	—	—	1–0	0–1	1–1	—
3	Levadiakos	27	14	8	5	42	16	+26	50		—	—	—	0–1	3–0	4–0
4	Ergotelis	27	15	3	9	37	18	+19	48		—	—	—	—	2–0	3–1
5	Chania	27	11	9	7	22	19	+3	42		1–0	—	—	—	—	2–0
6	Diagoras Rodos	27	8	6	13	22	38	−16	30		3–5	0–1	—	—	—	—

Source: sl2fl.gr
Rules for classification: 1) Points; 2) Head-to-head points (Regular season and play-off); 3) Head-to-head goal difference (Regular season and play-off); 4) Regular season position.
(C) Champions; (Q) Qualified for the phase indicated

== Play-out round ==
Pos	Team	Pld	W	D	L	GF	GA	GD	Pts	Relegation	PCH	TRI	APL	DOX	KAR	OFI
7	Panachaiki (R)	27	9	10	8	29	29	0	37	Relegation to Gamma Ethniki	—	1–0	1–1	1–2	—	—
8	Trikala	27	6	11	10	21	25	−4	29		—	—	3–1	1–1	0–1	—
9	Apollon Larissa	27	7	8	12	19	27	−8	29		—	—	—	0–2	2–2	1–0
10	Doxa Drama (R)	27	8	4	15	24	47	−23	28	Relegation to Gamma Ethniki	—	—	—	—	2–4	0–3
11	Karaiskakis	27	5	9	13	24	42	−18	24		3–3	—	—	—	—	0–3
12	O.F. Ierapetra	27	4	8	15	25	36	−11	20		2–3	0–0	—	—	—	—

Source: sl2fl.gr
Rules for classification: 1) Points; 2) Head-to-head points (Regular season and play-out); 3) Head-to-head goal difference (Regular season and play-out); 4) Regular season position.
(R) Relegated

== Top scorers ==
As of 16 May 2021

Rank	Player	Club	Goals
1	(Argentina) Matías Castro	Ionikos	15
2	(Greece) Georgios Manousakis	Ergotelis	10
3	(Montenegro) Veljko Batrović	Panachaiki	8
4	(Netherlands) Tyrone Conraad	Ergotelis	7
4	(Greece) Dimitrios Mavrias	Doxa Drama	7
6	(Brazil) Miguel Bianconi	Levadiakos	6
6	(Greece) Christos Aravidis	Panachaiki	6
6	(Greece) Nikos Kouskounas	Panachaiki	6
6	(Greece) Antonis Kapnidis	Xanthi	6
