= 2019–20 Super League Greece 2 =

Super League Greece 2
- Season: 2019–20
- Dates: 28 September 2019 – 22 June 2020
- Champions: PAS Giannina
- Promoted: PAS Giannina; Apollon Smyrnis
- Relegated: Platanias; Kerkyra; Apollon Pontus
- Matches: 120
- Goals: 325 (2.71 per match)
- Top goalscorer: Joseph Efford (11 goals)
- Biggest home win: Panachaiki 7–0 Apollon Pontus (10 March 2020)
- Biggest away win: Apollon Pontus 0–5 Apollon Smyrnis (26 January 2020); Apollon Pontus 1–6 PAS Giannina (9 February 2020)
- Highest scoring: Apollon Pontus 1–6 PAS Giannina (9 February 2020); Panachaiki 7–0 Apollon Pontus (10 March 2020)
- Longest winning run: PAS Giannina (6 matches)
- Longest unbeaten run: PAS Giannina (12 matches)
- Longest winless run: Kerkyra (16 matches)
- Longest losing run: Kerkyra (16 matches)
- All statistics correct as of 10 March 2020.

The 2019–20 Super League 2 was the first season of the Super League 2, the second-tier Greek professional league for association football clubs, since restructuring of the Greek football league system.

The exact system of conduct and how many teams will be promoted and how many will be relegated will be finalized in the summer when the final calls for professional bids are made public. It has been decided to hold Championship Round with the first 6 teams and Relegation Round with the last 6 teams of the regular season.

The league was suspended on 3 October after failing to reach an agreement with state broadcaster ERT. After reaching an agreement with state broadcaster ERT the league resumed on 25 October.

== Team allocation ==
From Super League

- Apollon Smyrnis
- Levadiakos
- PAS Giannina

From Football League

- Apollon Larissa
- Apollon Pontus
- Chania
- Doxa Drama
- Ergotelis
- Karaiskakis
- Kerkyra
- Panachaiki
- Platanias

== Teams ==
Locations of the 2019–20 Super League 2 clubs

The following 12 clubs are competing in the Super League 2 during the 2019–20 season.

Club	Location	Stadium	Capacity
Apollon Larissa	Larissa	Apollon Ground	3,000
Apollon Pontus	Thessaloniki	Kalamaria Stadium	6,500
Apollon Smyrnis	Athens	Georgios Kamaras Stadium	14,200
Chania	Chania	Perivolia Municipal Stadium	4,527
Doxa Drama	Drama	Doxa Drama Stadium	9,000
Ergotelis	Heraklion	Pankritio Stadium	26,240
Karaiskakis	Arta	Municipal Agioi Anargiroi Stadium	1,900
Kerkyra	Corfu	Kerkyra Stadium	3,000
Levadiakos	Livadeia	Levadia Municipal Stadium	5,915
Panachaiki	Patras	Kostas Davourlis Stadium	11,321
PAS Giannina	Ioannina	Zosimades Stadium	7,652
Platanias	Chania	Perivolia Municipal Stadium	4,527

== Personnel and sponsoring ==
Team	Manager	Captain	Kit manufacturer	Sponsor
Apollon Larissa	(Albania) Arjan Bellaj	(Greece) Konstantinos Chatzis	Zeus	N/A
Apollon Pontus	(Greece) Dimitris Kalaitzidis	(Greece) Dimitrios Amarantidis	Nike	N/A
Apollon Smyrnis	(Greece) Babis Tennes	(Greece) Michalis Kyrgias	Macron	N/A
Chania	(Greece) Alekos Vosniadis	(Greece) Alexis Seliniotakis	Saller	Mare Magnum
Doxa Drama	(Greece) Kostas Vasilakakis	(Albania) Orestis Menka	Macron	N/A
Ergotelis	(Greece) Giannis Taousianis	(Greece) Christos Batzios	Capelli	N/A
Karaiskakis	(Greece) Giorgos Petrakis	(Greece) Aristotelis Karagiannidis	Macron	Kotopoula Artas
Kerkyra	(Greece) Kostas Christoforakis	(Greece) Panagiotis Panagiotidis	Macron	N/A
Levadiakos	(Greece) Sotiris Antoniou	(Greece) Vangelis Mantzios	Legea	Kompotis
Panachaiki	(Greece) Sokratis Ofrydopoulos	(Canada) James Stamopoulos	Hummel	Westenergy
PAS Giannina	(Greece) Argiris Giannikis	(Greece) Apostolos Skondras	Joma	Car.gr
Platanias	(Greece) Giannis Tatsis	(Greece) Manolis Roussakis	Acerbis	Ergobeton

== League table ==
Pos	Team	Pld	W	D	L	GF	GA	GD	Pts	Promotion or relegation
1	PAS Giannina (C, P)	20	15	4	1	44	11	+33	49	Promotion to Super League
2	Apollon Smyrnis (P)	20	13	3	4	36	13	+23	42	Qualification for the Promotion play-offs
3	Chania	20	11	5	4	33	9	+24	38	
4	Levadiakos	20	11	5	4	27	15	+12	38	
5	Karaiskakis	20	9	4	7	32	29	+3	31	
6	Apollon Larissa	20	9	3	8	27	25	+2	30	
7	Ergotelis	20	9	2	9	31	33	−2	29	
8	Panachaiki	20	8	4	8	34	19	+15	28	
9	Platanias (R)	20	8	2	10	26	32	−6	26	Relegation to Gamma Ethniki
10	Doxa Drama	20	6	6	8	25	25	0	24	
11	Kerkyra (Note: Kerkyra has 3 points deducted, from the HFF.) (R)	20	1	0	19	6	52	−46	0	Relegation to Gamma Ethniki
12	Apollon Pontus (Note: Apollon Pontus has 6 points deducted, from the HFF.) (R)	20	1	0	19	5	61	−56	−3	Relegation to Football League

Source: sl2fl.gr
Rules for classification: 1) Points; 2) Head-to-head points; 3) Head-to-head goal difference; 4) Goals scored; 5) Goals against; 6) Play-offs (neutral ground, only used if needed to decide teams for promotion or relegation).
(C) Champions; (P) Promoted; (R) Relegated

=== Results ===
Home \ Away	APL	APP	APS	CHA	DOX	ERG	KAR	KER	LEV	PCH	PLA	PAS
Apollon Larissa	—	4–0	1–0	0–1	4–1	3–1	2–0	2–1	1–1	1–1	—	0–3
Apollon Pontus	0–3	—	0–5	0–4	0–1	1–3	1–3	1–0	—	0–3	0–2	1–6
Apollon Smyrnis	3–0	4–0	—	0–0	1–1	3–0	1–2	2–1	0–1	—	4–0	0–0
Chania	1–2	3–0 (Note: The game awarded a 3–0 w/o win to Chania.)	0–1	—	2–1	—	5–1	4–0	2–0	2–1	3–0	0–1
Doxa Drama	0–0	3–0 (Note: The game awarded a 3–0 w/o win to Doxa Drama.)	0–1	—	—	1–2	2–3	—	0–0	1–1	1–0	1–2
Ergotelis	1–0	—	0–2	1–0	2–2	—	4–2	2–1	1–3	2–1	1–2	1–2
Karaiskakis	2–0	2–1	1–2	0–0	2–2	3–0	—	3–0	1–1	2–0	4–2	—
Kerkyra	1–3	1–0	0–2	0–2	0–2	0–4	—	—	0–4	0–2	0–2	0–4
Levadiakos	2–0	2–0	—	0–0	3–2	1–0	1–1	1–0	—	2–1	1–0	1–2
Panachaiki	4–0	7–0	1–3	0–1	0–1	2–0	2–0	4–0	1–0	—	2–2	1–1
Platanias	2–1	2–0	0–1	1–1	1–3	2–4	1–0	4–0	3–2	—	—	0–2
PAS Giannina	—	3–0	5–1	1–1	1–0	2–2	2–0	4–1	0–1	1–0	2–0	—

Source: sl2fl.gr
Legend: Blue = home team win; Yellow = draw; Red = away team win.

== Top scorers ==
As of 10 March 2020

Rank	Player	Club	Goals
1	(United States) Joseph Efford	Ergotelis	11
2	(Brazil) Thomás	Apollon Smyrnis	10
2	(France) Jean-Baptiste Léo	PAS Giannina	10
2	(Croatia) Sandi Križman	PAS Giannina	10
2	(Greece) Giannis Loukinas	Platanias	10
6	(Greece) Zisis Chatzistravos	Karaiskakis	9
6	(Greece) Manolis Rovithis	Ergotelis	9
8	(Greece) Leonidas Kyvelidis	Karaiskakis	8
8	(Greece) Georgios Pamlidis	PAS Giannina	8
8	(Serbia) Marko Markovski	Apollon Smyrnis	8
11	(Greece) Nikolaos Ioannidis	Doxa Drama / Apollon Smyrnis	7
11	(Netherlands) Mark Sifneos	Apollon Larissa	7
13	(Greece) Savvas Siatravanis	Panachaiki	6
13	(Cyprus) Nestoras Mytidis	Panachaiki	6
13	(Greece) Dimitrios Mavrias	Panachaiki	6
13	(Greece) Vangelis Mantzios	Levadiakos	6
13	(Greece) Michalis Bastakos	Apollon Larissa	6
13	(Greece) Christos Rovas	Doxa Drama	6
