= Giouchtas F.C. =

Association football club in Greece

Giouchtas
- Full name: Αθλητικός Όμιλος Αρχανών “ο Γιούχτας” Athlitikós Ómilos Archanón “ó Gioúchtas” “Giouchtas” Athletic Club of Archanes
- Founded: 25 July 1957; 69 years ago
- Ground: Archanes National Stadium “Markomichelakio”
- Capacity: 500
- Chairman: Pavlos Tzortzoglou
- Manager: Anestis Anastasiadis
- League: Gamma Ethniki
- 2025–26: Gamma Ethniki (Group 6), 7th
Home colours	Away colours

A.O. Giouchtas F.C., short for Athlitikos Omilos Archanes “Giouchtas” (Greek: Αθλητικός Όμιλος Αρχανών “ο Γιούχτας”, translated Athletic Club of Archanes “Giouchtas”) and also known simply as Giouchtas, is a Greek football club, based in Archanes, Heraklion. The club is named after Mount Juktas, overlooking the town of Archanes. The club was founded in 1957 and its traditional colors are green and white. They currently compete in the Gamma Ethniki, the third tier of the Greek football league system, and host their home games in the Archanes National Stadium, known also as “Markomichelakio Stadium”. They have previously played for two seasons in the Gamma Ethniki during 2013-15.

== History ==
Giouchtas was established on July 25, 1957 as a means to spread sports in the Archanes region. The club eventually gained its own football ground after a local doctor, Michalis Markomichelakis donated 8,119 square meters of land for a stadium to be built. The venue was completed in 1962, and was named “Markomichelakio”, in honor of this generous donation.

Giouchtas have enjoyed relative success in regional competitions, having won the Heraklion FCA Cup on two consecutive occasions in 2009 and 2010. In 2007, Giouchtas managed a promotion to the Delta Ethniki, the fourth tier of the Greek football league system. They played in the fourth Division until 2013, when they earned promotion to the Gamma Ethniki for the first time in club history. They played two season in the third Division before being relegated in 2015.

In 2018, Giouchtas won their first Heraklion FCA Championship, managing a return to the Gamma Ethniki after a three-year absence.

The 2022–23 season is one of the most celebrated in Giouchtas' history, as the team secured first place in Group 5 of the Gamma Ethniki and earned a spot in the promotion play-offs. Although they failed to achieve promotion through the play-offs, they were ultimately promoted to Super League 2 as the replacement for Apollon Smyrnis, who failed to register for the league.

In the 2023–24 season, it competed in the Super League 2, where it failed to maintain its category, thus returning to the Gamma Ethniki.

== Honours ==
=== Domestic ===
- Third Division
  - Winners (1): 2022–23

=== Regional ===
- Heraklion FCA Championship
  - Winners (1): 2017−18
- Heraklion FCA Cup
  - Winners (3): 2008−09, 2009−10, 2024–25
