= O.F. Ierapetra F.C. =

Association football club in Greece

O. F. Ierapetra
- Full name: Όμιλος Φιλάθλων Ιεράπετρας; Ómilos Filáthlon Ierápetras (Ierapetra Fans' Club)
- Founded: 15 April 1970; 56 years ago
- Ground: Ierapetra Municipal Stadium «Petros Vouzounerakis»
- Capacity: 3,000
- Chairman: Giannis Malliotakis
- Manager: Antonis Kornaros
- League: Lasithi FCA First Division
- 2025–26: Lasithi FCA First Division, 5th
- Website: https://ofierapetras.blogspot.com
Home colours	Away colours

O.F. Ierapetra Football Club, short for Omilos Filathlon Ierapetra (Greek: Όμιλος Φιλάθλων Ιεράπετρας, translated: Ierapetra fans' club) and also simply known as OFI (Greek: ΟΦΙ − not to be confused with OFI Crete based in Heraklion, whose acronym is spelled differently (Greek: ΟΦΗ) in Greek), is a Greek professional football club based in Ierapetra, Lasithi, Crete, Greece. The club was established in 1970, and its traditional colors are black and white. It is the oldest and most successful football club representing the town of Ierapetra, hometown of one of the greatest Cretan players of all time: Petros Vouzounerakis, after whom the club's home ground is named (Ierapetra Municipal Stadium «Manos Frantzikinakis»).

== History ==
O.F. Ierapetra was founded in 1970 as a result of a merger between Thyella and Diagoras, the two clubs based in the town at the time. Throughout the 70s, O.F. Ierapetra played in the Pan-Hellenic Amateur Championship, which used to be the unofficial third tier of the Greek football league system. During the following decades, the club had a significant presence in the Delta Ethniki (4th level in the national league pyramid) of which they earned promotion to the Gamma Ethniki in 2006 after winning the Cretan Group championship title. For their first ever season in the Gamma Ethniki, the club failed to avoid relegation, largely due to inexperience, despite some memorable winning results against historic clubs such as Panachaiki.

In 2017, the club once again achieved promotion to the Gamma Ethniki after winning the Lasithi regional championship, where it still competes.

== Crest and colours ==
At the start of 2010−11 season, O.F. Ierapetra merged with the other two clubs representing the town of Ierapetra, Anagennisi and A.S. Ierapetra thus forming Ierapetra F.C. However at the end of the season, the merger broke up.

== Honours ==
=== National competitions ===
==== League titles ====
- Third Division
  - Winners (1): 2018–19
- Fourth Division
  - Winners (1): 2005–06
- Lasithi FCA Championship (Local Championship)
  - Winners (11): 1985–86, 1987–88, 1993–94, 1999–2000, 2000–01, 2009–10, 2010–11 (as I.F.C.), 2011–12, 2014–15, 2015–16, 2016–17

==== Cups ====
- Greek Amateur Cup
  - Winners (1): 2017–18
- Lasithi FCA Cup (Local Cup)
  - Winners (13): 1990–91, 1991–92, 1999–2000, 2000–01, 2005–06, 2007–08, 2009–10, 2013–14, 2014–15, 2015–16, 2016–17, 2017–18, 2018–19
- Lasithi FCA Super Cup
  - Winners (3): 2017, 2018, 2019
