= 2021–22 Ergotelis F.C. season =

Season of a Greek football club

Ergotelis
2021–22 season
- Chairman: Maged Samy
- Manager: Giannis Taousianis (2 September 2019 − 18 June 2021); Nikos Badimas (27 June 2021 − present)
- Stadium: Pankritio Stadium, Heraklion
- Super League 2: TBD
- Greek Cup: Fourth Round (eliminated by Niki Volos)
- Top goalscorer: League: TBD; All: 3 players (1 goal)
Home colours	Away colours

The 2021–22 season was Ergotelis' 92nd season in existence and 15th overall in the second tier of the Greek football league system, and 3rd after the foundation of the Super League 2. The contents of this article cover club activities from 1 June 2021 until 30 May 2022.

== Players ==
Summer acquisition
Winter acquisition

No.	Name	Nationality	Position (s)	Date of birth (age)	Signed from	Notes
Goalkeepers
34	Themistoklis Tselios	(Greece)	GK	6 October 1997 (29)	(Greece) Diagoras	
40	Giorgos Tzelepis	(Greece)	GK	12 November 1999 (27)	(Greece) Xanthi	
75	Nikos Psimopoulos	(Greece)	GK	19 June 2003 (23)	Youth system	
Defenders
3	Mostafa El Gabry	(Egypt)	CB	21 April 2001 (25)	(Egypt) Wadi Degla	On loan
4	Antonio Miço	(Albania) (Greece)	CB	27 January 2000 (26)	(Spain) Terrassa FC	
5	Nikos Peios	(Greece)	CB	17 June 1999 (27)	(Greece) Olympiacos U−20	
33	Giannis Theodorakis	(Greece)	CB	8 June 2001 (25)	Youth system	
80	Edison Kola	(Albania) (Greece)	CB	3 April 2001 (25)	Youth system	
89	Georgios Sarris	(Greece)	CB	9 August 1989 (37)	(Albania) Flamurtari	
18	Georgios Servilakis	(Greece)	LB	18 May 1997 (29)	(Greece) Thesprotos	
24	Stelios Pozatzidis	(Greece)	LB	34 July 1994 (32)	(Greece) Platanias	
2	Jeffrey Neral	(Netherlands)	RB / DM	9 December 1997 (28)	(Netherlands) Helmond Sport	
14	Paraskevas Doumanis	(Greece)	RB	30 October 2000 (26)	(Greece) Olympiacos U−19	
66	Youssef Ibrahim	(Egypt)	CF	14 August 2003 (23)	(Egypt) Wadi Degla	On loan
Midfielders
8	Christos Voutsas	(Greece)	DM	31 July 2001 (25)	(Netherlands) Willem II U−21	
6	Giannis Koutantos	(Greece)	AM	31 January 2000 (26)	(Greece) Episkopi	Loan return
20	Antonis Alexakis	(Greece)	CM	2 July 2001 (25)	Youth system	
23	Giannis Boutsakis	(Greece)	CM	8 February 1994 (32)	(Greece) Atsalenios	
	Antonis Deaskalakis	(Greece)	CM	23 June 2002 (24)	Youth system	
10	Antonis Bourselis (C)	(Greece)	AM	6 July 1994 (32)	(Greece) OFI	
17	Oresti Kacurri	(Albania)	AM	25 February 1998 (28)	Youth system	
61	Abdulsamed Abdullahi	(Somalia) (Netherlands)	LM	19 January 1997 (29)	(Netherlands) Den Bosch	
Forwards
28	Sotirios Kokkinis	(Greece) (Germany)	LW	11 July 2000 (26)	(Netherlands) Willem II U−21	
77	Hossam El Rayally	(Egypt)	LW	12 March 2001 (25)	(Egypt) Wadi Degla	On loan
27	Charles Kwateng	(Belgium) (Ghana)	RW	27 May 1997 (29)	(Belgium) Lierse	
7	Thanasis Kostanasios	(Greece)	CF	11 January 1999 (27)	(Greece) Olympiacos	
9	Themis Patrinos	(Greece)	CF	18 January 2001 (25)	Youth system	
11	Tyrone Conraad	(Netherlands)	CF	7 March 1997 (29)	(Netherlands) Kozakken Boys	
99	Abdallah Farrag	(Egypt)	CF	21 March 2001 (25)	(Egypt) Wadi Degla	On loan
	Stathis Kapouranis	(Greece)	CF	20 September 2001 (25)	Youth system	

=== The following players have departed in mid-season ===
Note: Flags indicate national team as has been defined under FIFA eligibility rules. Players and Managers may hold more than one non-FIFA nationality.

Head coach	Captain	Kit manufacturer	Shirt sponsor
(Greece) Nikos Badimas	(Greece) Antonis Bourselis	(United States) Capelli Sport	(Greece) Vitex

== Transfers ==
Winter Transfer Window

=== In ===
Squad #	Position	Player	Transferred from	Fee	Date	Ref
6	MF	(Greece) Giannis Koutantos	(Greece) Episkopi	Loan return	1 June 2021	
	FW	(Greece) Nektarios Azizi	(Greece) Almyros Gazi	Loan return	1 June 2021	
34	GK	(Greece) Themistoklis Tselios	(Greece) Diagoras	Free	6 July 2021	
8	MF	(Greece) Christos Voutsas	(Netherlands) Willem II U−21	Free	28 July 2021	
4	DF	(Albania) (Greece) Antonio Miço	(Spain) Terrassa FC	Free	29 July 2021	
77	FW	(Egypt) Hossam El Rayally	(Egypt) Wadi Degla	Loan	31 August 2021	
99	FW	(Egypt) Abdallah Farrag	(Egypt) Wadi Degla	Loan	31 August 2021	
66	DF	(Egypt) Youssef Ibrahim	(Egypt) Wadi Degla	Loan	31 August 2021	
3	DF	(Egypt) Mostafa El Gabry	(Egypt) Wadi Degla	Loan	31 August 2021	

==== Promoted from youth system ====
Squad #	Position	Player	Date	Signed Until	Ref
	MF	(Greece) Antonis Daskalakis	17 September 2021	30 May 2024	

==== Re-signings ====
Squad #	Position	Player	Date	Signed Until	Ref
10	MF	(Greece) Antonis Bourselis	29 June 2021	30 May 2023	
23	MF	(Greece) Giannis Boutsakis	29 June 2021	30 May 2023	
24	DF	(Greece) Stelios Pozatzidis	30 June 2021	30 May 2023	
27	FW	(Belgium) (Ghana) Charles Kwateng	30 June 2021	30 May 2023	
5	MF	(Greece) Nikos Peios	27 July 2021	30 May 2023	

=== Out ===
Position	Player	Transferred To	Fee	Date	Ref
FW	(Greece) Giorgos Manousakis	(Greece) Lamia	Free	23 June 2021	
DF	(Greece) Kyriakos Mazoulouxis	(Greece) Lamia	Free	23 June 2021	
DF	(Brazil) Arthur Bote	Free agent	Free	1 July 2021	
DF	(Greece) Christos Batzios	(Greece) Xanthi	Free	1 July 2021	
MF	(Greece) Ilias Tselios	(Greece) Xanthi	Free	8 July 2021	
GK	(Greece) Dimitrios Katsimitros	(Greece) Chania	Free	10 July 2021	
GK	(Greece) Nektarios Azizi	(Greece) Poros	Free	29 September 2021	

=== Transfer summary ===
Undisclosed fees are not included in the transfer totals.

Expenditure

Summer: ▼€0,000

Winter: ▼€0,000

Total: ▼€0,000

Income

Summer: ▲€0,000

Winter: ▲€0,000

Total: ▲€0,000

Net totals

Summer: ▲€0,000

Winter: ▲€0,000

Total: ▲€0,000

== Managerial changes ==
Outgoing manager	Manner of departure	Date of vacancy	Position in table	Incoming manager	Date of appointment
(Greece) Giannis Taousianis	Contract expired.	18 June 2021	--	(Greece) Nikos Badimas	27 June 2021

== Kit ==
2021−22

Supplier: Capelli
Sponsor(s): None

Home	Away

Source: ergotelis.gr

Variations

Friendlies

Supplier: Capelli
Sponsor(s): None

Friendlies #1

Source: ergotelis.gr

== Preseason and friendlies ==
=== Preseason friendlies ===
==== Part A ====
Win Draw Loss

13 August 2021 Friendly	Ergotelis (Greece)	3 − 0	(Greece) POA	Heraklion, Crete, Greece
18:00 EEST	Kola 35'; Voutsas 46'; Kwateng 56'	Report		Stadium: Pankritio Stadium

18 August 2021 Friendly	Ergotelis (Greece)	0 − 1	(Greece) Almyros Gazi	Heraklion, Crete, Greece
18:30 EEST		Report	Kourakis 87'	Stadium: Pankritio Stadium

==== 17th Markomichelakis Tournament ====
Win Draw Loss

21 August 2021 Friendly^{1}	Ergotelis (Greece)	2 − 0	(Greece) Anagennisi Ierapetra	Archanes, Crete, Greece
17:00	Tsamantiotis 9'; Voutsas 15'	Report		Stadium: National Archanes Stadium

21 August 2016 Friendly^{1}	Ergotelis (Greece)	2 – 0	(Greece) Giouchtas	Archanes, Crete, Greece
19:00	Kwateng 20'; Bourselis 35'	Report		Stadium: National Archanes Stadium

1. 45-minute friendly.

==== Part B ====
Win Draw Loss

25 August 2021 Friendly	AO Tympaki (Greece)	1 − 1	(Greece) Ergotelis	Tympaki, Crete, Greece
18:00 EEST	Kwateng 87' (pen.)	Report	Zafeiris 43'	Stadium: Tympaki Stadium

27 August 2021 Friendly	Ergotelis (Greece)	1 − 0	(Greece) OF Ierapetra	Heraklion, Crete, Greece
18:00 EEST	Voutsas 47'	Report		Stadium: Pankritio Stadium, Training Ground

3 September 2021 Friendly	OFI (Greece)	1 − 0	(Greece) Ergotelis	Heraklion, Crete, Greece
21:00 EEST	Marinakis 75'	Report		Stadium: Theodoros Vardinogiannis Stadium

10 September 2021 Friendly	Ergotelis (Greece)	1 − 1	(Greece) Chania	Heraklion, Crete, Greece
17:30 EEST	Kwateng 11' (pen.)	Report	Varkas 43'	Stadium: Pankritio Stadium

15 September 2021 Friendly	OF Ierapetra (Greece)	2 − 1	(Greece) Ergotelis	Ierapetra, Crete, Greece
17:30 EEST	Jiménez 52'; Toribio 81'	Report	Kostanasios 79' (pen.)	Stadium: Petros Vouzounerakis Stadium

== Competitions ==
=== Overview ===
Competition	Started round	Current position / round	Final position / round	First match	Last match
Super League 2	1	TBD	TBD	TBD	TBD
Greek Football Cup	Third Round	Fourth Round	Fourth Round	26 September 2021	6 October 2021

Last updated: 6 October 2021

== Super League 2 ==
=== Regular season ===
==== League table ====
Pos	Team	Pld	W	D	L	GF	GA	GD	Pts	Promotion, qualification or relegation (Note: AEK Athens B and Panathinaikos B are ineligible for promotion and relegation)
7	Episkopi	32	13	9	10	27	25	+2	48	
8	Egaleo	32	13	7	12	31	31	0	46	
9	Ergotelis (Note: Ergotelis was relegated to local championships because of financial problems.) (R)	32	11	7	14	23	32	−9	40	Relegation to Local Championships
10	O.F. Ierapetra	32	10	7	15	43	49	−6	37	
11	Irodotos	32	10	7	15	29	42	−13	37	

Source: sl2.gr
Rules for classification: 1) Points; 2) Head-to-head points; 3) Head-to-head goal difference; 4) Goals scored; 5) Goals against; 6) Play-offs (neutral ground, only used if needed to decide teams for promotion or relegation).
(R) Relegated

==== Results summary ====
Overall								Home						Away					
Pld	W	D	L	GF	GA	GD	Pts	W	D	L	GF	GA	GD	W	D	L	GF	GA	GD
0	0	0	0	0	0	0	0	0	0	0	0	0	0	0	0	0	0	0	0

Last updated: 1 July 2021.
Source: Competitive matches

==== Results by Round ====
Round	1	2	3	4	5	6	7	8	9	10	11	12	13	14	15	16	17	18	19	20	21	22	23	24	25	26	27	28	29	30	31	32	33	34
Ground	A	H	A	H	A	H	A	-	H	A	H	A	H	A	H	A	H	H	A	H	A	H	A	H	-	A	H	A	H	A	H	A	H	A
Result	L	W	W	D	L	W	L	-	D	W	D	L	L	L	W	W	W	L	L	W	D	W	D		-									
Position																																		

Updated to match(es) played on 9 March 2022. Source: footballleaguenews.gr
A = Away; H = Home; W = Win; D = Draw; L = Loss

==== Matches ====
Win Draw Loss Postponed

6 November 2021 1	Rodos	1 − 0	Ergotelis	Rhodes, Greece
14:45 EET	Makrydimitris 6'; N'Diaye (yellow card) 30'; Mingos (yellow card) 36'; Kapsalis (yellow card) 41'; Iliadis (yellow card) 80'	Report	Kacurri (yellow card) 9'; Peios (yellow card) 63'; Conraad (yellow card) 90+2'	Stadium: Diagoras Stadium; Referee: Aristidis Vatsios

14 November 2021 2	Ergotelis	1 − 0	Episkopi	Heraklion, Crete, Greece
15:00 EET	Kwateng 32' (pen.); Boutsakis (yellow card) 26'; Miço (yellow card) 73'; Bourselis (yellow card) 90+2'	Report	Karagiannis (yellow card) 2'; Gonçalves (yellow card) 80'	Stadium: Pankritio Stadium; Referee: Angelos Bakoyiannis

20 November 2021 3	Kifisia	1 − 2	Ergotelis	Kaisariani, Athens, Greece
15:00 EET	Gotovos (yellow card) 64'; Karagounis 70', (yellow card) 80'	Report	Conraad 17'; Sarris (yellow card) 38' (yellow-red card) 49'; El Rayally (yellow card) 73'; Peios (yellow card) 80'; Prionas 89' (o.g.); Tselios (yellow card) 90+1'	Stadium: Kaisariani Stadium; Referee: Fotis Polychronis

24 November 2021 4	Ergotelis	0 − 0	AEK B	Heraklion, Crete, Greece
15:00 EET	Voutsas (yellow card) 26'; Boutsakis (yellow card) 45+1'	Report	Christopoulos (yellow card) 30'; Babis (yellow card) 45+1'; García (yellow card) 90+1'; Šabanadžović (yellow card) 90+3'	Stadium: Pankritio Stadium; Referee: Matthaios Vournelis

27 November 2021 5	Kalamata	2 − 0	Ergotelis	Kalamata, Messenia, Greece
17:00 EET	Markovski 45+1', (yellow card) 45+1'; Anastasopoulos (yellow card) 45+1', (goal) 90+1'; Tsagalidis (yellow card) 52'; Konstantinopoulos (yellow card) 67'; Felype (yellow card) 75'	Report	Peios (yellow card) 3'; Sarris (yellow card) 72'; Kola (yellow card) 74'; Boutsakis (yellow card) 90'	Stadium: Kalamata Municipal Stadium; Referee: Konstantinos Andrianos

4 December 2021 6	Ergotelis	1 − 0	Panathinaikos B	Heraklion, Crete, Greece
17:00 EET	Voutsas 14', (yellow card) 27'; Pozatzidis (yellow card) 74'; Peios (yellow card) 88'	Report	Theocharis (yellow card) 38'	Stadium: Pankritio Stadium; Referee: Charalambos Tsoukalas

11 December 2021 7	Karaiskakis	3 − 2	Ergotelis	Arta, Greece
14:45 EET	Nguemechieu 20'; Nazim 28'; Rubanguka (yellow card) 65'; Stamatis 88' (pen.); Huanderson (yellow card) 90+1'	Report	Voutsas (yellow card) 32'; Conraad 47', 68'; Pozatzidis (yellow card) 49'; Miço (yellow card) 49'	Stadium: Agioi Anargiroi Municipal Stadium; Referee: Spyridon Nikolaou

19 December 2021 9	Ergotelis	0 − 0	Asteras Vlachioti	Heraklion, Crete, Greece
14:45 EET	Abdullahi (yellow card) 88'; Patrinos (yellow card) 90+2'	Report	Lamge (yellow card) 2'; Zaimi (yellow card) 72'	Stadium: Pankritio Stadium; Referee: Konstantinos Andrianos

12 January 2022 13	Ergotelis	1 − 3	OF Ierapetra	Heraklion, Crete, Greece
15:00 EET	Kostanasios 6'; Miço (yellow card) 82'	Report	Andereggen 2', 63'; Necul (yellow card) 12'; Vouho 36'	Stadium: Pankritio Stadium; Referee: Angelos Bakoyiannis

16 January 2022 14	Kallithea	3 − 2	Ergotelis	Kallithea, Attica, Greece
14:45 EET	Mounier 18', 45+2'; Rossi (yellow card) 26'; Kostikas 40', (yellow card) 74'; Demethryus (yellow card) 56'	Report	Kostanasios 27' (pen.); Bourselis 35'; Voutsas (yellow card) 44'	Stadium: Grigoris Lambrakis Stadium; Referee: Panagiotis Koukoulas

20 January 2022 10^{a}	Diagoras	0 − 2	Ergotelis	Rhodes, Greece
14:45 EET	Lampiris (yellow card) 42'; Giorgou (yellow card) 65'; Rougalas (yellow card) 73'	Report	Miço (yellow card) 72'; Kostanasios 66', (yellow card) 66'; Pozatzidis 90+3'	Stadium: Diagoras Stadium; Referee: Konstantinos Bairaktaris

23 January 2022 15	Ergotelis	1 − 0	Egaleo	Heraklion, Crete, Greece
14:45 EET	Kostanasios 58', (yellow card) 82'; Boutsakis (yellow card) 76'; Neral (yellow card) 85'; Peios (yellow card) 90+6'	Report	Kalyvas (yellow card) 14'; Laskaris (yellow card) 68'; Arnarellis (yellow card) 73'; Vlachos (yellow card) 90+6'	Stadium: Pankritio Stadium; Referee: Giorgos Koukourakis

30 January 2022 16	Irodotos	1 − 2	Ergotelis	Nea Alikarnassos, Heraklion, Greece
14:45 EET	Gjini 30', (yellow card) 90+3'; Argilesi (yellow card) 43'	Report	Peios 24'; Conraad (yellow card) 26', (goal) 46'; Abdullahi (yellow card) 38'; Tselios (yellow card) 59'; Patrinos (yellow card) 80'; El Rayally (red card) 85'	Stadium: Nea Alikarnassos Municipal Stadium; Referee: Andreas Vlachos

2 February 2021 11^{a}	Ergotelis	0 − 0	Chania	Heraklion, Crete, Greece
15:00 EET	Boutsakis (yellow card) 16'; Miço (yellow card) 34'; Voutsas (yellow card) 53'	Report	Panagiotoudis (yellow card) 43'; Nikolis (yellow card) 62'; Tsamouris (yellow card) 64'; Parano (yellow card) 68'	Stadium: Pankritio Stadium; Referee: Dimitrios Theocharis

5 February 2022 17	Ergotelis	1 − 0	Levadiakos	Heraklion, Crete, Greece
14:45 EET	Kostanasios 29' (pen.); Peios (yellow card) 33'; Doumanis (yellow card) 43'; Pozatzidis (yellow card) 79'	Report	Vrakas (yellow card) 11'; Vichos (yellow card) 64'; Doumtsios (yellow card) 66'; Nili (yellow card) 79'; Hammond (yellow card) 81'; Symelidis (yellow card) 90+1'	Stadium: Pankritio Stadium; Referee: Christos Vergetis

13 February 2022 18	Ergotelis	0 − 1	Rodos	Heraklion, Crete, Greece
14:45 EET	Kostanasios (yellow card) 42'; Miço (yellow card) 67'; Sarris (yellow card) 69'	Report	Soulaj 24', (yellow card) 45'; Kapsalis (yellow card) 29'; Marković (yellow card) 66'; Cháves (yellow card) 79'	Stadium: Pankritio Stadium; Referee: Petros Tsagarakis

16 February 2022 19	Episkopi	1 − 0	Ergotelis	Zakynthos, Greece
15:00 EET		Report		Stadium: Gallos Stadium

23 February 2022 12^{a}	Zakynthos	2 − 0	Ergotelis	Zakynthos, Greece
15:00 EET	Kitoko (yellow card) 25'; Lampoglou 58'; Chimeli 72' (pen.); Mendes (yellow card) 90+6'; Dasis (yellow card) 90+6'	Report	Kokkinis (yellow card) 48'; Tzelepis (yellow card) 90+6'; Conraad (yellow card) 90+6'	Stadium: Zakynthos Municipal Stadium; Referee: Grigorios Rigopoulos

a. Match postponed because of positive COVID-19 tests.

== Greek Cup ==
=== Third round ===
Home team	Score	Away team
P.A.O. Rouf	0 − 3	Ergotelis (Q)

==== Matches ====
Win Draw Loss

26 September 2021 Third Round	P.A.O. Rouf	0 − 3	Ergotelis	Nea Smyrni, Athens, Greece
16:00 EEST	Alexandropoulos (yellow card) 90'	Report	Voutsas 4'; Sarris 22'; Kostanasios 60'	Stadium: Nea Smyrni Stadium; Referee: Michalis Dimopoulos (West Attica)

=== Fourth round ===
Home team	Score	Away team
Niki Volos (Q)	2 − 0	Ergotelis

==== Matches ====
Win Draw Loss

6 October 2021 Fourth Round	Niki Volos	2 − 0	Ergotelis	Volos, Greece
16:00 EEST	Kyriakidis (yellow card) 11'; Panagiotidis (yellow card) 70'; Rojano 72'; Andreou 90'	Report	Peios (yellow card) 62'; Pozatzidis (yellow card) 69'	Stadium: Panthessaliko Stadium; Referee: Anastasios Christodoulou (Imathia)

== Statistics ==
=== Squad statistics ===
As of 6 October 2021

Appearances denote players in the starting lineup, with the numbers in parentheses denoting appearances as substitute.

No.	Name	Super League 2		Greek Cup		Total	
No.	Name	Apps	Goals	Apps	Goals	Apps	Goals
Goalkeepers
34	(Greece) Themistoklis Tselios	0	0	2	0	2	0
40	(Greece) Giorgos Tzelepis	0	0	0	0	0	0
75	(Greece) Nikos Psimopoulos	0	0	0	0	0	0
Defenders
2	(Netherlands) Jeffrey Neral	0	0	0 (1)	0	0 (1)	0
3	(Egypt) Mostafa El Gabry	0	0	0 (1)	0	0 (1)	0
4	(Albania) Antonio Mico	0	0	2	0	2	0
5	(Greece) Nikos Peios	0	0	1	0	1	0
18	(Greece) Georgios Servilakis	0	0	2	0	2	0
24	(Greece) Stelios Pozatzidis	0	0	2	0	2	0
26	(Greece) Paris Doumanis	0	0	0 (2)	0	0 (2)	0
33	(Greece) Giannis Theodorakis	0	0	0	0	0	0
66	(Egypt) Youssef Ibrahim	0	0	0 (1)	0	0 (1)	0
80	(Albania) Edison Kola	0	0	2	0	2	0
89	(Greece) Georgios Sarris	0	0	1	1	1	1
Midfielders
6	(Greece) Giannis Koutantos	0	0	0	0	0	0
8	(Greece) Christos Voutsas	0	0	2	1	2	1
10	(Greece) Antonis Bourselis	0	0	0 (1)	0	0 (1)	0
17	(Albania) Oresti Kacurri	0	0	2	0	2	0
20	(Greece) Antonis Alexakis	0	0	0	0	0	0
22	(Somalia) Abdulsamed Abdullahi	0	0	0	0	0	0
23	(Greece) Giannis Boutsakis	0	0	2	0	2	0
	(Greece) Antonis Daskalakis	0	0	0	0	0	0
Forwards
7	(Greece) Thanasis Kostanasios	0	0	2	1	2	1
9	(Greece) Themis Patrinos	0	0	0	0	0	0
11	(Netherlands) Tyrone Conraad	0	0	0	0	0	0
27	(Belgium) Charles Kwateng	0	0	2	0	2	0
28	(Greece) Sotirios Kokkinis	0	0	0	0	0	0
77	(Egypt) Hossam El Rayally	0	0	0	0	0	0
99	(Egypt) Abdallah Farrag	0	0	0 (2)	0	0 (2)	0
	(Greece) Stathis Kapouranis	0	0	0	0	0	0
Players transferred/loaned out during the season

=== Goal scorers ===
Player has departed in mid-season

No.	Pos.	Nation	Name	Super League 2	Greek Cup	Total
8	MF	(Greece)	Christos Voutsas	0	1	1
89	DF	(Greece)	Georgios Sarris	0	1	1
7	FW	(Greece)	Thanasis Kostanasios	0	1	1
TOTAL				0	3	0

Last updated: 26 September 2021
Source: Competitive matches

=== Disciplinary record ===
S	P	N	Name	Super League 2			Greek Cup			Total		
S	P	N	Name	Yellow card	Yellow-red card	Red card	Yellow card	Yellow-red card	Red card	Yellow card	Yellow-red card	Red card
24	DF	(Greece)	Stelios Pozatzidis	0	0	0	1	0	0	1	0	0
5	DF	(Greece)	Nikos Peios	0	0	0	1	0	0	1	0	0
TOTALS				0	0	0	2	0	0	2	0	0

Last updated: 6 October 2021
Source: Competitive matches
Ordered by (red card) , (yellow card) (yellow-red card) and (yellow card)
(yellow card) = Number of bookings; (yellow card) (yellow-red card) = Number of sending offs after a second yellow card; (red card) = Number of sending offs by a direct red card.

=== Injury record ===
N	P	Nat.	Name	Type	Status	Source	Match	Inj. Date	Ret. Date

- Player is injured
- Player has recovered from injury
Last updated: 1 July 2021
Source: Ergotelis FC
