= Nea Ionia =

Municipality in North Athens, Greece

Nea Ionia Νέα Ιωνία
- Municipality
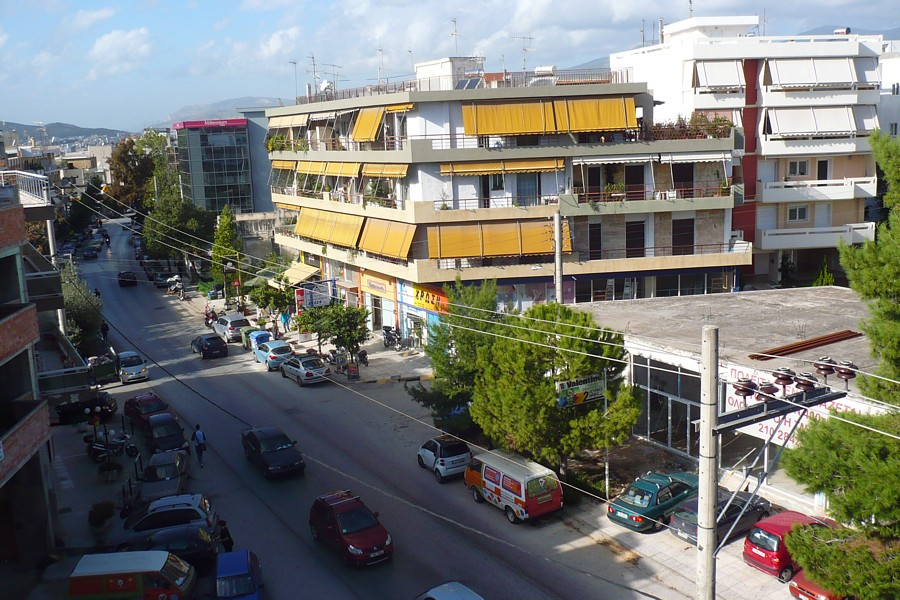

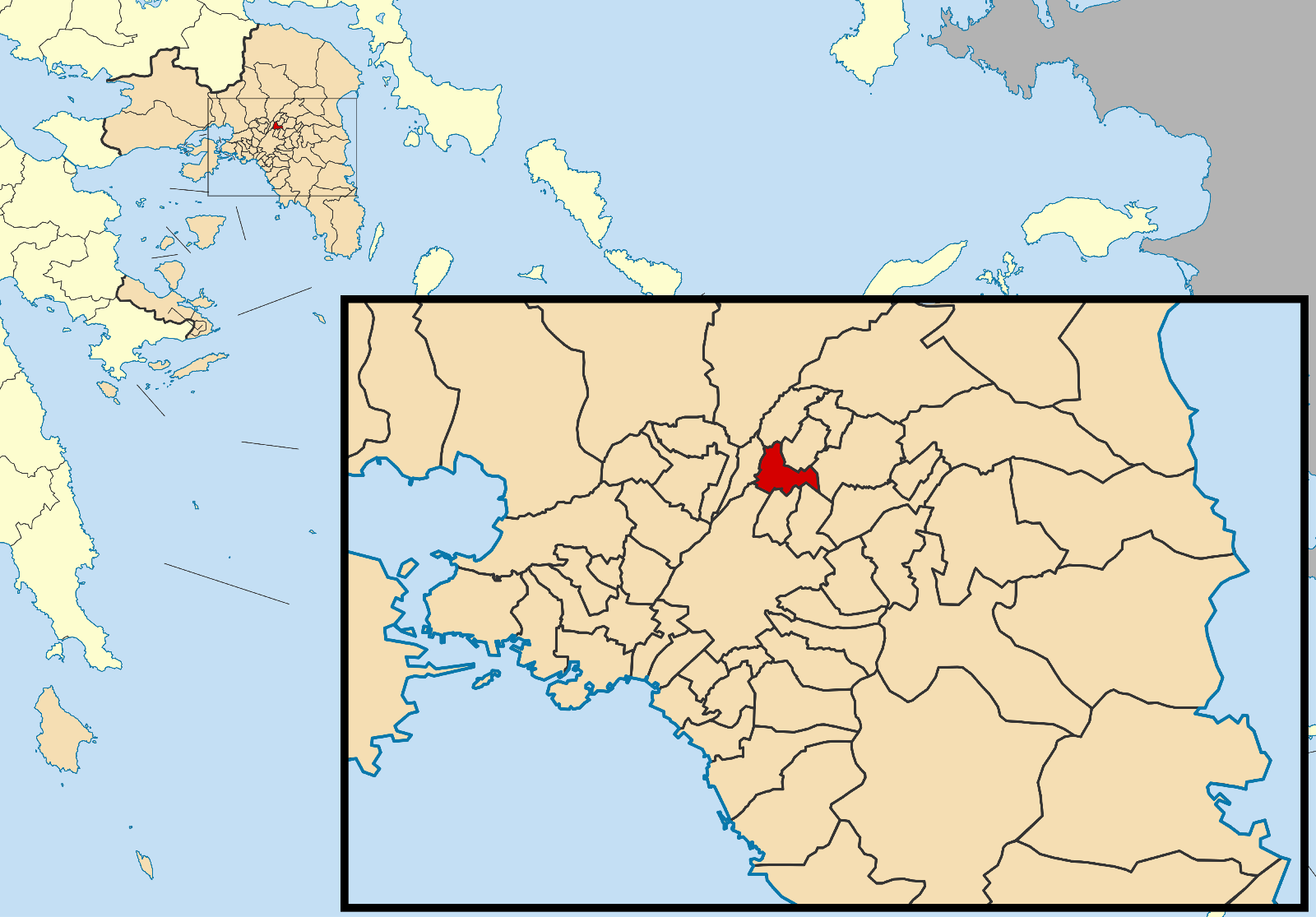

- Location within Greece
- Coordinates: 38°2′N 23°45′E
- Country: Greece
- Administrative region: Attica
- Regional unit: North Athens

Government
  - Mayor: Panagiotis Manouris (since 2023)

Area
  - Municipality: 4.421 km^{2} (1.707 sq mi)
- Elevation: 130 m (430 ft)

Population (2021)
  - Municipality: 64,611
  - Density: 14,610/km^{2} (37,850/sq mi)
- Time zone: UTC+2 (EET)
  - Summer (DST): UTC+3 (EEST)
- Postal code: 142 xx
- Area code: 210
- Vehicle registration: Z
- Website: neaionia.gr

Nea Ionia (Greek: Νέα Ιωνία, meaning New Ionia) is a town and a northern suburb of the Athens agglomeration, Greece, and a municipality of the Attica region. It was named after Ionia, the region in Anatolia from which many Greeks migrated in the 1920s as a part of the population exchange between Greece and Turkey. Many of the town families originated from the town of Alanya which is currently a part of Turkey.

Nea Ionia is 7 km northeast of Athens city centre. The municipality has an area of 4.421 km^{2}. It is served by three Line 1 metro stations: Nea Ionia, Pefkakia and Perissos.

== History ==
In the past, the area was named Podarades after Greek Revolution Hero of Albanian origin Ziliftar Poda and his followers, settled in this area. The modern settlement was built after the Greco-Turkish War (1919-22) and the subsequent population exchange between Greece and Turkey in 1923. That year refugees, mainly from Pisidia of Asia Minor, settled in the area. The new settlement was originally named Nea Pisidia. But later, due to the arrival of many refugees from other places of Ionia, the settlement was finally named Nea Ionia. The suburb developed rapidly thanks to carpet handicrafts. The refugees carried their expertise to Athens and opened important carpet handicrafts. This branch was the main economical source for the residents of Nea Ionia for many years. Nea Ionia gradually increased its population and expanded into a large area. The suburb is composed of 13 neighborhoods: Nea Ionia (Center), Perissos, Inepoli, Pefkakia, Saframpoli, Neapoli, Eleftheroupoli, Alsoupoli, Kalogreza, Lazarou, Anthrakorihia, Irini, Omorfoklissia and Palaiologou.

== Sports ==
Nea Ionia is the seat of the clubs O.F. Nea Ionia (Όμιλος Φιλάθλων Νέας Ιωνίας), club founded in 1926 with achievements in handball and Nea Ionia F.C. Other notable clubs are Eleftheroupoli F.C. with earlier presence in Beta Ethniki and DIKE.AS. Nea Ionia with current presence in A1 Ethniki handball. In the past there are also the important clubs PAO Saframpolis, PAO Kalogrezas and Ikaroi Neas Ionias which are inactive today.

Sport clubs based in Nea Ionia
Club	Founded	Sports	Achievements
O.F. Nea Ionia	1926	Handball	Panhellenic title in women handball
Eleftheroupoli F.C.	1929	Football	Earlier presence in Beta Ethniki
Nea Ionia F.C.	1939	Football	Presence in Gamma Ethniki
DIKE.AS. Nea Ionia	2004	Handball	Presence in A1 handball men

== Historical population ==
Year	Population
1981	59,202
1991	60,635
2001	66,017
2011	67,134
2021	64,611

== Notable residents ==
- Nikos Milioris (1896–1983) Greek author and senior military officer.
- Stelios Kazantzidis (1931–2001), Greek singer.
- Giota Lydia (1934), Greek Laïko singer.
- Nikos Xanthopoulos (1934-2023), Greek actor.
- Maria Farantouri (1947), Greek singer.
- Taki Tsan (1979), Greek rapper.
- Pantelis Pantelidis (1983-2016), Greek singer.
- Markos Kalovelonis (1994), Greek-Russian tennis player.

== See also ==
- List of municipalities of Attica
