= Georgios Iordanidis (defender) =

Greek football head coach

Georgios Iordanidis Γεώργιος Ιορδανίδης
Personal information
- Full name: Georgios Iordanidis
- Date of birth: 17 October 1989 (age 37)
- Place of birth: Cholargos, Athens, Greece
- Height: 1.85 m (6 ft 1 in)
- Position: Center-back

Youth career
- 1996–2001: Agia Paraskevi
- 2001: Glyka Nera
- 2004–2005: AEK Athens
- 2006–2007: Nea Ionia
- 2007: → Eleftheroupoli (loan)

Senior career*
| Years | Team | Apps | (Gls) |
| 2007–2008 | Eleftheroupoli | 2 | (0) |
| 2009 | PAO Kalyvia | 0 | (0) |
| 2010 | IFA Blackpool | 2 | (0) |
| 2011 | Sholing | 0 | (0) |
| 2012–2013 | Cosmos Giants | 5 | (0) |
| 2013 | QK Southampton | 2 | (0) |
| Total | | 11 | (0) |

Managerial career
- 2011–2013: QK Southampton (youth)
- 2012: NPO Earth (youth)
- 2013: Chamberlayne AWFC (assistant)
- 2016–2017: Greece Amputee FA
- 2019: Olympiacos Piraeus (youth)
- * Club domestic league appearances and goals as of 15:00, 27 April 2013 (UTC)

Georgios Iordanidis (Greek: Γεώργιος Ιορδανίδης, pronounced [ʝeˈorʝios iorðaˈniðis]; born 17 October 1989), also known as George I. Iordanidis, is a Greek professional football coach, former player, and author. He played as a centre-back during his football career and has written fiction for both children and adults, as well as a soccer training manual. He most recently served as head coach of the Greece Amputee Football Association, which is a member of the European Amputee Football Federation (EAFF).

== Early life, coaching career, and education ==
He was born in Athens into a middle-class household as the younger son of an auto electrician and his wife, a secondary school principal. He played senior-level football for Eleftheroupoli, PAO Kalyvia, IFA Blackpool, Sholing, Cosmos Giants, and QK Southampton, but several injuries terminated his career. In July 2014, he graduated with a Bachelor of Arts in Football Studies from Southampton Solent University, and earlier that year, he received the FA Level 2 coaching badge from the English FA. On February 12, 2016, the Greece Amputee FA appointed him as the national team's head coach. In his debut, the Greece Amputee FA drew 3–3 with AEK Futsal in a friendly game. In June 2016, he led the national team in its inaugural participation in the EAFF Amputee Football Week camp. In January 2017, he organized a charity event to collect food supplies for homeless people in Athens. On January 11, 2017, he resigned from his position due to military service obligations. In an effort to raise the awareness of young offenders on road culture and safety issues, RSI invited him to visit the Avlonas juvenile detention center on January 18, 2017, as an experiential guest. He has also worked as a talent identification scout for GKS Górnik Łęczna and Wisła Kraków in the Lotto Ekstraklasa for two straight seasons (2016–17 and 2017–18). In October 2022, he received his Master of Science in Football Coaching from the University of East London's Global Institute of Sport. In October 2023, he obtained the UEFA B coaching license from the Hellenic Football Federation. Apart from his native Greek, he speaks English, Spanish, and French to varying degrees of fluency.

"He is a bright lad; he likes our set-up, and he speaks ever such good English. He should fit in well."

— Dave Diaper, in Southern Daily Echo, Non-League Spotlight by Wendy Gee, on October 28, 2011.

== Career statistics ==
As of matches played in the 2013-14 football season

Appearances and goals by club, season and competition
| Club | Season | League | | | Cup | | Continental | | Other | | Total | |
| Club | Season | Division | Apps | Goals | Apps | Goals | Apps | Goals | Apps | Goals | Apps | Goals |
|---|---|---|---|---|---|---|---|---|---|---|---|---|
| Eleftheroupoli | 2007–08 | AFCA Second Division | 2 | 0 | 1 | 0 | — | | 2 (Note: Exhibition game against ACG Soccer Academy.) | 0 | 5 | 0 |
| PAO Kalyvia | 2009–10 | EAFCA Third Division | 0 | 0 | 0 | 0 | — | | 4 | 1 | 4 | 1 |
| IFA Blackpool | 2010–11 | Youth System | 2 | 0 | — | | — | | — | | 2 | 0 |
| Sholing | 2011–12 | EVO-STIK Southern League | 0 | 0 | 0 | 0 | — | | 1 (Note: Exhibition game against Eastleigh.) | 0 | 1 | 0 |
| Cosmos Giants | 2012–13 | Sunday League | 5 | 0 | — | | — | | — | | 5 | 0 |
| QK Southampton | 2013–14 | PUMA Engineering HPL | 2 | 0 | 0 | 0 | — | | — | | 2 | 0 |
| Career total | | | 11 | 0 | 1 | 0 | 0 | 0 | 7 | 1 | 19 | 1 |

== Managerial statistics ==
As of 22 July 2025

| Team | From | To | Tenure | Record | | | | | | | | Ref. |
| Team | From | To | Tenure | G | W | D | L | GF | GA | GD | Win % | Ref. |
|---|---|---|---|---|---|---|---|---|---|---|---|---|
| QK Southampton (youth) | 26 November 2011 | 4 May 2013 | 1 year, 5 months and 8 days | 28 | 16 | 3 | 9 | 90 | 54 | +36 | 57.14 | |
| NPO Earth (youth) | 18 June 2012 | 13 July 2012 | 25 days | 0 | 0 | 0 | 0 | 0 | 0 | +0 | — | |
| Greece Amputee FA | 12 February 2016 | 11 January 2017 | 10 months and 30 days | 5 | 2 | 1 | 2 | 9 | 6 | +3 | 40.00 | |
| Olympiacos Piraeus (youth) | 26 July 2019 | 27 July 2019 | 1 day | 0 | 0 | 0 | 0 | 0 | 0 | +0 | — | |
| Career totals | | | | 33 | 18 | 4 | 11 | 99 | 60 | +39 | 54.55 | |

== Honours ==
=== Manager ===
QK Southampton Youth

- Southampton & District Tyro Football League runner-up: 2012 (Division 5)

Greece Amputee FA

- Greece Amputee Football Association Charity Cup: 2017

== Popular culture ==
=== Clubs support ===
He is a supporter of Super League 1 club AEK Athens and an admirer of Primera División club Boca Juniors.

=== Relatives ===
The engineer, Alex Sinoyannis, who worked as a dynamic vehicle engineer for Team Penske No. 22 in the NASCAR Cup Series from 2013 to 2016, is his second cousin.

The referee, Alexandros Dimitropoulos, who officiated forty Super League 1 and seven Greek Cup matches from 2011 to 2016, is his half-first cousin. He has also served as a fourth official in twenty Super League 1 games and as a referee in twenty-seven Super League 2 games.

The football player, Konstantinos Sinoyannis, who played as a goalkeeper for Smyrnaikos Polygono, among others, was his great-uncle.

The basketball player Georgios Moschos, who played for Panellinios Athens, Iraklis Thessaloniki, and AEK Athens, and won the GBL five times, was his great-uncle-in-law.

The guitarist, songwriter, and composer Dimitris Sinoyannis, who has collaborated with top artists in the music industry (e.g., Goran Bregović, Thanos Mikroutsikos, Manolis Mitsias, George Dalaras, Haris Alexiou, Marinella, Dimitris Mitropanos, Vasilis Karras, and Vasilis Papakonstantinou), is his uncle.

The opera singer Meropi Jordano, née Iordanidou, who performed in Austria, Switzerland, and Germany, is his great-aunt.

=== Sport video games ===
He is featured as a scout for Wisła Kraków of the Lotto Ekstraklasa in the 2018 edition of the Football Manager simulation video game.

== Publications ==
The coach is the author of three works published via Kindle Direct Publishing and available through Amazon and international booksellers including Waterstones, Hatchards, Harvard Book Store, Magers & Quinn, McNally Jackson, Saxo.com, laFeltrinelli, bol.com, Adlibris, Falter, and Hugendubel.

- Iordanidis, George I. (2025). I kicked it just for fun... a football, a pinecone, and a soda can!. Athens, Greece: Kindle Direct Publishing. ISBN 9798269390093.
- Iordanidis, George I. (2025). Love Beyond Fate Beneath Anatolia's Chalky Mountain. Athens, Greece: Kindle Direct Publishing. ISBN 9798271914805.
- Iordanidis, George I. (2026). Nature’s Lessons: 25 Soccer Sessions for Youth and Adults. Athens, Greece: Kindle Direct Publishing. ISBN 9798251045109.
