= 2023 EAFF Nations League =

Tournament details
- Host country: Poland, France, Belgium, Scotland
- Dates: 16–18 June, 8–10 September, 6–8 October, 28–29 October
- Teams: 18
- Venues: 5 (in 5 host cities)

Final positions
- Champions: England (1st title)
- Runners-up: Turkey
- Third place: Poland
- Fourth place: Spain

Tournament statistics
- Matches played: 32
- Goals scored: 129 (4.03 per match)

The 2023 EAFF Nations League was the first edition of the biennial international competition of european amputee football national men's teams. It was organized by the European Amputee Football Federation (EAFF). The teams are divided into four divisions based on their ranking.

England national amputee football team won the title for the first time.

== Division A ==
Division A tournament was held in Kraków, Poland, on 16–18 June.

Team	Pld	W	D	L	GF	GA	GD	P
England	3	3	0	0	4	1	+3	9
Turkey	3	2	0	1	7	3	+4	6
Poland	3	1	0	2	7	5	+2	3
Spain (R)	3	0	0	3	0	9	−9	0

(R) Relegated

16 June 2023
Kraków
England	(England)	1 – 0	(Turkey)	Turkey
Kraków
Poland	(Poland)	4 – 0	(Spain)	Spain
17 June 2023
Kraków
Poland	(Poland)	1 – 2	(England)	England
Kraków
Turkey	(Turkey)	4 – 0	(Spain)	Spain
18 June 2023
Kraków
Spain	(Spain)	0 – 1	(England)	England
Kraków
Poland	(Poland)	2 – 3	(Turkey)	Turkey

== Division B ==
Division B tournament was held in Annecy and Rumilly, France, on 8–10 September.

Team	Pld	W	D	L	GF	GA	GD	P
Italy (P)	3	3	0	0	7	1	+6	9
Ireland	3	1	1	1	8	3	+5	4
France	3	1	1	1	5	3	+2	4
Germany	3	0	0	3	0	13	−13	0

(P) Promoted

8 September 2023
Annecy
France	(France)	1 – 1	(Republic of Ireland)	Ireland
Annecy
Germany	(Germany)	0 – 3	(Italy)	Italy
9 September 2023
Rumilly
Italy	(Italy)	2 – 1	(Republic of Ireland)	Ireland
Rumilly
France	(France)	4 – 0	(Germany)	Germany
10 September 2023
Annecy
France	(France)	0 – 2	(Italy)	Italy
Annecy
Germany	(Germany)	0 – 6	(Republic of Ireland)	Ireland

== Division C ==
Division C tournament was held in Blankenberge, Belgium between October 6–8.

Team	Pld	W	D	L	GF	GA	GD	P
Georgia (P)	4	2	2	0	10	3	+7	8
Ukraine	4	2	2	0	3	1	+2	8
Israel	4	1	3	0	9	6	+3	6
Greece (W)	4	0	2	2	3	6	-3	2
Belgium	4	0	1	3	1	10	−9	1

(P) Promoted; (W) Withdrawn for the next season

6 October 2023
Blankenberge
Belgium	(Belgium)	0 – 5	(Georgia (country))	Georgia
Blankenberge
Greece	(Greece)	1 – 2	(Ukraine)	Ukraine
Blankenberge
Israel	(Israel)	3 – 3	(Georgia (country))	Georgia
7 October 2023
Blankenberge
Belgium	(Belgium)	0 – 1	(Ukraine)	Ukraine
Blankenberge
Belgium	(Belgium)	1 – 4	(Israel)	Israel
Blankenberge
Greece	(Greece)	0 – 2	(Georgia (country))	Georgia
Blankenberge
Greece	(Greece)	2 – 2	(Israel)	Israel
8 October 2023
Blankenberge
Ukraine	(Ukraine)	0 – 0	(Georgia (country))	Georgia
Blankenberge
Ukraine	(Ukraine)	0 – 0	(Israel)	Israel
Blankenberge
Belgium	(Belgium)	0 – 0	(Greece)	Greece

== Division D ==
Division D tournament was held in Fife, Scotland on 28–29 October.

Team	Pld	W	D	L	GF	GA	GD	P
Netherlands (P)	4	4	0	0	36	0	+36	12
Azerbaijan (P)	4	3	0	1	19	6	+13	9
Scotland	4	2	0	2	7	13	-6	6
Kosovo	4	0	1	3	1	18	−17	1
Albania	4	0	1	3	2	28	-26	1

(P) Promoted

28 October 2023
Fife
Scotland	(Scotland)	2 – 0	(Kosovo)	Kosovo
Fife
Netherlands	(Netherlands)	5 – 0	(Azerbaijan)	Azerbaijan
Fife
Scotland	(Scotland)	4 – 1	(Albania)	Albania
Fife
Azerbaijan	(Azerbaijan)	6 – 0	(Kosovo)	Kosovo
Fife
Albania	(Albania)	0 – 15	(Netherlands)	Netherlands
29 October 2023
Fife
Kosovo	(Kosovo)	1 – 1	(Albania)	Albania
Fife
Scotland	(Scotland)	1 – 5	(Azerbaijan)	Azerbaijan
Fife
Albania	(Albania)	0 – 8	(Azerbaijan)	Azerbaijan
Fife
Kosovo	(Kosovo)	0 – 9	(Netherlands)	Netherlands
Fife
Scotland	(Scotland)	0 – 7	(Netherlands)	Netherlands

== Rankings ==
Rank	Team
1	England
2	Turkey
3	Poland
4	Spain
5	Italy
6	Ireland
7	France
8	Germany
9	Georgia
10	Ukraine
11	Israel
12	Greece
13	Belgium
14	Netherlands
15	Azerbaijan
16	Scotland
17	Kosovo
18	Albania

2023 EAFF Nations League
(England)
England
First title
