= Giota Lydia =

Greek singer

- Birth name: Panagiota Mandaraki
- Born: 24 February 1934 (age 91)
- Genres: Laïko
- Occupation: Singer
- Years active: 1950–present

Giota Lydia (Yiota Lydia)( Greek: Γιώτα Λύδια)( Panagiota Mandaraki(Greek: Παναγιώτα Μανταράκη), 24 February 1934 in Nea Ionia, Greece) is a Greek Laïko singer.
