= Charles Kwateng =

Belgian footballer

Personal information
- Date of birth: 27 May 1997 (age 29)
- Place of birth: Liège, Belgium
- Height: 1.66 m (5 ft 5 1/2 in)
- Position: Forward

Youth career
- 2013–2014: JMG Academy Lier
- 2014–2017: Lierse

Senior career*
Years	Team	Apps	(Gls)
2017–2018	Lierse	0	(0)
2017–2018	→ Mandel United (loan)	21	(1)
2018–2022	Ergotelis	46	(7)
2022	→ Veria (loan)		
- * Club domestic league appearances and goals as of 18 June 2022

Charles Kwateng (born 27 May 1997) is a Belgian professional footballer who plays as a forward.

== Club career ==
Kwateng began his career at JMG Academy in Lier, before being transferred to Belgian top-tier side Lierse in 2014 at the age of 17. He made four appearances in the Belgian First Division B European play-offs during the 2016–17 season and was subsequently loaned out to Belgian Second Amateur Division Mandel United in July 2017.

In July 2018, after Lierse filed for bankruptcy, Kwateng moved to Greece, signing for Football League side Ergotelis.

On 1 July 2021, he extended his contract with Ergotelis for two more years.

== Career statistics ==
=== Club ===
As of 26 September 2021.

Club	Season	League			Cup		Other		Total	
Club	Season	Division	Apps	Goals	Apps	Goals	Apps	Goals	Apps	Goals
Lierse	2016–17	Proximus League	0	0	0	0	4 (Note: Appearances in Belgian First Division European play-offs)	0	4	0
Lierse	2017–18	Proximus League	0	0	0	0	0	0	0	0
Lierse	Total		0	0	0	0	4	0	4	0
Mandel United (loan)	2017–18	Belgian Second Amateur Division	21	1	1 (Note: Appearances in the Belgian Cup)	0	—		22	1
Mandel United (loan)	Total		21	1	1	0	—		22	1
Ergotelis	2018–19	Football League	21	3	4 (Note: Appearances in the Greek Cup)	0	—		25	3
Ergotelis	2019–20	Super League 2	8	3	1	0	—		10	3
Ergotelis	2020–21	Super League 2	10	0	—		—		10	0
Ergotelis	2021–22	Super League 2	0	0	1	0	—		1	0
Total			39	6	6	0	—		45	6
Career total			60	7	7	0	4	0	71	7
