= P.A.O. Kalyvia F.C. =

P.A.O. Kalyvia
- Full name: Podosfairikos Athlitikos Omilos Kalyvia; Ποδοσφαιρικός Αθλητικός Όμιλος Καλυβίων
- Founded: 14 May 1979; 47 years ago
- Ground: Kalyvia Municipal Stadium
- Capacity: 500
- Chairman: Nikolaos Bourmas
- Head Coach: Georgios Tsompanakis
- League: East Attica Second Division
- 2025–26: East Attica Third Division, 3rd (promoted)
- Website: http://paokalivionfc.gr/
Home colours	Away colours

P.A.O. Kalyvia Football Club (Greek: Π.Α.Ο. Καλυβίων; Ποδοσφαιρικός Αθλητικός Όμιλος Καλυβίων; Podosfairikos Athlitikos Omilos Kalyvion), is a Greek football club that was established in 1979 at Kalyvia Thorikou.

== History ==
=== Establishment ===
PAO Kalyvion's earliest recorded activity dates back to 1952. In October 1964, the club played a friendly match against Panathinaikos in an effort to strengthen relations between the two sides. During the early 1960s, the club adopted green as its official color and was renamed Apollon Kalyvion. The team’s colors changed several times in the following years until the club was formally established in 1979. Between 1981 and 2003, PAO Kalyvion competed in the Athens FCA leagues. The club earned promotion from the Third Division to the Second Division twice—first in the 1991–92 season and again in 2000–01. In 2003, the club was transferred to the East Attica football divisions and achieved promotion to the East Attica First Division during the 2003–04 season.

=== Youth development ===
The club has developed a strong reputation for producing talented young players through its academy system. Over the years, several academy graduates have progressed to higher levels of professional football, earning transfers to larger domestic clubs. The most recent notable transfer was that of Thomas Lappas, who joined AEK Athens academy after emerging through the club's youth ranks. His move further highlighted the club's continued commitment to youth development and its ability to nurture players capable of competing at the highest level of Greek football.

== Honours ==
P.A.O. Kalyvion Youth F.C. honours
Type	Competition	Titles	Winners	Runners-up
Regional	U10 East Attica FCA Youth League	1	2010–11	

- record
- ^{S} Shared record

Tournaments:

- Gothia Cup

Participation (1): Gothenburg, Sweden

- Garons Cup

Participation (1): Garons, France

== Players ==
=== Current squad ===
As of 10 October 2026.

Note: Flags indicate national team as defined under FIFA eligibility rules; some limited exceptions apply. Players may hold more than one non-FIFA nationality.

No.	Pos.	Nation	Player
1	GK	GRE	ΛΟΥΚΑΣ ΦΙΛΙΠΠΟΥ
2	GK	GRE	ΚΩΝΣΤΑΝΤΙΝΟΣ ΛΟΥΠΕΤΗΣ
3	GK	GRE	ΗΛΙΑΣ ΚΩΝΣΤΑΝΤΑΤΟΣ
4	GK	GRE	ΑΓΓΕΛΟΣ ΔΕΣΠΟ
5	DF	GRE	ΙΑΣΩΝΑΣ ΨΑΡΡΟΣ
6	DF	GRE	ΑΠΟΣΤΟΛΟΣ ΧΑΤΖΗΣΤΕΦΑΝΟΥ
7	DF	GRE	ΕΠΑΜΕΙΝΩΝΔΑΣ ΛΑΠΠΑΣ
8	DF	GRE	ΚΩΝΣΤΑΝΤΙΝΟΣ ΓΕΩΡΓΙΟΥ
9	DF	GRE	ΝΙΚΟΛΑΣ ΜΕΤΑΪ
10	DF	GRE	ΝΙΚΟΛΑΟΣ ΧΑΡΔΑΛΙΑΣ
11	DF	GRE	ΕΥΘΥΜΙΟΣ ΤΣΟΜΠΑΝΑΚΗΣ
12	DF	GRE	ΓΕΩΡΓΙΟΣ ΤΖΑΝΙΔΗΣ
13	MF	GRE	ΠΑΝΑΓΙΩΤΗΣ ΜΠΟΥΡΜΑΣ
14	MF	GRE	ΙΩΑΝΝΗΣ ΑΓΓΕΛΟΠΟΥΛΟΣ
15	MF	GRE	ΒΑΣΙΛΕΙΟΣ ΓΩΓΟΣ
16	MF	GRE	ΚΥΡΙΑΚΟΣ ΔΗΜΗΤΡΕΛΗΣ

No.	Pos.	Nation	Player
17	MF	GRE	ΣΠΥΡΙΔΩΝ ΣΑΡΡΗΣ
18	MF	GRE	ΘΕΟΦΑΝΗΣ ΤΣΟΜΠΑΝΑΚΗΣ
19	MF	GRE	ΚΩΝΣΤΑΝΤΙΝΟΣ ΒΥΤΙΝΙΩΤΗΣ
20	MF	GRE	ΔΗΜΗΤΡΙΟΣ ΚΑΡΖΗΣ
21	MF	GRE	ΧΡΗΣΤΟΣ ΑΣΗΜΑΚΟΠΟΥΛΟΣ
22	MF	GRE	ΑΓΓΕΛΟΣ ΧΑΤΖΗΣΤΕΦΑΝΟΥ
23	MF	GRE	ΦΑΜΠΙΑΝ ΚΑΣΑΙ
24	MF	GRE	ΧΑΡΑΛΑΜΠΟΣ ΛΑΖΑΡΙΔΗΣ
25	FW	GRE	ΝΙΚΟΛΑΟΣ ΜΑΚΡΙΔΗΣ
26	FW	GRE	ΛΑΜΠΡΟΣ ΝΤΟΚΟΣ
27	FW	GRE	ΑΓΓΕΛΟΣ ΤΣΟΜΠΑΙ
28	FW	GRE	ΣΤΑΜΑΤΙΟΣ ΑΛΛΑΓΙΑΝΝΗΣ
29	FW	GRE	ΓΕΩΡΓΙΟΣ ΣΥΚΙΑΝΑΚΗΣ
30	FW	GRE	ΑΝΤΩΝΙΟΣ ΤΣΙΚΛΕΑΣ
31	FW	GRE	ΣΤΥΛΙΑΝΟΣ ΛΑΖΟΣ
32	FW	GRE	ΙΩΑΝΝΗΣ ΚΟΥΛΟΥΡΗΣ

== List of former players ==
Greece

- (Greece) Georgios Iordanidis (2009)
- (Greece) Marios Anastopoulos (2017–18)
- (Greece) Alexandros Chaidos (2016–19)
- (Greece) Christos Botsivalis (2018–19)
- (Greece) Vasilios Dounis (2018–19)
- (Greece) (Germany) Zisis Naoum (2020–22)
- (Greece) (Kazakhstan) Giannis Afouxenidis (2024–25)
- (Greece) (United States) Ionas Papaioannou (2023–24)

Rest of Europe

- (Albania) (Greece) Antonio Miço (2015–16)
- (Albania) (Greece) Henri Dogani (2018–19)
- (Belgium) Mikael Dieu (2024–25)

== Personnel ==
=== Current Board ===
As of 29 May 2025.

Position	Staff
Chairman	(Greece) Nikolaos Mpourmas
Vice Chairman A	(Greece) Christos Mpoutsis
Vice Chairman B	(Greece) Constantinos Philippou
Treasurer	(Greece) Soso Papadeli
Secretary	(Greece) Aliki Theochari
Board Member	(Greece) Georgios Psarros
Board Member	(Greece) Georgios Tsanis
Board Member	(Greece) Georgios Molvalis
Board Member	(Greece) Philippe Liapis
Board Member	(Greece) Georgios Koufadis
Board Member	(Greece) Taisia
Board Member	(Greece) Lysandros Sarris
