= 2025 EAFF Nations League =

Tournament details
- Host country: Turkey, Spain, Azerbaijan, Romania
- Dates: 12–14 September, 26–28 September, 17–19 October, 31 October – 2 November
- Teams: 18
- Venues: 4 (in 4 host cities)

Final positions
- Champions: Poland (1st title)
- Runners-up: Turkey
- Third place: England
- Fourth place: Italy

Tournament statistics
- Matches played: 32
- Goals scored: 117 (3.66 per match)

The 2025 EAFF Nations League is the second edition of the biennial international competition of european amputee football national men's teams. The teams are divided into four divisions based on their 2023 EAFF Nations League rankings.

Poland national amputee football team won the title for the first time.

== Division A ==
Division A tournament was held in Trabzon, Turkey between September 12–14.

Team	Pld	W	D	L	GF	GA	GD	P
Poland	3	2	1	0	10	5	+5	7
Turkey	3	2	0	1	12	5	+7	6
England	3	1	1	1	4	7	-3	4
Italy (R)	3	0	0	3	1	10	−9	0

(R) Relegated

12 September 2025
Trabzon
Turkey	(Turkey)	5 – 0	(Italy)	Italy
Trabzon
Poland	(Poland)	2 – 2	(England)	England
13 September 2025
Trabzon
England	(England)	1 – 0	(Italy)	Italy
Trabzon
Turkey	(Turkey)	2 – 4	(Poland)	Poland
14 September 2025
Trabzon
Turkey	(Turkey)	5 – 1	(England)	England
Trabzon
Italy	(Italy)	1 – 4	(Poland)	Poland

== Division B ==
Division B tournament was held in Avila, Spain between September 26–28.

Team	Pld	W	D	L	GF	GA	GD	P
Spain (P)	4	4	0	0	13	0	+13	12
France	4	2	1	1	4	2	+2	7
Ireland	4	2	0	2	5	4	+1	6
Georgia	4	1	0	3	3	11	-8	3
Germany (R)	4	0	1	3	2	10	−8	1

(P) Promoted; (R) Relegated

26 September 2025
Avila
Spain	(Spain)	4 – 0	(Germany)	Germany
Avila
France	(France)	2 – 0	(Republic of Ireland)	Ireland
Avila
Georgia	(Georgia (country))	3 – 2	(Germany)	Germany
27 September 2025
Avila
Ireland	(Republic of Ireland)	2 – 0	(Georgia (country))	Georgia
Avila
Spain	(Spain)	2 – 0	(France)	France
Avila
Ireland	(Republic of Ireland)	3 – 0	(Germany)	Germany
Avila
France	(France)	2 – 0	(Georgia (country))	Georgia
28 September 2025
Avila
Spain	(Spain)	5 – 0	(Georgia (country))	Georgia
Avila
Germany	(Germany)	0 – 0	(France)	France
Avila
Spain	(Spain)	2 – 0	(Republic of Ireland)	Ireland

== Division C ==
Division C tournament was held in Baku, Azerbaijan between October 17–19.

Team	Pld	W	D	L	GF	GA	GD	P
Ukraine (P)	4	3	0	1	9	4	+5	9
Israel	4	2	2	0	7	0	+7	8
Azerbaijan	4	2	1	1	5	3	+2	7
Netherlands	4	1	1	2	6	3	+3	4
Belgium (R)	4	0	0	4	0	17	-17	0

(P) Promoted; (R) Relegated

17 October 2025
Baku
13:00 GMT+4	Azerbaijan	(Azerbaijan)	3 – 0	(Belgium)	Belgium
Baku
15:00 GMT+4	Israel	(Israel)	2 – 0	(Ukraine)	Ukraine
Baku
17:00 GMT+4	Netherlands	(Netherlands)	5 – 0	(Belgium)	Belgium
18 October 2025
Baku
11:00 GMT+4	Ukraine	(Ukraine)	2 – 1	(Netherlands)	Netherlands
Baku
13:00 GMT+4	Azerbaijan	(Azerbaijan)	0 – 0	(Israel)	Israel
Baku
15:00 GMT+4	Ukraine	(Ukraine)	4 – 0	(Belgium)	Belgium
Baku
17:00 GMT+4	Israel	(Israel)	0 – 0	(Netherlands)	Netherlands
19 October 2025
Baku
11:00 GMT+4	Azerbaijan	(Azerbaijan)	1 – 0	(Netherlands)	Netherlands
Baku
15:00 GMT+4	Belgium	(Belgium)	0 – 5	(Israel)	Israel
Baku
17:00 GMT+4	Azerbaijan	(Azerbaijan)	1 – 3	(Ukraine)	Ukraine

== Division D ==
Division D tournament was held in Bucharest, Romania between October 31 – November 2.

Team	Pld	W	D	L	GF	GA	GD	P
Scotland (P)	3	3	0	0	20	0	+20	9
Romania	3	2	0	1	10	5	+5	6
Kosovo	3	1	0	2	6	7	-1	3
Albania	3	0	0	3	0	24	-24	0

(P) Promoted

31 October 2025
Bucharest
13:00 GMT+3	Romania	(Romania)	7 – 0	(Albania)	Albania
Bucharest
15:00 GMT+3	Kosovo	(Kosovo)	0 – 4	(Scotland)	Scotland
1 November 2025
Bucharest
13:00 GMT+3	Romania	(Romania)	3 – 1	(Kosovo)	Kosovo
Bucharest
15:00 GMT+3	Scotland	(Scotland)	12 – 0	(Albania)	Albania
2 November 2025
Bucharest
13:00 GMT+3	Albania	(Albania)	0 – 5	(Kosovo)	Kosovo
Bucharest
15:00 GMT+3	Romania	(Romania)	0 – 4	(Scotland)	Scotland

== Rankings ==
Rank	Team
1	Poland
2	Turkey
3	England
4	Italy
5	Spain
6	France
7	Ireland
8	Georgia
9	Germany
10	Ukraine
11	Israel
12	Azerbaijan
13	Netherlands
14	Belgium
15	Scotland
16	Romania
17	Kosovo
18	Albania

2025 EAFF Nations League
(Poland)
Poland
First title
