= Pantelis Pantelidis =

Musical artist (1983-2016)

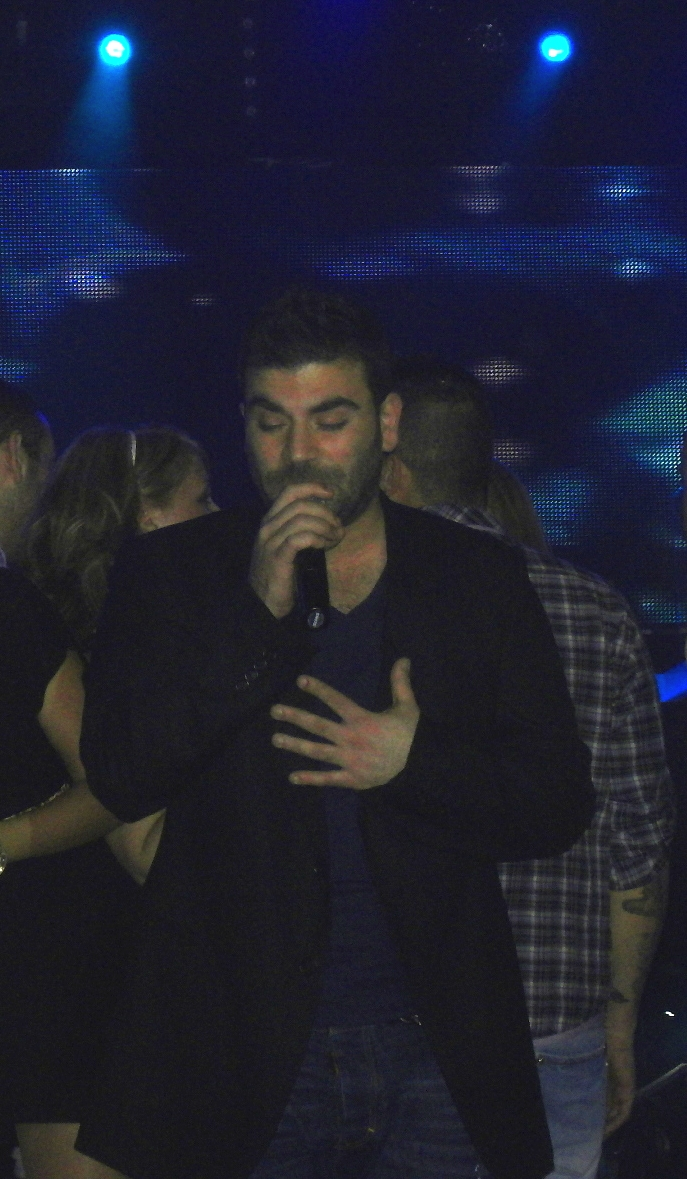
- Pantelis Pantelidis during a performance

Background information
- Also known as: Pantelos (Παντέλος)
- Born: Παντελής Παντελίδης; 23 November 1983; Nea Ionia, Greece
- Origin: Nea Ionia, Greece
- Died: 18 February 2016 (aged 32) Vouliagmenis Avenue, Elliniko, Greece
- Genre: Laïko
- Occupations: Singer; composer; lyricist
- Instruments: Vocals; acoustic guitar
- Years active: 2012–2016
- Label: Minos EMI

Pantelis Pantelidis (Παντελής Παντελίδης; 23 November 1983 – 18 February 2016) was a Greek singer, music composer and lyricist in the laïko genre. He was a self-taught guitarist and had previously served as a non-commissioned officer in the Hellenic Navy. He became widely known through videos of his own songs on YouTube and began his professional music career in 2012. He died at the age of 32 in a road accident in southern Athens.

== Biography ==
Pantelidis was born in Nea Ionia on 23 November 1983. His mother's family came from Agrinio, while his father's family had roots in the Isparta region of Asia Minor.

He served as a non-commissioned officer in the Hellenic Navy, but left the service to pursue a music career. He was self-taught as both a guitarist and songwriter.

== Career ==
Before signing a recording contract, Pantelidis performed for several years in small music clubs and made informal recordings of his own songs. His friends began uploading the recordings to YouTube, where they gradually attracted a growing audience.

In February 2012, a video of Pantelidis performing his original song "Den Tairiazete Sou Leo" with an acoustic guitar surpassed one million views and led to a recording contract with Minos EMI. His debut album, Alkoolikes I Nihtes, was released later that year and was certified double platinum.

Between 2012 and 2015, Pantelidis released four studio albums. He also collaborated and performed with Greek artists including Vasilis Karras, Despina Vandi, Paola and Giorgos Mazonakis.

== Death ==
On 18 February 2016, Pantelidis was killed after the vehicle in which he was travelling left the road and struck a crash barrier on Vouliagmenis Avenue in Elliniko, Athens. He was taken to a hospital in Voula, where he was pronounced dead at the age of 32. Two women travelling in the vehicle survived but suffered serious injuries.

Pantelidis's family subsequently disputed the identity of the driver. In December 2025, in civil proceedings concerning compensation for the two passengers, the Athens Court of Appeal ruled that Pantelidis had been driving and rejected the family's counterclaim. The court also found the two passengers 50 per cent contributorily negligent because they had entered a vehicle with an intoxicated driver.

== Discography ==
Pantelidis released four studio albums between 2012 and 2015. Several compilation albums and one live album were released after his death.

=== Studio albums ===
Year	Title	Label
2012	Alkoolikes I Nihtes	Minos EMI
2013	Ouranio Toxo Pou Tou Lipane 2 Hromata	Minos EMI
2014	Panselinos Ke Kati – Is-Pnoi [A' Meros]	Minos EMI
2015	Panselinos Ke Kati – Ek-Pnoi [B' Meros]	Minos EMI

=== Compilation albums ===
Year	Title	Label
2016	Gia Pada	Minos EMI
2018	Ah Ke Na 'Xera Pou Na 'Se	Minos EMI
2020	Tsigaro kai Fotia (Τσιγάρο και Φωτιά)	UMG Recordings
2021	Pame Gi Alla	UMG Recordings
2022	Pantelis Sto Repeat	UMG Recordings

=== Live albums ===
Year	Title	Label
2024	Live Apo To Fantasia	Minos EMI

== Posthumously released recordings ==
Several previously unreleased recordings were issued after Pantelidis's death. The song "Tha Zo", written and composed by Pantelidis, was recorded by the singer Amaryllis.

Contemporary reports noted the rapid online response to several of these recordings. "Alli Mia Efkeria" surpassed 100,000 views shortly after it was uploaded and received more than 1.18 million views in less than 48 hours. "Karavia Sto Vitho" passed 100,000 views within its first few hours and, according to contemporary reports, exceeded one million views within 24 hours.

By February 2017, "Thimamai" had spent 16 consecutive weeks at number one on the Greek radio airplay chart and had surpassed 24 million views on YouTube. By the end of January 2018, "Na 'Se Kala" had received 5.5 million views, while the video for Amaryllis's recording of "Tha Zo" was approaching three million. "Pali Pali" received more than 920,000 views within four days of release and reached number one on YouTube's Greek trending chart.

The following figures are rounded view counts for the official YouTube videos, last checked on 25 August 2026.

Release date	Title	Performer	YouTube views
26 June 2016	"Thimamai" (Θυμάμαι; "I Remember")	Pantelis Pantelidis	Approximately 39 million
14 December 2016	"Alli Mia Efkeria" (Άλλη Μια Ευκαιρία; "One More Chance")	Pantelis Pantelidis	Approximately 33 million
18 February 2017	"Karavia Sto Vitho" (Καράβια Στο Βυθό; "Ships at the Bottom")	Pantelis Pantelidis	Approximately 21 million
27 October 2017	"Tha Zo" (Θα Ζω; "I Will Live")	Amaryllis	Approximately 4.5 million
1 December 2017	"Na 'Se Kala" (Να ’σαι Καλά; "Be Well")	Pantelis Pantelidis	Approximately 11 million
25 May 2018	"Pali Pali" (Πάλι Πάλι; "Again and Again")	Pantelis Pantelidis	Approximately 11 million
20 December 2018	"Kane Ta Panta Apopse" (Κάνε Τα Πάντα Απόψε; "Do Everything Tonight")	Pantelis Pantelidis	Approximately 6.8 million
20 December 2018	"Ah Ke Na 'Xera Pou Na 'Se" (Αχ Και Να ’Ξερα Πού Να ’σαι; "If Only I Knew Where You Were")	Pantelis Pantelidis	Approximately 3.8 million

The seven posthumously released Pantelidis recordings listed in the table were included, together with the previously released song "Tis Kardias Mou To Grammeno", on the eight-track 2018 album Ah Ke Na 'Xera Pou Na 'Se. In November 2024, Minos EMI released Live Apo To Fantasia, featuring a concert recording made at the Fantasia club in 2016.

== Songs written for other performers ==
Pantelidis also wrote songs recorded by other performers.

Year	Song	Performer
2013	"Xeirotera" (Χειρότερα)	Eleni Hatzidou
2013	"Tora Sernese" (Τώρα Σέρνεσαι)	Paola
2014	"Diatages" (Διαταγές)	Amaryllis
2014	"Narkopedio I Zoi Mou" (Ναρκοπέδιο η Ζωή Μου)	Giannis Ploutarhos
2015	"O Kainourios Erotas Sou" (Ο Καινούριος Έρωτάς Σου)	Eirini Papadopoulou
2025	"Dos' Mou Ligo Oxygono" (Δωσ' Μου Λίγο Οξυγόνο)	Konstantinos Pantelidis

== Songs dedicated to Pantelidis ==
Following Pantelidis's death, other Greek and Cypriot performers dedicated both commercially released songs and independent recordings to him. Eleven days after his death, Stelios Zisos (Στέλιος Ζήσος) recorded the self-written and self-composed song "Pantelis" (Παντελής). Zisos described it as a tribute created with sadness, respect and love. In 2016, Kostas Mirovalis (Κώστας Μυρόβαλης) uploaded another independent tribute, "Ohto kai Pente" (Οχτώ και Πέντε; "Eight Hours and Five Minutes"), to his channel.

Cypriot singer Stavros Konstantinou released "Sta Asteria Ekane Premiera" (Στα Αστέρια Έκανε Πρεμιέρα; "A Premiere Among the Stars") in June 2016. The song recounts Pantelidis's life and departure. Konstantinou composed the music and Rafail Efstathiou wrote the lyrics.

In late 2016, "Tragoudao Tis Nychtes Panteli" (Τραγουδάω τις νύχτες Παντελή; "I Sing at Night, Panteli") appeared on Giorgos Tsalikis's album Kryfto. In September 2017, Evros Antoniou also released it through GABI Music as his own single featuring Tsalikis. Antoniou composed the music and co-wrote the lyrics with Tsalikis; the song directly addresses the deceased Pantelidis.

In January 2017, media outlets also published an untitled song composed by STAN about ten months after Pantelidis's death to honour his memory. It was presented as a personal farewell to a close friend.

On 1 March 2017, Kostas Ageris released "Telos (Mono Pantelos)" (Τέλος (Μόνο Παντέλος); "End (Only Pantelos)"), for which he wrote both the music and lyrics. The chorus uses the chant "Μόνο Παντέλος" ("Only Pantelos") associated with Pantelidis's fans. Ageris said he was inspired by fans chanting the phrase during his performances and dedicated the song to them and to Pantelidis's memory. The music video was also conceived as a tribute; the band members appear dressed in black in Pantelidis's memory.

Another form of tribute was Nasos Karakostas's song "Eisai 'O' kai Legesai" (Είσαι «Ο» και λέγεσαι), released by GABI Music in 2017. Karakostas later explicitly stated that he had written the song for Pantelidis, whom he described as a source of inspiration. He had uploaded the original home recording to his channel as "Ta Elege o Pantelis" (Τα έλεγε ο Παντελής; "Pantelis Said It"), while the official music video carried the later title "Eisai 'O' kai Legesai". The lyrics are constructed as a network of references to Pantelidis's work; among other things, they paraphrase the song "Synodevomai" (Συνοδεύομαι), the line "Ola Einai Sto Myalo" (Όλα είναι στο μυαλό) from "Lioma Se Gremo", and the title "Tis Kardias Mou To Grammeno" (Της Καρδιάς Μου Το Γραμμένο).

For the seventh anniversary of Pantelidis's death, Patras musician Giorgos Arvanitis (Γιώργος Αρβανίτης) released his own song "Panteli Pantelidi" (Παντελή Παντελίδη) in February 2023. Arvanitis wrote both the music and lyrics, which recall Pantelidis's beginnings with a guitar, his voice and his songs.

== Awards and nominations ==
Year	Category	Nominated work	Result
2013	Best New Artist	Pantelis Pantelidis	Won
2014	Best Video MAD Greekz	"Oniro Zo"	Won
2015	Best Male Artist – Adult	Pantelis Pantelidis	Won
2015	Best Video MAD Greekz	"Ginetai"	Won
2016	Best Male Artist – Adult	Pantelis Pantelidis	Won (posthumous)
2017	Song of the Year	"Thimamai"	Won (posthumous)
2018	Song of the Year	"Karavia Sto Vitho"	Nominated (posthumous)
2026	Song of the Year – Digital	"Isos Isoun Kiria"	Nominated (posthumous)
2026	Song of the Year – Laïko	"Isos Isoun Kiria"	Nominated (posthumous)

== Unreleased material ==
Shortly after Pantelidis's death, Greek media reported that approximately 200 files containing unreleased songs had been found on his mobile phone and handed to his family. Reports at the time noted that not all of the material had been professionally recorded or intended for commercial release.

Several acoustic and live recordings circulated online under unofficial titles, including:

- "Ase Me Na Nioso Tin Anapnoi Sou"
- "Athina"
- "Egina Skia"
- "Ego Ime Edo"
- "Irtha Ego Na Ta Gamiso Ola"
- "Sta Katechomena"
- "Ki Ego Sta Matia Sou Miden"
- "Ligo Chrono Zitises"
- "Me Eiches Brosta Sou"
- "Michani Tou Chronou"
- "Monos Mou"
- "O Alitis Sou"
- "O Trelos"
- "Prokalese Me"
- "Sagineftiki Apati"
- "Simadia Sto Laimo Sou"
- "Sou 'Gine To S' Agapo Sinithia"

The existence of an online recording does not in itself indicate that a commercial release was announced. In January 2025, Pantelidis's brother Konstantinos said that he was recording one previously unreleased Pantelis song and that further songs remained in the family archive. The song was subsequently released in 2025 as "Dos' Mou Ligo Oxygono", performed by Konstantinos Pantelidis.

== Links ==
=== External links ===
- Pantelis Pantelidis at Discogs
- Official YouTube channel
