= Eleftheroupoli F.C. =

Eleftheroupoli
- Full name: Athlitiki Enosi Eleftheroupoleos (Athletic Union of Eleftheroupoli)
- Nickname: Κιτρινόμαυροι (Yellow-Blacks)
- Founded: 1929; 97 years ago; (as Enosi Eleftheroupoli); 1934; 92 years ago; (as AE Eleftheroupoli); 1937; 89 years ago; (as AE Eleftheroupoli Elpida); 1961; 65 years ago; (as Eleftheroupoli Nea Ionia); 1962; 64 years ago; (as AE Eleftheroupoli); 1967; 59 years ago; (as Elpida Nea Ionia); 1975; 51 years ago; (as AE Eleftheroupoli)
- Ground: Municipal Stadium of Nea Ionia
- Capacity: 3,000
- Chairman: Ntora Kourtelesi
- Head Coach: Tasos Andriotis
- League: Athens FCA Second Division
- 2025–26: Athens FCA Second Division, 12th
- Website: Official website
Home colours	Away colours

Eleftheroupoli F.C., officially known as A.E. Eleftheroupoli (Greek: Αθλητική Ένωση Ελευθερουπόλεως, Athlitiki Enosi Eleftheroupoleos), the "Athletic Union of Eleftheroupoli", is a Greek association football club based in Nea Ionia, a suburban town in the Athens prefecture, Greece. The club currently competes in the Athens Second Division.

== History ==
The 1932–33 municipal championship winners

Eleftheroupoli is one of the oldest football clubs in Greece, and it was founded by Greek refugees from Asia Minor (A. Neofytou, L. Dimitropoulos, A. Konstantinidis, N. Nikolaou, Ch. Theodorou, L. Konstantinidis, Th. Kiriakou, A. Nikolaou, G. Stefanidis, D. Kountouris, P. Tsakonas, and P. Tevekelis). The archives of the country's newspapers, some originating from 1926, provide insights into a club referred to as Enosi Eleftheroupoli. The inception of the football department occurred in 1929, laying the foundation for its future development. In the year 1934, the club took a significant step by merging with the football clubs Aris and Dafni Nea Ionia, subsequently adopting the name Athlitiki Enosi Eleftheroupoli. In 1937, following a period of six years, the club joined forces with Elpida Nea Ionia, leading to the establishment of a reformed organization called AE Eleftheroupoli Elpida. In 1961, the football club merged with AE Nea Ionia, creating a more competitive team aimed at excelling in the second division. The subsequent year witnessed the dissolution of the merger between the two clubs, primarily driven by numerous disagreements regarding the club's organizational structure. The year 1967 saw, once again, the club forced to merge with AE Nea Ionia, ultimately leading to the creation of Elpida Nea Ionia as a consequence of the junta regime's influence. After the dissolution of the military junta in Greece, the club was re-established and adopted the name Athlitiki Enosi Eleftheroupoli. The team managed to win the local municipality championship three times from 1932 to 1935 and was recognized by the court of Athens as an official club. The club gained many new fans due to that success. In 1939, the club was recognized by the Hellenic Football Federation and the Athens Football Clubs Association, while at the same time, it competed in the local third division. Moreover, it took part in the national second division, known at the time as Beta Ethniki, for a duration of two football seasons during the early 1960s. Over the years, the club's reputation deteriorated due to its perennial presence in the regional leagues. The club produced many talented players, such as Stelios Skevofilakas, Stelios Panagiotidis, Georgios Magiras, Emmanouil Kountouris, Konstantinos Mavridopoulos, Ioannis Vlantis, Georgios Sevastiadis, Athanasios Mitilinaios, Tryfon Tzanetis, Mario Mitaj, and others, who later went on to play for more prominent football clubs in Greece and abroad. Eleftheroupoli's player A. Papadopoulos died while defending Greece during World War II.

== Stadium ==
The municipal stadium located in Nea Ionia serves as the home ground for the Eleftheroupoli football club, and it was built in 1962. The stadium's main access point is located along Olympias Street. In 2004, the entire stadium underwent significant renovations, including the installation of a state-of-the-art turf system on the pitch. It is important to acknowledge that the upgrade of the dressing rooms was accomplished solely in 2007. In 2015, the construction of the new facilities and stands was entirely funded by the government of Greece. Additionally, this stadium acts as the primary venue for A.O. Nea Ionia and P.A.O. Alsoupoli football clubs, playing a significant role in the community's sports culture. In August 2024, the local government funded the renovation of the stadium's track and the upgrade of the floodlights.

At the beginning of 1932, many significant matches of the club were held at AEK Stadium. This was largely attributed to the insufficient resources of local authorities and the overwhelming number of teams within the municipality of Nea Ionia, which hindered the establishment of a suitable facility for the local football clubs.

Part of the dramatic film 'The Striker with Number 9', directed by Pantelis Voulgaris, was filmed in this stadium.

== Supporters ==
The club's fan base stems from the descendants of the 6,000 Asia Minor refugees who were selected to settle in the region during the population exchange between Greece and Turkey in 1922.

== Honours ==
Eleftheroupoli F.C. honours
Type	Competition	Titles	Winners	Runners-up	Third place	Ref.
Domestic	Beta Ethniki (Second-tier)	0			1962 (Southern Group A)	
Regional	Athens FCA Second Division	0		1960–61		
Regional	Athens FCA Third Division	5	1948–49, 1981–82, 1989–90, 1991–92, 2005–06			
Local	Nea Ionia First Division	3	1934, 1937, 1938			
Local	Nea Ionia Second Division	2	1933, 1936			

- record
- ^{S} Shared record

== Domestic performance ==
=== Season by season in the higher divisions ===
Season	Category	Position	Points	GF \ GA	Cup	Ref.
1962	Beta Ethniki (Southern Group A)	**3rd**	30	22—19	Fourth Round	
1962–63	Beta Ethniki (Group 1)	12th (R)	48	32—49	Third Round	

The best result is highlighted in bold.

Key: 1R = First Round, 2R = Second Round, 3R = Third Round, 4R = Fourth Round, 5R = Fifth Round, GS = Group Stage, R16 = Round of 16, QF = Quarter-finals, SF = Semi-finals, C = Champion, P = Promotion, R = Relegation.

=== 1962 Beta Ethniki campaign ===
Home \ Away	AST	ATH	ATR	DIA	ELE	SAF	PRD	ROD
Asteras Athens		0–0	1–3	1–1	1–0	1–0	4–1	1–1
Athinaikos	0–0		0–0	2–1	3–2	1–0	3–2	0–2
Atromitos	2–1	1–0		3–0	0–0	3–1	4–0	2–0
Diagoras	4–1	0–0	3–1		3–3	2–1	3–3	0–1
Eleftheroupoli	3–2	2–0	1–0	2–1		1–3	3–0	0–0
PAO Samfrapoli	0–0	4–3	0–0	3–2	2–2		3–0	3–0
Parrodiakos	0–2	1–5	0–2	0–4	0–2	1–2		1–2
Rodiakos	0–0	2–1	1–0	0–0	4–1	4–1	5–0	

Source: rsssf.org
Legend: Blue = home team win; Yellow = draw; Red = away team win.

=== 1962–63 Beta Ethniki campaign ===
Home \ Away	AST	AMT	ATH	ATR	DIA	ELE	EVR	LEV	MCH	OLC	PAN	PAT	SAF	PTR	ROD
Asteras Athens		2–1	1–1	2–2	2–1	2–0	1–1	0–1	5–2	0–0	0–0	2–0	0–0	1–2	0–2
Aris Mytilene	0–2		0–2	0–2	0–2	1–1	1–2	0–2	0–2	1–2	0–2	0–2	0–2	2–1	0–2
Athinaikos	0–0	2–0		2–2	2–0	1–1	4–1	2–2	2–0	0–1	0–1	1–2	0–1	0–0	1–0
Atromitos	3–1	1–0	1–0		3–0	1–0	4–1	3–2	7–0	1–0	0–3	1–0	2–1	3–2	0–2
Diagoras	0–1	2–0	3–1	4–2		4–2	1–0	2–0	6–1	2–0	0–1	2–0	2–1	0–0	0–1
Eleftheroupoli	0–2	2–0	0–1	1–0	1–0		2–2	2–3	2–0	1–3	3–1	0–0	3–2	3–1	0–1
Evrypos Chalkida	2–2	2–0	1–2	0–0	0–1	2–0		1–1	5–0	1–2	0–5	0–0	0–1	2–2	0–0
Levadiakos	1–2	5–1	2–0	2–3	2–1	3–2	1–0		3–1	2–2	0–0	0–0	2–1	1–0	2–3
Mikrasiatiki Chios	1–2	0–1	0–4	1–2	0–6	0–3	2–0	1–0		0–2	0–3	0–4	2–4	0–0	0–2
Olympiakos Chalkida	1–0	2–0	5–1	0–0	2–1	2–1	0–1	2–0	5–0		2–1	0–0	1–1	6–0	2–0
Panachaiki	4–0	2–0	1–1	3–0	0–4	8–0	3–1	3–3	7–0	1–2		2–3	1–1	2–1	0–2
Panetolikos	0–0	4–1	2–0	1–2	1–1	3–0	4–2	1–0	3–1	0–0	1–0		2–1	2–0	2–0
PAO Samfrapoli	1–1	3–1	1–1	0–1	1–1	1–0	2–1	1–2	6–1	0–2	2–2	0–0		3–0	3–1
Patraikos OF	1–1	2–0	2–0	2–2	3–2	2–0	2–2	2–2	4–1	2–1	0–0	2–3	2–2		2–3
Rodiakos	2–0	6–1	0–1	1–0	3–1	3–2	3–0	2–1	4–1	0–2	0–0	2–1	1–2	1–0	

Source: rsssf.org
Legend: Blue = home team win; Yellow = draw; Red = away team win.

=== Greek Cup campaigns ===
Season	Round	Venue	Opponent	Home	Away	Qual.	Ref.
1941–44	Not held due to the Greco-Italian War and the German invasion of Greece						
1948–49	First Round	AEK Stadium	Archimidis Piraeus	–	2–1 (a.e.t.)		
1949–50	First Round	Rizoupoli Stadium	Athinaikos	4–2	–		
1949–50	Second Round	Elefsina Municipal Stadium	Panelefsiniakos	–	2–0		
1950–51	First Round	Zirineio Stadium	A.S. Panerythraikos	2–1	–		
1950–51	Second Round	Chalandri Municipal Stadium	A.E. Chalandri	7–2	–		
1950–51	Third Round	Nikaia Municipal Stadium	A.E. Karava	4–2	–		
1950–51	Fourth Round	Rizoupoli Stadium	Apollon Smyrnis	–	3–0		
1951–52	First Round	AEK Stadium	Kronos Athens	5–0	–		
1951–52	Second Round	Near East Stadium	A.E. Pagrati	–	4–2		
1952–53	First Round	Leoforos Alexandras Stadium	Arion Athens	2–0	–		
1952–53	Second Round	Rizoupoli Stadium	Apollon Smyrnis	–	3–2 (a.e.t.)		
1954–55	First Round	Rizoupoli Stadium	P.A.O. Kalogreza	3–1	–		
1954–55	Second Round	Nea Sfageia Stadium	Fostiras	–	5–2		
1955–56	First Round	AEK Stadium	P.A.O. Saframpoli	0–0 (a.e.t.)	–		
1955–56	Second Round	Rizoupoli Stadium	Aris Athens	–	1–0		
1956–57	First Round	AEK Stadium	Proodos Patisia	4–1	–		
1956–57	Second Round		Omilos Thermopyles	2–1	–		
1956–57	Third Round	Zirineio Stadium	Α.Ο. Kifisia	–	3–1		
1957–58	First Round	AEK Stadium	A.E. Taksiarxes	6–0	–		
1957–58	Second Round	Rizoupoli Stadium	A.Ο. Lavrio	5–2	–		
1957–58	Third Round	Vyronas National Stadium	Athinaikos	–	2–1		
1961–62	First Round	Nea Ionia Municipal Stadium	Ethnikos Peristeri	10–2	–		
1961–62	Second Round	–	Astrapi Rizoupoli	2–0 (w/o)	–		
1961–62	Third Round	Zirineio Stadium	G.S. Amarousion	3–2	–		
1961–62	Fourth Round	Stavros Mavrothalassitis Stadium	Egaleo	–	1–0		
1962–63	First Round	–	Bye	–	–	–	
1962–63	Second Round		Ethnikos Peristeri	3–0	–		
1962–63	Third Round	Rizoupoli Stadium	A.O. Giziakos	3–2	–		
1962–63	Fourth Round		P.A.O. Kalogreza	–	2–1		
1963–64	First Round	Nea Ionia Municipal Stadium	Α.Ε. Iraklis	14–2	–		
1963–64	Second Round	–	Fivos	2–0 (w/o)	–		
1963–64	Second Round	–	Kallithea	2–0 (w/o)	–		
1963–64	Third Round	Cholargos Municipal Stadium	A.O. Cholargos	3–2	–		
1963–64	Fourth Round	Rizoupoli Stadium	Apollon Smyrnis	–	2–1		

=== Overall record in major competitions ===
Competition	Home								Away								Total							
Competition	Pld	W	D	L	GF	GA	GD	Win%	Pld	W	D	L	GF	GA	GD	Win%	Pld	W	D	L	GF	GA	GD	Win%
Beta Ethniki	21	12	3	6	32	22	+10	57.14	21	2	5	14	22	46	−24	9.52	42	14	8	20	54	68	−14	33.33
Greek Cup	21	20	1	0	86	22	+64	95.24	12	0	0	12	11	30	−19	0.00	33	20	1	12	97	52	+45	60.61
Total	**42**	**32**	**4**	**6**	**118**	**44**	**+74**	**76.19**	**33**	**2**	**5**	**26**	**33**	**76**	**−43**	**6.06**	**75**	**34**	**9**	**32**	**151**	**120**	**+31**	**45.33**

== Performance against higher-profile clubs ==
Season	Competition	Round	Opponent	Home	Away	Ref.
1949–50	Greek Cup	First Round	Athinaikos	4–2	–	
1950–51	Greek Cup	Fourth Round	Apollon Smyrnis	–	3–0	
1952–53	Greek Cup	Second Round	Apollon Smyrnis	–	3–2 (a.e.t.)	
1954–55	Greek Cup	Second Round	Fostiras	–	5–2	
1956–57	Greek Cup	Third Round	A.O. Kifisia	–	3–1	
1957–58	Greek Cup	Third Round	Athinaikos	–	2–1	
1961–62	Greek Cup	Fourth Round	Egaleo	–	1–0	
1963–64	Greek Cup	Fourth Round	Apollon Smyrnis	–	2–1	
1961–62	Beta Ethniki	Southern Group A	Atromitos	1–0	0–0	
1961–62	Beta Ethniki	Southern Group A	Diagoras	2–1	3–3	
1961–62	Beta Ethniki	Southern Group A	Athinaikos	2–0	3–2	
1962–63	Beta Ethniki	Group 1	Atromitos	1–0	1–0	
1962–63	Beta Ethniki	Group 1	Diagoras	1–0	4–2	
1962–63	Beta Ethniki	Group 1	Athinaikos	0–1	1–1	
1962–63	Beta Ethniki	Group 1	Panetolikos	0–0	3–0	
1962–63	Beta Ethniki	Group 1	Panachaiki	3–1	8–0	
1963–64	Athens FCA A1	–	Ethnikos Asteras	3–1	3–1	
1963–64	Athens FCA A1	–	Athinaikos	0–0	2–2	
1982–83	Athens FCA A1	Group A	Marko	1–0	1–1	
1983–84	Athens FCA A1	Group B	A.E. Kifisia	1–0	1–2	

- Matches are classified as home or away depending on the team's allocation established after the Hellenic Football Federation's competition draw. Home and away games may not always take place at the designated home venue of the respective team.

== List of former players by stint and official transfer ==
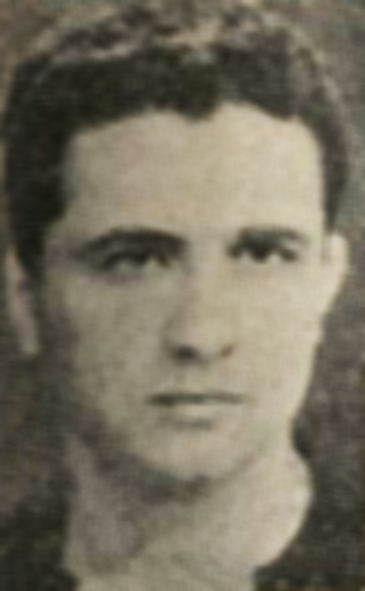
Tryfon Tzanetis

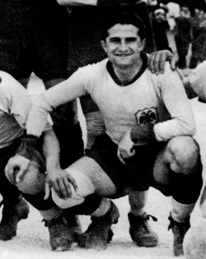
Georgios Magiras

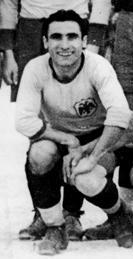
Xenofon Markopoulos

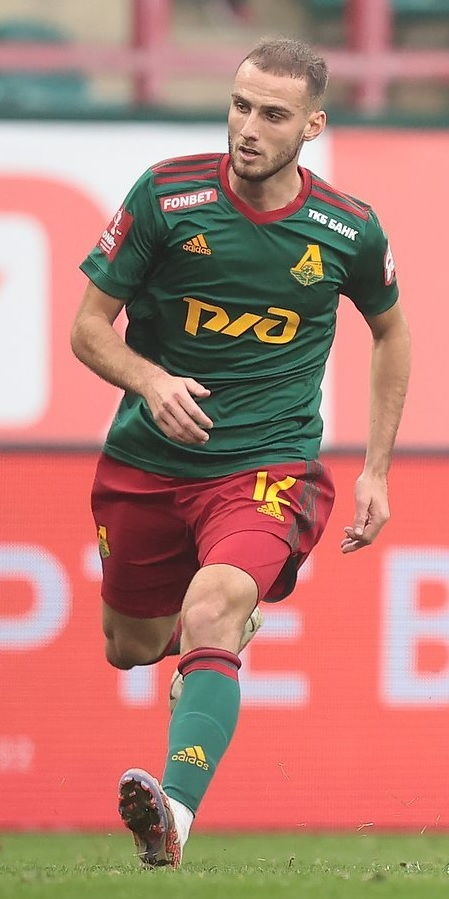
Mario Mitaj

Greece

- (Greece) (Ottoman Empire) Georgios Magiras (1931–33) → AEK Athens
- (Greece) (Ottoman Empire) Tryfon Tzanetis (1934–35) → AEK Athens
- (Greece) (Ottoman Empire) Xenofon Markopoulos (1952–55) ← AEK Athens
- (Greece) Ilias Boulbasis (1936–?) → AEK Athens
- (Greece) Konstantinos Pavlis (1936–?) → Apollon Smyrnis
- (Greece) Konstantinos Karabournis (1936–?) → Apollon Smyrnis
- (Greece) Giannis Vlantis (?–1945) → AEK Athens
- (Greece) Konstantinos Karagiaouris (1936–45) → AEK Athens
- (Greece) Manolis Kountouris (?–1947) → AEK Athens
- (Greece) Georgios Sevastiadis (?–1949) → AEK Athens
- (Greece) Konstantinos Tzoras (?) → Apollon Smyrnis
- (Greece) Athanasios Mitilinaios (?) → Apollon Smyrnis
- (Greece) Nikos Xanthopoulos (?) → Unknown
- (Greece) Georgios Filippou (?–1953) → Panathinaikos
- (Greece) Konstantinos Mavridopoulos (?–1953) → Olympiacos
- (Greece) Boutidis (?–1953) → AEK Athens
- (Greece) Stelios Lianos (?–1955) → AEK Athens
- (Greece) Stelios Panagiotidis (1934–60) → Panathinaikos
- (Greece) Stelios Skevofilakas (1958–61) → AEK Athens
- (Greece) Aris Mavridopoulos (?–1966) → PAS Giannina
- (Greece) Athanasios Bazimas (?) → AEK Athens
- (Greece) Aristeidis Mavrofrydis (?) → Egaleo
- (Greece) Theodoros Pantazopoulos (?) → Olympiacos
- (Greece) Athanasios Chelmis (?) → Ethnikos Piraeus
- (Greece) Ioannis Polychronopoulos (?) → AEK Athens
- (Greece) Dimitris Kotanidis (?) → AEK Athens
- (Greece) Kleanthis Askaridis (1984–) ← PAS Giannina
- (Greece) Antonis Panagiotopoulos (2004–06) → Mandraikos
- (Greece) Georgios Iordanidis (2007–08) → Sholing
- (Greece) Ahmet Satzit (2009–10) → A.O. Nea Ionia
- (Greece) Nikolaos Theodoropoulos (2015–16) → Retired

Rest of Europe

- (Albania) (Greece) Angelos Zisis (2007–08) → Unknown
- (Albania) (Greece) Mario Mitaj (?–2013) → AEK Athens
- (Albania) (Greece) Angelos Hamataj (2023) → A.O. Nea Ionia

Africa

- (Cameroon) Antoine Mbongue Ngoubo (2023–25) → Unknown

== Personnel ==
=== Current Board ===
Updated 9 July 2026

Position	Staff
President	(Greece) Ntora Kourtelesi
Vice President A	(Greece) Georgios Charalampopoulos
Vice President B	(Greece) Georgios Karypidis
General Secretary	(Greece) Christos Tegas
Secretary	(Greece) Antonios Leftakis
Chief Financial Officer	(Greece) Lazaros Kataras
Deputy General Manager	(Greece) Evangelos Cheinoporos
Operations Manager	(Greece) Dimitrios Vlassopoulos
Board Member	(Greece) Mina Kotroni
Technical Director	(Greece) Tasos Dimitriou

== Kit providers and sponsors ==
Updated 30 May 2026

Kit manufacturer	Period	Shirt sponsors
(Italy) Zeus	?	–
(Germany) Puma	2015–16	–
(United States) Nike	2018–23	(Greece) a&k
(England) Admiral	2023–26	(Greece) Arxontiko Hall

== Bibliography ==
- Howland, Charles P. (1926). L'Établissement des Réfugiés en Grèce. Avec 67 illustrations une carte d'établissement des réfugiés ruraux et urbains et une carte ethnographiques de la Macédoine (in French). Genève, Suisse: Société des Nations.
- Νικολαΐδης, Νίκος Δ. (2011). Εκεί, εκεί, στη Β' Εθνική! Απ' τα ντέρμπι του '60 στα μπαράζ του νέου αιώνα (in Greek). Αθήνα, Ελλάδα. ISBN 9789609327350.
- Σαπουντζάκης, Χάρης; Χριστοδούλου, Λουκάς (2013). Η ΝΕΑ ΙΩΝΙΑ ΣΤΟ ΜΕΣΟΠΟΛΕΜΟ 1922-1941 (in Greek). Αθήνα, Ελλάδα: Εκδόσεις Ένωσης Σπάρτης Μ. Ασίας. ISBN 9789609592017.
- Χριστοδούλου, Λουκάς (2014). Η ιστορία των σωματείων της Νέας Ιωνίας: Από την ίδρυση της πόλης έως τη Μεταπολίτευση 1923-1974 (in Greek). Γλύφα Βαρθολομιού Ηλείας, Ελλάδα: Εκδόσεις Μπαλτά. ISBN 9789609953290.
- Μπαλτάς, Ανδρέας (2022). Προσφυγικά Αθλητικά Σωματεία στον Μεσοπόλεμο 1922-1940 (in Greek). Γλύφα Βαρθολομιού Ηλείας, Ελλάδα: Εκδόσεις Μπαλτά. ISBN 9786185658014.
- Χριστοδούλου, Λουκάς (2022). Από τους Ποδαράδες 1922...Στη Νέα Ιωνία 1934...: Η Προσφυγική Πρωτεύουσα της Αθήνας (in Greek). Γλύφα Βαρθολομιού Ηλείας, Ελλάδα: Εκδόσεις Μπαλτά. ISBN 9786185658007.
