= 1962–63 Beta Ethniki =

Beta Ethniki
- Season: 1962–63
- Dates: 30 September 1962 – 30 June 1963
- Champions: Olympiacos Chalkida (Group 1); Pankorinthiakos (Group 2); Doxa Drama (Group 3); Edessaikos (Group 4)
- Promoted: Olympiacos Chalkida; Doxa Drama
- Relegated: PAO Samfrapoli; Athinaikos; Patraikos OF; Eleftheroupoli; Evrypos Chalkida; Mikrasiatiki Chios; Aris Mytilene; Omilos Kalamata; Apollon Kalamata; Ergotelis; Aris Korinthos; Kritikos Chania; Asteras Tripolis; Spartiatikos Sparti; Ethnikos Alexandroupoli; AE Komotini; Aspida Xanthi; Megas Alexandros Thessaloniki; Pallamiaki; Anagennisi Arta; Anagennisi Karditsa; Olympiacos Lamia; Amfissaikos

Beta Ethniki 1962–63 complete season.

== Group 1 ==
=== League table ===
Pos	Team	Pld	W	D	L	GF	GA	GD	Pts	Qualification or relegation
1	Olympiacos Chalkida (C, P)	28	18	6	4	49	17	+32	70	Qualification for Promotion play-off
2	Rodiakos	28	19	2	7	47	23	+24	68	
3	Panetolikos	28	15	8	5	40	18	+22	66	
4	Atromitos	28	17	5	6	48	30	+18	65 (Note: Atromitos had 2 points deducted.)	
5	Panachaiki	28	14	8	6	55	26	+29	64	
6	Levadiakos	28	12	7	9	45	38	+7	59	
7	Diagoras	28	14	3	11	49	30	+19	59	
8	Asteras Athens	28	10	11	7	32	29	+3	59	
9	PAO Samfrapoli (R)	28	11	9	8	44	32	+12	59	Relegation to C National Amateur Division
10	Athinaikos (R)	28	10	8	10	32	30	+2	56	Relegation to C National Amateur Division
11	Patraikos OF (R)	28	7	10	11	35	43	−8	52	Relegation to C National Amateur Division
12	Eleftheroupoli (R)	28	8	4	16	32	49	−17	48	Relegation to C National Amateur Division
13	Evrypos Chalkida (R)	28	5	7	16	30	48	−18	45	Relegation to C National Amateur Division
14	Mikrasiatiki Chios (R)	28	3	1	24	17	92	−75	35	Relegation to C National Amateur Division
15	Aris Mytilene (R)	28	2	1	25	11	61	−50	16 (Note: Aris Mytilene had 17 points deducted.)	Relegation to C National Amateur Division

(C) Champions; (P) Promoted; (R) Relegated

== Group 2 ==
=== League table ===
Pos	Team	Pld	W	D	L	GF	GA	GD	Pts	Qualification or relegation
1	Pankorinthiakos (C)	30	18	8	4	52	30	+22	74	Qualification for Promotion play-off
2	Aris Piraeus	30	20	3	7	63	31	+32	73	
3	Vyzas	30	15	10	5	49	29	+20	70	
4	Atromitos Piraeus	30	14	10	6	50	29	+21	66 (Note: Atromitos Piraeus had 2 points deducted.)	
5	Pannafpliakos	30	14	8	8	44	33	+11	66	
6	Panelefsiniakos	30	13	9	8	57	27	+30	65	
7	Argonaftis Piraeus	30	12	9	9	53	36	+17	63	
8	Irodotos	31	13	6	12	40	34	+6	63	
9	OFI	30	12	8	10	41	29	+12	62	
10	Omilos Kalamata (R)	30	14	4	12	50	45	+5	62	Relegation to C National Amateur Division
11	Apollon Kalamata (R)	30	13	4	13	47	45	+2	60	Relegation to C National Amateur Division
12	Ergotelis (R)	30	10	8	12	34	40	−6	58	Relegation to C National Amateur Division
13	Aris Korinthos (R)	30	9	4	17	38	52	−14	52	Relegation to C National Amateur Division
14	Kritikos Chania (R)	30	8	4	18	31	62	−31	50	Relegation to C National Amateur Division
15	Asteras Tripolis (R)	30	3	4	23	28	73	−45	40	Relegation to C National Amateur Division
16	Spartiatikos Sparti (R)	30	3	0	27	24	106	−82	36	Relegation to C National Amateur Division

(C) Champions; (R) Relegated

== Group 3 ==
=== League table ===
Pos	Team	Pld	W	D	L	GF	GA	GD	Pts	Qualification or relegation
1	Doxa Drama (C, P)	26	15	5	6	39	24	+15	61	Qualification for Promotion play-off
2	Thermaikos Thessaloniki	26	13	6	7	34	23	+11	58	
3	Iraklis Kavala	26	11	10	5	39	21	+18	58	
4	Makedonikos	26	12	7	7	46	30	+16	57	
5	Iraklis Serres	26	12	7	7	36	21	+15	55 (Note: Iraklis Serres, Apollon Serres and Megas Alexandros Thessaloniki had 2 points deducted.)	
6	MENT Toumba	26	13	3	10	37	34	+3	55	
7	Orfeas Xanthi	26	11	7	8	31	28	+3	55	
8	Elpida Drama	26	10	6	10	34	30	+4	52	
9	Apollon Serres	26	12	4	10	27	24	+3	52	
10	Filippoi Kavala	26	9	8	9	24	24	0	52	
11	Ethnikos Alexandroupoli (R)	26	7	8	11	27	36	−9	46 (Note: Ethnikos Alexandroupoli had 1 point deducted.)	Relegation to C National Amateur Division
12	AE Komotini (R)	26	4	9	13	29	50	−21	43	Relegation to C National Amateur Division
13	Aspida Xanthi (R)	26	6	3	17	28	48	−20	41	Relegation to C National Amateur Division
14	Megas Alexandros Thessaloniki (R)	26	4	3	19	17	55	−38	35	Relegation to C National Amateur Division

(C) Champions; (P) Promoted; (R) Relegated

== Group 4 ==
=== League table ===
Pos	Team	Pld	W	D	L	GF	GA	GD	Pts	Qualification or relegation
1	Edessaikos (C)	28	15	6	7	46	22	+24	64	Qualification for Promotion play-off
2	A.E. Trikala	28	14	8	6	48	30	+18	64	
3	Olympiacos Kozani	28	13	8	7	54	30	+24	62	
4	Achilleas Trikala	28	12	10	6	48	29	+19	62	
5	Olympiacos Volos	28	13	7	8	45	28	+17	61	
6	Veria	28	12	8	8	37	23	+14	60	
7	Larisaikos	28	11	8	9	35	31	+4	58	
8	Aris Ptolemaida	28	11	8	9	42	35	+7	58	
9	Averof Ioannina	28	12	5	11	37	34	+3	57	
10	Pallamiaki (R)	28	9	11	8	37	36	+1	57	Relegation to C National Amateur Division
11	Anagennisi Arta (R)	28	13	3	12	38	40	−2	57	Relegation to C National Amateur Division
12	Iraklis Larissa	28	9	10	9	26	28	−2	56	
13	Anagennisi Karditsa (R)	28	5	7	16	21	39	−18	45	Relegation to C National Amateur Division
14	Olympiacos Lamia (R)	28	4	6	18	25	59	−34	42	Relegation to C National Amateur Division
15	Amfissaikos (R)	28	2	4	22	16	91	−75	36	Relegation to C National Amateur Division

(C) Champions; (R) Relegated

== Promotion play-off ==
Pos	Team	Pld	W	D	L	GF	GA	GD	Pts	Promotion
1	Olympiacos Chalkida (P)	6	4	2	0	9	4	+5	16	Promotion to Alpha Ethniki
2	Doxa Drama (P)	6	2	3	1	6	4	+2	13	Promotion to Alpha Ethniki
3	Edessaikos	6	2	2	2	6	5	+1	12	
4	Pankorinthiakos	6	0	1	5	1	9	−8	7	

(P) Promoted

Home \ Away	OLC	DOX	EDE	PAG
Olympiacos Chalkida		0–0	1–0	3–1
Doxa Drama	1–1		0–2	3–0
Edessaikos	2–3	1–1		1–0
Pankorinthiakos	0–1	0–1	0–0	

Legend: Blue = home team win; Yellow = draw; Red = away team win.
