= EAFF Nations League =

Athletic competition

- Status: Active
- Genre: Sports event
- Frequency: 2 years
- Years active: 2
- Inaugurated: 2023
- Previous event: 2025
- Next event: 2027
- Area: Europe
- Organiser: European Amputee Football Federation

The EAFF Nations League is a biennial European tournament in the association football sport for amputee people, organized by European Amputee Football Federation. It was launched to be played in the years where there are no international competitions such as: EAFF European Amputee Football Championship or WAFF Amputee Football World Cup.

The teams are divided into four divisions based on their ranking. Each division consists of 4 or 5 teams, which will play a separate tournament. The hosts of each tournament are designated countries from the divisions which applied to host the event. The last team in the group will be relegated to lower division, whereas the best team will be promoted to the higher.

== Results by year ==
Edition	Year	Host	Nations played	Gold	Silver	Bronze	4th place	Ref.
1	2023	Poland, France,Belgium, Scotland	18	England	Turkey	Poland	Spain	
2	2025	Turkey, Spain, Azerbaijan, Romania	18	Poland	Turkey	England	Italy	

== Medals summary ==
Rank	Nation	Gold	Silver	Bronze	Total
1	England	1	0	1	2
1	Poland	1	0	1	2
3	Turkey	0	2	0	2
Totals (3 entries)		2	2	2	6

== See also ==
- Amputee football
- European Amputee Football Championship
- Amputee Football World Cup
