= Christos Voutsas =

Greek footballer

Personal information
- Date of birth: 31 July 2001 (age 25)
- Place of birth: Thessaloniki, Greece
- Height: 1.78 m (5 ft 10 in)
- Position: Defensive midfielder

Team information
- Current team: Panthrakikos
- Number: 8

Youth career
- 2009–2019: PAOK
- 2019–2021: Willem II

Senior career*
Years	Team	Apps	(Gls)
2021–2022	Ergotelis	30	(1)
2022–2023	Levadiakos	2	(0)
2022–2023	→ Panathinaikos B (loan)	23	(0)
2023–2024	Panathinaikos B	13	(1)
2024–2025	PAS Giannina	0	(0)
2025–2026	Niki Volos	19	(1)
2026–	Panthrakikos	0	(0)

International career^{‡}
2017–2018	Greece U17	9	(1)
- * Club domestic league appearances and goals as of 20 April 2026 ‡ National team caps and goals as of 24 March 2018

Christos Voutsas (Greek: Χρήστος Βουτσάς; born 31 July 2001) is a Greek professional footballer who plays as a defensive midfielder for Super League 2 club Panthrakikos.
