= Nikos Xanthopoulos =

Greek actor and singer (1934–2023)

Nikos Xanthopoulos Νίκος Ξανθόπουλος
- Born: 14 March 1934; Athens, Greece
- Died: 22 January 2023 (aged 88); Aigaleo, Greece
- Occupations: Actor, singer
- Years active: 1957–2023
- Spouse: Erifilli Xanthopoulou

Nikos Xanthopoulos (Greek: Nίκος Ξανθόπουλος; 14 March 1934 – 22 January 2023) was a Greek actor and singer, known for his roles in the 1960s era Greek Drama Cinema. He was also a singer of Greek folk bouzouki, having released many albums and singles. He was known as "the child of the folk" (παιδί του λαού) mainly for playing roles depicting men from the lower working classes. He usually portrayed a poor man, hit hard by fate, seeking justice or one struggling against wealthy and evil men. In other cases, he played the role of an immigrant in Germany working hard to provide for his wife and child. Other times he played an unknown poor bouzouki player and singer working his way up to stardom. From the late 1960s until the early 1970s, these roles helped him become a star in Greece during the dictatorship of the Junta.

== Biography ==
Xanthopoulos was born in Athens, Greece in 1934. He was a stage actor from 1957 to 1963, but he soon devoted himself exclusively to cinema. His film debut was in 1958 with a small role in Η Ζωή Μου Αρχίζει Με Σένα (My Life Starts With You). At 1964 he started collaborating with director-producer Apostolos Tegopoulos and the film company KLAK Film. That's when he became most famous for his roles – a golden period that lasted until 1971. It was his roles portraying him as a singer and bouzouki player that dictated that he needed to learn how to sing. Apostolos Kaldaras, a famous Greek musician and composer, taught Xanthopoulos to sing. Xanthopoulos sang over 300 songs in thirty movies, but his singing talent was not confined to movies. He recorded nine albums and 55 singles.

== Success ==
His most successful films were produced by KLAK Film, a film production company who specialised in Greek drama films, called μελό or σπαραξικάρδια. Films included: Ο Αετός των Σκλαβωμένων (The Eagle of the Enslaved) and Είμαι μια δυστυχισμένη (I am a miserable girl). Movies of that kind were successful.

== Collaborations ==
Xanthopoulos collaborated with many young actresses of his time, including Martha Vourtsi. Martha Vourtsi and Xanthopoulos, quickly became a duo, starring in seven films, their most notable being Περιφρόνα με γλυκιά μου (Contempt me, my dear). Other actresses that played the love interest of Nikos Xanthopoulos were: Angela Zilia, Afroditi Grigoriadou, Kakia Analyti, Katerina Vasilakou, Mairoula Evangelou, Dora Sitzani and Kaiti Papanika.

== Filmography ==
Xanthopoulos starred in 48 movies from 1958 to 1971:

- ‘’Oi antres xeroun na agapoun ‘’ (1971)
- Zousa monahos horis agapi (1971)
- Aetos ton sklavomenon, O (1970)
- Esena mono agapo (1970)
- Giakoumis, mia romeiki kardia (1970)
- Enas antras me syneidisi (1969)
- Ftohogeitonia agapi mou (1969)
- Gia tin timi kai ton erota (1969)
- Odysseia enos xerizomenou, I (1969)
- Sfragida toy Theou, I (1969)
- Kardia enos aliti, I (1968)
- Psihoula tou kosmou, Ta (1968)
- Tapeinos kai katafronemenos (1968)
- Xerizomeni geneia (1968)
- Adiki katara (1967)
- Kapote klaine kai oi dynatoi (1967)
- Anthropos pou gyrise apo ton pono, O (1966)
- Eho dikaioma na s'agapo (1966)
- Katatregmenos, O (1966)
- Sklavoi tis moiras (1966)
- Apokliroi tis koinonias (1965)
- Kardia mou papse na ponas (1965)
- Me pono, me dakry (1965)
- Perifrona me, glykia mou (1965)
- Eimai mia dystyhismeni (1964)
- Einai megalos o kaimos (1964)
- Epikindinoi, Oi (1964)
- Zitianos mias agapis (1964)
- Zoi gemati pono (1964)
- Agapisa kai ponesa (1963)
- Amartola heria (1963)
- Dipsa gia zoi (1963)
- Gia tin agapi tou paidiou mou (1963)
- Lenio i voskopoula (1963)
- Misos (1963)
- Pligomenes kardies (1963)
- Den gnorisa mitera (1962)
- Ekdikisi tou kavalari, H (1962)
- Katrakilisma sto vourko (1962)
- Pallikaras, O (1961)
- Spiti tis idonis, To (1961)
- Dervisopaida, Ta (1960)
- Idoni kai pathos (1960)
- Koritsi tou dromou, To (1960)
- Mitros kai o Mitrousis stin Athina, O (1960)
- Stahtobouta, I (1960)
- Pos pernoun oi padremenoi (1959)
- Zoi mou arkizei me sena, I (1958)

His most notable films are: Adiki Katara, Kapote Klaine Kai Oi Dynatoi, I Kardia Enos Aliti, O Katatregmenos, I Odysseia Enos Xerizomenou, Sklavoi Tis Moiras, Tapeinos Kai Katafronemenos, Ftohogeitonia Agapi Mou and Perifrona me Glykeia Mou.

== Sports ==
Nikos Xanthopoulos was a competitive athlete in both the triple jump and the 110-meter hurdles but also a dedicated supporter of the AEK Athens sports club and a football player for Eleftheroupoli.
