= Nuno Gonçalves (footballer) =

Portuguese footballer

Personal information
- Full name: Nuno João Oliveira Gonçalves
- Date of birth: 9 July 1998 (age 28)
- Place of birth: Braga, Portugal
- Height: 1.85 m (6 ft 1 in)
- Position: Centre-back

Team information
- Current team: O Elvas
- Number: 5

Youth career
- –2013: Braga
- 2013–2015: Benfica
- 2015–2016: Vitória de Guimarães
- 2016–2017: Benfica
- 2017–2020: Vitória de Guimarães

Senior career*
Years	Team	Apps	(Gls)
2017–2021	Vitória Guimarães B	8	(1)
2021–2022	Episkopi	27	(1)
2022–2024	Fafe	36	(0)
2024–	Anadia	20	(0)
- * Club domestic league appearances and goals as of 25 June 2025

Nuno João Oliveira Gonçalves (born 9 July 1998) is a Portuguese professional footballer who plays for Anadia as a defender.

== Club career ==
On 21 December 2017, Gonçalves made his professional debut with Vitória Guimarães B in a 2017–18 LigaPro match against Sporting B.
