= Nikitas Nikolis =

Greek association footballer

Personal information
- Date of birth: 16 June 2002 (age 24)
- Place of birth: Rhodes, Greece
- Height: 1.79 m (5 ft 10 in)
- Position: Left-back

Team information
- Current team: Iraklis Lardos

Youth career
- 2016–2021: Olympiacos

Senior career*
Years	Team	Apps	(Gls)
2021–2022	Olympiacos B	1	(0)
2022–2023	Chania	7	(0)
2023	Proodeftiki	10	(0)
2023–2025	Diagoras	38	(0)
2025	Chania	0	(0)
2025–2026	Apollon Kalythies		
2026–	Iraklis Lardos		
- * Club domestic league appearances and goals as of 15 June 2025

Nikitas Nikolis (Greek: Νικήτας Νικόλης; born 16 June 2002) is a Greek professional footballer who plays as a left-back for Iraklis Lardos.
