= Steve Rubanguka =

Rwandan footballer (born 1996)

Personal information
- Full name: Steve Rubanguka
- Date of birth: 14 October 1996 (age 30)
- Place of birth: Cyangugu, Rwanda
- Height: 1.88 m (6 ft 2 in)
- Position: Midfielder

Team information
- Current team: Al-Nojoom
- Number: 6

Youth career
- 2008–2009: FC Blaasveld
- 2009–2011: KVC Willebroek-Meerhof
- 2011–2013: K. Londerzeel S.K.
- 2013–2014: K.V. Mechelen
- 2014–2015: K.S.K. Heist

Senior career*
Years	Team	Apps	(Gls)
2015–2017	RFC Wetteren	8	(0)
2017–2019	Patro Eisden	28	(0)
2019–2020	K. Rupel Boom	12	(0)
2020–2021	Karaiskakis	16	(0)
2021–2022	Karaiskakis	26	(0)
2022–2023	Zimbru Chișinău	21	(0)
2023–	Al-Nojoom		

International career^{‡}
2021–	Rwanda	2	(0)
- * Club domestic league appearances and goals as of 17:32, 1 October 2021 (CEST) ‡ National team caps and goals as of 17:32, 1 October 2021 (CEST)

Steve Rubanguka (born 14 October 1996) is a Rwandan professional footballer who plays as a midfielder for the Saudi Second Division club Al-Nojoom and the Rwanda national team.

== Club career ==
=== Youth ===
Rubanguka's football career started in 2008 at the age of 12 in FC Blaasveld. The following year, he joined KVC Willebroek-Meerhof for two seasons and then joined K. Londerzeel S.K. He played there for two years and then left for one season to K.V. Mechelen and then one season with K.S.K. Heist.

=== Early career in Belgium ===
After KSK Heist Rubanguka joined RFC Wetteren in 2015 for two years, and after that he chose in 2017 for K. Patro Eisden Maasmechelen amid interest from K.V.C. Westerlo and Birmingham City FC from England. There he played for two seasons and then ended up in K. Rupel Boom F.C. in 2019. In August 2020, Rubanguka left Rupel Boom FC for Karaiskakis in Greece.

=== Karaiskakis ===
On 16 January 2021, Rubanguka made his professional debut for Karaiskakis in a game against Levadiakos.

=== FC Zimbru Chișinău ===
Rubanguka continued his professional career at FC Zimbru Chisinau.

=== Al-Nojoom ===
On 3 August 2023, Rubanguka joined Saudi Second Division club Al-Nojoom.

== International career ==
Rubanguka was called up to the Rwanda national team in November 2018 and November 2020 but sat on the bench two times. In March 2021, he was called up for the games against Mozambique and Cameroon for the 2021 Africa Cup of Nations qualification. He made his debut against Mozambique and played 45 minutes.
