= Leonidas Rossi =

Greek footballer

Personal information
- Date of birth: 19 April 1999 (age 27)
- Place of birth: Sarandë, Albania
- Height: 1.83 m (6 ft 0 in)
- Position: Left-back

Team information
- Current team: Athens Kallithea FC
- Number: 3

Youth career
- –2016: Ifestos Peristeri
- 2016–2017: Apollon Smyrnis

Senior career*
Years	Team	Apps	(Gls)
2017–2018	Pefki		
2018–2021	Apollon Smyrnis	20	(0)
2021–	Athens Kallithea FC	28	(0)

International career^{‡}
2019	Greece U21	2	(0)
- * Club domestic league appearances and goals as of 16 June 2023 ‡ National team caps and goals as of 26 March 2019

Leonidas Rossi (Greek: Λεωνίδας Ρώσση; Albanian: Leonid Roshi; born 19 April 1999) is a Greek professional footballer who plays as a left-back for Super League 2 club Athens Kallithea FC.

== Career ==
Rossi began his career with Apollon Smyrnis, making a total of 16 appearances in Super League 1 and two appearances in Super League 2 across three seasons, plus two appearances with the Greece Under-21 national team during that time.

In September 2021, Rossi joined Athens Kallithea FC.
