= Georgios Tzelepis =

Greek footballer

Personal information
- Date of birth: 12 November 1999 (age 26)
- Place of birth: Komotini, Greece
- Height: 1.86 m (6 ft 1 in)
- Position: Goalkeeper

Team information
- Current team: Tilikratis
- Number: 40

Youth career
- 2005–2015: Panthrakikos

Senior career*
Years	Team	Apps	(Gls)
2015–2017	Panthrakikos	3	(0)
2017–2019	Xanthi	0	(0)
2019–2022	Ergotelis	5	(0)
2022–	OF Ierapetra	4	(0)

International career^{‡}
2014–2015	Greece U16	2	(0)
2015–2016	Greece U17	1	(0)
- * Club domestic league appearances and goals as of 16 June 2023 ‡ National team caps and goals as of 24 February 2016

Georgios Tzelepis (Greek: Γεώργιος Τζελέπης; born 12 November 1999) is a Greek professional footballer who plays as a goalkeeper for A1 EPS Irakleiou club Irodotos.
