= Vangelis Andreou =

Greek footballer

Personal information
- Full name: Evangelos Andreou
- Date of birth: 3 September 1990 (age 36)
- Place of birth: Trikala, Thessaly, Greece
- Height: 1.85 m (6 ft 1 in)
- Position: Centre-back

Team information
- Current team: Vrachos Kastraki

Youth career
- PAOK

Senior career*
Years	Team	Apps	(Gls)
2009–2010	Meteora		
2010–2011	Thyella Petroto		
2011–2013	Trikala	17	(1)
2013–2014	Achilleas Triandria		
2014–2015	AO Chania	5	(0)
2015–2016	Pierikos	27	(1)
2016–2018	Apollon Larissa	57	(6)
2018–2019	Doxa Drama	23	(1)
2019–2021	Chania	43	(2)
2021–2024	Niki Volos	94	(3)
2024–2026	Anagennisi Karditsa	13	(0)
2026–	Vrachos Kastraki		
- * Club domestic league appearances and goals as of 20 April 2026

Vangelis Andreou (Greek: Βαγγέλης Ανδρέου; born 3 September 1990) is a Greek professional footballer who plays as a centre-back for Vrachos Kastraki.
