= Magers & Quinn =

Bookstore in Minneapolis, Minnesota

Coordinates: 44.9471°N 93.2988°W

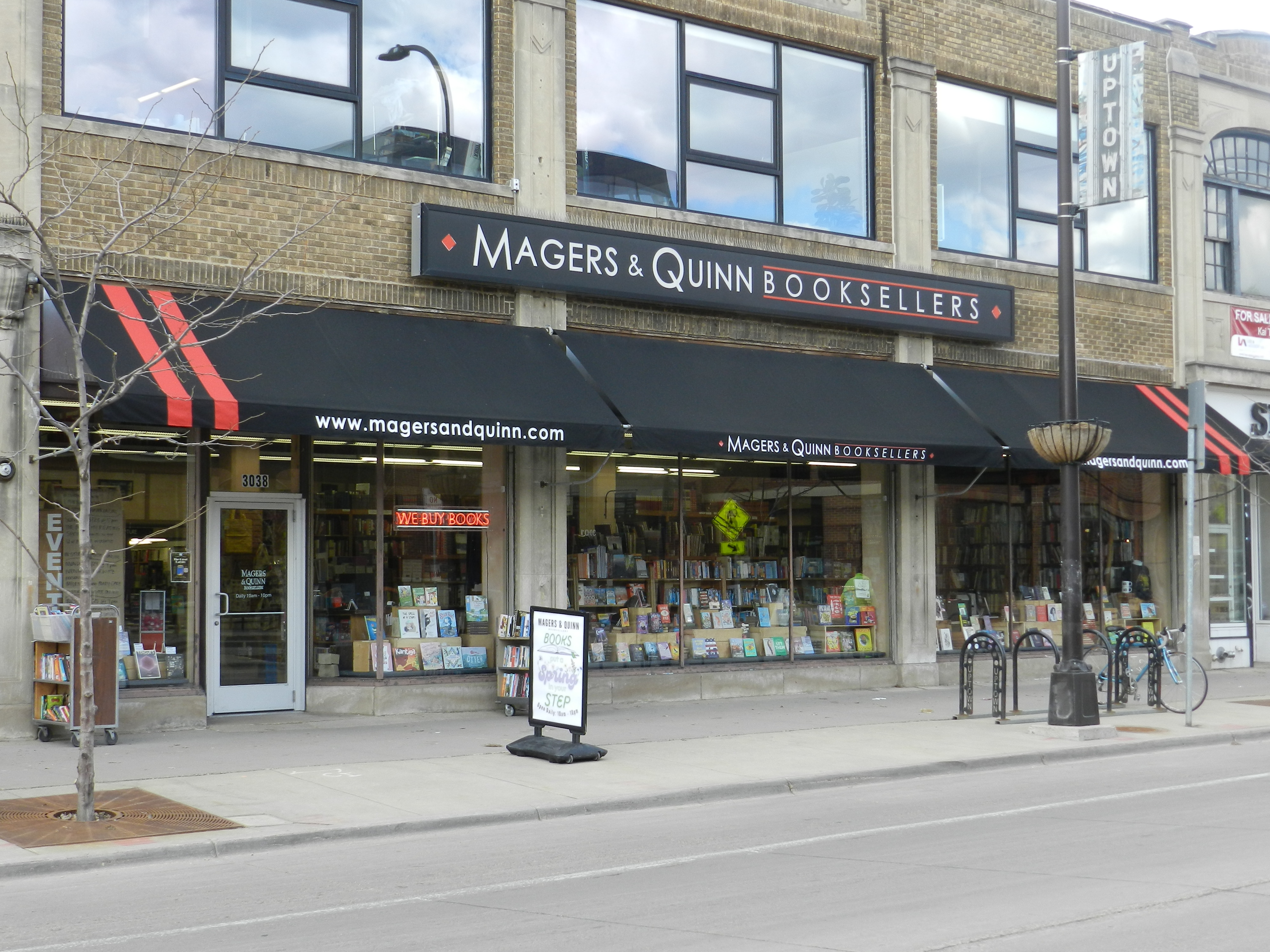
- Magers & Quinn viewed from across Hennepin Avenue.
- Interactive map of the Magers & Quinn area

General information
- Type: Bookstore
- Opened: August 1994
- Owner: Denny Magers

Website
- www.magersandquinn.com

Magers & Quinn (M&Q) is a bookstore located in Minneapolis, Minnesota, in the United States. It is the largest independent bookseller in the city.

== History ==
The store was founded by Denny Magers, who already owned a small antiquarian bookstore in the city. Magers and Quinn became his second bookstore. The title of the store comes from his father and mother's last names. The store opened in August 1994 during the Uptown Art Fair in the Bryant Building, a 1922 structure which originally housed an automobile dealership. Construction to expand the store was completed at a later date.

M&Q started as a used bookstore, buying used books from the public and libraries and reselling them. A small percentage of sales came from the sale of rare books as well as new and used collectible books. To confront the challenge posed by e-commerce (over 1,000 bookstores nationwide closed between 2000 and 2007 due to pressure from e-commerce), M&Q began offering two new categories of books. The first was newly published works. The second was new books which are no longer available, such as out-of-print books. As of 2015, each category accounted for roughly a third of the store's income.

M&Q also began to sell books online, and as of 2015 about 30 percent of total sales were online. The company maintains its own web site, but also partners with other online retailers such as Amazon.com.

As of 2015, Magers and Quinn was Minneapolis' largest independent bookstore. The store has more than 8,000 square feet (740 m^{2}) of sales space, 10,000 square feet (930 m^{2}) of storage space, and an inventory of roughly 250,000 books. Denny Magers is the only owner the store has had.

== Literary events ==
M&Q hosts several author readings and literary events a year.
