= Antonio Miço =

Greek footballer (born 2000)

Personal information
- Date of birth: 27 January 2000 (age 26)
- Place of birth: Athens, Greece
- Height: 1.90 m (6 ft 3 in)
- Position: Centre-back

Team information
- Current team: Saronikos Anavyssos
- Number: 15

Youth career
- –2016: Kalyvion
- 2016–2019: Panionios

Senior career*
Years	Team	Apps	(Gls)
2018–2020	Panionios	4	(0)
2020–2021	Terrassa	19	(0)
2021–2022	Ergotelis	26	(0)
2022–2023	Karmiotissa	12	(0)
2023–2024	Ionikos	2	(0)
2024	Egaleo	5	(0)
2024–2025	Dinamo City	1	(0)
2025–2026	CSM Reșița	11	(0)
2026–	Saronikos Anavyssos	0	(0)
- * Club domestic league appearances and goals as of 9 May 2026

Antonio Miço (Greek: Αντώνιο Μήτσο; born 27 January 2000) is a professional footballer who plays as a centre-back for Gamma Ethniki club Saronikos Anavyssos.
