= Nikos Milioris =

Greek author and military officer (1896–1983)

- Born: 1896; Urla, Aidin Vilayet, Ottoman Empire
- Died: 3 August 1983 (aged 86–87); Athens, Greece
- Occupations: Military officer, writer

Nikos E. Milioris (Greek: Νίκος Ε. Μηλιώρης; 1896–1983) was a Greek author and senior military officer.

== Biography ==
Milioris was born in Urla, Ottoman Empire (in present-day Turkey), to a local Greek family. He was educated at the Evangelical School of Smyrna, and following his graduation worked in his hometown as a secretary and an accountant. A few years later he moved to Greece, and joined the Hellenic Army.

After the end of the Greco-Turkish War and the following population exchange between Greece and Turkey, Milioris settled with his family in Athens as refugees while his father was killed earlier in Asia Minor. Milioris retired from service in 1952 with the rank of colonel.

The following years, Milioris established himself as a prolific writer of books, articles and studies about the history and cultural heritage of Asia Minor Greeks and their descendants. Moreover, he was an active member of several cultural organisations, groups and associations, and also editor of magazines and newspapers about Asia Minor.

Milioris died on 3 August 1983 in Athens. His wife, Rita Miliori, was also an author.

== Selected works ==
- Palamas and the refugees (Greek: Ο Παλαμάς και οι πρόσφυγες, Athens, 1950)
- Vourla in Asia Minor, Vol. I, II (Greek: Τα Βουρλά της Μικράς Ασίας, Athens, 1957 and 1965)
- Crypto-Christians (Greek: Οι Κρυπτοχριστιανοί, 1962)
- The most Profound Turning Point of our National History (Greek: Η βαθύτατη τομή της εθνικής μας ιστορίας, Athens, 1973)
- Milioris, Ν. (1970). Τα ελληνικά χωριά της περιοχής των Βουρλών Μ. Ασίας [The Greek villages of the region of Vurla in Asia Minor]. Μικρασιατικά Χρονικά (in Greek). 14: 177–225.
- Milioris, Ν. (1972). Στοιχεία του γλωσσικού ιδιώματος των Βουρλών της Μικράς Ασίας [Features of the Vurla dialect in Asia Minor]. Μικρασιατικά Χρονικά (in Greek). 15: 223–312.
