= Themistoklis Tselios =

Greek footballer

Personal information
- Date of birth: 6 October 1997 (age 29)
- Place of birth: Athens, Greece
- Height: 1.83 m (6 ft 0 in)
- Position: Goalkeeper

Team information
- Current team: Niki Volos
- Number: 34

Youth career
- AEK Athens

Senior career*
| Years | Team | Apps | (Gls) |
| 2015–2016 | Sparta | | |
| 2016–2017 | Zevgolateio | | |
| 2017–2018 | Panargiakos | | |
| 2018–2019 | Aittitos Spata | 2 | (0) |
| 2019–2021 | Diagoras | 44 | (0) |
| 2021–2022 | Ergotelis | 29 | (0) |
| 2022–2024 | Anagennisi Karditsa | 39 | (0) |
| 2024– | Niki Volos | 29 | (0) |

International career^{‡}
| 2014 | Greece U17 | 2 | (0) |
| 2016 | Greece U19 | 3 | (0) |
- * Club domestic league appearances and goals as of 2 April 2026 ‡ National team caps and goals as of 29 March 2016

Themistoklis Tselios (Greek: Θεμιστοκλής Τσέλιος; born 6 October 1997) is a Greek professional footballer who plays as a goalkeeper for Super League 2 club Niki Volos.

== Career ==
=== Ergotelis ===
On 8 July 2021, Greek Super League 2 club Ergotelis announced the signing of Tselios, on a two-year contract.

== Personal life ==
His twin brother, Ilias, is also a professional footballer.

== Career statistics ==
As of 2 April 2026

| Club | Season | League | | | Cup | | Continental | | Other | | Total | |
| Club | Season | Division | Apps | Goals | Apps | Goals | Apps | Goals | Apps | Goals | Apps | Goals |
|---|---|---|---|---|---|---|---|---|---|---|---|---|
| Aittitos Spata | 2018–19 | Superleague Greece 2 | 2 | 0 | 0 | 0 | — | | — | | 2 | 0 |
| Diagoras | 2019–20 | Superleague Greece 2 | 23 | 0 | 1 | 0 | — | | — | | 24 | 0 |
| Diagoras | 2020–21 | Superleague Greece 2 | 21 | 0 | 0 | 0 | — | | — | | 21 | 0 |
| Diagoras | Total | | 44 | 0 | 1 | 0 | — | | — | | 45 | 0 |
| Ergotelis | 2021–22 | Superleague Greece 2 | 29 | 0 | 1 | 0 | — | | — | | 30 | 0 |
| Anagennisi Karditsa | 2022–23 | Superleague Greece 2 | 14 | 0 | 0 | 0 | — | | — | | 14 | 0 |
| Anagennisi Karditsa | 2023–24 | Superleague Greece 2 | 25 | 0 | 0 | 0 | — | | — | | 25 | 0 |
| Anagennisi Karditsa | Total | | 39 | 0 | 0 | 0 | — | | — | | 39 | 0 |
| Niki Volos | 2024–25 | Superleague Greece 2 | 21 | 0 | 1 | 0 | — | | — | | 22 | 0 |
| Niki Volos | 2025–26 | Superleague Greece 2 | 8 | 0 | 1 | 0 | — | | — | | 9 | 0 |
| Niki Volos | Total | | 29 | 0 | 0 | 0 | — | | — | | 31 | 0 |
| Career Total | | | 143 | 0 | 4 | 0 | 0 | 0 | 0 | 0 | 147 | 0 |
