= Pavlos Laskaris =

Greek footballer

Personal information
- Date of birth: 19 March 1996 (age 30)
- Place of birth: Athens, Greece
- Height: 1.87 m (6 ft 2 in)
- Position: Defensive midfielder

Team information
- Current team: Asteras Kaisariani

Youth career
- Panerythraikos

Senior career*
Years	Team	Apps	(Gls)
2014–2015	Triglia Rafinas		
2015–2016	Fostiras		
2016–2017	Iraklis		
2017	AO Chania	18	(0)
2017–2018	Veria	11	(0)
2018–2019	Aiginiakos	10	(0)
2019	Trikala	11	(0)
2019–2020	Olympiacos Volos	10	(0)
2020–2022	Egaleo	45	(1)
2022–2023	Athens Kallithea	12	(0)
2023–2024	Rodos	27	(0)
2024–	Asteras Kaisariani	0	(0)
- * Club domestic league appearances and goals as of 16 June 2023

Pavlos Laskaris (Greek: Παύλος Λάσκαρης; born 19 March 1996) is a Greek professional footballer who plays as a defensive midfielder for Gamma Ethniki club Asteras Kaisariani.
