= 2019–20 Ergotelis F.C. season =

Season of a Greek football club

Ergotelis
2019–20 season
- Chairman: Maged Samy
- Manager: Nikki Papavasiliou (until 1 September 2019); Giannis Taousianis (2 September 2019–present)
- Stadium: Pankritio Stadium, Heraklion
- Super League 2: 7th (at the time of suspension due to COVID-19 pandemic)
- Greek Cup: Fifth Round (eliminated by Trikala)
- Top goalscorer: League: Joseph Efford (11 goals); All: Joseph Efford (11 goals)
Home colours	Away colours	Third colours

The 2019–20 season was Ergotelis' 90th season in existence and 13th overall in the second tier of the Greek football league system, as of this season restructured and founded as the Super League 2. The club also participated in the Greek Cup, entering the competition in the Fourth Round. The contents of this article cover club activities from 18 May 2019 until 30 June 2020.

Following a string of suspension periods due to lengthy and unfruitful negotiations of the Super League 2 board members with state broadcaster ERT, the season eventually began on 29 September 2019, with the club playing its last game on 9 March 2020. On 22 June 2020, following another lengthy suspension period due to the COVID-19 pandemic, the Super League 2 clubs voted by an overwhelming majority to formally end the 2019/20 season, declaring the current league standings as final. As a result, Ergotelis finished in the seventh spot of the Table with 29 points.

== Players ==
Summer acquisition
Winter acquisition

No.	Name	Nationality	Position (s)	Date of birth (age)	Signed from	Notes
Goalkeepers
1	Dimitrios Katsimitros	(Greece)	GK	12 June 1997 (23)	(Cyprus) Anorthosis Famagusta	
31	Manolis Kalogerakis	(Greece)	GK	12 March 1992 (28)	(Greece) Apollon Pontus	
40	Giorgos Tzelepis	(Greece)	GK	12 November 1999 (20)	(Greece) Xanthi	
75	Nikos Psimopoulos	(Greece)	GK	19 June 2003 (17)	Youth system	
Defenders
5	Christos Batzios (C)	(Greece)	CB	15 October 1991 (28)	(Greece) Kavala	
14	Nikos Peios	(Greece)	CB	17 June 1999 (21)	(Greece) Olympiacos U−20	
12	Michalis Bousis	(Greece)	CB / LB	2 January 1999 (21)	(Greece) AEK Athens	On loan.
32	Dominik Špiriak	(Slovakia)	CB / RB	22 March 1999 (21)	(Slovakia) DAC Dunajská Streda	On loan.
2	Konstantinos Provydakis	(Greece)	RB	21 May 1996 (24)	(Greece) Irodotos	
8	Kyriakos Mazoulouxis	(Greece)	CB	1 May 1997 (23)	Free agent	
33	Giannis Kiliaras	(Greece)	LB	9 June 1988 (32)	(Greece) OFI	
77	Arthur Bote	(Brazil)	LB	7 January 1997 (23)	(Portugal) Sintrense	
Midfielders
21	Albert Bruce	(Ghana)	CM	30 December 1993 (26)	(Greece) Panegialios	
23	Giannis Boutsakis	(Greece)	CM	8 February 1994 (26)	(Greece) Atsalenios	
26	Antonis Alexakis	(Greece)	CM	2 July 2001 (18)	Youth system	
80	Vítor Barata	(Portugal)	CM	3 March 1996 (24)	(Portugal) Marítimo B	
10	Antonis Bourselis (VC)	(Greece)	AM	6 July 1994 (25)	(Greece) OFI	
38	Ilias Tselios	(Greece)	AM	6 October 1997 (22)	(Greece) AEK Athens	Joined after loan end.
17	Oresti Kacurri	(Albania)	AM	25 February 1998 (22)	Youth system	
Forwards
11	Manolis Rovithis (2nd VC)	(Greece)	LW / CF	16 September 1992 (27)	(Greece) Sparti	
27	Charles Kwateng	(Belgium) (Ghana)	RW	27 May 1997 (23)	(Belgium) Lierse	
7	Giorgos Manousakis	(Greece)	CF	10 April 1998 (22)	Youth system	
9	Joseph Efford	(United States)	LW / CF	29 August 1996 (23)	Free agent	
19	Antonis Stathopoulos	(Greece)	CF	23 February 1998 (22)	(Greece) PAOK U−20	
20	Giannis Iatroudis	(Greece)	CF / AM	2 February 1999 (21)	Youth system	ACL rupture (injured) Source
36	Nektarios Azizi	(Greece)	CF	4 November 2000 (19)	(Greece) OFI U−19	
97	Ramez Medhat	(Egypt) (Hungary)	LW / RW	10 August 1999 (20)	(Egypt) Wadi Degla U−23	On loan.
98	Ahmet Atef	(Egypt)	CF	21 March 1998 (22)	(Egypt) Wadi Degla U−23	On loan.

=== The following players have departed in mid-season ===
15	Dimitris Voutsas	(Greece)	CB / LB	20 May 2000 (20)	(Greece) PAOK U−20	Loaned out.
8	Dimitris Grontis	(Greece)	AM	21 August 1994 (25)	(Greece) Aittitos Spata	Released.
4	Konstantinos Oikonomou	(Greece) (Hungary)	CB	16 March 1996 (24)	Free agent	Released.

Note: Flags indicate national team as has been defined under FIFA eligibility rules. Players and Managers may hold more than one non-FIFA nationality.

Head coach	Captain	Kit manufacturer	Shirt sponsor
(Greece) Giannis Taousianis	(Greece) Christos Batzios	(United States) Capelli Sport	(Greece) Vitex

== Transfers ==
Winter Transfer Window

=== In ===
Squad #	Position	Player	Transferred from	Fee	Date	Ref
32	DF	(Slovakia) Dominik Špiriak	(Slovakia) DAC Dunajská Streda	On loan	17 July 2019	
80	MF	(Portugal) Vítor Barata	(Portugal) Marítimo B	Free	18 July 2019	
77	DF	(Brazil) Arthur Bote	(Portugal) Sintrense	Free	18 July 2019	
–	MF	(Brazil) Murilo Cadina	(Ukraine) Lviv	Free	19 July 2019	
14	DF	(Greece) Nikos Peios	(Greece) Olympiacos U–20	Free	7 August 2019	
36	FW	(Greece) Nektarios Azizi	(Greece) OFI U–19	Free	25 August 2019	
12	DF	(Greece) Michalis Bousis	(Greece) AEK Athens	On loan.	25 August 2019	
38	MF	(Greece) Ilias Tselios	(Greece) AEK Athens	Free	29 August 2019	
97	FW	(Egypt) (Hungary) Ramez Medhat	(Egypt) Wadi Degla U–23	On loan.	23 January 2020	
8	DF	(Greece) Kyriakos Mazoulouxis	Free agent	Free	28 January 2020	
98	FW	(Egypt) Ahmet Atef	(Egypt) Wadi Degla U–23	On loan.	31 January 2020	

==== Promoted from youth system ====
Squad #	Position	Player	Date	Signed Until	Ref
26	MF	(Greece) Antonis Alexakis	25 August 2019	30 June 2023	
75	GK	(Greece) Nikos Psimopoulos	18 December 2019	31 December 2022	

Total spending: €0

=== Out ===
Position	Player	Transferred To	Fee	Date	Ref
DF	(Greece) Stelios Labakis	Free agent	Free	18 May 2019	
DF	(Cameroon) Patrick Bahanack	(France) Reims	Loan return	23 May 2019	
FW	(Belgium) Hugo Cuypers	(Greece) Olympiacos	Free	23 May 2019	
MF	(Greece) Ilias Tselios	(Greece) AEK Athens	Loan return	1 June 2019	
MF	(Greece) Vasilis Vogiatzis	(Greece) O.F. Ierapetra	Free	29 June 2019	
DF	(Greece) Kyriakos Mazoulouxis	Free agent	Free	30 June 2019	
FW	(Greece) Antonis Kapnidis	(Cyprus) Digenis Morphou	Free	7 August 2019	
MF	(Greece) Konstantinos Chatzidimpas	(Greece) Triglia	Free	23 August 2019	
MF	(Brazil) Murilo Cadina	Free agent	Free	27 August 2019	
MF	(Greece) Dimitris Grontis	(Cyprus) ASIL Lysi	Free	31 December 2019	
DF	(Greece) Dimitris Voutsas	(Greece) Triglia	Loan	31 December 2019	
DF	(Greece) Konstantinos Oikonomou	(Slovakia) Šamorín	Free	31 January 2020	

Total income: €0
Expenditure: €0

== Managerial changes ==
Outgoing manager	Manner of departure	Date of vacancy	Position in table	Incoming manager	Date of appointment
(Cyprus) Nikki Papavasiliou	Contract terminated.	1 September 2019	--	(Greece) Giannis Taousianis	2 September 2019

== Kit ==
2019−20

Supplier: Capelli
Sponsor(s): Vitex

Home	Away	Third

Source: ergotelisfc.gr

Variations

Supplier: Capelli
Sponsor(s): Vitex

Away Alt.

Source: ergotelis.gr

Friendlies

Supplier: Capelli
Sponsor(s): Blue Star Ferries/ANEK Lines

Friendlies #1	Friendlies #2	Friendlies #3

Source: ergotelis.gr

== Preseason and friendlies ==
=== Preseason friendlies ===
Win Draw Loss Postponed

3 August 2019 Friendly	Ergotelis (Greece)	4–1	(Greece) Irodotos	Heraklion, Crete, Greece
18:30 EEST	Stathopoulos 75'; Azizi 77', 84', 90'	Report	Kousidis 28' (pen.)	Stadium: Pankritio Stadium

10 August 2018 Friendly ^{1}	Ergotelis (Greece)	4–0	(Greece) Almyros Gazi	Heraklion, Crete, Greece
18:00	Barata 5'; Cadina 22'; Efford 27'; Provydakis 51'	Report		Stadium: Pankritio Stadium

10 August 2018 Friendly ^{1}	Ergotelis (Greece)	0–0	(Greece) Damasta	Heraklion, Crete, Greece
19:30		Report		Stadium: Pankritio Stadium

14 August 2019 Friendly	Ergotelis (Greece)	2–0	(Greece) OF Ierapetra	Heraklion, Crete, Greece
18:00 EEST	Manousakis 70'; Barata 90'	Report		Stadium: Pankritio Stadium

17 August 2019 Friendly	Ergotelis (Greece)	2–2	(Greece) OFI	Heraklion, Crete, Greece
19:00 EEST	Manousakis 59'; Rovithis 78' (pen.)	Report	Nabi 28'; Manos 44'	Stadium: Pankritio Stadium

21 August 2019 Friendly	Ergotelis (Greece)	2–2	(Greece) Chania	Heraklion, Crete, Greece
18:00 EEST	Rovithis 4', 18'	Report	Tzioras 21'; Leozinho 88'	Stadium: Pankritio Stadium

28 August 2019 Friendly^{2}	Wadi Degla (Egypt)	2–1	(Greece) Ergotelis	New Cairo, Egypt
19:00 EET	Arafat 19'; Helal 38' (pen.)	Report	Rovithis 14'	Stadium: Petro Sport Stadium

31 August 2019 Friendly	Suez (Egypt)	0–0	(Greece) Ergotelis	Ain Sokhna, Suez, Egypt
17:00 EET		Report		Stadium: Sokhna Marina Wadi Degla

3 September 2019 Friendly	Semad El Suez (Egypt)	0–1	(Greece) Ergotelis	Ain Sokhna, Suez, Egypt
17:30 EET		Report	Kwateng 63'	Stadium: Sokhna Marina Wadi Degla

8 September 2019 Friendly	OF Ierapetra (Greece)	0–3	(Greece) Ergotelis	Ierapetra, Crete, Greece
18:00 EEST		Report	Rovithis 10'; Kwateng 40'; Manousakis 55'	Stadium: Petros Vouzounerakis Stadium

14 September 2019 Friendly	Chania (Greece)	0–0	(Greece) Ergotelis	Chania, Crete, Greece
17:30 EEST		Report		Stadium: Perivolia Municipal Stadium

18 September 2019 Friendly^{3}	Ergotelis (Greece)	v	(Greece) Poros	Heraklion, Crete, Greece
19:30 EEST				Stadium: Pankritio Stadium

1. 60-minute friendly.
2. 135-minute friendly.
3. Indefinitely postponed due to unavailability of Stadium.

=== Mid-season friendlies ===
Win Draw Loss Postponed

12 October 2019 Friendly	Ergotelis (Greece)	3–2	(Greece) OFI	Heraklion, Crete, Greece
11:00 EEST	Efford 6'; Manousakis 51'; Barata 88'	Report	Manos 23' (pen.); Nabi 87'	Stadium: Pankritio Stadium

19 October 2019 Friendly	Ergotelis (Greece)	1–1	(Greece) Chania	Heraklion, Crete, Greece
16:00 EEST	Kwateng 77'	Report	Dimitriadis 62'	Stadium: Pankritio Stadium

== Competitions ==
=== Overview ===
Competition	Started round	Current position / round	Final position / round	First match	Last match
Super League 2	1	7th / 20	7th / 20	29 September 2019	9 March 2020
Greek Football Cup	Fourth Round	Fifth Round	Fifth Round	25 September 2019	3 December 2019

Last updated: 22 June 2020

== Super League 2 ==
=== Regular season ===
==== League table ====
Pos	Team	Pld	W	D	L	GF	GA	GD	Pts	Promotion or relegation
5	Karaiskakis	20	9	4	7	32	29	+3	31	
6	Apollon Larissa	20	9	3	8	27	25	+2	30	
7	Ergotelis	20	9	2	9	31	33	−2	29	
8	Panachaiki	20	8	4	8	34	19	+15	28	
9	Platanias (R)	20	8	2	10	26	32	−6	26	Relegation to Gamma Ethniki

Source: sl2fl.gr
Rules for classification: 1) Points; 2) Head-to-head points; 3) Head-to-head goal difference; 4) Goals scored; 5) Goals against; 6) Play-offs (neutral ground, only used if needed to decide teams for promotion or relegation).
(R) Relegated

==== Results summary ====
Overall								Home						Away					
Pld	W	D	L	GF	GA	GD	Pts	W	D	L	GF	GA	GD	W	D	L	GF	GA	GD
20	9	2	9	31	33	−2	29	5	1	4	15	15	0	4	1	5	16	18	−2

Last updated: 9 March 2020.
Source: Competitive matches

==== Results by round ====
Round	1	2	3	4	5	6	7	8	9	10	11	12	13	14	15	16	17	18	19	20	21	22
Ground	A	H	A	H	H	A	H	A	A	H	A	H	A	H	A	A	H	A	H	H	A	H
Result	L	L	D	W	W	L	W	L	W	W	W	L	W	L	W	L	W	L	L	D	-	-
Position	10	10	10	10	7	10	8	10	7	6	4	7	5	7	5	7	6	6	7	7	7	7

Updated to match(es) played on 9 March 2020. Source: footballleaguenews.gr
A = Away; H = Home; W = Win; D = Draw; L = Loss

==== Matches ====
Win Draw Loss Postponed

29 September 2019 1	Apollon Smyrnis	3–0	Ergotelis	Rizoupoli, Athens, Greece
16:00 EEST	Blažić (yellow card) 17'; Bastianos (yellow card) 22'; Thomás 39', 49'; Markovski 56'	Report	Špiriak (yellow card) 11'	Stadium: Georgios Kamaras Stadium; Referee: Andreas Vlachos (East Attica)

28 October 2019 2	Ergotelis	1–2	Platanias	Heraklion, Crete, Greece
17:00 EET	Efford 1'; Špiriak (yellow card) 4'; Tselios (yellow card) 43'	Report	Karagounis (yellow card) 22'; Loukinas 37'; Bianconi 87'	Stadium: Pankritio Stadium; Referee: Konstantinos Tsetsilas (Grevena)

4 November 2019 3	PAS Giannina	2–2	Ergotelis	Ioannina, Greece
17:00 EET	Pamlidis 55' (pen.), 73'	Report	Efford 19'; Provydakis (yellow card) 54'; Rovithis 58'	Stadium: Zosimades Stadium; Referee: Panagiotis Koukoulas (Lesvos)

11 November 2019 4	Ergotelis	2–1	Kerkyra	Heraklion, Crete, Greece
17:00 EET	Špiriak (yellow card) 48'; Kwateng 64'; Rovithis 90+6'	Report	Piastopoulos (yellow card) 17'; Voukelatos 89'	Stadium: Pankritio Stadium; Referee: Charalabos Sotiriadis (Lasithi)

17 November 2019 5	Ergotelis	4–2	Karaiskakis	Heraklion, Crete, Greece
15:00 EET	Boutsakis 13'; Provydakis 20'; Kwateng 23'; Efford 90+4'	Report	Chatzistravos 31'; Psianos 75'	Stadium: Pankritio Stadium; Referee: Spyridon Kolytas (Lasithi)

24 November 2019 6	Apollon Larissa	3–1	Ergotelis	Larissa, Larissa, Greece
14:00 EET	Balotelli 15', 43'; Bastakos 50'	Report	Efford 75'	Stadium: Apollon Stadium; Referee: Stefanos Kalatzis (Thessaly)

29 November 2019 7	Ergotelis	2–1	Panachaiki	Heraklion, Crete, Greece
17:30 EET	Rovithis 17'; Kwateng 28'; Peios (yellow card) 86'; Provydakis (yellow card) 87'	Report	Moraitis 42'; Papatolios (yellow card) 86'	Stadium: Pankritio Stadium; Referee: Nikolaos Theodoropoulos (Florina)

6 December 2019 8	Levadiakos	1–0	Ergotelis	Livadeia, Greece
16:00 EET	Ioannidis 31'; Vichos (yellow card) 55'	Report	Peios (yellow card) 34'; Provydakis (yellow card) 49'; Efford (yellow card) 71'	Stadium: Levadia Municipal Stadium; Referee: Fotis Polychronis (Pieria)

14 December 2019 9	Doxa Drama	1–2	Ergotelis	Drama, Drama, Greece
15:00 EET	Ioannidis 3'; Koukolis (yellow card) 41'; Kwabena (yellow card) 49'	Report	Bourselis (yellow card) 20'; Rovithis 83', 90'	Stadium: Doxa Drama Stadium; Referee: Angelos Aggelakis (Macedonia)

23 December 2019 10	Ergotelis	1–0	Chania	Heraklion, Crete, Greece
17:00 EET	Batzios (yellow card) 78'; Boutsakis (yellow card) 82'; Barata (yellow card) 88'; Rovithis 90+4'	Report	Kouskounas (yellow card) 30'; Triantafyllakos (yellow card) 60'; Kassos (yellow card) 90+7'	Stadium: Pankritio Stadium; Referee: Apostolos Tzoumalakis (Serres)

5 January 2020 11	Apollon Pontus	1–3	Ergotelis	Kalamaria, Macedonia, Greece
14:30 EET	Brito 89' (pen.)	Report	Efford 42'; Barata 67'; Rovithis 73'	Stadium: Kalamaria Stadium; Referee: Dimitrios Theocharis (Thessaly)

10 January 2020 12	Ergotelis	0–2	Apollon Smyrnis	Heraklion, Crete, Greece
17:00 EET	Bruce (yellow card) 65'; Provydakis (yellow card) 85'	Report	Thomás (yellow card) 15', (goal) 28', 88' (pen.); Markovski (yellow card) 61'; Gino (yellow card) 65'; Huanderson (yellow card) 67'	Stadium: Pankritio Stadium; Referee: Georgios Labrou (Euboea)

17 January 2020 13	Platanias	2–4	Ergotelis	Chania, Crete, Greece
17:30 EET	Smyrlakis (yellow card) 11'; Revythopoulos (yellow card) 31'; Leiria 58'; Loukinas 90+3'	Report	Efford (yellow card) 6', (goal) 90+2'; Rovithis 22' (pen.); Boutsakis 34'; Tsamouris 64' (o.g.)	Stadium: Perivolia Municipal Stadium; Referee: Eleni Antoniou (East Attica)

26 January 2020 14	Ergotelis	1–2	PAS Giannina	Heraklion, Crete, Greece
17:00 EET	Bruce (yellow card) 23'; Batzios (yellow card) 54'; Bourselis (yellow card) 77'; Tselios (yellow card) 88'; Efford 90+1'	Report	Boukouvalas (yellow card) 12'; Léo 39', 51', (yellow card) 78'; Xydas (yellow card) 60'; Kartalis (yellow card) 80'	Stadium: Pankritio Stadium; Referee: Angelos Aggelakis (Macedonia)

31 January 2020 15	Kerkyra	0–4	Ergotelis	Corfu, Kerkyra, Greece
15:00 EET		Report	Efford 30', 47', 71'; Barata 34'	Stadium: Kerkyra Stadium; Referee: Konstantinos Panytsidis (Kozani)

9 February 2020 16	Karaiskakis	3–0	Ergotelis	Arta, Arta, Greece
14:45 EET	Kyvelidis 16', (yellow card) 51'; Psianos 41'; Kapias 54'	Report	Peios (yellow card) 53'; Provydakis (yellow card) 55'	Stadium: Agioi Anargiroi Municipal Stadium; Referee: Athanasios Dragousis (Kilkis)

14 February 2020 17	Ergotelis	1–0	Apollon Larissa	Heraklion, Crete, Greece
16:00 EET	Efford 37'	Report		Stadium: Pankritio Stadium; Referee: Andreas Gkamaris (Athens)

23 February 2020 18	Panachaiki	2–0	Ergotelis	Agyia, Patras, Greece
13:00 EET	Mavrias 12'; Mitidis 19'; Kapoutaglis (yellow card) 90+3'	Report	Batzios (yellow card) 40'; Atef (yellow card) 71'; Methad (yellow card) 81'; Tselios (yellow card) 82'; Boutsakis (yellow card) 82'	Stadium: Kostas Davourlis Stadium; Referee: Konstantinos Katikos (Athens)

2 March 2020 19	Ergotelis	1–3	Levadiakos	Heraklion, Crete, Greece
16:00 EET	Peios (yellow card) 32'; Boutsakis (yellow card) 39'; Rovithis 90+5' (pen.)	Report	Symelidis (yellow card) 15'; Poletto (yellow card) 35'; Mejía 70'; Nikas 83'; Vichos 89'; Angoua (yellow card) 90+4'	Stadium: Pankritio Stadium; Referee: Efthymios Kourentas (Trikala)

9 March 2020 20	Ergotelis	2–2	Doxa Drama	Heraklion, Crete, Greece
16:00 EET	Bourselis 21'; Kacurri (yellow card) 51'; Rovithis (yellow card) 77'; Bousis 83'; Barata (yellow card) 86'	Report	Rovas 29', 89'	Stadium: Pankritio Stadium; Referee: Athanasios Dragousis (Kilkis)

21^{a}	Chania	v	Ergotelis	–
				Stadium: –

22^{a}	Ergotelis	v	Apollon Pontus

a. Match not held due to the COVID-19 pandemic.

== Greek Cup ==
=== Fourth round ===
Home team	Score	Away team
Egaleo	0–2	Ergotelis (Q)

==== Matches ====
Win Draw Loss

25 September 2019 Fourth Round	Egaleo	0–2	Ergotelis	Egaleo, Athens, Greece
16:00 EEST	(yellow card) 62'; (yellow card) 80'	Report	Barata 71'; Bourselis 79'	Stadium: Stavros Mavrothalassitis Stadium; Referee: Panagiotis Koukoulas (Lesbos)

=== Fifth Round ===
Team 1	Agg.	Team 2	1st leg	2nd leg
Trikala (Q)	4–2	Ergotelis	3–2	1–0

==== Matches ====
Win Draw Loss

31 October 2019 1st Leg	Trikala	3–2	Ergotelis	Trikala, Greece
19:30 EET	Vertzos (yellow card) 41'; Eleftheriadis 53'; Lottas (yellow card) 72'; Peláez 81' (pen.); Pelkas (yellow card) 83'; Tsipras 89'; Niaros (yellow card) 90'	Report	Tsipras 67' (o.g.); Iatroudis 70'	Stadium: Trikala Municipal Stadium; Referee: Dimitrios Theocharis (Thessaly)

3 December 2019 2nd leg	Ergotelis	0–1 (2–4 agg.)	Trikala	Heraklion, Crete, Greece
17:15 EET	Bote (yellow card) 22'	Report	Vertzos 7'	Stadium: Pankritio Stadium; Referee: Andreas Vlachos (East Attica)

== Statistics ==
=== Squad statistics ===
As of 9 March 2020

Appearances denote players in the starting lineup, with the numbers in parentheses denoting appearances as substitute.

No.	Name	Super League 2		Greek Cup		Total	
No.	Name	Apps	Goals	Apps	Goals	Apps	Goals
Goalkeepers
1	(Greece) Dimitrios Katsimitros	11	0	0	0	11	0
31	(Greece) Manolis Kalogerakis	9	0	3	0	12	0
40	(Greece) Giorgos Tzelepis	0	0	0	0	0	0
Defenders
2	(Greece) Konstantinos Provydakis	18	1	1	0	19	1
5	(Greece) Christos Batzios	18	0	1	0	19	0
8	(Greece) Kyriakos Mazoulouxis	4 (1)	0	0	0	4 (1)	0
12	(Greece) Michalis Bousis	10 (2)	1	2	0	12 (2)	1
14	(Greece) Nikos Peios	8 (3)	0	2	0	10 (3)	0
32	(Slovakia) Dominik Špiriak	12	0	2	0	14	0
33	(Greece) Giannis Kiliaras	6 (2)	0	0 (1)	0	6 (3)	0
77	(Brazil) Arthur Bote	5 (5)	0	1	0	6 (5)	0
Midfielders
10	(Greece) Antonis Bourselis	10 (4)	1	0 (1)	1	10 (5)	2
17	(Albania) Oresti Kacurri	2 (5)	0	0 (1)	0	2 (6)	0
21	(Ghana) Albert Bruce	14	0	3	0	17	0
26	(Greece) Antonis Alexakis	0 (1)	0	1	0	1 (1)	0
23	(Greece) Giannis Boutsakis	11 (5)	2	2	0	13 (5)	2
38	(Greece) Ilias Tselios	16 (2)	0	3	0	19 (2)	0
80	(Portugal) Vítor Barata	9 (8)	2	1 (1)	1	10 (9)	3
Forwards
7	(Greece) Giorgos Manousakis	2 (6)	0	2	0	4 (6)	0
9	(United States) Joseph Efford	19	11	2	0	21	11
11	(Greece) Manolis Rovithis	14 (4)	9	0 (2)	0	14 (6)	9
19	(Greece) Antonis Stathopoulos	0 (2)	0	2	0	2 (2)	0
20	(Greece) Giannis Iatroudis	2 (1)	0	1 (1)	1	3 (2)	1
27	(Belgium) Charles Kwateng	8	3	1 (1)	0	9 (1)	3
36	(Greece) Nektarios Azizi	0 (1)	0	0	0	0 (1)	0
97	(Egypt) Ramez Medhat	2 (2)	0	0	0	2 (2)	0
98	(Egypt) Ahmet Atef	3 (2)	0	0	0	3 (2)	0
Players transferred/loaned out during the season
8	(Greece) Dimitris Grontis	5 (3)	0	0 (1)	0	5 (4)	0
15	(Greece) Dimitris Voutsas	0	0	1	0	1	0
4	(Greece) Konstantinos Oikonomou	2	0	2	0	4	0

Last season lineup vs. Doxa Drama
(4–3–3, SL2 R.20).

=== Goal scorers ===
Player has departed in mid-season

No.	Pos.	Nation	Name	Super League 2	Greek Cup	Total
9	FW	(United States)	Joseph Efford	11	0	11
11	FW	(Greece)	Manolis Rovithis	9	0	9
27	FW	(Belgium)	Charles Kwateng	3	0	3
80	MF	(Portugal)	Vítor Barata	2	1	3
23	MF	(Greece)	Giannis Boutsakis	2	0	2
10	MF	(Greece)	Antonis Bourselis	1	1	2
2	DF	(Greece)	Konstantinos Provydakis	1	0	1
12	DF	(Greece)	Michalis Bousis	1	0	1
20	FW	(Greece)	Giannis Iatroudis	0	1	1
	-	-	Opponent's own Goals	1	1	2
TOTAL				31	4	35

Last updated: 9 March 2020
Source: Competitive matches

=== Disciplinary record ===
S	P	N	Name	Football League			Cup			Total		
S	P	N	Name	Yellow card	Yellow-red card	Red card	Yellow card	Yellow-red card	Red card	Yellow card	Yellow-red card	Red card
2	DF	(Greece)	Konstantinos Provydakis	5	0	0	0	0	0	5	0	0
14	DF	(Greece)	Nikos Peios	4	0	0	0	0	0	4	0	0
8	DF	(Slovakia)	Dominik Špiriak	3	0	0	0	0	0	3	0	0
5	DF	(Greece)	Christos Batzios	3	0	0	0	0	0	3	0	0
38	MF	(Greece)	Ilias Tselios	3	0	0	0	0	0	3	0	0
23	MF	(Greece)	Giannis Boutsakis	3	0	0	0	0	0	3	0	0
9	FW	(United States)	Joseph Efford	2	0	0	0	0	0	2	0	0
21	MF	(Ghana)	Albert Bruce	2	0	0	0	0	0	2	0	0
10	MF	(Greece)	Antonis Bourselis	2	0	0	0	0	0	2	0	0
80	MF	(Portugal)	Vítor Barata	2	0	0	0	0	0	2	0	0
98	FW	(Egypt)	Ahmet Atef	1	0	0	0	0	0	1	0	0
97	FW	(Egypt)	Ramez Medhat	1	0	0	0	0	0	1	0	0
17	MF	(Albania)	Oresti Kacurri	1	0	0	0	0	0	1	0	0
11	MF	(Greece)	Manolis Rovithis	1	0	0	0	0	0	1	0	0
77	DF	(Brazil)	Arthur Bote	0	0	0	1	0	0	1	0	0
TOTALS				28	0	0	1	0	0	29	0	0

Last updated: 9 March 2020
Source: Competitive matches
Ordered by (red card) , (yellow card) (yellow-red card) and (yellow card)
(yellow card) = Number of bookings; (yellow card) (yellow-red card) = Number of sending offs after a second yellow card; (red card) = Number of sending offs by a direct red card.

=== Injury record ===
N	P	Nat.	Name	Type	Status	Source	Match	Inj. Date	Ret. Date
33	DF	(Greece)	Giannis Kiliaras	Muscle strain		Ergotelis.gr	vs Platanias	28 October 2019	25 November 2019
20	FW	(Greece)	Giannis Iatroudis	Anterior cruciate ligament rupture of the left foot		Ergotelis.gr	vs PAS Giannina	4 November 2019	April–May 2020
33	DF	(Greece)	Giannis Kiliaras	Medial collateral ligament swelling of the knee		Ergotelis.gr	vs Doxa Drama	14 December 2019	17 January 2020
27	FW	(Belgium)	Charles Kwateng	Patellar tendon rupture of the right foot		Ergotelis.gr	vs Chania	24 December 2019	June-August 2020
21	MF	(Ghana)	Albert Bruce	Quadricep strain		Ergotelis.gr	vs PAS Giannina	26 January 2019	12 March 2020
33	DF	(Greece)	Giannis Kiliaras	Ankle cracking of the left foot		Ergotelis.gr	vs Platanias	2 March 2020	September 2020

- Player is injured
- Player has recovered from injury
Last updated: 2 March 2020
Source: Ergotelis FC
