= 2018–19 Ergotelis F.C. season =

Season of a Greek football club

Ergotelis
2018–19 season
- Chairman: Maged Samy
- Manager: Nikki Papavasiliou (29 May 2018–Present)
- Stadium: Pankritio Stadium, Heraklion
- Football League: 4th
- Greek Cup: Quarter-finals
- Top goalscorer: League: Joseph Efford (11 goals); All: Joseph Efford (13 goals)
Home colours	Away colours	Third colours

The 2018–19 season is Ergotelis' 89th season in existence and 12th overall in the Football League, the second tier of the Greek football league system. It is the second consecutive season of the club in the competition since the club's latest promotion from the Gamma Ethniki. The club also participates in the Greek Cup, entering the competition in the Third Round. The contents of this article cover club activities from 1 June 2018 until 18 May 2019.

Following the departure of Takis Gonias for Wadi Degla at the end of the previous season and his replacement with Cypriot manager Nikki Papavasiliou, Ergotelis impressed with their performance in the Greek Cup, where they managed to advance to the Round of 16 despite being drawn in the same group with Super League clubs such PAOK and Aris. They went on to eliminate local Super League rival OFI in the knock-out phase to eventually make it to the quarter-finals for the first time since 1986, matching the club's best-ever performance in the competition.

== Players ==
Summer acquisition
Winter acquisition

No.	Name	Nationality	Position (s)	Date of birth (age)	Signed from	Notes
Goalkeepers
1	Dimitrios Katsimitros	(Greece)	GK	12 June 1997 (21)	(Cyprus) Anorthosis Famagusta	
31	Manolis Kalogerakis	(Greece)	GK	12 March 1992 (27)	(Greece) Apollon Pontus	
40	Giorgos Tzelepis	(Greece)	GK	12 November 1999 (19)	(Greece) Xanthi	
Defenders
4	Konstantinos Oikonomou	(Greece) (Hungary)	CB	16 March 1996 (23)	Free agent	
5	Christos Batzios (C)	(Greece)	CB	15 October 1991 (27)	(Greece) Kavala	
8	Kyriakos Mazoulouxis	(Greece)	CB	1 May 1997 (22)	(Belgium) Lierse	
15	Dimitris Voutsas	(Greece)	CB / LB	20 May 2000 (19)	(Greece) PAOK U−20	
22	Patrick Bahanack	(Cameroon)	CB	3 August 1997 (21)	(France) Reims	On loan
2	Konstantinos Provydakis	(Greece)	RB	21 May 1996 (23)	(Greece) Irodotos	
12	Stelios Labakis	(Greece)	RB	12 June 1992 (26)	(Greece) Trikala	
33	Giannis Kiliaras	(Greece)	LB	9 June 1988 (30)	(Greece) OFI	
Midfielders
21	Albert Bruce	(Ghana)	CM	30 December 1993 (25)	(Greece) Panegialios	
23	Giannis Boutsakis	(Greece)	CM	8 February 1994 (25)	(Greece) Atsalenios	
99	Konstantinos Chatzidimpas	(Greece)	CM	12 May 1999 (20)	(Greece) PAOK U−20	
10	Antonis Bourselis (VC)	(Greece)	AM	6 July 1994 (24)	(Greece) OFI	
17	Oresti Kacurri	(Albania)	AM	25 February 1998 (21)	Youth system	
38	Ilias Tselios	(Greece)	AM	6 October 1997 (21)	(Greece) AEK Athens	On loan
88	Dimitris Grontis	(Greece)	AM	21 August 1994 (24)	(Greece) Aittitos Spata	
Forwards
11	Manolis Rovithis (2nd VC)	(Greece)	LW	16 September 1992 (26)	(Greece) Sparti	
27	Charles Kwateng	(Belgium) (Ghana)	RW	27 May 1997 (22)	(Belgium) Lierse	
7	Giorgos Manousakis	(Greece)	CF	10 April 1998 (21)	Youth system	
9	Joseph Efford	(United States)	CF	29 August 1996 (22)	Free agent	
19	Antonis Stathopoulos	(Greece)	CF	23 February 1998 (21)	(Greece) PAOK U−20	
20	Giannis Iatroudis	(Greece)	CF / AM	2 February 1999 (20)	Youth system	
29	Antonis Kapnidis	(Greece)	CF	15 August 1992 (26)	(Greece) Doxa Drama	

=== The following players have departed in mid-season ===
44	Chrysovalantis Kozoronis	(Greece)	DM	3 August 1992 (26)	Free agent	Released.
18	Georgios Chaniotakis	(Greece)	GK	23 January 1995 (24)	Youth system	Released.
77	Christos Antoniou	(Greece)	LW	14 February 1998 (21)	(Greece) AEK Athens	Loan return.
–	Georgios Lydakis	(Greece)	CF / RW	9 January 1997 (22)	(Greece) Atsalenios	Released.
14	Issahaku Yakubu	(Ghana)	LB	17 June 1994 (24)	(Belgium) Lierse	Transferred out.
6	Vasilis Vogiatzis	(Greece)	DM	10 January 1996 (23)	Youth system	Loaned out.
22	Nikolaos Patas	(Greece)	CB	19 January 1997 (22)	(Greece) Kallithea	Released.

=== Out of team ===
Hugo Cuypers	(Belgium)	CF	7 February 1997 (22)	(Belgium) Standard Liège	AWOL since 17 July 2018.

Note: Flags indicate national team as has been defined under FIFA eligibility rules. Players and Managers may hold more than one non-FIFA nationality.

Head coach	Captain	Kit manufacturer	Shirt sponsor
(Cyprus) Nikki Papavasiliou	(Greece) Christos Batzios	(United States) Capelli Sport	(Greece) Vitex

== Transfers ==
Winter Transfer Window

=== In ===
Squad #	Position	Player	Transferred from	Fee	Date	Ref
−	FW	(Greece) Georgios Lydakis	(Greece) Atsalenios	Loan return	1 June 2018	
19	FW	(Greece) Antonis Stathopoulos	(Greece) PAOK U−20	Free	29 June 2018	
14	DF	(Ghana) Issahaku Yakubu	(Belgium) Lierse	Free	6 July 2018	
31	GK	(Greece) Manolis Kalogerakis	(Greece) Apollon Pontus	Free	9 July 2018	
15	DF	(Greece) Dimitris Voutsas	(Greece) PAOK U−20	Free	11 July 2018	
29	FW	(Greece) Antonis Kapnidis	(Greece) Doxa Drama	Free	23 July 2018	
38	MF	(Greece) Ilias Tselios	(Greece) AEK Athens	Loan extension	25 July 2018	
77	FW	(Greece) Christos Antoniou	(Greece) AEK Athens	Loan	25 July 2018	
27	FW	(Belgium) (Ghana) Charles Kwateng	(Belgium) Lierse	Free	27 July 2018	
99	MF	(Greece) Konstantinos Chatzidimpas	(Greece) PAOK U−20	Free	31 August 2018	
44	MF	(Greece) Chrysovalantis Kozoronis	Free agent	Free	13 September 2018	
88	MF	(Greece) Dimitris Grontis	(Greece) Aittitos Spata	Free	4 January 2018	
40	GK	(Greece) Giorgos Tzelepis	(Greece) Xanthi	Free	10 January 2018	
2	DF	(Greece) Konstantinos Provydakis	(Greece) Irodotos	Free	11 January 2018	
33	DF	(Greece) Giannis Kiliaras	(Greece) OFI	Free	18 January 2018	
22	DF	(Cameroon) Patrick Bahanack	(France) Reims	Loan	31 January 2018	

==== Promoted from youth system ====
Squad #	Position	Player	Date	Signed Until	Ref
17	MF	(Albania) Oresti Kacurri	15 June 2018	30 June 2023	

Total spending: €0

=== Out ===
Position	Player	Transferred To	Fee	Date	Ref
DF	(Greece) Manolis Nikolakakis	(Greece) Kallithea	Free	18 June 2018	
MF	(Greece) Georgios Angelopoulos	(Greece) Panathinaikos	Loan return	20 June 2018	
MF	(Albania) Zani Kurti	(Greece) Episkopi	Free	20 June 2018	
DF	(Greece) Athanasios Kyrialanis	(Greece) Niki Volos	Free	20 June 2018	
DF	(Greece) Konstantinos Kyriakidis	(Greece) Almopos Aridaea	Free	20 June 2018	
GK	(Greece) Panagiotis Ladas	(Greece) Kallithea	Free	20 June 2018	
FW	(Greece) Nikolaos Stamatakos	(Greece) Trikala	Free	20 June 2018	
DF	(Canada) (Greece) James Stamopoulos	(Greece) Panachaiki	Free	20 June 2018	
MF	(Greece) Vasilis Bouzas	(Egypt) Wadi Degla	▲ Undisclosed	30 June 2018	
MF	(Greece) Ilias Tselios	(Greece) AEK Athens	Loan return	30 June 2018	
DF	(Greece) Apostolos Doulgerakis	(Greece) Irodotos	Free	3 July 2018	
MF	(Greece) Chrysovalantis Kozoronis	(Romania) Petrolul	Free	4 January 2019	
GK	(Greece) Georgios Chaniotakis	(Greece) Episkopi	Free	4 January 2019	
FW	(Greece) Christos Antoniou	(Greece) AEK Athens	Loan return	7 January 2019	
FW	(Greece) Georgios Lydakis	(Greece) Poros	Free	10 January 2019	
DF	(Ghana) Issahaku Yakubu	(Egypt) Wadi Degla	▲ Undisclosed	11 January 2019	
MF	(Greece) Vasilis Vogiatzis	(Greece) O.F. Ierapetra	Loan	21 January 2019	
DF	(Greece) Nikolaos Patas	(Greece) Apollon Pontus	Free	28 January 2019	

Total income: ▲ Undisclosed
Expenditure: ▲ Undisclosed

== Kit ==
2018−19

Supplier: Capelli
Sponsor(s): Vitex

Home	Away	Third

Source: ergotelisfc.gr

Variations

Supplier: Capelli
Sponsor(s): Vitex

Away

Source: ergotelisfc.gr

Friendlies

Supplier: Capelli
Sponsor(s): No

Friendlies #1	Friendlies #2	Friendlies #3

Source: ergotelis.gr

== Pre-season and friendlies ==
=== Pre-season friendlies ===
Win Draw Loss

4 August 2018 Friendly	Ergotelis (Greece)	3–0	(Greece) Giouchtas	Heraklion, Crete, Greece
18:30 EEST	Bourselis 26'; Batzios 28'; Efford 33'	Report		Stadium: Pankritio Stadium

11 August 2018 Friendly	Episkopi (Greece)	0–2	(Greece) Ergotelis	Lappa, Crete, Greece
18:00 EEST		Report	Efford 9'; Kapnidis 36' (pen.)	Stadium: Gallos Stadium

14 August 2018 Friendly	Ergotelis (Greece)	2–0	(Greece) O.F. Ierapetra	Heraklion, Crete, Greece
18:00 EEST	Topouzis 52' (o.g.); Bourselis 73'	Report		Stadium: Pankritio Stadium

18 August 2018 Friendly	OFI (Greece)	2–1	(Greece) Ergotelis	Heraklion, Crete, Greece
19:00 EEST	Kyriakidis 24'; Sassi 72'	Report	Antoniou 34'	Stadium: Theodoros Vardinogiannis Stadium

22 August 2018 Friendly	Irodotos (Greece)	1–3	(Greece) Ergotelis	Nea Alikarnassos, Crete, Greece
18:00 EEST	Konstantinidis 44'	Report	Efford 18', 22'; Boutsakis 30'	Stadium: Nea Alikarnassos Municipal Stadium

1 September 2018 Friendly	Ergotelis (Greece)	2–0	(Greece) AO Chania−Kissamikos	Heraklion, Crete, Greece
18:00 EEST	Boutsakis 22'; Tselios 28'	Report		Stadium: Pankritio Stadium

2 September 2018 Friendly	Ergotelis (Greece)	2–1	(Greece) Atsalenios	Heraklion, Crete, Greece
18:00 EEST	Iatroudis 11'; Kwateng 24' (pen.)	Report	Patiniotis 90'	Stadium: Pankritio Stadium

9 September 2018 Friendly	Ergotelis (Greece)	0–0	(Greece) Panthiraikos	Nea Alikarnassos, Crete, Greece
17:45 EEST		Report		Stadium: Nea Alikarnassos Municipal Stadium

=== Mid-season friendlies ===
Win Draw Loss

22 September 2018 Friendly	Ergotelis (Greece)	2–1	(Greece) Giouchtas	Heraklion, Crete, Greece
16:30 EEST	Bourselis 44'; Efford 84'	Report	Saklamakis 46'	Stadium: Pankritio Stadium

7 October 2018 Friendly	Platanias (Greece)	0–0	(Greece) Ergotelis	Chania, Crete, Greece
17:00 EEST		Report		Stadium: Perivolia Municipal Stadium

13 October 2018 Friendly	OFI (Greece)	0–1	(Greece) Ergotelis	Heraklion, Crete, Greece
11:00 EEST		Report	Mazoulouxis 22'	Stadium: Vardinogiannis Athletic Centre

20 October 2018 Friendly	Ergotelis (Greece)	2–0	(Greece) Atsalenios	Heraklion, Crete, Greece
16:30 EEST	Bourselis 67'; Rovithis 86'	Report		Stadium: Pankritio Stadium

== Competitions ==
=== Overview ===
Competition	Started round	Current position / round	Final position / round	First match	Last match
Football League Greece	1	4th / 30	4th / 30	28 October 2018	5 May 2019
Greek Football Cup	Third Round	Quarter-finals	Quarter-finals	16 September 2018	27 February 2019

Last updated: 5 May 2019

== League table ==
Pos	Team	Pld	W	D	L	GF	GA	GD	Pts	Promotion or relegation
2	Platanias	30	15	10	5	53	22	+31	55	Qualification for the promotion play-off
3	Apollon Larissa (Note: Apollon Larissa were deducted three points for failing to pass the economic oversight process of the HFF.)	30	16	9	5	44	27	+17	54	Eligibility for Super League 2
4	Ergotelis (Note: Ergotelis were deducted three points for failing to pass the economic oversight process of the HFF.)	30	15	6	9	48	28	+20	48	Eligibility for Super League 2
5	Panachaiki	30	12	12	6	32	25	+7	48	Eligibility for Super League 2
6	Chania	30	13	7	10	40	24	+16	46	Eligibility for Super League 2

Source: Football League
Rules for classification: 1) Points; 2) Head-to-head points; 3) Head-to-head goal difference; 4) Goals scored; 5) Goals against; 6) Play-offs (neutral ground, only used if needed to decide teams for promotion or relegation).

== Results summary^{1} ==
Overall								Home						Away					
Pld	W	D	L	GF	GA	GD	Pts	W	D	L	GF	GA	GD	W	D	L	GF	GA	GD
30	15	6	9	48	29	+19	48	10	3	2	32	13	+19	5	3	7	16	16	0

1. On 3 May 2019, the club was deducted three points for delayed transfer registration, thus failing to meet all criteria of the HFF financial oversight process.

Last updated: 5 May 2019.
Source: Competitive matches

=== Results by Round ===
Round	1	2	3	4	5	6	7	8	9	10	11	12	13	14	15	16	17	18	19	20	21	22	23	24	25	26	27	28	29	30
Ground	H	A	A	H	A	H	A	H	A	H	H	A	H	A	H	A	H	H	A	H	A	H	A	H	A	A	H	A	H	A
Result	W	W	W	W	D	D	L	L	L	W	L	L	W	L	W	L	W	W	D	W	L	W	L	W	W	D	D	W	D	W
Position	3	2	2	1	2	2	4	5	5	5	5	5	5	9	6	7	7	7	7	7	7	7	7	7	4	5	5	4	5	4

Updated to match(es) played on 5 May 2019. Source: footballleaguenews.gr
A = Away; H = Home; W = Win; D = Draw; L = Loss

=== Matches ===
Win Draw Loss Postponed

28 October 2018 1	Ergotelis	2–0	Apollon Pontus	Heraklion, Crete, Greece
15:00 EEST	Mazoulouxis (yellow card) 60'; Tselios 72'; Efford 77'	Report	Samaras (yellow card) 51'; Georgiadis (yellow card) 56'; Dimitriadis (yellow card) 63'; Amarantidis (yellow card) 80'	Stadium: Pankritio Stadium; Referee: Spyridon Kolytas (Lasithi)

4 November 2018 2	AO Chania Kissamikos	1–2	Ergotelis	Chania, Crete, Greece
15:00 EET	Karagiannis (yellow card) 79' (yellow-red card) 81'; Arnarellis 90+4'	Report	Batzios 14'; Boutsakis (yellow card) 60'; Yakubu 78'; Kalogerakis (yellow card) 81'	Stadium: Perivolia Municipal Stadium; Referee: Konstantinos Katikos (Athens)

10 November 2018 3	Sparta	0–2	Ergotelis	Sparta, Laconia, Greece
15:00 EET	Tientcheu (yellow card) 18'; Konstantinopoulos (yellow card) 20'; Vlachomitros (yellow card) 65'; Fragoulis (yellow card) 80'	Report	Tselios 21' (pen.); Bourselis 75'	Stadium: Sparta Municipal Stadium; Referee: Eleni Antoniou (East Attica)

17 November 2018 4	Ergotelis	3–0	Trikala	Heraklion, Crete, Greece
15:00 EET	Bruce (yellow card) 27'; Kozoronis 37' (pen.); Boutsakis 53'; Iatroudis 76'; Bourselis (yellow card) 78'	Report	Tsiaras (yellow card) 5'; Gotovos (yellow card) 60'	Stadium: Pankritio Stadium; Referee: Konstantinos Bakoyannis (Athens)

21 November 2018 5	Volos	1–1	Ergotelis	Volos, Magnesia, Greece
15:00 EET	Lucas García 10', (yellow card) 22'; Penta (yellow card) 77'	Report	Boutsakis (yellow card) 58'; Bruce 90+1'	Stadium: Neapoli Municipal Stadium; Referee: Mattheos Vournelis (Macedonia)

25 November 2018 6	Ergotelis	2–2	Platanias	Heraklion, Crete, Greece
15:00 EET	Iatroudis 9'; Kozoronis (yellow card) 17'; Mazoulouxis 49'; Bruce (yellow card) 59'; Tselios (yellow card) 64'	Report	Papanikolaou (yellow card) 17'; Pozatzidis (yellow card) 19'; Oues (yellow card) 38'; Bianconi 85', 90+2'	Stadium: Pankritio Stadium; Referee: Dimitrios Karantonis (Imathia)

2 December 2018 7	Irodotos	1–0	Ergotelis	Nea Alikarnassos, Crete, Greece
15:00 EET	Gialousis 5', (yellow card) 45'; Kasapakis (yellow card) 47'; Mako (yellow card) 48'; Machado (yellow card) 57'; Kasmeridis (yellow card) 83'	Report	Bruce (yellow card) 40'	Stadium: Nea Alikarnassos Municipal Stadium; Referee: Fotios Polychronis (Pieria)

8 December 2018 8	Ergotelis	1–2	Kerkyra	Nea Alikarnassos, Crete, Greece
15:00 EET	Efford 59'	Report	Linardos 51', 71', (yellow card) 53'; Sandravelis (yellow card) 83'	Stadium: Nea Alikarnassos Municipal Stadium; Referee: Angelos Aggelakis (Macedonia)

15 December 2018 9	Aiginiakos	1–0	Ergotelis	Aiginio, Pieria, Greece
15:00 EET	Piastopoulos (yellow card) 21'; Polyzos 14'; Perić (yellow card) 80'; Petrousis (yellow card) 80'; Laskaris (yellow card) 84'; Karagiozis (yellow card) 87'	Report	Efford (yellow card) 51'; Iatroudis (yellow card) 87'	Stadium: Aiginio Municipal Stadium; Referee: Lembros Bekiaris (Karditsa)

23 December 2018 10	Ergotelis	2–1	Panachaiki	Heraklion, Crete, Greece
15:00 EET	Bourselis (yellow card) 34'; Batzios (yellow card) 65'; Kwateng 80'; Kapnidis 83'; Tselios (yellow card) 90'; Iatroudis (yellow card) 90+2'; Katsimitros (yellow card) 90+3'	Report	Eleftheriadis 2', (yellow card) 37'; Loumpardeas (yellow card) 36'; Moraitis (yellow card) 39'; Kynigopoulos (yellow card) 51'; Kapoutaglis (yellow card) 60'	Stadium: Pankritio Stadium; Referee: Dimitiros Maloutas (Imathia)

5 January 2019 11	Ergotelis	1–2	Apollon Larissa	Heraklion, Crete, Greece
15:00 EET	Yakubu (yellow card) 37'; Efford 72'; Iatroudis (yellow card) 72'	Report	Tasioulis 5', (yellow card) 13'; Souliotis (yellow card) 51'; Lucão 68', (yellow card) 78'; Kourtesiotis (yellow card) 73'; Mantzaris (yellow card) 89'	Stadium: Pankritio Stadium; Referee: Aristeidis Vatsios (West Attica)

13 January 2019 12	Iraklis	2–1	Ergotelis	Thessaloniki, Macedonia, Greece
15:00 EET	Dounis 23', (yellow card) 74'; Kostoulas (yellow card) 44'; Ziabaris (yellow card) 71'; Perrone 83'; Pasas (yellow card) 90+3'	Report	Mazoulouxis 42'; Bruce (yellow card) 64'	Stadium: Kaftanzoglio Stadium; Referee: Thanasis Dragousis (Kilkis)

19 January 2019 13	Ergotelis	3–1	Aittitos Spata	Heraklion, Crete, Greece
15:00 EET	Efford 23' (pen.), (yellow card) 64'; Kwateng 36'; Tselios (yellow card) 55'; Mazoulouxis (yellow card) 28' (yellow-red card) 63'; Batzios (yellow card) 64'; Boutsakis (yellow card) 68'; Rovithis 75'; Provydakis (yellow card) 77'	Report	Lamprou (yellow card) 3'; Kollaras (yellow card) 40' (yellow-red card) 90'; Stamatakis 54'; Iraklis (yellow card) 65'	Stadium: Pankritio Stadium; Referee: Petros Tsagarakis (Chania)

27 January 2019 14	Karaiskakis	1–0	Ergotelis	Arta, Arta, Greece
15:00 EET	Tzioras 36'; Kakko (yellow card) 43'; Panagiotou (yellow card) 60'; Chousos (yellow card) 80'	Report	Tselios (yellow card) 32'	Stadium: Agioi Anargiroi Municipal Stadium; Referee: Spyros Zampalas (Epirus)

3 February 2019 15	Ergotelis	2–0	Doxa Drama	Heraklion, Crete, Greece
15:00 EET	Kwateng (yellow card) 53'; Rovithis 73', (yellow card) 85'; Efford 90+4' (pen.)	Report	Patralis (yellow card) 60'; Petavrakis (yellow card) 83'	Stadium: Pankritio Stadium; Referee: Antonis Vlachos (East Attica)

11 February 2019 16	Apollon Pontus	3–0	Ergotelis	Kalamaria, Macedonia, Greece
15:00 EET	Olaitan 30' (pen.); Brito (yellow card) 41'; Pourtoulidis (yellow card) 43'; Kyvelidis 57'; Hasomeris (yellow card) 62'; Sountoura (yellow card) 82', (goal) 83'	Report	Koiliaras (yellow card) 36' (yellow-red card) 73'; Kapnidis (yellow card) 40'	Stadium: Kalamaria Stadium; Referee: Tsopouridis (Xanthi)

16 February 2019 17	Ergotelis	1–0	AO Chania Kissamikos	Heraklion, Crete, Greece
15:00 EET	Bahanack (yellow card) 22'; Tselios 46'; Efford (yellow card) 90+4'	Report	Papachristos (yellow card) 25'; Zioulis (yellow card) 35'; Moumin (yellow card) 40'; Saliakas (yellow card) 55'	Stadium: Pankritio Stadium; Referee: Spyridon Kolytas (Lasithi)

23 February 2019 18^{1}	Ergotelis	3–0 (w/o)	Sparta	Heraklion, Crete, Greece
15:00 EET	Provydakis (yellow card) 26'; Bahanack (yellow card) 40'; Batzios 67'; Iatroudis (yellow card) 90+5'	1–1; Report	Lolos (yellow card) 22'; Galvão 27' (pen.); Tientcheu (yellow card) 49'; Kenourgios (yellow card) 54'	Stadium: Pankritio Stadium; Referee: Alexandros Tsakalidis (Chalkidiki)

2 March 2019 19	Trikala	1–1	Ergotelis	Trikala, Trikala, Greece
15:00 EET	Cissé 16'; Tsiaras (yellow card) 25'; Andronic (yellow card) 53'; Triantafyllakos (yellow card) 72'	Report	Boutsakis (yellow card) 5' (yellow-red card) 13'; Efford (yellow card) 28'; Ikonomou (yellow card) 43'; Bourselis 50'; Tselios (yellow card) 75'; Grontis (yellow card) 86'	Stadium: Trikala Municipal Stadium; Referee: Dimitrios Maloutas (Imathia)

6 March 2019 20	Ergotelis	2–0	Volos	Heraklion, Crete, Greece
15:00 EET	Bruce (yellow card) 11'; Ikonomou (yellow card) 33'; Rovithis 53'; Efford 63'; Bourselis (yellow card) 90+1'	Report	Dentakis (yellow card) 22'	Stadium: Pankritio Stadium; Referee: Konstantinos Andrianos (Achaea)

10 March 2019 21	Platanias	1–0	Ergotelis	Chania, Crete, Greece
15:00 EET	Majkić (yellow card) 4'; Loukinas 45'; Pozatzidis (yellow card) 49'; Lazić (yellow card) 68'; Gaqollari (yellow card) 75'	Report	Manousakis (yellow card) 63'; Bahanack (yellow card) 80'	Stadium: Perivolia Municipal Stadium; Referee: Aristedis Vatsios (West Attica)

17 March 2019 22	Ergotelis	4–1	Irodotos	Heraklion, Crete, Greece
17:00 EET	Manousakis 10'; Andreou 25' (o.g.); Efford (yellow card) 42'; Mazoulouxis (yellow card) 63'; Rovithis 72'; Batzios (yellow card) 70' (yellow-red card) 76'; Bahanack 90+2'	Report	Nyktaris (yellow card) 9' (yellow-red card) 13'; Moukidis 88'	Stadium: Pankritio Stadium; Referee: Petros Tsagkarakis (Chania)

23 March 2019 23	Kerkyra	2–1	Ergotelis	Corfu, Kerkyra, Greece
15:00 EET	Kontos (yellow card) 4'; Mota 32', (yellow card) 90+3'; Kouros (yellow card) 37'; Siatravanis 55'; Theodorakis (yellow card) 59'	Report	Efford 1'; Tselios (yellow card) 23'; Rovithis (yellow card) 59'; Boutsakis (yellow card) 66'	Stadium: Kerkyra Stadium; Referee: Mattheos Vournelis (Macedonia)

27 March 2019 24	Ergotelis	4–1	Aiginiakos	Heraklion, Crete, Greece
15:00 EET	Efford 44', 90+1' (pen.); Rovithis 70'; Manousakis 73'	Report	Sofianis 84'; Zannakis (yellow card) 90'	Stadium: Pankritio Stadium; Referee: Angelos Bakoyannis (Athens)

31 March 2019 25	Panachaiki	0–1	Ergotelis	Agyia, Patras, Greece
16:00 EEST	Plegas (yellow card) 29'	Report	Bruce (yellow card) 48'; Ikonomou (yellow card) 58'; Kwateng 86'	Stadium: Kostas Davourlis Stadium; Referee: Konstantinos Perrakis (Athens)

7 April 2019 26	Apollon Larissa	2–2	Ergotelis	Larissa, Larissa, Greece
16:00 EEST	Brambilla 39'; Litenas (yellow card) 65'; Chatzis 90'	Report	Manousakis 10'; Batzios (yellow card) 48'; Tselios 68'	Stadium: Apollon Stadium; Referee: Andreas Gkamaris (Athens)

14 April 2019 27	Ergotelis	1–1	Iraklis	Heraklion, Crete, Greece
16:00 EEST	Mazoulouxis 79'; Rovithis (yellow card) 90+1'	Report	Katharios (yellow card) 14'; Dounis (yellow card) 45'; Cleyton 83'	Stadium: Pankritio Stadium; Referee: Alexandros Dragatis (East Attica)

– 28^{2}	Aittitos Spata	0–3 (w/o)	Ergotelis	–
–				Stadium: – Referee: –

22 April 2019 29	Ergotelis	1–1	Karaiskakis	Heraklion, Crete, Greece
15:00 EEST	Bahanack (yellow card) 27'; Mazoulouxis (yellow card) 57' (yellow-red card) 76'; Rovithis 70'; Iatroudis (yellow card) 85'	Report	Chousos (yellow card) 41'; Kakko 62', (yellow card) 63'; Vukmirović (yellow card) 73'; Rodríguez (yellow card) 79' (yellow-red card) 90+2'	Stadium: Pankritio Stadium; Referee: Fotios Ntaoulas (West Attica)

5 May 2019 30	Doxa Drama	0–2	Ergotelis	Drama, Drama, Greece
15:00 EEST	Doumtsios (yellow card) 27'; Petavrakis (yellow card) 42'; Rougalas (yellow card) 58'	Report	Efford 45', 82'; Voutsas (yellow card) 70'	Stadium: Doxa Drama Stadium; Referee: Athanasios Dragousis (Kilkis)

1. Matchdays 18 vs. Sparti was awarded to Ergotelis (3−0), due to Sparti fielding six foreign players at once during the match.
2. Matchdays 28 vs. Aittitos Spata was awarded to Ergotelis (3−0), due to Aittitos Spata being expelled from the League.

== Greek Cup ==
=== Third Round ===
Home team	Score	Away team
Ermis Amyntaio	0–3	Ergotelis (Q)

==== Matches ====
Win Draw Loss

16 September 2018 Third Round	Ermis Amyntaio	0–3	Ergotelis	Florina, Florina, Greece
16:30 EEST		Report	Efford 17'; Iatroudis 58', 68'	Stadium: Florina Municipal Stadium; Referee: Dimitrios Karantonis (Imathia)

=== Group stage ===
==== Group D ====
Pos	Team	Pld	W	D	L	GF	GA	GD	Pts	Qualification	PAOK	ERG	ARIS	AIT
1	PAOK	3	2	1	0	9	2	+7	7	Round of 16		—	1–1	—
2	Ergotelis	3	1	1	1	5	5	0	4	Round of 16	1–2		3–2	—
3	Aris	3	1	1	1	5	5	0	4		—	—		2–1
4	Aittitos Spata	3	0	1	2	2	9	−7	1		0–6	1–1	—	

Source: epo.gr
Rules for classification: 1. Points 2. Head-to-head points 3. Head-to-head goal difference 4. Goals scored 5. Goals against 6. Play-offs (neutral ground).

==== Matches ====
Win Draw Loss

26 September 2018 1	Aittitos Spata	1–1	Ergotelis	Spata, East Attica, Greece
16:30 EEST	Kasneci (yellow card) 25'; Mangas (yellow card) 47'; Moustakis (yellow card) 67'; Maroukakis (yellow card) 78'; Grontis 80'; Stamatakis (yellow card) 90'	Report	Kapnidis 42'; Tselios (yellow card) 61'; Bruce (yellow card) 83'	Stadium: Spata Municipal Stadium; Referee: Fotis Ntaoulas (West Attica)

14 November 2018 2	Ergotelis	1–2	PAOK	Heraklion, Crete, Greece
15:00 EET	Kozoronis (yellow card) 61'; Iatroudis 68'; Boutsakis (yellow card) 90+3'	Report	Biseswar 10'; Jabá (yellow card) 63'; Wernbloom 79'	Stadium: Pankritio Stadium; Referee: Stefanos Koubarakis (Thrace)

20 December 2018	Ergotelis	3–2	Aris Thessaloniki	Heraklion, Crete, Greece
17:15 EET	Bourselis 41'; Iatroudis 50'; Efford 53'; Bruce (yellow card) 72'; Tselios (yellow card) 76'	Report	Diguiny 57', 73' (pen.)	Stadium: Pankritio Stadium; Referee: Petros Tsagkarakis (Chania)

=== Round of 16 ===
Team 1	Agg.	Team 2	1st leg	2nd leg
Ergotelis (Q)	2–2	OFI	1–1	1−1

Notes:
1. Ergotelis won 3–4 on penalties.

==== Matches ====
Win Draw Loss

8 January 2019 1st Leg	Ergotelis	1–1	OFI	Heraklion, Crete, Greece
19:30 EET	Boutsakis (yellow card) 32'; Iatroudis (yellow card) 37', (goal) 66'; Mazoulouxis (yellow card) 86'	Report	Nastos 28'; Korovesis (yellow card) 70'	Stadium: Pankritio Stadium; Referee: Georgios Vreskas (Pieria)

24 January 2019 2nd Leg	OFI	1–1 (2–2 agg.)	Ergotelis	Heraklion, Crete, Greece
17:15 EET	Koutsianikoulis (yellow card) 31' (yellow-red card) 31'; Deligiannidis (yellow card) 35'; Neira 44' (pen.), (yellow card) 106'; Sassi (yellow card) 67'; Nastos (yellow card) 76'	Report	Boutsakis 23'; Ikonomou (yellow card) 43'; Bruce (yellow card) 61'; Batzios (yellow card) 61'; Rovithis (yellow card) 68'; Bourselis (yellow card) 73'; Kacurri (yellow card) 74'; Labakis (yellow card) 92'	Stadium: Theodoros Vardinogiannis Stadium; Referee: Aristomenis Koutsiaftis (Arta)
	Penalties
	Sassi (penalty scored); Potouridis (penalty missed); Kyriakidis (penalty missed); Korovesis (penalty scored); Vouho (penalty scored)		Iatroudis (penalty scored); Batzios (penalty missed); Tselios (penalty scored); Efford (penalty scored); Rovithis (penalty scored)

=== Quarter-finals ===
Team 1	Agg.	Team 2	1st leg	2nd leg
Ergotelis	1–5	Asteras Tripolis (Q)	0−1	1–4

==== Matches ====
Win Draw Loss

7 February 2019 1st Leg	Ergotelis	0–1	Asteras Tripolis	Heraklion, Crete, Greece
17:00 EET	Mazoulouxis (yellow card) 58'; Koiliaras (yellow card) 69'	Report	Rolle 50'	Stadium: Pankritio Stadium; Referee: Anastasios Papapetrou (Athens)

27 February 2019 2nd leg	Asteras Tripolis	4–1 (5–1 agg.)	Ergotelis	Tripoli, Greece
17:15 EET	Bastianos 9'; Bellocq (yellow card) 27'; Pasalidis (yellow card) 50'; Aravidis 79'; Kaltsas 89'; Fernández 90+3'	Report	Iatroudis 72'; Bruce (yellow card) 85'	Stadium: Theodoros Kolokotronis Stadium; Referee: Aristomenis Koutsiaftis (Arta)

== Statistics ==
=== Squad statistics ===
As of 5 May 2019

Appearances denote players in the starting lineup, with the numbers in parentheses denoting appearances as substitute.

No.	Name	Football League		Greek Cup		Total	
No.	Name	Apps	Goals	Apps	Goals	Apps	Goals
Goalkeepers
1	(Greece) Dimitrios Katsimitros	18	0	4	0	22	0
31	(Greece) Manolis Kalogerakis	11	0	3	0	14	0
40	(Greece) Georgios Tzelepis	0 (1)	0	0	0	0 (1)	0
Defenders
2	(Greece) Konstantinos Providakis	2 (2)	0	0 (1)	0	2 (3)	0
4	(Greece) Konstantinos Ikonomou	15 (5)	0	7	0	22 (5)	0
5	(Greece) Christos Batzios	28	2	8	0	36	2
8	(Greece) Kyriakos Mazoulouxis	21 (1)	3	5 (1)	0	26 (2)	3
12	(Greece) Stelios Labakis	3 (3)	0	1 (1)	0	4 (4)	0
15	(Greece) Dimitris Voutsas	2	0	0	0	2	0
22	(Cameroon) Patrick Bahanack	13	1	1	0	14	1
33	(Greece) Giannis Koiliaras	5	0	2	0	7	0
Midfielders
10	(Greece) Antonis Bourselis	21 (5)	2	6 (1)	1	27 (6)	3
17	(Albania) Oresti Kacurri	3 (5)	0	1 (1)	0	4 (6)	0
21	(Ghana) Albert Bruce	28	1	7 (1)	0	35 (1)	1
23	(Greece) Giannis Boutsakis	14 (11)	1	5 (1)	1	19 (12)	2
38	(Greece) Ilias Tselios	27	4	8	0	35	4
88	(Greece) Dimitris Grontis	4 (5)	0	1 (1)	0	5 (6)	0
99	(Greece) Konstantinos Chatzidimpas	0 (1)	0	0	0	0 (1)	0
Forwards
7	(Greece) Georgios Manousakis	10 (1)	3	0	0	10 (1)	3
9	(United States) Joseph Efford	27	11	8	2	35	13
11	(Greece) Manolis Rovithis	4 (14)	6	1 (3)	0	5 (17)	6
19	(Greece) Antonis Stathopoulos	2 (7)	0	0 (1)	0	2 (8)	0
20	(Greece) Giannis Iatroudis	25 (1)	2	8	6	33 (1)	8
27	(Belgium) Charles Kwateng	13 (8)	3	3 (1)	0	16 (9)	3
29	(Greece) Antonis Kapnidis	5 (13)	1	4 (3)	1	9 (16)	2
Players transferred/loaned out during the season
18	(Greece) Georgios Chaniotakis	0	0	1	0	1	0
44	(Greece) Chrysovalantis Kozoronis	8	1	2 (1)	0	10 (1)	1
77	(Greece) Christos Antoniou	0 (1)	0	0 (1)	0	0 (2)	0
14	(Ghana) Issahaku Yakubu	10 (1)	1	5	0	15 (1)	1
6	(Greece) Vasilios Vogiatzis	0	0	0	0	0	0
22	(Greece) Nikolaos Patas	0	0	0	0	0	0

Most common lineup during Football League First Round, (4–3–3)

Most common lineup throughout the season, (4–3–3)

=== Goal scorers ===
Player has departed in mid-season

No.	Pos.	Nation	Name	Greek Football League	Greek Cup	Total
9	FW	(United States)	Joseph Efford	11	2	13
20	FW	(Greece)	Giannis Iatroudis	2	6	8
11	FW	(Greece)	Manolis Rovithis	6	0	6
38	MF	(Greece)	Ilias Tselios	4	0	4
27	FW	(Belgium) (Ghana)	Charles Kwateng	3	0	3
7	FW	(Greece)	Georgios Manousakis	3	0	3
8	DF	(Greece)	Kyriakos Mazoulouxis	3	0	3
10	MF	(Greece)	Antonis Bourselis	2	1	3
29	FW	(Greece)	Antonis Kapnidis	1	1	2
23	MF	(Greece)	Giannis Boutsakis	1	1	2
5	DF	(Greece)	Christos Batzios	1^{1}	0	1
21	MF	(Ghana)	Albert Bruce	1	0	1
22	DF	(Cameroon)	Patrick Bahanack	1	0	1
14	DF	(Ghana)	Issahaku Yakubu	1	0	1
44	MF	(Greece)	Chrysovalantis Kozoronis	1	0	1
	-	-	Opponent's own Goals	1	0	1
	-	-	Awarded	6	0	6
TOTAL				48	11	59

1. Goal scored vs. Sparti, match was awarded to Ergotelis (3−0), due to Sparti fielding six foreign players at once during the match.

Last updated: 5 May 2019
Source: Competitive matches

=== Disciplinary record ===
S	P	N	Name	Football League			Cup			Total		
S	P	N	Name	Yellow card	Yellow-red card	Red card	Yellow card	Yellow-red card	Red card	Yellow card	Yellow-red card	Red card
8	DF	(Greece)	Kyriakos Mazoulouxis	2	2	0	2	0	0	4	2	0
23	MF	(Greece)	Giannis Boutsakis	4	1	0	2	0	0	6	1	0
5	DF	(Greece)	Christos Batzios	3	1	0	1	0	0	4	1	0
33	DF	(Greece)	Giannis Kiliaras	0	1	0	1	0	0	1	1	0
21	MF	(Ghana)	Albert Bruce	6	0	0	4	0	0	10	0	0
38	MF	(Greece)	Ilias Tselios	6	0	0	2	0	0	8	0	0
20	MF	(Greece)	Giannis Iatroudis	5	0	0	1	0	0	6	0	0
9	FW	(United States)	Joseph Efford	4	0	0	0	0	0	4	0	0
22	DF	(Cameroon)	Patrick Bahanack	4	0	0	0	0	0	4	0	0
10	MF	(Greece)	Antonis Bourselis	3	0	0	1	0	0	4	0	0
4	DF	(Greece)	Konstantinos Oikonomou	3	0	0	1	0	0	4	0	0
11	FW	(Greece)	Manolis Rovithis	3	0	0	1	0	0	4	0	0
2	DF	(Greece)	Konstantinos Provydakis	2	0	0	0	0	0	2	0	0
44	MF	(Greece)	Chrysovalantis Kozoronis	1	0	0	1	0	0	2	0	0
31	GK	(Greece)	Manolis Kalogerakis	1	0	0	0	0	0	1	0	0
29	FW	(Greece)	Antonis Kapnidis	1	0	0	0	0	0	1	0	0
14	DF	(Ghana)	Issahaku Yakubu	1	0	0	0	0	0	1	0	0
1	GK	(Greece)	Dimitrios Katsimitros	1	0	0	0	0	0	1	0	0
27	FW	(Belgium)	Charles Kwateng	1	0	0	0	0	0	1	0	0
88	MF	(Greece)	Dimitris Grontis	1	0	0	0	0	0	1	0	0
7	FW	(Greece)	Georgios Manousakis	1	0	0	0	0	0	1	0	0
15	DF	(Greece)	Dimitris Voutsas	1	0	0	0	0	0	1	0	0
17	MF	(Albania)	Oresti Kacurri	0	0	0	1	0	0	1	0	0
12	DF	(Greece)	Stelios Labakis	0	0	0	1	0	0	1	0	0
TOTALS				54	5	0	19	0	0	73	5	0

Last updated: 5 May 2019
Source: Competitive matches
Ordered by (red card) , (yellow card) (yellow-red card) and (yellow card)
(yellow card) = Number of bookings; (yellow card) (yellow-red card) = Number of sending offs after a second yellow card; (red card) = Number of sending offs by a direct red card.

=== Injury record ===
N	P	Nat.	Name	Type	Status	Source	Match	Inj. Date	Ret. Date
14	FW	(Greece)	Manolis Rovithis	ACL rupture		Ergotelis.gr	vs Aris (2017–18)	12 March 2018	6 September 2018
14	FW	(Greece)	Manolis Rovithis	Knee injury		Ergotelisfc.gr	vs PAOK	14 November 2018	19 January 2019
29	FW	(Greece)	Antonis Kapnidis	Bicep pull		Ergotelisfc.gr	vs Volos	21 November 2018	2 December 2018
10	MF	(Greece)	Antonis Bourselis	Knee injury		Ergotelisfc.gr	vs Volos	21 November 2018	15 December 2018
14	DF	(Ghana)	Issahaku Yakubu	Bicep strain		Ergotelisfc.gr	vs Irodotos	2 December 2018	8 December 2018
8	DF	(Greece)	Kyriakos Mazoulouxis	Quadricep strain		Ergotelisfc.gr	Training	21 February 2018	17 March 2019
10	MF	(Greece)	Antonis Bourselis	Ankle injury		Ergotelisfc.gr	vs Karaiskakis	22 April 2019	5 May 2019

- Player is injured
- Player has recovered from injury
Last updated: 5 May 2019
Source: ergotelis.gr
