= Ilias Tselios =

Greek footballer

Personal information
- Date of birth: 6 October 1997 (age 29)
- Place of birth: Athens, Greece
- Height: 1.71 m (5 ft 7 1/2 in)
- Position: Attacking midfielder

Team information
- Current team: Panserraikos
- Number: 38

Youth career
- 2008–2016: AEK Athens

Senior career*
Years	Team	Apps	(Gls)
2014–2019	AEK Athens	3	(0)
2017	→ Lamia (loan)	0	(0)
2018–2019	→ Ergotelis (loan)	45	(6)
2019–2021	Ergotelis	44	(5)
2021–2022	Xanthi	28	(5)
2022	Volos	2	(0)
2023–2025	Chania	51	(3)
2025–2026	Kalamata	23	(5)
2026–	Panserraikos	3	(0)

International career
2013–2014	Greece U17	5	(0)
2015	Greece U18	1	(0)
2016–2017	Greece U19	2	(0)
- * Club domestic league appearances and goals as of 20 September 2026

Ilias Tselios (Greek: Ηλίας Τσέλιος; born 6 October 1997) is a Greek professional footballer who plays as an attacking midfielder for Super League 2 club Panserraikos.

== Career ==
=== AEK Athens ===
Tselios began his career at the infrastructure segments of AEK Athens, and made his senior debut against Pannaxiakos on the last matchday of the 2013–14 Gamma Ethniki season. He played for AEK's U−20 during the club's short tenure in the Football League and eventually made his Super League debut on 26 November 2016, as a late substitute for Patito Rodríguez in a 3−0 home win vs. Platanias. In total, Tselios made 4 appearances for the club in both the Super League and Cup competitions.

==== Loan moves ====
At the start of the 2017–18 season, Tselios moved to fellow Super League side Lamia on a one-year loan deal in order to get more playing time. In January 2018, Tselios returned to AEK having made no appearances for Lamia during his loan spell. He was subsequently loaned out to Football League side Ergotelis in January 2018 until the end of the season. He became instrumental in Ergotelis' Second Round push out of the relegation zone, making a total of 18 appearances, all as a starter. On 16 May 2018 he scored his first goal for the team in a 2−1 away loss against Anagennisi Karditsa. On 20 May 2018 he scored in a 5−1 home win against Aiginiakos, which cemented his team's place above the relegation zone. His performances with the club made Ergotelis officials request an extension to his loan from AEK, therefore securing Tselios' services until the end of the 2018−19 season.

=== Ergotelis ===
Having proven himself to be an invaluable asset for Ergotelis' style of play, the club's administration pushed for his acquisition via transfer from AEK. Their perseverance eventually paid off, as Tselios was released from his contract with AEK, and joined Ergotelis on a two-year deal in September 2019.

== Personal life ==
His twin brother, Themistoklis, is also a professional footballer.

== Career statistics ==
As of matches played 19 May 2021

Club	Season	League			Cup		Other		Total	
Club	Season	Division	Apps	Goals	Apps	Goals	Apps	Goals	Apps	Goals
AEK Athens	2013–14	Gamma Ethniki	1	0	—		0 (Note: Gamma Ethniki Cup)	0	1	0
AEK Athens	2015–16	Super League Greece	0	0	0	0	—		0	0
AEK Athens	2016–17	Super League Greece	2	0	2	0	—		4	0
AEK Athens	Total		3	0	2	0	0	0	5	0
Lamia	2017–18	Super League Greece	0	0	0	0	—		0	0
Lamia	Total		0	0	0	0	—		0	0
Ergotelis	2017–18	Football League	18	2	0	0	—		18	2
Ergotelis	2018–19	Football League	27	4	8	0	—		35	4
Ergotelis	2019–20	Super League 2	18	0	3	0	—		21	0
Ergotelis	2020–21	Super League 2	26	5	—		—		26	5
Total			89	11	11	0	—		100	11
Xanthi	2021–22	Super League 2	0	0	0	0	—		0	0
Xanthi	Total		0	0	0	0	—		0	0
Career total			92	11	13	0	0	0	105	11

== Honours ==
AEK Athens

- Football League 2: 2013–14
