= Nektarios Azizi =

Greek footballer (born 2000)

Personal information
- Date of birth: 4 November 2000 (age 25)
- Place of birth: Heraklion, Crete, Greece
- Height: 1.80 m (5 ft 11 in)
- Position: Forward

Youth career
- 2008–2016: Ergotelis
- 2016–2018: PAOK
- 2018–2019: OFI
- 2019–: Ergotelis

Senior career*
Years	Team	Apps	(Gls)
2019–	Ergotelis	1	(0)
2020–	→ Almyros Gazi (loan)	13	(7)
- * Club domestic league appearances and goals as of 6 June 2021

Nektarios Azizi (Greek: Νεκτάριος Αζίζι; born 4 November 2000) is a Greek professional footballer who plays as a forward.

== Career ==
=== Youth career ===
Born in Heraklion, Azizi began playing football at the infrastructure segments of local club Ergotelis. His performances drew the attention of many major clubs in Greece and eventually, Super League powerhouse PAOK arranged for his transfer to the PAOK Academy in the summer of 2016, where Azizi played for the club's U15 and U17 squads over a two-year period. In 2018, Azizi returned to Crete joining Super League side OFI's U19 squad. In the summer of 2019, Azizi returned to Ergotelis, where he signed his first professional contract in August.

=== Club career ===
Azizi began his professional career playing for both the Ergotelis U19 squad as well as the first team. He made his debut for the seniors on 6 December 2019, coming in as a second-half substitute for Antonis Bourselis in the 73rd minute in the Super League 2 match-up against Levadiakos.

== Career statistics ==
As of matches played 6 June 2021

Club	Season	League			Cup		Other		Total	
Club	Season	Division	Apps	Goals	Apps	Goals	Apps	Goals	Apps	Goals
Ergotelis	2019–20	Super League 2	1	0	0	0	—		1	0
Total			1	0	0	0	—		1	0
Almyros Gazi (loan)	2020–21	Gamma Ethniki	13	7	—		—		13	7
Total			13	7	—		—		13	7
Ergotelis	2021–22	Super League 2	0	0	0	0	—		0	0
Total			0	0	0	0	—		0	0
Career total			14	7	0	0	0	0	14	7
