= Giannis Iatroudis =

Greek footballer (born 1999)

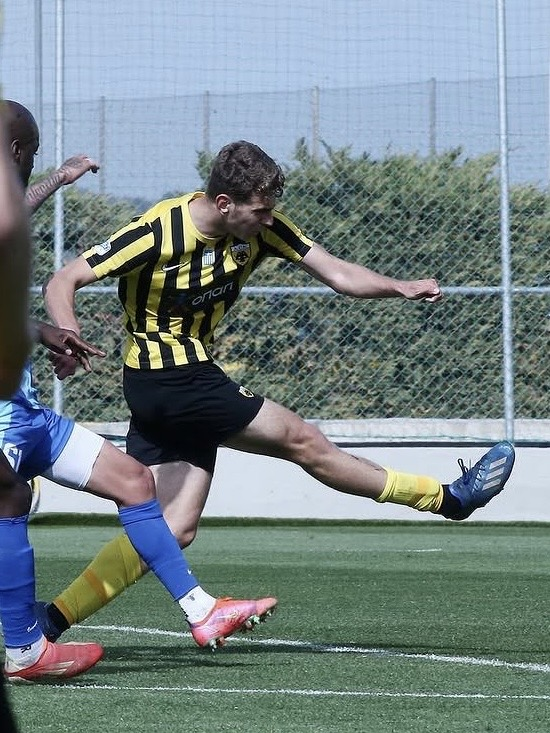

Personal information
- Full name: Ioannis Iatroudis
- Date of birth: 2 February 1999 (age 27)
- Place of birth: Heraklion, Crete, Greece
- Height: 1.93 m (6 ft 4 in)
- Positions: Forward; attacking midfielder

Team information
- Current team: Panachaiki
- Number: 16

Youth career
- 2005–2017: Ergotelis

Senior career*
Years	Team	Apps	(Gls)
2017–2020	Ergotelis	51	(5)
2020–2022	AEK Athens	0	(0)
2020–2021	→ Volendam (loan)	19	(1)
2021–2022	AEK Athens B	23	(1)
2022–2023	A.E. Kifisia	6	(0)
2023	Chania	10	(1)

International career^{‡}
2019	Greece U21	4	(1)
- * Club domestic league appearances and goals as of 16 June 2023 ‡ National team caps and goals as of 21:34, 14 October 2019 (UTC).

Giannis Iatroudis (Greek: Γιάννης Ιατρούδης; born 2 February 1999) is a Greek professional footballer who plays as a winger or a second striker for Super League 2 club Panachaiki.

== Career ==
=== Ergotelis ===
Iatroudis came through the youth system of Ergotelis, and made his senior debut against Panserraikos on the first matchday of the 2017–18 Greek Football Cup. He managed to impress during his first season with the club in the 2017–18 Greek Football League tournament, with 3 goals in 22 appearances, mostly as a substitute.

Iatroudis maintained his good form during the next season, scoring twice during the first match of the club's new season against Ermis Amyntaio in the 2018–19 Greek Cup. He added a third goal to his tally in the competition on the second matchday of the group stage, equalizing for his side during a tough 1–2 home loss against title holders, PAOK. He was instrumental in Ergotelis' impressive campaign to the Cup quarter-finals (their first since 1986), scoring against all Super League opponents faced by the club before being overpowered by Asteras Tripolis 5–1 on aggregate (Iatroudis having scored the single Ergotelis goal). He eventually finished as competition top-scorer. His performances were rewarded with his first call-up for the Greek national under-21 team.

=== AEK Athens ===
On 7 August 2020, after 15 years with Ergotelis, Iatroudis joined Super League giants AEK Athens on a four-year contract.

==== Loan to Volendam ====
On 2 October 2020, Iatroudis signed a long season contract with Volendam, on loan from AEK Athens.

== Career statistics ==
As of matches played 4 November 2019

Club	Season	League			Cup		Continental		Other		Total	
Club	Season	Division	Apps	Goals	Apps	Goals	Apps	Goals	Apps	Goals	Apps	Goals
Ergotelis	2017–18	Football League	22	3	3	0	—		—		25	3
Ergotelis	2018–19	Football League	26	2	8	6	—		—		34	8
Ergotelis	2019–20	Super League 2	3	0	2	1	—		—		5	1
Ergotelis	Total		51	5	13	7	—		—		64	12
Volendam	2020–21	Eerste Divisie	19	1	1	0	—		—		20	1
Career total			70	6	14	7	—		—		74	13

== Honours ==
=== Individual ===
- Football League Best Young Player Award: 2018−19
- Greek Cup Top goalscorer: 2018–19
