= Joseph Efford =

American soccer player (born 1996)

Joe Efford
Personal information
- Full name: Joseph Isiah Efford
- Date of birth: August 29, 1996 (age 30)
- Place of birth: Gwinnett County, Georgia, United States
- Height: 5 ft 9 in (1.75 m)
- Position: Winger

Youth career
- 2013−2014: Dacula Falcons

Senior career*
Years	Team	Apps	(Gls)
2014	Botoșani	0	(0)
2014–2016	Mallorca	1	(0)
2017–2020	Ergotelis	70	(29)
2020–2022	Waasland-Beveren	42	(4)
2022–2023	Motherwell	25	(2)
2023–2024	PAS Giannina	6	(0)
- * Club domestic league appearances and goals as of February 3, 2024

Joseph Isiah Efford (born August 29, 1996) is an American professional soccer player who plays as a winger.

== Career ==
=== Early career ===
Efford graduated from Dacula High School in 2014. After he finished freshman orientation at the University of North Carolina at Greensboro, he passed up a college soccer scholarship and opted for a professional career in Europe.

=== Botoșani ===
Efford went through several trials in Romania, before landing a contract with Liga I side FC Botoșani in June 2014. His contract, however, was terminated in July 2014.

=== Mallorca ===
Efford left Romania to undergo a new series of tryouts in Spain, eventually ending up training with Segunda División side RCD Mallorca. After convincing Los Bermellones of his worth during two-week trial, he signed a contract with the club in September 2014. However, problems with his visa kept him effectively out of the team for seven months before he was eventually cleared to play. In his two seasons with the club, he only managed to appear in one match.

=== Ergotelis ===
In September 2017, Efford went on trial with Greek Football League side Ergotelis and earned a contract. He received the no. 9 jersey and scored on his debut on October 25, 2017, in a 4–2 home loss to Super League club Xanthi in the Greek Cup. On March 5, 2018, in his twelfth league appearance for the club, Efford scored his first two goals in a 3−0 away win against AO Chania−Kissamikos. He also provided the assist for teammate Hugo Cuypers' goal in the 13th minute. Efford followed this with an early goal against Panachaiki on March 8. He scored a second brace on April 1, 2018, in a 5−1 victory over Panegialios.

Efford quickly became the focal point of Ergotelis' attack in the 2018–19 season, finishing as top-scorer for the club with 11 goals. During the following season, Efford scored his first professional hat trick on January 13, 2020, and moved up to second place on Ergotelis's list of all-time top scorers in professional competitions with 31 goals.

=== Waasland-Beveren ===
When Efford's contract with Ergotelis expired in the summer of 2020, he was heavily linked with Greek giants Panathinaikos, but instead he signed a three-year contract with Belgian First Division side Waasland-Beveren on July 20, 2020.

=== Motherwell ===
On January 29, 2022, Motherwell announced the signing of Efford for an undisclosed fee from Waasland-Beveren on a contract until the summer of 2023. On 11 September 2023, he left Motherwell after his contract was terminated by mutual agreement.

=== PAS Giannina ===
On September 16, 2023, he signed a three-year contract with PAS Giannina., He was released on January 30, 2024.

== Career statistics ==
As of matches played January 29, 2021

Appearances and goals by club, season and competition
Club	Season	League			Cup		Continental		Other		Total	
Club	Season	Division	Apps	Goals	Apps	Goals	Apps	Goals	Apps	Goals	Apps	Goals
Mallorca	2014–15	Segunda División	1	0	0	0	—		—		1	0
Mallorca	2015–16	Segunda División	0	0	0	0	—		—		0	0
Mallorca	Total		1	0	0	0	—		—		1	0
Ergotelis	2017–18	Football League	24	7	2	1	—		—		26	8
Ergotelis	2018–19	Football League	27	11	8	2	—		—		35	13
Ergotelis	2019–20	Super League 2	19	11	2	0	—		—		21	11
Ergotelis	Total		70	29	12	3	—		—		82	32
Waasland-Beveren	2020–21	Belgian First Division A	19	2	0	0	—		—		19	2
Career total			90	32	12	3	—		—		102	34
