= Manolis Rovithis =

Greek footballer

Personal information
- Full name: Emmanouil Rovithis
- Date of birth: 16 September 1992 (age 34)
- Place of birth: Heraklion, Crete, Greece
- Height: 1.81 m (5 ft 11 1/2 in)
- Position: Left winger

Team information
- Current team: Atsalenios

Youth career
- 2009–2010: Vyzas Megara

Senior career*
Years	Team	Apps	(Gls)
2010–2012	Vyzas Megara	32	(3)
2012–2015	OFI	32	(1)
2015–2016	AEL	18	(3)
2016–2017	OFI	1	(0)
2017	Sparti	13	(0)
2017−2020	Ergotelis	47	(15)
2020−2021	Alki Oroklini	0	(0)
2021	Anagennisi Karditsas	2	(0)
2022	Levadiakos	4	(0)
2022−2024	Giouchtas		
2024−2026	Atsalenios		
2026	Neapoli		
2026−	Atsalenios		
- * Club domestic league appearances and goals as of 16 April 2022

Manolis Rovithis (Greek: Μανώλης Ροβίθης; born 16 September 1992) is a Greek professional footballer who plays as a left winger for Atsalenios.

== Career ==
Rovithis started his career from the youth team of Vyzas Megara in 2009. A year later he signed a professional contract with the club and moved to the first squad, where he played 33 league games in the Football League and Gamma Ethniki (3rd National Category). On 27 August 2012 he moved to Super League club OFI. He competed with the Cretan club in the Greek Super League for almost 3 years. On 12 July 2015 he freed himself from his contract, after the dissolution of the team due to major financial problems, and after 10 days, on 23 July 2015, he moved to AEL and signed for 3 years. After a year's stay, on 9 August 2016, he left the club on mutual consent to return to OFI. His second stay was abruptly ended early in 2017 however, as he was not part of coach Nioplias' plans. Rovithis then had a brief stint with Football League side Sparti until the end of the 2016−17 season, before returning to Crete in September 2017 to play for fellow Football League side Ergotelis. His season with the Cretans abruptly came to an end due to suffering ACL rupture injuries twice during the season. As a token of their support, Ergotelis renewed Rovithis' contract for another year during his recovery period. He managed a full recovery from his injuries, and repaid his club's support with his most productive season yet, scoring six goals in 17 league matches, mostly coming in as a substitute.

== Career statistics ==
As of matches played 9 March 2020

Club	Season	League			Cup		Other		Total	
Club	Season	Division	Apps	Goals	Apps	Goals	Apps	Goals	Apps	Goals
Vyzas Megara	2010–11	Gamma Ethniki	6	1	—		—		6	1
Vyzas Megara	2011–12	Football League	26	2	1	0	—		27	2
Vyzas Megara	Total		32	3	1	0	—		33	3
OFI	2012–13	Super League Greece	4	0	1	0	—		5	0
OFI	2013–14	Super League Greece	11	1	2	0	—		13	1
OFI	2014–15	Super League Greece	17	0	5	0	—		22	0
OFI	Total		32	1	8	0	—		40	1
AEL	2015–16	Football League	18	3	4	0	—		22	3
AEL	Total		18	3	4	0	—		22	3
OFI	2016–17	Football League	1	0	2	0	—		3	0
OFI	Total		1	0	2	0	—		3	0
Sparti	2016–17	Football League	13	0	0	0	—		13	0
Sparti	Total		13	0	0	0	—		13	0
Ergotelis	2017–18	Football League	11	0	2	1	—		13	1
Ergotelis	2018–19	Football League	18	6	4	0	—		22	6
Ergotelis	2019–20	Super League 2	18	9	2	0	—		20	9
Ergotelis	Total		47	15	8	1	—		55	16
Career total			143	22	23	1	—		166	23

== Honours ==
Levadiakos

- Super League 2: 2021–22
