= Issahaku Yakubu =

Ghanaian footballer (born 1994)

Personal information
- Full name: Issahaku Yakubu
- Date of birth: 17 June 1994 (age 32)
- Place of birth: Ghana
- Height: 1.73 m (5 ft 8 in)
- Position: Left back

Team information
- Current team: Al Ahli Tripoli
- Number: 2

Youth career
- –2014: JMG Academy Accra
- 2014–2015: Lierse

Senior career*
Years	Team	Apps	(Gls)
2015–2018	Lierse	61	(0)
2018–2019	Ergotelis	11	(1)
2018-21	Wadi Degla	81	(2)
2021-2026	National Bank of Egypt SC	131	(3)
2026–	Al Ahli Tripoli	2	(0)
- * Club domestic league appearances and goals as of 14/2/26 @ 16:05PM(AEST)

Issahaku "Leftey" Yakubu (born 17 June 1994) is a Ghanaian professional footballer who plays as Left-back.

== Club career ==
Yakubu began his career at the JMG Academy in Ghana and moved to the youth squad of Belgian Pro League side Lierse in 2014. He was promoted to the senior squad in July 2015 and played for Lierse in the Belgian Second Division until May 2018, when the club went bankrupt.

In the summer of 2018, Yakubu signed a two-year contract with Greek Football League club Ergotelis. He scored his first goal ever in his fourth cap with the club, during a 2–1 Away win vs. fellow Cretan club AO Chania Kissamikos. His performances with Ergotelis impressed club owner Maged Samy, who arranged for Yakubu's transfer to his Egyptian Premier League side Wadi Degla in the winter of 2019.

== Career statistics ==
As of matches played 8 January 2019

Club	Season	League			Cup		Europe		Other		Total	
Club	Season	Division	Apps	Goals	Apps	Goals	Apps	Goals	Apps	Goals	Apps	Goals
Lierse	2014–15	Belgian Pro League	0	0	0	0	—		1 (Note: Jupiler Pro League Relegation Playoff)	0	1	0
Lierse	2015–16	Belgian Second Division	3	0	0	0	—		—		3	0
Lierse	2016–17	Belgian Second Division	25	0	1	0	—		8 (Note: Jupiler Pro League Playoff II)	0	34	0
Lierse	2017–18	Belgian Second Division	19	0	1	0	—		5	0	25	0
Total			47	0	2	0	—		14	0	63	0
Ergotelis	2018–19	Football League	11	1	5	0	—		—		16	1
Total			11	1	5	0	—		—		16	1
Wadi Degla	2018–19	Premier League	7	1	0	0	—		—		7	1
Total			7	1	0	0	—		—		7	1
Career total			65	2	7	0	—		14	0	76	2
