= Nikos Psimopoulos =

Greek footballer

Personal information
- Full name: Nikolaos Psimopoulos
- Date of birth: 19 June 2003 (age 23)
- Place of birth: Heraklion, Crete, Greece
- Height: 1.83 m (6 ft 0 in)
- Position: Goalkeeper

Team information
- Current team: PANO Malia

Youth career
- –2019: Ergotelis

Senior career*
Years	Team	Apps	(Gls)
2019–2022	Ergotelis	1	(0)
2022–2023	Rodos		
2023–2024	Agios Nikolaos		
2025	Rodos		
2025	Irodotos		
2026–	PANO Malia		

International career^{‡}
2014–2015	Greece U17	1	(0)
- * Club domestic league appearances and goals as of 1 May 2022 ‡ National team caps and goals as of 19 November 2019

Nikos Psimopoulos (Greek: Νίκος Ψιμόπουλος; born 19 June 2003) is a Greek professional footballer who plays as a goalkeeper for PANO Malia.
