= Michalis Bousis =

Greek footballer (born 1999)

Personal information
- Full name: Michailakis Bousis
- Date of birth: 2 January 1999 (age 27)
- Place of birth: Athens, Greece
- Height: 1.82 m (6 ft 0 in)
- Position: Left-back

Team information
- Current team: AEL
- Number: 23

Youth career
- 2010–2013: Egaleo
- 2013–2018: AEK Athens

Senior career*
Years	Team	Apps	(Gls)
2018–2022	AEK Athens	0	(0)
2019–2020	→ Ergotelis (loan)	12	(1)
2020–2021	→ Apollon Larissa (loan)	4	(0)
2021–2022	AEK Athens B	17	(0)
2022–2023	Egaleo	24	(0)
2023–2024	Kampaniakos	31	(1)
2024–2025	Panionios	24	(3)
2025–2026	Anagennisi Karditsa	21	(2)
2026–	AEL	4	(1)

International career^{‡}
2016	Greece U17	4	(0)
2017	Greece U18	6	(0)
2017–2018	Greece U19	10	(0)
- * Club domestic league appearances and goals as of 15 October 2026 ‡ National team caps and goals as of 27 March 2018

Michalis Bousis (Greek: Μιχάλης Μπούσης; born 2 January 1999) is a Greek professional footballer who plays as a left-back for Super League 2 club AEL.

== Career ==
=== AEK Athens ===
Bousis comes from AEK Athens' youth ranks.

On 25 August 2019, he was loaned to Ergotelis.

On 6 October 2020, he joined Apollon Larissa on a season-long loan.

== Career statistics ==
As of match played 15 October 2026

Club	Season	League			National cup		Continental		Other		Total	
Club	Season	Division	Apps	Goals	Apps	Goals	Apps	Goals	Apps	Goals	Apps	Goals
Ergotelis (loan)	2019–20	Superleague Greece 2	12	1	2	0	—		—		14	1
Apollon Larissa (loan)	2020–21	Superleague Greece 2	4	0	0	0	—		—		4	0
AEK Athens B	2021–22	Superleague Greece 2	17	0	—		—		—		17	0
Egaleo	2022–23	Superleague Greece 2	24	0	1	0	—		—		25	0
Kampaniakos	2023–24	Superleague Greece 2	31	1	1	0	—		—		32	1
Panionios	2024–25	Superleague Greece 2	24	3	4	0	—		—		28	3
Anagennisi Karditsa	2025–26	Superleague Greece 2	21	2	1	0	—		—		22	2
AEL	2026–27	Superleague Greece 2	4	1	3	0	—		—		7	1
Career total			137	8	12	0	0	0	0	0	149	8
