= Giannis Kiliaras =

Greek footballer (born 1988)

Personal information
- Full name: Ioannis Rafail Kiliaras
- Date of birth: 9 June 1988 (age 38)
- Place of birth: Nea Alikarnassos, Crete, Greece
- Height: 1.75 m (5 ft 9 in)
- Position: Left-back

Team information
- Current team: Irodotos

Youth career
- Irodotos
- –2007: Ergotelis
- 2006–2007: → PANOM (loan)

Senior career*
Years	Team	Apps	(Gls)
2007–2010	Ergotelis	11	(1)
2010	→ Trikala (loan)	15	(1)
2010–2013	Panachaiki	82	(2)
2013–2014	Ergotelis	5	(0)
2014–2015	Irodotos	12	(2)
2015–2019	OFI	66	(2)
2019–2020	Ergotelis	13	(0)
2020–2021	Irodotos		
2022–2024	Almyros Gazi		
2024–	Irodotos		
- * Club domestic league appearances and goals as of 3 July 2020

Giannis Kiliaras (Greek: Γιάννης Κοιλιάρας; born 9 June 1988) is a Greek professional footballer who plays as a left back for Irodotos.

== Club career ==
Born in Nea Alikarnassos, Kiliaras began playing football for local Cretan side Irodotos, with whom he made his senior debut in the Delta Ethniki, before making a leap in his career and signing with Super League side Ergotelis. Following a one-year loan to fellow Cretan Delta Ethniki side PANOM, Kiliaras signed his first professional contract with the club in the summer of 2007. After a brief loan spell to Gamma Ethniki side Trikala in the winter of 2010, Kiliaras left Ergotelis in the summer of 2010 having made a total of 11 appearances and having scored 1 goal. In August, he signed a contract with Patras-based club Panachaiki. with whom he played in both the Third and Second Division.

He returned to Ergotelis and the Super League in 2013, but left in September 2014, after a falling out with the club's board of directors following a loan deal refusal. After releasing himself from his contract, Kiliaras rejoined his childhood club Irodotos in the Gamma Ethniki. After one season with Irodotos, Kiliaras signed with Cretan former renowned club OFI, who had been relegated to the Gamma Ethniki following its withdrawal from professional competitions. In the years following, Kiliaras was named among the team's captains, won promotion to the Football League and eventually helped reclaim the team's spot in the Super League, winning the Second Division title in 2018. Being one of the last players in OFI's Super League roster still remaining from the club's years in the third Division, Kiliaras received substantially less playing time in top-flight, and was eventually released from his contract in the winter of 2019. Having been in talks with Ergotelis' new administration, Kiliaras rejoined the club on the same day after his release from OFI, thus starting his third tenure with the Cretan club.

In July 2020, Kiliaras returned to his former club, Irodotos. In January 2022, he moved to Almyros Gaziou. Ahead of the 2024–25 season, Kiliaras once again returned to Irodotos.

== Personal life ==
Born in Heraklion, Kiliaras began playing football at a young age, when his father, a retired Irodotos footballer, signed him up at the infrastructure segments of his former club. His older brother Dimitris is also a professional footballer. They played together for Ergotelis in the Super League during the 2007–08 season.

== Honours ==
=== Panachaiki ===
- Football League 2: 2010–11

=== OFI ===
- Gamma Ethniki: 2015–16
- Football League: 2017–18
