= Albert Bruce =

Ghanaian professional footballer

Personal information
- Date of birth: 30 December 1993 (age 32)
- Place of birth: Accra, Ghana
- Height: 1.82 m (5 ft 11 1/2 in)
- Position: Midfielder

Team information
- Current team: Al-Mosul

Youth career
- –2009: Power
- 2009–2010: Berekum Arsenal

Senior career*
Years	Team	Apps	(Gls)
2010–2014	Asante Kotoko	0	(0)
2012	→ Legia Warsaw (loan)	0	(0)
2014–2015	Qormi	14	(0)
2015	Naxxar Lions	14	(0)
2015–2016	Valletta	9	(0)
2016	Sliema Wanderers	0	(0)
2017–2018	Panegialios	19	(0)
2018–2020	Ergotelis	44	(1)
2020–2021	Panachaiki	20	(1)
2021–2022	Ermis Aradippou	22	(0)
2022–2023	PAEEK	19	(3)
2023–2024	Giouchtas	28	(4)
2024–	Al-Mosul		

International career
	Ghana U17	2	(0)
2011	Ghana U20	3	(0)
- * Club domestic league appearances and goals as of 30 December 2024

Albert Bruce (born 30 December 1993) is a Ghanaian professional footballer who plays as a midfielder for Iraqi Premier Division League club Al-Mosul.

== Career ==
Bruce started his career with Power FC in Koforidua. He then moved to Berekum Arsenal before joining Asante Kotoko in July 2010. During his spell with the Porcupines, Bruce was loaned out to Polish club Legia Warsaw in a three-year deal, but was unable to command a starting place in the team, which resulted in his loan deal being terminated in December 2012.

Bruce continued to pursue a career abroad, undergoing trials with Maltese side Qormi before being offered a deal, earning Asante Kotoko a reported transfer fee of 50K Euros. He then moved to fellow Maltese club Naxxar Lions in January 2015, before signing a two-year contract with Maltese giants Valletta in the summer of 2015.

After spending several months sidelined due to injury, Bruce eventually signed a contract with Greek 2nd Division club Panegialios in February 2017. A year later, he released himself from his contract with the club and subsequently joined fellow Greek 2nd-tier club Ergotelis on a 1,5-year deal. His stellar performances with the club during the first half of the 2018–19 season reportedly drew interest from Greek reigning champions AEK.

In August 2020, Bruce was transferred from Ergotelis to fellow Super League 2 side Panachaiki for an undisclosed transfer fee.

== Career statistics ==
As of 18 May 2021.

Appearances and goals by club, season and competition
Club	Season	League			National cup (Note: Includes Greek Cup)		Continental		Other		Total	
Club	Season	Division	Apps	Goals	Apps	Goals	Apps	Goals	Apps	Goals	Apps	Goals
Legia Warsaw (loan)	2011–12	Ekstraklasa	0	0	0	0	0	0	—		0	0
Legia Warsaw (loan)	2012–13	Ekstraklasa	0	0	0	0	0	0	0	0	0	0
Legia Warsaw (loan)	Total		0	0	0	0	0	0	0	0	0	0
Qormi	2014–15	Maltese Premier League	14	0	0	0	—		0	0	14	0
Naxxar Lions	2014–15	Maltese Premier League	14	0	0	0	—		0	0	14	0
Valletta	2015–16	Maltese Premier League	9	0	0	0	0	0	0	0	9	0
Sliema Wanderers	2015–16	Maltese Premier League	0	0	0	0	—		0	0	0	0
Panegialios	2016–17	Football League	9	0	0	0	—		0	0	9	0
Panegialios	2017–18	Football League	10	0	3	0	—		0	0	13	0
Panegialios	Total		19	0	3	0	0	0	0	0	22	0
Ergotelis	2017–18	Football League	2	0	0	0	—		0	0	2	0
Ergotelis	2018–19	Football League	28	1	8	0	—		0	0	36	1
Ergotelis	2019–20	Super League 2	14	0	3	0	—		0	0	17	0
Ergotelis	Total		44	1	11	0	0	0	0	0	55	1
Panachaiki	2020–21	Super League 2	20	1	0	0	—		0	0	20	1
Career total			120	2	14	0	0	0	0	0	134	2
