= Stergios Psianos =

Greek footballer

Personal information
- Full name: Stergios Psianos
- Date of birth: 12 September 1989 (age 37)
- Place of birth: Kozani, Greece
- Height: 1.76 m (5 ft 9 in)
- Position: Midfielder

Team information
- Current team: Kozani

Senior career*
Years	Team	Apps	(Gls)
2007–2009	Apollon Kalamarias	32	(2)
2009–2011	Ethnikos Piraeus	52	(3)
2011–2012	Thrasyvoulos	31	(0)
2012–2013	Niki Volos	43	(1)
2013–2014	Nea Salamina	35	(1)
2014–2015	Ayia Napa	15	(0)
2015–2016	Apollon Smyrnis	41	(0)
2016–2017	Acharnaikos	8	(1)
2017	Kissamikos	10	(0)
2017–2018	Asteras Vlachioti	0	(0)
2018–2020	Karaiskakis	60	(7)
2020–2021	Onisilos Sotira	0	(0)
2021–2022	Kozani	19	(3)

International career^{‡}
2007–2008	Greece U19	8	(0)
- * Club domestic league appearances and goals as of 9 February 2020 ‡ National team caps and goals as of May 2008

Stergios Psianos (Greek: Στέργιος Ψιάνος, born 12 September 1989) is a Greek professional footballer who plays as a midfielder for Kozani.

== Career ==
Psianos signed a contract with Cypriot club Nea Salamina on July 4, 2013 and made his debut on September 1, 2013, at the 2–0 away loss against Doxa Katokopias.
