= Arthur Bote =

Brazilian footballer (born 1997)

Personal information
- Full name: Arthur César Reis Castro
- Date of birth: 7 January 1997 (age 29)
- Height: 1.72 m (5 ft 8 in)
- Position: Left-back

Team information
- Current team: Flacăra Horezu
- Number: 16

Youth career
- –2018: Santos

Senior career*
Years	Team	Apps	(Gls)
2018–2019	Sintrense	5	(0)
2019	Sertanense	3	(0)
2019–2022	Ergotelis	17	(0)
2022	Flacăra Horezu	13	(4)
2022–	Agios Nikolaos	0	(0)
- * Club domestic league appearances and goals as of 08:10, 21 June 2022 (UTC)

Arthur César Reis Castro (born 7 January 1997), commonly known as Arthur Bote, is a Brazilian professional footballer who plays as a defender.

== Career statistics ==
=== Club ===
As of 11 April 2021.

Club	Season	League			National Cup		League Cup		Other		Total	
Club	Season	Division	Apps	Goals	Apps	Goals	Apps	Goals	Apps	Goals	Apps	Goals
Sintrense	2018–19	Campeonato de Portugal	5	0	0	0	0	0	0	0	5	0
Sertanense	2018–19	Campeonato de Portugal	3	0	0	0	0	0	0	0	3	0
Ergotelis	2019–20	Super League Greece 2	10	0	1 (Note: Appearances in the Greek Cup)	0	–		–		11	0
Ergotelis	2020–21	Super League Greece 2	7	0	0	0	–		–		7	0
Career total			25	0	1	0	0	0	0	0	26	0
