= Barata (footballer, born 1996) =

Portuguese footballer (born 1996)

Personal information
- Full name: Vítor Hugo Encarnação Freitas
- Date of birth: 3 March 1996 (age 30)
- Place of birth: Funchal, Portugal
- Height: 1.76 m (5 ft 9 in)
- Position: Attacking midfielder

Team information
- Current team: Persiku Kudus
- Number: 7

Youth career
- 2009–2011: Marítimo
- 2011–2013: Sporting CP
- 2013–2014: Marítimo

Senior career*
Years	Team	Apps	(Gls)
2014–2019	Marítimo B	18	(5)
2019–2020	Ergotelis	17	(2)
2020–2022	Ierapetra	19	(2)
2021–2022	Tríkala	1	(0)
2022	Stal Stalowa Wola	9	(0)
2022	Ágios Nikólaos	0	(0)
2022–2023	Nejmeh	9	(0)
2024	Nejmeh	6	(0)
2024–2025	Persibo Bojonegoro	17	(4)
2025–2026	PSMS Medan	11	(3)
2026	Gokulam Kerala	4	(0)
2026–	Persiku Kudus	0	(0)
- * Club domestic league appearances and goals as of 12 May 2026

Vítor Hugo Encarnação Freitas (born 3 March 1996), commonly known as Vítor Barata or just Barata, is a Portuguese professional footballer who plays as an attacking midfielder for Championship club Persiku Kudus.

== Career ==
Early in his football career, Barata underwent trials with Portuguese giants Benfica and Sporting CP, with whom he signed in August 2011 at the age of 14. He spent two years with the club, playing at youth level. On 5 November 2014, Barata made his professional debut with Marítimo B in a 2014–15 Segunda Liga match against União Madeira.

In July 2019, Barata signed a two-year contract with Greek Super League 2 side Ergotelis.

On 5 February 2022, Barata joined Polish III liga club Stal Stalowa Wola. He made his debut in a friendly against Polonia Bytom and scored one goal.

On 6 July 2022, he returned to Greece to join Ágios Nikólaos.

== Honours ==
Nejmeh

- Lebanese Premier League: 2023–24
