= José Rodríguez (footballer, born 1985) =

Spanish footballer

Personal information
- Full name: José Antonio Rodríguez Munera
- Date of birth: 1 July 1985 (age 41)
- Place of birth: Palma de Mallorca, Spain
- Height: 1.80 m (5 ft 11 in)
- Position: Centre back

Youth career
- Mallorca

Senior career*
Years	Team	Apps	(Gls)
2004–2007	Mallorca B	83	(7)
2006–2007	→ Torrevieja (loan)	15	(0)
2007–2008	Ferriolense	16	(1)
2008–2009	Ibiza-Eivissa	31	(1)
2009–2010	Guijuelo	31	(1)
2010	Ejido	12	(0)
2010–2011	Eibar	3	(0)
2011–2012	Burgos	26	(0)
2012–2013	Salamanca	24	(0)
2013–2014	Arroyo	20	(0)
2014–2015	Hospitalet	13	(0)
2015–2016	Socuéllamos	27	(0)
2016–2017	Extremadura	30	(1)
2017–2018	Maccabi Herzliya	25	(1)
2019	Karaiskakis	15	(0)
2019–2020	Villarrobledo	14	(1)
2020–2022	Inter Club d'Escaldes	14	(0)
2022	Salamanca	12	(0)
- * Club domestic league appearances and goals

José Antonio Rodríguez Munera (born 1 July 1985) is a Spanish former professional footballer who played as a centre back.

== Club career ==
Born in Palma de Mallorca, Rodríguez graduated from the youth academy of RCD Mallorca and made his senior debut with the reserves in 2004. On 20 October 2005, he made his first team debut in a 4–1 defeat against CD Alcoyano in the season's Copa del Rey.

After a stint with CD Ferriolense in the fourth tier, Rodríguez represented UD Ibiza-Eivissa, CD Guijuelo Polideportivo Ejido, SD Eibar, Burgos CF, UD Salamanca, Arroyo CP, CE L'Hospitalet, UD Socuéllamos and Extremadura UD – all in Segunda División B.

On 16 November 2017, Rodríguez moved abroad and joined Israeli club Maccabi Herzliya. On 2 January 2019, he switched to Greek club Karaiskakis.

== Club statistics ==
As of match played on 24 May 2019

Club	Season	League			Cup		Other		Total	
Club	Season	Division	Apps	Goals	Apps	Goals	Apps	Goals	Apps	Goals
Mallorca	2005–06	La Liga	0	0	1	0	—		1	0
Ibiza-Eivissa	2007–08	Segunda División B	6	0	0	0	—		6	0
Ibiza-Eivissa	2008–09	Segunda División B	25	0	0	0	—		25	0
Ibiza-Eivissa	Total		31	0	0	0	—		31	0
Guijuelo	2009–10	Segunda División B	31	1	0	0	2 (Note: Appearances in Relegation Play-offs)	0	33	1
Ejido	2010–11	Segunda División B	12	0	4	0	—		16	0
Eibar	2010–11	Segunda División B	3	0	0	0	—		3	0
Eibar	2011–12	Segunda División B	26	0	1	0	—		27	0
Salamanca	2012–13	Segunda División B	24	0	0	0	—		24	0
Arroyo	2013–14	Segunda División B	20	0	0	0	—		20	0
Hospitalet	2014–15	Segunda División B	13	0	1	0	—		14	0
Socuéllamos	2015–16	Segunda División B	27	0	1	0	2 (Note: Appearances in Promotion Play-offs)	0	30	0
Extremadura	2016–17	Segunda División B	30	1	2	0	—		32	1
Maccabi Herzliya	2017–18	Liga Leumit	25	1	0	0	—		25	1
Karaiskakis	2018–19	Football League	15	0	0	0	—		15	0
Career total			257	3	10	0	4	0	271	3
