= Ramez Medhat =

Egyptian footballer (born 1999)

Personal information
- Full name: Wassef Ramez Medhat
- Date of birth: 10 August 1999 (age 27)
- Height: 1.74 m (5 ft 9 in)
- Position: Forward

Team information
- Current team: Pharco
- Number: 77

Youth career
- ENPPI
- Al Ahly
- Zamalek
- –2016: Al Mokawloon
- 2016–2018: Al Ahly
- 2018–2019: Pyramids
- 2019–2020: Wadi Degla

Senior career*
Years	Team	Apps	(Gls)
2020–2023	Wadi Degla	4	(0)
2020	→ Ergotelis (loan)	4	(0)
2021–2022	→ Tala'ea El Gaish (loan)	4	(0)
2025	Egri	8	(1)
2025–	Pharco	8	(1)
- * Club domestic league appearances and goals as of 23:14, 2 March 2026 (UTC)

Wassef Ramez Medhat (born 10 August 1999) is an Egyptian professional footballer who plays as a forward for Pharco.

== Career ==
Having progressed through the academies of various Egyptian clubs, including Al Ahly and Pyramids, Medhat settled at Wadi Degla. He was loaned to Greek Super League 2 club Ergotelis in January 2020. After four league appearances for Ergotelis, he returned to Egypt and made six appearances in all competitions for Wadi Degla, before being loaned to fellow Egyptian Premier League club Tala'ea El Gaish in September 2021.

Following his release by Wadi Degla in 2023, Medhat eventually moved to Hungary, signing with third tier club Egri in early 2025. He returned to Egypt in mid-2025, joining Pharco, and scored his first goal in the Egyptian Premier League on 17 September 2025 in Pharco's 1–1 draw with Al Mokawloon.

== Personal life ==
As well as Egypt, Medhat is also a citizen of Hungary.

== Career statistics ==
=== Club ===
As of 2 March 2026.

Appearances and goals by club, season and competition
Club	Season	League			National Cup (Note: Includes Egyptian Cup, Greek Cup and Hungarian Cup)		League Cup (Note: Includes Egyptian League Cup)		Other		Total	
Club	Season	Division	Apps	Goals	Apps	Goals	Apps	Goals	Apps	Goals	Apps	Goals
Wadi Degla	2019–20	Egyptian Premier League	0	0	0	0	0	0	0	0	0	0
Wadi Degla	2020–21	Egyptian Premier League	4	0	2	0	0	0	0	0	6	0
Wadi Degla	2021–22	Egyptian Premier League	0	0	0	0	0	0	0	0	0	0
Wadi Degla	2022–23	Egyptian Premier League	0	0	0	0	0	0	0	0	0	0
Wadi Degla	Total		4	0	2	0	0	0	0	0	6	0
Ergotelis (loan)	2019–20	Super League Greece 2	4	0	0	0	–		0	0	4	0
Tala'ea El Gaish (loan)	2021–22	Egyptian Premier League	4	0	0	0	0	0	0	0	4	0
Egri	2024–25	NB III	8	1	0	0	–		0	0	8	1
Pharco	2025–26	Egyptian Premier League	8	1	0	0	3	0	0	0	11	1
Career total			4	0	0	0	0	0	0	0	4	0
