= Georgios Kakko =

Greek footballer

Personal information
- Full name: Georgios Kakko
- Date of birth: 18 May 1997 (age 29)
- Place of birth: Elbasan, Albania
- Height: 1.72 m (5 ft 7 1/2 in)
- Position: Winger

Youth career
- 2008–2016: PAOK

Senior career*
Years	Team	Apps	(Gls)
2016–2019	PAOK	1	(0)
2016–2017	→ Panserraikos (loan)	26	(5)
2017	→ Nea Salamina (loan)	8	(0)
2018	→ Panserraikos (loan)	16	(2)
2018–2019	→ Karaiskakis (loan)	22	(2)
2019–2020	Aspropyrgos	21	(5)
2020–2021	Levadiakos	0	(0)
2021	Diagoras	15	(0)
2021–2022	Iraklis	23	(2)
2022	Agrotikos Asteras		
2023–2025	Poseidon Neas Michaniona		
2025–2026	Foinikas Polichni		

International career^{‡}
2015–2016	Greece U18	6	(1)
2016	Greece U19	2	(0)
- * Club domestic league appearances and goals as of 11 September 2024 ‡ National team caps and goals as of 2 February 2017

Georgios Kakko (Albanian: Gjergj Kako, born 18 May 1997) is a professional footballer who plays as a winger. Born in Albania, he has represented Greece at youth level.

== Career ==
On August 26, 2016, it was announced that Kakko signed a long year season contract with Panserraikos, on loan from PAOK. A year later, on 1 August 2017 it was announced that Kakko signed a long year season contract with Nea Salamina, on loan from PAOK.
