= Konstantinos Ikonomou =

Greek footballer

Personal information
- Date of birth: 16 March 1996 (age 30)
- Place of birth: Budapest, Hungary
- Height: 1.86 m (6 ft 1 in)
- Position: Centre-back

Youth career
- MTK Budapest

Senior career*
Years	Team	Apps	(Gls)
2015–2016	MTK Budapest II		
2016	Budafoki MTE		
2016–2017	SZEOL	37	(1)
2017	Szeged-Csanád	1	(0)
2018–2020	Ergotelis	26	(0)
2020–2022	Šamorín	49	(1)
2022–2024	Soroksár	12	(0)
2024–2025	Kozármisleny	7	(0)
2024–2025	→ Pécs (loan)		
2025–2026	Pécs		

International career
2012–2013	Greece U17	8	(0)
2014	Greece U18	4	(1)
2014	Greece U19	7	(0)
- * Club domestic league appearances and goals as of 25 May 2025

Konstantinos Ikonomou (Greek: Κωνσταντίνος Οικονόμου; born 16 March 1996) is a Greek professional footballer who plays as a centre-back.

== Club career ==
On 13 July 2022, Ikonomou signed with Soroksár in Hungary.
