= Patrick Bahanack =

Greek footballer

Personal information
- Date of birth: 3 August 1997 (age 29)
- Place of birth: Yaoundé, Cameroon
- Height: 1.85 m (6 ft 1 in)
- Position: Centre-back

Team information
- Current team: Punjab

Youth career
- –2017: Nkufo Academy Sports

Senior career*
Years	Team	Apps	(Gls)
2017–2019	Stade Reims B	26	(0)
2018–2019	Reims	0	(0)
2019	→ Ergotelis (loan)	14	(1)
2019–2021	Lamia	11	(0)
2021–2023	Levadiakos	40	(2)
2023–2024	Niki Volos	17	(0)
2024–2026	Ethnikos Achna	43	(0)
2026–	Punjab	0	(0)
- * Club domestic league appearances and goals as of 15:03, 27 August 2026 (UTC)

Patrick Bahanack (born 3 August 1997) is a Cameroonian professional footballer who plays as a centre-back for Indian Super League club Punjab.

== Career ==
=== Early career ===
Bahanack began his career at the N.K.U.F.O. Academy Sports, Yaoundé, Cameroon in 2017 before joining Stade Reims B Team, Reims, France in 2018. He was transferred to the main Reims squad in July 2018.

=== Lamia ===
Bahanack joined Lamia from Reims on a two-year deal in August 2019.

== Career statistics ==
As of 25 June 2025

Club	Season	League			Cup		Continental		Other		Total	
Club	Season	Division	Apps	Goals	Apps	Goals	Apps	Goals	Apps	Goals	Apps	Goals
Ergotelis (loan)	2018–19	Super League Greece 2	13	1	1	0	—		—		14	1
Lamia	2019–20	Super League Greece	2	0	4	0	—		—		6	0
Lamia	2020–21	Super League Greece	5	0	0	0	—		—		5	0
Lamia	Total		7	0	4	0	—		—		11	0
Levadiakos	2021–22	Super League Greece 2	21	2	1	0	—		—		22	2
Levadiakos	2022–23	Super League Greece	15	0	3	0	—		—		18	0
Levadiakos	Total		36	2	4	0	—		—		40	2
Niki Volos	2023–24	Super League Greece 2	14	0	3	0	—		—		17	0
Ethnikos Achna	2024–25	Cypriot First Division	30	0	1	0	—		—		31	0
Career total			100	3	13	0	0	0	0	0	113	3

== Honours ==
Levadiakos

- Super League 2: 2021–22
