= Antonis Stathopoulos =

Greek footballer

Personal information
- Full name: Antonios Stathopoulos
- Date of birth: 23 February 1998 (age 28)
- Place of birth: Filiatra, Greece
- Height: 1.85 m (6 ft 1 in)
- Position: Striker

Youth career
- –2013: Erani Filiatra
- 2013–2016: Twente
- 2016–2018: PAOK

Senior career*
| Years | Team | Apps | (Gls) |
| 2018–2020 | Ergotelis | 11 | (0) |
| 2020–2021 | Ialysos | 17 | (0) |
| 2021–2023 | Episkopi | 51 | (5) |
| 2023–2024 | Proodeftiki | | |

International career^{‡}
| 2013–2014 | Greece U16 | 3 | (7) |
| 2013–2014 | Greece U17 | 1 | (4) |
| 2015–2016 | Greece U19 | 16 | (2) |
- * Club domestic league appearances and goals as of 16 June 2023 ‡ National team caps and goals as of 12 November 2016

Antonis Stathopoulos (Greek: Αντώνης Σταθόπουλος; born 23 February 1998) is a Greek professional footballer who plays as a striker.
