= Konstantinos Chatzidimpas =

Greek footballer (born 1999)

Personal information
- Date of birth: 12 May 1999 (age 27)
- Place of birth: Thessaloniki, Greece
- Height: 1.83 m (6 ft 0 in)
- Position: Defensive midfielder

Youth career
- 2013–2015: PAOK

Senior career*
| Years | Team | Apps | (Gls) |
| 2015–2018 | PAOK | 0 | (0) |
| 2018–2019 | Ergotelis | 1 | (0) |
| 2019–2020 | Ialysos | 13 | (0) |
| 2020–2021 | Karaiskakis | 23 | (0) |
| 2021–2023 | Kallithea | 24 | (0) |
| 2023 | Proodeftiki | 7 | (0) |
| 2023–2024 | Egaleo | 2 | (0) |

International career^{‡}
| 2014–2015 | Greece U16 | 4 | (0) |
| 2015–2016 | Greece U17 | 16 | (1) |
| 2017 | Greece U18 | 6 | (1) |
| 2017–2018 | Greece U19 | 14 | (0) |
| 2018 | Greece U20 | 2 | (0) |
- * Club domestic league appearances and goals as of 16 June 2023 ‡ National team caps and goals as of 11 January 2018

Konstantinos Chatzidimpas (Greek: Κωνσταντίνος Χατζηδίμπας; born 12 May 1999) is a Greek former professional footballer who played as a defensive midfielder.
