= Dimitrios Voutsas =

Greek footballer

Personal information
- Full name: Dimitrios Voutsas
- Date of birth: 20 May 2000 (age 26)
- Place of birth: Thessaloniki, Greece
- Height: 1.73 m (5 ft 8 in)
- Position: Right-back

Team information
- Current team: Evosmos

Youth career
- 2009–2018: PAOK

Senior career*
Years	Team	Apps	(Gls)
2017–2018	PAOK	0	(0)
2018	→ Langadas (loan)		
2018–2020	Ergotelis	2	(0)
2020	→ Triglia (loan)	0	(0)
2020–	Evosmos	0	(0)

International career^{‡}
2016	Greece U16	4	(0)
2016–2017	Greece U17	8	(0)
- * Club domestic league appearances and goals as of 5 May 2019 ‡ National team caps and goals as of 23 February 2017

Dimitrios Voutsas (Greek: Δημήτριος Βουτσάς; born 20 May 2000) is a Greek professional footballer who plays as a right-back for Evosmos.
