= Nea Alikarnassos =

Suburb of Heraklion, Greece

Nea Alikarnassos Νέα Αλικαρνασσός
- Municipal unit
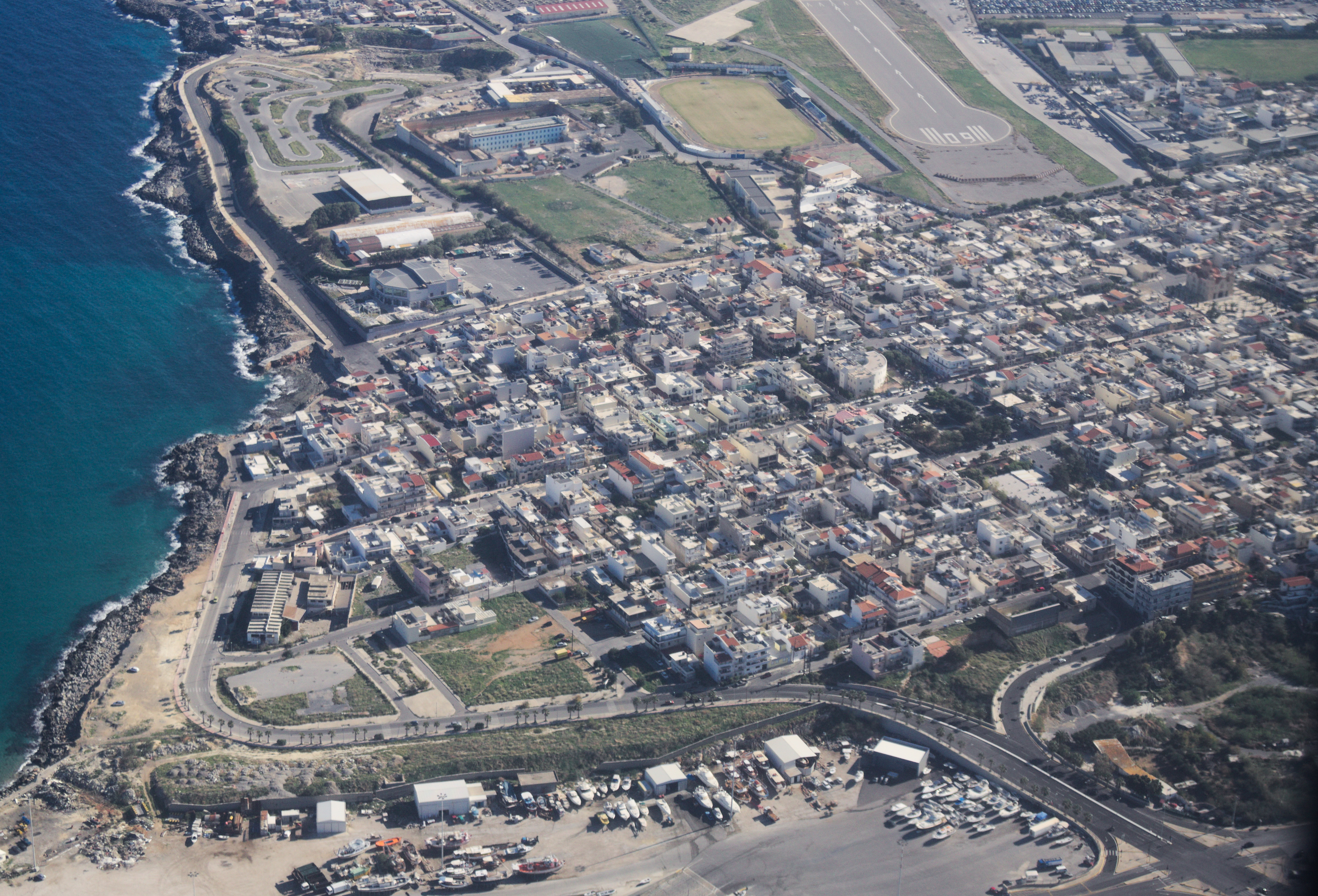
- Aerial photograph of Nea Alikarnassos

- Location within the regional unit

- Location within Greece
- Coordinates: 35°19′N 25°11′E
- Country: Greece
- Administrative region: Crete
- Regional unit: Heraklion
- Municipality: Heraklion
- City established: 1925 (101 years ago)

Area
  - Municipal unit: 16.1 km^{2} (6.2 sq mi)

Population (2021)
  - Municipal unit: 14,624
  - Municipal unit density: 908/km^{2} (2,350/sq mi)
  - Community: 13,090
- Time zone: UTC+2 (EET)
  - Summer (DST): UTC+3 (EEST)

Nea Alikarnassos (Greek: Νέα Αλικαρνασσός, meaning New Halicarnassus) is a town and a former municipality in the Heraklion regional unit of Crete, Greece. It is located within the urban area of Heraklion and since the 2011 local government reform it is part of the municipality of Heraklion, of which it is a municipal unit. The municipal unit has an area of 16.1 km^{2} and a population of 14,624 (2021). It is located on the north coast of the island and is served by the Nikos Kazantzakis International Airport. In the settlement of Prassas, the ruins of two Minoan houses have been discovered.

Nea Alikarnassos was founded in 1925 as a public housing development to accommodate the refugees, who were displaced following the Greco-Turkish War and subsequent population exchange, most being Greeks from today's Bodrum (Alikarnassos in Greek from the ancient Greek town Halicarnassus).

Heraklion's Hellenic Police headquarters are located within the area. Alongside sits a camp which houses (estimatedly) 500 Romani residents living under poverty conditions, having limited water supply and sewage management.

== Politics ==
The elections tend to reveal a domination of left-leaning parties. In the general elections of 2007 the distribution percentage of representatives were as follows: Panhellenic Socialist Movement (PASOK) 52.85% (2004: 54,54%), the conservative New Democracy 31,22% (2004: 33.84%), the Communist Party of Greece 8.97% (2004: 8.00%), the left Coalition of the Radical Left (SYRIZA) 3.15% (2004: 2.14%), the right Popular Orthodox Rally 1.61% (2004: 1.07%) and the Green Party 1.19%.

Evangelos Sisamakis (PASOK) was first elected mayor in 2003 and was reelected in 2006 with 63% of the votes in the first round.

== Sports ==
The town of Nea Alikarnassos hosts the Greek football club Irodotos FC, founded in 1932, with presence in Super League Greece 2.
