= Vasilios Vogiatzis =

Greek footballer

Personal information
- Full name: Vasilios Stefanos Vogiatzis
- Date of birth: 10 January 1996 (age 30)
- Place of birth: Heraklion, Crete, Greece
- Height: 1.82 m (6 ft 0 in)
- Position: Defensive midfielder

Team information
- Current team: Gela

Youth career
- 2008–2009: OFI Crete
- 2009–2011: Olympiacos
- 2011–2015: Ergotelis

Senior career*
Years	Team	Apps	(Gls)
2015–2019	Ergotelis	32	(2)
2015–2016	→ Ermis Zoniana (loan)	18	(1)
2019	→ Ierapetra (loan)	9	(2)
2019–2020	Ierapetra	22	(1)
2020	Rodos	0	(0)
2021	Ierapetra	22	(1)
2021–2022	Chania	2	(0)
2022	Kallithea	9	(0)
2022–2023	Rodos		
2023–2024	Giugliano	21	(0)
2024	→ Ancona (loan)	8	(0)
2024	Angri	13	(1)
2025	Rodos		
2026	Diagoras		
2026–	Gela	1	(0)
- * Club domestic league appearances and goals as of 6 September 2026

Vasilios Vogiatzis (Greek: Βασίλειος Βογιατζής; born 10 January 1996) is a Greek professional footballer who plays as a defensive midfielder for Serie D club SSD Città di Gela.

== Club career ==
On 20 July 2023, Vogiatzis signed a one-season contract with Giugliano in Italian third-tier Serie C.
