= Konstantinos Provydakis =

Greek footballer

Personal information
- Date of birth: 21 May 1996 (age 30)
- Place of birth: Heraklion, Crete, Greece
- Height: 1.74 m (5 ft 9 in)
- Position: Right-back

Team information
- Current team: Athens Kallithea
- Number: 24

Youth career
- –2013: Irodotos

Senior career*
Years	Team	Apps	(Gls)
2013–2016	Irodotos		
2016–2017	Ermis Zoniana		
2017–2019	Irodotos		
2019–2020	Ergotelis	21	(1)
2020–2023	Lamia	45	(1)
2023	→ Kifisia (loan)	14	(0)
2023	Makedonikos	9	(0)
2024	Doxa Katokopias	21	(0)
2024–2025	Chania	24	(2)
2025–2026	Hellas Syros	19	(2)
2026–	Athens Kallithea	3	(0)
- * Club domestic league appearances and goals as of 20 September 2026

Konstantinos Provydakis (Greek: Κωνσταντίνος Προβυδάκης; born 21 May 1996) is a Greek professional footballer who plays as a right-back for Super League 2 club Athens Kallithea.
