= List of Greek football transfers winter 2017–18 =

This is a list of Greek football transfers for the 2017–18 winter transfer window by club. Only transfers of clubs in the Super League and Football League are included.

The winter transfer window opened on 1 January 2018, although a few transfers took place prior to that date. The window closed at midnight on 1 February 2018. Players without a club may join one at any time, either during or in between transfer windows.

== Super League ==
=== AEK Athens ===
In:

No.	Pos.	Nation	Player
23	DF	SWE	Niklas Hult (from Panathinaikos)
24	MF	IRN	Masoud Shojaei (from Panionios)
39	MF	ESP	Erik Morán (from (Spain) Leganés)

Out:

No.	Pos.	Nation	Player
17	DF	BRA	Vinícius (to (Brazil) Chapecoense)
29	MF	ARG	Patito Rodríguez (to (Australia) Newcastle Jets)
30	MF	ISL	Arnór Ingvi Traustason (loan return to (Austria) Rapid Wien)
40	FW	GRE	Andreas Vlachomitros (on loan to Apollon Pontus)
—	MF	GRE	Ilias Tselios (on loan to Ergotelis)

=== AEL ===
In:

No.	Pos.	Nation	Player
8	MF	SRB	Radomir Milosavljević (from (Switzerland) Lugano)
15	DF	SRB	Aleksandar Gojković (from (Serbia) Radnik Surdulica)
23	DF	BUL	Hristofor Hubchev (from (Bulgaria) Dunav Ruse)
33	MF	SRB	Nemanja Mladenović (from (Serbia) Zemun)
81	DF	GRE	Vangelis Moras (from Panetolikos)
--	GK	GRE	Gennadios Xenodochof (from (Scotland) Motherwell)

Out:

No.	Pos.	Nation	Player
2	MF	ESP	Ximo Navarro (released)
5	DF	GRE	Georgios Kousas (to (Cyprus) Aris Limassol)
22	FW	GRE	Tasos Kritikos (on loan το Panserraikos)
23	DF	GHA	Owusu-Ansah Kontor (released)
26	DF	SVK	Pavol Farkaš (released)
30	FW	SRB	Siniša Babić (to (Serbia) Radnički Niš)
32	FW	GRE	Nikos Giannitsanis (to Trikala)

=== Apollon Smyrnis ===
In:

No.	Pos.	Nation	Player
6	MF	GRE	Stavros Tsoukalas (from Asteras Tripolis)
8	DF	ESP	Fonsi Nadales (from PAS Giannina)
13	DF	GRE	Giorgos Zisopoulos (from Atromitos)
25	DF	GRE	Giannis Stathis (from Platanias)
84	MF	SRB	Enver Alivodić (from (Serbia) Napredak Kruševac)
90	MF	ESP	Didac Devesa (from Platanias)
—	FW	IRL	Anthony Stokes (from Hibernian)

Out:

No.	Pos.	Nation	Player
6	DF	GRE	Georgios Dasios (to Panachaiki)
7	MF	POL	Bartłomiej Babiarz (to (Poland) Zagłębie Sosnowiec)
9	FW	FRA	Lynel Kitambala (released)
16	FW	NED	Nassir Maachi (to (Cyprus) Alki Oroklini)
22	DF	COD	Jonathan Bijimine (to (Czech Republic) Zlín)
23	DF	GRE	Nikos Vafeas (on loan to OFI)
28	DF	GRE	Vasilis Valianos (to Doxa Drama)
33	GK	GRE	Christos Mavridis (released)
91	GK	GRE	Michalis Zaropoulos (to Meteora)

=== Asteras Tripolis ===
In:

No.	Pos.	Nation	Player
39	MF	MAR	Nabil Jaadi (on loan from (Italy) Udinese)

Out:

No.	Pos.	Nation	Player
3	FW	CIV	Cedric Gondo (on loan to (Italy) Pescara)
13	MF	GRE	Stavros Tsoukalas (to Apollon Smyrnis)
22	DF	BRA	Igor Silva (to Olympiacos)
69	DF	CTA	Lionel Zouma (released)

=== Atromitos ===
In:

No.	Pos.	Nation	Player
11	FW	BRA	Bruno (on loan from (Austria) LASK Linz)
12	FW	GRE	Konstantinos Kotsopoulos (from Naousa)
23	DF	AUT	Emanuel Sakic (from (Austria) SCR Altach)

Out:

No.	Pos.	Nation	Player
3	DF	ESP	Joan Oriol (released)
13	DF	GRE	Giorgos Zisopoulos (to Apollon Smyrnis)
20	MF	GRE	Thomas Vasiliou (on loan to (Czech Republic) Olympia Prague)
22	FW	GRE	Michalis Bastakos (to Aris)
33	GK	GRE	Christos Theodorakis (on loan to Kallithea)
37	DF	BRA	Antônio Polidoro Junior (on loan to Kallithea)
—	FW	GRE	Dimitris Tsatsopoulos (on loan to Kallithea)
—	MF	GRE	Marios Pavlis (on loan to Kallithea)
—	DF	GRE	Dimitris Giataganakis (on loan to Ionikos)

=== Kerkyra ===
In:

No.	Pos.	Nation	Player
2	DF	NGA	Daniel Adejo (free agent)
3	DF	SRB	Nikola Leković (from (Belarus) Dinamo Minsk)
18	FW	CYP	Nestoras Mitidis (on loan from (Cyprus) AEK Larnaca)
70	DF	ITA	Lorenzo Menicagli (from Aiginiakos)
77	FW	GRE	Konstantinos Georgakopoulos (from Panegialios)
86	DF	ITA	Davide Grassi (from (Cyprus) Nea Salamina)
23	MF	ARG	Martín Rolle (from (Chile) O'Higgins)

Out:

No.	Pos.	Nation	Player
5	DF	GRE	Anastasios Venetis (retired)
8	DF	GRE	Aristidis Soiledis (released)
18	MF	EQG	Viera Ellong (to Platanias)
20	FW	GRE	Dimitris Melikiotis (loan return to AEK Athens)
30	DF	STP	Jordão Diogo (to Levadiakos)
80	DF	GRE	Dimitris Trepeklis (to A.E. Lefkimmi)
97	FW	GRE	Markeljan Misku (on loan to Apollon Larissa)

=== Lamia ===
In:

No.	Pos.	Nation	Player
17	MF	ESP	Armiche (from OFI)
24	FW	UKR	Yevhen Budnik (from Platanias)
34	DF	UKR	Vitaliy Pryndeta (from Platanias)
99	FW	SRB	Nikola Ašćerić (from (Malta) Valletta)
—	MF	MDA	David Andronic (from (Lithuania) FK Atlantas)
—	DF	TUN	Selim Ben Djemia (from (Bulgaria) Vereya)

Out:

No.	Pos.	Nation	Player
9	FW	CIV	Patrick Vouho (to OFI)
17	MF	ESP	Armiche (released)
28	MF	GRE	Ilias Tselios (loan return to AEK Athens)
33	FW	NGA	Macauley Chrisantus (to (Spain) Real Murcia)
99	FW	BRA	Alexandre D'Acol (to Trikala)

=== Levadiakos ===
In:

No.	Pos.	Nation	Player
9	FW	SRB	Marko Markovski (from Panetolikos)
30	DF	STP	Jordão Diogo (from Kerkyra)
42	MF	BFA	Souleymane Sawadogo (free agent)

Out:

No.	Pos.	Nation	Player
1	GK	MDA	Stanislav Namașco (released)
9	FW	BRA	Brandão (released)
11	FW	GRE	Stylianos Vasileiou (to Panachaiki)
23	DF	SEN	Jackson Mendy (released)

=== Olympiacos ===
In:

No.	Pos.	Nation	Player
2	DF	BRA	Igor Silva (from Asteras Tripolis)
11	FW	BEL	Kevin Mirallas (on loan from (England) Everton)
12	GK	CRO	Ivica Ivušić (from (Croatia) Istra 1961)
20	DF	IRN	Ehsan Hajsafi (from Panionios)

Out:

No.	Pos.	Nation	Player
18	MF	NOR	Tarik Elyounoussi (to (Sweden) AIK)
19	DF	CRO	Hrvoje Milić (released)
26	DF	SRB	Jagoš Vuković (on loan to (Italy) Hellas Verona)
29	FW	NGA	Emmanuel Emenike (on loan to (Spain) Las Palmas)
31	FW	COM	Ben Nabouhane (to (Serbia) Red Star Belgrade)
33	MF	MAR	Mehdi Carcela (loan return to (Spain) Granada)
44	MF	SRB	Saša Zdjelar (on loan to (Serbia) Partizan)
77	DF	POR	Diogo Figueiras (to (Portugal) Braga)
—	FW	GRE	Anastasios Karamanos (on loan to (Portugal) Feirense)

=== Panathinaikos ===
In:

No.	Pos.	Nation	Player
5	MF	ALB	Ergys Kaçe (on loan from PAOK)
9	FW	GRE	Giannis Mystakidis (on loan from PAOK)
18	FW	BRA	Luciano (from (Brazil) Corinthians, previously on loan)
20	DF	GRE	Evangelos Ikonomou (from Panionios)

Out:

No.	Pos.	Nation	Player
4	DF	GRE	Georgios Koutroumpis (to (Belgium) Standard Liège)
5	MF	POR	Nuno Reis (to (Portugal) Vitória Setúbal)
9	FW	ARG	Andrés Chávez (to (Argentina) Huracán)
11	FW	ECU	Bryan Cabezas (loan return to (Italy) Atalanta)
14	MF	SWE	Oscar Hiljemark (loan return to (Italy) Genoa)
19	MF	ARG	Lucas Villafáñez (to (Turkey) Alanyaspor)
23	DF	SWE	Niklas Hult (to AEK Athens)
29	MF	MLI	Yacouba Sylla (loan return to (France) Rennais)

=== Panetolikos ===
In:

No.	Pos.	Nation	Player
5	MF	ARG	Kevin Itabel (from (Argentina) Tigre)
88	DF	BRA	Arghus (from (Portugal) Braga B)
94	MF	BRA	Willyan (from (Portugal) Vitória de Setúbal)

Out:

No.	Pos.	Nation	Player
15	FW	SRB	Marko Markovski (to Levadiakos)
18	DF	GRE	Vangelis Moras (to AEL)
70	MF	BRA	Diego Lopes (loan return to (Portugal) Benfica)

=== Panionios ===
In:

No.	Pos.	Nation	Player
4	DF	POL	Krystian Nowak (from (Scotland) Heart of Midlothian)
6	MF	AUS	Peter Makrillos (from (Australia) Sydney Olympic)
9	MF	SUI	Mërgim Brahimi (from (Switzerland) Grasshoppers)
99	FW	DEN	Nicki Bille Nielsen (from (Poland) Lech Poznań)
--	MF	BRA	Washington (from (Portugal) Desportivo Aves)

Out:

No.	Pos.	Nation	Player
5	DF	GRE	Giannis Kargas (to (Belarus) Dynamo Brest)
6	DF	GRE	Evangelos Ikonomou (to Panathinaikos)
18	MF	GRE	Spyros Glynos (on loan to Kallithea)
28	DF	IRN	Ehsan Hajsafi (to Olympiacos)
72	MF	FRA	Kevin Tapoko (to (Cyprus) Aris Limassol)
77	MF	IRN	Masoud Shojaei (to AEK Athens)

=== PAOK ===
In:

No.	Pos.	Nation	Player
16	DF	BIH	Marko Mihojević (from (Bosnia and Herzegovina) Sarajevo)
30	DF	BRA	Márcio Azevedo (on loan from (Ukraine) Shakhtar Donetsk)
75	MF	FRA	Thibault Moulin (from (Poland) Legia Warsaw)

Out:

No.	Pos.	Nation	Player
2	DF	PER	Carlos Zambrano (loan return to (Russia) Rubin Kazan)
16	MF	BIH	Gojko Cimirot (to (Belgium) Standard Liège)
22	DF	GRE	Dimitris Konstantinidis (to (Italy) Brescia)
26	MF	ALB	Ergys Kaçe (on loan to Panathinaikos)
27	FW	GRE	Giannis Mystakidis (on loan to Panathinaikos)
60	MF	GRE	Giorgos Kakko (on loan to Panserraikos)
66	FW	ALB	Kristian Kushta (on loan to Aiginiakos)
68	FW	SRB	Bogdan Rangelov (on loan to A.E. Karaiskakis)
--	DF	GRE	Stergios Dodontsakis (on loan to Sparti)

=== PAS Giannina ===
In:

No.	Pos.	Nation	Player
11	DF	MKD	Mite Cikarski (from (Cyprus) Ethnikos Achna)
14	FW	SWE	Philip Hellquist (from (Sweden) Kalmar FF)

Out:

No.	Pos.	Nation	Player
14	FW	ARG	Jonathan Rodríguez (released)
22	MF	GRE	Chrysovalantis Kozoronis (to (Scotland) Hamilton Academical)
11	DF	ESP	Fonsi Nadales (to Apollon Smyrnis)
42	DF	GRE	Konstantinos Mavropanos (to (England) Arsenal)

=== Platanias ===
In:

No.	Pos.	Nation	Player
12	GK	SRB	Filip Kljajić (on loan from (Serbia) Partizan)
18	MF	EQG	Viera Ellong (from Kerkyra)
22	DF	ESP	Nili (from (Spain) Albacete)
23	MF	FRA	Mickael Malsa (on loan from (Netherlands) Fortuna Sittard)
25	MF	NGA	Chigozie Udoji (from (Norway) Lillestrøm)
28	FW	GRE	Antonis Petropoulos (from Doxa Drama)
99	FW	MNE	Filip Kasalica (from (Serbia) Napredak Kruševac)

Out:

No.	Pos.	Nation	Player
6	MF	FRA	Pierrick Cros (released)
7	FW	UKR	Yevhen Budnik (to Lamia)
13	FW	GRE	Dimitris Skouloudakis (released)
25	DF	GRE	Giannis Stathis (to Apollon Smyrnis)
34	DF	UKR	Vitaliy Pryndeta (to Lamia)
90	MF	ESP	Didac Devesa (to Apollon Smyrnis)

=== Xanthi ===
In:

No.	Pos.	Nation	Player
10	MF	SRB	Petar Đuričković (from (Serbia) Partizan)

Out:

No.	Pos.	Nation	Player
8	MF	GRE	Konstantinos Kostas (released)
15	DF	GRE	Okan Chatziterzoglou (on loan to Panserraikos)
22	MF	CRO	Goran Roce (released)
25	DF	GRE	Lazaros Orfanidis (to Panserraikos)

== Football League ==
=== A.E. Karaiskakis ===
In:

No.	Pos.	Nation	Player
13	FW	GRE	Alexandros Bekatoros (from Acharnaikos)
17	MF	GRE	Stergios Psianos (from Asteras Vlachioti)
18	MF	GRE	Nikos Kousidis (from (Finland) Jaro)
20	MF	GRE	Periklis Bousinakis (from Chalkida)
55	DF	GRE	Orestis Nikolopoulos (from Kalamata)
--	DF	POL	Sebastian Chruściel (from (Poland) Olimpia Grudziądz)
--	FW	SRB	Bogdan Rangelov (on loan from PAOK)

Out:

No.	Pos.	Nation	Player
3	DF	GRE	Georgios Filios (released)
4	DF	GRE	Apostolos Avramidis (released)
6	MF	GRE	Vasilios Moukidis (released)
19	MF	GRE	Lampros Baladimas (on loan to Skoufas Kompoti)
28	FW	GRE	Angelos Tsakalos (on loan to Skoufas Kompoti)
33	FW	GRE	Aristidis Michalis (released)

=== Aiginiakos ===
In:

No.	Pos.	Nation	Player
39	DF	GRE	Christos Intzidis (from Panegialios)
--	MF	SRB	Ivan Perić (from (Serbia) Bežanija)
--	FW	ALB	Kristian Kushta (on loan from PAOK)
--	DF	GRE	Panagiotis Petrousis (from Ialysos)

Out:

No.	Pos.	Nation	Player
11	FW	GRE	Giannis Domatas (to Ethnikos Piraeus)
14	MF	GRE	Stefanos Dogos (to Edessaikos)
15	DF	GRE	Anestis Karakostas (released)
16	DF	GRE	Doukas Lefidis (to Anagennisi Karditsa)
80	DF	ITA	Lorenzo Menicagli (to Kerkyra)

=== Anagennisi Karditsa ===
In:

No.	Pos.	Nation	Player
12	DF	GRE	Doukas Lefidis (from Aiginiakos)
13	DF	GRE	Antonis Vatousiadis (from Panegialios)
14	FW	GRE	Marios Karagiannis (from Achaiki)
17	FW	GRE	Dimitris Dagras (from AO Chania Kissamikos)
24	DF	GRE	Angelos Zisis (from Trikala)
27	FW	GRE	Vasilis Tsevas (from Acharnaikos)

Out:

No.	Pos.	Nation	Player
5	DF	GRE	Fotis Kiskabanis (released)
21	MF	GRE	Giorgos Tzellos (to Apollon Larissa)
24	DF	GRE	Stelios Pozatzidis (to Panserraikos)
--	MF	GRE	Konstantinos Koltsidas (to Sparti)

=== AO Chania Kissamikos ===
In:

No.	Pos.	Nation	Player

Out:

No.	Pos.	Nation	Player
2	DF	GRE	Stelios Mountokalakis (released)
16	FW	SRB	Marko Bačanin (released)
77	FW	GRE	Dimitris Dagras (to Anagennisi Karditsa)
99	MF	GRE	Themistoklis Potouridis (released)

=== Apollon Larissa ===
In:

No.	Pos.	Nation	Player
14	MF	THA	Chanawit Sansanit (from (Thailand) Saraburi TRU)
15	DF	GRE	Aristomenis Charalampopoulos (from Acharnaikos)
17	MF	GRE	Ilias Kotsiaridis (from Almyros)
19	FW	GRE	Thanasis Kanoulas (from Makedonikos)
33	FW	GRE	Apostolos Garyfallopoulos (from Niki Volos)
36	MF	GRE	Dimitris Dimolios (from Niki Volos)
45	FW	GRE	Markeljan Misku (on loan from Kerkyra)
--	MF	GRE	Giorgos Tzellos (from Anagennisi Karditsa)
--	DF	GRE	Dimitris Tsikrikas (from Zakynthos)

Out:

No.	Pos.	Nation	Player
9	FW	GRE	Vasilios Sachinidis (to Trikala)
10	MF	GRE	Petros Divanes (to Olympiacos Volos)
13	GK	GRE	Petros Kravaritis (released)
15	DF	GRE	Thanasis Savvas (released)
17	MF	GRE	Andreas Labropoulos (released)
19	FW	GRE	Christos Tzanis (released)
33	DF	GRE	Nikos Iordanidis (released)
36	MF	GRE	Paschalis Voutsias (released)
45	FW	SRB	Aleksandar Milić (released)

=== Apollon Pontus ===
In:

No.	Pos.	Nation	Player
10	MF	GRE	Antonis Iliadis (from Iraklis)
13	MF	GRE	Alexandros Tseberidis (from Kalamata)
40	FW	GRE	Andreas Vlachomitros (on loan from AEK Athens)

Out:

No.	Pos.	Nation	Player
10	FW	FRA	Gaël N'Lundulu (to Trikala)
12	GK	GRE	Stathis Vasiliadis (released)
14	FW	POR	Fábio Tavares (released)
27	MF	SRB	Vladan Milosavljev (to Trikala)
77	MF	GRE	Giannis Dounga (released)

=== Aris ===
In:

No.	Pos.	Nation	Player
--	MF	JOR	Angelos Chanti (from OFI)
--	FW	GRE	Michalis Bastakos (from Atromitos)
--	DF	GRE	Petros Kanakoudis (from (Finland) Inter Turku)

Out:

No.	Pos.	Nation	Player
9	FW	GRE	Antonis Kapnidis (to Doxa Drama)
55	MF	SRB	Ljubomir Stevanović (to Doxa Drama)

=== Doxa Drama ===
In:

No.	Pos.	Nation	Player
11	MF	SRB	Ljubomir Stevanović (from Aris)
18	FW	GRE	Alexandros Arnarellis (from Panegialios)
19	FW	GRE	Nikos Kouskounas (from OFI)
21	DF	GRE	Dimitris Siopis (from OFI)
--	DF	GRE	Vasilis Valianos (from Apollon Smyrnis)
--	FW	GRE	Antonis Kapnidis (from Aris)
--	FW	GRE	Giorgos Georgiadis (from (Cyprus) Ermis Aradippou)
--	MF	SRB	Miloš Jokić (from Trikala)

Out:

No.	Pos.	Nation	Player
6	MF	GRE	Dimitris Machairas (to OFI)
23	DF	GRE	Panagiotis Vlachos (to Ethnikos Piraeus)
28	FW	GRE	Antonis Petropoulos (to Platanias)
48	FW	SRB	Bogdan Rangelov (loan return to PAOK)

=== Ergotelis ===
In:

No.	Pos.	Nation	Player
13	DF	GRE	Manolis Nikolakakis (from (Sweden) Akropolis)
38	MF	GRE	Ilias Tselios (on loan from AEK Athens)
31	DF	GRE	Konstantinos Ikonomou (free agent)
15	MF	GHA	Albert Bruce (from Panegialios)

Out:

No.	Pos.	Nation	Player
88	FW	SEN	Ibrahima Ndiaye (loan return to (Egypt) Wadi Degla)
17	FW	GRE	Georgios Lydakis (on loan to Atsalenios)

=== Kallithea ===
In:

No.	Pos.	Nation	Player
30	MF	GRE	Marios Pavlis (on loan from Atromitos)
35	GK	GRE	Christos Theodorakis (on loan from Atromitos)
--	DF	BRA	Antônio Polidoro Junior (on loan from Atromitos)
--	FW	GRE	Dimitris Tsatsopoulos (on loan from Atromitos)
--	MF	GRE	Spyros Glynos (on loan from Panionios)
--	GK	ALB	Aldjon Pashaj (from Ionikos)
--	DF	AUS	Jordan Wilkes (from (Australia) Heidelberg United)
--	MF	GRE	Vasilios Karvounidis (from Acharnaikos)
--	FW	GRE	Marios Georgopoulos (from Acharnaikos)

Out:

No.	Pos.	Nation	Player
3	MF	GRE	Argyris Katsikas (on loan to Nea Peramos)
11	FW	BRA	Pablo Vinicius (to (Brazil) América de Natal)

=== OFI ===
In:

No.	Pos.	Nation	Player
5	DF	GRE	Nikos Vafeas (on loan from Apollon Smyrnis)
7	FW	GRE	Thanasis Dinas (from Trikala)
9	FW	CIV	Patrick Vouho (from Lamia)
66	MF	GRE	Dimitrios Machairas (from Doxa Drama)

Out:

No.	Pos.	Nation	Player
5	DF	GRE	Albert Roussos (to Panserraikos)
7	MF	ESP	Armiche (to Lamia)
9	FW	GRE	Nikos Kouskounas (to Doxa Drama)
10	MF	JOR	Angelos Chanti (to Aris)
23	DF	GRE	Dimitris Siopis (to Doxa Drama)

=== Panachaiki ===
In:

No.	Pos.	Nation	Player
--	FW	GRE	Stylianos Vasileiou (from Levadiakos)
--	DF	GRE	Georgios Dasios (from Apollon Smyrnis)

Out:

No.	Pos.	Nation	Player
11	FW	GRE	Giannis Spanos (to Diagoras Vrachnaiika)
23	FW	GRE	Giannis Gesios (released)

=== Panegialios ===
In:

No.	Pos.	Nation	Player

Out:

No.	Pos.	Nation	Player
4	DF	GRE	Antonis Vatousiadis (to Anagennisi Karditsa)
9	FW	GRE	Alexandros Arnarellis (to Doxa Drama)
29	GK	GRE	Dimitris Politis (to Panserraikos)
39	DF	GRE	Christos Intzidis (to Aiginiakos)
77	FW	GRE	Konstantinos Georgakopoulos (to Kerkyra)

=== Panserraikos ===
In:

No.	Pos.	Nation	Player
1	GK	GRE	Dimitris Politis (from Panegialios)
3	DF	GRE	Stelios Pozatzidis (from Anagennisi Karditsa)
13	MF	NGA	David Nazim (from (Slovenia) Ankaran)
14	MF	GRE	Giorgos Kakko (on loan from PAOK)
15	DF	GRE	Lazaros Orfanidis (from Xanthi)
21	FW	GRE	Tasos Kritikos (on loan from AEL)
27	MF	GRE	Vangelis Anastasopoulos (from Trikala)
29	FW	FRA	Ulrich N'Nomo (from (Portugal) Gil Vicente)
40	DF	GRE	Albert Roussos (from OFI)
--	MF	GRE	Ioannis Tsomos (free agent)
--	DF	GRE	Okan Chatziterzoglou (on loan from Xanthi)
--	GK	ISR	Ofek Antman (from (Israel) Hapoel Ra'anana)

Out:

No.	Pos.	Nation	Player
1	GK	GRE	Manolis Demenikos (released)
33	DF	GRE	Vasilios Chatzidimpas (released)

=== Sparti ===
In:

No.	Pos.	Nation	Player
55	DF	GRE	Stergios Dodontsakis (on loan from PAOK)
--	MF	GRE	Konstantinos Koltsidas (from Anagennisi Karditsa)

Out:

No.	Pos.	Nation	Player

=== Trikala ===
In:

No.	Pos.	Nation	Player
8	MF	GRE	Grigoris Makos (free agent)
10	FW	BRA	Alexandre D'Acol (from Lamia)
11	FW	GRE	Vasilios Sachinidis (from Apollon Larissa)
12	DF	GRE	Georgios Touglis (from Acharnaikos)
13	DF	BRA	Leandro Pinto (from (Cyprus) Doxa Katokopia)
27	MF	SRB	Vladan Milosavljev (from Apollon Pontus)
32	FW	GRE	Nikos Giannitsanis (from AEL)
40	GK	GRE	Nikos Gidopoulos (from Ialysos)
--	FW	FRA	Gaël N'Lundulu (from Apollon Pontus)

Out:

No.	Pos.	Nation	Player
8	MF	GRE	Konstantinos Tegousis (released)
10	MF	GRE	Giorgos Bountopoulos (released)
11	MF	SRB	Kristijan Miljević (released)
19	FW	SEN	Secouba Diatta (released)
22	DF	GRE	Michalis Giannitsis (released)
24	DF	GRE	Angelos Zisis (to Anagennisi Karditsa)
25	MF	GRE	Vangelis Anastasopoulos (to Panserraikos)
26	FW	GRE	Thanasis Dinas (to OFI)
82	GK	GRE	Christos Athanasopoulos (released)
87	MF	SRB	Miloš Jokić (to Doxa Drama)

=== Veria ===
In:

No.	Pos.	Nation	Player

Out:

No.	Pos.	Nation	Player
