= Apollon Smyrnis F.C. =

Apollon Smyrnis
- Full name: Απόλλων Σμύρνης (Apollon Smyrnis Football Club)
- Nicknames: Ελαφρά Ταξιαρχία (Light Brigade); Κυανόλευκοι (Blue-Whites)
- Founded: 1891; 135 years ago
- Ground: Georgios Kamaras Stadium
- Capacity: 14,200
- Chairman: Alexandros Koukas
- Manager: Sakis Tsiolis
- League: Gamma Ethniki
- 2025–26: Athens FCA First Division (Group 2), 1st (promoted)
- Website: www.apollongs.gr
Home colours	Away colours	Third colours

Apollon Smyrnis Football Club (Greek: Απόλλων Σμύρνης) is a professional football club based in Athens, Greece, which competes in the Gamma Ethniki.

It is part of GS Apollon Smyrnis (Γυμναστικός Σύλλογος Απόλλων Σμύρνης), a sports society that was founded in Smyrna, Ottoman Empire, by Anatolian Greeks in 1891 and is one of the oldest Hellenic sports clubs. Following the compulsory population exchange between Greece and Turkey the club was re-established in Athens in 1923 and is also known as Apollon Athens.

Apollon Smyrnis has also departments basketball, volleyball, water polo and other sports.

== History ==
=== Smyrna era (1891–1922) ===
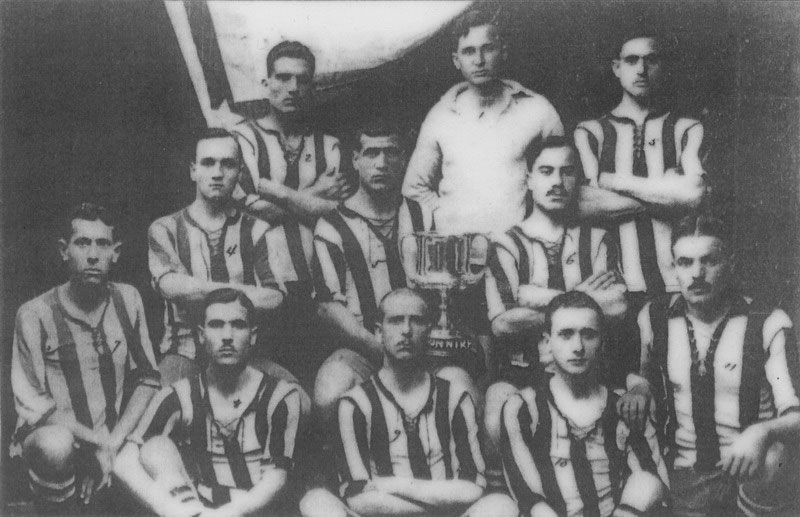
Apollon Smyrnis in 1919

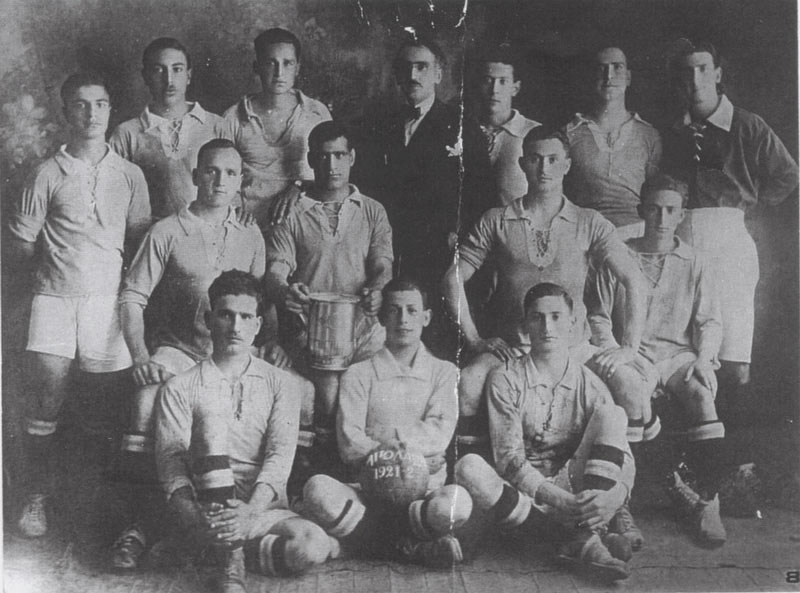
The football team in 1922

Apollon Smyrnis was founded in 1891 by former members of club Orpheus. Orpheus (subsequently Panionios) had been founded one year earlier in 1890. Among the founders of Apollon were prominent residents of Smyrna such as Chrysostomos of Smyrna and Vasilis Samios.

Roughly in the year 1893, the athletic department was organised. The first games of Smyrna took place in 1894, organized by the English sports fans of Bornova, a district in İzmir nowadays. In these games the athletes of Apollon achieved a lot of first victories. The person with the most wins was Theologos Anastasoglou, a glorious athlete who later became Olympic champion; he was most likely the best athlete from Apollon. The Games were always organized by English sports fans until 1903, with the attendance of the Gymnastic Association Apollon Smyrnis.

The third anniversary of the foundation of Apollon was celebrated joyously. Chairman N. Koulmasis gave the speech of the day, while the famous S. Pittakis spoke of Delphi and recited the anthem to the god Apollo. There was a special pedestal on which had been set up an altar to praise the god Apollo, while eight youths dressed in chlamydes sang the Pindariko anthem to Apollo.

In 1894, with the election of its new presiding board, Apollon adopted as its emblem three runners and at the same time it established an excursion department. Of the first excursions that were organized, one was to Ephesus and another to Aydın, in which the Russian scholar and historical Frigkol took part.

In 1894, the council of the Gymnastic Association of Apollon (Apollon Sports Club) was composed of chairman Mathaios Provatopoulos and Th. Vatidi, Jakovos Koulampidis, Grig. Sofianopoulos, G. Oikonomidis, A. Koulampidis and C. Papadimitriou. During this season the team acquired a privately owned ground. Initially, only its members fought on these. Later, however, it organized games in which other associations could also take part.

==== Apollon Smyrna's stadium ====
Apollon acquired its own stadium in 1894. Fourteen years before, in 1880, Ioannis Damvergis with Apostolos Psaltof, Stefanos Papamihalis and I. Makroulidis, all students of the Evangelic Faculty of Smyrna, created an off-hand gym in some open space, known with the name "love arena". After they opened the ground, they set up a perimeter using ropes because of a lack of money. Then, with hard economising, they bought a horizontal bar and other gymnastic equipment. The youth of Smyrna exercised there paying a symbolic price. Makroulidis was made cashier. This primitive gym constituted the precursor of the gym of Apollo, but was also the fountain for the later great athletes of the association. For this reason, the creator of this gym, Apostolos Psaltof, was called the "grandfather'" of Apollon. Later the gymnastic association "Apollon Smyrnis" moved to a space opposite the Greek Orphanage where was then built a big and modern gym in the district of Saint Tryfon, near the famous theatre "Terpsithea".

In 1901 Apollon organized the first boat races in Smyrna, with the attendance of the other big Smyrna association, "Panionios", which was founded in 1898 and came forth from the union of associations "Orpheus" and "Gymnasium".

==== Apollonian Games ====
On 6 and 8 May 1904, the Apollon Stadium of Bornova organised the first Apollonian Games with the attendance, not only of the organizers, the "Gymnastic Association Apollo Smyrnis" and the "Athletic Organization of Bornova", but also the "Athletic Union of Smyrni" as well. Remarkably, the making of these games was all under the supervision of prefect of Smyrni, Kiamil pasa, a measure of the huge scope and power of this association. The committee of the athletic games consisted of: Sokratis Solomonidis, Xristos Athanasoulas, Xenophon Dimas, Kostas Kotzias, Petros Mposkovik, A. Vanterze and Richard Whittes. The committee of ellanodikes was composed of Nikos Stavridis (chairman of Apollon), E. Fintao and D. Whittes. The opening ceremony for the first Apollonian Games started with a parade of all athletes under the sounds of music that was played by the orchestra of Apollon with director I. Magglis. The gymnastic association "Apollon Smyrnis" took part with 54 athletes. The biggest attraction was the 10 km run, won by L. Venizelos with a time of 34'43. Another popular game attraction was the sakodromies (small jumps), a race of 60 m, in which the runners were fully surrounded with cloth sacks up to their necks. Afterwards, at the end of the games, there was the handing-over of prizes and the athletes, followed by thousands of spectators and escorted by the orchestra of Apollo, walked to the railway station of Bornova, from where they took off to Smyrni by special train. From the railway station of Mpasmahane to the offices of the Apollon Gymnastic Association in the Bella Vista, a lampadidodromia (running with torches) took place. The "Apollonia" aka Apollonian Games were held in Smyrna, with exceptional success, ten times in total. In these games took part almost all athletic associations of Smyrna, Greek and foreign, except the Turkish clubs.

==== Rivalry between Apollon and Panionios ====
This period is also the beginning of the great rivalry between Apollon and Panionios, which has continued until modern times, although without any extremes. The point of contention was the claim of supremacy in the capital of Ionia. However, this antagonism was progressively blunted, since the men of Apollon were active mainly in football and went on to create one of the most powerful teams of Asia Minor and one of the three most important teams in Greek lands, whereas Panionios was focused on the track, producing some very important athletes. In 1904, Apollon took part in the Pan-Hellenic athletics that were organized in Athens. The city of Smyrna was represented by athletes from Panionios and Apollon. The athletes of the Gymnastic Association Apollon Smyrnis gained a lot of victories: Theologos Anastasoglou, Mathaios Despotopoulos, Kiros Alexiou, Dimitrios Mouratis and X. Lohner. Athenian man of letters, I. Damvergis, who represented Apollon in Athens, announced the news of the victories to Smyrna via telegraph. The chairman of Apollon answered: "We are grateful to you, give our congratulations to the champions." On May 1, 1905, the Apollon club celebrated with magnificence. With the music orchestra of Apollon at its head, the association organised a parade of all of the club athletes in the major streets of Smyrna. In 1906, common games were organized in Smyrna for the athletes of Apollon and Panionios. In these games victors for Apollon were the following athletes: Gounaris, Patestidis and K. Alexiou. In the same season, the Gymnastic Association Apollon Smyrnis suggested replacing the Apollonian and the Panionian Games of Smyrni with Pan Minor-Asian games. This effort, however, was not realised due to strong opposition from Panionios. In the same year (1906) Apollon took part in the Olympic Games of Athens (Middle Olympics). Its athletes Theologos Anastasoglou and Mathaios Despotopoulos were winners in pentathlon, writing yet another brilliant page in the history of the club.

==== The football team ====
1910 was an important year in the history of Apollon. During this year the football team of the club was founded, with a swastika as its emblem – a cross which is an ancient Greek symbol. The club competed in football matches with all the teams of Smyrna, as well as with teams of sailors on foreign navy ships that were harboured in the Ionian capital. In 1911, Apollon won a match against the team of the Austrian warship "Wirintous". It is notable that the Austrian admiral sent a congratulations telegram to the presiding board of Apollon. Important also is the victory achieved in 1918 against the almighty team of English warship "Minitor 19", the first warship that had sailed into the harbour of Smyrna, after the defeat of Turkey in the First World War.

In the Olympic Games of Antwerp (1920) the footballers of Apollon, A. Gkillis, D. Gottis, I. Zaloumis and Fotiadis, took part in the Greece national football team. The final accomplishment of Apollon in Smyrna was in 1922 when it gained the title of champion. Thousands of Apollon fans celebrated this huge success, that was to be the last before the destruction of Smyrna. In the football team of Apollon that year were: Kajsaris, Koygjoyntogloy, Tsarls, Taloymis, Mayromma'tis (Haralampakis), Hrysoylis, Kampoyropoylos, Samjos, Papagjannis, Gottis, Gkjlis, Alevizakis, Domeniko, Viglatsis, Zaloumis, Kimitsopoulos, Magoulas, Marselos and the goalkeepers Fotiadis (main) and Zeimpekis (substitute). Two of them, Marselos and Hrysoulis, were captured and remained forever on Ionian soil. Also, in Smyrna remained as captives, A. and G. Kyrou, members of the council of Apollon, as well as champion of track Kr. Persis, the traces of whom were lost from then on. The council of Gymnastic Association Apollon Smyrnis, on the last year at Smyrna was composed of: D. Marselos (chairman), J. Garyfalos (general secretary), A. Kyrou (special secretary), and Hatzithomas (cashier).

During the 2005/06 season Samuel Jolley was appointed interim manager, finishing in the top half of the table. Although the club did not continue his employment due to an obvious language barrier.

=== Apollon in Athens (1922–) ===
After the Greco-Turkish War and the expulsion of the Greeks from Asia Minor, Apollon moved to Athens. The club's first home ground was located at a place near the Greek Parliament called "Stiles Olympiou Dios" (Pillars of Olympian Zeus). Apollon stayed there for about 25 years, and after World War II the club's house was again transferred to an Athens neighbourhood called "Rizoupoli" and a stadium was built there, Georgios Kamaras Stadium, named after club legend Georgios Kamaras. The club has four departments: the football department called "Apollon Smyrnis FC", a basketball club called "Apollon BC", a volleyball club and a fighting department. The best known (and probably the most successful) department is the football club. Apollon FC participated in the Alpha Ethniki championship for many years, with the exception of seasons 1969–70, 1972–73, 1974–75, 1986–87. The team won the local Athens Championship five times, on 1924, 1928, 1938, 1948 and 1958.

Seasons 1994–95 and 1995–96 are the club's most successful seasons: In 1994–95, Apollon qualified for the 1995–96 UEFA Cup (preliminary round) where they played against Olimpija Ljubljana. Georgios Kamaras Stadium was not suitable for the game, so Apollon played in AEK Athens' home ground, Nikos Goumas Stadium. Apollon won 1–0 in Athens in front of 10,000 fans but lost 3–1 in Ljubljana and was eliminated (Olimpia scored 2 goals in the last 15 minutes). In those matches, many people noticed a young striker (just 21 years old at the time) who would become European football Champion almost ten years after; his name was Demis Nikolaidis. The following season, 1995–96, Apollon under the coaching of Giannis Pathiakakis and thanks to Demis Nikolaidis' capital scoring performances, reached the Greek Cup final after an excellent season, where they lost 7–1 to AEK Athens. In the same season, Apollon made one of the biggest victories in his history, defeating Olympiacos at Georgios Karaiskakis Stadium with 0–3, with an amazing goal of Demis Nikolaidis. After these great seasons, Apollon's glory started to fade and as a result, in the 1999–00 season Apollon was relegated to Beta Ethniki. Then, in 2005 it was relegated to Gamma Ethniki (South Group) and finally, in 2007, to Delta Ethniki (Group 8).

Apollon have gone since the 1930s under the nickname "The Light Brigade" (Greek: Ελαφρά Ταξιαρχία), named after the 1936 Hollywood movie The Charge of the Light Brigade, after winning the 1938 regional Athens championship.

==== Alamanos era (1979–2005) ====
In 1979, with the Greek football turning professional, Kostas Alamanos became the major shareholder and president of the team and remained so until 2005. He helped Apollon reach the UEFA Cup preliminary round in 1995 and the Greek Cup final in 1996, but after the departure of many of the team's best footballers, Apollon were unable to recover and in 2000 they were relegated.

==== Today ====
Apollon managed to return to the First Division in the 2012–13 season, with Stamatis Vellis, a business shipping magnate, as the new owner. On November 11, 2013, Apollon Smyrnis announced the signing of Northern Irish Lawrie Sanchez as head coach and as assistant coach Stephen Constantine. Their presence contributed to a significant harvesting of points in the second round of the championship, but it was not enough to keep Apollon in the Super League as it finished the penultimate and relegated. In 2014, Vellis resigned from the presidency of Apollon. He testified to the district attorney that the fate of the team depended on the actions of corrupt members of the Hellenic Football Federation, naming a number of officials currently accused in the 2015 Greek football scandal.

From 2015, Apollon Smyrnis is making a new effort with the Monemvasiotis family at the rudder. On 4 June 2017, Apollon Smyrnis were promoted to Super League alongside 2nd placed Lamia.

== Stadium ==
In 1880, Ioannis Dammergis, along with Apostolos Psaltoff, Stefanos Papamichalis and I. Makroulidis, created a snapshot in an open space, known as the "love of talani". In this stadium, young people from all over Smyrna were hired paying a penny. Makroulidis was appointed a treasurer. This primitive gym (fenced with a cloth rope) was the precursor of Apollon's gymnasium, as well as the hive for the later great athletes of the club. That's why the creator of this gymnasium, I. Psalof, called him "grandfather" of Apollon. Later, Apollon Smyrnis gymnasium moved to a place in front of the Greek Orphanage and then built a large and modern gym in the area of Tryfonas, near the famous theater "Terpsithea". In 1904, Apollon Smyrnis took over the organization of the Bornova Sports Games. For sports needs, Apollon renovates the Bornova stadium under the architect B. Liti and acquires a 400-meter track and capacity for 6,000 spectators.

With the destruction of Smyrna, Apollon Smyrnis was uprooted and came to Athens. The first station of his Odyssey, the Columns of Olympian Zeus. In an existing stadium, the team first moved into the new home. There they were first seat. There they took the first EPSA champion. But it remained only until 1924.

The second station is Rouf. The seat of the team is transferred and stays there until 1946. The current municipal stadium testifies about the location of the then facilities. Though then the stadium was adjacent to the church of St. Vasilios, which stands out in the background of photography. At this headquarters they once again took an EPSA champion.

In 1946 the club's installations were expropriated by the Railway Company and Apollon moved to Rizoupoli, next to Columbia's facilities. The stadium is inaugurated on October 17, 1948. Initially, the stadium of the current officials was built. In 1962 the opposite stand with the gates 8,9 and 10 was "found". And in 1971–72, the horseshoe of the stadium was constructed. Today, the capacity of the Rizoupoli Stadium is 14,200 seated spectators. And it now bears the name "Georgios Kamaras Stadium" in memory of one of the top footballers that the club has made.

== Trivia ==
- Apollon have gone since the 1930s under the nickname "The Light Brigade" (Greek: Ελαφρά Ταξιαρχία), named after the 1938 Hollywood movie The Charge of the Light Brigade, after winning the 1938 regional Athens championship.
- Since 1910 the team's badge was a swastika-like cross. But after the Nazi invasion of Europe it was changed to Apollo's head for obvious reasons.
- The last time a player of Apollon Smyrni was an active member of Greece was on May 8, 1996 (Demis Nikolaidis, Greece–Georgia 2–1). Since then, no player of Apollon has been a member of the national team.
- Georgios Kamaras Stadium was in bad shape during the 1990s, but it was renovated in 2002 by Olympiacos. Olympiacos used this stadium as their home ground until Karaiskákis Stadium was constructed in 2004.
- Kostas Alamanos was shareholder and team president from the late 1970s until 2005. He helped Apollon reach the UEFA Cup preliminary round and the Greek Cup final and for many years, was beloved by Apollon fans. But after these successful seasons, Alamanos became persona non grata for the fans, mainly because he sold many of the team's best footballers (Demis Nikolaidis, Blendar Kola and Theofilos Karasavvidis) and released most of the remaining team as free agents. The team was unable to recover from these losses, and in 2000 were relegated. That's why Apollon fans are calling Alamanos "The Unmentionable".
- Still today Apollon is the 9th team with respect to number of appearances in the top league of Greece (37/53).

== Crest and colours ==
The first emblem of the club, since 1894, was the three runners. In 1910, the football club's emblem becomes the ancient Greek conveyor, which will be removed even before World War II, given its already negative identification with National Socialism and Adolf Hitler. In the first post-war years, club jerseys simply write GSA (Gymnastics Association of Apollon). Later, the club's emblem is adopted with the bust of the god Apollo. The current crest depicts the head of Apollo Citharoedus (or Musagetes). The colours of the club are cyan (light blue) and white.

First

1923–24	1937–38	1937–38 (A)	2013–14	2014–15 (A)	2014–15 (A)

== Honours ==
Apollon Smyrnis honours
Type	Competition	Titles	Winners	Runners-up
Domestic	Alpha Ethniki (First-tier)	0		1937–38, 1947–48
Domestic	Beta Ethniki (Second-tier)	5	1969–70, 1972–73, 1974–75, 2012–13, 2016–17	
Domestic	Gamma Ethniki (Third-tier)	1	2011–12	
Domestic	Delta Ethniki (Fourth-tier)	1	2009–10	
Domestic	Greek Cup	0		1995–96
Regional	Athens FCA First Division	5	1923–24, 1937–38, 1947–48, 1957–58, 2025–26	

- record
- ^{S} Shared record

== European record ==
Season	Competition	Round	Club	Home	Away	Agg.	Qual.	Ref.
1995–96	UEFA Cup	1st Round	(Slovenia) Olimpija Ljubljana	1–0	3–1	2–3		

== League statistics ==
=== Positioning in Greek league ===
1960s	Position	1970s	Position	1980s	Position	1990s	Position	2000s	Position	2010s	Position	2020s	Position
1959–60	4th	1969–70 ↑	1st div.2	1979–80	17th	1989–90	15th	1999–00 ↓	17th	2009–10 ↑	1st div.4	2019–20 ↑	2nd div.2
1960–61	5th	1970–71	6th	1980–81	12th	1990–91	11th	2000–01	6th div.2	2010–11	6th div.3	2020–21	11th
1961–62	3rd	1971–72 ↓	17th	1981–82	15th	1991–92	5th	2001–02	12th div.2	2011–12 ↑	1st div.3	2021–22 ↓	14th
1962–63	8th	1972–73 ↑	1st div.2	1982–83	10th	1992–93	12th	2002–03	8th div.2	2012–13 ↑	1st div.2	2022–23 ↓	3rd div.2
1963–64	5th	1973–74 ↓	17th	1983–84	10th	1993–94	13th	2003–04	10th div.2	2013–14 ↓	17th	2023–24 ↓	12th div.3
1964–65	6th	1974–75 ↑	1st div.2	1984–85	11th	1994–95	4th	2004–05 ↓	14th div.2	2014–15	3rd div.2	2024–25	2nd div.4
1965–66	10th	1975–76	14th	1985–86	11th	1995–96	11th	2005–06	14th div.3	2015–16	4th div.2	2015–26 ↑	1st div.4
1966–67	11th	1976–77	16th	1986–87 ↓	15th	1996–97	9th	2006–07 ↓	14th div.3	2016–17 ↑	1st div.2		
1967–68	12th	1977–78	12th	1987–88 ↑	3rd div.2	1997–98	10th	2007–08	8th div.4	2017–18	14th		
1968–69 ↓	14th	1978–79	10th	1988–89	13th	1998–99	14th	2008–09	2nd div.4	2018–19 ↓	16th		

== Notable former players ==
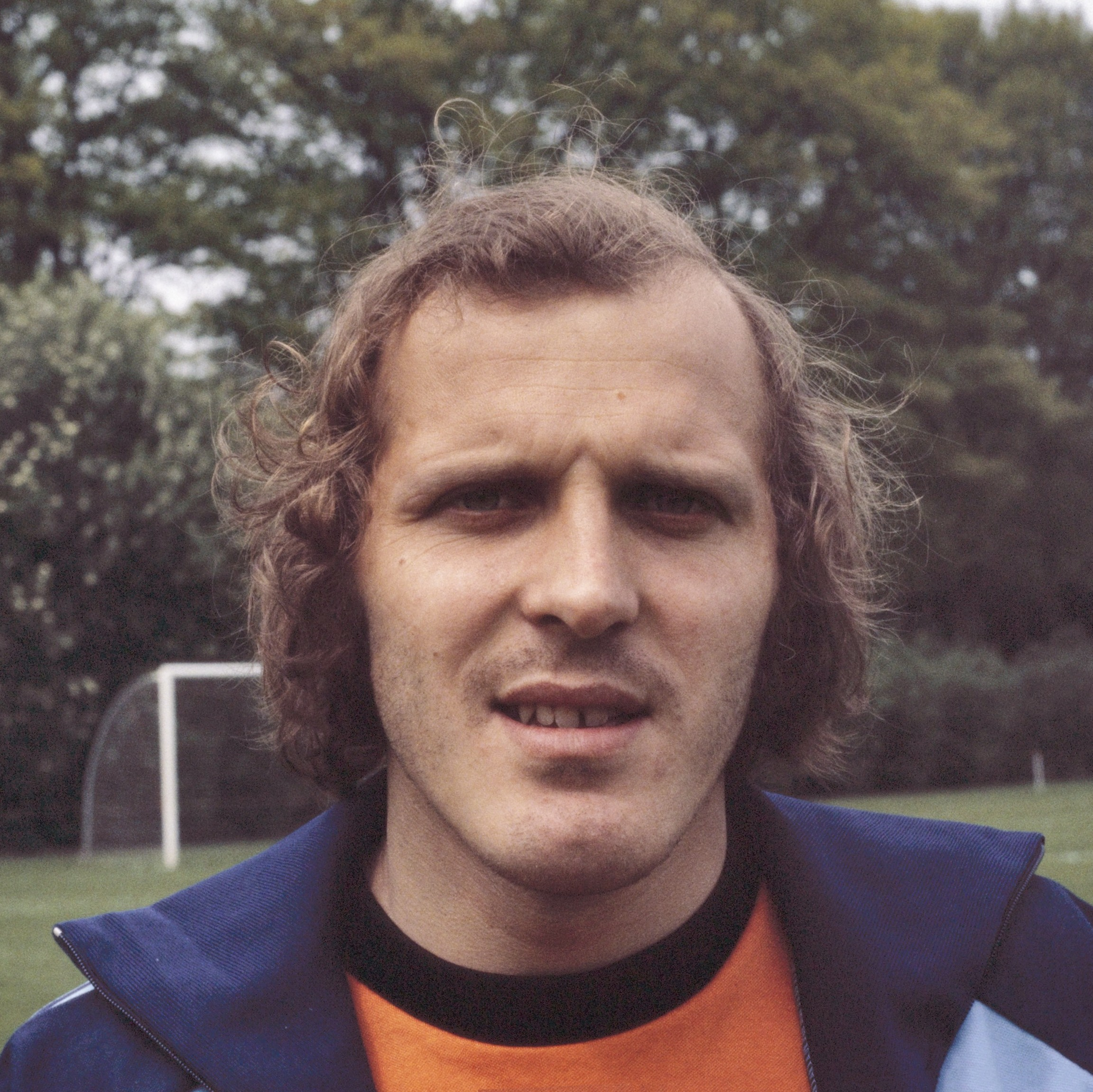
René van de Kerkhof

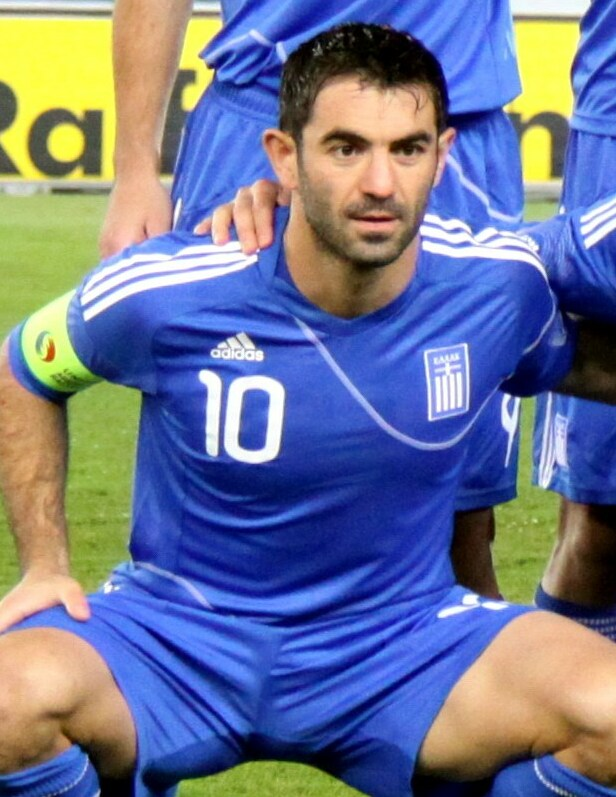
Giorgos Karagounis

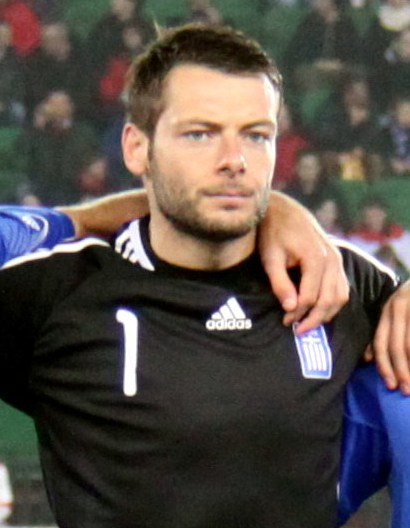
Alexandros Tzorvas

=== 1891-1922 ===
Greece

- (Greece) Agamenon Gilis
- (Greece) Vasilis Samios
- (Greece) Pantelis Magoulas
- (Greece) Dimitris Gotis
- (Greece) Antonis Fotiadis

=== 1922-present ===
Albania

- (Albania) Arjan Bellaj
- (Albania) Julian Gjeloshi
- (Albania) Edmond Dalipi
- (Albania) Indrit Fortuzi
- (Albania) Ilir Shulku
- (Albania) Ylli Shehu
- (Albania) (Greece) Giannis Thomas
- (Albania) (Greece) Thomas Daflas
- (Albania) (Greece) Bledar Kola
- (Albania) Alban Bushi
- (Albania) (Greece) Alexandros Retzos
- (Albania) (Greece) Simo Rrumbullaku
- (Albania) (Greece) Kristo Minga
- (Albania) (Greece) Fatjon Andoni
- (Albania) Aldjon Pashaj
- (Albania) (Greece) Alexandros Kouros
- (Albania) (Greece) Leonidas Rossi
- (Albania) (Greece) Klodian Gino
- (Albania) (Greece) Dejvid Janaqi
- (Albania) (Greece) Dejvid Rusta
- (Albania) Stavro Biraku
- (Albania) (Greece) Mario Selmanaj
- (Albania) Klevis Lacka
- (Albania) Artion Xhaferi
- (Albania) Antonio Bare
- (Albania) Bledar Kocecu
- (Albania) Eduard Dakaj
- (Albania) Oresti Shparthi
- (Albania) Kevin Broci
- (Albania) Giljem Shkrelaj
- (Albania) (Greece) Aleksandër Llambi
- (Albania) (Greece) Paolo Mataj
- (Albania) (Greece) Alexandros Llambi
- (Albania) (Greece) Alexandros Bakullati
- (Albania) (Greece) Alexandros Retzos
- (Albania) (Greece) Rindi Salla
- (Albania) (Greece) Serxhio Lamaj
- (Albania) (Greece) Orestis Aslani
- (Albania) Ardit Mesuli

Angola

- (Angola) (Portugal) Francisco Zuela

Argentina

- (Argentina) (Greece) Nestor Errea
- (Argentina) (Italy) Leandro Álvarez
- (Argentina) Adrián Lucero
- (Argentina) (Italy) Sebastián Bartolini
- (Argentina) (Poland) Sebastián Setti
- (Argentina) Juan Larrea
- (Argentina) (Italy) Diego Romano
- (Argentina) (Italy) Gastón González
- (Argentina) (Italy) Lucas Nanía
- (Argentina) (Italy) Joel Acosta
- (Argentina) Matías Defederico
- (Argentina) Matías Orihuela
- (Argentina) Axel Juárez
- (Argentina) Gonzalo Castillejos
- (Argentina) (Bolivia) Luis Salces
- (Argentina) Germán Rivero
- (Argentina) Javier Iritier
- (Argentina) Israel Coll
- (Argentina) (Portugal) Nico Martínez
- (Argentina) Braian Lluy
- (Argentina) Maximiliano Cuadra
- (Argentina) (Spain) Matías Odone
- (Argentina) (Italy) Germán Herrera

Armenia

- (Armenia) (Sweden) André Calisir

Australia

- (Australia) (Greece) Tzimis Alexiou
- (Australia) (Greece) Giorgos Chaniotis
- (Australia) (Greece) Christos Tomaras
- (Australia) (Greece) Antonis Tsiaras

Austria

- (Austria) Dietmar Berchtold

Belarus

- (Belarus) Mikalay Signevich

Belgium

- (Belgium) (Democratic Republic of the Congo) Japhet Muanza
- (Belgium) (Greece) Vassilis Mytilinaios
- (Belgium) (Democratic Republic of the Congo) Ritchie Kitoko
- (Belgium) Davino Verhulst

Bosnia-Herzegovina

- (Bosnia and Herzegovina) Davorin Juričić
- (Bosnia and Herzegovina) (Serbia) Velibor Pudar
- (Bosnia and Herzegovina) (Serbia) Dragan Glogovac
- (Bosnia and Herzegovina) Bernard Barnjak
- (Bosnia and Herzegovina) (Serbia) Predrag Erak

Brazil

- (Brazil) Joassis
- (Brazil) Rodrigo
- (Brazil) Willie
- (Brazil) Felipe Gomes
- (Brazil) Hegon
- (Brazil) Enrico
- (Brazil) (Greece) Paolo Farinola
- (Brazil) (Belgium) Dennis Souza
- (Brazil) (Greece) Marcos Bambam
- (Brazil) Wanderson
- (Brazil) (Portugal) Alípio
- (Brazil) Huanderson
- (Brazil) Domingues
- (Brazil) (Italy) Thomás Bedinelli
- (Brazil) Lucas Mazetti
- (Brazil) Vitor Hugo Pinheiro

Bulgaria

- (Bulgaria) Martin Goranov
- (Bulgaria) Tihomir Todorov
- (Bulgaria) Ivan Rusev
- (Bulgaria) Ivan Gyurov

Burkina Faso

- (Burkina Faso) (Ivory Coast) Abdul Diallo

Cameroon

- (Cameroon) Nicolas Dikoumé
- (Cameroon) Guy Bwelle
- (Cameroon) Michel Pensée

Canada

- (Canada) (Kosovo) Lorik Sadiku

Colombia

- (Colombia) Fabry Castro
- (Colombia) Dylan Talero

Croatia

- (Croatia) Mario Bonić
- (Croatia) Stojan Belajić
- (Croatia) Andrej Lukić
- (Croatia) Karlo Bručić
- (Croatia) Ivan Čović

Cyprus

- (Cyprus) Lefteris Kouis
- (Cyprus) (Greece) Stavros Tsoukalas
- (Cyprus) Giorgos Papageorgiou

Czech Republic

- (Czech Republic) Frantisek Stambacher
- (Czech Republic) Jan Blažek

DR Congo

- (Democratic Republic of the Congo) (France) Jonathan Bijimine

Egypt

- (Egypt) (Sudan) Shikabala

England

- (England) Darren Ambrose
- (England) Lee Cook

France

- (France) (Ivory Coast) Joël Thomas
- (France) Jonathan Parpeix
- (France) (Democratic Republic of the Congo) Lynel Kitambala
- (France) (Cameroon) Kevin Tapoko
- (France) Anthony Mounier
- (France) (Cape Verde) Michaël Pereira

Finland

- (Finland) (Greece) Alexandros Souflas

Georgia

- (Georgia (country)) Nika Nozadze

Germany

- (Germany) Walter Kelsch
- (Germany) (Ghana) Kofi Schulz
- (Germany) (Italy) Kevin Pezzoni
- (Germany) (Greece) Christos Agrodimos
- (Germany) (Greece) Nikolaos Ioannidis
- (Germany) (Greece) Ilias Kyritsis
- (Germany) (Greece) Panagiotis Triadis
- (Germany) Justin Eilers

Ghana

- (Ghana) (Italy) Raman Chibsah
- (Ghana) (Sweden) Sadat Karim

Greece

- (Greece) Christos Albanis
- (Greece) Alexandros Anagnostopoulos
- (Greece) Ilias Anastasakos
- (Greece) Nikos Anastasopoulos
- (Greece) Kostas Antoniou
- (Greece) Leonidas Argyropoulos
- (Greece) Alexandros Arnarellis
- (Greece) Lefteris Astras
- (Greece) Giorgos Athanasiadis
- (Greece) Giannis Bastianos
- (Greece) Kostas Batsinilas
- (Greece) Giorgos Barkoglou
- (Greece) Dimos Baxevanidis
- (Greece) Kostas Chalkias
- (Greece) Konstantinos Chatzis
- (Greece) Georgios Chatzizisis
- (Greece) Stratos Chintzidis
- (Greece) Diamantis Chouchoumis
- (Greece) Filipos Darlas
- (Greece) Georgios Dasios
- (Greece) Georgios Delizisis
- (Greece) Antonis Dentakis
- (Greece) Dimitris Diamantis
- (Greece) Dimitrios Diamantopoulos
- (Greece) Giannis Dontas
- (Greece) Giannoulis Fakinos
- (Greece) Iraklis Garoufalias
- (Greece) Nikos Giannakopoulos
- (Greece) Giannis Gianniotas
- (Greece) Vasilis Golias
- (Greece) Vangelis Gotovos
- (Greece) Giorgos Goumagias
- (Greece) Christos Gromitsaris
- (Greece) Konstantinos Iasonidis
- (Greece) Takis Ikonomopoulos
- (Greece) Andreas Iraklis
- (Greece) Giorgos Kamaras
- (Greece) Giorgos Karagounis
- (Greece) Thanasis Karagounis
- (Greece) Dimitris Kalogerakos
- (Greece) Aristidis Kamaras
- (Greece) Giorgos Kamaras
- (Greece) Theofilos Karasavvidis
- (Greece) Stathis Karamalikis
- (Greece) Nikos Karoulias
- (Greece) Charis Karpozilos
- (Greece) Paschalis Kassos
- (Greece) Giannis Katsikis
- (Greece) Dimos Kavouras
- (Greece) Kostas Kiassos
- (Greece) Vasilios Kinalis
- (Greece) Thanasis Kolitsidakis
- (Greece) Pantelis Konstantinidis
- (Greece) Giannis Kontoes
- (Greece) Dimitrios Kottaras
- (Greece) Konstantinos Kotsaris
- (Greece) Michalis Koronis
- (Greece) Nikos Korovesis
- (Greece) Michalis Kyrgias
- (Greece) Anastasios Kyriakos
- (Greece) Vasilis Kyriakou
- (Greece) Anastasios Lagos
- (Greece) Panagiotis Lagos
- (Greece) Sotiris Leontiou
- (Greece) Christos Lisgaras
- (Greece) Michalis Manias
- (Greece) Vasilis Mastrakoulis
- (Greece) Christos Mavridis
- (Greece) Kostas Mavridis
- (Greece) Konstantinos Mavropanos
- (Greece) Panagiotis Moraitis
- (Greece) Lampros Moustakas
- (Greece) Antonis Minou
- (Greece) Tasos Mitropoulos
- (Greece) Thomas Nazlidis
- (Greece) Demis Nikolaidis
- (Greece) (Albania) Sotiris Ninis
- (Greece) Georgios Pamlidis
- (Greece) Xenofon Panos
- (Greece) Grigoris Papazacharias
- (Greece) Anastasios Papazoglou
- (Greece) Athanasios Panteliadis
- (Greece) Anastasios Pastos
- (Greece) Manolis Patralis
- (Greece) Antonis Petropoulos
- (Greece) Eleftherios Poupakis
- (Greece) Stergios Psianos
- (Greece) Vasilios Rovas
- (Greece) Antonis Rigopoulos
- (Greece) Achilleas Sarakatsanos
- (Greece) Savvas Siatravanis
- (Greece) Giannis Siderakis
- (Greece) Dimitris Svoronos
- (Greece) Dimitris Sounas
- (Greece) Angelos Stamatopoulos
- (Greece) Savvas Tsabouris
- (Greece) Konstantinos Tsamouris
- (Greece) Alexandros Tseberidis
- (Greece) Timotheos Tselepidis
- (Greece) Sotiris Tsiloulis
- (Greece) Ilias Tsiligiris
- (Greece) Sokratis Tsoukalas
- (Greece) Adam Tzanetopoulos
- (Greece) Christos Tzioras
- (Greece) Alexandros Tzorvas
- (Greece) Nikos Vafeas
- (Greece) Georgios Valerianos
- (Greece) Giannis Varkas
- (Greece) Lefteris Velentzas
- (Greece) Vasilios Vitlis
- (Greece) Michalis Vlachos
- (Greece) Michalis Zaropoulos

Hungary

- (Hungary) András Béres
- (Hungary) Imre Katzenbach

Iran

- (Iran) Alireza Mansourian

Ireland

- (Republic of Ireland) Anthony Stokes

Israel

- (Israel) (Greece) Christos Ardizoglou
- (Israel) (Morocco) Eli Elbaz

Italy

- (Italy) Christian D'Urso

Ivory Coast

- (Ivory Coast) Franck Manga Guela
- (Ivory Coast) Emmanuel Koné
- (Ivory Coast) (Portugal) Patrick Vouho
- (Ivory Coast) (France) Ghislain Guessan

Kazakhstan

- (Kazakhstan) (Greece) Leonidas Kyvelidis

Kenya

- (Kenya) Erick Oduol

Kosovo

- (Kosovo) (Germany) Besar Halimi

Lebanon

- (Lebanon) (Germany) Hilal El-Helwe

Liberia

- (Liberia) (Equatorial Guinea) Lawrence Doe

Lithuania

- (Lithuania) Vykintas Slivka

Malta

- (Malta) (Nigeria) Sunday Eboh

Montenegro

- (Montenegro) Denis Tonkovic

Morocco

- (Morocco) Adil Rhaili

Netherlands

- (Netherlands) René van de Kerkhof
- (Netherlands) (Suriname) Raymond Graanoogst
- (Netherlands) (Morocco) Nassir Maachi
- (Netherlands) (Suriname) Darren Maatsen
- (Netherlands) (Indonesia) Jordy Tutuarima
- (Netherlands) (Suriname) Rajiv van La Parra

Nicaragua

- (Nicaragua) (Greece) Armando Goufas

Nigeria

- (Nigeria) (Greece) Jerry Ugen
- (Nigeria) Ativie Guy Ijiebor Ativie
- (Nigeria) (Poland) Dominic Okanu
- (Nigeria) Christian Obodo
- (Nigeria) (Sweden) Abiola Dauda
- (Nigeria) (Italy) Jerry Mbakogu
- (Nigeria) John Eboh

North Macedonia

- (North Macedonia) (Bulgaria) Nikola Jakimovski

Norway

- (Norway) Arne Dokken
- (Norway) Thomas Rogne

Poland

- (Poland) Zygmunt Kukla
- (Poland) Józef Wandzik
- (Poland) Waldemar Adamczyk
- (Poland) Artur Blazejewski
- (Poland) Marcin Kubsik
- (Poland) Bartłomiej Babiarz

Portugal

- (Portugal) (Brazil) Bruno Pinheiro
- (Portugal) Hugo Faria
- (Portugal) João Pedro
- (Portugal) (Brazil) Bruno Alves
- (Portugal) (Cape Verde) Manuel Fernandes

Romania

- (Romania) Florentin Matei

Russia

- (Russia) (Greece) Yuri Droznt

Senegal

- (Senegal) (Guinea) (France) Henri Camara

Serbia

- (Serbia) Enver Alivodić
- (Serbia) Lazar Arsić
- (Serbia) Rajko Banjac
- (Serbia) Goran Bošković
- (Serbia) Marko Blažić
- (Serbia) Zoran Ćirić
- (Serbia) Jovica Damjanović
- (Serbia) Danko Filipović
- (Serbia) Dejan Đurđević
- (Serbia) Petar Gusic
- (Serbia) Nebojsa Jemović
- (Serbia) Zoran Jevtović
- (Serbia) Milenko Kovačević
- (Serbia) Milan Majstorović
- (Serbia) Radovan Marković
- (Serbia) (Greece) Marko Markovski
- (Serbia) (Sweden) (Greece) Kristijan Miljević
- (Serbia) (Greece) Vladan Milojević
- (Serbia) Nenad Nikolić
- (Serbia) Miloje Petković
- (Serbia) Milorad Rajović
- (Serbia) Srđan Savičević
- (Serbia) Dragan Stevanović
- (Serbia) (Greece) Markos Touroukis
- (Serbia) (Switzerland) Vaso Vasić

Sierra Leone

- (Sierra Leone) John Kamara
- (Sierra Leone) (England) Kevin Wright

Slovakia

- (Slovakia) (Hungary) Vojtech Kiss

Slovenia

- (Slovenia) Grega Sorčan

Spain

- (Spain) Añete
- (Spain) Igor Angulo
- (Spain) David López Nadales
- (Spain) Didac Devesa
- (Spain) Boris Garrós
- (Spain) Marc Fernández

Sweden

- (Sweden) Björn Enqvist
- (Sweden) Goran Trpevski
- (Sweden) Axel Schylström
- (Sweden) Mikael Dahlberg
- (Sweden) Tom Söderberg

Switzerland

- (Switzerland) (Greece) Joanis Vagias
- (Switzerland) Gabriel Lüchinger

Togo

- (Togo) Paul Adado

Tunisia

- (Tunisia) (France) Wajdi Sahli

Ukraine

- (Ukraine) Mykhaylo Mykhaylov
- (Ukraine) Ruslan Fomin

United States

- (United States) (Greece) Frank Klopas
- (United States) (Greece) Evangelo Spartiatis

Uruguay

- (Uruguay) Miguel Falero
- (Uruguay) Luis Fernández
- (Uruguay) Gonzalo González
- (Uruguay) (Italy) Joaquín Perdomo

Uzbekistan

- (Uzbekistan) (Bulgaria) Georgi Georgiev

== Managers ==
- (Bulgaria) Manol Manolov (July 1, 1979 – June 30, 1980)
- (Socialist Federal Republic of Yugoslavia) Tomislav Kaloperović (July 1, 1988 – June 30, 1989)
- (Germany) Gerhard Prokop (July 1, 1989 – June 30, 1990)
- (Austria) Walter Skocik (July 1, 1990 – June 30, 1991)
- (Greece) Christos Archontidis (July 1, 1998 – Sept 3, 1999)
- (Greece) Stathis Stathopoulos (July 1, 2011 – March 20, 2012)
- (Greece) Giannis Georgaras (March 19, 2012 – June 30, 2012)
- (Albania) Bledar Kola (July 21, 2012 – Aug 7, 2012)
- (Greece) Alexandros Vosniadis (Aug 7, 2012 – Oct 8, 2013)
- (Greece) Babis Tennes (Oct 10, 2013 – Nov 11, 2013)
- (Northern Ireland) Lawrie Sanchez (Nov 17, 2013 – June 16, 2014)
- (Greece) Nikos Kostenoglou (July 1, 2014 – December 8, 2014)
- (Greece) Alexandros Vosniadis (December 12, 2014 – November 2, 2015)
- (Greece) Babis Tennes (Nov 3, 2015 – March 29, 2016)
- (Greece) Konstantinos Panagopoulos (Apr 2, 2016 – Apr 18, 2016)
- (Greece) Georgios Vazakas (Apr 18, 2016 – Jun 6, 2016)
- (Greece) Dimitrios Spanos (Jun 9, 2016 – Dec 24, 2016)
- (Greece) Apostolos Mantzios (Dec 29, 2016 – June 20, 2018)
- (France) Valérien Ismaël (June 22, 2018 – August 27, 2018)
- (Spain) Alberto Monteagudo (August 31, 2018 – October 3, 2018)
- (Greece) Giannis Matzourakis (October 3, 2018 – November 26, 2018)
- (Greece) Babis Tennes (November 27, 2018 – March 9, 2019)
- (Greece) Lefteris Velentzas (March 9, 2019 – May 23, 2019)
- (Greece) Nikolaos Papadopoulos (July 1, 2019 – January 8, 2020)
- (Greece) Babis Tennes (January 8, 2020 – September 2, 2020)
- (Greece) Georgios Paraschos (September 10, 2020 – March 16, 2021)
- (Greece) Makis Chavos (March 17, 2021 – May 28, 2021)
- (Greece) Giannis Petrakis (June 1, 2021 – September 22, 2021)
- (Italy) Gianluca Festa (September 22, 2021 - January 6, 2022)
- (Greece) Babis Tennes (February 26, 2022 – June 30, 2022)
- (Greece) Giannis Tatsis (July 13, 2022 – February 6, 2023)
- (Greece) Alekos Vosniadis (February 17, 2023 – May 7, 2023)
- (Costa Rica) Rónald Gómez (August 10, 2023 – February 28, 2024)
- (Greece) Vangelis Stavrakopoulos (February 28, 2024 – April 16, 2024)
- (Greece) Giannis Georgaras (April 17, 2024 – November 3, 2024)
- (Greece) Sakis Tsiolis (November 5, 2024 – present)

== See also ==
- GS Apollon Smyrnis
