= Mavridis =

Mavridis (Greek: Μαυρίδης) is a Greek surname. Notable people with the surname include:

- Christos Mavridis (born 1998), Greek footballer
- Kostas Mavridis (born 1962), Greek footballer
- Nikolaos Mavridis (born 1973), Greek artificial intelligence researcher
