= Giannis Georgaras =

Greek footballer

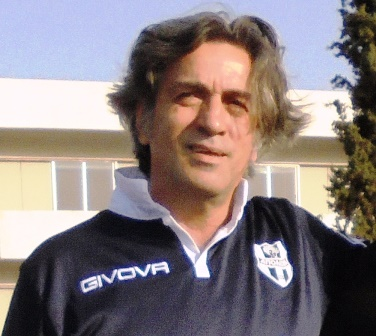

Personal information
- Full name: Ioannis Georgaras
- Date of birth: 4 November 1956 (age 69)
- Place of birth: Athens, Greece
- Height: 1.78 m (5 ft 10 in)
- Position: Midfielder

Managerial career
- Years: Team
- 2004: Ethnikos Asteras
- 2007: Apollon Smyrnis
- 2012: Apollon Smyrnis
- 2014: Triglia Rafinas
- 2017–2018: Ermis Aradippou (technical director)
- 2019: Aiolikos
- 2023: Panachaiki
- 2024: Apollon Smyrnis

Giannis Georgaras (Greek: Γιάννης Γεωργαράς; born 4 November 1956) is a Greek football manager.
