= Lucas Nanía =

Argentine footballer (born 1984)

Personal information
- Full name: Lucas Sebastián Nanía Machain
- Date of birth: January 14, 1984 (age 42)
- Place of birth: Buenos Aires, Argentina
- Height: 1.70 m (5 ft 7 in)
- Position: Midfielder

Youth career
- San Lorenzo

Senior career*
| Years | Team | Apps | (Gls) |
| 2004–2005 | San Lorenzo | 0 | (0) |
| 2005 | → Palestino (loan) | 37 | (5) |
| 2006 | Estudiantes de Mérida | 9 | (2) |
| 2007 | Deportivo Pereira | 16 | (2) |
| 2007–2008 | San Martín SJ | 14 | (0) |
| 2008 | Defensa y Justicia | 0 | (0) |
| 2008–2010 | Ferro Carril Oeste | 62 | (5) |
| 2010 | Everton | 16 | (1) |
| 2011 | Vitória | 3 | (0) |
| 2011–2012 | Huracán | 15 | (2) |
| 2012–2013 | Independiente Rivadavia | 21 | (0) |
| 2013–2014 | Atlanta | 36 | (4) |
| 2014–2015 | Apollon Smyrnis | 5 | (1) |
| 2015 | Deportivo Morón | 12 | (1) |
| 2016 | Defensores de Belgrano | 4 | (0) |
| Total | | 250 | (24) |
- * Club domestic league appearances and goals

Lucas Sebastián Nanía Machain (born January 14, 1984, in Buenos Aires, Argentina), commonly known as Lucas Nanía, is an Argentine former football midfielder.

== Career ==
He started his career playing for San Lorenzo then he was loaned to Palestino of Chile to gain experience. After a successful stint at the Chilean club, he returned to Argentina as a promising player, however he was not used by the head coach, making the midfielder transfer to Estudiantes de Mérida, of Venezuela.

After a season in the Venezuelan club, he was loaned to Deportivo Pereira, of Colombia, playing the 2007 season. Nanía was then transferred to San Martín de San Juan and after that to Ferro Carril Oeste, where he had a successful performance, staying in the club for two seasons.

In the second half of 2010, he joined Everton, where he played a few games. He then joined Vitória of Brazil to play in the 2011 season, but made no appearances at all. On July 20, 2011, Lucas joined Primera B Nacional club Independiente Rivadavia.
