= Antonis Rigopoulos =

Greek footballer

Personal information
- Full name: Antonios Rigopoulos
- Date of birth: 10 June 2004 (age 22)
- Place of birth: Greece
- Height: 1.74 m (5 ft 9 in)
- Position: Left-back

Team information
- Current team: Makedonikos
- Number: 66

Youth career
- 2020–2021: Apollon Smyrnis

Senior career*
Years	Team	Apps	(Gls)
2021	Apollon Smyrnis	1	(0)
2021–2022	Olympiacos Volos	1	(0)
2022–	Makedonikos	0	(0)
- * Club domestic league appearances and goals as of 22 December 2022

Antonis Rigopoulos (Greek: Αντώνης Ρηγόπουλος; born 10 June 2004) is a Greek professional footballer who plays as a left-back for Super League 2 club Makedonikos.
