= Angelos Stamatopoulos =

Greek footballer

Personal information
- Date of birth: 23 April 1997 (age 29)
- Place of birth: Athens, Greece
- Height: 1.87 m (6 ft 2 in)
- Position: Goalkeeper

Team information
- Current team: AE Moschatou

Youth career
- –2014: Apollon Smyrnis
- 2015–2016: Olympiacos
- 2016–2017: Panetolikos

Senior career*
Years	Team	Apps	(Gls)
2014	Apollon Smyrnis	0	(0)
2014–2015	Kozani		
2015–2016	Olympiacos	0	(0)
2016–2019	Panetolikos	0	(0)
2018–2019	→ Sparta (loan)	7	(0)
2019	→ Nafpaktiakos Asteras (loan)		
2019–2020	Diagoras	0	(0)
2020	Egaleo	0	(0)
2020	Karaiskakis	0	(0)
2020–2021	Nafpaktiakos Asteras	0	(0)
2021	Thyella Rafina	3	(0)
2021–2022	Panionios		
2022	Kyanous Asteras Varis		
2022–	AE Moschatou		
- * Club domestic league appearances and goals as of 11 July 2021

Angelos Stamatopoulos (Greek: Άγγελος Σταματόπουλος; born 23 April 1997) is a Greek professional footballer who plays as a goalkeeper.
