= Bogdan Rangelov =

Serbian footballer

Personal information
- Date of birth: 28 August 1997 (age 29)
- Place of birth: Niš, FR Yugoslavia
- Height: 1.77 m (5 ft 10 in)
- Position: Attacking midfielder

Team information
- Current team: TSV Bernhausen
- Number: 25

Youth career
- Radnički Niš
- Red Star Belgrade
- 2015–2016: PAOK

Senior career*
| Years | Team | Apps | (Gls) |
| 2016–2018 | PAOK | 0 | (0) |
| 2016–2017 | → Aiginiakos (loan) | 19 | (6) |
| 2017–2018 | → Doxa Dramas (loan) | 0 | (0) |
| 2018 | → Karaiskakis (loan) | 14 | (0) |
| 2019–2021 | SV Babelsberg 03 | 42 | (8) |
| 2021–2023 | 1. FC Lokomotive Leipzig | 60 | (7) |
| 2023–2024 | Calcio Leinfelden-Echterdingen | 18 | (2) |
| 2024 | OFK Beograd Stuttgart | 14 | (9) |
| 2025– | TSV Bernhausen | 9 | (4) |

International career
| 2014 | Serbia U17 | 1 | (0) |
- * Club domestic league appearances and goals as of 16 May 2025

Bogdan Rangelov (Serbian Cyrillic: Богдан Рангелов; born 28 August 1997) is a Serbian professional footballer who plays as an attacking midfielder for German club TSV Bernhausen.

== Club career ==
=== PAOK ===
On 1 July 2016, it was announced that Rangelov signed a long year season contract with Aiginiakos, on loan from PAOK.

=== SV Babelsberg 03 ===
On 29 January 2019, Rangelov joined German club SV Babelsberg 03 on a contract until the end of the season.

=== 1. FC Lokomotive Leipzig ===
In April 2021, Rangelov signed a two-year contract with 1. FC Lokomotive Leipzig. He made his debut on 24 July, the opening day of the 2021–22 Regionalliga, in a 4–1 loss to BFC Dynamo. On 28 August, he scored his first goal for the club, opening the score in a 3–1 away victory over VSG Altglienicke.
