= Dylan Talero =

Colombian footballer (born 2004)

Personal information
- Date of birth: 20 February 2004 (age 22)
- Place of birth: Colombia
- Height: 1.88 m (6 ft 2 in)
- Position: Forward

Youth career
- 2018–2019: PSG Academy – Florida
- 2019–2020: Inter Miami
- 2022–: Botafogo

Senior career*
Years	Team	Apps	(Gls)
2020	Fort Lauderdale CF	1	(0)
- * Club domestic league appearances and goals as of 9 August 2020

Dylan Talero (born 20 February 2004) is a Colombian footballer who plays as a forward. He is currently a player for Botafogo U20.

== Career ==
=== Fort Lauderdale CF ===
Talero made his league debut for the club on 8 August 2020, coming on as an 87th-minute substitute for Sami Guediri in a 2–1 away victory over Tormenta FC.
