= Didac Devesa =

Spanish footballer

Personal information
- Full name: Didac Ángel Devesa Albis
- Date of birth: 30 December 1990 (age 35)
- Place of birth: Esporles, Spain
- Height: 1.73 m (5 ft 8 in)
- Position: Midfielder

Team information
- Current team: Ayia Napa
- Number: 90

Youth career
- 2004–2008: San Francisco Mallorca
- 2008–2009: Mallorca

Senior career*
Years	Team	Apps	(Gls)
2009–2013	Mallorca B	76	(7)
2012–2013	→ Ponferradina (loan)	8	(0)
2013–2015	Lleida Esportiu	51	(4)
2015–2016	Aiginiakos	36	(12)
2016–2017	Platanias	33	(0)
2018	Apollon Smyrnis	10	(0)
2018–2019	Ermis	27	(1)
2019	Politehnica Iași	6	(0)
2020	Ermis	7	(2)
2020	Futuro Kings		
2021	Onisilos Sotira	16	(12)
2021–2022	Karmiotissa		
2022–2024	ASIL Lysi	49	(17)
2024	Achyronas-Onisilos	12	(7)
2025–	Ayia Napa	14	(0)
- * Club domestic league appearances and goals as of 26 June 2025

Didac Ángel Devesa Albis (born 30 December 1990) is a Spanish professional footballer who plays as a midfielder for Cypriot club Ayia Napa.

== Club career ==
Devesa was born in Esporles, Mallorca. He played youth football with local RCD Mallorca, going on to spend three full seasons as a senior with the reserves in the Segunda División B, the first being 2009–10.

In late April 2012, Devesa was loaned to SD Ponferradina for two seasons, with the deal being made effective in the summer. He made his Segunda División debut on 1 September, starting in a 1–0 away defeat against Girona FC.

On 1 July 2013, Devesa was released by Mallorca. Later in the month, he signed with Lleida Esportiu of the third level.

Devesa terminated his contract on 5 January 2015, joining Football League Greece side Aiginiakos F.C. two weeks later. In the following years he alternated between the country's second tier and the Super League, representing Platanias F.C. and Apollon Smyrnis FC.

On 12 July 2019, Devesa signed with FC Politehnica Iași of the Romanian Liga I. The following transfer window, he returned to the club he had come from, Ermis Aradippou FC.
