= Dimitrios Macheras =

Greek footballer

Personal information
- Full name: Dimitrios Macheras
- Date of birth: 16 August 1990 (age 36)
- Place of birth: Pyrgos, Greece
- Height: 1.78 m (5 ft 10 in)
- Position: Midfielder

Youth career
- –2009: Levadiakos

Senior career*
Years	Team	Apps	(Gls)
2009–2020	Levadiakos	121	(1)
2017–2018	→ Doxa Drama (loan)	6	(1)
2018	→ OFI (loan)	13	(2)
2018–2019	→ Karaiskakis (loan)	3	(0)
2020–2021	Egaleo	20	(1)
2021–2022	Nafpaktiakos Asteras		
2022–2023	Pandramaikos		
2023–2024	Vyron Kavala		
2024	Doxa Drama		
- * Club domestic league appearances and goals as of 6 June 2021

Dimitrios Macheras (Greek: Δημήτριος Μαχαίρας; born 16 August 1990) is a Greek professional footballer who plays as a midfielder.

== Club career ==
Macheras started his career at the youth team of Levadiakos and signed his first professional contract in June 2009. He was promoted to the first team on October of the same year and made his debut on 25 October during a victorious home game against Iraklis, coming as a substitute for Paulo Costa in the 46th minute.

Levadiakos was relegated in the Football League for the following 2010–11 season and the club's youngsters, including Machairas, were expected to play a major role in the club's fight for a Super League return. Sure enough, Machairas made 18 appearances for Levadiakos in the 2010–11 Football League, a season which saw Levadiakos being promoted to the Super League despite losing the promotion play-offs, thanks to the Koriopolis scandal.

== International career ==
Macheras was called up at the Greek national under-21 football team in May 2012 for a 2013 UEFA European Under-21 Football Championship qualification match against San Marino but stayed on the bench.
