= Srđan Savičević =

Serbian footballer

Personal information
- Date of birth: 14 June 1971 (age 55)
- Height: 1.85 m (6 ft 1 in)
- Position: Forward

Senior career*
Years	Team	Apps	(Gls)
1992–1993	Sloga Kraljevo		
1993–1994	Apollon Kalamarias	24	(4)
1999	TPV	8	(1)
2000	Uralan Elista	10	(0)
- * Club domestic league appearances and goals

Srđan Savičević (Serbian Cyrillic: Срђан Савићевић; born 14 June 1971) is a Serbian retired football player.

He had a season in the Apha Ethniki with Apollon Kalamarias.
