= Aldjon Pashaj =

Albanian-Greek footballer

Personal information
- Full name: Aldjon Pashaj
- Date of birth: 17 July 1994 (age 32)
- Place of birth: Fier, Albania
- Height: 1.92 m (6 ft 3 1/2 in)
- Position: Goalkeeper

Senior career*
Years	Team	Apps	(Gls)
2013–2014	Glyfada	7	(0)
2014–2017	Apollon Smyrnis	0	(0)
2017	Ionikos		
2018	Kallithea	3	(0)
- * Club domestic league appearances and goals as of 22 September 2019

Aldjon Pashaj (born 17 July 1994 in Fier, Albania) is an Albanian-Greek footballer who last played for Gamma Ethniki club Kallithea as a goalkeeper.

== Club career ==
In summer 2013, Pashaj signed his first professional contrast with Glyfada F.C. and one year later he signed for Apollon Smyrni. On 25 January 2017 Apollon Smyrnis F.C. announced the termination of his contract with team claiming a both ways will.
