= Danko Filipović =

Serbian footballer

Personal information
- Full name: Danko Filipović
- Date of birth: 3 October 1978 (age 48)
- Place of birth: Gornji Milanovac, SFR Yugoslavia
- Height: 1.86 m (6 ft 1 in)
- Position: Defender

Senior career*
Years	Team	Apps	(Gls)
–2008	Metalac Gornji Milanovac	136	(7)
2003	→ Takovo (loan)		
2008–2009	KMF Kolorado Gornji Milanovac		
2009–2011	Metalac Gornji Milanovac	2	(0)
2010–2011	→ Sloboda Čačak (loan)	25	(5)
2011	Budućnost Valjevo		
2012–2013	Metalac Gornji Milanovac	24	(1)
- * Club domestic league appearances and goals as of 24 October 2014

Danko Filipović (Serbian Cyrillic: Данко Филиповић; born 3 October 1978) is a Serbian retired football defender.
