= Christos Mavridis =

Greek footballer

Personal information
- Full name: Christos Mavridis
- Date of birth: 10 August 1998 (age 28)
- Place of birth: Greece
- Height: 1.80 m (5 ft 11 in)
- Position: Goalkeeper

Senior career*
Years	Team	Apps	(Gls)
2014–2015	Alimos	0	(0)
2015–	Apollon Smyrnis	0	(0)
- * Club domestic league appearances and goals

Christos Mavridis (Greek: Χρήστος Μαυρίδης; born 10 August 1998) is a professional Greek, footballer currently playing for Apollon Smyrnis, as a goalkeeper.
